= 2020 NPSL season =

108th season of FIFA-sanctioned soccer in the United States

National Premier Soccer League
- Season: 2020
- Dates: February 22 – March 26
- Matches: 16
- Goals: 56 (3.5 per match)
- Biggest home win: Las Vegas Legends FC 8–0 Temecula FC (March 1)
- Biggest away win: Club Xolos USA U-23 0–5 FC Golden State (February 29)
- Highest scoring: Las Vegas Legends FC 8–0 Temecula FC (March 1)

The 2020 National Premier Soccer League season was part of the 108th season of FIFA-sanctioned soccer in the United States and the 18th season of the National Premier Soccer League (NPSL). Miami FC, the defending league champions, left in the off-season and joined the National Independent Soccer Association and later the USL Championship.

On March 26, the season was cancelled due to the COVID-19 pandemic.

== Changes from 2019 ==
Multiple changes were made to the league's conferences ahead of the season. The Northeast Region was renamed to the "East Region." The Southeast Conference was moved from the South Region to the East Region and the Midwest Region's East Conference was renamed the “Rust Belt Conference.”

A new conference, the Gulf Coast Conference, was announced on November 12, 2019. It would include new teams, mostly from the Gulf Coast Premier League, Jacksonville Armada U-23 from the Sunshine Conference, and the returning New Orleans Jesters.

== Teams ==
=== Incoming teams ===
Team	Location	Notes
AFC Mobile	Mobile, Alabama	Joined from Gulf Coast Premier League
Austin United FC	Austin, Texas	Expansion
Carpathia FC	Sterling Heights, Michigan	Joined from United Premier Soccer League
Coyotes FC	Temple, Texas	Joined from United Premier Soccer League
FC Brownsville	Brownsville, Texas	Returned from one-year hiatus
First State FC	Wilmington, Delaware	Expansion
Fort Wayne FC	Fort Wayne, Indiana	Expansion
Las Vegas Legends FC	Las Vegas, Nevada	Expansion
LSA Athletico Lanier	Gainesville, Georgia	Joined from United Premier Soccer League
Maryland Bobcats FC	Derwood, Maryland	Joined from United Premier Soccer League
Metro Louisville FC	Louisville, Kentucky	Expansion
Milwaukee Torrent	Wauwatosa, Wisconsin	Returned from one-year hiatus
Muskegon Risers	Muskegon, Michigan	Joined from United Premier Soccer League
Nashville United	Nashville, Tennessee	Joined from Middle Tennessee Soccer Alliance
New Orleans Jesters	New Orleans, Louisiana	Returned from one-year hiatus
North Alabama SC	Huntsville, Alabama	Expansion
Project 51O	Oakland, California	Expansion
Pensacola FC	Pensacola, Florida	Joined from Gulf Coast Premier League
Port City FC	Gulfport, Mississippi	Joined from Gulf Coast Premier League
Tacoma Stars	Waller, Washington	Expansion
Tallahassee SC	Tallahassee, Florida	Joined from Gulf Coast Premier League
Valeo FC	Newton, Massachusetts	Expansion

=== Moved and/or rebranded teams ===
Team	Previous Name	Location	Previous Location	Notes
Club Xolos USA U-23	Deportivo Coras USA	Riverside, California		Rebrand
International Portland Select FC	FC Mulhouse Portland	Portland, Oregon		Rebrand
Maryland Bobcats FC	World Class Premier Elite FC	Derwood, Maryland		Rebrand
Miami Dutch Lions FC	Dutch Lions FC	Miami, Florida	Conroe, Texas	Relocation and rebrand
OSA Seattle FC	OSA FC	Seattle, Washington		Rebrand

=== Outgoing teams ===
Team	Location	Notes
AFC Ann Arbor	Ann Arbor, Michigan	Joined USL League Two
Asheville City SC	Asheville, North Carolina	Joined USL League Two
Atlanta SC	Atlanta, Georgia	Joined National Independent Soccer Association
Brooklyn Italians	Brooklyn, New York	Not listed on NPSL website
Chattanooga FC	Chattanooga, Tennessee	Joined National Independent Soccer Association
City of Angels FC	Los Angeles, California	Not listed on NPSL website
Detroit City FC	Hamtramck, Michigan	Joined National Independent Soccer Association
East Bay FC Stompers	Hayward, California	Hiatus
FC Wichita	Wichita, Kansas	Joined USL League Two
Grand Rapids FC	Grand Rapids, Michigan	Joined USL League Two
Greenville FC	Greenville, South Carolina	Hiatus
Katy 1895 FC	Katy, Texas	Not listed on NPSL website
Miami FC	Miami, Florida	Joined National Independent Soccer Association
Michigan Stars FC	Pontiac, Michigan	Joined National Independent Soccer Association
Minnesota TwinStars FC	Minnetonka, Minnesota	Not listed on NPSL website
New Jersey Copa FC	Metuchen, New Jersey	Joined USL League Two
New York Cosmos B	New York City, New York	Not listed on NPSL website
Orange County FC	Irvine, California	Not listed on NPSL website
San Ramon FC	San Ramon, California	Hiatus
Sioux Falls Thunder FC	Sioux Falls, South Dakota	Not listed on NPSL website
Tyler FC	Tyler, Texas	Not listed on NPSL website

=== 2020 teams ===
Midwest Region
Division	Team
Great Lakes Conference	Carpathia FC
Great Lakes Conference	FC Columbus
Great Lakes Conference	FC Indiana
Great Lakes Conference	Fort Wayne FC
Great Lakes Conference	Kalamazoo FC
Great Lakes Conference	Muskegon Risers
Great Lakes Conference	Toledo Villa FC
North Conference	Dakota Fusion FC
North Conference	Duluth FC
North Conference	LaCrosse Aris FC
North Conference	Med City FC
North Conference	Milwaukee Torrent
North Conference	Minneapolis City SC
Rust Belt Conference	Cleveland SC
Rust Belt Conference	Erie Commodores FC
Rust Belt Conference	FC Buffalo
Rust Belt Conference	Pittsburgh Hotspurs
Rust Belt Conference	Rochester Lancers
Rust Belt Conference	Syracuse FC

East Region
Division	Team
Keystone Conference	Atlantic City FC
Keystone Conference	Electric City Shock SC
Keystone Conference	FC Monmouth
Keystone Conference	FC Motown
Keystone Conference	Hershey FC
Keystone Conference	Philadelphia Lone Star FC
Keystone Conference	Torch FC
Keystone Conference	West Chester United SC
Mid-Atlantic Conference	Charlottesville Alliance FC
Mid-Atlantic Conference	FC Baltimore Christos
Mid-Atlantic Conference	FC Frederick
Mid-Atlantic Conference	First State FC
Mid-Atlantic Conference	Maryland Bobcats FC
Mid-Atlantic Conference	Northern Virginia United FC
Mid-Atlantic Conference	Virginia Beach City FC
North Atlantic Conference	Boston City FC
North Atlantic Conference	Greater Lowell Rough Diamonds
North Atlantic Conference	Hartford City FC
North Atlantic Conference	Kingston Stockade FC
North Atlantic Conference	New York Athletic Club S.C.
North Atlantic Conference	Rhode Island Reds FC
North Atlantic Conference	Valeo FC
Southeast Conference	Georgia Revolution FC
Southeast Conference	Inter Nashville FC
Southeast Conference	LSA Athletico Lanier
Southeast Conference	Metro Louisville FC
Southeast Conference	Nashville United
Southeast Conference	North Alabama SC

South Region
Division	Team
Gulf Coast Conference	AFC Mobile
Gulf Coast Conference	Jacksonville Armada U-23
Gulf Coast Conference	New Orleans Jesters
Gulf Coast Conference	Pensacola FC
Gulf Coast Conference	Port City FC
Gulf Coast Conference	Tallahassee SC
Heartland Conference	Club Atletico Saint Louis
Heartland Conference	Dallas City FC
Heartland Conference	Demize NPSL
Heartland Conference	Little Rock Rangers
Heartland Conference	Ozark FC
Heartland Conference	Tulsa Athletic
Lone Star Conference	Austin United FC
Lone Star Conference	Coyotes FC
Lone Star Conference	Denton Diablos FC
Lone Star Conference	FC Brownsville
Lone Star Conference	Fort Worth Vaqueros FC
Lone Star Conference	Laredo Heat SC
Lone Star Conference	Midland-Odessa Sockers FC
Sunshine Conference	Boca Raton FC
Sunshine Conference	Central Florida Panthers SC
Sunshine Conference	Miami Dutch Lions FC
Sunshine Conference	Miami United FC
Sunshine Conference	Naples United FC
Sunshine Conference	Storm FC

West Region
Division	Team
Golden Gate Conference	Academica SC
Golden Gate Conference	El Farolito
Golden Gate Conference	FC Davis
Golden Gate Conference	Napa Valley 1839 FC
Golden Gate Conference	Project 51O
Golden Gate Conference	Sacramento Gold FC
Golden Gate Conference	Sonoma County Sol
Northwest Conference	Crossfire Redmond
Northwest Conference	International Portland Select FC
Northwest Conference	OSA Seattle FC
Northwest Conference	PDX FC
Northwest Conference	Spokane Shadow SC
Northwest Conference	Tacoma Stars
Southwest Conference	A.S. Los Angeles
Southwest Conference	ASC San Diego
Southwest Conference	Club Xolos USA U-23
Southwest Conference	FC Arizona
Southwest Conference	FC Golden State
Southwest Conference	High Desert Elite FC
Southwest Conference	Las Vegas Legends FC
Southwest Conference	Oxnard Guerreros FC
Southwest Conference	Temecula FC

== Standings and results ==
Only two of the three West Region conferences had begun play prior to the season being cancelled.

=== West Region ===
==== Southwest Conference ====
Pos	Team	Pld	W	L	T	GF	GA	GD	Pts
1	FC Arizona	3	2	0	1	6	3	+3	7
2	Las Vegas Legends	2	2	0	0	11	0	+11	6 (Note: Las Vegas Legends and FC Golden State were tied on points and had not played one another. Las Vegas Legends won the tiebreaker on total goal differential (+11 to +7).)
3	FC Golden State	2	2	0	0	7	0	+7	6
4	Oxnard Guerreros FC	1	1	0	0	6	1	+5	3 (Note: Oxnard Guerreros FC, A.S. Los Angeles, and ASC San Diego were all tied on points. Oxnard Guerreros FC won the first tiebreaker based on total goal differential (+5 to +1 to +4). ASC San Diego won the second tiebreaker based on head-to-head results versus A.S. Los Angeles.)
5	ASC San Diego	3	1	2	0	3	7	−4	3
6	A.S. Los Angeles	2	1	1	0	4	3	+1	3
7	Temecula FC	3	0	2	1	2	12	−10	1
8	High Desert Elite FC	2	0	2	0	1	4	−3	0 (Note: High Desert Elite FC and Club Xolos USA U-23 were tied on points and had not played one another. High Desert Elite FC won the tiebreaker based on total goal differential (-3 to -10).)
9	Club Xolos USA U-23	2	0	2	0	1	11	−10	0

Updated to match(es) played on March 7, 2020. Source: NPSL standings
Rules for classification: 1) points; 2) head-to-head; 3) goal differential in head-to-head results; 4) wins; 5) total goal differential; 6) fewest losses; 7) coin toss. If three or more teams are tied on points, a mini-table involving only the tied teams is used, and teams are ranked in the mini-table on points. If two teams are tied on points in the mini-table, the two-team rules for classification apply. If three or more teams are tied on points in the mini-table, they are ranked based on 1) wins in conference competition; 2) total goal differential in conference competition; 3) fewest losses in conference competition; 4) coin toss.

==== Golden Gate Conference ====
Pos	Team	Pld	W	L	T	GF	GA	GD	Pts
1	Academica SC	2	2	0	0	5	0	+5	6
2	Project 51O	1	1	0	0	2	1	+1	3 (Note: Project 51O and Napa Valley 1839 FC were tied on points. Project 51O won the tiebreaker based on head-to-head results.)
3	Napa Valley 1839 FC	2	1	1	0	2	2	0	3
4	Sacramento Gold	2	0	0	2	3	3	0	2
5	FC Davis	2	0	1	1	1	3	−2	1 (Note: FC Davis and Sonoma County Sol FC were tied on points and never played head to head. FC Davis wins the tiebreaker based on total goal differential (-2 to -3).)
6	Sonoma County Sol	2	0	1	1	2	5	−3	1
7	El Farolito	1	0	1	0	0	1	−1	0

Updated to match(es) played on March 8, 2020. Source: NPSL standings
Rules for classification: 1) points; 2) head-to-head; 3) goal differential in head-to-head results; 4) wins; 5) total goal differential; 6) fewest losses; 7) coin toss. If three or more teams are tied on points, a mini-table involving only the tied teams is used, and teams are ranked in the mini-table on points. If two teams are tied on points in the mini-table, the two-team rules for classification apply. If three or more teams are tied on points in the mini-table, they are ranked based on 1) wins in conference competition; 2) total goal differential in conference competition; 3) fewest losses in conference competition; 4) coin toss.

== Members Cup ==
The league intends to hold the second edition of its Members Cup tournament in autumn 2020, beginning in mid-August and concluding with the 2020 NPSL Members Cup Final in November. On July 16, the league announced a four team tournament hosted by Erie Commodores FC, and including 2019 National Semifinalist Cleveland SC, along with FC Buffalo and Pittsburgh Hotspurs. Pittsburgh won the "Rust Belt Group" on July 29 with a win over the Commodores.

In addition, the July 29 match between Buffalo and Cleveland also served as a group stage game for the 2020 NISA Independent Cup, which both teams were also taking part in alongside former NPSL member Detroit City FC in that tournament's "Great Lakes Region".

=== Teams ===
Team	City	Stadium	Founded	Head coach
Rust Belt Group
Cleveland SC	Cleveland, Ohio	Krenzler Field	2018	(United States) Lewis Dunne
Erie Commodores FC	Erie, Pennsylvania	McConnell Family Stadium	2009	(Scotland) Dale White
FC Buffalo	Buffalo, New York	All-High Stadium	2009	(United States) Frank Butcher
Pittsburgh Hotspurs	Pittsburgh, Pennsylvania	The Ellis School	2019	(England) Tom Campbell

Location of the teams

=== Standings ===
Pos	Team	Pld	W	D	L	GF	GA	GD	Pts
1	Pittsburgh Hotspurs (C)	2	1	1	0	5	2	+3	4
2	Cleveland SC	2	1	1	0	5	3	+2	4
3	FC Buffalo	2	1	0	1	4	5	−1	3
4	Erie Commodores FC	2	0	0	2	2	6	−4	0

Source: NPSL.com
Rules for classification: 1) points; 2) head to head (if applicable); 3) goal differential in head-to-head results (if applicable); 4) wins; 5) total goal differential; 6) fewest losses; 7) coin toss.
(C) Champions

==== Fixtures and results ====
Home \ Away	CSC	ERI	FCB	PIT
Cleveland SC	—			2–2
Erie Commodores FC		—	2–3	0–3
FC Buffalo	1–3		—	
Pittsburgh Hotspurs				—

Source: NPSL.com
Legend: Blue = home team win; Yellow = draw; Red = away team win.

== See also ==
- 2020 U.S. Open Cup
- 2020 Hank Steinbrecher Cup
