= 2022 National Premier Soccer League season =

National Premier Soccer League
- Season: 2022
- Dates: March 19 – July 16 (regular season); June 25 – August 6 (playoffs)
- Champions: FC Motown (1st Title)
- Regular season title: JAX Armada U-23 (1st Title)
- Matches: 505
- Goals: 1,911 (3.78 per match)
- Best player: (United States) Christian Soto Rincon (Crossfire Redmond)
- Top goalscorer: 15 Goals (United States) Damani Camara (FC Columbus)
- Best goalkeeper: (United States) Connor Durant (Laredo Heat)
- Biggest home win: Shock 8–0 Hershey (June 30); FCB 8–0 San Antonio (July 2)
- Biggest away win: Sonoma 0–9 El Farolito (June 18); Magia 0–9 Miami United (July 9)
- Highest scoring: (10 goals); San Antonio 8–2 Austin (June 11); Jackson 8–2 Lone Star (June 29)
- Longest winning run: 10 matches JAX Armada U-23 (May 6 – July 9)
- Longest unbeaten run: 10 matches JAX Armada U-23 (May 6 – July 9); Med City (May 7 – June 22); Hartford City (May 7 – July 9); Muskegon (May 20 – July 14)
- Longest winless run: 12 matches Tallahassee (April 30 – July 9)
- Longest losing run: 9 matches Tallahassee (May 21 – July 9)
- All statistics correct as of August 7, 2022.

The 2022 National Premier Soccer League season was the 20th season of the National Premier Soccer League and part of the 110th season of FIFA-sanctioned soccer in the United States.

The regular season began on March 19 and ended on July 16. In total, 92 teams participated in this season.

== Format changes ==
The Northwest and Southwest Conferences merged to form the Pacific Conference while the Golden Gate Conference returned to traditional league play. The Lone Star Conference returned to the South Region after temporarily joining the West in 2021.

== Teams ==
Note: Teams that are italicized previously played in the NPSL and are returning from hiatus.

=== Incoming teams ===
- Akron City FC (Akron, OH)
- Apotheos FC (Kennesaw, GA)
- Austin United FC (Austin, TX)
- Cedar Stars FC (Chester, NY)
- Club Atletico Saint Louis (Saint Louis, MO)
- Corinthians FC of San Antonio (San Antonio, TX)
- Grove Soccer United (Richmond, VA)
- Jackson Lions FC (Jackson, NJ)
- Lubbock Matadors SC (Lubbock, TX)
- Magia FC (Miami Gardens, FL)
- Miami Beach CF (Miami Beach, FL)
- Minnesota TwinStars FC (Brooklyn Park, MN)
- Muskegon Risers SC (Muskegon, MI)
- Oakland SC (Oakland, CA)
- Pennsylvania Classics AC (Lancaster, PA)
- Philadelphia Ukrainians Nationals SC (Horsham, PA)
- SC Brave Lions (Glendale, CA)
- Sunflower State FC (Overland Park, KS)

=== Name changes ===
- Greater Lowell Rough Diamonds to Alexandria Reds
- Katy 1895 FC to CF10 Houston FC

=== Departing teams ===
- ASC San Diego (San Diego, CA)
  (merged with San Diego 1904 FC and joined the National Independent Soccer Association)
- Boston City FC (Revere, MA)
  (joined USL League Two)
- FC Baltimore Christos (Baltimore, MD)
- Metro Louisville FC (Louisville, KY)
  (joined United Premier Soccer League)
- PDX FC (Portland, OR)
  (joined USL League Two in 2021)
- Rochester Lancers (Rochester, NY)
  (joined United Premier Soccer League)

=== Teams on hiatus or folded ===
- Boca Raton FC (Delray Beach, FL)
- Dallas City FC (McKinney, TX)
- FC Golden State (Pomona, CA)
- FC Indiana (Lafayette, IN)
- Midland-Odessa Sockers FC (Midland, TX)
- Port City FC (Gulfport, MS)
- Spokane Shadow SC (Spokane, WA)
- Storm FC (Pembroke Pines, FL)
- Tacoma Stars (Waller, WA)
- Temecula FC (Temecula, CA)

=== 2022 Teams ===
West Region
Division	Team
Golden Gate Conference	Academica SC
Golden Gate Conference	Contra Costa FC
Golden Gate Conference	El Farolito
Golden Gate Conference	FC Davis
Golden Gate Conference	Napa Valley 1839 FC
Golden Gate Conference	Oakland SC
Golden Gate Conference	Oakland Stompers
Golden Gate Conference	Sacramento Gold FC
Golden Gate Conference	Sonoma County Sol
Pacific Conference	Crossfire Redmond
Pacific Conference	FC Arizona
Pacific Conference	International Portland Select FC
Pacific Conference	Las Vegas Legends FC
Pacific Conference	OSA Seattle FC
Pacific Conference	SC Brave Lions

South Region
Division	Team
Gulf Coast Conference	AFC Mobile
Gulf Coast Conference	Florida Roots Futbol Club
Gulf Coast Conference	Jacksonville Armada U-23
Gulf Coast Conference	New Orleans Jesters
Gulf Coast Conference	Pensacola FC
Gulf Coast Conference	Southern States SC
Gulf Coast Conference	Tallahassee SC
Heartland Conference	Arkansas Wolves FC
Heartland Conference	Club Atletico Saint Louis
Heartland Conference	Demize NPSL
Heartland Conference	OKC 1889 FC
Heartland Conference	Sunflower State FC
Heartland Conference	Reign FK
Heartland Conference	Tulsa Athletic
Lone Star Conference	Austin United FC
Lone Star Conference	CF10 Houston FC
Lone Star Conference	Corinthians FC of San Antonio
Lone Star Conference	Coyotes FC
Lone Star Conference	Denton Diablos FC
Lone Star Conference	FC Brownsville
Lone Star Conference	Fort Worth Vaqueros FC
Lone Star Conference	Irving FC
Lone Star Conference	Laredo Heat SC
Lone Star Conference	Lubbock Matadors SC
Sunshine Conference	Central Florida Panthers SC
Sunshine Conference	Magia FC
Sunshine Conference	Miami Beach CF
Sunshine Conference	Miami Dutch Lions FC
Sunshine Conference	Miami United FC
Sunshine Conference	Naples United FC

Midwest Region
Division	Team
Great Lakes Conference	Carpathia FC
Great Lakes Conference	FC Columbus
Great Lakes Conference	Milwaukee Torrent
Great Lakes Conference	Muskegon Risers SC
Great Lakes Conference	Panathinaikos Chicago
North Conference	Dakota Fusion FC
North Conference	Duluth FC
North Conference	Joy St. Louis Park
North Conference	LaCrosse Aris FC
North Conference	Med City FC
North Conference	Minneapolis City SC
North Conference	Minnesota Twin Stars
North Conference	Sioux Falls Thunder FC
Rust Belt Conference	Akron City FC
Rust Belt Conference	Cleveland SC
Rust Belt Conference	Erie Commodores FC
Rust Belt Conference	FC Buffalo
Rust Belt Conference	Pittsburgh Hotspurs

East Region
Division	Team
Keystone Conference	Atlantic City FC
Keystone Conference	Electric City Shock SC
Keystone Conference	FC Monmouth
Keystone Conference	FC Motown
Keystone Conference	Hershey FC
Keystone Conference	Jackson Lions FC
Keystone Conference	Pennsylvania Classics AC
Keystone Conference	Philadelphia Lone Star FC
Keystone Conference	Philadelphia Ukrainians Nationals
Keystone Conference	Torch FC
Keystone Conference	West Chester United SC
Mid-Atlantic Conference	Alexandria Reds
Mid-Atlantic Conference	FC Frederick
Mid-Atlantic Conference	First State FC
Mid-Atlantic Conference	Grove Soccer United
Mid-Atlantic Conference	Northern Virginia United FC
Mid-Atlantic Conference	Virginia Beach City FC
North Atlantic Conference	Cedar Stars FC
North Atlantic Conference	Hartford City FC
North Atlantic Conference	Kingston Stockade FC
North Atlantic Conference	New York Shockers
North Atlantic Conference	Syracuse FC
North Atlantic Conference	Valeo FC
Southeast Conference	Apotheos FC
Southeast Conference	Appalachian FC
Southeast Conference	Georgia Revolution FC
Southeast Conference	Georgia Storm
Southeast Conference	LSA Athletico Lanier
Southeast Conference	North Alabama SC

== Standings and results ==
=== West Region ===
==== Golden Gate Conference ====
Pos	Team	Pld	W	L	T	GF	GA	GD	Pts	Qualification
1	Sacramento Gold	10	8	1	1	29	12	+17	25	Golden Gate Conference playoffs
2	El Farolito	10	8	2	0	38	11	+27	24	Golden Gate Conference playoffs
3	Napa Valley 1839 FC	10	8	2	0	32	11	+21	24	Golden Gate Conference playoffs
4	Contra Costa FC	10	4	5	1	28	25	+3	13	Golden Gate Conference playoffs
5	Academica SC	10	4	5	1	19	18	+1	13	Golden Gate Conference playoffs
6	FC Davis	10	4	5	1	16	27	−11	13	Golden Gate Conference playoffs
7	Oakland SC	10	3	5	2	19	28	−9	11	Golden Gate Conference playoffs
8	Sonoma County Sol	10	2	8	0	14	37	−23	6	Golden Gate Conference playoffs
9	Oakland Stompers	10	0	8	2	10	36	−26	2	

Source: NPSL
Rules for classification: 1) points; 2) head-to-head; 3) goal differential in head-to-head results; 4) wins; 5) total goal differential; 6) fewest losses; 7) coin toss. If three or more teams are tied on points, a mini-table involving only the tied teams is used, and teams are ranked in the mini-table on points. If two teams are tied on points in the mini-table, the two-team rules for classification apply. If three or more teams are tied on points in the mini-table, they are ranked based on 1) wins in conference competition; 2) total goal differential in conference competition; 3) fewest losses in conference competition; 4) coin toss.

==== Pacific Conference ====
Due to the distance between teams, the Pacific Conference was split into two divisions. The North Division featured Crossfire Redmond, International Portland Select FC and OSA Seattle FC while the South Division included FC Arizona, Las Vegas Legends FC, and SC Brave Lions. Clubs played the other teams within their division three times each and two of the teams in the other division twice each. The top two teams from each group qualified for the playoffs and play one-another in the conference semifinals.

===== North Division =====
Pos	Team	Pld	W	L	T	GF	GA	GD	Pts	Qualification
1	International Portland Select FC	10	6	1	3	24	6	+18	21	North Division playoffs
2	Crossfire Redmond	10	4	1	5	16	10	+6	17	North Division playoffs
3	OSA Seattle FC	10	1	8	1	7	29	−22	4	

Source: NPSL
Rules for classification: 1) points; 2) head-to-head; 3) goal differential in head-to-head results; 4) wins; 5) total goal differential; 6) fewest losses; 7) coin toss. If three or more teams are tied on points, a mini-table involving only the tied teams is used, and teams are ranked in the mini-table on points. If two teams are tied on points in the mini-table, the two-team rules for classification apply. If three or more teams are tied on points in the mini-table, they are ranked based on 1) wins in conference competition; 2) total goal differential in conference competition; 3) fewest losses in conference competition; 4) coin toss.

===== South Division =====
Pos	Team	Pld	W	L	T	GF	GA	GD	Pts	Qualification
1	SC Brave Lions	10	7	3	0	24	14	+10	21	South Division playoffs
2	FC Arizona	10	2	4	4	13	21	−8	10	South Division playoffs
3	Las Vegas Legends FC	10	2	5	3	20	24	−4	9	

Source: NPSL
Rules for classification: 1) points; 2) head-to-head; 3) goal differential in head-to-head results; 4) wins; 5) total goal differential; 6) fewest losses; 7) coin toss. If three or more teams are tied on points, a mini-table involving only the tied teams is used, and teams are ranked in the mini-table on points. If two teams are tied on points in the mini-table, the two-team rules for classification apply. If three or more teams are tied on points in the mini-table, they are ranked based on 1) wins in conference competition; 2) total goal differential in conference competition; 3) fewest losses in conference competition; 4) coin toss.

=== Midwest Region ===
==== Great Lakes Conference ====
Pos	Team	Pld	W	L	T	GF	GA	GD	Pts	Qualification
1	Muskegon Risers (C)	10	8	0	2	33	10	+23	26	Midwest Region Semifinals
2	FC Columbus	10	6	2	2	31	18	+13	20	Midwest Region Quarterfinals
3	Carpathia FC	10	3	4	3	15	20	−5	12	
4	Milwaukee Torrent	10	2	6	2	20	22	−2	8	
5	Panathinaikos Chicago	10	1	8	1	8	37	−29	4	

Source: NPSL
Rules for classification: 1) points; 2) head-to-head; 3) goal differential in head-to-head results; 4) wins; 5) total goal differential; 6) fewest losses; 7) coin toss. If three or more teams are tied on points, a mini-table involving only the tied teams is used, and teams are ranked in the mini-table on points. If two teams are tied on points in the mini-table, the two-team rules for classification apply. If three or more teams are tied on points in the mini-table, they are ranked based on 1) wins in conference competition; 2) total goal differential in conference competition; 3) fewest losses in conference competition; 4) coin toss.
(C) Champions

==== North Conference ====
Pos	Team	Pld	W	L	T	GF	GA	GD	Pts	Qualification
1	Med City FC (C)	14	11	1	2	35	11	+24	35	Midwest Region Semifinals
2	Duluth FC	14	11	2	1	43	12	+31	34	Midwest Region Quarterfinals
3	Dakota Fusion FC	14	7	4	3	36	28	+8	24	
4	Minneapolis City SC	14	7	6	1	29	27	+2	22	
5	Sioux Falls Thunder FC	14	3	6	5	27	28	−1	14	
6	Minnesota TwinStars FC	14	4	9	1	22	42	−20	13	
7	Joy St. Louis Park	14	3	10	1	15	36	−21	10	
8	La Crosse Aris FC	14	3	11	0	21	44	−23	9	

Source: NPSL
Rules for classification: 1) points; 2) head-to-head; 3) goal differential in head-to-head results; 4) wins; 5) total goal differential; 6) fewest losses; 7) coin toss. If three or more teams are tied on points, a mini-table involving only the tied teams is used, and teams are ranked in the mini-table on points. If two teams are tied on points in the mini-table, the two-team rules for classification apply. If three or more teams are tied on points in the mini-table, they are ranked based on 1) wins in conference competition; 2) total goal differential in conference competition; 3) fewest losses in conference competition; 4) coin toss.
(C) Champions

==== Rust Belt Conference ====
Pos	Team	Pld	W	L	T	GF	GA	GD	Pts	Qualification
1	Cleveland SC (C)	12	8	3	1	33	14	+19	25	Midwest Region Quarterfinals
2	Pittsburgh Hotspurs	12	8	4	0	24	15	+9	24	Midwest Region Quarterfinals
3	FC Buffalo	12	5	6	1	15	20	−5	16	
4	Erie Commodores	12	3	7	2	13	23	−10	11	
5	Akron City FC	12	2	6	4	10	23	−13	10	

Source: NPSL
Rules for classification: 1) points; 2) head-to-head; 3) goal differential in head-to-head results; 4) wins; 5) total goal differential; 6) fewest losses; 7) coin toss. If three or more teams are tied on points, a mini-table involving only the tied teams is used, and teams are ranked in the mini-table on points. If two teams are tied on points in the mini-table, the two-team rules for classification apply. If three or more teams are tied on points in the mini-table, they are ranked based on 1) wins in conference competition; 2) total goal differential in conference competition; 3) fewest losses in conference competition; 4) coin toss.
(C) Champions

=== South Region ===
==== Gulf Coast Conference ====
Pos	Team	Pld	W	L	T	GF	GA	GD	Pts	Qualification
1	Jacksonville Armada FC U-23	12	11	0	1	36	11	+25	34	Gulf Coast Conference playoffs
2	Southern States SC	12	9	3	0	35	14	+21	27	Gulf Coast Conference playoffs
3	New Orleans Jesters	12	6	5	1	28	24	+4	19	Gulf Coast Conference playoffs
4	Pensacola FC	12	6	5	1	21	23	−2	19	Gulf Coast Conference playoffs
5	AFC Mobile	12	4	7	1	19	20	−1	13	
6	Florida Roots FC	12	3	9	0	18	39	−21	9	
7	Tallahassee SC	12	0	10	2	12	38	−26	2	

Source: NPSL
Rules for classification: 1) points; 2) head-to-head; 3) goal differential in head-to-head results; 4) wins; 5) total goal differential; 6) fewest losses; 7) coin toss. If three or more teams are tied on points, a mini-table involving only the tied teams is used, and teams are ranked in the mini-table on points. If two teams are tied on points in the mini-table, the two-team rules for classification apply. If three or more teams are tied on points in the mini-table, they are ranked based on 1) wins in conference competition; 2) total goal differential in conference competition; 3) fewest losses in conference competition; 4) coin toss.

==== Heartland Conference ====
Pos	Team	Pld	W	L	T	GF	GA	GD	Pts	Qualification
1	Tulsa Athletic	12	9	1	2	36	10	+26	29	Heartland Conference playoffs
2	OKC 1889 FC	12	8	2	2	20	14	+6	26	Heartland Conference playoffs
3	Sunflower State FC	12	5	4	3	19	20	−1	18	Heartland Conference playoffs
4	Demize NPSL	12	4	4	4	18	20	−2	16	Heartland Conference playoffs
5	Arkansas Wolves FC	12	4	7	1	18	21	−3	13	
6	Club Atletico Saint Louis	12	4	8	0	18	29	−11	12	
7	Reign FK	12	1	9	2	12	27	−15	5	

Source: NPSL
Rules for classification: 1) points; 2) head-to-head; 3) goal differential in head-to-head results; 4) wins; 5) total goal differential; 6) fewest losses; 7) coin toss. If three or more teams are tied on points, a mini-table involving only the tied teams is used, and teams are ranked in the mini-table on points. If two teams are tied on points in the mini-table, the two-team rules for classification apply. If three or more teams are tied on points in the mini-table, they are ranked based on 1) wins in conference competition; 2) total goal differential in conference competition; 3) fewest losses in conference competition; 4) coin toss.

==== Lone Star Conference ====
Pos	Team	Pld	W	L	T	GF	GA	GD	Pts	Qualification
1	Laredo Heat SC	12	8	1	3	30	8	+22	27	Lone Star Conference playoffs
2	FC Brownsville	12	8	3	1	38	15	+23	25	Lone Star Conference playoffs
3	Corinthians FC of San Antonio	12	7	2	3	29	20	+9	24	Lone Star Conference playoffs
4	Irving FC	12	6	1	5	31	11	+20	23	Lone Star Conference playoffs
5	Denton Diablos FC	12	7	4	1	31	15	+16	22	
6	Lubbock Matadors SC	12	6	4	2	25	15	+10	20	
7	CF10 Houston FC	12	3	7	2	15	38	−23	11	
8	Fort Worth Vaqueros FC	12	3	8	1	17	25	−8	10	
9	Austin United FC	12	1	10	1	16	44	−28	4	
10	Coyotes FC	12	1	10	1	9	50	−41	4	

Source: NPSL
Rules for classification: 1) points; 2) head-to-head; 3) goal differential in head-to-head results; 4) wins; 5) total goal differential; 6) fewest losses; 7) coin toss. If three or more teams are tied on points, a mini-table involving only the tied teams is used, and teams are ranked in the mini-table on points. If two teams are tied on points in the mini-table, the two-team rules for classification apply. If three or more teams are tied on points in the mini-table, they are ranked based on 1) wins in conference competition; 2) total goal differential in conference competition; 3) fewest losses in conference competition; 4) coin toss.

==== Sunshine Conference ====
Pos	Team	Pld	W	L	T	GF	GA	GD	Pts	Qualification
1	Miami Beach Club de Futbol	10	8	2	0	25	8	+17	24	Sunshine Conference playoffs
2	Miami United FC	10	7	3	0	26	10	+16	21	Sunshine Conference playoffs
3	Central Florida Panthers SC	10	7	3	0	25	12	+13	21	Sunshine Conference playoffs
4	Naples United FC	10	4	4	2	22	11	+11	14	Sunshine Conference playoffs
5	Miami Dutch Lions FC	10	1	7	2	8	23	−15	5	
6	Magia FC	10	1	9	0	7	49	−42	3	

Source: NPSL
Rules for classification: 1) points; 2) head-to-head; 3) goal differential in head-to-head results; 4) wins; 5) total goal differential; 6) fewest losses; 7) coin toss. If three or more teams are tied on points, a mini-table involving only the tied teams is used, and teams are ranked in the mini-table on points. If two teams are tied on points in the mini-table, the two-team rules for classification apply. If three or more teams are tied on points in the mini-table, they are ranked based on 1) wins in conference competition; 2) total goal differential in conference competition; 3) fewest losses in conference competition; 4) coin toss.

=== East Region ===
==== Keystone Conference ====
Pos	Team	Pld	W	L	T	GF	GA	GD	Pts	Qualification
1	FC Motown	10	7	1	2	32	13	+19	23	Keystone Conference playoffs
2	Electric City Shock SC	10	7	1	2	29	10	+19	23	Keystone Conference playoffs
3	West Chester United SC	10	6	1	3	26	13	+13	21	Keystone Conference playoffs
4	Philadelphia Ukrainians Nationals SC	10	6	1	3	22	14	+8	21	Keystone Conference playoffs
5	Jackson Lions FC	10	5	4	1	32	23	+9	16	
6	Philadelphia Lone Star FC	10	3	6	1	23	29	−6	10	
7	Torch FC	10	3	6	1	14	24	−10	10	
8	FC Monmouth	10	1	4	5	10	19	−9	8	
9	Atlantic City FC	10	2	6	2	11	24	−13	8	
10	Pennsylvania Classics AC	10	2	7	1	15	27	−12	7	
11	Hershey FC	10	1	6	3	9	27	−18	6	

Source: NPSL
Rules for classification: 1) points; 2) head-to-head; 3) goal differential in head-to-head results; 4) wins; 5) total goal differential; 6) fewest losses; 7) coin toss. If three or more teams are tied on points, a mini-table involving only the tied teams is used, and teams are ranked in the mini-table on points. If two teams are tied on points in the mini-table, the two-team rules for classification apply. If three or more teams are tied on points in the mini-table, they are ranked based on 1) wins in conference competition; 2) total goal differential in conference competition; 3) fewest losses in conference competition; 4) coin toss.

==== Mid-Atlantic Conference ====
Pos	Team	Pld	W	L	T	GF	GA	GD	Pts	Qualification
1	Alexandria Reds	10	7	2	1	20	10	+10	22	Mid-Atlantic Conference playoffs
2	Northern Virginia United FC	10	6	2	2	20	13	+7	20	Mid-Atlantic Conference playoffs
3	Virginia Beach City FC	10	5	1	4	18	11	+7	19	Mid-Atlantic Conference playoffs
4	FC Frederick	10	4	5	1	18	18	0	13	Mid-Atlantic Conference playoffs
5	Grove Soccer United	10	2	8	0	5	20	−15	6	
6	First State FC	10	1	7	2	16	25	−9	5	

Source: NPSL
Rules for classification: 1) points; 2) head-to-head; 3) goal differential in head-to-head results; 4) wins; 5) total goal differential; 6) fewest losses; 7) coin toss. If three or more teams are tied on points, a mini-table involving only the tied teams is used, and teams are ranked in the mini-table on points. If two teams are tied on points in the mini-table, the two-team rules for classification apply. If three or more teams are tied on points in the mini-table, they are ranked based on 1) wins in conference competition; 2) total goal differential in conference competition; 3) fewest losses in conference competition; 4) coin toss.

==== North Atlantic Conference ====
Pos	Team	Pld	W	L	T	GF	GA	GD	Pts	Qualification
1	Hartford City FC	10	8	0	2	21	8	+13	26	North Atlantic Conference playoffs
2	Valeo FC	10	5	2	3	19	13	+6	18	North Atlantic Conference playoffs
3	Cedar Stars FC	10	2	3	5	12	18	−6	11	North Atlantic Conference playoffs
4	New York Shockers	10	2	4	4	16	16	0	10	North Atlantic Conference playoffs
5	Kingston Stockade FC	10	2	5	3	11	15	−4	9	
6	Syracuse FC	10	0	5	5	8	17	−9	5	

Source: NPSL
Rules for classification: 1) points; 2) head-to-head; 3) goal differential in head-to-head results; 4) wins; 5) total goal differential; 6) fewest losses; 7) coin toss. If three or more teams are tied on points, a mini-table involving only the tied teams is used, and teams are ranked in the mini-table on points. If two teams are tied on points in the mini-table, the two-team rules for classification apply. If three or more teams are tied on points in the mini-table, they are ranked based on 1) wins in conference competition; 2) total goal differential in conference competition; 3) fewest losses in conference competition; 4) coin toss.

==== Southeast Conference ====
Pos	Team	Pld	W	L	T	GF	GA	GD	Pts	Qualification
1	Appalachian FC	10	6	1	3	25	12	+13	21	Southeast Conference playoffs
2	Georgia Revolution FC	10	4	2	4	26	12	+14	16	Southeast Conference playoffs
3	North Alabama SC	10	4	3	3	16	15	+1	15	Southeast Conference playoffs
4	Apotheos FC	10	3	2	5	13	10	+3	14	Southeast Conference playoffs
5	LSA Athletico Lanier	10	2	6	2	7	27	−20	8	
6	Georgia Storm	10	2	7	1	14	25	−11	7	

Source: NPSL
Rules for classification: 1) points; 2) head-to-head; 3) goal differential in head-to-head results; 4) wins; 5) total goal differential; 6) fewest losses; 7) coin toss. If three or more teams are tied on points, a mini-table involving only the tied teams is used, and teams are ranked in the mini-table on points. If two teams are tied on points in the mini-table, the two-team rules for classification apply. If three or more teams are tied on points in the mini-table, they are ranked based on 1) wins in conference competition; 2) total goal differential in conference competition; 3) fewest losses in conference competition; 4) coin toss.

== Playoffs ==
Note: Games are hosted by the highest seed unless noted otherwise

=== West Region Conference playoffs ===
==== Golden Gate Conference playoffs ====
Quarterfinals; June 25–26
**1**	**Sacramento Gold FC**	**3**
8	Sonoma County Sol	1
4	Contra Costa FC	1
5	**Academica SC**	**3**
**2**	**El Farolito**	**5**
7	Oakland SC	2
**3**	**Napa Valley 1839 FC**	**2***
6	FC Davis	1

Semifinal; July 9
**1**	**Sacramento Gold FC**	**4**
5	Academica SC	2
**2**	**El Farolito**	**5**
3	Napa Valley 1839 FC	1

Final; July 16
1	Sacramento Gold FC	0
2	**El Farolito**	**3**

Bold = winner
* = after extra time, ( ) = penalty shootout score

Golden Gate Conference Playoffs
June 25, 2022
12:00 PM PDT
Quarterfinals

El Farolito	5–2	Oakland SC
Martinez (yellow card) 3'; Cordoba (yellow card) 31'; Balieiro 35', 63'; Soto 40'; Torres (yellow card) 51'; Delgado (yellow card) 53'; Benson 66'; Becerra (yellow card) 68'; Arias 90'	Match Report	Borges 6' (yellow card) 6'; Littleton (yellow card) 29'; Mogharei (yellow card) 36'; Canchola (red card) 45'; Autran (yellow card) 45'; Muniz (red card) 45'; Kidane 85'; Mendoza (yellow card) 89'

Boxer Stadium
San Francisco, California
June 25, 2022
7:00 PM PDT
Quarterfinals

Sacramento Gold FC	3–1	Sonoma County Sol
Melgoza (yellow card) 45'; Pina 62', 67'; Vegaalban 80'	Match Report	Lopez-Parra (yellow card) 45' (goal) 53'

Capital Christian School
Sacramento, California
June 25, 2022
7:00 PM PDT
Quarterfinals

Napa Valley 1839 FC	2–1 (a.e.t.)	FC Davis
Martins 70'; Gomez-Avila (yellow card) 93'; Martins 104'	Match Report	Mejia 54'; Hoard (yellow card) 72'; Gastelum (yellow card) 92'

Dodd Stadium
Napa, California
June 26, 2022
3:00 PM PDT
Quarterfinals

Contra Costa FC	1–3	Academica SC
Castaneda (yellow card) 11'; Maravilla 24'; Laredo (yellow card) 90'	Match Report	Lopez 12'; Ceja 80' (yellow card) 84'; Mejia 83'

College Park High School
Pleasant Hill, California

July 9, 2022
12:00 PM PDT
Semifinals

El Farolito	5–1	Napa Valley 1839 FC
Arias 26', 53'; Delgado (yellow card) 35' (goal) 60'; Cordoba (yellow card) 47'; Lizarralde (yellow card) 67'; Benson 74'; Torres (yellow card) 85'; Higuera 90'	Match Report	Lopez 70', 73'; Pavon 48' (pen.)

Boxer Stadium
San Francisco, California
July 9, 2022
7:00 PM PDT
Semifinals

Sacramento Gold FC	4–2	Academica SC
Pando 48', 60'; Pina 51', 90'	Match Report	Guerrero (yellow card) 82'

Capital Christian School
Sacramento, California

July 16, 2022
7:30 PM PDT
Final

Sacramento Gold FC	0–3	El Farolito
Burkhart (yellow card) 27'; Padilla (yellow card) 41'; Pina (red card) 90'; Bethke (yellow card) 90'; Mazzoni (yellow card) 90'	Match Report	Cordoba (yellow card) 10'; Martinez 28'; Moreno (yellow card) 29'; Arias (yellow card) 38' (goal) 65'; Torres (yellow card) 45'; Benson 66'; Delgado (yellow card) 69'; Delgado (yellow card) 87'; Higuera (yellow card) 90'; Buitrago (red card) 90'

Capital Christian School
Sacramento, California

==== Pacific Conference playoffs ====
Semifinals; July 9–10
N1	Int. Portland Select FC	2
N2	**Crossfire Redmond**	**3***
S1	SC Brave Lions	2
S2	**FC Arizona**	**3**

Final; July 16
N2	**Crossfire Redmond**	**4**
S2	FC Arizona	0

Bold = winner
* = after extra time, ( ) = penalty shootout score

Pacific Conference Playoffs
July 9, 2022
5:00 PM PDT
Semifinals

SC Brave Lions	2–3	FC Arizona
Wright 7'; Yesayan 10'; Ohanyan (yellow card) 46'; Vinski (yellow card) 85'	Match Report	Moreno 6'; Sanchez 26' (yellow card) 46'; Karakas 71'; Garcia (yellow card) 87'; Garcia (yellow card) 87'

Glendale Sports Complex
Glendale, California
July 10, 2022
7:00 PM PDT
Semifinals

International Portland Select FC	2–3 (a.e.t.)	Crossfire Redmond
Guthrie (yellow card) 9'; Mendoza 34'; Allred 72'; Thomas (yellow card) 80'; Romac (yellow card) 90'	Match Report	Stewart 37'; Rincon 90'; Menzies 97'

Strasser Field
Portland, Oregon
July 16, 2022
4:00 PM PDT
Final

Crossfire Redmond	4–0	FC Arizona
Zamora 27'; Hussen 71'; Jones (yellow card) 73'; Barahona 76'; Brunell 87'	Match Report	Castellanos (yellow card) 56'; Bianchi (yellow card) 81'

Redmond High School
Redmond, Washington

=== South Region Conference playoffs ===
==== Gulf Coast Conference playoffs ====
Semifinals; July 13–15
1	**JAX Armada U23**	**7**
4	Pensacola FC	2
2	**Southern States SC**	**5**
3	New Orleans Jesters	4

Final; July 17
1	**JAX Armada U23**	**3**
2	Southern States SC	2

Bold = winner
* = after extra time, ( ) = penalty shootout score

Gulf Coast Conference Playoffs
July 13, 2022
7:00 PM EDT
Semifinals

Jacksonville Armada U-23	7–2	Pensacola FC
Chaves 16', 48', 53'; Dudley 49', 64'; Shanley (yellow card) 67'; Davis 74'; Taylor 76'	Match Report	Ciccarello 1', 15'; Owusu (yellow card) 37'; Hernandez (yellow card) 57'; Mills (yellow card) 63'; Kabambala (yellow card) 82'

Jangro Stadium
Jacksonville, Florida
July 15, 2022
7:30 PM EDT
Semifinals

Southern States SC	5–4	New Orleans Jesters
Hefele (yellow card) 20'; Walsh 26', 35'; Murillo 47', 75'; Jorgge 81'; Reid (yellow card) 87'	Match Report	Galizza (yellow card) 32' (goal) 77'; Choe (yellow card) 43'; Gomez (yellow card) 45'; Galizzi 45'; Blanche 57'; Judice 86'

The Oakes Training Center
Oak Grove, Mississippi

July 17, 2022
7:00 PM EDT
Final

Jacksonville Armada U-23	3–2	Southern States SC
Reasonover (yellow card) 17' (goal) 55'; Vaccaro 56'; Dahl (yellow card) 68'; Chaves (yellow card) 76'; Bowman (yellow card) 86'; Smith 90'	Match Report	Green 33'; Marcano (yellow card) 38'; Walsh (yellow card) 76'; Redmore (yellow card) 83'; Ferriol 90'

Jangro Stadium
Jacksonville, Florida

==== Heartland Conference playoffs ====
Semifinals; July 13
1	**Tulsa Athletic**	**0(4)**
4	Demize NPSL	0(2)
2	**OKC 1889 FC**	**4**
3	Sunflower State FC	2

Final; July 16
1	**Tulsa Athletic**	**5**
2	OKC 1889 FC	1

Bold = winner
* = after extra time, ( ) = penalty shootout score

Heartland Conference Playoffs
July 13, 2022
7:00 PM CDT
Semifinals

OKC 1889 FC	4–2	Sunflower State FC
Chiororo 8', 58'; Tanaka 37'; Bonaparte (yellow card) 42'; Johnson (yellow card) 54'; Nait 72'; Bilal (yellow card) 74'	Match Report	Peters 79'; Cotter (yellow card) 83'; Innes 90'

University of Science & Arts of Oklahoma
Chickasha, Oklahoma
July 13, 2022
7:30 PM CDT
Semifinals

Tulsa Athletic	0–0 (a.e.t.)	Demize NPSL
	Match Report	Smalley (yellow card) 41'; Watson (yellow card) 76'; Soares (yellow card) 93'; McConnell (yellow card) 93' (yellow-red card) 117'
Penalties
Diallo (penalty scored); Mello (penalty scored); Gordon (penalty scored); Ruiz (penalty scored)	4–2	Penalty scored Penalty missed

Athletic Community Field at Hicks Park
Tulsa, Oklahoma

July 16, 2022
7:30 PM CDT
Final

Tulsa Athletic	5–1	OKC 1889 FC
Ugbah 12'; Moreno 17'; Berry 21'; Diallo 66'; Carrasco 81'; Dean (yellow card) 88'	Match Report	Moser (yellow card) 39'; Bilal (yellow card) 43'; Bonaparte (yellow card) 58'; Nait (yellow card) 59' (yellow-red card) 87' (goal) 71'; Shepherd (yellow card) 85'

Athletic Community Field at Hicks Park
Tulsa, Oklahoma

==== Lone Star Conference playoffs ====
Semifinals; July 12
1	**Laredo Heat SC**	**0(3)**
4	Irving FC	0(1)
2	FC Brownsville	2(4)
3	**Corinthians FC of SA**	**2(5)**

Final; July 16
1	**Laredo Heat SC**	**3**
3	Corinthians FC of SA	0

Bold = winner
* = after extra time, ( ) = penalty shootout score

Lone Star Conference Playoffs
July 12, 2022
7:30 PM CDT
Semifinals

FC Brownsville	2–2 (a.e.t.)	Corinthians FC of San Antonio
Diegues 12'; Silva (yellow card) 43'; Espinoza 45'; Gonzalez (yellow card) 101'	Match Report	Espino 23' (yellow card) 92'; Bonatto 45'; Gonzalez (yellow card) 50'
Penalties
	4–5

Brownsville Sports Park
Brownsville, Texas
July 12, 2022
8:15 PM CDT
Semifinals

Laredo Heat SC	0–0 (a.e.t.)	Irving FC
Leonoglou (yellow card) 17'; Rivera (yellow card) 79'	Match Report	Assamoi (yellow card) 12'
Penalties
Ordonez (penalty scored); Nielsen (penalty scored); West (penalty missed); Takanaka (penalty scored)	3–1	Penalty missed Penalty scored

Texas A&M International University Soccer Complex
Laredo, Texas

July 16, 2022
8:15 PM CDT
Final

Laredo Heat SC	3–0	Corinthians FC of San Antonio
Horbunov 28'; Romero (yellow card) 31'; Wilson (yellow card) 33'; Rivera 46'; Nielsen (yellow card) 73'; Ordonez 78'	Match Report	Ferrer (yellow card) 36'; Fahara (yellow card) 52'

Texas A&M International University Soccer Complex
Laredo, Texas

==== Sunshine Conference playoffs ====
Semifinals; July 13–15
1	Miami Beach CF	2(2)
4	**Naples United FC**	**2(3)**
2	Miami United FC	1(2)
3	**CF Panthers SC**	**1(4)**

Final; July 17
4	**Naples United FC**	**1**
3	CF Panthers SC	0

Bold = winner
* = after extra time, ( ) = penalty shootout score

1. ^{B} Miami United FC was stripped of its playoff hosting privileges due to an incident in the June 29 match against Central Florida Panthers SC. Instead, #2 seed Miami played at #3 Central Florida's home venue at Lake Brantley High School.
Sunshine Conference Playoffs
July 13, 2022
7:30 PM EDT
Semifinals

Miami Beach CF	2–2 (a.e.t.)	Naples United FC
Seferlis (yellow card) 8'; Frean (yellow card) 23'; Ten Lopez 27', 42'; Esposito (yellow card) 49'; Zapata (yellow card) 83'; Aldunate (yellow card) 84'; Blanco (yellow card) 84'; Hincapie (yellow card) 87'	Match Report	Avila 8'; Maldonado (yellow card) 19'; Diaz (yellow card) 31'; Brodsky (yellow card) 41'; Chaparro (yellow card) 67'; Brown (yellow card) 70'; Gonzalez 76'; Vazquez (yellow card) 90'; Reneau (yellow card) 90'; Mohamed (yellow card) 120'
Penalties
	2–3

MSOC Buccaneer Field
Miami Shores, Florida
July 15, 2022
8:00 PM EDT
Semifinals

CF Panthers SC	1–1 (a.e.t.)	Miami United FC
Davis 20'; Ahl (yellow card) 62'; Restrepo (yellow card) 73'; Fleury (yellow card) 81'; Sandidge (yellow card) 83'; Fleshood (yellow card) 84'; Paul (yellow card) 89'	Match Report	Dominguez 30'; Benito (yellow card) 51'; Ritondale (yellow card) 60'
Penalties
	4–2

Lake Brantley High School
Altamonte Springs, Florida

July 17, 2022
6:00 PM EDT
Final

CF Panthers SC	0–1	Naples United FC
Sandidge (yellow card) 60'; Ahl (yellow card) 66'; Piñeyro (yellow card) 90+3'; D'Amico (red card) 90+4'	Match Report	Lewis (yellow card) 11'; Reneau 67' (yellow card) 73'; Cespedes (yellow card) 68'

Lake Brantley High School
Altamonte Springs, Florida

=== East Region Conference playoffs ===
==== Keystone Conference playoffs ====
Semifinals; July 15
1	**FC Motown**	**2**
4	Philly Ukrainian Nationals	0
2	Electric City Shock SC	1
3	**West Chester United**	**3**

Final; July 17
1	**FC Motown**	**2(4)**
3	West Chester United	2(2)

Bold = winner
* = after extra time, ( ) = penalty shootout score

Keystone Conference Playoffs
July 15, 2022
7:00 PM EDT
Semifinals

FC Motown	2–0	Philadelphia Ukrainian Nationals
Ashitey (yellow card) 40'; Catania 51' (yellow card) 58'; Perez (yellow card) 68'; Rodriguez (yellow card) 76'; Fala 78'	Match Report	Forrest (yellow card) 32'; Harmon (yellow card) 41'; Combs (yellow card) 45'; Moyer (yellow card) 55'

Ranger Stadium
Madison, New Jersey
July 15, 2022
7:00 PM EDT
Semifinals

Electric City Shock SC	1–3	West Chester United SC
Cruz (yellow card) 34'; Parsons 38' (yellow card) 42'; Rushmore (yellow card) 43' (yellow-red card) 44'	Match Report	Bachstein 4'; Hewes 32'; Tima 56'; Newcombe (yellow card) 88'

University of Scranton
Scranton, Pennsylvania

July 17, 2022
6:00 PM EDT
Final

FC Motown	2–2 (a.e.t.)	West Chester United SC
Cordeiro (yellow card) 43' (goal) 94'; Catania 45' (yellow card) 67'; Voltaire (yellow card) 65'; Pompe (yellow card) 97'; Holland (yellow card) 115'	Match Report	Jammes 68'; Newcombe (yellow card) 74'; Bachstein 92' (pen.)
Penalties
	4–2

MSU Soccer Park at Pittser Field
Montclair, New Jersey

==== Mid-Atlantic Conference playoffs ====
Semifinals; July 13
1	**Alexandria Reds**	**3**
4	FC Frederick	1
2	**N. Virginia United FC**	**4**
3	Virginia Beach City FC	1

Final; July 16
1	**Alexandria Reds**	**6**
2	N. Virginia United FC	5

Bold = winner
* = after extra time, ( ) = penalty shootout score

Mid-Atlantic Conference Playoffs
July 13, 2022
7:00 PM EDT
Semifinals

Alexandria Reds	3–1	FC Frederick
Tshiani 18'; Barnard 27' (yellow card) 55'; Brown 45'; Paez (yellow card) 70'	Match Report	Norris 45'

Limerick Field
Alexandria, Virginia
July 13, 2022
7:00 PM EDT
Semifinals

Northern Virginia United FC	4–1	Virginia Beach City FC
15' (o.g.); McMillen (yellow card) 56'; Humm 68'; Kimiavi 69'; Berg 80'	Match Report	Cristales 26'

Nike Park
Fairfax, Virginia

July 16, 2022
7:00 PM EDT
Final

Alexandria Reds	6–5	Virginia Beach City FC
Tshiani 13'; Barnard 15', 28', 89' (yellow card) 40'; Hendi (yellow card) 42'; Lam 47' (yellow card) 74'; Igarashi (yellow card) 50'; Brown 90'; Joseph (red card) 90'; Taylor (yellow card) 90'	Match Report	Villeda 27', 87'; Berg 32'; Benavides (yellow card) 32'; Quill 39'; Kiely 54'; Nohra (yellow card) 76'; Welsh (red card) 90'

Limerick Field
Alexandria, Virginia

==== North Atlantic Conference playoffs ====
Semifinals; July 13
1	Hartford City FC	0
4	**New York Shockers**	**2**
2	Valeo FC	1
3	**Cedar Stars FC**	**2**

Final; July 16
4	**New York Shockers**	**1***
3	Cedar Stars FC	0

Bold = winner
* = after extra time, ( ) = penalty shootout score

North Atlantic Conference Playoffs
July 13, 2022
7:00 PM EDT
Semifinals

Hartford City FC	0–2	New York Shockers
Lyons (yellow card) 39'; Williams (yellow card) 76'; Grant (yellow card) 90'	Match Report	Winglosky 48'; LaVallee 75'

Dillon Stadium
Hartford, Connecticut
July 13, 2022
7:00 PM EDT
Semifinals

Valeo FC	1–2	Cedar Stars FC
Bell 4'; Namusse (yellow card) 59'; Rainford (yellow card) 64'	Match Report	Studenhofft 6'; Green (yellow card) 15'; Villarreal (yellow card) 23'; Zholendz 64' (yellow card) 64'; Garcia (yellow card) 71'; Lagarde (yellow card) 90+4'

Solomon Schechter Day School
Newton, Massachusetts

July 16, 2022
7:00 PM EDT
Final

Cedar Stars FC	0–1 (a.e.t.)	New York Shockers
Villarreal (yellow card) 70'; Green (yellow card) 91'; LaTorre (yellow card) 112'; Shust (yellow card) 118'	Match Report	Espindola (yellow card) 94' (goal) 120'; Adefioye (yellow card) 95'; Tebo (yellow card) 115'; Stewart-Drysdale (yellow card) 120'; Rouse (yellow card) 120'

Faller Field
Middletown, New York

==== Southeast Conference playoffs ====
Semifinals; July 13
1	**Appalachian FC**	**4**
4	Apotheos FC	1
2	Georgia Revolution FC	0
3	**North Alabama SC**	**1**

Final; July 16
1	**Appalachian FC**	**6**
3	North Alabama SC	2

Bold = winner
* = after extra time, ( ) = penalty shootout score

Southeast Conference Playoffs
July 13, 2022
7:30 PM EDT
Semifinals

Georgia Revolution FC	0–1	North Alabama SC
Tambadu (yellow card) 38'; Harlley (red card) 93'; Jones (red card) 93'	Match Report	Guffey (yellow card) 53'; Mcdonald 71'; Bell (yellow card) 92'

Warhawk Stadium
McDonough, Georgia
July 13, 2022
7:30 PM EDT
Semifinals

Appalachian FC	4–1	Apotheos FC
Lange 11'; Bates 53'; Williams 55'; Curtis (yellow card) 65'; Holbrook 86'	Match Report	Downey (yellow card) 62'; Garcia 65' (yellow card) 90'

ASU Soccer Stadium
Boone, North Carolina
Attendance: 1,364

July 16, 2022
7:30 PM EDT
Final

Appalachian FC	6–2	North Alabama SC
Fabricio 22', 56', 71'; Lange 29', 38' (yellow card) 39'; Smith (yellow card) 64'; Bolton 86'	Match Report	Young 26'; Tizapa (yellow card) 65'; Guffey 85'

ASU Soccer Stadium
Boone, North Carolina

=== Regional and National playoffs ===
Regional Quarterfinals; July 19
MW4	**Duluth FC**	**3**
MW5	FC Columbus	1
MW3	**Cleveland SC**	**2**
MW6	Pittsburgh Hotspurs	1

Regional semifinals July 16–22
MW1	**Muskegon Risers**	**5**
MW4	Duluth FC	2
MW2	Med City FC	0
MW3	**Cleveland SC**	**2**
GG1	Sacramento Gold FC	0
GG2	**El Farolito**	**3**
PN2	**Crossfire Redmond**	**4**
PS2	FC Arizona	0
S1	**JAX Armada U23**	**3**
S4	Naples United FC	1
S2	**Tulsa Athletic**	**0(6)**
S3	Laredo Heat SC	0(5)
E1	**FC Motown**	**4**
E4	New York Shockers	1
E2	Alexandria Reds	1
E3	**Appalachian FC**	**2**

Regional Finals; July 23–24
MW1	**Muskegon Risers**	**1**
MW3	Cleveland SC	0
W1	El Farolito	2(2)
W2	**Crossfire Redmond**	**2(4)**
S1	JAX Armada U23	0
S2	**Tulsa Athletic**	**2**
E1	**FC Motown**	**3**
E3	Appalachian FC	0

National semifinals July 30
1	Muskegon Risers	0
4	**Crossfire Redmond**	**3**
2	Tulsa Athletic	1
3	**FC Motown**	**2**

National Final; August 6
4	Crossfire Redmond	3
3	**FC Motown**	**4**

Bold = winner
* = after extra time, ( ) = penalty shootout score

1. ^{B} The Midwest Region semifinals and final were hosted by Muskegon Risers at Oakridge High School (Egelston Township, MI).
2. ^{C} The remaining four teams are reseeded for the national semifinals.

=== Regional Quarterfinals ===
Midwest Region Quarterfinals
July 19, 2022
7:00 PM EDT
Quarterfinals

Cleveland SC	2–1	Pittsburgh Hotspurs
Beattie (yellow card) 42'; Bell 58'; Hryszko 90' (yellow card) 90'	Match Report	Emanuel (yellow card) 45'; Mohney 68'

Krenzler Field
Cleveland, Ohio
July 19, 2022
7:00 PM CDT
Quarterfinals

Duluth FC	3–1	FC Columbus
Domaratskyy 1'; Perry 50'; Chastey 90'; Pike (yellow card) 90'	Match Report	Chilton 86'

Ordean Stadium
Duluth, Minnesota

=== Regional Semifinals ===
West Region Semifinals
July 16, 2022
4:00 PM PDT
Semifinals

Crossfire Redmond	4–0	FC Arizona
Zamora 27'; Hussen 71'; Jones (yellow card) 73'; Barahona 76'; Brunell 87'	Match Report	Castellanos (yellow card) 56'; Bianchi (yellow card) 81'

Redmond High School
Redmond, Washington
July 16, 2022
7:30 PM PDT
Semifinals

Sacramento Gold FC	0–3	El Farolito
Burkhart (yellow card) 27'; Padilla (yellow card) 41'; Bethke (yellow card) 90'; Mazzoni (yellow card) 90'; Pina (red card) 90'	Match Report	Cordoba (yellow card) 10'; Martinez 28'; Moreno (yellow card) 29'; Arias (yellow card) 38' (goal) 65'; Torres (yellow card) 45'; Benson 66'; Delgado (yellow card) 69'; Delgado (yellow card) 87'; Higuera (yellow card) 90'; Buitrago (red card) 90'

Capital Christian School
Sacramento, California

South Region Semifinal 1
July 20, 2022
6:00 PM EDT
Semifinals

Jacksonville Armada U-23	3–1	Naples United FC
Birkelund 78', 90+8'; Davis 90+1' (yellow card) 90+4'; Ierides (yellow card) 90+7' (yellow-red card) 90+7'	Match Report	Gonzalez (yellow card) 31' (yellow-red card) 90+7'; Brown 36' (yellow card) 38'; Lewis (yellow card) 45'; Meza (yellow card) 72'; Bordsky (yellow card) 84'; Resquin (yellow card) 87'; Comie (yellow card) 89'

Jangro Stadium
Jacksonville, Florida

Northeast Region Semifinals
July 20, 2022
7:00 PM EDT
Semifinals

Alexandria Reds	1–2	Appalachian FC
Taylor (yellow card) 28'; Tshiani 50'	Match Report	Fabricio 1'; Smith 13'; Luoma (yellow card) 9'; Healey (yellow card) 18'; Curtis (yellow card) 67'

Limerick Field
Alexandria, Virginia
July 20, 2022
7:30 PM EDT
Semifinals

FC Motown	4–1	New York Shockers
Voltaire (yellow card) 37' (goal) 39'; Catania (yellow card) 42' (goal) 47', 72'; Rodriguez 77'; Achterkamp (yellow card) 82'	Match Report	Adefioye (yellow card) 38'; LaVallee (yellow card) 64'; Mendrysa (yellow card) 82'; Josepher 89'

MSU Soccer Park at Pittser Field
Montclair, New Jersey

South Region Semifinal 2
July 20, 2022
7:30 PM CDT
Semifinals

Tulsa Athletic	0–0 (a.e.t.)	Laredo Heat SC
Ugbah (yellow card) 55'; Quashie (yellow card) 102' (yellow-red card) 112'; Harris (yellow card) 112' (yellow-red card) 112'; Lopez (yellow card) 113'; Alvarez (yellow card) 116'	Match Report	Romero (yellow card) 42'
Penalties
Arias (penalty scored); Grant (penalty scored); Ruiz (penalty scored); Reyes (penalty missed); Carrasco (penalty scored); Oliveira (penalty scored); Torres (penalty scored)	6–5	Penalty scored Penalty missed

Hicks Park
Tulsa, Oklahoma
Midwest Region Semifinals
July 22, 2022
4:30 PM EDT
Semifinals

Med City FC	0–2	Cleveland SC
Roberts (yellow card) 38'; Hart (yellow card) 42'; Patel (yellow card) 64'	Match Report	Brennan 16'; Nagucki 56'

Oakridge High School
Egelston Township, Michigan
July 22, 2022
7:30 PM EDT
Semifinals

Muskegon Risers	5–2	Duluth FC
Takawira Jr 17', 44', 60', 65' (yellow card) 41'; Petrovic (yellow card) 50'; Maye 53'	Match Report	Thornton 2'; Wessels 10'; Domaratskyy (yellow card) 19'; Solares (yellow card) 34'

Oakridge High School
Egelston Township, Michigan

=== Regional Finals ===
West Region Final
July 23, 2022
12:00 PM PDT
Final

El Farolito	2–2 (a.e.t.)	Crossfire Redmond
Delgado 50'; Martinez (yellow card) 72'; Arias 89' (pen.); Santos (yellow card) 90'; Becerra (yellow card) 104'; Benson (yellow card) 115'; Cordoba (yellow card) 115'; Lizarralde (yellow card) 120'	Match Report	Jones 57'; Miller 90'
Penalties
Lizarralde (penalty missed); Torres (penalty scored); Martínez (penalty missed); Santos (penalty scored)	2–4	(penalty scored) Buchanan; (penalty scored) Gallagher; (penalty missed) Rincon; (penalty scored) Hussen; (penalty scored) Menzies

Boxer Stadium
San Francisco, California

South Region Final
July 23, 2022
6:30 PM EDT
Final

Jacksonville Armada U-23	0–2	Tulsa Athletic
Davis (yellow card) 61'	Match Report	Diallo 69'; Grant 71'

Jangro Stadium
Jacksonville, Florida

Northeast Region Final
July 23, 2022
7:30 PM EDT
Final

FC Motown	3–0	Appalachian FC
Ashitey (yellow card) 7'; Pompe 27'; Peterson (yellow card) 56'; Cordeiro (yellow card) 59'; Fala 71'; Holland 75'	Match Report	Holbrook (yellow card) 90'

Ranger Stadium
Madison, New Jersey

Midwest Region Final
July 24, 2022
3:00 PM EDT
Final

Muskegon Risers	1–0	Cleveland SC
Barone (yellow card) 7'; Hanson (yellow card) 59'; Howell (yellow card) 69'; Petrovic (yellow card) 81'; Belcastro 90'	Match Report	Schmidt (yellow card) 23' (yellow-red card) 90'; Tregansin (yellow card) 29'; Jonke (yellow card) 62'; Cvecko (yellow card) 90' (yellow-red card) 90+'; Hryszko (yellow card) 90'

Oakridge High School
Egelston Township, Michigan

=== National Semifinals ===
July 30, 2022
7:30 PM EDT
Semifinals

Muskegon Risers	0–3	Crossfire Redmond
Howell (yellow card) 29'; Barone (yellow card) 30'; Bentley (yellow card) 86'	Match Report	Rincon 24'; Grey 36'; Stewart 78'

Oakridge High School
Egelston Township, Michigan
July 30, 2022
7:30 PM CDT
Semifinals

Tulsa Athletic	1–2	FC Motown
Berry 47'; Lopez (yellow card) 84'	Match Report	Rodriguez 85'; Holland (yellow card) 69' (goal) 89'

Union High School Soccer Stadium
Tulsa, Oklahoma

=== 2022 NPSL National Championship ===
August 6, 2022
7:30 PM EDT

FC Motown	4–3	Crossfire Redmond
Peterson 8'; Catania 29' (yellow card) 97'; Ashitey (yellow card) 42'; Voltaire (yellow card) 68'; Rodriguez 81', 90'; Da Fonte (yellow card) 90+3'	Match Report; Broadcast	Menzies (yellow card) 28' (goal) 49'; Hussen (yellow card) 33'; Rincon 43'; Haffadi 45+3' (yellow card) 79'; John (yellow card) 90+7'

MSU Soccer Park at Pittser Field
Montclair, New Jersey
Attendance: 2,065
Referee: Brian Cordova-Munoz

Paul Patterson, Justen Lopez

Ignacio Guzman

Championship MVP: Coby Handy Jean Rodriguez (MOT)
