= Major Arena Soccer League 3 =

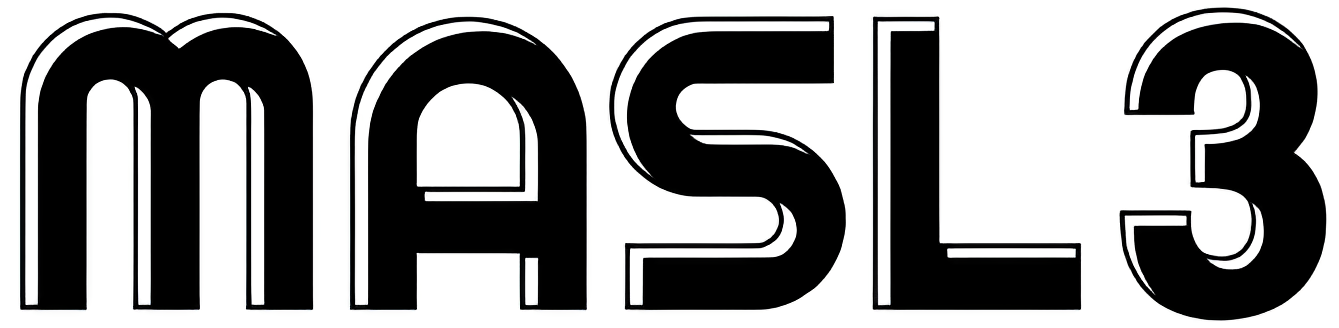
- Founded: 2020
- Confederation: USASA
- Number of clubs: 20
- Level on pyramid: 3
- Domestic cup: U.S. Open for Indoor Soccer
- Current champions: Delaware City FC (2026)
- Website: www.masl3.com

The Major Arena Soccer League 3 (MASL 3) is a North American indoor soccer league that serves as the developmental league of the Major Arena Soccer League and MASL 2.

== History ==
Original Logo (2020-2022)

Established in the summer of 2020, MASL 3 is the third tier of indoor soccer in North America under the MASL banner. Grand Rapids Wanderers and Muskegon Risers II were the first two member clubs announced with the Omaha Kings FC and Sunflower State FC named the same week. Wichita Wings II and Springfield Demize were also added to the inaugural MASL3 lineup.

With the ongoing COVID-19 pandemic just four teams (Grand Rapids and Muskegon sat out) competed in the inaugural season of 2020–21. Omaha Kings FC finished the six-game regular season unbeaten and went on to capture the Heartland Invitational Cup with victories over Wichita Wings II (11-8) and Sunflower State FC (13-7).

In September 2024, Major Arena Soccer League announced the unification of several former PASL member clubs to join MASL 3 in addition to a new women's league (MASL W).

== Teams ==
Division	Team	City	Arena	Joined	MASL/MASL2 affiliate
Atlantic	Baltimore Kings	Baltimore, MD	Goals Baltimore	2021	Salisbury SteaksBaltimore Blast
Atlantic	Cumberland Valley SC	Hagerstown, MD	Hagerstown Field House	2026	
Atlantic	Delaware City FC	Wilmington, DE	Kirkwood Sports Complex	2026	
Atlantic	Maryland Storm	Westminster, MD	Carroll County Indoor Sports Center	2025	
Atlantic	Northern Virginia FC	Winchester, VA	Winchester Sportsplex	2021	
Atlantic	Virginia Marauders FC	Winchester, VA	Winchester Sportsplex	2022	
East	Sahara Gunners	Buffalo, NY	Kenan Center Arena	2024	
East	Cleveland Samba SC	Cleveland, OH	Soccer Soccerplex	2024	
East	Roc City Boom	Rochester, NY	Rochester Sports Garden	2024	
East	Rockford FC	Rockford, IL	Mercyhealth Sportscore 2	2026	
East	Syracuse Knights	Marcellus, NY	Ultimate Goal	2026	Utica City FC
East	Youngstown Nighthawks	Youngstown, OH	Farmer Jim's Sports Complex	2024	
Great Lakes North	Cincinnati Swerve	Cincinnati, OH	Gametime Training Center	2024	
Great Lakes North	Detroit Waza Flo	Detroit, MI	TOCA Soccer and Sports Center Novi East	2024	
Great Lakes North	Kalamazoo United	Kalamazoo, MI	Let's Play Portage	2024	
Great Lakes North	Muskegon Risers	Muskegon, MI	TOCA Soccer and Sports Center Novi East	2024	
South	Deportivo Shaolin	Kansas City, KS	Wichita's Edge Sports Complex	2026	
South	OKC Certified Lions	Oklahoma City, OK	Let's Play ISA	2024	
South	RGV Barracudas FC	Brownsville, TX	Barracudas Park	2024	
South	Springfield Demize	Springfield, MO	Lake Country Soccer	2024	
South	The Bold Dream FC	Austin, TX	SoccerZone South Austin	2026	
South	Wichita Selection	Wichita, KS	Let's Play Wichita	2024	

=== Former teams ===
- Austin Emerald FC (2024–2025) – Inactive
- Brew City United (2024–2025)
- Central Texas Coyotes (2024–2025)
- DMV Gunners (2023–2024)
- Des Moines United FC (2021–22) – rebranded as Iowa Demon Hawks and moved to MASL 2
- Elizabethtown Ignite (2024)
- FC Indiana Lions (2024–2025)
- FC Wichita (2021–22)
- Fredericksburg Fire FC (2021–24) – Inactive
- Grand Rapids Wanderers (2020–21)
- Houston Bolt FC (2024–2025)
- Indiana United FC (2024–2025)
- Jackson Boom (2024) – Inactive
- Kansas City Barilleros (2024–25) – moved to MLISX
- Muskegon Risers II (2020–21)
- Omaha Kings FC (2020–21) – moved to MLIS
- Philadelphia Spartans (2021–25)
- Salisbury Steaks (2023–24) – moved to MASL 2
- San Antonio Eagles (2024–2025) – Inactive
- Skyline City CF (2021–22)
- Springfield Demize (2020–22)
- Summit City (2024–2025)
- Sunflower State FC (2020–22)
- West Michigan Wrath (2024–25)

== Champions ==
Season	Champion	Runner-up	Result
2020–21	Omaha Kings FC	Sunflower State FC	13–7
2021–22	East: Northern Virginia FC; Midwest: Springfield Demize	Fredericksburg Fire FC; Des Moines United	12–7; 11–6
2022–23	Northern Virginia FC	Philadelphia Spartans	9–8 OT
2023–24	Northern Virginia FC	Philadelphia Spartans	17–9
2024–25	RGV Barracudas FC	Roc City Boom	8–6
2025–26	Delaware City FC	Muskegon Risers	10–6
