= Syracuse FC =

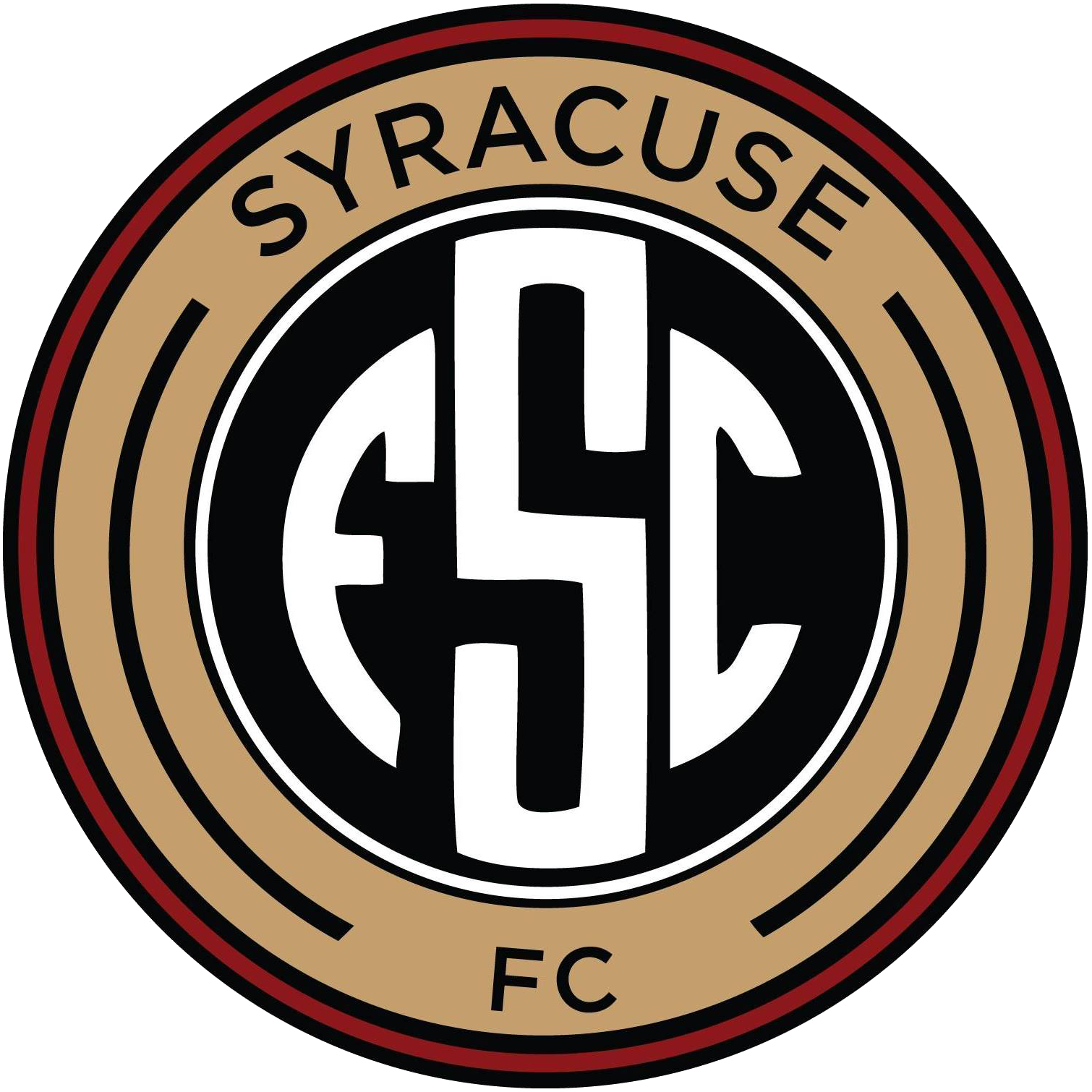
- Full name: Syracuse Football Club
- Founded: February 8, 2017; 9 years ago
- Stadium: Chuck Wilbur Field; Syracuse, New York
- Capacity: 2,000
- President: Jaro Zawislan
- General Manager: Matt Tantalo
- Head Coach: Corey Fonseca
- League: NPSL; UPSL
- 2019: East Conference: 5th Playoffs: DNQ
- Website: syracusefc.net
Home colors

Syracuse FC is a soccer team based in Syracuse, New York. They debuted in the National Premier Soccer League in May 2017. The team colors are white, black, gold and maroon.

== History ==
Syracuse FC was announced as a National Premier Soccer League expansion team on February 8, 2017. On the day of the announcement, the leadership group was announced with former professional player and college men's soccer coach Jaro Zawislan serving as President and Matt Tantalo acting as both General Manager and the inaugural Head Coach. Former Major Indoor Soccer League goalkeeper Joe Papaleo would also serve as the team's Vice President and head of soccer operations.

The team played its inaugural match on May 20, 2017, at home in Onondaga Community College's David W. Murphy Field (now known as Chuck Wilbur Field) against defending NPSL National Champions AFC Cleveland. Forward Slavisa Ubiparipovic scored the first goal in team history via a penalty kick to tie the game in the 33rd minute, but Syracuse went on to drop the match, 5-1, in front of 2000 fans.

In March 2020, Syracuse was announced as an expansion side in the United Premier Soccer League, a national amateur league, with plans to begin play in the Northeast Conference's Western N.Y. Division for the 2020 Spring Season.

== Staff ==
Position	Staff
President	Jaro Zawislan
Vice President/General Manager	Matt Tantalo
Vice President, Soccer Operations	Joe Papaleo
Head Coach	Corey Fonseca
Assistant Coach	Darek Panol
Assistant Coach	Dan Ramin

Last updated: June 16, 2020
Source: Leadership, Management, Coaching Staff

== Year-by-year ==
Year	League	Regular season	Playoffs	U.S. Open Cup	Notes
2017	NPSL	7th, East Conference	Did not qualify	Ineligible	
2018	NPSL	6th, East Conference	Did not qualify	Did not qualify	
2019	NPSL	5th, East Conference	Did not qualify	Did not qualify	
2020	NPSL	Season cancelled due to COVID-19 pandemic			
2021	NPSL	6th, Rust Belt Conference	Did not qualify	Did not qualify	
2022	NPSL	6th, North Atlantic Conference	Did not qualify	Did not qualify	
2023	NPSL	5th, North Atlantic Conference	Did not qualify	Did not qualify	
