= FC Columbus =

- Full name: Football Club Columbus
- Nickname(s): The Saints
- Founded: February 8, 2018; 7 years ago
- Stadium: The Wellington School; Upper Arlington, Ohio
- Capacity: 1,750
- Owner: Maziya Chete
- Head Coach: Maziya Chete & Seymour Alleyne
- League: National Premier Soccer League
- Website: https://www.fccolumbus95.com/
Home colors	Away colors	Alternate colors

FC Columbus is a semi-professional American soccer club based in Upper Arlington, Ohio, a suburb of Columbus. The team is a member of the National Premier Soccer League (NPSL) and currently plays its home matches at The Wellington School.

== History ==
Initially founded in 1995 as the Santos Futbol Club of Columbus, a youth training academy, the team was announced on January 12, 2018 as a member of the NPSL ahead of the 2018 season. Maziya Chete, the team's owner and founder of Santos FC, was named the team's first associate head coach with Seymour Alleyne also taking an associate role.

During the first match against the Milwaukee Torrent on May 13, 2018, the local supporters affectionately nicknamed the club "The Saints" in honor of the link between the youth club TVSA Santos FC and FC Columbus. The game ended in a 2-2 draw with Damani Camara scoring the team's first goal in the 5th minute before scoring another in the 44th.

Despite not playing in the same conference, Columbus has a rivalry with fellow Ohio-based team Cleveland SC which also joined the NPSL in 2018. The two teams play yearly in early season friendlies, affectionately called the "CheeseBarn Derby" after the famous Grandpa's Cheesebarn & Sweeties Chocolates located between the two cities in Ashland, Ohio. As of 2020 both teams currently hold a win, each earning a 3-2 victory in 2018, and a draw (2019) with neither actually taking the advantage in the rivalry.

== Year-by-year ==
Year	League	Regular season	Playoffs	U.S. Open Cup	Avg. attendance
2018	NPSL	3rd, Great Lakes Conference	did not qualify	Ineligible	—
2019	NPSL	5th, Great Lakes Conference	did not qualify	did not qualify	—
2020	NPSL	Season cancelled due to COVID-19 pandemic			
2021	NPSL	3rd, Great Lakes Conference	did not qualify	did not qualify	—
2022	NPSL	2nd, Great Lakes Conference	Regional Quarterfinals	did not qualify	—
2023	NPSL	7th, Great Lakes Conference	did not qualify	did not qualify	—
