= Cleveland SC =

American semi-professional soccer club

- Full name: Cleveland Soccer Club
- Founded: February 19, 2018; 8 years ago
- Stadium: George Finnie Stadium (Berea, Ohio)
- Capacity: 7,800
- Owner(s): Samuel Seibert (Cleveland SC Corp.)
- Head coach: Joe Jovanovski
- League: National Premier Soccer League
- 2025: Great Lakes Conference: 5th; Playoffs: Did not qualify
- Website: clevelandsc.com
| Home colors | Away colors |

Cleveland SC is an American semi-professional soccer club based in the Greater Cleveland, Ohio region. Cleveland competes in the National Premier Soccer League (NPSL) as part of the Midwest Region's Great Lakes Conference. The club was established on February 19, 2018, taking over from the recently defunct AFC Cleveland as the city's representative in the NPSL.

Cleveland SC (CSC) plays home matches at Drive Morris Stadium in North Olmsted, Ohio, but has played at four other stadiums during its existence: Don Shula Stadium, George Finnie Stadium, Lakewood Stadium, and Krenzler Field. Samuel Seibert, a local banker and administrator, founded the club after being approached by a group of former AFC Cleveland players who wanted to see competitive soccer retained in the Cleveland area. Vlad Muresan is the third head coach in club history and has been in charge since April 2022.

Through six seasons, Cleveland SC has won three conference and two region championships, has never missed the NPSL playoffs, and has appeared twice in the U.S. Open Cup. Cleveland has rivalries with fellow Ohioan NPSL clubs Akron City FC and FC Columbus and previously contested the Rust Belt Derby with FC Buffalo and Detroit City FC. Notable players to have appeared for the club include Puerto Rico international Ryan López, as well as Ohio natives Riley Grant and Ben Fitzpatrick, while Louie Rolko served as an assistant coach.

== History ==
For the previous six seasons, from 2012 to 2017, AFC Cleveland had represented the city of Cleveland in the National Premier Soccer League. That run included an NPSL national championship in 2016, as well as two appearances in the U.S. Open Cup. However, the club was expelled from the NPSL due to "not [being] in good financial standing with the league." That announcement came on December 12, 2017, just months before the new season was set to begin.

=== Inaugural season ===
"Cleveland SC is going to bring a fanbase filled with pride. Cleveland has a soccer fan base that is a sleeping giant and we intend to tap into that immediately. Cleveland has the best sports fans anywhere and our opponents will learn that quickly."

— Samuel Seibert, club owner and president

The catalysts for founding Cleveland SC were two former AFC Cleveland players, Coletun Long and Chris Cvecko. According to Long, the two "started having a conversation in the car and talked further in a Chipotle parking lot outside the city. We wrote down ideas and called teammates and others previously associated with AFC Cleveland." One of those people contacted was Samuel Seibert, a Northeast Ohio native who had been on the media relations staff for AFC Cleveland. He went on to take the lead on the NPSL expansion process, culminating in an official announcement of Cleveland SC as an NPSL expansion club on February 19, 2018. That announcement came just 90 days before the club was set to play its first regular season match.

Prior to the season beginning, CSC announced that the club would play its inaugural season at Don Shula Stadium, located in University Heights, Ohio on the campus of John Carroll University. In conjunction with local designers, a crest and kits featuring an orange and black color combination were launched in mid-March, less than a month before the club's inaugural match. Ryan Osborne was announced as the club's first head coach and the first two matches in club history took part in April, the inaugural edition of the Cheese Barn Derby against FC Columbus. The first-ever league match in CSC history took place on May 19, 2018, ending in a 2–0 victory over Rochester Lancers courtesy of goals from Declan McGivern and American futsal international Antonio Manfut. After a second-place finish in the Midwest-East, the club qualified for the playoffs and defeated Erie Commodores in the quarterfinals before falling to AFC Ann Arbor in the regional semifinals.

== Colors and badge ==
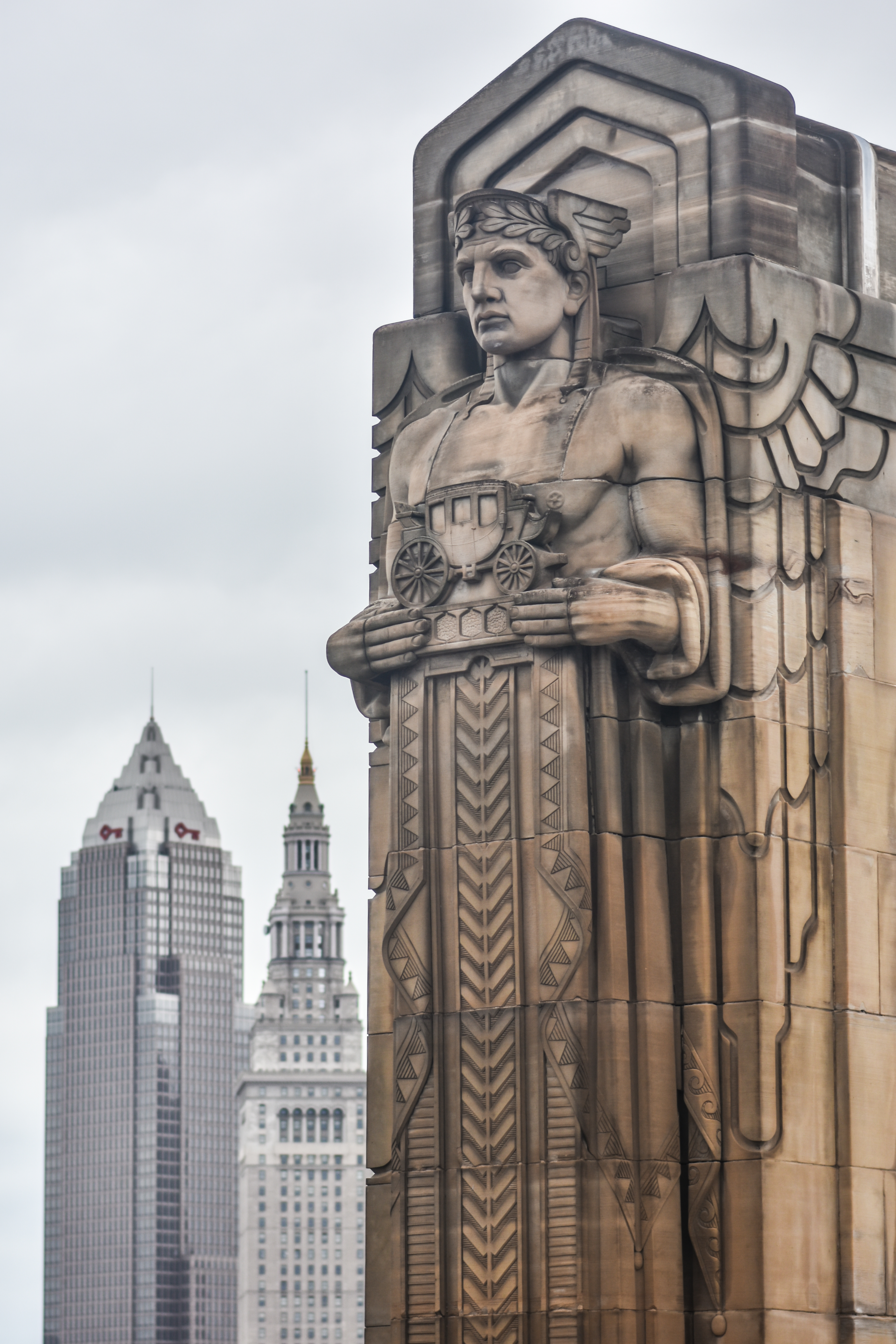
The Guardians of Traffic statues are modeled after the Greek god Hermes and are considered to be an icon of the city of Cleveland.

When Cleveland SC was founded, the first part of the club identity to be decided was the colors: orange and black. The color scheme was chosen because of its uniqueness in the NPSL and therefore an ability to visually stand out from the crowd. Orange was chosen to represent the sunsets over Lake Erie that are common in the Cleveland summer. Although the colors are visually similar to the Cleveland Browns of the National Football League, the Cleveland SC colors were not inspired by the Browns identity.

The club crest was designed by Mike Kubinski of Cleveland Clothing Co., a local T-shirt company headquartered in Lakewood, Ohio. The name and founding year of the club, stylized in Roman numerals, feature at the top of the badge. An image of one of the Guardians of Traffic statues comprises the focal point of the badge. The statues are located on the Hope Memorial Bridge in Downtown Cleveland and are also the namesake of the Cleveland Guardians of Major League Baseball, although the baseball team didn't adopt that nickname until 2021. Club owner Samuel Seibert said the reason for the choice was that "one of the coolest things in the city of Cleveland that wasn't getting enough publicity at the time was our transportation bridge", and because the bridge connects the east and west sides of the city.

Cleveland SC's original kits were designed by club creative director Cory Mizer. The orange home shirt featured a depiction of the Cleveland skyline. The black away shirt featured an orange chevron across the chest, with the shape of the chevron inspired by the shape of the Lake Erie shoreline. These kits, manufactured by Admiral Sportswear, were worn for the first two seasons of the club's existence. Ahead of the 2020 season, Cleveland switched manufacturers to UN1TUS, a local company headquartered in Westlake, Ohio. The new orange kit kept the same design, while the away kit was replaced by a white shirt featuring a much larger chevron, although it kept the Art Deco detailing inspired by the pattern on the Guardians statues. After two years, Cleveland SC unveiled new kits ahead of the 2022 season. White was worn at home, with black returning as the away shirt. Both jerseys, paired with orange shorts and socks, featured the statue from the logo in a detail on the right side of the shirt.

== Stadium ==
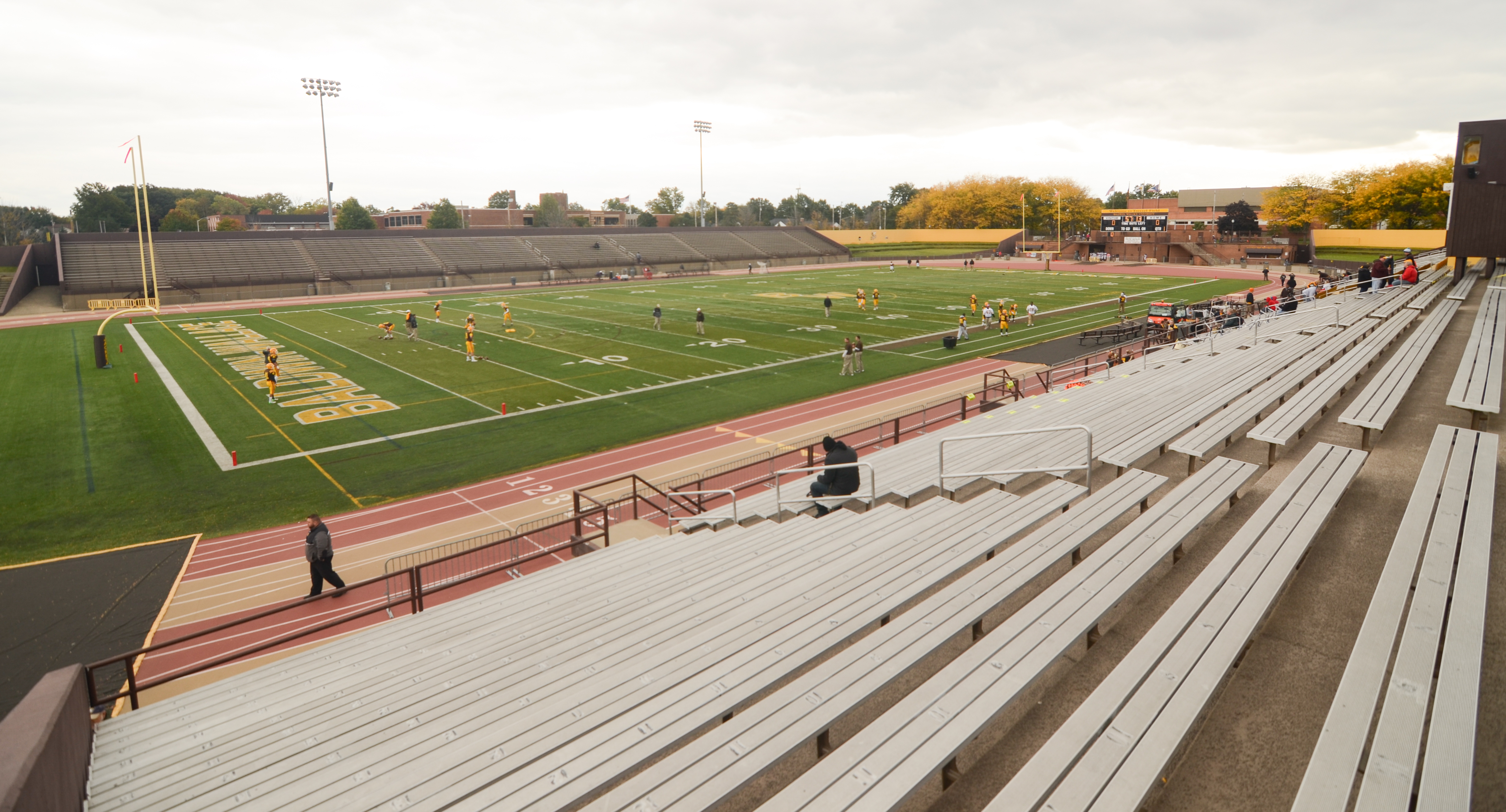
Cleveland SC played its first-ever U.S. Open Cup match at George Finnie Stadium

Cleveland SC hosted its first round match in the 2023 U.S. Open Cup at Drive Morris Stadium in North Olmsted, Ohio. The stadium, which was built in 2018, has a capacity of 4,000. North Olmsted High School, the primary tenants of the stadium, play football, soccer, and track and field at Drive Morris.

=== Previous venues ===
Cleveland SC played its inaugural season at Don Shula Stadium, located in University Heights, Ohio on the campus of John Carroll University. The head coach of the Blue Streaks men's soccer program at the time, Hector Marinaro, helped secure the stadium availability for CSC. On May 19, 2018, in the first competitive game in club history, Cleveland defeated Rochester Lancers by a 2–0 scoreline at Shula. Cleveland finished with four wins, one loss, and one tie at Shula Stadium, while averaging 200 to 300 fans per game.

Due to renovation work at Shula Stadium over the summer of 2019, Cleveland SC moved to Baldwin Wallace University's George Finnie Stadium, located in Berea, Ohio. The debut match at the stadium was on May 5, an international friendly against Mexican side Monarcas Morelia Reserves as part of the Neighbor Nations Showdown. CSC returned to the stadium ahead of the 2021 season and spent two more years in Berea, losing just three total home games across those three seasons. Cleveland SC hosted two NPSL playoff games at the George Finnie in 2021, as well as the club's U.S. Open Cup debut, a first round victory against Chicago FC United in March 2022.

In between stints at the George Finnie, Cleveland SC announced ahead of the 2020 season that they would play home matches at two stadiums that year: Lakewood Stadium, in Lakewood, Ohio, and Krenzler Field, on the campus of Cleveland State University. However, the NPSL season was canceled due to the COVID-19 pandemic, and CSC did not play a home game in the two cup competitions they took part in. The club returned to both stadiums during the 2022 season, playing one regular season game in Lakewood and their Midwest Region quarterfinal at Krenzler.

Cleveland SC has hosted friendly matches at two other stadiums. The first match in club history, against FC Columbus in 2018, was played at Highland Stadium in Medina, Ohio, and a game against Ambassadors FC Ohio in 2021 was held at Sparky DiBiasio Stadium in Euclid, Ohio.

Cleveland SC home stadiums
| Stadium | Location | Capacity | Years |
|---|---|---|---|
| Don Shula Stadium | University Heights, Ohio | 5,416 | 2018 |
| George Finnie Stadium | Berea, Ohio | 7,800 | 2019; 2021–present |
| Krenzler Field | Cleveland, Ohio | 1,680 | 2019 (one game); 2020; 2022 (one game) |
| Lakewood Stadium | Lakewood, Ohio | 10,000 | 2020; 2022 (one game) |
| Drive Morris Stadium | North Olmsted, Ohio | 4,000 | 2023–2024; 2025 (one game) |

== Supporters ==
"All of us are really different, but it does not matter. If you support Cleveland soccer, we are happy to have you...You don't find your club; your club finds you. I'm here for anything NPSL. It is much more intimate here."

— RJ Pooch, one of the leaders of 6th City Syndicate

The organized supporters' group for Cleveland SC is the 6th City Syndicate (6CS). 6CS is an independent group that predates the founding of the club: they previously supported AFC Cleveland before coming along after the creation of Cleveland SC. During matches, 6CS hangs painted banners, sings songs and chants, and lets off smoke after every Cleveland goal.

6CS has declared itself to be "against racism, sexism, homophobia, religious intolerance...bigotry of any kind, violence, and the threat of violence real or perceived." The group has participated in the yearly Prideraiser campaign, raising money for the LGBT Community Center of Greater Cleveland.

== Players and staff ==
=== Squad ===
As of March 20, 2023

Note: Flags indicate national team as defined under FIFA eligibility rules; some limited exceptions apply. Players may hold more than one non-FIFA nationality.

| No. | Pos. | Nation | Player |
|---|---|---|---|
| — | GK | BRA | Pedro Alves |
| — | FW | USA | Tom Beck |
| — | FW | USA | Vinny Bell |
| — | FW | USA | Chris Brennan |
| — | GK | ENG | Conor Cable |
| — | DF | USA | Boban Cancar |
| — | MF | USA | Parker Csiszar |
| — | DF | USA | Chris Cvecko |
| — | MF | USA | Mike Derezic |
| — | FW | USA | Nicholas Felician |
| — | MF | USA | Skye Harter |

| No. | Pos. | Nation | Player |
|---|---|---|---|
| — | DF | USA | Conner Hollett |
| — | DF | USA | Ben Hryszko |
| — | MF | USA | Petar Janjetovic |
| — | MF | USA | Dan Koniarczyk |
| — | FW | USA | Andrew Nicholas |
| — | GK | USA | Connor Robinson |
| — | DF | ITA | Alexandru Rumleanschi |
| — | MF | GER | Jannis Schmidt |
| — | MF | BIH | Admir Suljevic |
| — | MF | SCO | Kieran Toland |
| — | DF | ENG | Josh Wates |

=== Team management ===
Front office
| Owner and president | Samuel Seibert |
Coaching staff
| Head coach | Joe Jovanovski |
| Assistant coach | Reid Ayers; Stephen Trudic |

Last updated: July 24, 2022
Source: 2022 Cleveland SC season

=== Head coach history ===
Ahead of the club's inaugural season, Cleveland SC hired Ryan Osborne as the first head coach in club history. Osborne, a former player for the Charleston Golden Eagles and West Virginia Chaos, also served as an assistant coach for the Notre Dame Falcons during his time in charge of Cleveland. In 2019, Cleveland claimed the East Conference and Midwest Region championships and Osborne was named as the conference coach of the year. He departed after that season to take the head coaching position at Mercyhurst and was replaced by one of his assistant coaches, Lewis Dunne. A former Cleveland SC player, Dunne also served as an assistant at Notre Dame during his time with the club. He led Cleveland to the conference-region title double in 2021, then coached the club during its U.S. Open Cup debut in 2022. Dunne departed following that cup run to take a position as assistant coach and recruiting coordinator at IUPUI.

After Dunne's departure, Cleveland hired Vlad Muresan, the head boys soccer coach at the Hawken School, as his replacement. Muresan, a former player for Ohio Vortex and Akron Summit Assault, led the club to a Rust Belt Conference title and a return to the Open Cup in his first year in charge.

Cleveland SC head coaches
| Name | Nationality | Tenure | Record | | | | |
| Name | Nationality | Tenure | Pld | W | L | T | Win % |
|---|---|---|---|---|---|---|---|
| Ryan Osborne | England | March 13, 2018 – January 16, 2020 | 27 | 17 | 6 | 4 | 62.96 |
| Lewis Dunne | England | January 22, 2020 – April 14, 2022 | 22 | 13 | 5 | 4 | 59.09 |
| Vlad Muresan | Romania | April 27, 2022 – present | 16 | 11 | 4 | 1 | 68.75 |

== Honors ==
Cleveland SC honors
| Honor | No. | Years |
|---|---|---|
| NPSL Midwest Region | 2 | 2019, 2021 |
| NPSL East / Rust Belt Conference | 3 | 2019, 2021, 2022 |

== Club culture ==
=== Broadcasting ===
Cleveland SC streams all home matches online. Vince McKee, the founder of the local KEE On Sports Media Group, has served as the play-by-play commentator for every season of the club's existence, while Cole McDaniel has been the primary color commentator, calling four out of five seasons. For the first three years, Cleveland SC matches were on MyCujoo, the streaming partner of the NPSL; since 2021, they have been viewable on Eleven Sports.

=== Reserve teams ===
In May 2019, Cleveland SC acquired the rights to Rubber City FC, a planned expansion team in the Northern Ohio Soccer League (NOSL). Based in Akron, Ohio, the club had previously attempted to join the NPSL before that move fell through for financial reasons. However, Rubber City never took the field after the 2020 NOSL season was canceled due to the COVID-19 pandemic. The following year, Forest City FC (FCFC) was unveiled as the new reserve side for Cleveland SC, also playing in the NOSL. The team name and crest took homage from the Cleveland Forest Citys, a professional baseball team based in the city in the early 1870s. FCFC played one season, finishing last place in the NOSL in 2021. They won just one of eight games played, although several players made the jump to the CSC first team during the 2021 NISA Independent Cup.

=== Rivalries ===
==== Akron City ====
Since Akron City FC joined the NPSL in 2022, Cleveland SC has had a heated rivalry with their opponents to the south. The derby has been known by many names: the North Coast Cup, the I-77 Bash, the Cuyahoga Valley Derby, the Battle of Northeast Ohio. Separated by less than 50 miles (80 km),

==== CheeseBarn Derby ====
Cleveland SC has a rivalry with fellow Ohioan NPSL club FC Columbus. Both entered the league in 2018 and are separated by less than 150 miles (240 km). The derby is named after Grandpa's Cheesebarn, a landmark business that sits roughly halfway between the two cities on Interstate 71 in Ashland, Ohio. When the clubs were founded, they were placed into different conferences in the NPSL, so the derby began as a series of preseason friendlies: each team claimed a victory in 2018 and they played to a 1–1 draw in 2019. However, beginning with the 2023 season, Cleveland and Columbus were aligned in the Great Lakes Conference.

"...it's also great in any sport when you have a rivalry. Since I started six years ago, sentiment has grown to the point that I hate Erie. The games have gotten bigger and bigger. There have been red cards and fights. It is great for us and the NPSL that there are two teams that care that much about beating one another."

— Former Cleveland SC defender Coletun Long

==== Conference opponents ====
Due to NPSL scheduling, which does not include inter-conference play during the regular season, Cleveland has built up competitive rivalries with Great Lakes Conference opponents Erie Commodores and Steel City FC. The cities of Cleveland and Erie are roughly 100 miles (160 km) apart, while Cleveland to Pittsburgh is about 135 miles (217 km). Games between Cleveland and the Commodores have involved fights and red cards, and the teams have frequently battled at the top of the conference. AFC Cleveland knocked Erie out of the playoffs in 2012, and Cleveland SC did so in 2018. The rivalry with Steel City dates back to each city's previous clubs, AFC Cleveland and Fort Pitt Regiment, and has ties in the Browns–Steelers rivalry and the resulting animosity between the cities. In both 2021 and 2022, Cleveland knocked Pittsburgh out of the playoffs in the Midwest quarterfinals.

==== Rust Belt Derby ====
Cleveland contested the Rust Belt Derby with FC Buffalo and Detroit City FC, a rivalry series that dated back to the AFC Cleveland era. The supporters' groups of the three clubs created and sponsored the rivalry, named after the Rust Belt region in which all of the teams reside. AFC Cleveland claimed the inaugural trophy in 2012, but Detroit won four in a row, before switching conferences in 2016 then moving leagues to the National Independent Soccer Association in 2020. Although the derby was dormant for three years, Cleveland SC continued to face Buffalo in league play and defeated Detroit in the 2019 Midwest Region final. The series resumed in 2020 and 2021, as all three clubs were drawn together in the Great Lakes Region of the NISA Independent Cup. However, the derby has not been played since, as Buffalo moved to USL League Two and Detroit to the USL Championship. Cleveland's 6th City Syndicate and Detroit's Northern Guard Supporters maintain hostile relations, due to the high-profile matches between the clubs and the historical sporting rivalry between the cities of Cleveland and Detroit.

== Year-by-year ==
| Season | League | | | | | | | | | | Position | | Playoffs | USOC | Other | | Top goalscorer(s) | |
| Season | League | Pld | W | L | T | GF | GA | GD | Pts | PPG | Conf. | Overall | Playoffs | USOC | Other | | Name(s) | Goals |
|---|---|---|---|---|---|---|---|---|---|---|---|---|---|---|---|---|---|---|
| 2018 | NPSL | 12 | 7 | 2 | 3 | 34 | 11 | +23 | 24 | 2.0 | 2nd | 21st | Reg.SF | DNE | N/A | | Vinny Bell | 11 |
| 2019 | NPSL | 10 | 8 | 2 | 0 | 29 | 9 | +20 | 24 | 2.4 | 1st | 5th | Nat.SF | DNQ | N/A | | Vinny Bell | 12 |
| 2020 | NPSL | Canceled due to the COVID-19 pandemic | | | | | | | | | | | | NH (Note: Cleveland qualified for the U.S. Open Cup in 2020 and 2021, but the tournament was canceled both years due to the COVID-19 pandemic.) | NPSL Members Cup NISA Independent Cup | 2nd, Rust Belt 2nd, Great Lakes | Five players (Note: Vinny Bell, Coletun Long, Antonio Manfut, Paolo Termine, and Szabolcs Wiksell) | 1 |
| 2021 | NPSL | 10 | 8 | 0 | 2 | 25 | 9 | +16 | 26 | 2.6 | 1st | 6th | Nat.SF | NH | NISA Independent Cup | 3rd, Great Lakes | Vinny Bell | 7 |
| 2022 | NPSL | 12 | 8 | 3 | 1 | 33 | 14 | +19 | 25 | 2.08 | 1st | 25th | Reg.F | R2 | N/A | | Vinny Bell | 8 |
| 2023 | NPSL | 12 | 6 | 4 | 2 | 22 | 15 | +7 | 20 | 1.67 | 3rd | 37th | Con.F | R2 | N/A | | | |
| 2024 | NPSL | 10 | 5 | 4 | 1 | 27 | 19 | +8 | 16 | 1.60 | 5th | 40th | DNQ | DNQ | N/A | | Stanislav Koval | 10 |
| 2025 | NPSL | 10 | 5 | 3 | 2 | 20 | 18 | +2 | 17 | 1.70 | 5th | 30th | DNQ | DNQ | N/A | | Nicolas Vagujhelyi | 5 |
| 2026 | NPSL | 12 | 7 | 1 | 4 | 16 | 15 | +11 | 22 | 1.83 | 3rd | 18th | Conf SF | 2Q | N/A | | | |

Cleveland SC has a record of five wins, one loss, and one tie in friendly matches. That record includes one international friendly, a victory against Mexican side Monarcas Morelia Reserves in 2019 as part of the Neighbor Nations Showdown.

== See also ==
- Cleveland City Stars (2006–2009) – previous professional soccer club in Cleveland
- Cleveland Crunch – indoor soccer club, member of Major League Indoor Soccer
- Cleveland Pro Soccer – upcoming MLS Next Pro club set to play in 2025
- List of Cleveland sports teams
- List of National Premier Soccer League teams
- Sports in Cleveland
