= Don Shula Stadium =

Stadium in University Heights, Ohio

- Interactive map of Don Shula Stadium
- Former names: Wasmer Field
- Address: 1 John Carroll Boulevard, University Heights, Ohio; United States
- Coordinates: 41°29′25″N 81°31′31″W
- Owner: John Carroll University
- Operator: JCU Athletics
- Capacity: 5,416
- Type: Stadium
- Surface: ProGrass artificial turf
- Current use: Football; Soccer; Lacrosse

Construction
- Opened: 2003; 23 years ago

Tenants
- College teams: John Carroll Blue Streaks (NCAA) football, soccer, lacrosse Professional teams: Cleveland SC (NPSL) (2018)

Website
- jcusports.com/don-shula-stadium

Don Shula Stadium is a stadium located on the campus of John Carroll University in University Heights, Ohio, near Cleveland. Don Shula Stadium is home to the Division III Blue Streaks of John Carroll University and has an official capacity of 5,416 spectators. It also serves as a home for the school's soccer and lacrosse programs.

The stadium is named for Pro Football Hall of Fame coach and former NFL player, Don Shula, a cornerback for the Blue Streaks in the late 1940s and was drafted in the ninth round of the 1951 NFL draft.

== History ==
Don Shula Stadium was built around the preexisting "Wasmer Field", which has been the home turf for the JCU Blue Streaks since 1968. The venue was opened in 2003 with the official dedication and opening event held on September 27 of that year in a football game between the John Carroll Blue Streaks and the Polar Bears of Ohio Northern University.

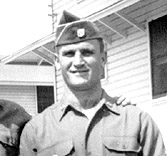
The stadium was named after Don Shula (pictured)

The stadium was named in honor of Don Shula, an alumnus of John Carroll University and a retired Pro Football Hall of Fame coach in the National Football League. Shula was the defensive coordinator for the Detroit Lions for the 1960–1962 seasons. He was also the head coach for both the Baltimore Colts (1963–1969) and the Miami Dolphins (1970–1995). In his 32 seasons as a head coach, Shula won fourteen Division titles, five AFC Championships, two Super Bowls (VII, VIII) and the 1968 NFL Championship. He holds several NFL records including the record for most NFL regular season wins (328) and the Miami Dolphins' record for most career wins (257).

The completion of Don Shula Stadium added new locker rooms and coaches' offices to the complex. It also replaced the old weight room with a new, state-of-the-art version and added an updated training room. A new press box and coaches booths were also added.
