= Akron City FC =

- Full name: Akron City Football Club
- Founded: 2021; 5 years ago
- Stadium: InfoCision Stadium-Summa Field; The University of Akron; Akron, Ohio
- Capacity: 3,000
- Head Coach: Andy Hoggarth
- League: USL League Two
- Website: akroncityfc.com
Home colors	Away colors

Akron City Football Club is an American soccer club based in Akron, Ohio, United States.

Founded in 2021, the men's team plays in USL League Two, a pre-professional league that is part of the United Soccer League system. The team originally played in the National Premier Soccer League (NPSL), a national semi-pro league at the fourth tier of the American Soccer Pyramid, in the Great Lakes Conference of the Midwest Region. The team plays its home games at Green Street Stadium on the campus of St. Vincent–St. Mary High School in Akron. The team's colors are sky blue, red and white.

== History ==
=== Club History ===
The club was launched on September 16, 2021, when seasoned sports business executive, Nick Turchan, fronted an ownership group to bring minor league soccer to Akron. While previous efforts by other ownership groups to establish a sustainable soccer club in the city had been unsuccessful, Turchan oversaw the formation of Akron City FC with a focus on long-term stability and community integration. The club was established with the goal of building a durable organization that would become a permanent part of Akron’s sports landscape.

Akron City FC joined the NPSL as an expansion franchise in 2021 and took part in its first competitive season in 2022. Kia Zolgharnain was named as the technical director and was responsible for player acquisition for the new team. Akron City played their first NPSL game on May 14, 2022. In front of 1,051 fans, the team secured a 2–1 victory over Pittsburgh Hotspurs.

The team would not win again until its final game on July 15, 2022 against the Erie Commodores. Kia stepped down as head coach after three games for medical reasons and assistant coach Jay Stepp assumed head coaching duties for the reaming of the season. Cedric Tschami was elevated to top assistant. Despite the team's final record, four of their losses were by one goal and they played to four draws. One of those draws was against eventual Rust Belt champion and Midwest Region finalist Cleveland SC, avenging their two worst losses of the season. In that game, Akron City FC scored early and held a 1-0 lead for over 70 minutes before conceding the equalizer in the 86th minute.

Despite the results on the field, the 2022 season was a great building block for the future. The team drew over 1,000 fans twice and averaged 625 fans for the season, well above league averages. The team secured 19 sponsorships, proving the business community was on board with the cities newest sports asset.

In December 2024, Akron announced it was joining USL League Two for the 2025 season.

Akron City FC completed its inaugural USL League Two season with a record of 5 wins, 5 draws, and 2 losses, finishing third in its division. Despite competing against more established clubs, the team posted a strong overall performance and remained in contention throughout the season, widely viewed as a successful debut campaign at the USL League Two level. The club also set a single-match attendance record, drawing more than 1,700 fans for a home match against Cleveland Force SC, reflecting growing community support and increased interest following the move to USL League Two.

== Club colors and crest ==
=== Sponsorship ===
Period	Kit manufacturer	Shirt Sponsor	Sleeve Sponsor	Other Kit Sponsors
2022	UN1TUS	Hoppin' Frog Brewery	Springside Athletic Club	Circle K, Cleveland Clinic Akron General
2023	UN1TUS	Hoppin' Frog Brewery	Circle K	Cleveland Clinic Akron General, Sgt. Clean Car Wash, TL Worldwide Transportation
2024	ARRIVO (formerly Un1tus)	Uncle Tito's Mexican Grill	Circle K	Hoppin' Frog Brewery, Sgt. Clean Car Wash, Days of Gifts, Lyndall Insurance, Ohio Euro Motorcars, Sports Alliance of Greater Akron
2025	ARRIVO (formerly Un1tus)	Uncle Tito's Mexican Grill	Circle K	Hoppin' Frog Brewery, Akron Indoor Soccer, Lyndall Insurance, Days of Gifts, Ohio Euro Motors

== Players and staff ==
=== Current roster ===
Note: Flags indicate national team as defined under FIFA eligibility rules; some limited exceptions apply. Players may hold more than one non-FIFA nationality.

No.	Pos.	Nation	Player
1	GK	USA	Brett Kaminski
2	DF	CAN	Jami Royer
3	MF	SRB	Uros Jevtic
4	DF	ENG	Mikey Lennon
5	DF	NED	Stan Klaver
6	MF	ENG	Matt Roberts
7	FW	USA	Marko Rimac
8	MF	USA	Marko Odorcic
9	MF	USA	Wan Kuzri Wan Kamal
10	MF	USA	Ethan Vermillion
11	DF	SRB	Milos Stajkovic
12	FW	USA	Carter Hancock
13	FW	CAN	Remi Agunbiade

No.	Pos.	Nation	Player
15	DF	USA	Adam Kalvitz
16	MF	USA	Glory User
17	DF	USA	Quinn Groves
18	FW	USA	Stefan Dobrijevic
19	MF	USA	Lazar Ivanis
20	DF	USA	Will Wagner
21	FW	CAN	Abdi Bah
22	MF	GER	Jannis Schmidt
23	MF	USA	Colin Biros
24	DF	USA	James Buebendorf
25	FW	USA	Dylan Halm
31	GK	USA	Cam Victor

== Year-by-year ==
Season	League													Playoffs	Open Cup	Top Goalscorer(s)	
Season	Div	League	Conference	Pld	W	L	D	GF	GA	GD	Pts	PPG	Position	Playoffs	Open Cup	Name(s)	Goals
2022	4	NPSL	Rust Belt Conference	12	2	6	4	10	23	-13	10	0.83	5th	DNQ	DNE	(United States) Jaden Wright	5
2023	4	NPSL	Great Lakes Conference	12	3	8	1	15	20	-5	10	0.83	6th	DNQ	DNE	(United States) Jaden Wright	3
2024	4	NPSL	Great Lakes Conference	10	8	2	0	43	10	+33	24	2.40	2nd	Great Lakes Conference playoffs	DNE	(United States) Stefan Dobrijevic	12
2025	4	USL2	Great Forest Division	12	5	2	5	19	11	+8	20	1.67	3rd	DNQ	DNE	(United States) Stefan Dobrijevic	4
2026	4	USL2	Great Forest Division	12	6	5	1	23	18	+5	20	1.67	4th	DNQ	3rd Qualifying Round		

== Managerial history ==
Coach	Years	League W-L-D	Playoffs	
Kia Zolgharnain/Jay Stepp Andy Hoggarth Neso Ivanis	2022–2022 2023–2026 2026-Present	2–6–4 17-13-6	0-0-0 1-1	Total

== Stadium ==
- Green Street Stadium, St. Vincent–St. Mary High School;Akron, Ohio (2022–present)
