= Sunflower State FC =

Sunflower State
- Full name: Sunflower State Football Club
- Founded: 2020; 6 years ago
- Stadium: The Pembroke Hill School
- Owners: Joey Lipoff; Andrew Lentell; Salvatore Sesti; Charles Salazar; Nick McDonald
- Head Coaches: Men's Coach: Nick McDonald; Women's Coach: Jose Ramos
- League: USL2; WPSL
- 2025: Men's Great Plains: 3rd Women's Heartland: 3rd
- Website: sunflowerstatefc.com
Home colors	Away colors	Third colors

Sunflower State FC is a men's and women's semi-professional soccer team based in Overland Park, Kansas whose men's team competes in the USL League Two as a member of the Great Plains Division and whose women's team competes in the Women's Premier Soccer League as a member of the Heartland Division.

The club was originally founded in Kansas City, Kansas in 2020 and competed in the United Premier Soccer League and the Major Arena Soccer League 3. The club eventually merged with Ozark FC in 2022, taking its place in the NPSL.

The team colors are yellow, black, and white.

== History ==
Originally the founding members began playing in Kansas City adult leagues as Queso Blanco. Over the first two years competing in the most competitive amateur adult leagues and tournaments in the area the club found substantial success, winning 10 first and second place trophies. Throughout the years interest in the team began to grow. This led to the development and transition to Sunflower State FC and beginning semi-pro competition in the MASL 3 and UPSL in 2020-2021.

The clubs first season saw them competing in the Midwest South conference in the United Premier Soccer League. They finished their season with a 3-2-3 record finishing in 3rd place with 11 points.

On January 10, 2022, the NPSL announced that Ozark FC had come to an agreement with Sunflower State FC to merge clubs, relocate to Kansas City, Kansas, and keep the club name of Sunflower State FC.

In early 2022 the club announced that it would be starting a women's team. The team was to be coach by Jose Ramos who had previously played with the men's team in the Major Arena Soccer League 3. The club played their first season in the UWS League 2 Central Conference winning the conference title with a record of 4-1-1.

In the club's debut season in the NPSL they moved their home field to Rockhurst University and played in the Heartland Conference finishing the regular season with a 5-4-3 record finishing in 3rd place with 18 points and qualifying for the playoffs for the first time in their history. They were knocked out of the playoffs in the first round losing 4-2 against OKC 1889 FC.

On January 11, 2023 it was announced that Sunflower State FC's women's team would be joining the Women's Premier Soccer League (WPSL) for the 2023 season.

For the men's 2023 season, Sunflower State was moved to the Gateway Conference. They finished their season with a record of 4-5-1 finishing in 3rd place with 13 points and missing out on the playoffs.

The women's debut season in the WPSL saw them competing in the Central Heartland Division. They finished the season with a record of 3-1-6 coming in 4th place with 10 points.

For the club's men's 2024 season they once again competed in the Gateway Conference. This season saw the beginning of the short lived KC derby between Sunflower State and the KC Sol who had joined the conference for this season. Sunflower State finished the season with a record of 3-4-3 coming in 5th in their conference with 12 points and missing out on the playoffs by one position.

The women's 2024 season saw Sunflower State finish with a record of 4-3-3 coming in 4th place with 15 points.

On November 25, 2024 it was announced that the club's men's team would be joining the USL League Two. The club will also be playing their home games at The Pembroke Hill School.

== Staff ==
Position	Staff
President	Joey Lipoff
Vice President	Salvatore Sesti
Finance Director	Charles Salazar
Business Development Director	Max Roberts
Men's Head Coach	Nick McDonald
Women's Head Coach	Jose Ramos
Head of Gameday Media	Chris Guldenpfennig
Social Media / Marketing Coordinator	Josh Walker

Last updated: June 4th, 2026

== Men's Seasons ==
Season	Domestic League											U.S. Open Cup	CONCACAF CL	Average Attendance
Season	League	GP	W	L	D	GF	GA	Pts	Conference	Pos.	Playoffs	U.S. Open Cup	CONCACAF CL	Average Attendance
2017	NPSL	10	2	8	0	12	36	6	Heartland Conference	6th	Did not qualify	Did not qualify	Did not qualify	50
2018	NPSL	10	0	9	1	4	19	1	Heartland Conference	6th	Did not qualify	Did not qualify	Did not qualify	400
2019	NPSL	11	3	5	3	18	24	12	Heartland Conference	4th	vs Tulsa	Did not qualify	Did not qualify	400
2022	NPSL	12	5	4	3	19	20	18	Heartland Conference	3rd	vs OKC 1889 FC	Did not qualify	Did not qualify	100
2023	NPSL	10	4	5	1	21	22	13	Gateway Conference	3rd	Did not qualify	Did not qualify	Did not qualify	100
2024	NPSL	10	3	4	3	23	16	12	Gateway Conference	5th	Did not qualify	Did not qualify	Did not qualify	100
2025	USL 2	12	4	2	6	22	27	14	Great Plains Division	3rd	Did not qualify	Did not qualify	Did not qualify	100
2026	USL 2	12	4	0	8	17	31	12	Great Plains Division	3th	Did not qualify	Did not qualify	Did not qualify	

== Current Men's Roster ==
Note: Flags indicate national team as defined under FIFA eligibility rules; some limited exceptions apply. Players may hold more than one non-FIFA nationality.

No.	Pos.	Nation	Player
—	GK	USA	Noah Reuscher
—	GK	USA	Charlie Duske
—	DF	USA	Brady Robins
—	DF	USA	Bryson Gosch (captain)
—	DF	USA	Carter Santa
—	DF	USA	Charlie-Finn Barrett
—	DF	USA	Wesley Cribb
—	DF	USA	Cameron Ayoade
—	DF	USA	Tanner Hollenbeck
—	MF	USA	Coby Jones
—	DF	USA	Sam DeLong
—	DF	USA	Will Hunter
—	MF	BRA	Augusto Militão
—	MF	USA	Barrett Kitts

No.	Pos.	Nation	Player
—	MF	USA	Braden Yows
—	MF	USA	Kael Drummond
—	MF	USA	Edgar Bazan
—	MF	USA	Dylan Willingham
—	MF	USA	Liam Dean
—	FW	USA	TY Jacob Sisler
—	FW	IRQ	Khudhur Abdulameer
—	FW	USA	Geremi Onentia
—	FW	USA	Jack Lucas
—	FW	USA	Dalton Visconti
—	FW	USA	Immanuel Wayoro
—	FW	USA	Crew Alvarez
—	FW	ARM	Dylan Mirakian

== Current Women's Roster ==
Note: Flags indicate national team as defined under FIFA eligibility rules; some limited exceptions apply. Players may hold more than one non-FIFA nationality.

No.	Pos.	Nation	Player
—	GK	AUT	Fiona Popetschnig
—	GK	USA	Hannah McFarlane
—	GK	USA	Avery Young
—	DF	SWE	Lillja Lidstrom
—	DF	USA	Ann Hope (Captain)
—	DF	JPN	Momoka Kinoshita
—	DF	ARG	Emilia Zolesio
—	DF	USA	Megan Watson
—	DF	USA	Gracie Fitzgerald
—	DF	USA	Achaia Day
—	DF	USA	Maddie Lalman
—	MF	BRA	Thayline Teixeira
—	MF	USA	Megan Snyder
—	MF	USA	Alexis Mitchell

No.	Pos.	Nation	Player
—	MF	USA	Jules Wardlaw
—	FW	USA	Natalie Jones
—	FW	ENG	Luna Etienne
—	FW	MEX	Adrianna Lara
—	FW	ARG	Delfina Zolesio
—	FW	USA	Brecklyn Hardman
—	FW	USA	Charlotte Woodward
—	FW	USA	Genevieve Hull
—	FW	USA	Allie Workman
—	FW	USA	Ximena Arnau
—	FW	COL	Laura Torres
—	FW	JPN	Kanon Ozaki
—	FW	MEX	Sara Cortes
