= Northern Virginia United FC =

- Nickname: NVU
- Founded: January 3, 2018
- Stadium: Cropp Metcalfe Park at Evergreen Sportsplex
- Capacity: 1300
- Owner: Brian Welsh
- Head Coach: Brian Welsh
- League: NPSL
- Website: https://www.nvufc.com/

Northern Virginia United FC was an American soccer club based in Leesburg, Virginia. They used to have teams in the fourth-tier National Premier Soccer League and fifth-tier United Premier Soccer League.

The club's primary nickname is 'NVU' and the name used across all of their social media platforms is 'NVUFC'. The club used to play their home matches at Cropp Metcalfe Park at Evergreen Sportsplex.

== History ==
Northern Virginia United FC was founded in 2018 by Brian Welsh and Chris Jennings. They joined the fourth-tier National Premier Soccer League and playing out of Evergreen Sportsplex in Leesburg, Virginia. Their original crest reflected the area's aviation history and status as an Internet hub. However, the crest eventually change to include a lion, a homage to Brian Welsh's former club in Scotland, Dundee United. They played their first match on June 1, 2018, defeating FC Frederick by a score of 2–1.

In 2019, the Northern Virginia United Youth Academy was formed. The academy joined the Super Y League in 2021.

In 2020, they added a club in the fifth-tier United Premier Soccer League, while continuing to operate their NPSL side. However, their debut in the UPSL was delayed as they were unable to compete in 2020 due to the COVID-19 pandemic.

In March 2021, NVUFC announced a partnership with Scottish Premiership club Dundee United F.C. The partnership's formation was due in part due to Brian Welsh, the owner and manager of NVUFC, being a former longtime player for Dundee United. The partnership will allow for the sharing of resources, with players and coaches being able to travel for training experiences between the two clubs. As part of the partnership, NVUFC rebranded their logo to align with the Dundee United crest, adopting the tangerine color and logo brand assets. current status is unknown as they weren't announced for the upcoming NPSL Mid Atlantic division 2024 season.

== Club management ==
Front Office

| Position | Staff |
|---|---|
| Owner | Brian Welsh |
| General Manager | Chris Welsh |
| Director of Soccer Operations | Chris Jennings |
| Director of Operations | Daniel Welsh |

Last updated: January 11, 2018
Source: Official Website of Northern Virginia United

Coaching staff

| Position | Staff |
|---|---|
| Head Coach | (Scotland) Brian Welsh |
| Assistant Coach | (United States) Chris Jennings |
| Assistant Coach | (Scotland) Daniel Welsh |
| Assistant Coach | (Scotland) Michael Welsh |
| Player Coach | (Scotland) Chris Welsh |

Last updated: January 2018
Source: Official Website of Northern Virginia United
