= Jaro Zawislan =

Polish football player and coach (1971–2026)

Personal information
- Full name: Jarosław J. Zawiślan
- Date of birth: 1971
- Place of birth: Poland
- Date of death: January 9, 2026 (aged 55)
- Position: Goalkeeper

College career
Years	Team	Apps	(Gls)
1990–1993	Clemson Tigers		

Senior career*
Years	Team	Apps	(Gls)
1994	Columbia Heat		
1995	Arka Gdynia		
1996	Detroit Neon (indoor)	18	(0)
1996–1997	Toronto Shooting Stars (indoor)	1	(0)
2000	Atlanta Silverbacks	1	(0)

Managerial career
- 1999–2000: Creighton Bluejays (assistant)
- 2001–2002: Stanford Cardinal (assistant)
- 2002–2009: Syracuse Orange (assistant)
- 2009–2015: Cornell Big Red
- 2022–2025: Le Moyne Dolphins (women)
- * Club domestic league appearances and goals

Jarosław J. Zawiślan (1971 – January 9, 2026) was a Polish college soccer coach. He played professionally as a goalkeeper in the USISL, Continental Indoor Soccer League and Polish Second Division.

== Playing career ==
Zawislan attended Clemson University, where he played on the men's soccer team from 1990 to 1993. In his 88 games with the Tigers, he made 446 saves and was the 1993 Atlantic Coast Conference tournament MVP. He earned his bachelor's degree in computer science from Clemson in 1993 and bachelor's degree in education from the University of Toronto in 1999. In 1994, Zawislan played for the Columbia Heat in the USISL, being named an Atlantic Division All Star. In January 1995, the Toronto Shooting Stars selected Zawislan in the National Professional Soccer League draft. He chose not to sign with Toronto but play in the Poland II Liga with Arka Gdynia. In 1996, he returned to the United States where he signed with the Detroit Neon of the Continental Indoor Soccer League. In the fall of 1996, he finally signed with the Toronto Shooting Stars, playing one game in November 1996 in place of injured starter Paolo Ceccarelli. In 2000, Zawislan played one game for the Atlanta Silverbacks in the 2000 A-League.

== Coaching career ==
Zawislan held numerous coaching positions. In 1999, Zawislan was hired by Creighton University as an assistant coach with the men's soccer team. When Creighton head coach, Bret Simon moved to Stanford University, Zawislan followed him in February 2001. In 2002, he moved to Syracuse University where he served as an assistant coach. In April 2009, Cornell University signed Zawislan as head coach of the men's soccer team. In January 2016, Zawislan left the program at Cornell and was replaced by former Stanford assistant coach John Smith.

On November 17, 2025, it was announced Zawislan would not return as Le Moyne coach.

== Death ==
Zawislan died on January 9, 2026, at the age of 55.
