= North Alabama SC =

- Full name: North Alabama Soccer Coalition
- Founded: 2008
- Stadium: John Hunt Park Championship Soccer Stadium
- League: National Premier Soccer League; USL League Two
- Website: http://northalabamasc.org/
Home colours

North Alabama Soccer Coalition is an American soccer team based in Huntsville, Alabama. The team is a member of the National Premier Soccer League (NPSL), the fourth tier of the American Soccer Pyramid, and plays in the Southeast Conference. The NPSL is officially affiliated to the United States Adult Soccer Association (USASA) and qualifies for the U.S. Open Cup. It is generally considered to be the level of competition behind Major League Soccer (MLS), the USL Championship, USL League One, and roughly equal with USL League Two.

== History ==
Before forming together into 2008 North Alabama SC was originally two separate entities; the Alabama: KICKS Futbol Club and Huntsville Soccer Club (formed in 1999). The club was formed as a club that allowed for recreational, independent, nonprofit organization that provided for boy and girl youth groups. After the merger, it grew the total number of players to over 600 and allowed for all skills levels and ages to come and compete.

=== Joining the National Premier Soccer League ===
In 2019, North Alabama officially launched their first Women's Premier Soccer League team and then in 2020, they rebranded from the Huntsville Futbol Club to North Alabama SC to represent their community.

Since their creation, North Alabama SC has won over 50 Alabama State Championships, made over 100 Final Four appearances, and produced several Regional ODP players.
