= FC Brownsville =

- Full name: Football Club Brownsville
- Founded: 2015; 11 years ago
- Stadium: Brownsville Sports Park
- Capacity: 5,000
- Owner: Francisco Chavez
- Head Coach
- League: UPSL, NPSL, NISA, & ASL
- Website: fcbrownsville.com
Home colours

FC Brownsville (FCB) is an American soccer team based in Brownsville, Texas, United States. Founded in 2015, FC Brownsville plays in the Lone Star Conference within the National Premier Soccer League and the Texas Central Conference within the United Premier Soccer League. The team uses the Brownsville Sports Park as their home field.

== History ==
FC Brownsville was founded in 2015 and played its first season within the NPSL in 2018. The team went on a hiatus until 2020, to which they still play games today. In 2023, FC Brownsville won the NPSL Lone Star Conference Championship, defeating #1 seed Lubbock Matadors SC 1–0. In the same year, FC Brownsville joined the National Independent Soccer Association within the Texas Conference. In 2024, FC Brownsville joined the United Premier Soccer League in the Texas Central division.

== United Premier Soccer League ==
Joining in 2024, FC Brownsville is placed within the Texas Central Conference as a Division 1 team. FC Brownsville's' first game, as a member of the league, was a 3-0 Victory against SGA hosted at the Parkway Bible Church venue.

=== Coaching staff ===
Position	Name
Head coach	Carlos Portales
Assistant Coach	Jonathan Robledo
Physiotherapist	Jetro Yado Morales

== National Premier Soccer League ==
Joining in 2018 as an Expansion team, FC Brownsville placed 5th out of 9 teams in the Lone Star Conference, earning a spot in the Lone Star Conference Quarterfinal. Shortly after the 2018 season, FC Brownsville went on a one-year hiatus and returned to the NPSL in 2020. In the year 2023, FC Brownsville won the Lone Star Conference Playoffs defeating West Texas FC in the Semi-Finals 2–1, and defeating Lubbock Matadors SC 1–0 in the Finals, which ended in extra time. FC Brownsville advanced to the South Region Semifinals, to which they lost 2–0 against Southern States SC

=== Coaching staff ===
Position	Name
Head coach	Jonathan Robledo
Assistant Coach	Carlos Portales
Physiotherapist	Jetro Yado Morales

=== Year-by-year ===
Year	Regular season	W-D-L	Playoffs
2018	5th, Lone Star Conference	4-0-6	Conference Quarterfinals
2019	On hiatus		
2020	Cancelled due to COVID-19		
2021	7th, Lone Star Conference	2-2-6	Did Not Qualify
2022	2nd, Lone Star Conference	8-1-3	Conference Quarterfinals
2023	2nd, Lone Star Conference	8-1-2	South Region Semifinals

== National Independent Soccer Association ==
Joining in the Fall of 2023, FC Brownsville won its first season within the NN Texas Division. FC Brownsville led the table with a record of 3 wins, 1 draw, and 0 losses. FC Brownsville also placed 3rd Nationally, losing to NoVa FC 2–1 in the Semi-Finals.

=== Year-by-year ===
Year	Regular season	W-D-L	Playoffs
Fall 2023	1st, NN Texas	3-1-0	National Semi-Finals

== Youth Soccer & American Soccer League Pro ==
FC Brownsville is a team in the Texas South Division within American Soccer League Pro, and on the official FC Brownsville website, FC Brownville states their membership in the ASL as "Development and growth for young players and the opportunity to compete at a tier 3 level."

=== Coaching staff ===
Position	Name
Head coach	Hebert Iracheta
Head coach	Carlos Portales
Physiotherapist	Jetro Yado Morales
