= FC Frederick =

- Full name: Football Club Frederick
- Founded: 1986; 40 years ago
- Stadium: Warner Stadium, Saint John's Catholic Prep
- Capacity: 400
- Head Coach: Rob Ryerson
- League: NPSL
- Website: fcfrederick.com
Home colours	Away colours

Football Club Frederick is a soccer club playing in the Mid-Atlantic Conference of the National Premier Soccer League.

FC Frederick joined the NPSL in 2015 and play their home games at Warner Stadium on the campus of Saint John's Catholic Prep (Maryland) in Buckeystown, Maryland. The team used Urbana High School in Ijamsville, Maryland as a home facility for the 2019 and 2021 seasons, and Thomas Athletic Field on the campus of Hood College in Frederick, Maryland, from 2015-2018.
