= Muskegon Risers =

- Founded: 2014
- Stadium: Kehren Stadium (Outdoor) Muskegon Catholic Central; Mercy Health Arena (Indoor) Muskegon, Michigan
- Head Coach: Stuart Collins (Outdoor Men); Ben Ritsema (Indoor Men); Matt Schmitt (Outdoor Women); Debbie Pekel (Indoor Women); Steven Jones (eSports)
- League: NPSL; Major Arena Soccer League 2 United Women's Soccer; Virtual Pro Gaming
- Website: http://www.muskegonrisers.com
Home colors	Away colors	Third colors

The Muskegon Risers are an American soccer team based in Muskegon, Michigan. The team participates in the National Premier Soccer League for its outdoor season in the summer and Major Arena Soccer League 2 for its indoor season in the winter. Kehren Stadium and Mercy Health Arena are home to the Risers for their outdoor and indoor seasons respectively. Ben Ritsema is the head coach of the Muskegon Risers Men's indoor team, Debbie Pekel is the head coach of the Women's indoor team, and Steven Jones is the head coach of the eSports team. Both head coaching positions for the organization's outdoor teams are currently open.

In April 2019, it was announced that the team will play in the National Premier Soccer League Great Lakes Conference beginning in 2020. On November 2, 2017, the club announced that it would take part in the inaugural season of Major Arena Soccer League 2.

== Origin of the name ==
'Risers' name was inspired by the 'Muskegon, Together Rising' sculpture that stands in the heart of downtown Muskegon.

== Year-by-year ==
Outdoor

Year	Tier	League	Regular season	Playoffs	U.S. Open Cup	Average Attendance
2015	N/A	Independent	10–3–1	N/A	DNQ	
2016	N/A	Independent	5–6–1	N/A	DNQ	
2017	5	PLA	5–2–3	DNQ	DNQ	
2018	5	UPSL	4–3–3	DNQ	DNQ	

Indoor

Year	League	Regular season	Playoffs	Average Attendance
2014–15	Independent	1–0–0	N/A	
2015–16	Independent	0–2–0	N/A	
2016–17	PASL	3rd of 5, Great Lakes Division (3–3–2)	DNQ	
2017–18	MASL2	4th of 5, Eastern Division (3–9)	DNQ	
2018–19	MASL2	5th of 5, Eastern Division (1–11)	DNQ	
2019–20	Independent	3–1	-	
2021	Independent	2–1	-	

== Gallery ==
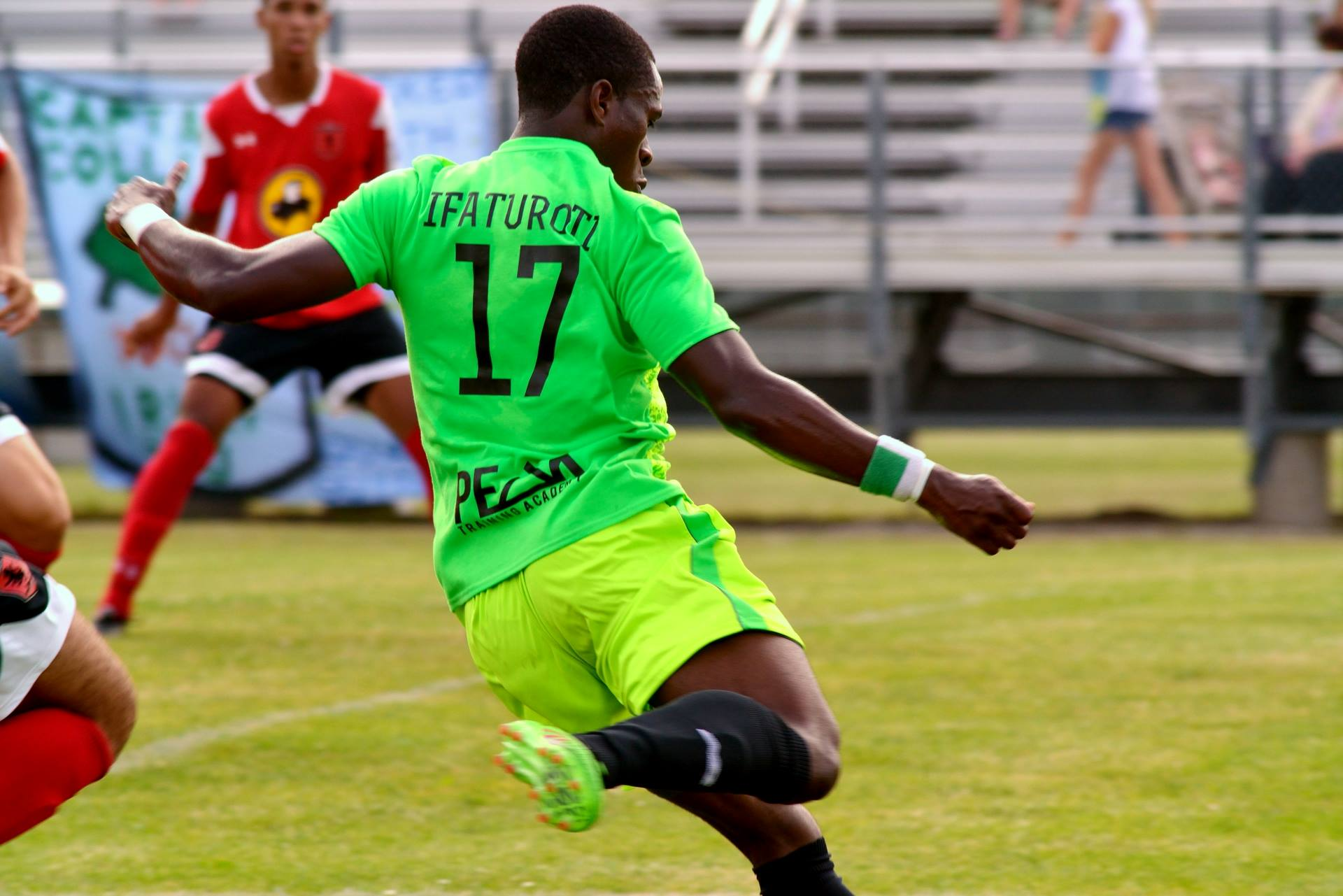
Game Photo

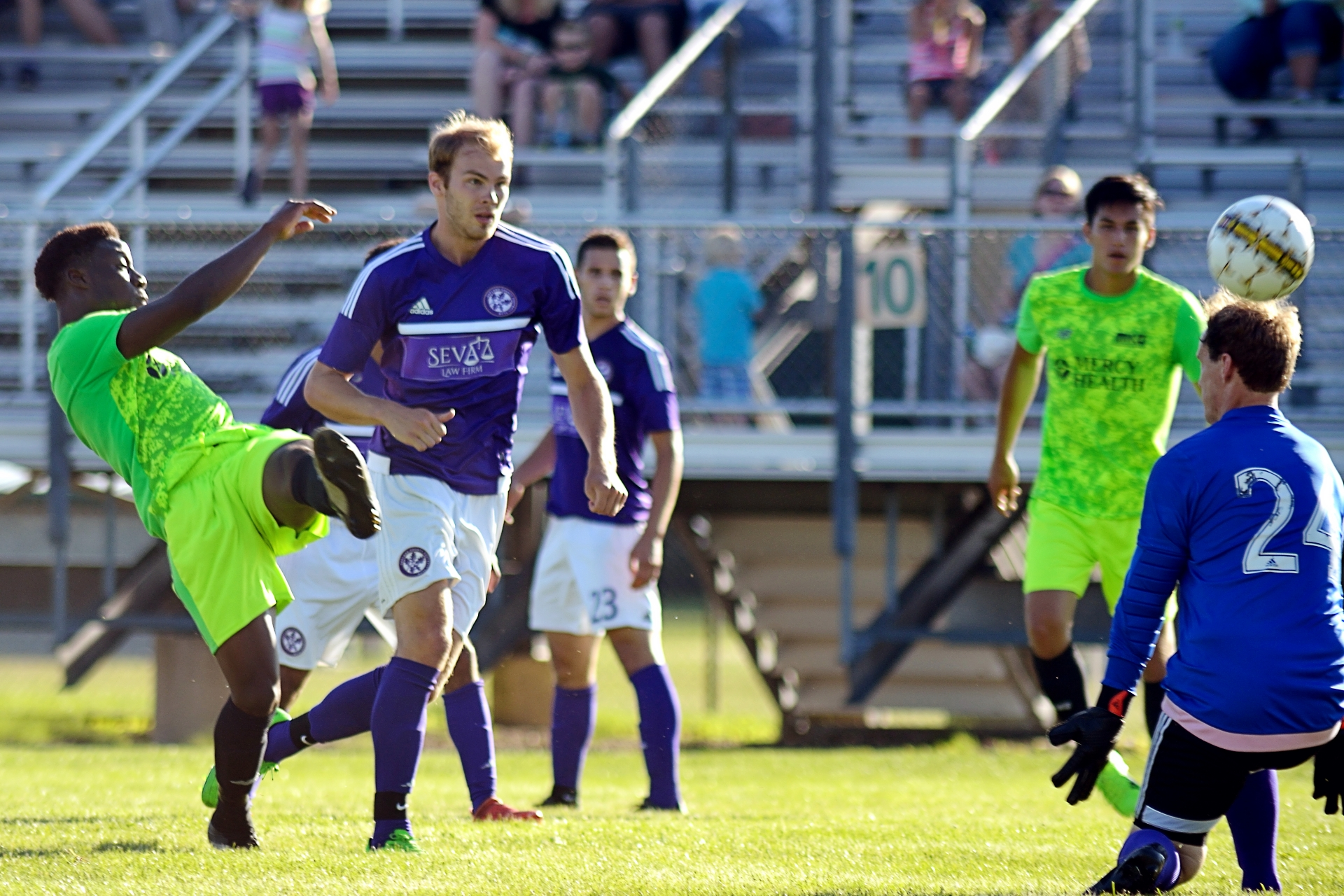
Game Photo

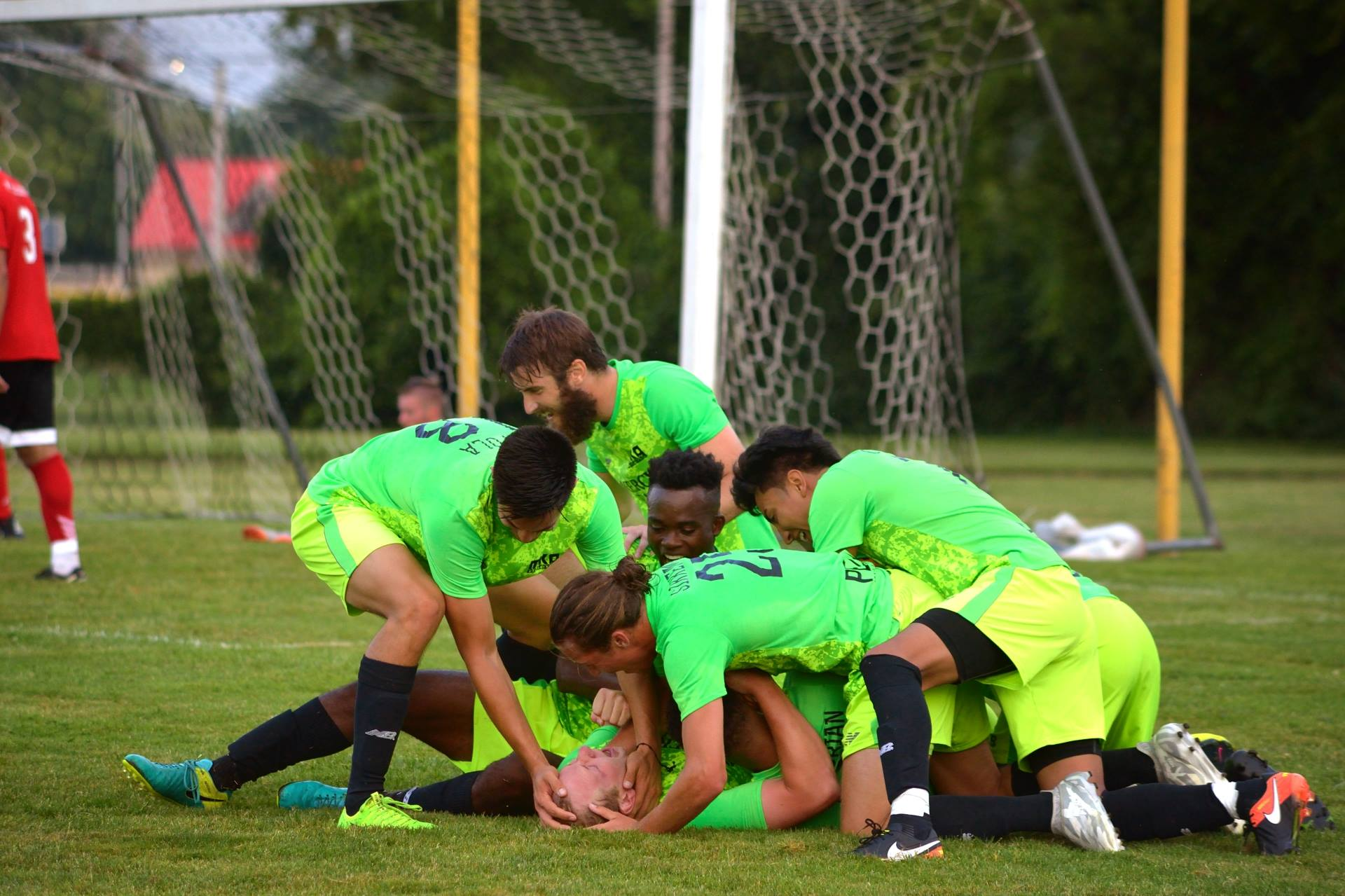
Goal Celebration
