= 2026 The League for Clubs season =

US soccer league season

The League for Clubs
- Season: 2026
- Champion: Pensacola FC
- 2027 U.S. Open Cup: Pensacola FC
- Matches: 245
- Goals: 1,055 (4.31 per match)
- Biggest home win: PEN 14–1 LAX (5/16)
- Biggest away win: LAX 0–8 UNI (5/23); NCS 0–8 IRF (5/31); VAL 0–8 PEN (6/27)
- Highest scoring: PEN 14–1 LAX (5/16)
- All statistics correct as of 01:05, July 30, 2026 (UTC).

The 2026 The League for Clubs season will be the second season of The League for Clubs, a semi-professional 4th tier league in the United States soccer league system.

On July 9, U.S. Soccer announced that the 2026 Champions would qualify directly for the 2027 U.S. Open Cup.

== Clubs ==
Club	City	Stadium	Founded	Announced
Central Region
Mid–American Conference Conference
Emporia FC	Emporia, Kansas	Francis G. Welch Stadium	2022	2026
Evolution U23	La Vista, Nebraska		2012	2026
Tulsa Athletic	Tulsa, Oklahoma	Hicks Park Community Field	2013	July 31, 2024
Union KC SC	Lee's Summit, Missouri	Paragon Star Sports Complex	2005	September 9, 2024
Red River Conference Conference
Central Dallas FC	Dallas, Texas	Toyota Soccer Center	2025	March 3, 2025
Dallas Dragons FC	Dallas, Texas		2026	March 19, 2026
FC Dallas U23s	Frisco, Texas	Toyota Soccer Center	2025	September 5, 2024
Foro SC	Dallas, Texas	Foro Sports Club	2017	March 13, 2025
Oklahoma United FC	Oklahoma City, Oklahoma	Chad Richison Stadium	2024	March 13, 2026
Tenfifteen FC	Dallas, Texas		2025	March 19, 2026
East Region
Northeast Conference
North Division
Brooklyn City F.C.	Brooklyn, New York	Aviator Sports and Events Center	2017	2026
Excelsior New York	Jamaica Bay, New York	York College Athletic Complex	2023	2026
Kingston Stockade FC	Kingston, New York	Dietz Stadium	2015	July 31, 2024
Metropolitan Oval Academy	Queens, New York	Metropolitan Oval	1999	March 19, 2025
SUSA FC Long Island	Central Islip, NY	SUSA Orlin & Cohen Sports Complex	2001	2026
South Division
Atlantic City FC	Egg Harbor Township, New Jersey	Stockton University	2017	July 31, 2024
FC Monmouth	Red Bank, New Jersey	Count Basie Park	2017	August 26, 2024
First State FC	Wilmington, Delaware	Abessinio Stadium	2019	August 28, 2024
Kensington SC	Philadelphia, Pennsylvania	Northeast High School	2010	January 6, 2025
Real Central New Jersey	Princeton, New Jersey	Rider University	2020	2026
South Region
Gulf Coast Conference
West Division
AFC Mobile	Mobile, Alabama	Davidson High School Stadium	2015	Jan 15, 2025
Gaffa FC	Jackson, Mississippi	Saint Andrew's Episcopal School	2017	Mar 18, 2025
NOLA Ramparts FC	New Orleans, Louisiana	Pan American Stadium	2025	2026
Pensacola FC Academy	Pensacola, Florida	Ashton Brosnaham Stadium	2013	Feb 25, 2025
Union 10 FC	Daphne, Alabama	Village Park	2023	Feb 4, 2025
East Division
Legacy FC	Panama City, Florida			2026
Pensacola FC	Pensacola, Florida	Ashton Brosnaham Stadium	2013	Feb 25, 2025
PSC Panama City Beach FC	Panama City Beach, Florida	Publix Sports Park	2017	2026
Tallahassee SC	Tallahassee, Florida	Gene Cox Stadium	2018	Feb 10, 2025
Valdosta FC	Valdosta, Georgia	North Lowndes Park	2024	Jan 31, 2025
South Texas Conference
Austin United FC	Austin, Texas	Veterans Stadium	2017	November 29, 2024
BTX SC	Brownsville, Texas	Brownsville Sports Park		2026
Capital City SC	Austin, Texas		2018	2026
Central Texas Coyotes FC	Temple, Texas	Woodson Field	2018	November 29, 2024
FC Westlake	Austin, Texas	Onion Creek Soccer Complex	1989	2026
RGV Red Crowns SC	Harlingen, Texas	White Wings Stadium	2025	Jan 31, 2025
West Region
NorCal Conference
Afghan Premier FC	Dublin, California	Ohlone College Soccer Field	1991	November 14, 2024
Albion SC Silicon Valley	Redwood City, California	Red Morton Park	2023	August 29, 2024
CF San Rafael	San Rafael, California	San Rafael High School	2023	October 11, 2024
FC Davis	Davis, California	Dairy Complex	2017	July 31, 2024
Fuego FC U-23	Fresno, California	Fresno State Soccer Stadium	2022	January 31, 2025
Iron Rose FC	Roseville, California	West Park High School	2023	September 6, 2024
Napa Valley 1839 FC	Napa, California	Justin-Siena High School	2016	July 31, 2024
North Coast FC Sol (Note: Previously Sonoma County Sol)	Petaluma, California	Petaluma Community Sports Fields	2004	August 20, 2024
Oakland SC	Oakland, California	Oakland Tech High School	1974	August 21, 2024
San Ramon FC	San Ramon, California	Tiffany Roberts Soccer Field	1973	August 22, 2024
Yuba FC	Yuba City, California	River Valley High School	2022	September 24, 2024

== Season ==
=== Competition format ===
- Gulf Coast Conference: Clubs will be divided into North and South division. Each team will play each team in their division once and two cross division matches. Conference champions will play the South Texas Conference champions to be the South Region representatives in the national finals.
- NorCal Conference: Clubs play a total of 10 matches. Each team will have five home and five away games. Top 8 teams enter playoffs. Conference champions will represent the West Region in the national finals.
- Northeast Conference: Clubs will be divided into North and South division. Each team will play each team in their division once and two cross division matches. Conference champions will represent the East Region in the national finals.
- South Texas Conference: Clubs play a total of 10 matches. Each team will have five home and five away games. Top 4 teams enter conference playoffs. Conference champions will play the Gulf Coast Conference champions to be the South Region representatives in the national finals.

==== Central Region ====
===== Mid-American Conference =====
Pos	Team	Pld	W	D	L	GF	GA	GD	Pts	Qualification
1	Evolution U23 (Q)	10	8	0	2	28	7	+21	24	Conference Playoffs
2	Tulsa Athletic (Q, A)	10	5	1	4	20	13	+7	16	Conference Playoffs
3	Union KC	10	3	1	6	10	29	−19	10	
4	Emporia FC	10	2	2	6	8	17	−9	8	

Updated to match(es) played on July 8, 2026. Source: https://www.theleaguefc.com/news/west-region-schedule-announcement
(A) Advance to a further round; (Q) Qualified for the phase indicated

====== Results ======
Home \ Away	EMP	EVO	TUL	UNI	EMP	EVO	TUL	UNI
Emporia FC	—	1–0	1–1	1–2	—	—	2–0	2–2
Evolution U23	3–0* (Note: Forfeit)	—	5–2	5–1	3–0*	—	—	3–0*
Tulsa Athletic	3–0	0–2	—	7–1	1–0	3–0	—	—
Union KC	2–1	0–3	1–0	—	—	0–4	1–3	—

Updated to match(es) played on July 8, 2026. Source: https://www.theleaguefc.com/news/west-region-schedule-announcement
Legend: Blue = home team win; Yellow = draw; Red = away team win.

===== Conference playoff =====
Conference Final; July 12
NE	Evolution U23	1
OK	Tulsa Athletic	3*

Notes

- * = Extra time

===== Red River Conference =====
Pos	Team	Pld	W	D	L	GF	GA	GD	Pts	Qualification
1	Oklahoma United FC (Q, A)	10	8	1	1	36	7	+29	25	Conference Playoffs
2	FC Dallas U23s (Q)	10	7	1	2	34	9	+25	22	Conference Playoffs
3	Central Dallas FC (Q)	10	4	5	1	27	21	+6	17	Conference Playoffs
4	Foro SC (Q)	10	3	2	5	19	26	−7	11	Conference Playoffs
5	Dallas Dragon FC	10	2	1	7	20	33	−13	7	
6	Tenfifteen FC	10	1	0	9	8	48	−40	3	

Updated to match(es) played on July 6, 2026. Source: https://www.theleaguefc.com/news/west-region-schedule-announcement
(A) Advance to a further round; (Q) Qualified for the phase indicated

====== Results ======
Home \ Away	CDF	DDF	FCD	FOR	OKU	TEN
Central Dallas FC	—	4–2	1–1	2–2	2–2	5–0
Dallas Dragon FC	2–2	—	2–4	2–4	1–5	5–3
FC Dallas U23s	5–0	3–0	—	7–0	0–3	5–0
Foro SC	4–4	5–2	1–2	—	0–3	1–2
Oklahoma United FC	2–3	3–0	2–0	1–0	—	8–1
Tenfifteen FC	1–4	0–4	0–7	1–2	0–7	—

Updated to match(es) played on July 6, 2026. Source: https://www.theleaguefc.com/news/west-region-schedule-announcement
Legend: Blue = home team win; Yellow = draw; Red = away team win.

===== Conference playoff =====
Semi-Finals; July 9
OK	Oklahoma United FC	6
TX	Foro SC	1
TX	FC Dallas U23s	1
TX	Central Dallas FC	0

Final; July 12
OK	Oklahoma United FC	2
TX	FC Dallas U23s	0

===== Region playoff =====
Final; July 18
OK	Oklahoma United FC	1
OK	Tulsa Athletic	0

==== East Region ====
===== Northeast Conference =====
====== North Division ======
Pos	Team	Pld	W	D	L	GF	GA	GD	Pts	Qualification
1	Kingston Stockade FC (Q)	8	6	0	2	19	7	+12	18	Conference Playoffs
2	Metropolitan Oval Academy (Q)	8	6	0	2	19	11	+8	18	Conference Playoffs
3	Excelsior New York	8	4	1	3	18	6	+12	13	
4	SUSA FC Long Island	8	3	1	4	21	16	+5	10	
5	Brooklyn City F.C.	8	0	0	8	5	42	−37	0	

Updated to match(es) played on July 11, 2026. Source: https://www.theleaguefc.com/news/west-region-schedule-announcement
(Q) Qualified for the phase indicated

====== South Division ======
Pos	Team	Pld	W	D	L	GF	GA	GD	Pts	Qualification
1	Atlantic City FC (Q)	8	7	0	1	20	8	+12	21	Conference Playoffs
2	First State FC (Q)	8	5	0	3	21	19	+2	15	Conference Playoffs
3	FC Monmouth	8	4	1	3	26	15	+11	13	
4	Real Central New Jersey	8	3	1	4	14	14	0	10	
5	Kensington SC	8	0	0	8	9	34	−25	0	

Updated to match(es) played on July 11, 2026. Source: https://www.theleaguefc.com/news/west-region-schedule-announcement
(Q) Qualified for the phase indicated

====== Results ======
Home \ Away	ATL	BRO	EXC	FIR	KEN	KIN	MOA	MON	RNJ	SUS
Atlantic City FC	—	—	—	2–0	3–0	—	—	3–0	2–1	5–1
Brooklyn City F.C.	4–1	—	0–7	—	—	0–2	0–6	—	—	0–7
Excelsior New York	—	4–0	—	2–2	—	1–2	1–2	—	—	0–0
First State FC	—	—	—	—	6–1	—	0–2	2–7	3–0	—
Kensington SC	3–4	1–0	—	1–2	—	—	—	1–4	2–6	—
Kingston Stockade FC	—	5–1	1–2	—	4–0	—	4–1	—	—	1–0
Metropolitan Oval Academy	—	3–1	1–0	—	—	1–0	—	—	7–1	3–2
FC Monmouth	1–2	—	1–1	3–4	7–0	—	—	—	3–2	—
Real Central New Jersey	1–0	—	—	1–2	2–1	0–3	—	1–1	—	—
SUSA FC Long Island	—	8–3	0–3	—	—	1–4	3–2	3–4	—	—

Updated to match(es) played on July 2, 2026. Source: https://www.theleaguefc.com/news/west-region-schedule-announcement
Legend: Blue = home team win; Yellow = draw; Red = away team win.

===== Conference playoff =====
Semi-Finals; July 15
NJ	Atlantic City FC	4
DE	First State FC	0
NY	Kingston Stockade FC	0
NY	Metropolitan Oval Academy	2

Final; July 20
NJ	Atlantic City FC	1
NY	Metropolitan Oval Academy	5

==== South Region ====
===== Gulf Coast Conference =====
====== East Division ======
Pos	Team	Pld	W	D	L	GF	GA	GD	Pts	Qualification
1	Pensacola FC (Q, A)	10	7	3	0	49	5	+44	24	Conference Playoffs
2	Tallahassee SC (Q)	10	7	2	1	33	12	+21	23	Conference Playoffs
3	PSC Panama City Beach FC	10	6	1	3	15	11	+4	19	
4	Valdosta FC	10	3	1	6	14	29	−15	10	
5	LAX FC	10	0	0	10	5	65	−60	0	

Source: https://www.theleaguefc.com/news/west-region-schedule-announcement
(A) Advance to a further round; (Q) Qualified for the phase indicated

====== West Division ======
Pos	Team	Pld	W	D	L	GF	GA	GD	Pts	Qualification
1	Union 10 FC (Q)	10	9	1	0	39	8	+31	28	Conference Playoffs
2	Gaffa FC (Q)	10	4	3	3	23	19	+4	15	Conference Playoffs
3	Pensacola FC Academy	10	3	2	5	20	23	−3	11	
4	AFC Mobile	10	2	3	5	17	19	−2	9	
5	NOLA Ramparts FC	10	1	0	9	9	33	−24	3	

Source: https://www.theleaguefc.com/news/west-region-schedule-announcement
(Q) Qualified for the phase indicated

====== Results ======
Home \ Away	GAF	LAX	MOB	NOL	PEN	PNA	PSC	TAL	UN1	VAL
Gaffa FC	—		1–1	5–0	0–4	6–2	—	—	3–4	—
LAX FC	—	—	—	—	0–9	—	0–2	0–5	0–8	1–4
AFC Mobile	1–2	—	—	5–0	—	1–1	—	1–2	1–2	—
NOLA Ramparts FC	1–2	—	4–2	—	—	2–3	0–2	—	1–3	—
Pensacola FC	1–1	14–1	—	—	—	—	2–0	2–2	—	6–0
Pensacola FC Academy	2–2	—	2–3	6–0	—	—	—	—	0–4	2–0
PSC Panama City Beach FC	—	3–2	—	2–1	0–2	—	—	3–0	—	2–1
Tallahassee SC	—	8–0	4–1	—	1–1	—	3–1	—	—	5–1
Union 10 FC	3–1	8–0	1–1	3–0	—	3–1	—	—	—	—
Valdosta FC	—	4–1	—	—	0–8	2–1	0–0	2–3	—	—

Source: https://www.theleaguefc.com/news/west-region-schedule-announcement
Legend: Blue = home team win; Yellow = draw; Red = away team win.

===== Conference playoff =====
Semi-Finals; July 8
W1	Union 10 FC	4
W2	Gaffa FC	1
W1	Pensacola FC	1
E2	Tallahassee SC	0

Final; July 12
E1	Union 10 FC	2
W1	Pensacola FC	3

===== South Texas conference =====
Pos	Team	Pld	W	D	L	GF	GA	GD	Pts	Qualification
1	Capital City SC (Q, A)	10	8	1	1	38	11	+27	25	Conference Playoffs
2	RGV Red Crowns SC (Q)	10	7	2	1	36	7	+29	23	Conference Playoffs
3	BTX Soccer Club (Q)	10	3	3	4	15	17	−2	12	Conference Playoffs
4	Central Texas Coyotes FC (Q)	10	4	0	6	12	21	−9	12	Conference Playoffs
5	FC Westlake	10	3	1	6	12	22	−10	10	
6	Austin United FC	10	1	1	8	5	40	−35	4	

Source: https://www.theleaguefc.com/news/west-region-schedule-announcement
(A) Advance to a further round; (Q) Qualified for the phase indicated

====== Results ======
Home \ Away	AUS	BTX	CAP	CTC	FCW	RGV
Austin United FC	—	3–2	0–6	0–3	0–5	0–3
BTX Soccer Club	2–1	—	0–0	2–1	3–0*	1–1
Capital City SC	11–0	4–1	—	5–1	3–1	2–1
Central Texas Coyotes FC	2–1	1–0	1–2	—	0–2	0–5
FC Westlake	0–0	3–0	1–4	0–3	—	0–6
RGV Red Crowns SC	5–0	3–3	5–1	4–0	3–0*	—

Source: https://www.theleaguefc.com/news/west-region-schedule-announcement
Legend: Blue = home team win; Yellow = draw; Red = away team win.

Notes

- * = forfeit

===== Conference playoff =====
Semi-Finals; July 9
TX	Capital City SC	4
TX	Central Texas Coyotes FC	1
TX	RGV Red Crowns SC	2
TX	BTX Soccer Club	0

Final; July 13
TX	Capital City SC	1(4)
TX	RGV Red Crowns SC	1(2)

===== Region playoff =====
Final; July 18
TX	Capital City SC
FL	Pensacola FC	FF (Note: Pensecola FC was awarded the win after it was determined Capital City SC played an unauthorized player)

==== West Region ====
===== NorCal conference =====
Pos	Team	Pld	W	D	L	GF	GA	GD	Pts	Qualification
1	San Ramon FC (Q)	10	9	0	1	37	15	+22	27	Region Playoffs
2	Iron Rose FC (Q, A)	10	8	1	1	46	9	+37	25	Region Playoffs
3	Napa Valley 1839 FC (Q)	10	5	2	3	24	20	+4	17	Region Playoffs
4	Fuego FC U-23 (Q)	10	4	4	2	33	22	+11	16	Region Playoffs
5	FC Davis (Q)	10	3	5	2	24	20	+4	14	Region Playoffs
6	Afghan Premier (Q)	10	4	1	5	13	16	−3	13	Region Playoffs
7	North Coast FC Sol (Q)	10	3	2	5	13	22	−9	11	Region Playoffs
8	Albion SC Silicon Valley (Q)	10	2	4	4	22	20	+2	10	Region Playoffs
9	Oakland SC	10	1	4	5	13	22	−9	7	
10	CF San Rafael	10	2	1	7	9	34	−25	7	
11	Yuba FC	10	2	0	8	13	47	−34	6	

Source: https://www.theleaguefc.com/west-standings
(A) Advance to a further round; (Q) Qualified for the phase indicated

====== Results ======
Home \ Away	AFG	ALB	CSR	DAV	FUE	IRF	NCS	NPV	OAK	SRF	YUB
Afghan Premier	—	1–0			1–4	1–1				1–3	1–2
Albion SC Silicon Valley		—	2–3		2–2			6–2	1–1		4–0
CF San Rafael	0–5		—		2–1		0–2			0–5	1–2
FC Davis	3–0	3–3	3–0	—		1–2	2–2				
Fuego FC U-23				4–4	—		2–1	2–2	3–3		11–0
Iron Rose FC		3–0	10–0		4–0	—				3–4	9–1
Sonoma County Sol FC	1–2	1–1				0–8	—	0–2		0–4	
Napa Valley 1839 FC	2–0		2–1	1–1		2–3		—	5–2		
Oakland SC	0–1		2–2	1–1		0–3*	1–2		—		
San Ramon FC		4–3		4–2	3–4			4–0	3–0*	—	
Yuba FC				3–4			0–4	2–7	1–3	2–3	—

Source: https://www.theleaguefc.com/west-schedule (Note: forfeit)
Legend: Blue = home team win; Yellow = draw; Red = away team win.

===== Region playoff =====
Quarterfinals; June 20–21
1	San Ramon FC	4
8	Albion SC Silicon Valley	0
4	Fuego U-23	3
5	FC Davis	1
3	Napa Valley 1839 FC	2 (4)
6	Afghan Premier	2 (5)
2	Iron Rose FC	4
7	Sonoma County Sol FC	1

Semi-finals; June 27–28
1	San Ramon FC	5
4	Fuego U-23	4
6	Afghan Premier	0
2	Iron Rose FC	5

Finals
1	San Ramon FC	1
2	Iron Rose FC	6

=== National playoffs ===
Semi-Finals; July 24
E	Metropolitan Oval Academy	2
S	Pensacola FC	4
W	Iron Rose FC	3
C	Oklahoma United FC	2

Final; July 26
S	Pensacola FC	1
C	Oklahoma United FC	0
