= 2025 The League for Clubs season =

US soccer league season

The League for Clubs
- Season: 2025
- Dates: March 15 – July 2 (regular season); July 5 – July 20 (region playoffs); July 25 – July 27 (national playoffs)
- Champion: Metropolitan Oval Academy
- Matches: 252
- Goals: 1,274 (5.06 per match)
- Top goalscorer: (United States) Alexadre Bernier (Oakland SC) – 22 goals
- Biggest home win: New York Braveheart SC 11–0 Lighthouse Boys Club of Kensington; Pensacola FC 11–0 Sowegens SC
- Biggest away win: FC Revolution 0–12 Austin United FC
- Highest scoring: FC Revolution 0–12 Austin United FC
- All statistics correct as of 00:46, July 28, 2025 (UTC).

The 2025 The League for Clubs season was the first season of The League for Clubs, a semi-professional 4th tier league in the United States soccer league system.

== Teams ==
Team	City	Stadium	Founded	Announced
Central Region
Austin United FC	Austin, Texas	Veterans Stadium	2017	November 29, 2024
Central Dallas FC	Dallas, Texas		2025	March 3, 2025
Central Texas Coyotes FC	Temple, Texas	Woodson Field	2018	November 29, 2024
Corinthians FC of San Antonio	San Antonio, Texas	Corinthians FC Soccer Complex	2009	October 28, 2024
FC Dallas U23s	Frisco, Texas			September 5, 2024
FC Revolution	Fort Worth, Texas	Scarborough-Handley Field		February 27, 2025
FC Wichita	Wichita, Kansas	Stryker Sports Complex	2013	September 11, 2024
Foro SC	Dallas, Texas		2017	March 13, 2025
Inter Detroit	Detroit, Michigan		2019	October 7, 2024
Oklahoma City 1889 FC	Oklahoma City, Oklahoma	Brian Harvey Field	2017	November 25, 2024
Regals SCA	Houston, Texas	British Internation School of Houston	2009	September 5, 2024
RGV Red Crowns SC	Harlingen, Texas	White Wings Stadium	2025	January 31, 2025
River Valley Bully's SC	Fort Smith, Arkansas	Ben Geren Soccer Complex		November 7, 2024
Tulsa Athletic	Tulsa, Oklahoma	Hicks Park Community Field	2013	July 31, 2024
Tyler FC	Tyler, Texas		2016	March 10, 2025
Union KC SC	Lee's Summit, Missouri	Paragon Star Sports Complex	2005	September 9, 2024
East Region
Atlantic City FC	Egg Harbor Township, New Jersey	Stockton University	2017	July 31, 2024
Lighthouse Boys Club of Kensington	Philadelphia, Pennsylvania	Lighthouse Sports & Entertainment Complex	1897	December 24, 2024
Kensington SC	Philadelphia, Pennsylvania	Northeast High School	2010	January 6, 2025
Metropolitan Oval Academy	Queens, New York	Metropolitan Oval	1999	March 19, 2025
FC Monmouth	Red Bank, New Jersey	Count Basie Park	2017	August 26, 2024
First State FC	Wilmington, Delaware	Abessinio Stadium	2019	August 28, 2024
Kingston Stockade FC	Kingston, New York	Tenney Stadium	2015	July 31, 2024
New York Braveheart SC	New York City, New York	Michael J. Tully Park	2022	September 2, 2024
South Region
AFC Mobile	Mobile, Alabama		2015	January 15, 2025
Gaffa FC	Jackson, Mississippi	Saint Andrew's Episcopal School	2017	March 18, 2025
Gulf Coast United FC	Gulfport, Mississippi		2013	February 28, 2025
Pensacola FC	Pensacola, Florida	Ashton Brosnaham Stadium	2013	February 25, 2025
Pensacola FC Academy	Pensacola, Florida	Ashton Brosnaham Stadium	2013	February 25, 2025
Sowegans SC	Leesburg, Georgia	Lee County Soccer Complex	2023	January 8, 2025
Tallahassee SC	Tallahassee, Florida	Gene Cox Stadium	2018	February 10, 2025
Union 10 FC	Daphne, Alabama	Village Park	2023	February 4, 2025
Valdosta FC	Valdosta, Georgia		2024	January 31, 2025
West Region
Afghan Premier FC	Dublin, California	Ohlone College Soccer Field	1991	November 14, 2024
Albion SC Silicon Valley	Redwood City, California	Sequoia High School	2023	August 29, 2024
Bay Valley Suns	Livermore, California	Las Positas College	2024	August 20, 2024
CF San Rafael	San Rafael, California	San Rafael High School	2023	October 11, 2024
FC Davis	Davis, California	Dairy Complex	2017	July 31, 2024
Fuego FC U-23	Fresno, California	Fresno State Soccer Stadium	2022	January 31, 2025
Iron Rose FC	Roseville, California	West Park High School	2023	September 6, 2024
Napa Valley 1839 FC	Napa, California	Justin-Siena High School	2016	July 31, 2024
Oakland SC	Oakland, California	Oakland Tech High School	1974	August 21, 2024
San Ramon FC	San Ramon, California	Tiffany Roberts Soccer Field	1973	August 22, 2024
Silicon Valley Rush	San Jose, California	Yerba Buena High School	2022	August 20, 2024
Sonoma County Sol	Petaluma, California	Petaluma Community Sports Fields	2004	August 20, 2024
Yuba FC	Yuba City, California	River Valley High School	2022	September 24, 2024

== Season ==
=== Competition format ===
- NorCal Conference: Clubs play a total of 12 matches. Single table, round robin. Top 8 teams enter playoffs.
- Northeast Conference: Clubs will be divided into North and South division. Top 2 teams from each division enter playoffs to determine conference champions that will advance to the national championship.

==== West Region ====
===== NorCal Conference =====
Pos	Team	Pld	W	D	L	GF	GA	GD	Pts	Qualification
1	FC Davis (Q)	12	11	1	0	41	18	+23	34	Playoffs
2	Oakland SC (Q)	12	10	1	1	47	16	+31	31	Playoffs
3	Napa Valley 1839 FC (C)	12	9	1	2	41	15	+26	28	Playoffs
4	Fuego FC U-23 (Q)	12	7	2	3	42	20	+22	23	Playoffs
5	San Ramon FC (Q)	12	7	2	3	42	28	+14	23	Playoffs
6	Albion SC Silicon Valley (Q)	12	5	2	5	19	24	−5	17	Playoffs
7	Yuba FC (Q)	12	5	1	6	32	35	−3	16	Playoffs
8	Silicon Valley Rush	12	4	1	7	24	25	−1	13	
9	Iron Rose FC	12	4	0	8	14	41	−27	12	
10	Afghan Premier (Q)	12	3	1	8	19	33	−14	10	Playoffs
11	Bay Valley Suns	12	2	2	8	18	38	−20	8	
12	CF San Rafael	12	1	3	8	22	45	−23	6	
13	Sonoma County Sol	12	1	1	10	11	34	−23	4	

Updated to match(es) played on June 17, 2025. Source: https://www.theleaguefc.com/news/west-region-schedule-announcement
(C) Champions; (Q) Qualified for the phase indicated

====== Results ======
Home \ Away	AFG	ALB	BAY	CSR	DAV	FUE	IRF	NPV	OAK	SON	SRF	SVR	YUB
Afghan Premier	—		3–0* (Note: Afghan Premier earned forfeit win)	7–1	0–2			1–7	0–5				
Albion SC Silicon Valley	0–0	—	3–0							5–3	2–0	1–6	
Bay Valley Suns			—		1–3		4–0	2–4	1–7	2–1			
CF San Rafael		2–3		—	3–5		1–2	3–4	2–6			2–2	
FC Davis					—	4–3		1–0	3–2		2–2	4–3	5–2
Fuego FC U-23	2–0	2–0	9–1	7–1		—	4–1					3–1	
Iron Rose FC	2–1	0–2			2–7		—	0–4	1–7	2–0			
Napa Valley 1839 FC		6–2				2–2		—		4–0	4–2	3–0	4–1
Oakland SC		0–0				4–3		1–0	—		6–2	2–1	3–2
Sonoma County Sol	0–3				0–2	1–1			1–4	—	1–3		3–1
San Ramon FC	6–4		3–3	4–1		4–1	7–0				—		6–2
Silicon Valley Rush	2–1		3–0* (Note: Rush Silicon Valley earned forfeit win)				1–2			5–0	2–3	—	1–3
Yuba FC	7–2	2–1	6–2			1–5	3–1						—

Updated to match(es) played on June 17, 2025. Source: https://www.theleaguefc.com/news/west-region-schedule-announcement
Legend: Blue = home team win; Yellow = draw; Red = away team win.

===== Region playoff =====
Quarterfinals; June 21–22
3	Napa Valley 1839 FC	3
6	Albion SC Silicon Valley	2
2	Oakland SC	0
7	Yuba FC	2
1	FC Davis	4
10	Afghan Premier	0
4	Fuego FC U-23	3
5	San Ramon FC	4

Semi-finals; June 28/29
3	Napa Valley 1839 FC	4
7	Yuba FC	0
1	FC Davis	2
5	San Ramon FC	4

Final; July 12
3	Napa Valley 1839 FC	1(4)
5	San Ramon FC	1(2)

==== East Region ====
===== Northeast Conference =====
====== North Division ======
Pos	Team	Pld	W	D	L	GF	GA	GD	Pts	Qualification
1	FC Monmouth (Q)	10	8	1	1	27	8	+19	25	Playoffs
2	Metropolitan Oval Academy (C)	10	7	2	1	32	11	+21	23	Playoffs
3	Kingston Stockade FC	11	5	1	5	34	21	+13	16	
4	New York Braveheart SC	10	2	1	7	25	34	−9	7	

Updated to match(es) played on July 12, 2025. Source: https://www.theleaguefc.com/news/west-region-schedule-announcement
(C) Champions; (Q) Qualified for the phase indicated

====== South Division ======
Pos	Team	Pld	W	D	L	GF	GA	GD	Pts	Qualification
1	Atlantic City FC (Q)	10	6	3	1	30	8	+22	21	Playoffs
2	Kensington SC (Q)	10	3	3	4	13	19	−6	12	Playoffs
3	First State FC	10	3	1	6	25	27	−2	10	
4	Lighthouse Boys Club of Kensington	10	1	0	9	7	65	−58	3	

Updated to match(es) played on July 12, 2025. Source: https://www.theleaguefc.com/news/west-region-schedule-announcement
(Q) Qualified for the phase indicated

====== Results ======
Home \ Away	ATL	FIR	KEN	KIN	LIG	MOA	MON	NYB
Atlantic City FC	—	3–2	2–2			0–0	1–2	
First State FC	0–3	—	2–2	3–1	5–3			3–4
Kensington SC	0–0	3–1	—	1–5	0–3* (Note: Lighthouse Boys awarded forfeit win)			3–1
Kingston Stockade FC	1–3			—	10–0	0–3	1–1	4–2
Lighthouse Boys Club of Kensington	1–7	1–7	2–4		—	0–7	0–6	
Metropolitan Oval Academy		5–2	7–2	3–1		—	2–0	4–2
FC Monmouth		2–0	1–0	2–1		3–0	—	3–2
New York Braveheart SC	0–3			1–6	11–0	1–1	1–7	—

First match(es) will be played: July 12, 2025. Source: https://www.theleaguefc.com/news/west-region-schedule-announcement
Legend: Blue = home team win; Yellow = draw; Red = away team win.

===== Region playoff =====
Semifinals; July 16
S1	Atlantic City FC	3
N2	FC Monmouth	1
N1	Metropolitan Oval Academy	3
S2	Kensington SC	2

Final; July 19
S1	Atlantic City FC	0
N2	Metropolitan Oval Academy	1

==== South Region ====
===== Gulf Coast Conference =====
====== East Division ======
Pos	Team	Pld	W	D	L	GF	GA	GD	Pts	Qualification
1	Pensacola FC (Q)	10	9	0	1	42	5	+37	27	Playoffs
2	Tallahassee SC (Q)	10	8	1	1	43	8	+35	25	Playoffs
3	Sowegans SC	10	3	1	6	12	37	−25	10	
4	Valdosta FC	10	1	0	9	10	42	−32	3	

Updated to match(es) played on July 5, 2025. Source: https://www.theleaguefc.com/news/west-region-schedule-announcement
(Q) Qualified for the phase indicated

====== West Division ======
Pos	Team	Pld	W	D	L	GF	GA	GD	Pts	Qualification
1	Union 10 FC (Q)	10	9	0	1	37	8	+29	27	Playoffs
2	Gaffa FC (Q)	10	6	0	4	35	17	+18	18	Playoffs
3	Pensacola FC Academy	10	4	1	5	14	23	−9	13	
4	Gulf Coast United FC	10	3	0	7	14	33	−19	9	
5	AFC Mobile	10	0	1	9	9	43	−34	1	

Updated to match(es) played on July 5, 2025. Source: https://www.theleaguefc.com/news/west-region-schedule-announcement
(Q) Qualified for the phase indicated

====== Results ======
Home \ Away	MOB	GAF	GCU	PEN	PNA	SOW	TAL	VAL	UN1
AFC Mobile	—	0–6	3–5		1–2		0–4		1–4
Gaffa FC	8–0	—	5–1	2–4	6–0				4–3
Gulf Coast United FC	3–1	0–2	—	1–6	2–0				0–6
Pensacola FC		3–0		—		1–0	0–1	9–0	
Pensacola FC Academy	1–1	4–1	3–2		—			2–1	0–1
Sowegans SC				0–4		—	1–1	4–0	1–3
Tallahassee SC	4–1			0–2		6–1	—	5–0	
Valdosta FC				1–2	3–2	0–2	2–6	—	
Union 10 FC	6–1	2–1	3–0		5–0				—

Updated to match(es) played on July 5, 2025. Source: https://www.theleaguefc.com/news/west-region-schedule-announcement
Legend: Blue = home team win; Yellow = draw; Red = away team win.

Notes

Home \ Away	MOB	GAF	GCU	PEN	PNA	SOW	TAL	VAL	UN1
AFC Mobile	—								
Gaffa FC		—							
Gulf Coast United FC			—						
Pensacola FC				—		11–0			
Pensacola FC Academy					—				
Sowegans SC						—	0–9		
Tallahassee SC							—	7–1	
Valdosta FC						2–3		—	
Union 10 FC			4–0						—

First match(es) will be played: Jun 11. Source: https://www.theleaguefc.com/news/west-region-schedule-announcement
Legend: Blue = home team win; Yellow = draw; Red = away team win.

===== Conference playoff =====
Semi-Finals; July 9
E1	Pensacola FC	3
W2	Gaffa FC	0
W1	Union 10 FC	3
E2	Tallahassee SC	1

Final; July 13
E1	Pensacola FC	1(2)
W1	Union 10 FC	1(4)

===== Texas Conference =====
Pos	Team	Pld	W	D	L	GF	GA	GD	Pts	Qualification
1	FC Dallas U23s (Q)	10	8	0	2	41	14	+27	24	Playoffs
2	Austin United FC (Q)	10	7	2	1	32	13	+19	23	Playoffs
3	Central Dallas FC (Q)	10	6	2	2	23	10	+13	20	Playoffs
4	RGV Red Crowns SC	9	5	0	4	12	12	0	15	
5	Corinthians FC of San Antonio (Q)	9	4	2	3	8	9	−1	14	Playoffs
6	Central Texas Coyotes FC	10	4	1	5	24	25	−1	13	
7	Foro SC	8	4	1	3	24	22	+2	13	
8	FC Revolution	10	1	1	8	11	49	−38	4	
9	Tyler FC	10	0	1	9	15	37	−22	1	

Updated to match(es) played on July 2, 2025. Source: https://www.theleaguefc.com/news/west-region-schedule-announcement
(Q) Qualified for the phase indicated

====== Results ======
Home \ Away	AUS	CDF	CTC	CSA	FCD	FCR	FOR	RGV	TYL
Austin United FC	—		4–0	3–2	1–6			1–0	2–0
Central Dallas FC	2–2	—	0–3	0–0		7–0			3–1
Central Texas Coyotes FC		1–3	—		2–6	6–1	3–4	0–2	
Corinthians FC of San Antonio	0–2		0–0	—	2–3			2–0	3–0 (Note: Corinthians San Antonio awarded forfeit win)
FC Dallas U23s		1–2			—	7–1	4–1	0–2	5–1
FC Revolution	0–12		1–3	0–3 (Note: Corinthians San Antonio awarded forfeit win)	2–10	—	2–7		
Foro SC	1–1	1–2		PP	0–3 (Note: FC Dallas awarded forfeit win)		—		8–0
RGV Red Crowns SC	2–4	1–0		1–2		3–0 (Note: RGV awarded forfeit win)	PP	—	
Tyler FC		0–4	4–6			4–4	1–2	3–4	—

Updated to match(es) played on July 2, 2025. Source: https://www.theleaguefc.com/news/west-region-schedule-announcement
Legend: Blue = home team win; Yellow = draw; Red = away team win.

===== Conference playoff =====
Conference Semifinals; July 9
1	FC Dallas U23s	3
3	Central Dallas FC	2
2	Austin United FC	3
5	Corinthians FC of San Antonio	1

Conference Final; July 13
1	FC Dallas U23s	3
2	Austin United FC	2

===== Region playoff =====
Final; July 20
GC	Union 10 FC	0
TX	FC Dallas U23s	1

==== Central Region ====
===== Mid–American Conference =====
Pos	Team	Pld	W	D	L	GF	GA	GD	Pts	Qualification
1	Tulsa Athletic (C)	10	6	2	2	20	7	+13	20	Playoffs
2	Oklahoma City 1889 FC	10	6	0	4	18	14	+4	18	
3	FC Wichita	10	2	3	5	11	17	−6	9	
4	Union KC SC	10	2	3	5	12	24	−12	9	

Updated to match(es) played on July 1, 2025. Source: https://www.theleaguefc.com/news/west-region-schedule-announcement
(C) Champions

====== Results ======
Home \ Away	WIC	OKC	TUL	UNI
FC Wichita	—	3–1	0–0	3–1
Oklahoma City 1889 FC	3–1	—	1–2	3–1
Tulsa Athletic	PP	1–2	—	7–0
Union KC SC	1–1	3–2	1–2	—

First match(es) will be played: July 1, 2025. Source: https://www.theleaguefc.com/news/west-region-schedule-announcement
Legend: Blue = home team win; Yellow = draw; Red = away team win.

Home \ Away	WIC	OKC	TUL	UNI
FC Wichita	—	2–0		1–1
Oklahoma City 1889 FC		—	2–0	2–0
Tulsa Athletic	3–0	2–0	—	
Union KC SC	3–2		1–1	—

First match(es) will be played: July 1, 2025. Source: https://www.theleaguefc.com/news/west-region-schedule-announcement
Legend: Blue = home team win; Yellow = draw; Red = away team win.

===== Mountain Premier Conference =====
Pos	Team	Pld	W	D	L	GF	GA	GD	Pts	Qualification
1	Northern Colorado Hailstorm FC	6	5	1	0	14	6	+8	16	
2	Peak XI (C)	6	3	1	2	9	9	0	10	Playoffs
3	BUFC Pumas (Q)	6	2	1	3	11	11	0	7	Playoffs
4	Real Colorado Foxes (Q)	6	0	1	5	7	15	−8	1	Playoffs

Updated to match(es) played on July 2, 2025. Source: https://www.theleaguefc.com/news/west-region-schedule-announcement
(C) Champions; (Q) Qualified for the phase indicated

====== Results ======
Home \ Away	BUF	NCH	PXI	RCF
BUFC Pumas	—	1–2	1–2	4–1
Northern Colorado Hailstorm FC	2–0	—	2–1	2–0
Peak XI	1–1	2–4	—	2–1
Real Colorado Foxes	3–4	2–2	0–1	—

Updated to match(es) played on July 2, 2025. Source: https://www.theleaguefc.com/news/west-region-schedule-announcement
Legend: Blue = home team win; Yellow = draw; Red = away team win.

===== Conference playoff =====
Semi-Finals; July 5/6			Finals; July 12
			2	Peak XI	2
			3	BUFC Pumas	0
3	BUFC Pumas	3	3	BUFC Pumas	0
4	Real Colorado Foxes	1

===== Region playoff =====
Final; July 19
MA	Tulsa Athletic	4
MP	Peak XI	1

=== National playoffs ===
Semi-Finals; July 24
E	Metropolitan Oval Academy	3
C	Tulsa Athletic	2
W	Napa Valley 1839 FC	2
S	FC Dallas U–23	0

Final; July 26
E	Metropolitan Oval Academy	2 (3)
W	Napa Valley 1839 FC	2 (2)
Third Place; July 26
