= The League for Clubs =

American amateur soccer league

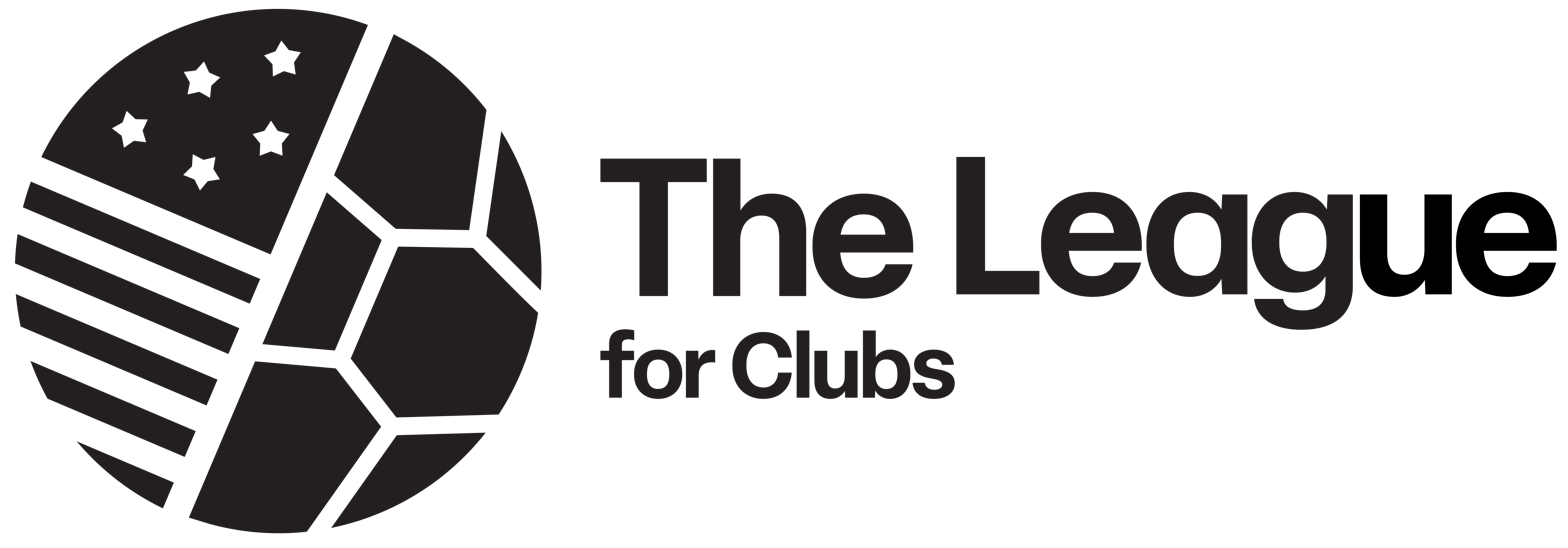
- Founded: 2024; 2 years ago
- First season: 2025
- Country: United States
- Confederation: CONCACAF
- Divisions: 4 regions & 1 conference
- Number of clubs: 47 (2026)
- Level on pyramid: 4
- Relegation to: Gulf Coast Premier League (for Gulf Coast Conference teams); Metroplex Premier League (for Red River Conference teams); Mountain Premier League; Midwest Premier League (for Mid-American conference teams)
- Domestic cup: U.S. Open Cup
- Current champions: Pensacola FC (2026)
- Most championships: Metropolitan Oval Academy; Pensacola FC (1 title)
- Website: theleaguefc.com
- Current: 2026

The League for Clubs is an American men's soccer league composed of amateur level teams. Founded in 2024, the League For Clubs is a partnership between the Women's Premier Soccer League and existing men's clubs, affiliated with the United States Adult Soccer Association (USASA).

The inaugural season began in March 2025, with the Metropolitan Oval Academy crowned as the TLFC first champion.

== Background ==
The League for Clubs was created in 2024, following dissatisfaction among several clubs with the National Premier Soccer League, with the stated aims of improving competitive structures, strengthening community ties, and supporting club operations. Its model emphasises limited geographical size of conferences, expanded production standards, and increased organisational flexibility. Individuals and teams involved in its formation include Peter Wilt, the GM of MLS side Chicago Fire and a founding member of multiple professional clubs in the United States, as well as Tulsa Athletic, the 2023 NPSL champions who were suspended by the NPSL for the 2024 season. Other clubs included Kingston Stockade FC, Atlantic City FC, Napa Valley 1839 FC, and FC Davis. The clubs claimed that there were management issues with the NPSL and rising costs that led to their decision. Critics have suggested that the NPSL has been suffering in the 2020s with minimal expansion and losing top teams, mostly to USL League Two.

The League for Clubs uses a financial model unique in the US Soccer landscape; Clubs hold a stake in the success of the league through revenue sharing and credits. If there is a sale of a member, the remaining clubs will receive 51% of the net proceeds in order to preserve the strength and to give a benefit to all clubs growing the game.

=== Partnerships ===
On December 11, 2024, The League for Clubs announced they had established a partnership with Gulf Coast Premier League, in an effort to establish the base for a promotion-relegation system between the two leagues. On December 28, 2024, a partnership with Metroplex Premier League in the Dallas–Fort Worth area was announced, beginning in 2025. On April 1, 2025, The League for Clubs announced a third partnership with the Mountain Premier League, which will be part of the final conference, the Mountain Premier Conference, and whose champions will earn a spot in the national championship tournament. In 2025 the Mountain Premier League plans to begin promotion/relegation with the Mountain Premier Conference to allow teams to have both regional and national opportunities. On May 19, 2025, TLC announced a strategic partnership with Midwest Premier League starting in 2026 with the formation of the Midwest Premier Conference. In 2027, promotion/relegation between Midwest Premier League and the Midwest Premier Conference will begin.

== Current clubs ==
| Club | City | Stadium | Founded | Announced |
Central Region
Mid–American Conference Conference
| Emporia FC | Emporia, Kansas | Francis G. Welch Stadium | 2022 | 2026 |
| Evolution U23 | La Vista, Nebraska | | 2012 | 2026 |
| Tulsa Athletic | Tulsa, Oklahoma | Hicks Park Community Field | 2013 | July 31, 2024 |
| Union KC SC | Lee's Summit, Missouri | Paragon Star Sports Complex | 2005 | September 9, 2024 |
Red River Conference Conference
| Central Dallas FC | Dallas, Texas | Toyota Soccer Center | 2025 | March 3, 2025 |
| Dallas Dragons FC | Dallas, Texas | | 2026 | March 19, 2026 |
| FC Dallas U23s | Frisco, Texas | Toyota Soccer Center | 2025 | September 5, 2024 |
| Foro SC | Dallas, Texas | Foro Sports Club | 2017 | March 13, 2025 |
| Oklahoma United FC | Oklahoma City, Oklahoma | Chad Richison Stadium | 2024 | March 13, 2026 |
| Tenfifteen FC | Dallas, Texas | | 2025 | March 19, 2026 |
East Region
Northeast Conference
North Division
| Brooklyn City F.C. | Brooklyn, New York | Aviator Sports and Events Center | 2017 | 2026 |
| Excelsior New York | Jamaica Bay, New York | York College Athletic Complex | 2023 | 2026 |
| Kingston Stockade FC | Kingston, New York | Dietz Stadium | 2015 | July 31, 2024 |
| Metropolitan Oval Academy | Queens, New York | Metropolitan Oval | 1999 | March 19, 2025 |
| SUSA FC Long Island | Central Islip, NY | SUSA Orlin & Cohen Sports Complex | 2001 | 2026 |
South Division
| Atlantic City FC | Egg Harbor Township, New Jersey | Stockton University | 2017 | July 31, 2024 |
| FC Monmouth | Red Bank, New Jersey | Count Basie Park | 2017 | August 26, 2024 |
| First State FC | Wilmington, Delaware | Abessinio Stadium | 2019 | August 28, 2024 |
| Kensington SC | Philadelphia, Pennsylvania | Northeast High School | 2010 | January 6, 2025 |
| Real Central New Jersey | Princeton, New Jersey | Rider University | 2020 | 2026 |
South Region
Gulf Coast Conference
West Division
| AFC Mobile | Mobile, Alabama | Davidson High School Stadium | 2015 | Jan 15, 2025 |
| Gaffa FC | Jackson, Mississippi | Saint Andrew's Episcopal School | 2017 | Mar 18, 2025 |
| NOLA Ramparts FC | New Orleans, Louisiana | | | 2026 |
| Pensacola FC Academy | Pensacola, Florida | Ashton Brosnaham Stadium | 2013 | Feb 25, 2025 |
| Union 10 FC | Daphne, Alabama | Village Park | 2023 | Feb 4, 2025 |
East Division
| Legacy FC | Panama City, Florida | | | 2026 |
| Pensacola FC | Pensacola, Florida | Ashton Brosnaham Stadium | 2013 | Feb 25, 2025 |
| PSC Panama City Beach FC | Panama City Beach, Florida | Publix Sports Park | 2017 | 2026 |
| Tallahassee SC | Tallahassee, Florida | Gene Cox Stadium | 2018 | Feb 10, 2025 |
| Valdosta FC | Valdosta, Georgia | North Lowndes Park | 2024 | Jan 31, 2025 |
South Texas Conference
| Austin United FC | Austin, Texas | Veterans Stadium | 2017 | November 29, 2024 |
| BTX SC | Brownsville, Texas | Brownsville Sports Park | | 2026 |
| Capital City SC | Austin, Texas | | 2018 | 2026 |
| Central Texas Coyotes FC | Temple, Texas | Woodson Field | 2018 | November 29, 2024 |
| FC Westlake | Austin, Texas | Onion Creek Soccer Complex | 1989 | 2026 |
| RGV Red Crowns SC | Harlingen, Texas | White Wings Stadium | 2025 | Jan 31, 2025 |
West Region
NorCal Conference
| Afghan Premier FC | Dublin, California | Ohlone College Soccer Field | 1991 | November 14, 2024 |
| Albion SC Silicon Valley | Redwood City, California | Red Morton Park | 2023 | August 29, 2024 |
| CF San Rafael | San Rafael, California | San Rafael High School | 2023 | October 11, 2024 |
| FC Davis | Davis, California | Dairy Complex | 2017 | July 31, 2024 |
| Fuego FC U-23 | Fresno, California | Fresno State Soccer Stadium | 2022 | January 31, 2025 |
| Iron Rose FC | Roseville, California | West Park High School | 2023 | September 6, 2024 |
| Napa Valley 1839 FC | Napa, California | Justin-Siena High School | 2016 | July 31, 2024 |
| North Coast FC Sol (Note: Previously Sonoma County Sol) | Petaluma, California | Petaluma Community Sports Fields | 2004 | August 20, 2024 |
| Oakland SC | Oakland, California | Oakland Tech High School | 1974 | August 21, 2024 |
| San Ramon FC | San Ramon, California | Tiffany Roberts Soccer Field | 1973 | August 22, 2024 |
| Yuba FC | Yuba City, California | River Valley High School | 2022 | September 24, 2024 |

== Future clubs ==
| Club | City | Stadium | Founded | Season |
|---|---|---|---|---|
| FC Soho | Brooklyn Heights, New York | | 2026 | 2027 |
| Keystone FC | Mechanicsburg, Pennsylvania | | 2011 | 2027 |
| Laredo Heat | Laredo, Texas | PEG Energy Stadium | 2004 | 2027 |
| United Soccer Group | Pittsfield, Massachusetts | | 2023 | 2027 |
| Waco SC | Waco, Texas | | 2018 | 2027 |

== Locations ==
The League for Clubs
NorCal Conference; Central Region; East Region; South Region; Mountain Premier Conference; Future club

=== California ===
The League for Clubs (California)
NorCal Conference

=== San Francisco Bay ===
The League for Clubs (San Francisco Bay Area)
NorCal Conference

== Records and champions ==
| Season | Winner | Score | Runner-up |
|---|---|---|---|
| 2025 | Metropolitan Oval Academy | 2–2 (Pen. 3–2) | Napa Valley 1839 FC |
| 2026 | Pensacola FC | 1–0 | Iron Rose FC |

== Previous clubs ==
| Club | City | First Season | Last Season |
|---|---|---|---|
| Bay Valley Suns | Livermore, California | 2025 | 2025 |
| CFA Aurora FC | Denver, Colorado | 2022 | 2025 |
| Corinthians FC of San Antonio | San Antonio, Texas | 2025 | 2025 |
| FC Revolution | Fort Worth, Texas | 2021 | 2025 |
| FC Wichita | Wichita, Kansas | 2013 | 2025 |
| Gulf Coast United FC | Gulfport, Mississippi | 2025 | 2025 |
| Lighthouse Boys Club of Kensington | Philadelphia, Pennsylvania | 2025 | 2025 |
| New York Braveheart SC | New York City, New York | 2025 | 2025 |
| Northern Colorado Hailstorm FC | Windsor, Colorado | 2022 | 2025 |
| Oklahoma City 1889 FC | Oklahoma City, Oklahoma | 2017 | 2025 |
| Peak XI FC | Superior, Colorado | 2020 | 2025 |
| Real Colorado Foxes | Douglas County, Colorado | 2009 | 2025 |
| Silicon Valley Rush | San Jose, California | 2025 | 2025 |
| Sowegans SC | Leesburg, Georgia | 2025 | 2025 |
| Tyler FC | Tyler, Texas | 2016 | 2025 |
