= Kingston Stockade FC =

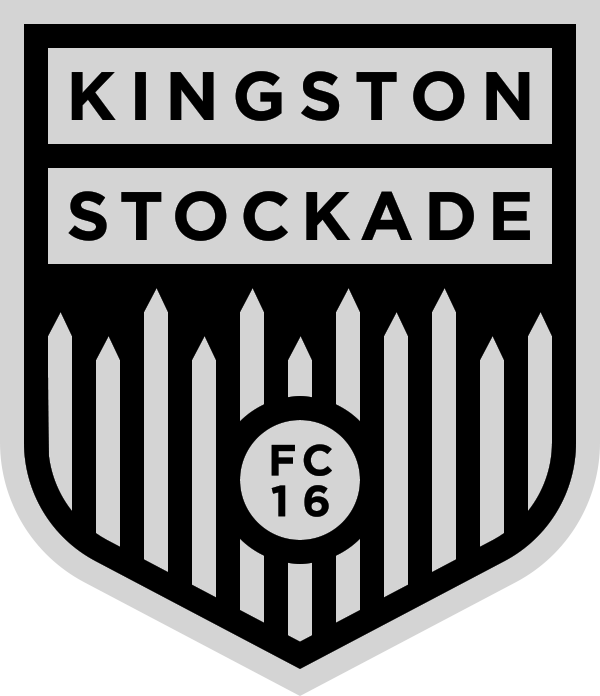
- Full name: Kingston Stockade Football Club
- Founded: 2015; 11 years ago
- Stadium: Dietz Stadium; Kingston, New York
- Capacity: 5,000
- Chairman: Dennis Crowley
- Head coach: Jamal Lis-Simmons
- League: The League for Clubs
- Website: stockadefc.com
Home colors	Away colors

Kingston Stockade Football Club is an American soccer team based in Kingston, New York. The team was founded in November 2015, and began its first season in May 2016. The team's usual home is Dietz Stadium in Kingston, the team played the 2023 season at Tenney Stadium in Poughkeepsie due to ongoing renovations at Dietz.

The team plays in the The League For Clubs, a US amateur soccer league launched in 2024. The team competes in the North division of the Northeast conference of The League For Clubs.

== History ==
In February 2016, George Vizvary was named head coach, Rory Becker was named assistant coach, and Chuck Wilder was named goalkeeper coach for the club's inaugural season. Dan Hoffay and Nick Hoffay were named the club's lead scouts.

In January 2017, management announced that David Lindholm, a coach for Bard College's soccer team, would replace Vizvary as the new head of the coaching staff. In February of the same year, Lindholm announced his coaching staff. Rory Becker and Charles Wilder will continue as assistant coach and goalkeeper coach respectively. Newcomer Ben Walsh will serve as a second assistant coach to Lindholm.

The team is named after the stockade fortification that protected the original Dutch settlement of Kingston back in the 1600s. Dietz Stadium is a short walk from the historic Kingston Stockade District. The stockade fortification is also referenced in the team's crest. The name of the team's first supporters group, Dutch Guard, is also a reference to this historical period.

In its second season, the team qualified for its first playoff match finishing at the top of the table. It played in the conference final against Hartford City FC on July 15. After regular time, the score was 1–1, and the game went into overtime. Michael Creswick scored the winning goal in the 94th minute, giving Stockade its first ever conference championship. On May 9, 2018, it played its first U.S. Open Cup game against the Long Island Rough Riders losing 6–3. On September 18, the club announced that head coach Lindholm stepped down from his position, citing "work in the athletic department at Bard College required his full dedication" with former captain, Jamal Lis-Simmons, named head coach on September 24, 2018.

On 31 July, 2024 Kingston Stockade, alongside Tulsa Athletic, Atlantic City FC, Napa Valley 1839 FC and FC Davis announced plans to launch a new soccer league in 2025, initially named The League for Clubs, and leaving the National Premier Soccer League.

== Record ==
=== Year-by-year ===
Year	Division	League	Stadium	Head Coach	Record	Regular season	Playoffs	U.S. Open Cup
2016	4	NPSL	Dietz Stadium	George Vizvary	5-8-3	7th, Atlantic Conference	did not qualify	Ineligible
2017	4	NPSL	Dietz Stadium	David Lindholm	7-4-1	1st, Atlantic White Conference	Regional semifinal	qualified
2018	4	NPSL	Dietz Stadium	David Lindholm	3-5-2	7th, North Atlantic Conference	did not qualify	did not qualify
2019	4	NPSL	Dietz Stadium	J. Lis-Simmons	7-3-4	3rd, North Atlantic Conference	did not qualify	did not qualify
2020	4	NPSL	Dietz Stadium	J. Lis-Simmons	—	Cancelled due to COVID-19		
2021	4	NPSL	Dietz Stadium	J. Lis-Simmons	5-1-4	3rd, North Atlantic Conference	Conference final	Cancelled due to Covid 19
2022	4	NPSL	Dietz Stadium	J. Lis-Simmons	2-5-3	5th, North Atlantic Conference	did not qualify	did not qualify
2023	4	NPSL	Tenney Stadium	J. Lis-Simmons	7-1-2	1st, North Atlantic Conference	Conference Final	did not qualify
2024	4	NPSL	Tenney Stadium	J. Lis-Simmons	2-7-1	5th, North Atlantic Conference	did not qualify	did not qualify
2025	4	TLC	Dietz Stadium	J. Lis-Simmons	5–1–5	3rd, North Division – Northeast Conference	Region Semifinals	did not qualify
2026	4	TLC	Dietz Stadium	J. Lis-Simmons	6–0–2	1st, North Division – Northeast Conference	Region Semifinals	did not enter

== Personnel ==
Management
Position	Name
Chairman	Dennis Crowley
Technical director	Dan Hoffay
Director of scouting	Nick Hoffay

Dan Hoffay was named Technical Director of Stockade FC on September 20, 2018, replacing departing general manager Randy Kim in that role. He had previously served as the team's player personnel director. Nick Hoffay was promoted to Director of Scouting on October 4, 2018, having previously served as the team's head scout. Dennis Crowley has served as chairman of Stockade FC since its founding in 2016.

Coaching staff
Position	Name
Head coach	Jamal Lis-Simmons

Jamal Lis-Simmons was hired as the 3rd head coach of Stockade FC on September 24, 2018. Lis-Simmons previously played for Stockade FC serving as captain since 2016. He replaced David Lindholm who stepped down from the club at the conclusion of the 2018 season. Lindholm served as coach for the 2017 and 2018 seasons, winning the NPSL Atlantic-White Conference in 2017. His predecessor was George Vizvary who coached one season with the team.

== All-time top scorers ==
As of May 19, 2018

Rank	Player	Position	Seasons played	Goals
1	**Michael Creswick**	FW	2016–2018	15
1	**Mateusz Koziol**	MF	2016–2018	13
2	**Pedro Espindola**	FW	2017–2018	11
4	**Eric Fortier**	FW	2016–2018	5
5	Corey Phillips	FW	2016	4
6	**Marco Kloster**	MF	2017–2018	3
7	Patrick Alvarez	MF	2016	2
7	**Matel Anasta**	DF	2016–2018	2
7	Anthony Barone	FW	2016	2
7	Matthew Daum	FW	2016	2
7	**Victor Guirma**	MF	2017–2018	2
7	**Bruce Jeter**	FW	2017–2018	2
7	**Jamal Lis-Simmons**	DF	2016–2018	2
7	**David Nkansah-Siriboe**	FW	2017–2018	2
7	Dylan Williams	MF	2016	2
7	**Scott Zobre**	FW	2016–2018	2
16	**Joe Bogart**	FW	2016–2018	1
16	**Mike Corbi**	FW	2017–2018	1
16	Brandon Curtis	MF	2017	1
16	**Josh Maley**	MF	2017–2018	1

Active players are marked in bold text.
