= 2026 WPSL season =

Women's Premier Soccer League
- Season: 2026
- Dates: May 9 – July 2 (regular season); July 17–19 (WPSL Championship)
- Champion: KC Current II (1st title)
- Matches: 611
- Goals: 2,315 (3.79 per match)
- Biggest home win: PEN 17–0 VAL (5/30)
- Biggest away win: MIL 0–18 TOR (6/17)
- Highest scoring: MIL 0–18 TOR (6/17)
- Longest winning run: PA Classic (8 wins)
- Longest unbeaten run: California Storm (11 matches)
- Longest losing run: Milwaukee City AFC (10 loses)
- All statistics correct as of 19:33, July 4, 2026 (UTC).

The 2026 Women's Premier Soccer League season is the 28th season of the WPSL. This season the WPSL will consist of 144 teams in 17 divisions in 16 conferences and 4 regions.

== Team changes ==
=== New teams ===
- Aggies FC
- Black Diamond FC
- Colorado Elevation FC
- CT Rush
- District Elite FC
- Fuego Femenil
- Future FC Women
- Glacier FC
- Inter Connecticut FC
- Kensington Soccer Club
- Legacy FC
- Little Rock Rangers SC
- Love City FC
- Miss Kick FC
- Missouri Rush
- Nevada Futbol Club
- San Francisco Glens SC
- Texas Lone Star S.C.
- The St. James Football Club
- Valdosta FC
- Vale SC
- Vermont Wild FC
- Yuba Football Club

=== Departing Teams ===
- AGC Football
- BC United
- Colorado Blizzard FC
- Corinthians FC of San Antonio
- Downtown United Soccer Club
- FC Birmingham Women
- FC Prime
- Florida Premier FC
- Florida Roots
- Fusion FC
- Futbolera Select
- Indios Denver FC
- Jacksonville Armada FC
- Jackson Ignite
- Kingston Capitals
- McLean Soccer
- MetaSport FC
- New York Shockers
- Peoria City
- PHX Heat FC
- Port City FC
- PSD Academy
- San Diego Strikers
- San Francisco Elite Soccer Club
- Seattle Reign FC II
- Seminole Ice
- SoCal Dutch Lions FC
- TLH Reckoning
- Utah Avalanche
- Utah Surf
- U.K. FC

== Standings ==
=== Central Region ===
==== Lake Shore Conference ====
Pos	Team	Pld	W	L	T	GF	GA	GD	Pts	PPG
1	FC Milwaukee Torrent	10	7	1	2	54	15	+39	23	2.30
2	Bavarian United SC	10	6	0	4	43	10	+33	22	2.20
3	Chicago House AC	10	7	2	1	28	7	+21	22	2.20
4	Chicago KICS Football Club	10	3	6	1	25	30	−5	10	1.00
5	Green Bay Glory	10	2	6	2	15	23	−8	8	0.80
6	Milwaukee City AFC	10	0	10	0	1	81	−80	0	0.00

Updated to match(es) played on July 1, 2026. Source: WPSL standings
Rules for classification: 1) Head-to-head based on total points; 2) Total wins; 3) Goal difference all league games; 4) Goals scored in league games

==== Lone Star Conference ====
Pos	Team	Pld	W	L	T	GF	GA	GD	Pts	PPG	Qualification
1	Austin Rise FC (Q)	8	6	1	1	23	5	+18	19	2.38	Conference Playoffs
2	FC Dallas	8	5	1	2	32	8	+24	17	2.13	
3	Fort Worth Vaqueras	8	2	3	3	11	14	−3	9	1.13	
4	SouthStar FC	8	2	5	1	9	23	−14	7	0.88	
5	Texas Lone Star S.C.	8	1	6	1	5	30	−25	4	0.50	

First match(es) will be played: July 2, 2026. Source: WPSL standings
Rules for classification: 1) Head-to-head based on total points; 2) Total wins; 3) Goal difference all league games; 4) Goals scored in league games
(Q) Qualified for the phase indicated

==== Midwest Conference ====
===== Gateway Division =====
Pos	Team	Pld	W	L	T	GF	GA	GD	Pts	PPG	Qualification
1	Lou Fusz Athletic (Q)	8	6	0	2	23	3	+20	20	2.50	Division Playoffs
2	Junction FC	8	5	3	0	18	12	+6	15	1.88	
3	FC Pride	8	3	3	2	17	9	+8	11	1.38	
4	Missouri Reign	8	2	4	2	10	17	−7	8	1.00	
5	Missouri Rush	8	0	6	2	4	31	−27	2	0.25	

Updated to match(es) played on June 27, 2026. Source: WPSL standings
Rules for classification: 1) Head-to-head based on total points; 2) Total wins; 3) Goal difference all league games; 4) Goals scored in league games
(Q) Qualified for the phase indicated

===== Heartland Division =====
Pos	Team	Pld	W	L	T	GF	GA	GD	Pts	PPG	Qualification
1	Kansas City Current II (C)	10	7	1	2	36	6	+30	23	2.30	Division Playoffs
2	Oklahoma City FC	10	7	3	0	21	10	+11	21	2.10	
3	Union KC	10	6	2	2	17	13	+4	20	2.00	
4	Sunflower State FC	10	4	5	1	23	20	+3	13	1.30	
5	Side FC 92	10	2	7	1	8	26	−18	7	0.70	
6	FC Wichita	10	1	9	0	8	38	−30	3	0.30	

Updated to match(es) played on June 27, 2026. Source: WPSL standings
Rules for classification: 1) Head-to-head based on total points; 2) Total wins; 3) Goal difference all league games; 4) Goals scored in league games
(C) Champions

===== Northern Conference =====
Pos	Team	Pld	W	L	T	GF	GA	GD	Pts	PPG	Qualification
1	Minnesota Thunder	8	7	1	0	27	3	+24	21	2.63	
2	Salvo SC (Q)	8	7	1	0	21	5	+16	21	2.63	Region Semifinals
3	St. Croix Soccer Club (Q)	8	4	2	2	14	10	+4	14	1.75	Region Semifinals
4	MN Bliss FC	8	4	4	0	14	13	+1	12	1.50	
5	Mankato United Soccer Club	8	3	5	0	12	14	−2	9	1.13	
6	Joy AC	8	2	4	2	6	16	−10	8	1.00	
7	Manitou F.C.	8	2	6	0	8	18	−10	6	0.75	
8	Minnesota Dutch Lions FC	8	1	7	0	4	27	−23	3	0.38	

Updated to match(es) played on July 1, 2026. Source: WPSL standings
Rules for classification: 1) Head-to-head based on total points; 2) Total wins; 3) Goal difference all league games; 4) Goals scored in league games
(Q) Qualified for the phase indicated

=== East Region ===
==== Great Lakes Conference ====
===== Great River Division =====
Pos	Team	Pld	W	L	T	GF	GA	GD	Pts	PPG	Qualification
1	FC Dayton	8	6	1	1	17	7	+10	19	2.38	
2	Columbus Eagles FC (Q)	8	6	2	0	28	6	+22	18	2.25	Conference Playoffs
3	Greater Toledo FC	8	4	4	0	11	16	−5	12	1.50	
4	Michigan Rangers	8	3	4	1	13	20	−7	10	1.25	
5	Corktown WFC	8	0	8	0	2	22	−20	0	0.00	

Updated to match(es) played on June 27, 2026. Source: WPSL standings
Rules for classification: 1) Head-to-head based on total points; 2) Total wins; 3) Goal difference all league games; 4) Goals scored in league games
(Q) Qualified for the phase indicated

===== Lake Erie Division =====
Pos	Team	Pld	W	L	T	GF	GA	GD	Pts	PPG
1	Internationals Soccer Club	8	7	1	0	34	8	+26	21	2.63
2	Beadling Soccer Club	8	5	3	0	14	6	+8	15	1.88
3	RNY FC	8	3	4	1	11	14	−3	10	1.25
4	Erie FC	8	2	4	2	7	25	−18	8	1.00
5	Niagara 1812	8	1	6	1	8	21	−13	4	0.50

Updated to match(es) played on June 28, 2026, 2026. Source: WPSL standings
Rules for classification: 1) Head-to-head based on total points; 2) Total wins; 3) Goal difference all league games; 4) Goals scored in league games

==== Metropolitan Conference ====
Pos	Team	Pld	W	L	T	GF	GA	GD	Pts	PPG	Qualification
1	New York Athletic Club (Q)	8	7	1	0	26	5	+21	21	2.63	Conference Playoffs
2	Clarkstown Soccer Club	8	5	2	1	25	9	+16	16	2.00	
3	Brooklyn City F.C.	8	5	3	0	16	8	+8	15	1.88	
4	STA	8	4	3	1	21	17	+4	13	1.63	
5	SUSA FC	8	2	4	2	10	22	−12	8	1.00	
6	Force FC New York	6	1	4	1	6	15	−9	4	0.67	
7	New York Dutch Lions FC	8	0	7	1	9	37	−28	1	0.13	

Updated to match(es) played on June 28, 2026. Source: WPSL standings
Rules for classification: 1) Head-to-head based on total points; 2) Total wins; 3) Goal difference all league games; 4) Goals scored in league games
(Q) Qualified for the phase indicated

==== Mid-Atlantic Conference ====
===== Colonial Division =====
Pos	Team	Pld	W	L	T	GF	GA	GD	Pts	PPG	Qualification
1	SJEB FC	8	7	0	1	20	8	+12	22	2.75	
2	Love City FC (Q)	8	5	0	3	19	11	+8	18	2.25	Division Playoffs
3	Penn Fusion SA	8	5	2	1	25	15	+10	16	2.00	
4	Real Central NJ	8	4	4	0	16	13	+3	12	1.50	
5	FC Monmouth	8	3	4	1	22	22	0	10	1.25	
6	Delaware Ospreys	8	3	4	1	17	20	−3	10	1.25	
7	Fever SC	8	2	6	0	16	28	−12	6	0.75	
8	Kensington Soccer Club	8	1	5	2	8	13	−5	5	0.63	
9	Philadelphia Ukrainian Nationals - Liberty	8	1	6	1	7	20	−13	4	0.50	

Updated to match(es) played on June 29, 2026. Source: WPSL standings
Rules for classification: 1) Head-to-head based on total points; 2) Total wins; 3) Goal difference all league games; 4) Goals scored in league games
(Q) Qualified for the phase indicated

===== Commonwealth Division =====
Pos	Team	Pld	W	L	T	GF	GA	GD	Pts	PPG	Qualification
1	PA Classics (Q)	8	7	0	1	29	7	+22	22	2.75	Division Playoffs
2	Reading United A.C.	8	5	1	2	20	9	+11	17	2.13	
3	Keystone FC	8	5	2	1	17	5	+12	16	2.00	
4	Hershey FC	8	2	5	1	9	18	−9	7	0.88	
5	West-Mont United	8	2	5	1	7	24	−17	7	0.88	
6	LVU Rush	8	1	4	3	5	17	−12	6	0.75	
7	Hex FC Tempest	8	1	6	1	12	19	−7	4	0.50	

Updated to match(es) played on June 26, 2026. Source: WPSL standings
Rules for classification: 1) Head-to-head based on total points; 2) Total wins; 3) Goal difference all league games; 4) Goals scored in league games
(Q) Qualified for the phase indicated

==== Northeastern Conference ====
Pos	Team	Pld	W	L	T	GF	GA	GD	Pts	PPG	Qualification
1	CT Rush (Q)	8	6	0	2	23	5	+18	20	2.50	Conference Playoffs
2	Rhode Island Rogues	8	6	2	0	21	7	+14	18	2.25	
3	Sporting CT	8	5	1	2	20	9	+11	17	2.13	
4	Merrimack Valley Hawks FC	8	4	3	1	20	13	+7	13	1.63	
5	Albany Rush	8	4	3	1	12	10	+2	13	1.63	
6	Vale SC	8	2	4	2	8	15	−7	8	1.00	
7	Vermont Wild FC	8	1	7	0	2	18	−16	3	0.38	
8	Inter Connecticut FC	8	0	8	0	2	31	−29	0	0.00	

Updated to match(es) played on July 2, 2026. Source: WPSL standings
Rules for classification: 1) Head-to-head based on total points; 2) Total wins; 3) Goal difference all league games; 4) Goals scored in league games
(Q) Qualified for the phase indicated

=== South Region ===
==== Atlantic Conference ====
===== Carolinas Division =====
Pos	Team	Pld	W	L	T	GF	GA	GD	Pts	PPG	Qualification
1	NCFC Navy (Q)	8	6	1	1	22	7	+15	19	2.38	Division Playoffs
2	Women's Football Club of Charlotte	8	6	1	1	20	10	+10	19	2.38	
3	Carolina FC	8	4	3	1	15	12	+3	13	1.63	
4	NCFC Grey	8	1	5	2	8	14	−6	5	0.63	
5	Soda City FC	8	0	7	1	3	25	−22	1	0.13	

Updated to match(es) played on June 27, 2026. Source: WPSL standings
Rules for classification: 1) Head-to-head based on total points; 2) Total wins; 3) Goal difference all league games; 4) Goals scored in league games
(Q) Qualified for the phase indicated

===== The District Division =====
Pos	Team	Pld	W	L	T	GF	GA	GD	Pts	PPG	Qualification
1	Arlington SA (Q)	8	6	1	1	19	7	+12	19	2.38	Conference Playoffs
2	Arlington SA U21	8	4	2	2	17	10	+7	14	1.75	
3	Alexandria Reds	8	4	3	1	10	12	−2	13	1.63	
4	The St. James Football Club	8	1	3	4	8	13	−5	7	0.88	
5	District Elite FC	8	0	6	2	6	18	−12	2	0.25	

Updated to match(es) played on June 27, 2026. Source: WPSL standings
Rules for classification: 1) Head-to-head based on total points; 2) Total wins; 3) Goal difference all league games; 4) Goals scored in league games
(Q) Qualified for the phase indicated

==== Gulf Coast Conference ====
===== Sunshine Division =====
Pos	Team	Pld	W	L	T	GF	GA	GD	Pts	PPG
1	West Florida Flames	6	6	0	0	44	4	+40	18	3.00
2	King's Hammer Swan City	8	3	3	2	20	17	+3	11	1.38
3	West Florida Flames Academy	6	2	2	2	10	12	−2	8	1.33
4	Bay City Reign	8	0	6	2	6	47	−41	2	0.25

Updated to match(es) played on June 27, 2026, 2026. Source: WPSL standings
Rules for classification: 1) Head-to-head based on total points; 2) Total wins; 3) Goal difference all league games; 4) Goals scored in league games

===== Third Coast Division =====
Pos	Team	Pld	W	L	T	GF	GA	GD	Pts	PPG	Qualification
1	Pensacola FC (Q)	10	9	0	1	70	3	+67	28	2.80	Division Playoffs
2	Legacy FC	10	7	3	0	21	23	−2	21	2.10	
3	Gulf Coast United	10	3	4	3	19	24	−5	12	1.20	
4	Union 10 FC	10	3	4	3	18	19	−1	12	1.20	
5	Pensacola FC Academy	10	2	4	4	16	22	−6	10	1.00	
6	Valdosta FC	10	0	9	1	9	62	−53	1	0.10	

Updated to match(es) played on June 28, 2026. Source: WPSL standings
Rules for classification: 1) Head-to-head based on total points; 2) Total wins; 3) Goal difference all league games; 4) Goals scored in league games
(Q) Qualified for the phase indicated

==== Mississippi Delta Conference ====
Pos	Team	Pld	W	L	T	GF	GA	GD	Pts	PPG	Qualification
1	Little Rock Rangers SC (Q)	10	9	0	1	40	3	+37	28	2.80	Division Playoffs
2	Shreveport United	10	5	2	3	23	13	+10	18	1.80	
3	LA Krew Rush	10	6	4	0	27	20	+7	18	1.80	
4	Mississippi Blues SC	10	3	4	3	14	13	+1	12	1.20	
5	Baton Rouge United	10	1	7	2	8	33	−25	5	0.50	
6	Hattiesburg FC	10	1	8	1	8	38	−30	4	0.40	

Updated to match(es) played on July 1, 2026. Source: WPSL standings
Rules for classification: 1) Head-to-head based on total points; 2) Total wins; 3) Goal difference all league games; 4) Goals scored in league games
(Q) Qualified for the phase indicated

==== Southeast Conference ====
Pos	Team	Pld	W	L	T	GF	GA	GD	Pts	PPG	Qualification
1	Georgia Impact (Q)	8	7	1	0	20	9	+11	21	2.63	Division Playoffs
2	865 Alliance	8	5	3	0	11	4	+7	15	1.88	
3	Nashville Rhythm F.C.	8	5	3	0	28	8	+20	15	1.88	
4	Decatur FC	8	4	2	2	22	8	+14	14	1.75	
5	Chattanooga FC	8	4	3	1	8	9	−1	13	1.63	
6	UFA Gunners	8	3	4	1	12	18	−6	10	1.25	
7	TN Tempo FC	8	1	6	1	4	34	−30	4	0.50	
8	Atlanta Fire United	8	0	7	1	6	21	−15	1	0.13	

Updated to match(es) played on July 2, 2026. Source: WPSL standings
Rules for classification: 1) Head-to-head based on total points; 2) Total wins; 3) Goal difference all league games; 4) Goals scored in league games
(Q) Qualified for the phase indicated

=== West Region ===
==== Desert Division ====
Pos	Team	Pld	W	L	T	GF	GA	GD	Pts	PPG
1	Royals AZ	10	8	2	0	31	7	+24	24	2.40
2	FC Tucson	10	6	3	1	16	23	−7	19	1.90
3	SC del Sol	10	5	4	1	29	12	+17	16	1.60
4	El Paso Surf	10	4	3	3	16	18	−2	15	1.50
5	Desert Dreams FC	10	2	7	1	10	24	−14	7	0.70
6	Arizona Arsenal Soccer Club	10	1	7	2	11	29	−18	5	0.50

Updated to match(es) played on June 28, 2026. Source: WPSL standings
Rules for classification: 1) Head-to-head based on total points; 2) Total wins; 3) Goal difference all league games; 4) Goals scored in league games

===== Rockies Division =====
Pos	Team	Pld	W	L	T	GF	GA	GD	Pts	PPG
1	Colorado Pride	8	5	2	1	17	8	+9	16	2.00
2	Northern Colorado Rain FC	8	4	1	3	12	7	+5	15	1.88
3	Aggies FC	8	4	2	2	13	11	+2	14	1.75
4	Colorado Elevation FC	8	2	4	2	9	13	−4	8	1.00
5	Glacier FC	8	0	6	2	8	20	−12	2	0.25

Updated to match(es) played on June 28, 2026. Source: WPSL standings
Rules for classification: 1) Head-to-head based on total points; 2) Total wins; 3) Goal difference all league games; 4) Goals scored in league games

===== Wasatch Division =====
Pos	Team	Pld	W	L	T	GF	GA	GD	Pts	PPG
1	Black Diamond FC	8	7	1	0	24	4	+20	21	2.63
2	La Roca FC	8	5	3	0	15	10	+5	15	1.88
3	Griffins FC	8	3	5	0	14	15	−1	9	1.13
4	City SC Utah	8	1	7	0	10	34	−24	3	0.38

Updated to match(es) played on June 26, 2026. Source: WPSL standings
Rules for classification: 1) Head-to-head based on total points; 2) Total wins; 3) Goal difference all league games; 4) Goals scored in league games

==== NorCal Conference ====
===== Central Valley Division =====
Pos	Team	Pld	W	L	T	GF	GA	GD	Pts	PPG	Qualification
1	San Francisco Nighthawks (Q)	8	5	2	1	22	10	+12	16	2.00	Conference Playoffs
2	Fuego Femenil	8	5	3	0	17	10	+7	15	1.88	
3	Lamorinda United	8	4	1	3	18	9	+9	15	1.88	
4	San Ramon FC	8	3	4	1	12	18	−6	10	1.25	
5	San Francisco Glens SC	8	2	3	3	14	17	−3	9	1.13	
6	The Town FC	8	2	4	2	19	21	−2	8	1.00	
7	Fresno Freeze	8	2	6	0	9	26	−17	6	0.75	

Updated to match(es) played on June 28, 2026. Source: WPSL standings
Rules for classification: 1) Head-to-head based on total points; 2) Total wins; 3) Goal difference all league games; 4) Goals scored in league games
(Q) Qualified for the phase indicated

===== Sacramento Valley Division =====
Pos	Team	Pld	W	L	T	GF	GA	GD	Pts	PPG	Qualification
1	California Storm (Q)	10	9	0	1	40	3	+37	28	2.80	Conference Playoffs
2	Iron Rose FC	9	5	2	2	25	10	+15	17	1.89	
3	Napa Valley 1839 FC	9	4	2	3	23	19	+4	15	1.67	
4	FC Davis	10	3	5	2	8	17	−9	11	1.10	
5	Yuba Football Club	10	2	7	1	10	25	−15	7	0.70	
6	Nevada Futbol Club	10	1	8	1	6	38	−32	4	0.40	

Updated to match(es) played on Updated after June 30, 2026. Source: WPSL standings
Rules for classification: 1) Head-to-head based on total points; 2) Total wins; 3) Goal difference all league games; 4) Goals scored in league games
(Q) Qualified for the phase indicated

==== PAC Northwest Conference ====
Pos	Team	Pld	W	L	T	GF	GA	GD	Pts	PPG	Qualification
1	Portland Thorns FC II	6	5	1	0	34	5	+29	15	2.50	
2	Spokane Shadow (Q)	6	5	1	0	17	10	+7	15	2.50	Conference Playoffs
3	Westside Metros FC	6	2	4	0	12	18	−6	6	1.00	
4	Vancouver Victory FC	6	0	6	0	1	31	−30	0	0.00	

Updated to match(es) played on July 1, 2026. Source: WPSL standings
Rules for classification: 1) Head-to-head based on total points; 2) Total wins; 3) Goal difference all league games; 4) Goals scored in league games
(Q) Qualified for the phase indicated

==== So Cal Conference ====
===== Coastal Division =====
Pos	Team	Pld	W	L	T	GF	GA	GD	Pts	PPG	Qualification
1	Miss Kick FC (Q)	8	6	1	1	16	8	+8	19	2.38	Conference Playoffs
2	FC Premier Women	8	5	2	1	18	11	+7	16	2.00	
3	Southern California Eagles	8	4	3	1	16	9	+7	13	1.63	
4	Beach Futbol Club	8	3	4	1	17	13	+4	10	1.25	
5	LA Surf Soccer Club	8	0	8	0	2	28	−26	0	0.00	

Updated to match(es) played on June 28, 2026. Source: WPSL standings
Rules for classification: 1) Head-to-head based on total points; 2) Total wins; 3) Goal difference all league games; 4) Goals scored in league games
(Q) Qualified for the phase indicated

===== Plymouth Division =====
Pos	Team	Pld	W	L	T	GF	GA	GD	Pts	PPG	Qualification
1	Rebels Soccer Club	8	5	2	1	19	9	+10	16	2.00	
2	So Cal Union FC (Q)	8	4	2	2	18	15	+3	14	1.75	Conference Playoffs
3	Future FC Women	8	4	3	1	16	18	−2	13	1.63	
4	ALBION San Diego	8	3	2	3	17	10	+7	12	1.50	
5	Prestige Football Club	8	0	7	1	8	26	−18	1	0.13	
6	San Diego Parceiro Ladies	0	0	0	0	0	0	0	0	—	

Updated to match(es) played on June 28, 2026. Source: WPSL standings
Rules for classification: 1) Head-to-head based on total points; 2) Total wins; 3) Goal difference all league games; 4) Goals scored in league games
(Q) Qualified for the phase indicated

== Playoffs ==
Conference play-offs July 1–3	Region Semifinals; July 11
CA	San Francisco Nighthawks	0
CA	California Storm	5
CA	California Storm	3
SoCal Conference; NorCal Conference
CA	So Cal Union FC	0
CA	MISS KICK FC	0
CA	So Cal Union FC	1
West Region
WA	Spokane Shadow	6
CA	San Francisco Nighthawks	0
MN	Salvo SC	3
MN	St. Croix Soccer Club	2
Central Region
TX	Austin Rise FC	0
Midwest Conference
MO	KC Current II	3
MO	Lou Fusz Athletic	1
MO	KC Current II	4
PA	PA Classics	4
PA	Love City FC	2
PA	PA Classics	3
Mid–Atlantic Conference
OH	Columbus Eagles FC	1
East Region
NY	New York Athletic Club	3
CT	CT Rush	1
GA	Georgia Impact	1
AR	Little Rock Rangers SC	0
South Region
FL	Pensacola FC	2(4)
Atlantic Conference
VA	Arlington SA	2(2)
NC	NCFC	0
VA	Arlington SA	7

Region finals July 12
CA	California Storm	8
WA	Spokane Shadow	0
MN	Salvo SC	0
MO	KC Current II	2
PA	PA Classics	2
NY	New York Athletic Club	8
GA	Georgia Impact	4
FL	Pensacola FC	0

National Semi–finals; July 18
CA	California Storm	0
MO	KC Current II	2
NY	New York Athletic Club	2
GA	Georgia Impact	1

National Final; July 19; Kansas City, MO
MO	KC Current II	1
NY	New York Athletic Club	0

== Awards ==
=== Team of the Week ===
Week	Conference	Club	Facts	Ref.
2	Great Lakes - Great River Division	FC Dayton	1–0 Victory over reigning division champions	
3	Northeastern Conference	RI Rogues FC	Defeated reigning league champions 3–0	
4	Third Coast Division	Legacy FC	Earning 5–3 win	
5	Southeast Conference	Georgia Impact	4–3 win over top–ranked Chattanooga Red Wolves	
6	Metropolitan Conference	New York Athletic Club	Broke Clarkstown Soccer Club 32 game regular season winning streak	
7	Southeast Conference	Nashville Rhythm FC	2–0 and 6–0 win	
8	Midwest Conference – Gateway Division	Junction FC	Won 4 of 5 games in six days	

=== Player of the Week ===
Week	Offensive player	Club	Stats	Ref.
Week	Defensive player	Club	Stats	Ref.
Week	Goalkeeper	Club	Stats	Ref.
1	(United States) Dalia Asad, MF	California Storm	Brace	
1	(United States) Hannah Roe, DF	Black Diamond FC	1 Goal, 1 Assist, 6 tackles	
1	(United States) Brooke Hancock, GK	West Florida Flames Academy	8 saves, clean sheet	
2	(United States) Rylee Lewis	Southern California Eagles	Brace	
2	(United States) Amalia Dray	Chicago House AC	9 defensive stops, won 10 duels	
2	(United States) Taylor Thomas	FC Dayton	6 saves, clean sheet	
3	(United States) Jenna Baumann, MF	Green Bay Glory	Brace, 4 assists	
3	(United States) Hannah Voskuhl	Oklahoma City FC	1 Goal	
3	(United States) Jessica Kasacek	RI Rogues FC	9 saves	
4	(United States) Ruby Hayward, FW	Royals AZ	1 goal, 1 assist	
4	(United States) Anna Buckwalter, MF	Reading United A.C.	1 win, 1 draw, 3 assists	
4	(United States) Allison Deardorff,, MF	Chicago House A.C.	11 saves, 2 clean sheets	
5	(United States) Reece Paget, FW	FC Monmouth	Hat Trick	
5	(United States) Ainsley Yates, DF	Carolina FC	1 goal, 1 assist	
5	(United States) Kennedy Zorn	SC del Sol	12 saves, 2 clean sheets	
6	(United States) Dylan Jovanovic, MF	New York Athletic Club	Hat trick, 4 goals over 2 games	
6	(United States) Brooklyn Bradley, DF	Black Diamond FC	1 goal, 4 duals, 5 ball recoveries	
6	(United States) Jaddah Foos	Georgia Impact	4 saves, clean sheet	
7	(United States) Marian Dunne, FW	Portland Thorns FC II	Contributed to 7 of 13 goals over 2 games	
7	(United States) Kelly Gerwitz	San Francisco Nighthawks	1 win	
7	(United States) Allison Nebelsick	Junction FC	3 saves, clean sheet	
8	(United States) Alexis Dendis	STA	5 goals, 1 assist over two games	
8	(United States) Brooke Gardner	Black Diamond FC	Division title	
8	(United States) Phoebe Carver	Arlington SA	4 saves, clean sheet	

=== All-National team ===
First team
Goalkeeper	Defenders	Midfielders	Forwards
(United States) Jaddah Foos(Georgia Impact)	(United States) Emily Smith (New York Athletic Club) (United States) Itala Gemelli, (KC Current II) (United States) Madison Ayson, (California Storm) (United States) Naila Schoefberger, (KC Current II) (United States) Nina Bodow, (New York Athletic Club)	(United States) Dylan Jovanovic (New York Athletic Club) (United States) Maggie Victor (Georgia Impact)	(United States) Avery Clark (KC Current II) (United States) Kaylen Crim (California Storm) (United States) Skylar Blaise (CK Current II)

=== All-Region teams ===
Central Region
Goalkeeper	Defenders	Midfielders	Forwards
(United States) Peyton Urban (Austin Rise FC)	(United States) Addi Van Zee (St. Croix Legacy) (United States) Fiona Skwierawski (Salvo SC) (United States) Itala Gemelli (KC Current II) (United States) Naila Schoefberger (KC Current II)	(United States) Avery Petty (Salvo SC) (United States) Sophia Bartjesteh (Salvo SC)	(United States) Avery Clark (KC Current II) (United States) Katie Gernsbacher (Austin Rise FC) (United States) Skylar Blaise (KC Current II) (United States) Sydney Sutherland (St. Croix Legacy)

East Region
Goalkeeper	Defenders	Midfielders	Forwards
N/A	(United States) Emily Smith (New York Athletic Club) (United States) Mackenzie Reid (CT Rush)	(United States) Dylan Jovanovic (New York Athletic Club) (United States) Joey Devlin (PA Classics) (United States) Katie Cox (Columbus Eagles FC) (United States) Lindsey Husic (PA Classics) (United States) Liza Suydam (PA Classics) (United States) Nikki Cox (Columbus Eagles FC) (United States) Victoria Vinals (New York Athletic Club)	(United States) Ari Mullin (CT Rush) (United States) Rachel Rouse (New York Athletic Club)

South Region
Goalkeeper	Defenders	Midfielders	Forwards
N/A	(United States) Amelie D’Agnillo (Arlington SA) (United States) Bela Labovic (Pensacola FC)	(United States) Ayla Ertekin (Pensacola FC) (United States) Grace Eatz (Georgia Impact) (United States) Elaine Farabaugh (Pensacola FC) (United States) Madison Hook (Georgia Impact)	(United States) Callie O’Connor (Georgia Impact) (United States) Ines Obradovac (Georgia Impact) (United States) Jama Akpanudo (Little Rock Rangers SC) (United States) Sara Daniel, (Little Rock Rangers SC) (United States) Valentina Barrera (Arlington SA)

West Region
Goalkeeper	Defenders	Midfielders	Forwards
(United States) Abbie Faingold (California Storm)	(United States) Amelia Villa (California Storm) (United States) McKenna Payne (So Cal Union FC) (United States) Madison Ayson (California Storm) (United States) Maleah Moore (Spokane Shadow)	(United States) Bella Flocchini (San Francisco Nighthawks) (United States) Sydney Grundland-Lanuza (San Francisco Nighthawks)	(United States) Brittany Brown (So Cal Union FC) (United States) Delani Walker (Spokane Shadow) (United States) Georgia Whitehead (Spokane Shadow) (United States) Kennedy Mayo, (California Storm)
