= Lukas Schubert (footballer) =

Austrian footballer

Personal information
- Full name: Lukas Schubert
- Date of birth: 25 June 1989 (age 37)
- Place of birth: Salzburg, Austria
- Position: Midfielder

Team information
- Current team: Napa Valley 1839

Senior career*
Years	Team	Apps	(Gls)
2008–2015	SV Grödig	128	(17)
2016–2017	Derry City	34	(5)
2018–	Napa Valley 1839	0	(0)
- * Club domestic league appearances and goals as of 10:17, 11 March 2017 (UTC)

Lukas Schubert (born 25 June 1989) is an Austrian footballer who currently plays for Napa Valley 1839 FC in the National Premier Soccer League. His career was interrupted in 2013 after suffering from a heart problem. After 21 months out he resumed playing football in July 2015.
