= 2027 U.S. Open Cup =

112th edition of cup competition in American soccer

2027 Lamar Hunt U.S. Open Cup
Tournament details
- Country: United States
- Dates: April 13 – December 15
- Teams: 96

The 2027 Lamar Hunt U.S. Open Cup will be the 112th edition of the U.S. Open Cup, the knockout domestic cup competition of American soccer, organized by the United States Soccer Federation. It will involve 96 teams, including teams from all three professional tiers of the United States soccer league system as well as amateur clubs. The competition will begin on April 13 and will culminate in the final on December 15.

The tournament will be the first since the 2023 U.S. Open Cup to feature all eligible MLS teams.

== Schedule ==
Schedule for 2027 Lamar Hunt U.S. Open Cup
Round	Draw date	Match day	Entrants	Teams entered to date
First Round		April 13–14, 20–21	29 USL Championship or USL League One teams 3 MLS Next Pro teams 32 Open Division teams	64 teams
Round of 64		July 8–11	32 winners from first round 27 Major League Soccer teams 5 USL Championship teams (Note: The five seeded USL Championship clubs entering in the Round of 64 are the Players' Shield winner, USL Championship Playoffs winner, Eastern Conference top seed, Western Conference top seed, and the Prinx Tires USL Cup champion.)	96 teams
Round of 32		September 14–15	32 winners from Round of 64	96 teams
Round of 16		TBC	16 winners from Round of 32	96 teams
Quarterfinals		November 23–24	8 winners from Round of 16	96 teams
Semifinals		December 1	4 winners from Quarterfinals	96 teams
Final		December 15	2 winners from Semifinals	96 teams

== Teams ==
=== Table ===
Enter in First Round				Enter in Round of 64	
Open Division		Division III	Division II		Division I
USASA/USSSA	NPSL/TLC/UPSL/USL2	MLS Next Pro/USL1	USL Championship		MLS
16 teams	16 teams	TBD teams (32 total teams between Division III/Division II: USL Championship, USL League One, and MLS Next Pro)	TBD teams (32 total teams between Division III/Division II: USL Championship, USL League One, and MLS Next Pro)	5 teams	27 teams
Local Qualifiers: CD Faialense (BSSL)	National Amateur Cup: El Farolito SC; Hank Steinbrecher Cup: Vermont Green FC; John Motta Trophy Winner: Asheville City SC; NPSL: Ambassadors FC Ohio; Bristol Rhythm AFC; Chicago Nation FC; New Haven United FC; TLC: Pensacola FC; UPSL: Bellevue Athletic FC; Deportivo Rose City; Miami United FC; Next Level Soccer Premier; NY Renegades FC; Philadelphia Lone Star FC; Pinellas County United Pelicans SC; SCU Heat; USL2: Akron City FC; Ballard FC; Colorado Storm; Laredo Heat; Little Rock Rangers; Minneapolis City SC; Ocean City Nor'easters; San Francisco City FC	MLS Next Pro: Carolina Core FC; Chattanooga FC; Connecticut United FC		Tampa Bay Rowdies (Players' Shield Winner); Louisville City FC (USL Cup winner); New Mexico United (Western Conference top seed); Sacramento Republic FC (USL Championship playoffs winner); TBD (Eastern Conference top seed) (Note: Since the Eastern Conference top seed (Tampa Bay Rowdies) also won the Players' Shield, the replacement team has yet to be confrimed.)	Atlanta United FC; Austin FC; Charlotte FC; Chicago Fire FC; FC Cincinnati; Colorado Rapids; Columbus Crew; FC Dallas; D.C. United; Houston Dynamo FC; Inter Miami CF; LA Galaxy; Los Angeles FC; Minnesota United FC; Nashville SC; New England Revolution; New York City FC; New York Red Bulls; Orlando City SC; Philadelphia Union; Portland Timbers; Real Salt Lake; St. Louis City SC; San Diego FC; San Jose Earthquakes; Seattle Sounders FC; Sporting Kansas City

=== Map ===
Locations of teams in the tournament proper.
- MLS
- USLC
- Division 3 (MLSNP/USL1)
- Open Division (NPSL/TLC/UPSL/USL2)
- Open Division (USASA/USSSA)
- Multiple Teams

Metro areas with multiple teams:

- Boston: New England Revolution (MLS), CD Faialense (BSSL)
- Chicago: Chicago Fire FC (MLS), Chicago Nation FC (NPSL)
- Denver: Colorado Rapids (MLS), Colorado Storm (USL2)
- Los Angeles: LA Galaxy (MLS), Los Angeles FC (MLS)
- Miami: Inter Miami CF (MLS), Miami United FC (UPSL)
- Minneapolis: Minnesota United FC (MLS), Minneapolis City SC (USL2)
- New York City: New York City FC (MLS), New York Red Bulls (MLS), NY Renegades FC (UPSL)
- Philadelphia: Philadelphia Union (MLS), Philadelphia Lone Star FC (UPSL)
- Portland: Portland Timbers (MLS), Deportivo Rose City (UPSL)
- San Francisco Bay Area: San Jose Earthquakes (MLS), El Farolito SC (NPSL), San Francisco City FC (USL2)
- Seattle: Seattle Sounders FC (MLS), Ballard FC (USL2), Bellevue Athletic FC (UPSL)
- Tampa Bay: Tampa Bay Rowdies (USLC), Pinellas County United Pelicans SC (UPSL)
- Washington D.C.: D.C. United (MLS), TBD (Yinz United/DC Hyper)
