= 2019 GCPL season =

Gulf Coast Premier League
- Season: 2019
- Matches: 94
- Goals: 399 (4.24 per match)
- Top goalscorer: Roger Llergo
- Highest attendance: 1126
- Lowest attendance: 38
- All statistics correct as of August 1st, 2019.

The 2019 Gulf Coast Premier League season was the 4th season of the GCPL. FC New Orleans won the playoffs after beating Northshore United in the final.

== Team changes ==
=== Incoming teams ===
Team	Location	Notes
Tallahassee SC	Tallahassee, FL	Expansion team
Louisiana Krewe FC	Lafayette, LA	Expansion team
Hattiesburg FC	Hattiesburg, MS	Expansion team
FC New Orleans	New Orleans, LA	Joined in 2019

=== Outgoing teams ===
Team	Location	Notes
Real United FC	Moss Point, MS	Not listed

== Standings ==
=== West Division ===
Pos	Team	Pld	W	L	T	GF	GA	GD	Pts	Qualification
1	Boca Knights FC	10	6	1	3	27	14	+13	21	2019 GCPL playoffs
2	Louisiana Krewe FC	10	6	2	2	22	8	+14	20	2019 GCPL playoffs
3	Alexandria FC	10	5	3	2	28	18	+10	17	
4	Cajun SC	10	4	5	1	16	14	+2	13	
5	Central Texas Lobos	10	3	6	1	19	24	−5	10	
6	Shreveport United	10	1	8	1	10	44	−34	4	

Updated to match(es) played on unknown. Source: 2019 GCPL standings
Rules for classification: 1) points; 2) head to head results; 3) goal differential in head to head results; 4) wins; 5) total goal differential; 6) fewest losses; 7) coin toss

=== Central Division ===
Pos	Team	Pld	W	L	T	GF	GA	GD	Pts	Qualification
1	Northshore United	10	7	2	1	20	12	+8	22	2019 GCPL playoffs
2	FC New Orleans	10	6	1	3	42	13	+29	21	2019 GCPL playoffs
3	Motagua New Orleans	10	7	3	0	41	17	+24	21	
4	Gaffa FC	10	5	3	2	24	17	+7	17	
5	Baton Rouge United	10	1	9	0	16	45	−29	3	
6	Mississippi Blues SC	10	1	9	0	8	47	−39	3	

Source: 2019 GCPL standings
Rules for classification: 1) points; 2) head to head results; 3) goal differential in head to head results; 4) wins; 5) total goal differential; 6) fewest losses; 7) coin toss

=== East Division ===
Pos	Team	Pld	W	L	T	GF	GA	GD	Pts	Qualification
1	Tallahassee SC	9	5	1	3	16	7	+9	18	2019 GCPL Playoffs
2	AFC Mobile	10	6	2	2	23	15	+8	20	2019 GCPL Playoffs
3	Port City FC	9	4	4	1	17	18	−1	13	
4	Gulf Coast Rangers	10	3	4	3	17	24	−7	12	
5	Hattiesburg FC	10	3	6	1	14	15	−1	10	
6	Pensacola FC	10	2	6	2	24	32	−8	8	

Updated to match(es) played on unknown. Source: 2019 GCPL standings
Rules for classification: 1) points; 2) head to head results; 3) goal differential in head to head results; 4) wins; 5) total goal differential; 6) fewest losses; 7) coin toss

== Playoffs ==
Quarterfinals
W2	Louisiana Krewe FC	4
E1	Tallahassee SC	3
W1	Boca Knights FC	2
E2	AFC Mobile	0

Semifinals
C2	FC New Orleans	4
W1	Boca Knights FC	0
C1	Northshore United	1
W2	Louisiana Krewe FC	0

Final
C2	FC New Orleans	1
C1	Northshore United	0

Note: FC New Orleans and Northshore United entered at the semi-finals stage.

== Statistics ==
=== Top Scorers ===
Rank	Player	Club	Goals
1	Oscar Saavedra	Central Texas Lobos	9
1	Adrian Rodriguez	Louisiana Krewe FC	9
1	Roger Llergo	FC New Orleans	9
2	Quesi Weston	Boca Knights FC	8
3	Jesus Benitez	FC New Orleans	7

=== Top assists ===
Rank	Player	Club	Assists
1	Dril Mboungou	Alexandria FC	7
1	Samir Arzú	Motagua New Orleans	7
2	Roger Llergo	FC New Orleans	6
2	Huber Lopez	FC New Orleans	6
2	Tilman Schober	AFC Mobile	6
