= Tyler FC =

- Full name: Tyler Football Club
- Nickname: The Kings
- Founded: December 8, 2016; 9 years ago
- Stadium: Kings Park (Bristo Field)
- Capacity: 1,000
- President: Christopher Avila
- Vice President: Jason Martinez
- Head Coach: Chris Avila
- League: NPSL, UPSL
- Inaugural Season: 2017
- Website: tylerfootballclub.com
| Home colours | Away colours |

Tyler Football Club is a semi-pro American soccer club based in Tyler, Texas that plays in the National Premier Soccer League (NPSL) and United Premier Soccer League (UPSL), both who are fourth tier of the American soccer pyramid.

== History ==
The club was announced as an expansion team by the National Premier Soccer League on December 8, 2016. The club is led by President Christopher Avila a native to Tyler, TX and Vice President Jason Martinez. 2017-2018 was a rough beginning for the club as Tyler FC tried to find their identity in style of play. 2019 was a breakthrough season as higher level recruits came through and players who played in previous seasons began to gain experience playing in the NPSL. In the fall of 2019 Tyler FC joined 4th division UPSL, joining up in the Red River Conference (2nd tier UPSL). After a successful inaugural season in the UPSL 2nd tier, Tyler FC managed to score 49 goals and place 2nd in the nation for most goals scored. Although they did not win their conference they managed to go get promoted to 1st tier UPSL after a breakthrough season.

== Year-by-year ==
| Year | Division | League | Position | Playoffs | Open Cup | Avg. attendance |
|---|---|---|---|---|---|---|
| 2017 | 4th | NPSL | 6th, Lone Star Conference | Did not qualify | Did not qualify | 427 |
| 2018 | 4th | NPSL | 6th, Lone Star Conference | Did not qualify | Did not qualify | 315 |
| 2019 | 4th | NPSL | 5th, Lone Star Conference | Did not qualify | Did not qualify | 235 |
| 2019 (Fall) | 4th | UPSL | 2nd, North Texas | Promoted to 1st | Did not qualify | 260 |
| 2025 | 4th | TLC | 9th, Texas Conference | Did not qualify | Did not qualify | 260 |

== Head coaches ==
- (United States) Christopher Avila & Jason Martinez (2017)
- (Mexico) Demetrio Hernadez & Jason Martinez (2018)
- (France) Devy Desiree & Karl Messniere (2019 Spring)
- (United States) Christopher Avila, Jason Martinez & Sergio Gardea (2019 Fall-Current)

== Stadium ==
- Herrington Stadium; Tyler, Texas (2017)
- Kings Park; Chandler, Texas (2018-Current)
