= Tallahassee SC =

- Full name: Tallahassee Soccer Club
- Nickname: The Battle Lions
- Founded: May 3, 2018; 8 years ago
- Ground: Gene Cox Stadium
- Capacity: 5,500
- Head coach: Joel Di Castri
- League: The League for Clubs
- [[]]: 2nd. of East Division; Playoffs: Lost on semifinals
- Website: battle-lions.com
colors

Tallahassee Soccer Club is an American soccer club based in Tallahassee, Florida that competes in The League for Clubs.

== History ==
Tallahassee SC was founded on May 3, 2018, by residents of Tallahassee, FL, Leon County, FL including Chris Petley, Mike Bonfanti and 4 others looking to bring a semi-professional soccer team to Tallahassee.

In February 2019, Josh Bruno was named as the first head coach of the team. The club played its first ever match against Savannah Clovers FC on May 4, 2019, in front of over 600 fans at the FSU Intramural Fields.

Tallahassee Soccer Club GK Hugo Peruzzi was named GCPL Eastern Conference MVP and coach Josh Bruno selected Coach of the Year after TLHSC won the conference in its inaugural season. Additionally, Tallahassee SC had the most players selected to the East's Best XI team. Joining Peruzzi was forward Boneco Bazil and midfielders Johnny Fitzgerald and Aron Wimberly.

Hugo Peruzzi, along with Lev Ari from Mobile F.C., were the only players from the Eastern Conference picked up for the ALL-CONFERENCE BEST XI GCPL 2019.

On November 12, 2019, it was announced that Tallahassee SC would join the National Premier Soccer League in a newly formed Gulf Coast Conference that featured Tallahassee, Port City FC, AFC Mobile, Pensacola FC, and NPSL mainstays the New Orleans Jesters and Jacksonville Armada. Tallahassee SC departed the NPSL after the 2024 season and began play in the South region of The League for Clubs in the 2025 season.

== Supporters ==
Tallahassee has an established local fanbase, including a supporter group known as the Olde Fields Battalion. The name references the meaning of “Tallahassee” in the Muskogee language, spoken by the Seminole and Creek peoples. The group is typically located in the lower section of the Main Stand at Gene Cox Stadium and participates in pre-game and post-game gatherings, as well as attending local festivals in association with the team.

== Head coaches ==
- (United States) Josh Bruno (2019-2022)
- (United Kingdom) Joel Di Castri (2022-Current)

== Coaching staff ==
(Updated April 14, 2024)

Position	Name
Assistant Coach	Bryan McDonald
Assistant Coach	Mason Solari
Assistant Coach, Goalkeepers	Augustin Vilardo
Assistant Coach, Strikers	Josh Bruno
Strength and Conditioning	Anthony Vazquez

== Stadium ==
- Gene Cox Stadium; Tallahassee, Florida (2021-Current)
- Florida State University Main Sports Complex; Tallahassee, Florida (2019–2020)

== Results ==
=== Year-by-year ===
(Last updated July 28, 2025)

Season	League	Div.	Pos.	Pl.	W	D	L	GF	GA	GD	Pts.	Playoffs
2019	GCPL	East	1st	9	5	1	3	16	7	+9	18	did not qualify
2020	COVID-19											
2021	NPSL	Gulf Coast Conference	7th	14	3	4	7	17	29	-12	13	did not qualify
2022	NPSL	Gulf Coast Conference	7th	12	0	2	10	12	38	-26	2	did not qualify
2023	NPSL	Gulf Coast Conference	4th	10	3	5	2	14	14	0	14	did not qualify
2024	NPSL	Gulf Coast Sunshine Conference	5th	10	4	2	4	17	18	-1	14	did not qualify
2025	TLC	East Division – Gulf Coast Conference	2nd	10	8	1	1	43	8	+35	25	Conference Semifinals
