= AFC Mobile =

American soccer club

- Full name: Association Football Club Mobile
- Nicknames: Azaleas, Wanderers
- Founded: June 15, 2015; 11 years ago
- Ground: Davidson High School Stadium, Mobile, AL
- Head Coach: Sam Rehm
- League: The League for Clubs
- Website: afcmobile.net
Home colors

AFC Mobile is an American soccer club based in Mobile, Alabama, that formerly competed in the National Premier Soccer League. After a hiatus, the club returned to the Gulf Coast Premier League for the 2024 season, and currently competes in The League for Clubs.

== History ==
=== Founding ===
AFC Mobile was founded in 2015 by Mobile and Baldwin County, Alabama, soccer enthusiasts in order to establish a semi-professional soccer team in the City of Mobile. It was announced on January 3, 2017, that AFC Mobile would join the Gulf Coast Premier League for its inaugural Summer Season. On November 12, 2019, it was announced that AFC Mobile would join the National Premier Soccer League in a newly formed Gulf Coast Conference that featured Mobile, Port City FC, Tallahassee SC, Pensacola FC, and NPSL mainstays the New Orleans Jesters and Jacksonville Armada.

=== Inaugural season ===
Prior to their debut season, AFC Mobile announced that it would play its inaugural season's home games at the Archbishop Lipscomb Athletic Complex, located in the Bolton neighborhood of Mobile. For its first two years, the team was managed by Nate Nicholas, a former player for the University of Mobile, former back-to-back state championship-winning coach at UMS-Wright Preparatory School, and current varsity men's coach at McGill–Toolen Catholic High School.

=== Changes to coaching staff ===
After finishing the 2018 GCPL season, head coach Nate Nicholas stepped down.

Ultimately, Spring Hill College's men's soccer coach Steve Wieczorek was named as Nicholas's replacement on January 7, 2019.

== Support ==
=== Rivalries ===
Mobile's main rival is Union 10, who are based across Mobile Bay in Daphne, Alabama. The matches between these two clubs are referred to as the 251 Derby.

AFC had a rivalry with Port City FC (formerly Biloxi City FC), who played in Gulfport, Mississippi when both clubs participated in the GCPL. They competed for the fan-based Forgotten Coast Cup.

=== Attendance ===
For their debut game on May 14, 2017, AFC Mobile more than quadrupled the highest ever attendance for the Gulf Coast Premier League. In their second home game on June 10, 2017 against Biloxi City FC, AFC Mobile drew 924 to Archbishop Lipscomb Stadium, which topped the league's previous record. On June 8, 2017, AFC Mobile became the first team in the Gulf Coast Premier League to break 1,000 people in attendance against CD Motagua of New Orleans.

During their second season, AFC Mobile would go on to draw over 1,400 fans twice against the Gulf Coast Rangers and Port City FC.

== Coaching staff ==
=== Team management ===
Coaching Staff
Head coach	(United States) Sam Rehm

== Year-by-year ==
Year	Conference	League	Regular Season	Playoffs	Open Cup
2017	Eastern Conference	GCPL	6th, East	did not qualify	did not enter
2018	Eastern Conference	GCPL	4th, East	did not qualify	did not enter
2019	Eastern Conference	GCPL	2nd, East	Quarterfinals	did not enter
2020	Gulf Coast Conference	NPSL	Season cancelled due to COVID-19 pandemic		did not enter
2025	Gulf Coast Conference	TLfC	9th, Gulf Coast	did not qualify	did not enter
