= Austin United FC =

American association football team

- Nickname: Armadillos
- Founded: 2017; 9 years ago
- Ground: Veterans Stadium
- Capacity: 4,400
- Owner: Orlando Medrano
- Manager: Jerry Emmanuel
- Coach: Eric Embry
- League: The League for Clubs
- 2025: 2nd. of Texas Conference; Playoffs: Finalist
Home colors

Austin United FC, also known as The Armadillos, is a semi-professional American soccer team in Austin, Texas. The team plays in the National Premier Soccer League (NPSL), as part of the league's South Region's Lone Star Conference.

== History ==
The team was founded in 2017 by Orlando Medrano, and played its first season in the NPSL in 2020.The team participated in regional competitions for two years before joining the NPSL in 2020. In November 2024, it was announced that Austin United would be joining The League for Clubs for the 2025 season.

== Management team ==
Position	Name
Owner	(Mexico) Orlando Medrano
General manager	(United States) Eric Embry
NPSL and U-20 coach	(United States) Eric Embry
U-20 Girls' coach	(Mexico) Larissa Villarruel
Academy coach	(Honduras) Nelson E Sorto

== Year-by-year ==
Season	League											Position		Playoffs	U.S. Open Cup
Season	League	Conference	Pld	W	L	D	GF	GA	GD	Pts	PPG	Conf.	Overall	Playoffs	U.S. Open Cup
2020	NPSL	Lone Star	Cancelled due to COVID-19												
2021	NPSL	Lone Star	On hiatus												
2022	NPSL	Lone Star	12	1	10	1	16	44	–28	4	0.33	9th	27th	DNQ	DNE
2023	NPSL	Lone Star	11	2	7	2	13	23	–10	8	0.73	8th	76th	DNQ	DNE
2024	NPSL	Lone Star	10	2	7	1	14	24	–10	7	0.70	7th	66th	DNQ	DNE
2025	TLC	Texas	10	7	1	2	32	13	+19	23	2.30	2nd	N/A	Conference finals	DNE
Total			43	12	25	6	75	104	–29	42	0.98	-	-	-	-

Notes

- DNQ = Did not qualify
- DNE = Did not enter

== See also ==
- Austin Lightning
- Austin Thunder
- Austin Lone Stars
- Austin Aztex
- Austin Aztex U23
- Austin Bold FC
- Austin FC
- Austin FC II
