= Napa Valley 1839 FC =

- Full name: Napa Valley 1839 Football Club
- Founded: December 21, 2016; 9 years ago
- Stadium: Dodd Stadium
- Owners: Arik Housley; Josh Goss
- Head coach: Mark Corbett
- League: The League for Clubs; Women's Premier Soccer League
- 2025: 3rd. of NorCal Conference; Playoffs: National runners-up
- Website: napavalley1839.com
Home colors	Away colors

Napa Valley 1839 FC is a men's and women's soccer club based in Napa, California. The men compete in The League for Clubs West Region, NorCal Conference. The women compete in the Women's Premier Soccer League. The club's colors are green and white.

== History ==
Napa Valley 1839 FC was founded in 2016 by Josh Goss, Arik Housley, Jonathan Collura, and Michael Hitchcock, joining NPSL's Golden Gate Conference as an expansion team. The team is affiliated with Napa United, a youth organization.

== Coaching staff ==
=== Coaching staff ===
- Rogelio Ochoa, Head Coach
- Ivan Hernandez, Assistant Coach

=== Front office ===
- (United States) Josh Goss – co-owner
- (United States) Arik Housley – co-owner
- (United States) Jonathan Collura – co-owner
- (United States) Michael Hitchcock – co-owner
- (United States) Chris Salese – co-owner
- (United States) Josh Goss – General Manager
- (United States) Peter Weber – Marketing Director

== Record ==
=== Men's team ===
Year	League	Regular season	Playoffs	U.S. Open Cup	Notes
2017	NPSL	5th, Golden Gate Conference	did not qualify	Ineligible	
2018	NPSL	7th, Golden Gate Conference	did not qualify	did not qualify	
2019	NPSL	6th, Golden Gate Conference	did not qualify	did not qualify	
2020	NPSL	Season cancelled due to COVID-19 pandemic			
2021	NPSL	Season cancelled due to COVID-19 pandemic			
2022	NPSL	3rd, Golden Gate Conference	Conference semi-finals	did not qualify	
2023	NPSL	2nd, Golden Gate Conference	Conference finals	did not qualify	
2024	NPSL	2nd, Golden Gate Conference	Conference finals	did not qualify	
2025	TLC	3rd, NorCal Conference	Runner up	Second qualifying round	
2026	TLC			Second qualifying round	

=== Tournament results ===
- 2019 NPSL Members Cup: 6th, 1-1-8 (4 pts)

=== Women's team ===
Year	League	Regular season	Playoffs
2022	WPSL	6th, Group F	did not qualify
2023	WPSL	6th, West Pac North	did not qualify
2024	WPSL	6th, Pac North	did not qualify
2025	WPSL	8th, NorCal Conference	did not qualify
2026	WPSL	3rd, Sacramento Valley Division	did not qualify

== Honors ==
- Men's Team
  - Wine Country Derby champion (1): 2019
