= Atlantic City FC =

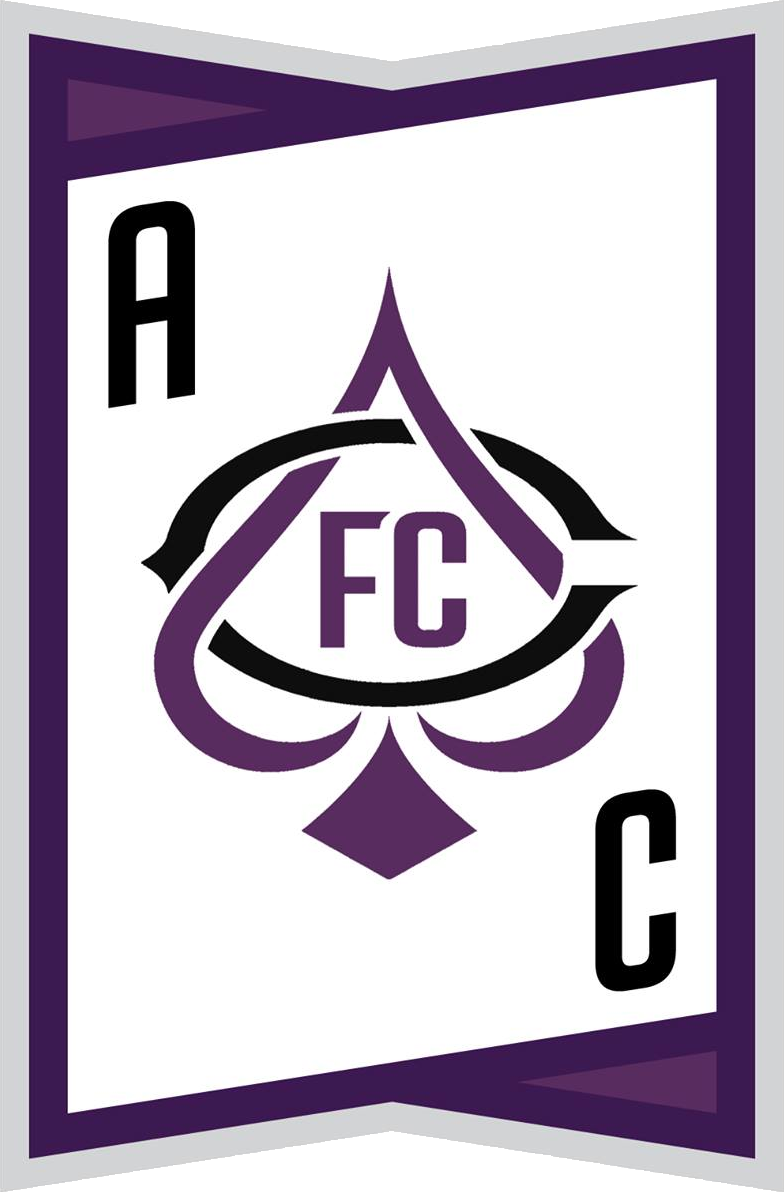
- Full name: Atlantic City Football Club
- Nickname: Aces
- Founded: 2017; 9 years ago
- Stadium: Stockton University
- Capacity: 1,500
- Owners: Andrew Weilgus & Nicholas Bilotta
- League: NPSL
- Website: atlanticcityfc.com
Home colors	Away colors

Atlantic City Football Club (ACFC) is an American soccer team based in Atlantic City, New Jersey, United States. Founded in 2017, the team plays in the TLFC . The Club is headquartered inside Tilton Fitness Atlantic City at the Tropicana Hotel and Casino The team uses Stockton University's Soccer Stadium in Galloway for home matches. The team's colors are purple, black and white.

== History ==
ACFC was officially announced as an expansion side in the NPSL on December 21, 2017.” Shortly after, former Swansea City player Kristian O'Leary was appointed Head Coach. The team played its first season at Stockton University. In 2023, the team announced a return to Stockton University as the full-time home of the team, starting with 5 games in 2023.

== Records ==
=== Year-by-year ===
Year	Division	League	Regular season	Playoffs	U.S. Open Cup	Avg. attendance
2018	4	NPSL	6th, Keystone Conference	did not qualify	—	313
2019	4	NPSL	1st, Keystone Conference	Conference Semifinal	qualified	408
2020	4	NPSL	Season cancelled due to COVID-19 pandemic			
2021	4	NPSL	2nd, Keystone Conference	Conference Semifinal	did not qualify	—
2022	4	NPSL	9th, Keystone Conference	did not qualify	did not qualify	—
2023	4	NPSL	2nd, Keystone Conference	Conference Final	did not qualify	—
2024	4	NPSL	3rd, Keystone East Conference	did not qualify	did not qualify	—
2025	4	TLC	1st, South Division – Northeast Conference	Region Finals	did not qualify	—
2026	4	TLC	1st, South Division – Northeast Conference	Region Finals	did not qualify	—

== Coaching staff ==
Position	Name
Head coach	Andrew Catalana
Technical director	Alex Balog
Sporting director	Alexis Mendoza
Assistant coach	Chad Catalana
Assistant coach	Matt Stellitano
Team doctor	Dr. Damon Greene

== Club Officials ==
Position	Name
Owner & president	Andrew Weilgus
Owner & chief operating officer	Nicholas Bilotta
Media director	Paul Kelly
General manager	Jim Bohs
