= Foro SC =

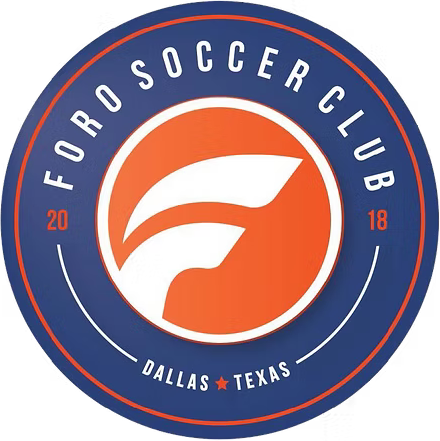
- Full name: Foro Soccer Club
- Founded: 2017 (as Keene FC)
- Ground: Foro Sports Club; Dallas, Texas
- President: Robert Peinado Jr.
- General manager: Kristian Quintana
- Head coach: Michel Garbini Pereira
- League: The League for Clubs
- 2025: 7th of Texas Conference (not qualified)
- Website: forosportsclub.com/soccer
Home colours

Foro SC (stylized as FORO SC) is an American soccer club based in Dallas, Texas. The club plays in the Central Region's Texas North Conference in the United Premier Soccer League, a national amateur league that competes below the three professional tiers of American soccer.

== History ==
Keene FC was founded in late 2017 by Brentt Miller and Matt Kahla based out of Keene, Texas. The team was announced as a United Premier Soccer League expansion side in November of that year, with plans to begin play in the Pro Premier DIvision Central Conference for the 2018 Spring Season. The team finished its first season last (6th) in the North Division of the Central Conference, winning zero games while losing six of eight in the regular season. Ahead of the Fall season, former MLS All-Star José Burciaga Jr. was brought on as team General Manager.

In December 2018, following two seasons of play, the team announced it would be going on hiatus as it attempted to rebrand and relocate. In July 2019, the UPSL welcomed FORO Soccer Club out of Dallas, Texas as a new member of the Central Conference. Michel Garbini Pereira, former North Texas SC player and current assistant head coach, was announced as the team's new head coach. The team's first season under the new name saw it win the Central Conference's North Division for a first time with a near undefeated record. Foro reached the national final four, beating Santa Ana Winds FC in the semifinals but falling to Maryland Bobcats FC is the championship game. Following stoppages of play in 2020 due to COVID-19 the team returned to play and soon after formed a partnership with the 360 Player Development Program, rebranding the team to FORO 360 Pro in the process. During this period, the team won the UPSL National Championship in February 2022 with former USMNT U-18 player Miles Byass scoring the game winning goal over Chicago Nation FC in the final. In January 2023, the team reverted back to Foro SC.

Foro competed in U.S. Open Cup qualifying for the first time in the fall of 2023. The team beat fellow UPSL side Alamo City SC in the fourth qualifying round to officially clinch a spot in the 2024 U.S. Open Cup. In the First Round of the tournament proper, FORO earned its first win over a professional team when it beat Austin FC II of MLS Next Pro, 2–2 (3–4 in penalty kicks).

The following year in 2024, Foro once again took part in the U.S. Open Cup qualifying tournament.

=== Year-by-year ===
Year	League	Division	Regular season (WDL)	Playoffs	U.S. Open Cup	Notes
Spring 2018	UPSL	Pro Premier	6th, Central Conference - North Div. (0-2-6)	Did not qualify	Ineligible	
Fall 2018	UPSL	Pro Premier	5th, Central Conference - North Div. (4-1-7)	Did not qualify	Did not enter qualifying	
Spring 2019	did not compete					
Fall 2019	UPSL	Premier	1st, Central Conference - North Div. (9-0-1)	National Final	Did not enter qualifying	Lost to Maryland Bobcats FC in National Final
Spring 2020	UPSL	Premier	2nd, Central Conference - North Div. (5-0-3)	Conference Semifinal	Did not qualify	Lost to FC Harrington in Central Conference Semifinal
Fall 2020	UPSL	Premier	2nd, Central Conference - North Div. (10-2-2)	Round of 16	Cancelled	Lost to Tulsa Athletic Project 2020 in Central Conference, North Division Final; Lost to Capital City SC in National Round of 16
Spring 2021	did not compete					
Fall 2021	UPSL	Premier	1st, Central Conference - North Div. (8-1-3)	National Champion	Did not enter qualifying	Beat Chicago Nation FC in National Final
Spring 2022	UPSL	Premier	3rd, Texas North (7-0-3)	Conference Semifinal	Did not qualify	Lost to FC Fort Worth in Texas North Semifinal
Fall 2022	UPSL	Premier	1st, Texas North (8-1-1)	Conference Final	Did not enter qualifying	Lost to D'Feeters Kicks SC in Texas North Final
Spring 2023	UPSL	Premier	2nd, Texas North (6-1-3)	Conference Final	Did not qualify	Lost to D'Feeters Kicks SC in Texas North Final
Fall 2023	UPSL	Premier	1st, Texas North (7-2-0)	National Semifinals (Fourth Place)	Qualified	Lost to Chiriaco FC in National Semifinal; Lost to Columbus Crew Academy in Third Place match
Spring 2024	UPSL	Premier	1st, Texas North (6-2-2)	Round of 32	Second Round	Lost to FC Bartlesville Buffaloes in National Round of 32
Fall 2024	UPSL	Premier	1st, Texas North (8–0-2)	Round of 32	Qualified	Lost to GFI Academy in National Round of 32
Spring 2025	UPSL	Premier	1st, Texas North (8–0-2)	Conference Final	Second Round	Lost to Balboa FC in Texas North Final
2025	The League for Clubs	Texas Conference	7th	Did not qualify	Second Round	
2026					1st Qualifying Round	
