= FC Monmouth =

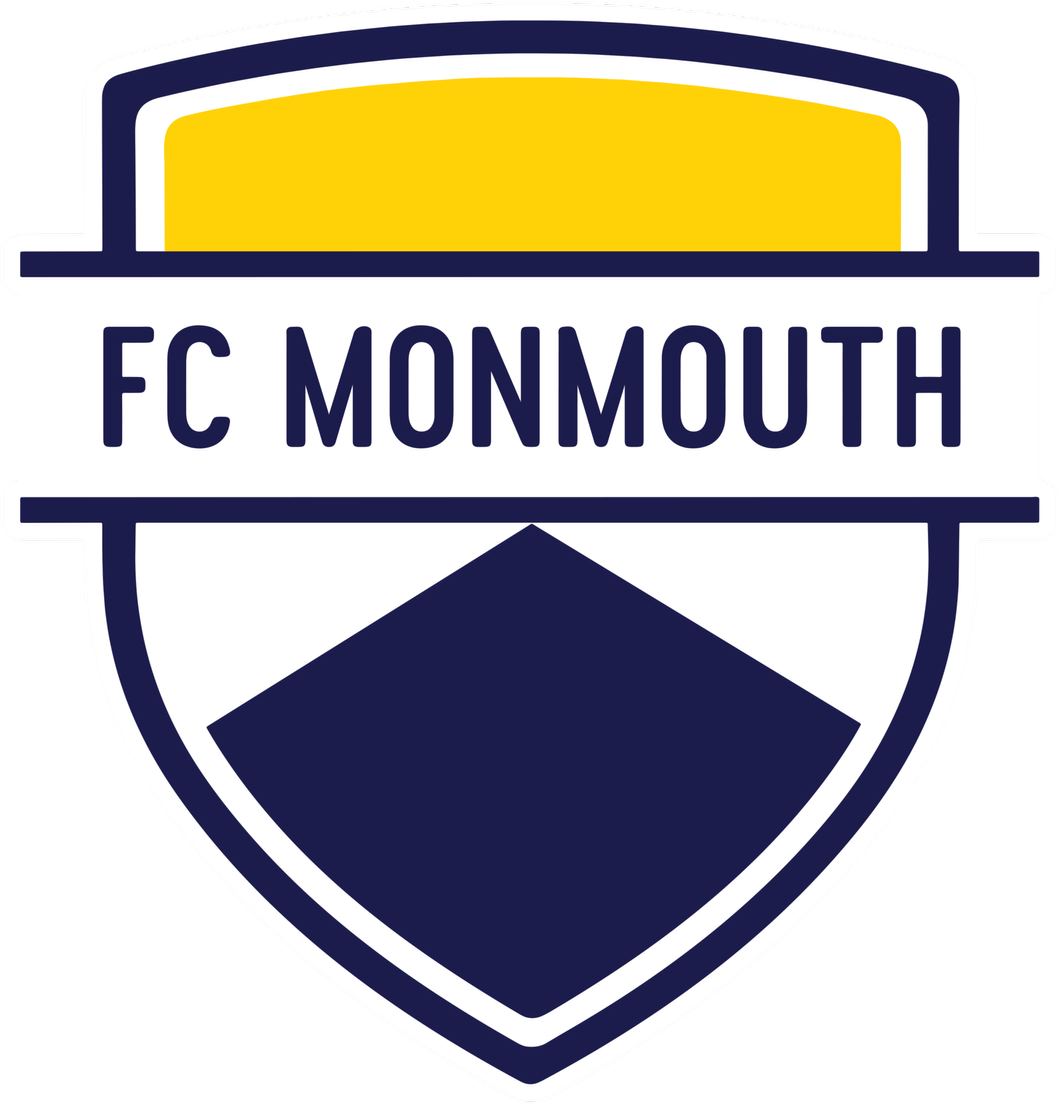
- Full name: FC Monmouth
- Founded: 2017; 9 years ago
- Stadium: Count Basie Park; Red Bank, NJ
- Owner(s): Jacco de Bruijn, Mattia Buffolino, Elliott Sheinin, Stavros Memtsoudis, Federico Girardi
- General Manager: James Davis
- Head coach: Hugh MacDonald
- League: The League for Clubs
- Website: fcmonmouth.com
Home colors	Away colors

FC Monmouth are a soccer club based in Monmouth County, New Jersey. They play in the Eastern Division of The League For Clubs, the fourth division of the American soccer pyramid. The team previously competed in the National Premier Soccer League. The team plays its home games at Count Basie Park in Red Bank.

== History ==
FC Monmouth was founded in 2017 by Jacco de Bruijn, Simon Nynens, Mattia Buffolino, John Kiely, Corbett Donato, Stavros Memtsoudis (all Monmouth County locals), and Federico Girardi. FC Monmouth was an expansion side in the National Premier Soccer League, the fourth tier of the American Soccer Pyramid, roughly equal to the USL Premier Development League, starting in 2018. On February 7, 2018, it was announced that Brian Woods, the head coach for William Paterson University's men's soccer team, would be the head coach for FC Monmouth's inaugural season. FC Monmouth concluded their first season unbeaten at their home stadium, Count Basie Stadium in Red Bank, New Jersey. They advanced into the playoffs of the Keystone Conference, only to lose against eventual National Cup finalists FC Motown. The inaugural season was widely viewed as a success, as it brought communities in Monmouth County together around the sport of soccer. An official supporters club, "The 732 SC" was founded with its base in Rumson, New Jersey.

FC Monmouth returned to play for the 2021 National Premier Soccer League season after the 2020 season was cancelled due to COVID-19. After completing the regular season with a 4th-place finish in the Keystone Conference, FC Monmouth advanced to their first ever Keystone Conference final, eventually losing to FC Motown.

In 2025, FC Monmouth announced it would enter The League for Clubs, a new national amateur in the United States. The club also announced Monmouth University Associated Head Coach, Hugh MacDonald, as their third head coach in club history. FC Monmouth then introduced its official women's side who will compete in the Women's Premier Soccer League. Players Development Academy (PDA) Director of Coaching (Shore), Lou Santa Cruz, will serve as their first-ever head coach. The team is composed of collegiate players from around the county.

=== Men's team ===
Year	Division	League	Regular season	Playoffs	U.S. Open Cup	Avg. attendance
2018	4	NPSL	4th, Keystone Conference	Conference Semifinals	did not enter	420
2019	4	NPSL	5th, Keystone Conference	did not qualify	did not qualify	—
2020	4	NPSL	Cancelled	Cancelled	Cancelled	—
2021	4	NPSL	4th, Keystone Conference	Conference Finals	Cancelled	—
2022	4	NPSL	8th, Keystone Conference	did not qualify	did not qualify	—
2023	4	NPSL	4th, Keystone East Conference	TBA	did not qualify	—
2024	4	NPSL	4th, Keystone East Conference	TBA	did not qualify	—
2025	4	TLC	1st, Northeast Conference – North Division	Region Semifinals	2nd qualifying round	—
2026	4		3rd, Northeast Conference - South Division	did not qualify	2nd Qualifying Round	—
2027	4				3rd Qualifying Round	—

=== Women's team ===
Year	Division	League	Regular season	Playoffs
2025	4	WPSL	2nd, Colonial Division	did not qualify
2026	4	WPSL	5th, Colonial Division	did not qualify
