= Dietz Stadium =

Stadium in Kingston, New York

Robert Dietz Memorial Stadium
- Interactive map of Robert Dietz Memorial Stadium
- Location: Kingston, New York
- Coordinates: 41°56′4.56″N 74°1′39.31″W
- Owner: City of Kingston (50%); Kingston City School District (50%)
- Operator: City of Kingston
- Capacity: 1,500
- Surface: Grass (1949–1989); AstroTurf (1989–2009); FieldTurf (2009–present)

Construction
- Opened: 1949

Tenants
- Kingston Colonials (Colonial/Can-Am) (1949–1951); Kingston High School Tigers (NYSPHSAA) (1952–present); Hudson Valley Highlanders (NAFL) (2008); Kingston Stockade FC (NPSL) (2016–present)

Robert Dietz Memorial Stadium is a football stadium in Kingston, New York. Dietz Stadium is the home field of the Kingston High School Tigers football team. Originally the Kingston Municipal Stadium, in 1954 it was dedicated to Robert H. Dietz, a Medal of Honor recipient killed in World War II. Dietz was a Kingston native.

== Track length ==
One lap on the track is 400 meters.

== Kingston Colonials ==
Dietz Stadium was originally built as a football stadium over the old Kingston Fairgrounds for the local high school, but was repurposed to serve as the home of the revived Kingston Colonials, a Class B baseball team.

== High school football ==
After the team folded in 1951, the stadium was purchased by the City of Kingston for the Kingston City School District, and has served as a high school football stadium ever since. In a 2019 agreement with the city the school district handed over operational and capital control of the stadium to the city while retaining their ownership stake and use of the stadium.

== Soccer ==
Dietz Stadium has been the home of Kingston Stockade FC since 2016. Stockade FC plays in the National Premier Soccer League (NPSL) and won the North Atlantic White Conference Championship in 2017.

== Professional football ==
The team served as the home stadium for the short-lived Hudson Valley Highlanders of the North American Football League; the team played only one season in 2008.
