= FC Davis =

- Full name: Football Club Davis
- Nickname: The Golden Lions
- Founded: 2017
- Stadium: Playfields Sports Park; Davis, California
- Owner: Adam Lewin
- League: The League for Clubs
- 2025: 1st of NorCal Conference; Playoffs: lost of semifinals
- Website: footballclubdavis.com
Home colours	Away colours

FC Davis is a semi-pro association football club based in Davis, California that play in The League for Clubs West Region, NorCal Conference.

== History ==
FC Davis was founded in 2017 by Adam Lewin. The team began play at Aggie Stadium in Davis, California. The team had one of the strongest attendances in the league as they regularly pulled in 4 digit figures to their ground. The team finished sixth in the Golden Gate Conference on 14 points.

In 2019 FC Davis moved its home matches from the University of California, Davis to Playfields Sports Park. The team won the Golden Gate Conference title that season. In 2025, FC Davis joined The League for Clubs.

== Club culture ==
The club's supporter club, "The Lions Den" was founded in 2019.

== Year-by-year ==
As of July 27, 2025

Year	League	Reg. season	Playoffs	USOC
2018	NSPL	6th, Golden Gate	DNQ	DNE
2019	NPSL	1st, Golden Gate	Regional Quarterfinals	DNE
2020	COVID-19			
2021	COVID-19			
2022	NPSL	6th, Golden Gate	Regional Quarterfinals	Second qualifying round
2023	NPSL	7th, Golden Gate	Regional Semifinals	DNE
2023	NPSL	7th, Golden Gate	Regional Semifinals	DNE
2024	UPSL	6th, NorCal North	DNQ	DNE
2025	TLC	1st, NorCal	Region Semifinals	DNE

== Women's team ==
FC Davis fields a semi-professional women's squad which competes in the Women's Premier Soccer League, winning the league title in 2021.

=== Seasons ===
As of July 26, 2025

Year	League	Reg. season	Playoffs
2021	WPSL	5th, Group F	DNQ
2022	WPSL	5th, Group F	DNQ
2023	WPSL	5th, Pac North	DNQ
2024	WPSL	2nd, Pac North	DNQ
2025	WPSL	3rd, NorCal Conference	DNQ
2026	WPSL	4th, Sacramento Valley Division	DNQ
