= River Valley High School (California) =

Location
- 801 El Margarita Road; Yuba City, California, Sutter County, California 95993; United States; 39.138649°N 121.659486°W

Information
- School type: Public High School
- Established: 2005
- School district: Yuba City Unified School District
- Principal: Lee McPeak
- Teaching staff: 87.52 (FTE)
- Grades: 9-12
- Enrollment: 1,676 (2023-2024)
- Average class size: 30 Students
- Student to teacher ratio: 19.15
- Campus type: Closed
- Colors: Green, Silver
- Slogan: Fear The Talon
- Athletics: CIF Division IV
- Athletics conference: Tri-County Conference
- Mascot: Falcon
- Website: rvhs.ycusd.k12.ca.us

River Valley High School (Also known as RVHS) is a public high school located in Yuba City, Sutter County, California, United States. It was founded in 2005, and has grades 9-12.

== 2022 ‘Slave Auction’ video ==
River Valley High School Football Team

On October 3, 2022, a video was created inside of the football locker room of the school’s football players to auction off their black teammates. Because of this shocking and disturbing event, these players were suspended and the varsity season was cancelled.

== History ==
The school, the second high school in the city after Yuba City High School, was built due to Measure SS, a $30.6 million bond measure which was approved by local voters in 1999.
