= Abessinio Stadium =

Athletic and cultural venue in Delaware

Coordinates: 39.761061°N 75.552867°W

- Interactive map of Abessinio Stadium
- Former names: Baynard Stadium, Baynard Field
- Address: 1 St. Rocco Way, Wilmington, DE 19802
- Owner: City of Wilmington
- Operator: Abessinio Stadium LLC
- Capacity: 5,000
- Type: Athletic and Cultural Venue
- Acreage: 16

Construction
- Opened: June 10, 1922
- Renovated: 1956, 1972, 2020
- Expanded: 2020
- Architect: ABHA Architects
- Structural engineers: CDA Engineering, Inc.
- General contractor: The Whiting-Turner Contracting Company

Tenants
- Wilmington Renegades (ACFL) (1966-67); Salesianum School (DIAA) (1922–present)

Abessinio Stadium (formerly Baynard Stadium and Baynard Field) is a state-of-the-art 5,000 seat athletic and cultural venue located off W. 18th Street along the westerly boundary of Brandywine Park in Wilmington, Delaware.

Originally a gift from Samuel H. Baynard, then president of the Board of Park Commissioners, “Baynard Field” first opened on June 10, 1922, and contained two baseball fields and a running track in its original configuration.

The stadium, while owned by the City of Wilmington, had been managed and maintained by the State of Delaware through the Department of Natural Resources and Environmental Control since 1998, at an approximate loss of $100,000.00 per year.

The regular use of the stadium in the over forty years since its last significant renovation in 1972, began to take its toll on the historic and treasured community asset. Between May and July 2016, the bleachers on the south side of the stadium were condemned following a structural engineering assessment and then demolished.

In October 2018, after an extensive public process, the Wilmington City Council approved a public/private partnership between the City of Wilmington and Salesianum School, whereby the City agreed to long-term lease with Salesianum School and Salesianum agreed to restore and renovate the stadium into a state-of-the-art athletic and cultural venue, including, among other things, an artificial turf field, a state-of-the-art 8-lane track, team locker rooms, a VIP Suite, a press/coaches box, a video scoreboard, concessions, lights, new bleachers, numerous restroom facilities, an on-site physical therapy suite open to the public, classrooms, state park offices, improved landscaping, and parking.

In December 2018, Salesianum announced that Rocco and Mary Frances Abessinio had made a historic $16 million gift to Salesianum School to facilitate the renovations to Abessinio Stadium.

The newly renovated Abessinio Stadium officially re-opened on November 13, 2020.
