= Gene Cox Stadium =

American football venue in Tallahassee, Florida

Coordinates: 30.40366°N 84.27294°W

Hurley W. Rudd Field at Gene Cox Stadium
- "Gene Cox" or "Hurley Rudd"
- Interactive map of Hurley W. Rudd Field at Gene Cox Stadium
- Full name: Hurley W. Rudd Field at Gene Cox Stadium
- Former names: Capital Stadium (1969-1998)
- Location: 601 Paul Russell Road, Tallahassee, FL
- Owner: Leon County Schools
- Capacity: 5,500 (seating) 6,500 (max)
- Surface: turf Grass

Construction
- Built: 1961-62 School year as Capital Field

Tenants
- Leon County Public Schools (1969-present); Tallahassee SC (2021-present); TLH Reckoning (2024-present)

Hurley W. Rudd Field at Gene Cox Stadium is a municipal American football venue for local teams in Tallahassee, FL. It seats approximately 5,500 fans, but can accommodate up to 1,000 additional people. It currently serves as a neutral site for all nine public middle schools and five public high schools in Leon County. It is adjacent to the North Florida Fairgrounds.

== History ==
The stadium was built in 1969, when the addition of a third high school called for the construction of a shared central sports facility. A location bordering the North Florida Fairgrounds, on the south side of town, was selected.

Originally called Capital Stadium, its name was changed in 1998 to honor local high school coaching legend Gene Cox shortly after his retirement. The natural grass field was named in honor of four-term Florida state legislator and former Tallahassee, FL mayor Hurley W. Rudd Sr.. The field was renovated in 2018, with a new turf surface being installed.

== Football Use ==
The stadium and field is officially a neutral site for all Tallahassee, FL public high schools, with the designated home and away teams in intercity games rotating on a year by year basis. However, the field has been occasionally painted by the county during the postseason to support specific area teams in the playoffs.

== Other Use ==
In addition to serving Leon County public school football, Hurley W. Rudd Field at Gene Cox Stadium also hosts several other annual events, such as the regional high school marching band Marching Performance Assessment and the spring football combine. In 2006, it was the fall training site for the Tallahassee Titans, an American Indoor Football Association franchise, during the team's only season.
