= Justin-Siena High School =

Location
- 4026 Maher Street; Napa, California 94558; United States; 38°19′51″N 122°19′17″W

Information
- Type: Private, Coeducational
- Motto: Sempre Avanti (Always Forward)
- Religious affiliation: Roman Catholic
- Established: 1966
- Founder: Joseph Alemany
- Status: In operation
- Local authority: California Department of Education - Private School Division
- Authority: CA Education Code Section 33190
- CEEB code: 052082
- President: Matthew Powell
- Faculty: 80
- Teaching staff: 40
- Grades: 9-12
- Average class size: 20
- Student to teacher ratio: 12:1
- Campus size: 40 acres
- Campus type: High School
- Colors: Navy and Red
- Athletics conference: Vine Valley Athletic League
- Team name: Braves
- Accreditation: Western Association of Schools and Colleges
- Publication: 'Avanti' (Alumni Magazine)
- Yearbook: Cornerstone
- Tuition: ~$20,500 (2020-2021)
- Affiliation: Lasallian
- Website: justin-siena.org

Justin-Siena High School is a Catholic preparatory school in the Lasallian tradition, located in Napa, California, within the Diocese of Santa Rosa.

The school was created when Justin High School for males, sponsored by the Christian Brothers, merged with St. Catherine of Siena High School for females, sponsored by the Dominican Sisters of San Rafael in 1972.

The student population currently numbers approximately 600. It provides education to a diverse student population including North Bay residents from Napa, Solano, and Sonoma Counties, as well as international students. Justin-Siena has awarded more than $3.5 million in tuition assistance for the 2020-21 school year. Approximately 32.87% of students receive tuition assistance with the average grant covering 48.6% of tuition. The school is administered by a president and is staffed by religious and lay men and women.

== Growth plans ==
In 2011, the school had announced preliminary plans to lease 10 acres of its property to Lowe's. Revenue from the lease would have provided capital to finance campus improvements, including the construction of a new science and academic research center, an aquatics center, a renovated performing arts center and renovations to classrooms, the cafeteria and locker rooms. Later in the 2011, Lowes announced plans to close 20 stores and scale back future expansion plans, The company did not indicate how plans for the Justin Siena site would be affected by this announcement. In 2014, the school announced scaled back plans to remodel, expand and upgrade the facility. The school announced plans to lease 6.42 acres of school property for commercial development with the goal of funding tuition assistance. At the time of the announcement, several residents in the surrounding neighborhood expressed concerns regarding increased traffic and other environmental impacts.

== Notable alumni ==
- Josh Jackson, basketball player, attended the school but did not play for the team
- Andy Miller (golfer), Professional golfer
- Olivia O'Brien, singer and songwriter
- Brett Wallace, baseball player
