= Pensacola FC =

- Full name: Pensacola Football Club
- Founded: 2013; 13 years ago
- Ground: Ashton Brosnaham Stadium; Pensacola, Florida
- Capacity: 2,500
- Owner: Justin Witkin
- Head Coach: Dean Logan
- League: The League for Clubs
- 2026: Champions
Home colors

Pensacola FC is an American professional soccer team based in Pensacola, Florida the men's side competes in the National Premier Soccer League and the women's side competes in the Women's Premier Soccer League. It formerly played in the Gulf Coast Premier League.

== History ==
The team was founded in 2013 and competed in the National Premier Soccer League. They were part of the Gulf Coast Texans organization, which also included a team in the Women's Premier Soccer League and youth teams. In 2013, the team announced it would end its partnership with the Texans and adopt a new name, Pensacola City FC.

The team announced on May 29, 2014, they were folding and would not complete the 2014 NPSL season. In 2015 a team would compete in the Super-20 League for one season (the league was dissolved), missing the league playoffs.

The club returned for the 2017 Gulf Coast Premier League for its first summer season.

In December 2017 the team announced it was rebranding as Pensacola Football Club.

== Year-by-year ==
Year	League	W-D-L	Regular season	Playoffs	Open Cup
2013	NPSL	5-3-2	2nd, Southeast	did not qualify	did not enter
2015	Super-20		?, Southeast	did not qualify	did not enter
2017	GCPL	6-1-3	2nd (tie), East	did not qualify	did not enter
2018	GCPL	4-3-3	3rd, East	did not qualify	did not enter
2019	GCPL	2-2-6	6th, East	did not qualify	did not enter
2021	GCPL	2-7	8th, East	did not qualify	did not enter
2021	NPSL	9-2-3	2nd, Gulf Conference	Conference Semifinals	did not enter
2022	GCPL	2-2-4	5th, East	did not qualify	did not enter
2022	NPSL	6-1-5	4th, Gulf Conference	Conference Semifinals	did not enter
2023	NPSL	5-2-5	3rd, Gulf Conference	Conference Finals	did not enter
2024	NPSL	7-1-3	2nd, Gulf Conference	Conference Semifinals	did not enter
2025	TLFC	10-0-2	1st, Gulf Coast Conference	Conference Finals	did not enter

== Head coaches ==
- (Trinidad and Tobago) Dean Logan (2024) NPSL, GCL2
- (United States) Rob Simon (2024) GCPL
- (Trinidad and Tobago) Dean Logan (2023) NPSL, GCL2
- (Trinidad and Tobago) Jason Providence (2023) GCPL
- (Trinidad and Tobago) Dean Logan (2022) NPSL
- (United States) Alex Guyer (2022) GCPL
- (Trinidad and Tobago) Dean Logan (2021) NPSL
- (United States) Alex Guyer (2021) GCPL
- (Trinidad and Tobago) Dean Logan (2019)
- (Italy) Nolan Intermoia (2018)
- (United States) Nick Cardosa (2017)
- (United States) Gary Hindley (2014)
- (Brazil) Felipe Lawall (2013)

== Stadium ==
- Ashton Brosnaham Stadium; Pensacola (2013–present)
- Training facility at Legion Field (corner of "G" Street and Gregory); Pensacola, FL (2014–present)
- Shoreline Park (Gulf Breeze, FL); Pensacola, FL (2023)

== Honors ==
=== League ===
- The League for Clubs
  - Winners: 2026

== Players: NPSL 2023 ==
- Goalkeepers: Gabriel Mendoza, Oliver Townend, John Michael Guidroz, Caleb Thompson
- Defenders: Aaron Boateng, Tyrike Andrews, Iker Casanova, Carson Hickok, Nick Kinina, Bernardo Pacheco, Keegan Lynch, Chase Mills, Tobi White
- Midfielders: Michael Lightbourne (Capt.), Okan Erkocu, Kyle Hunnicut, Isaac Kamara, Max Pena, Tom Preston, Bernardo Torres Finn Werner, Campbell Young
- Attackers: Anthony Ciccarello, Kainan Dos Santos, Jabari Hylton, Kendrick Hernandez, Trey Clements

== Players: GCL2 2023 ==
- Goalkeepers: John Michael Guidroz, Caleb Thompson
- Defenders: Camden Carner, Jeremy Covington, Cameron Doyle, Chase Mills, Adrian Pearson, Jonathan Recinos, Will Waltrip, Fatobi White,
- Midfielders: Iddy, Bingi, Justin Bolden, Jackson Callaway, Ryan Chandler, Kyle Cosenza, Hayden Harville, Leo Kozlov, Brandon Reyes, Matt Ryan, Miller Thorsen, Jared Watt, Evan Wise, Griffin York
- Attackers: Gabriel Burton, Grant Wheeler

== Players: GCPL 2023 ==
- Goalkeepers: Alyssa Brubacher, Maciah Lipsey, Molly Swiger
- Defenders: Kendall Blackmon, Emily Doyle, Lena Dykes, Cora Helmig, Nagi Higashi, Renee Junna, Katie Kauth, Kaytlyn Larsen, Sydney White
- Midfielders: JoJo Bartlinski, Kiersten Edlund, Eduarda Fuculo, Averie Garrett, Lexi Griffin, Ava Kiss, Julieta Limardo, Jessica Meira, Hinano Nakagawa, Elexia Nelson, Larissa Ozorio, Rin Sato, Emma Simon, Dalani Stephens (Capt.)
- Attackers: Maddison Dulay, Tigana (Tiggi) Gent, Amelia Jacobs, Anna Beth Korhonen, Emma Korhonen, Ava Matherne, Paige Sawicki-Farias, Mya Swinton, Jillian Thompson, Hunter Wallace
