= 2021 National Premier Soccer League season =

National Premier Soccer League
- Season: 2021
- Dates: May 1 – July 17 (regular season); July 14 – August 7 (playoffs)
- Champions: Denton Diablos FC (1st Title)
- Regular season title: Minneapolis City SC (1st Title)
- 2022 Hank Steinbrecher Cup qualifier: Denton Diablos FC
- 2022 U.S. Open Cup qualifiers: Cleveland SC; Denton Diablos FC; Georgia Revolution FC; Hartford City FC; Las Vegas Legends; Miami United FC; Minneapolis City SC; FC Motown; Southern States Soccer Club; Tulsa Athletic
- Matches: 403
- Goals: 1,597 (3.96 per match)
- Best player: (United States) Sam Coad (Denton Diablos FC)
- Top goalscorer: 16 Goals (England) Sidney Warden (Duluth FC)
- Best goalkeeper: (England) Conor Cable (Cleveland SC)
- Biggest home win: G. Storm 14–0 Louisville (June 26)
- Biggest away win: Dallas City 1–9 OKC (June 12)
- Highest scoring: G. Storm 14–0 Louisville (14 goals, June 26)
- Longest winning run: 10 matches Minneapolis City SC (May 8 – June 30)
- Longest unbeaten run: 10 matches Minneapolis City SC (May 8 – June 30); Atlantic City FC (May 8 – July 7); Cleveland SC (May 16 – July 17); Demize NPSL (May 28 – July 10); Baltimore Christos (May 29 – July 10)
- Longest winless run: 12 matches La Crosse Aris FC (May 15 – July 17)
- Longest losing run: 10 matches Greater Lowell (May 8 – July 10); Storm FC (May 8 – July 3); Hershey FC (May 15 – June 30); Dallas City FC (May 23 – July 10)
- All statistics correct as of July 17, 2021.

The 2021 National Premier Soccer League season was the 19th season of the National Premier Soccer League and part of the 109th season of FIFA-sanctioned soccer in the United States. The 2020 season was cancelled after five weeks of play due to the COVID-19 pandemic. Miami FC, the defending league champions from 2019, left in the previous off-season and joined the National Independent Soccer Association and later the USL Championship.

The regular season started on May 1 and concluded on July 17. In total, 76 teams participated this season with a further 14 playing in conferences that decided not to participate in the summer season.

== Format changes ==
The 2021 season saw a number of changes with many in part due to the ongoing effects of the pandemic. Both the Northwest and Golden Gate Conference will not take part in traditional summer season. The NPSL later announced the Golden Gate teams would play a regular season schedule, but with it commencing in June and ending in August meaning none of the teams would be eligible for the postseason or U.S. Open Cup berths. Due to this, the South Region's Lone Star Conference joined the west for 2021 allowing two separate conferences to compete for the regional title.

The changes made ahead of last season, such as the renaming of the Northeast Region to the "East Region", the Southeast Conference's move to the East, and the renaming of the East Conference to the "Rust Belt Conference" all remained in effect. The Gulf Coast Conference, which was created ahead of 2020, will play its inaugural season in 2021.

== Teams ==
Note: Teams that are italicized previously played in the NPSL and are returning from hiatus.

=== Incoming teams ===
- Appalachian FC (Boone, NC)
- Arkansas Wolves FC (Little Rock, AR)
- Contra Costa FC (Concord/Walnut Creek, CA)
- Florida Roots Futbol Club (Panama City, FL)
- Georgia Storm Soccer Academy (Carrollton, GA)
- Irving FC (Irving, TX)
- Joy St. Louis Park (St. Louis Park, MN)
- Katy 1895 FC (Katy, TX)
- New York Shockers (Albany, NY)
- Oakland Stompers (Oakland, CA)
- OKC 1889 FC (Oklahoma City, OK)
- Panathinaikos Chicago (Chicago, IL)
- Reign FK (Bartlesville, OK)
- Sioux Falls Thunder FC (Sioux Falls, SD)
- Southern States SC (Hattiesburg, MS)

=== Departing teams ===
- Fort Wayne FC (Fort Wayne, IN)
  (joined USL League Two)
- Kalamazoo FC (Kalamazoo, MI)
  (joined USL League Two)
- Little Rock Rangers (Little Rock, AR)
  (joined USL League Two)
- Maryland Bobcats FC (Montgomery County, MD)
  (joined the National Independent Soccer Association)
- Project 51O (Oakland, CA)
  (joined USL League Two)
- Toledo Villa FC (Toledo, OH)
  (joined USL League Two)

=== Teams on hiatus ===
- Austin United FC (Austin, TX)
- Charlottesville Alliance FC (Charlottesville, VA)
- Inter Nashville FC (Nashville, TN)

=== Name changes ===
- Georgia Storm Soccer Academy to Georgia Storm
- East Bay FC Stompers to Oakland Stompers

=== Unknown status teams ===
- A.S. Los Angeles (Whittier, CA)
- Club Atletico Saint Louis (Saint Louis, MO)
- Club Xolos USA U-23 (Riverside, CA)
- High Desert Elite FC (Adelanto, CA)
- Muskegon Risers SC (Muskegon, MI)
- Nashville United (Nashville, TN)
- New York Athletic Club S.C. (Westchester County, NY)
- Oxnard Guerreros FC (Oxnard, CA)
- Ozark FC (Springdale, AR)
- Rhode Island Reds FC (Johnston, RI)

=== 2021 Teams ===
Note: Teams ~~lined out~~ are on hiatus due to the COVID-19 pandemic but still listed on the league website.

West Region
Division	Team
~~Golden Gate Conference~~	~~Academica SC~~
~~Golden Gate Conference~~	~~Contra Costa FC~~
~~Golden Gate Conference~~	~~El Farolito~~
~~Golden Gate Conference~~	~~FC Davis~~
~~Golden Gate Conference~~	~~Napa Valley 1839 FC~~
~~Golden Gate Conference~~	~~Oakland Stompers~~
~~Golden Gate Conference~~	~~Sacramento Gold FC~~
~~Golden Gate Conference~~	~~Sonoma County Sol~~
~~Northwest Conference~~	~~Crossfire Redmond~~
~~Northwest Conference~~	~~International Portland Select FC~~
~~Northwest Conference~~	~~OSA Seattle FC~~
~~Northwest Conference~~	~~PDX FC~~
~~Northwest Conference~~	~~Spokane Shadow SC~~
~~Northwest Conference~~	~~Tacoma Stars~~
Lone Star Conference	Coyotes FC
Lone Star Conference	Denton Diablos FC
Lone Star Conference	FC Brownsville
Lone Star Conference	Fort Worth Vaqueros FC
Lone Star Conference	Irving FC
Lone Star Conference	Katy 1895 FC
Lone Star Conference	Laredo Heat SC
Lone Star Conference	Midland-Odessa Sockers FC
Southwest Conference	ASC San Diego
Southwest Conference	FC Arizona
Southwest Conference	FC Golden State
Southwest Conference	Las Vegas Legends FC
Southwest Conference	Temecula FC

Midwest Region
Division	Team
Great Lakes Conference	Carpathia FC
Great Lakes Conference	FC Columbus
Great Lakes Conference	FC Indiana
Great Lakes Conference	Milwaukee Torrent
Great Lakes Conference	Panathinaikos Chicago
North Conference	Dakota Fusion FC
North Conference	Duluth FC
North Conference	Joy St. Louis Park
North Conference	LaCrosse Aris FC
North Conference	Med City FC
North Conference	Minneapolis City SC
North Conference	Sioux Falls Thunder FC
Rust Belt Conference	Cleveland SC
Rust Belt Conference	Erie Commodores FC
Rust Belt Conference	FC Buffalo
Rust Belt Conference	Pittsburgh Hotspurs
Rust Belt Conference	Rochester Lancers
Rust Belt Conference	Syracuse FC

South Region
Division	Team
Gulf Coast Conference	AFC Mobile
Gulf Coast Conference	Florida Roots Futbol Club
Gulf Coast Conference	Jacksonville Armada U-23
Gulf Coast Conference	New Orleans Jesters
Gulf Coast Conference	Pensacola FC
Gulf Coast Conference	Port City FC
Gulf Coast Conference	Southern States SC
Gulf Coast Conference	Tallahassee SC
Heartland Conference	Arkansas Wolves FC
Heartland Conference	Dallas City FC
Heartland Conference	Demize NPSL
Heartland Conference	OKC 1889 FC
Heartland Conference	Reign FK
Heartland Conference	Tulsa Athletic
Sunshine Conference	Boca Raton FC
Sunshine Conference	Central Florida Panthers SC
Sunshine Conference	Miami Dutch Lions FC
Sunshine Conference	Miami United FC
Sunshine Conference	Naples United FC
Sunshine Conference	Storm FC

East Region
Division	Team
Keystone Conference	Atlantic City FC
Keystone Conference	Electric City Shock SC
Keystone Conference	FC Monmouth
Keystone Conference	FC Motown
Keystone Conference	First State FC
Keystone Conference	Hershey FC
Keystone Conference	Torch FC
Keystone Conference	West Chester United SC
Mid-Atlantic Conference	FC Baltimore Christos
Mid-Atlantic Conference	FC Frederick
Mid-Atlantic Conference	Northern Virginia United FC
Mid-Atlantic Conference	Philadelphia Lone Star FC
Mid-Atlantic Conference	Virginia Beach City FC
North Atlantic Conference	Boston City FC
North Atlantic Conference	Greater Lowell Rough Diamonds
North Atlantic Conference	Hartford City FC
North Atlantic Conference	Kingston Stockade FC
North Atlantic Conference	New York Shockers
North Atlantic Conference	Valeo FC
Southeast Conference	Appalachian FC
Southeast Conference	Georgia Revolution FC
Southeast Conference	Georgia Storm
Southeast Conference	LSA Athletico Lanier
Southeast Conference	Metro Louisville FC
Southeast Conference	North Alabama SC

== Standings and results ==
=== West Region ===
==== Lone Star Conference ====
Pos	Team	Pld	W	L	T	GF	GA	GD	Pts	Qualification
1	Denton Diablos FC	10	8	1	1	33	17	+16	25	Lone Star Conference playoffs
2	Laredo Heat SC	10	7	1	2	27	8	+19	23	Lone Star Conference playoffs
3	Midland-Odessa Sockers FC	10	5	2	3	17	11	+6	18	Lone Star Conference playoffs
4	Katy 1895 FC	10	4	4	2	15	15	0	14	Lone Star Conference playoffs
5	Irving FC	10	4	5	1	17	16	+1	13	
6	Coyotes FC	10	4	6	0	13	23	−10	12	
7	FC Brownsville	10	2	6	2	21	30	−9	8	
8	Fort Worth Vaqueros FC	10	0	9	1	12	35	−23	1	

Source: NPSL
Rules for classification: 1) points; 2) head-to-head; 3) goal differential in head-to-head results; 4) wins; 5) total goal differential; 6) fewest losses; 7) coin toss. If three or more teams are tied on points, a mini-table involving only the tied teams is used, and teams are ranked in the mini-table on points. If two teams are tied on points in the mini-table, the two-team rules for classification apply. If three or more teams are tied on points in the mini-table, they are ranked based on 1) wins in conference competition; 2) total goal differential in conference competition; 3) fewest losses in conference competition; 4) coin toss.

==== Southwest Conference ====
Pos	Team	Pld	W	L	T	GF	GA	GD	Pts	Qualification
1	Las Vegas Legends FC	10	6	2	2	38	28	+10	20	Southwest Conference Final
2	FC Golden State	10	5	1	4	37	13	+24	19	Southwest Conference Semifinal
3	FC Arizona	10	4	2	4	22	13	+9	16	Southwest Conference Semifinal
4	ASC San Diego	10	2	5	3	20	24	−4	9	
5	Temecula FC	10	1	8	1	8	47	−39	4	

Source: NPSL
Rules for classification: 1) points; 2) head-to-head; 3) goal differential in head-to-head results; 4) wins; 5) total goal differential; 6) fewest losses; 7) coin toss. If three or more teams are tied on points, a mini-table involving only the tied teams is used, and teams are ranked in the mini-table on points. If two teams are tied on points in the mini-table, the two-team rules for classification apply. If three or more teams are tied on points in the mini-table, they are ranked based on 1) wins in conference competition; 2) total goal differential in conference competition; 3) fewest losses in conference competition; 4) coin toss.
1. ^{A} The regular season final between FC Arizona and ASC San Diego on July 10 was cancelled due to inclement weather. This match was later ruled a 0-0 draw, most likely since both teams' place in the standings were secure and that team's are required to play ten games in the regular season in order to be eligible for the next year's U.S. Open Cup tournament. As such, this game is not included in the "Matches played" section in the infobox.

=== Midwest Region ===
==== Great Lakes Conference ====
Pos	Team	Pld	W	L	T	GF	GA	GD	Pts	Qualification
1	Milwaukee Torrent (C)	10	9	1	0	29	12	+17	27	Midwest Region Semifinals
2	Carpathia FC	10	6	2	2	27	13	+14	20	Midwest Region Quarterfinals
3	FC Columbus	10	4	4	2	20	16	+4	14	
4	Panathinaikos Chicago	10	3	7	0	12	26	−14	9	
5	FC Indiana	10	0	8	2	13	34	−21	2	

Source: NPSL
Rules for classification: 1) points; 2) head-to-head; 3) goal differential in head-to-head results; 4) wins; 5) total goal differential; 6) fewest losses; 7) coin toss. If three or more teams are tied on points, a mini-table involving only the tied teams is used, and teams are ranked in the mini-table on points. If two teams are tied on points in the mini-table, the two-team rules for classification apply. If three or more teams are tied on points in the mini-table, they are ranked based on 1) wins in conference competition; 2) total goal differential in conference competition; 3) fewest losses in conference competition; 4) coin toss.
(C) Champions

==== North Conference ====
Pos	Team	Pld	W	L	T	GF	GA	GD	Pts	Qualification
1	Minneapolis City SC (C)	12	11	1	0	44	11	+33	33	Midwest Region Semifinals
2	Duluth FC	12	9	3	0	39	20	+19	27	Midwest Region Quarterfinals
3	Med City FC	12	8	4	0	33	16	+17	24	
4	Joy St. Louis Park	12	4	6	2	28	26	+2	14	
5	Dakota Fusion FC	12	4	8	0	17	34	−17	12	
6	Sioux Falls Thunder FC	12	2	7	3	18	35	−17	9	
7	La Crosse Aris FC	12	0	9	3	7	44	−37	3	

Source: NPSL
Rules for classification: 1) points; 2) head-to-head; 3) goal differential in head-to-head results; 4) wins; 5) total goal differential; 6) fewest losses; 7) coin toss. If three or more teams are tied on points, a mini-table involving only the tied teams is used, and teams are ranked in the mini-table on points. If two teams are tied on points in the mini-table, the two-team rules for classification apply. If three or more teams are tied on points in the mini-table, they are ranked based on 1) wins in conference competition; 2) total goal differential in conference competition; 3) fewest losses in conference competition; 4) coin toss.
(C) Champions

==== Rust Belt Conference ====
Pos	Team	Pld	W	L	T	GF	GA	GD	Pts	Qualification
1	Cleveland SC (C)	10	8	0	2	25	9	+16	26	Midwest Region Quarterfinals
2	Pittsburgh Hotspurs	10	8	2	0	19	14	+5	24	Midwest Region Quarterfinals
3	FC Buffalo	10	4	4	2	19	14	+5	14	
4	Erie Commodores	10	1	5	4	11	16	−5	7	
5	Rochester Lancers	10	2	7	1	12	24	−12	7	
6	Syracuse FC	10	1	6	3	9	18	−9	6	

Source: NPSL
Rules for classification: 1) points; 2) head-to-head; 3) goal differential in head-to-head results; 4) wins; 5) total goal differential; 6) fewest losses; 7) coin toss. If three or more teams are tied on points, a mini-table involving only the tied teams is used, and teams are ranked in the mini-table on points. If two teams are tied on points in the mini-table, the two-team rules for classification apply. If three or more teams are tied on points in the mini-table, they are ranked based on 1) wins in conference competition; 2) total goal differential in conference competition; 3) fewest losses in conference competition; 4) coin toss.
(C) Champions

=== South Region ===
==== Gulf Coast Conference ====
Pos	Team	Pld	W	L	T	GF	GA	GD	Pts	Qualification
1	Jacksonville Armada FC U-23	14	12	2	0	37	12	+25	36	Gulf Coast Conference playoffs
2	Pensacola FC	14	9	3	2	35	25	+10	29	Gulf Coast Conference playoffs
3	Southern States SC	14	9	4	1	22	10	+12	28	Gulf Coast Conference playoffs
4	New Orleans Jesters	14	5	4	5	26	20	+6	20	Gulf Coast Conference playoffs
5	AFC Mobile	14	4	7	3	12	21	−9	15	
6	Port City FC	14	4	9	1	20	26	−6	13	
7	Tallahassee SC	14	3	7	4	17	29	−12	13	
8	Florida Roots FC	14	1	11	2	13	39	−26	5	

Source: NPSL
Rules for classification: 1) points; 2) head-to-head; 3) goal differential in head-to-head results; 4) wins; 5) total goal differential; 6) fewest losses; 7) coin toss. If three or more teams are tied on points, a mini-table involving only the tied teams is used, and teams are ranked in the mini-table on points. If two teams are tied on points in the mini-table, the two-team rules for classification apply. If three or more teams are tied on points in the mini-table, they are ranked based on 1) wins in conference competition; 2) total goal differential in conference competition; 3) fewest losses in conference competition; 4) coin toss.

==== Heartland Conference ====
Pos	Team	Pld	W	L	T	GF	GA	GD	Pts	Qualification
1	Demize NPSL	10	7	0	3	32	9	+23	24	Heartland Conference playoffs
2	Tulsa Athletic	10	6	1	3	32	9	+23	21	Heartland Conference playoffs
3	OKC 1889 FC	10	5	3	2	33	10	+23	17	Heartland Conference playoffs
4	Arkansas Wolves FC	10	3	4	3	20	27	−7	12	Heartland Conference playoffs
5	Reign FK	10	2	5	3	18	24	−6	9	
6	Dallas City FC	10	0	10	0	9	65	−56	0	

Source: NPSL
Rules for classification: 1) points; 2) head-to-head; 3) goal differential in head-to-head results; 4) wins; 5) total goal differential; 6) fewest losses; 7) coin toss. If three or more teams are tied on points, a mini-table involving only the tied teams is used, and teams are ranked in the mini-table on points. If two teams are tied on points in the mini-table, the two-team rules for classification apply. If three or more teams are tied on points in the mini-table, they are ranked based on 1) wins in conference competition; 2) total goal differential in conference competition; 3) fewest losses in conference competition; 4) coin toss.

==== Sunshine Conference ====
Pos	Team	Pld	W	L	T	GF	GA	GD	Pts	Qualification
1	Miami United FC	10	7	2	1	23	15	+8	22	Sunshine Conference playoffs
2	Miami Dutch Lions FC	10	6	3	1	31	15	+16	19	Sunshine Conference playoffs
3	Naples United FC	10	5	2	3	24	17	+7	18	Sunshine Conference playoffs
4	Boca Raton FC	10	4	4	2	24	24	0	14	Sunshine Conference playoffs
5	Central Florida Panthers SC	10	3	4	3	22	19	+3	12	
6	Storm FC	10	0	10	0	10	44	−34	0	

Source: NPSL
Rules for classification: 1) points; 2) head-to-head; 3) goal differential in head-to-head results; 4) wins; 5) total goal differential; 6) fewest losses; 7) coin toss. If three or more teams are tied on points, a mini-table involving only the tied teams is used, and teams are ranked in the mini-table on points. If two teams are tied on points in the mini-table, the two-team rules for classification apply. If three or more teams are tied on points in the mini-table, they are ranked based on 1) wins in conference competition; 2) total goal differential in conference competition; 3) fewest losses in conference competition; 4) coin toss.

=== East Region ===
==== Keystone Conference ====
Pos	Team	Pld	W	L	T	GF	GA	GD	Pts	Qualification
1	West Chester United SC	10	9	1	0	30	11	+19	27	Keystone Conference playoffs
2	Atlantic City FC	10	8	0	2	31	8	+23	26	Keystone Conference playoffs
3	FC Motown	10	7	2	1	27	12	+15	22	Keystone Conference playoffs
4	FC Monmouth	10	3	4	3	26	20	+6	12	Keystone Conference playoffs
5	First State FC	10	3	6	1	25	30	−5	10	
6	Electric City Shock SC	10	3	6	1	14	20	−6	10	
7	Torch FC	10	3	7	0	11	38	−27	9	
8	Hershey FC	10	0	10	0	7	32	−25	0	

Source: NPSL
Rules for classification: 1) points; 2) head-to-head; 3) goal differential in head-to-head results; 4) wins; 5) total goal differential; 6) fewest losses; 7) coin toss. If three or more teams are tied on points, a mini-table involving only the tied teams is used, and teams are ranked in the mini-table on points. If two teams are tied on points in the mini-table, the two-team rules for classification apply. If three or more teams are tied on points in the mini-table, they are ranked based on 1) wins in conference competition; 2) total goal differential in conference competition; 3) fewest losses in conference competition; 4) coin toss.

==== Mid-Atlantic Conference ====
Pos	Team	Pld	W	L	T	GF	GA	GD	Pts	Qualification
1	FC Baltimore Christos	10	8	0	2	31	8	+23	26	Mid-Atlantic Conference Final
2	Northern Virginia United FC	10	5	3	2	21	14	+7	17	Mid-Atlantic Conference Semifinal
3	Philadelphia Lone Star FC	10	3	4	3	14	22	−8	12	Mid-Atlantic Conference Semifinal
4	Virginia Beach City FC	10	2	6	2	10	22	−12	8	
5	FC Frederick	10	2	7	1	17	27	−10	7	

Source: NPSL
Rules for classification: 1) points; 2) head-to-head; 3) goal differential in head-to-head results; 4) wins; 5) total goal differential; 6) fewest losses; 7) coin toss. If three or more teams are tied on points, a mini-table involving only the tied teams is used, and teams are ranked in the mini-table on points. If two teams are tied on points in the mini-table, the two-team rules for classification apply. If three or more teams are tied on points in the mini-table, they are ranked based on 1) wins in conference competition; 2) total goal differential in conference competition; 3) fewest losses in conference competition; 4) coin toss.

==== North Atlantic Conference ====
Pos	Team	Pld	W	L	T	GF	GA	GD	Pts	Qualification
1	Hartford City FC	10	6	2	2	22	12	+10	20	North Atlantic Conference playoffs
2	New York Shockers	10	6	3	1	19	10	+9	19	North Atlantic Conference playoffs
3	Kingston Stockade FC	10	5	1	4	23	9	+14	19	North Atlantic Conference playoffs
4	Valeo FC	10	5	3	2	27	12	+15	17	North Atlantic Conference playoffs
5	Boston City FC	10	3	6	1	14	20	−6	10	
6	Greater Lowell Rough Diamonds	10	0	10	0	6	48	−42	0	

Source: NPSL
Rules for classification: 1) points; 2) head-to-head; 3) goal differential in head-to-head results; 4) wins; 5) total goal differential; 6) fewest losses; 7) coin toss. If three or more teams are tied on points, a mini-table involving only the tied teams is used, and teams are ranked in the mini-table on points. If two teams are tied on points in the mini-table, the two-team rules for classification apply. If three or more teams are tied on points in the mini-table, they are ranked based on 1) wins in conference competition; 2) total goal differential in conference competition; 3) fewest losses in conference competition; 4) coin toss.

==== Southeast Conference ====
Pos	Team	Pld	W	L	T	GF	GA	GD	Pts	Qualification
1	Georgia Revolution FC	10	8	1	1	25	10	+15	25	Southeast Conference playoffs
2	Georgia Storm	10	5	3	2	26	9	+17	17	Southeast Conference playoffs
3	Appalachian FC	10	4	2	4	16	12	+4	16	Southeast Conference playoffs
4	LSA Athletico Lanier	10	4	5	1	12	19	−7	13	Southeast Conference playoffs
5	Metro Louisville FC	10	2	7	1	8	30	−22	7	
6	North Alabama SC	10	2	7	1	13	20	−7	7	

Source: NPSL
Rules for classification: 1) points; 2) head-to-head; 3) goal differential in head-to-head results; 4) wins; 5) total goal differential; 6) fewest losses; 7) coin toss. If three or more teams are tied on points, a mini-table involving only the tied teams is used, and teams are ranked in the mini-table on points. If two teams are tied on points in the mini-table, the two-team rules for classification apply. If three or more teams are tied on points in the mini-table, they are ranked based on 1) wins in conference competition; 2) total goal differential in conference competition; 3) fewest losses in conference competition; 4) coin toss.

== Playoffs ==
Note: Games are hosted by the highest seed unless noted otherwise

=== West Region Conference playoffs ===
==== Lone Star Conference playoffs ====
Semifinals; July 14
**1**	**Denton Diablos FC**	**7**
4	Katy 1895 FC	0
**2**	**Laredo Heat SC**	**3**
3	Midland-Odessa Sockers	0

Final; July 17
**1**	**Denton Diablos FC**	**3**
2	Laredo Heat SC	1

Bold = winner
* = after extra time, ( ) = penalty shootout score

Lone Star Conference Playoffs
July 14, 2021
7:30 PM CDT
Semifinals

Denton Diablos FC	7–0	Katy 1895 FC
Amann 4', 20'; Coad 22', 24', 45'; Doyle 35'; Becerra 53'	Match Report	Amoako (yellow card) 31'; Palomar (yellow card) 71'; Abdi (red card) 84'

Denton High School Stadium
Denton, Texas
July 14, 2021
8:15 PM CDT
Semifinals

Laredo Heat SC	3–0	Midland-Odessa Sockers
Turcis 27', 64' (yellow card) 64'; Morrison (yellow card) 79'; Cervantes (yellow card) 85'; Perales 90'	Match Report	Conway (red card) 88'

Texas A&M International University Soccer Complex
Laredo, Texas

July 17, 2021
7:30 PM CDT
Final

Denton Diablos FC	3–1	Laredo Heat SC
Doyle 9'; Amann 45', 90'; Cerda (yellow card) 56'; Quintana (yellow card) 90'	Match Report	Wilson (yellow card) 65'; Datner 75'

Denton High School Stadium
Denton, Texas

==== Southwest Conference playoffs ====
Semifinal; July 14			Final; July 17
			1	Las Vegas Legends FC	0
**2**	**FC Golden State**	**2**	**2**	**FC Golden State**	**3**
3	FC Arizona	0

Bold = winner
* = after extra time, ( ) = penalty shootout score

Southwest Conference Playoffs
July 14, 2021
8:00 PM PDT
Semifinal

FC Golden State	2–0	FC Arizona
Anguiano 13'; Gordillo 14' (yellow card) 51'; Dollenmayer (yellow card) 72'	Match Report	Essen (red card) 80'

Orange County Great Park
Irvine, California

July 17, 2021
7:00 PM PDT
Final

Las Vegas Legends FC	0–3	FC Golden State
Guzman (yellow card) 55'; Gonzalez (yellow card) 57'; Soriano (yellow card) 57'	Match Report	Faria 7', 11'; Gordillo 37'

Kellogg Zaher Soccer Fields
Las Vegas, Nevada

=== South Region Conference playoffs ===
==== Gulf Coast Conference playoffs ====
Semifinals; July 14
1	Jacksonville Armada U23	1
**4**	**New Orleans Jesters**	**3**
2	Pensacola FC	1
**3**	**Southern States SC**	**2**

Final; N/A
4	New Orleans Jesters
**3**	**Southern States SC**	**w/o**

Bold = winner
* = after extra time, ( ) = penalty shootout score

Gulf Coast Conference Playoffs
July 14, 2021
7:00 PM EDT
Semifinals

Pensacola FC	1–2	Southern States SC
Hylton 11' (yellow card) 16'; Lightbourne (yellow card) 68'; Machado (yellow card) 75'; Hickok (yellow card) 84'	Match Report	Shepherd 1'; Hefele (yellow card) 37'; Reynolds 42' (yellow card) 82'; Diouf (yellow card) 90'; Fain (yellow card) 90'

Ashton Brosnaham Stadium
Pensacola, Florida
July 14, 2021
7:00 PM EDT
Semifinals

Jacksonville Armada U-23	1–3	New Orleans Jesters
Davis 12'	Match Report	Green 4'; Walsh 16' (yellow card) 80'; Hulme (yellow card) 35'; 76' (o.g.); Dervishaj (yellow card) 89'; Judice (yellow card) 90'

Jangro Stadium
Jacksonville, Florida

Final

Southern States SC	Walkover	New Orleans Jesters

==== Heartland Conference playoffs ====
Semifinals; July 14
**1**	**Demize NPSL**	**2**
4	Arkansas Wolves	1
**2**	**Tulsa Athletic**	**2(5)**
3	OKC 1889 FC	2(4)

Final; July 17
1	Demize NPSL	1
**2**	**Tulsa Athletic**	**2**

Bold = winner
* = after extra time, ( ) = penalty shootout score

Heartland Conference Playoffs
July 14, 2021
7:00 PM CDT
Semifinals

Tulsa Athletic	2–2 (a.e.t.)	OKC 1889 FC
Garcia 32'; Alvarez (yellow card) 90'; Gilbert 101'	Match Report	Bice 63'; Hogan 66'; Shepherd (yellow card) 75'; Forisch (yellow card) 84'; Kim (red card) 90'; Burley (yellow card) 102'
Penalties
	5–4

Titan Sports and Performance Center
Tulsa, Oklahoma
July 14, 2021
7:00 PM CDT
Semifinals

Demize NPSL	2–1	Arkansas Wolves
Hornung 6'; Maxmiano (yellow card) 38'; Marques 72'	Match Report	Mugala 9'; Zwane (yellow card) 21'; Meyer (yellow card) 23'; Makaramba (yellow card) 48'

Lake Country Soccer Cooper Stadium
Springfield, Missouri

July 17, 2021
7:00 PM CDT
Final

Demize NPSL	1–2	Tulsa Athletic
Mccormick (yellow card) 36'; Clout (yellow card) 53'; Soares (yellow card) 78'; Marques 87'	Match Report	Garcia (yellow card) 16'; Alvarez 24'; Brigida 64'; Harris (yellow card) 79'

Lake Country Soccer Cooper Stadium
Springfield, Missouri

==== Sunshine Conference playoffs ====
Semifinals; July 14
**1**	**Miami United FC**	**4**
4	Boca Raton FC	2
2	Miami Dutch Lions	1
**3**	**Naples United FC**	**4**

Final; July 17
1	Miami United FC	1
**3**	**Naples United FC**	**4**

Bold = winner
* = after extra time, ( ) = penalty shootout score

July 14, 2021
7:00 PM EDT
Semifinals

Miami United FC	4–2	Boca Raton FC
Micoli 30', 66'; Solari 34' (pen.); Alves 40' (yellow card) 72'; Fraggetti (yellow card) 84'	Match Report	Veiga 4'; Andreo (yellow card) 34'; Gonzales (yellow card) 45'; Sprecakovic 49' (pen.); Hernandez (yellow card) 68'

Monsignor Pace High School
Miami Gardens, Florida
July 14, 2021
7:00 PM EDT
Semifinals

Miami Dutch Lions	1–4	Naples United FC
Jacobs (yellow card) 2'; Spickenbaum (yellow card) 27'; Raptis (yellow card) 43'; Manthey 85'	Match Report	Gonzalez 11', 53'; Espindola 28'; Marisi (yellow card) 81' (goal) 88'; Moreno (yellow card) 90'

Paradise Coast Sports Complex
Naples, Florida

July 14, 2021
7:00 PM EDT
Final

Miami United FC	1–4	Naples United FC
Gordon 34'; Conditi (yellow card) 66'; Fraggetti (yellow card) 90'	Match Report	Resquin (yellow card) 33'; Faus (yellow card) 45'; Maldonado (yellow card) 54'; Marsico 58', 67'; Ratti (yellow card) 69'; Gonzalez (yellow card) 76' (goal) 82'; Cano 90' (yellow card) 90'

Monsignor Pace High School
Miami Gardens, Florida

=== East Region Conference playoffs ===
==== Keystone Conference playoffs ====
Semifinals; July 16
1	West Chester United	1
**4**	**FC Monmouth**	**3**
2	Atlantic City FC	2
**3**	**FC Motown**	**3**

Final; July 18
4	FC Monmouth	0
**3**	**FC Motown**	**2**

Bold = winner
* = after extra time, ( ) = penalty shootout score

Keystone Conference Playoffs
July 16, 2021
7:00 PM EDT
Semifinals

Atlantic City FC	2–3	FC Motown
Laenger 6'; Fenwick (yellow card) 43'; Campbell 90'; Saez (yellow card) 90'	Match Report	Cordeiro (yellow card) 2'; Hackett 23'; Oliveira (yellow card) 25'; Boateng 28'; Peterson 33' (yellow card) 54'; Tueno (yellow card) 62'; Enowbi (yellow card) 90'; Bednarsky (yellow card) 90'

Silver Eagle Stadium
Egg Harbor Township, New Jersey
July 16, 2021
7:30 PM EDT
Semifinals

West Chester United SC	1–3	FC Monmouth
Rosenbaum (yellow card) 65'; Tima (yellow card) 85'; Azab 90'	Match Report	Calderon 61', 67', 90' (yellow card) 81'; Pizzimenti (yellow card) 81'

Kildare's Field
West Chester, Pennsylvania

July 18, 2021
7:00 PM EDT
Final

FC Motown	2–0	FC Monmouth
Peterson 36' (yellow card) 39'; Bello 38'	Match Report	Nigro (yellow card) 61'; Pizzimenti (yellow card) 84'

MSU Soccer Park
Montclair, New Jersey

==== Mid-Atlantic Conference playoffs ====
Semifinal; July 14			Final; July 17
			**1**	**FC Baltimore Christos**	**3**
2	Northern Virginia United	2	3	Philadelphia Lone Star	0
**3**	**Philadelphia Lone Star**	**3**

Bold = winner
* = after extra time, ( ) = penalty shootout score

Mid-Atlantic Conference Playoffs
July 14, 2021
7:00 PM EDT
Semifinals

Northern Virginia United FC	2–3	Philadelphia Lone Star FC
Humm 4'; Rawlins 24'; Rodriguez (yellow card) 67'; Rochard (yellow card) 88'; Welsh (yellow card) 88'	Match Report	Allison 25', 45'; Singbah 73'

Cropp Metcalfe Park at Evergreen Sportsplex
Leesburg, Virginia

July 17, 2021
7:00 PM EDT
Final

FC Baltimore Christos	3–0	Philadelphia Lone Star FC
Travers (yellow card) 28'; Stitz 33'; O’Connor 51'; Merriam (yellow card) 72'; Lee 89'	Match Report	Halley (yellow card) 34'; Allison (yellow card) 70'; Kamara (yellow card) 81'

CCBC Essex Stadium
Essex, Maryland

==== North Atlantic Conference playoffs ====
Semifinals; July 14
**1**	**Hartford City FC**	**1**
4	Valeo FC	0
2	New York Shockers	1(2)
**3**	**Kingston Stockade FC**	**1(4)**

Final; July 17
**1**	**Hartford City FC**	**3**
3	Kingston Stockade FC	2

Bold = winner
* = after extra time, ( ) = penalty shootout score

North Atlantic Conference Playoffs
July 14, 2021
7:30 PM EDT
Semifinals

New York Shockers	1–1 (a.e.t.)	Kingston Stockade FC
Winglosky 62'; Cebollero (yellow card) 92'	Match Report	Langkafel (yellow card) 17'; Zobre 39'; Kabore (red card) 71'; Koziol (yellow card) 83'; Morris (yellow card) 90'; Davenport (yellow card) 103'
Penalties
Adefioye (penalty scored); Kim (penalty scored); Rabiu (penalty missed); Beeston (penalty missed)	2–4	Penalty scored Penalty missed

Afrim's Sports Park
Colonie, New York
July 14, 2021
7:30 PM EDT
Semifinals

Hartford City FC	1–0	Valeo FC
Silverman 26'; Hughes (yellow card) 82'	Match Report	Namusse (yellow card) 7'; Huynh (yellow card) 35'; Prata (yellow card) 80'; Mbungu (yellow card) 82'

Dillon Stadium
Hartford, Connecticut

July 17, 2021
7:30 PM EDT
Final

Hartford City FC	3–2	Kingston Stockade FC
Knecht 13', 76'; Silverman 30'; Desseno (yellow card) 50'; Wade (yellow card) 90'	Match Report	Zobre 24'; Guerra 38'; Stickley (yellow card) 48'

Dillon Stadium
Hartford, Connecticut

==== Southeast Conference playoffs ====
Semifinals; July 14
**1**	**Georgia Revolution**	**2(6)**
4	LSA Athletico Lanier	2(5)
**2**	**Georgia Storm**	**2**
3	Appalachian FC	1

Final; July 17
**1**	**Georgia Revolution**	**2**
2	Georgia Storm	1

Bold = winner
* = after extra time, ( ) = penalty shootout score

1. ^{B} The Gulf Coast Conference final was originally scheduled for July 17. The day of the match it was announced that multiple New Orleans Jesters players had tested positive for COVID-19 and the game was called off. Despite originally saying the final would be rescheduled, the NPSL announced on July 22 that Southern States SC would advance to the South Region Semifinal against Naples United FC.
Southeast Conference Playoffs
July 14, 2021
7:00 PM EDT
Semifinals

Georgia Storm	2–1	Appalachian FC
Carleton 3'; Bivens (yellow card) 45'; Jumper (yellow card) 50'; Tchoupa 68'	Match Report	Fabricio 16' (yellow card) 43'; Darden (yellow card) 76'

Grisham Stadium
Carrollton, Georgia
July 14, 2021
8:00 PM EDT
Semifinals

Georgia Revolution	2–2 (a.e.t.)	LSA Athletico Lanier
Gaither 3'; Fiore (yellow card) 22'; Hirsch (yellow card) 42'; Jabang 49'; Gimenez (yellow card) 86'; Duncan-Smith (yellow card) 104'; Carmichael (yellow card) 116'	Match Report	Bell (yellow card) 66' (goal) 89'; Velasquez (yellow card) 73'; Gonzalez (yellow card) 76'; Munoz-Monsalve 82'; Ochoa (yellow card) 115'
Penalties
Hirsch (penalty missed); Peters (penalty scored)	6–5	Penalty scored Penalty missed

Warhawk Stadium
McDonough, Georgia

July 17, 2021
8:00 PM EDT
Final

Georgia Revolution	2–1	Georgia Storm
Aramburu (yellow card) 49'; Fiore 62'; Jabang (yellow card) 77'; Carmichael 84'; Gimenez (yellow card) 87'; Duncan-Smith (yellow card) 88'	Match Report	Gomez (yellow card) 16'; Bivens 27'; Barajas (red card) 55'; Forges (yellow card) 67'

Warhawk Stadium
McDonough, Georgia

=== Regional and National playoffs ===
Regional Quarterfinals; July 20
MW5	Duluth FC	2(3)
**MW6**	**Carpathia FC**	**2(4)**
**MW3**	**Cleveland SC**	**4**
MW4	Pittsburgh Hotspurs	0

Regional semifinals July 17–23
**MW1**	**Minneapolis City SC**	**3**
MW6	Carpathia FC	0
MW2	FC Milwaukee Torrent	1
**MW3**	**Cleveland SC**	**2**
**LS1**	**Denton Diablos FC**	**3**
LS2	Laredo Heat SC	1
SW1	Las Vegas Legends FC	0
**SW2**	**FC Golden State**	**3**
**E1**	**FC Baltimore Christos**	**1**
E4	Hartford City FC	0
E2	Georgia Revolution FC	1
**E3**	**FC Motown**	**2**
HC1	Demize NPSL	1
**HC2**	**Tulsa Athletic**	**2**
**S2**	**Southern States SC**	**5**
S3	Naples United FC	1

Regional Finals; July 24–25
MW1	Minneapolis City SC	0
**MW3**	**Cleveland SC**	**2**
**W1**	**Denton Diablos FC**	**4**
W2	FC Golden State	2
**E1**	**FC Baltimore Christos**	**3(4)**
E3	FC Motown	3(3)
**S1**	**Tulsa Athletic**	**2**
S2	Southern States SC	1

National semifinals July 31
2	Cleveland SC	3
**3**	**Denton Diablos FC**	**4***
1	FC Baltimore Christos	0
**4**	**Tulsa Athletic**	**1**

National Final; August 7
**3**	**Denton Diablos FC**	**5**
4	Tulsa Athletic	2

Bold = winner
* = after extra time, ( ) = penalty shootout score

1. ^{C} The Midwest Region semifinals and final were hosted by Minneapolis City SC at Edor Nelson Field (Minneapolis, MN). The East Region semifinals and final were hosted by FC Baltimore Christos at the Community College of Baltimore County (CCBC) Essex (Baltimore, MD).
2. ^{D} The remaining four teams are reseeded for the national semifinals.

=== Regional Quarterfinals ===
Midwest Region Quarterfinals
July 20, 2021
7:00 PM EDT
Quarterfinals

Cleveland SC	4–0	Pittsburgh Hotspurs
Bell 4'; Nagucki 27'; Beck 54'; Pepper 90'; Derezic (yellow card) 90'	Match Report	Rocke (yellow card) 63'

George Finnie Stadium
Berea, Ohio
July 20, 2021
Quarterfinals

Duluth FC	2–2 (a.e.t.)	Carpathia FC
Starling 26'; Warden 38'; Sumner (yellow card) 48'; Condone (yellow card) 60'; McCarthy (yellow card) 77'	Match Report	Edwardson (yellow card) 15'; Smith 79', 82'; Schillinger (yellow card) 120'
Penalties
	3–4

Denfeld High School Stadium
Duluth, Minnesota

=== Regional Semifinals ===
July 17, 2021
7:00 PM CDT
Final

Demize NPSL	1–2	Tulsa Athletic
Mccormick (yellow card) 36'; Clout (yellow card) 53'; Soares (yellow card) 78'; Marques 87'	Match Report	Garcia (yellow card) 16'; Alvarez 24'; Brigida 64'; Harris (yellow card) 79'

Lake Country Soccer Cooper Stadium
Springfield, Missouri

West Region Semifinals
July 17, 2021
7:30 PM CDT
Semifinals

Denton Diablos FC	3–1	Laredo Heat SC
Doyle 9'; Amann 45', 90'; Cerda (yellow card) 56'; Quintana (yellow card) 90'	Match Report	Wilson (yellow card) 65'; Datner 75'

Denton High School Stadium
Denton, Texas
July 17, 2021
7:00 PM PDT
Final

Las Vegas Legends FC	0–3	FC Golden State
Guzman (yellow card) 55'; Gonzalez (yellow card) 57'; Soriano (yellow card) 57'	Match Report	Faria 7', 11'; Gordillo 37'

Kellogg Zaher Soccer Fields
Las Vegas, Nevada

Northeast Region Semifinal 1
July 23, 2021
4:00 PM EDT
Semifinals

Georgia Revolution FC	1–2	FC Motown
Kirkwood 40'	Match Report	Bello (yellow card) 32'; Bednarsky (yellow card) 44'; Neto 77'; Boateng 89'; Cordeiro (yellow card) 90'

CCBC Essex Stadium
Essex, Maryland

Midwest Region Semifinals
July 23, 2021
4:00 PM CDT
Semifinals

FC Milwaukee Torrent	1–2	Cleveland SC
Tiburzi (yellow card) 10' (yellow-red card) 86'; Cerro 21'; Novak (yellow card) 43' (yellow-red card) 57'; López (yellow card) 90'; Doellefeld (yellow card) 90'	Match Report	Schmidt (yellow card) 47'; Suljevic 54' (pen.), 87' (pen.)

Edor Nelson Field
Minneapolis, Minnesota
July 23, 2021
7:00 PM CDT
Semifinals

Minneapolis City SC	3–0	Carpathia FC
Goldman 18'; O'Driscoll 39'; Murakami (yellow card) 61'; Hutton 63'	Match Report	Hayes (yellow card) 47'; Jones (yellow card) 78'

Edor Nelson Field
Minneapolis, Minnesota
Attendance: 969

Northeast Region Semifinal 2
July 23, 2021
7:00 PM EDT
Semifinals

FC Baltimore Christos	1–0	Hartford City FC
Travers (yellow card) 45'; Baxter 49' (yellow card) 75'	Match Report	Ennin (yellow card) 90'

CCBC Essex Stadium
Essex, Maryland

South Region Semifinal 2
July 23, 2021
7:30 PM EDT
Semifinals

Southern States SC	5–1	Naples United FC
Cozine 6'; Reynolds 30' (red card) 75'; Hefele (yellow card) 37'; Avila 43'; Bennett 45'; Diouf (yellow card) 83'; Deas 84'	Match Report	Resquin (yellow card) 18' (yellow-red card) 45'; Gonzalez 36' (red card) 75'; Blanco (yellow card) 69'

The Oakes Training Center
Oak Grove, Mississippi

=== Regional Finals ===
West Region Final
July 24, 2021
7:30 PM CDT
Final

Denton Diablos FC	4–2	FC Golden State
Doyle (yellow card) 13' (goal) 49'; Amann 77'; Manriquez (yellow card) 68' (goal) 81'; Barajas 87'	Match Report	Faria 5', 44'; Bolano (yellow card) 34'; Cervantes (yellow card) 82'; Oliveira (yellow card) 84'; Salazar (yellow card) 89'

Denton High School Stadium
Denton, Texas
Attendance: 1,000

Midwest Region Final
July 24, 2021
1:30 PM CDT
Final

Minneapolis City SC	0–2	Cleveland SC
	Match Report	Suljevic 21'; Koniarczyk (yellow card) 60'; Bell (yellow card) 62'; McAvinew 69'; Cable (yellow card) 87'; Wiksell (yellow card) 90+2'

Edor Nelson Field
Minneapolis, Minnesota

South Region Final
July 24, 2021
3:00 PM CDT
Final

Tulsa Athletic	2–1 (a.e.t.)	Southern States SC
Raranje 8'; Franceschini (yellow card) 95'; Mello 120'	Match Report	Dadzie 10'; Hefele (yellow card) 48'; Flathau (yellow card) 69'; Deas (yellow card) 112'

Union High School Soccer Stadium
Tulsa, Oklahoma

Northeast Region Final
July 24, 2021
5:00 PM EDT
Final

FC Baltimore Christos	3–3 (a.e.t.)	FC Motown
Stitz 5'; Travers 67' (yellow card) 68'; Arbelaez (yellow card) 80'; Harris 90'; Baxter (yellow card) 93'; Harris (yellow card) 98'	Match Report	Cordeiro (yellow card) 42'; Peterson (yellow card) 45' (yellow-red card) 78'; Oliveira 62'; Fala (yellow card) 66'; Enowbi 86'; Neto 90+2'
Penalties
Penalty scored Penalty missed	4–3	Penalty scored Penalty missed

CCBC Essex Stadium
Essex, Maryland

=== National Semifinals ===
July 31, 2021
7:00 PM EDT
Semifinals

Cleveland SC	3–4 (a.e.t.)	Denton Diablos FC
McAvinew 31' (yellow card) 45'; Schmidt (yellow card) 47'; Suljevic 41', 120'; Beattie (yellow card) 107'	Match Report	Amann 3', 100'; Powell 9'; Flores (yellow card) 10'; Cerda 93'; Doyle (yellow card) 105'; Flores (yellow card) 120'

George Finnie Stadium
Berea, Ohio
July 31, 2021
7:00 PM EDT
Semifinals

FC Baltimore Christos	0–1	Tulsa Athletic
Travers (yellow card) 11'	Match Report	Bosqueiro 15'; Gonsalves (yellow card) 25'; Quashie (yellow card) 83'

CCBC Essex Stadium
Essex, Maryland

=== 2021 NPSL National Championship ===
August 7, 2021
7:30 PM CDT

Denton Diablos FC	5–2	Tulsa Athletic
Powell 3'; Wearen 7'; Amann 40', 82'; Doyle (yellow card) 42'; Pope (yellow card) 68'; Oliveira 77' (o.g.); Perez (yellow card) 83'	Match Report; NPSL Recap; Broadcast	Garcia 18', 25' (yellow card) 48'

Denton High School Stadium
Denton, Texas
Attendance: 2,394

Championship MVP: (United States) Trevor Amann (DEN)

== Return to Play Series ==
In early 2021, the NPSL announced the "Return to Play Series" which was originally meant to act as a series of competitive matches ahead of the 2021 summer season between league members. However, following the continued effects of the COVID-19 pandemic and the uncertain nature of west coast conferences the format was altered to act as a separate competition from the summer season. The eight members of the Golden Gate Conference were later announced as participants in the "Golden Gate Competition" with a round robin format scheduled over June and July.

=== Golden Gate Competition ===
Pos	Team	Pld	W	L	T	GF	GA	GD	Pts
1	FC Davis	7	6	1	0	24	10	+14	18
2	Academica SC	7	4	2	1	17	8	+9	13
3	Napa Valley 1839 FC	7	4	2	1	18	13	+5	13
4	El Farolito	7	4	2	1	13	10	+3	13
5	Sacramento Gold	7	3	3	1	17	18	−1	10
6	Contra Costa FC	7	3	4	0	14	12	+2	9
7	Oakland Stompers	7	1	6	0	8	31	−23	3
8	Sonoma County Sol	7	1	6	0	11	20	−9	3

Updated to match(es) played on July 25, 2021. Source: NPSL
Rules for classification: 1) points; 2) head-to-head; 3) goal differential in head-to-head results; 4) wins; 5) total goal differential; 6) fewest losses; 7) coin toss. If three or more teams are tied on points, a mini-table involving only the tied teams is used, and teams are ranked in the mini-table on points. If two teams are tied on points in the mini-table, the two-team rules for classification apply. If three or more teams are tied on points in the mini-table, they are ranked based on 1) wins in conference competition; 2) total goal differential in conference competition; 3) fewest losses in conference competition; 4) coin toss.

==== Playoffs ====
Note: Games are hosted by the highest seed unless noted otherwise

Quarterfinals; July 31–August 1
1	FC Davis	1
**8**	**Sonoma County Sol**	**3**
**4**	**El Farolito**	**7**
5	Sacramento Gold	4
**2**	**Academica SC**	**3**
7	Oakland Stompers	0
**3**	**Napa Valley 1839 FC**	**3***
6	Contra Costa FC	2

Semifinals; August 7
8	Sonoma County Sol	0
**4**	**El Farolito**	**4**
**2**	**Academica SC**	**2**
3	Napa Valley 1839 FC	0

Final; August 14
4	El Farolito	0
**2**	**Academica SC**	**2**

Bold = winner
* = after extra time, ( ) = penalty shootout score

Golden Gate Conference Playoffs
July 31, 2021
7:00 PM PDT
Quarterfinals

Napa Valley 1839 FC	3–2 (a.e.t.)	Contra Costa FC
10' (o.g.); Pavon 28'; Mendoza (yellow card) 76'; Johnson (yellow card) 105'; Ramirez 115' (yellow card) 119'	Match Report	Middlemiss 20'; Castro 59'; Wolfe (yellow card) 61'; Maldonado (yellow card) 73'

Dodd Stadium
Napa, California
July 31, 2021
7:00 PM PDT
Quarterfinals

FC Davis	1–3	Sonoma County Sol
Shikashio 29'; Moss (yellow card) 57'	Match Report	Silverbush 7' (yellow card) 81'; Owings 40'; Nunez (yellow card) 50'; Cruz (yellow card) 63'; Santos 67'

Playfields Sports Park
Davis, California
July 31, 2021
7:00 PM PDT
Quarterfinals

Academica SC	3–0	Oakland Stompers
Ceja 14', 38'; Rivera (yellow card) 61'; Golbad 76'	Match Report	Guzman (yellow card) 25'; Hakim (yellow card) 39'; Hatifie (yellow card) 41'

Academica Field
Turlock, California
August 1, 2021
12:00 PM PDT
Quarterfinals

El Farolito	7–4	Sacramento Gold
Arias 13' (yellow card) 63'; Chavarria (yellow card) 16'; Benson 23'; Arias 40'; Pavone 48'; Pertuz 74'; Movil 83', 90'	Match Report	Viera 12'; Villegas (yellow card) 26'; Cardona 29'; Mendoza 70'; Cervantes 85'

Boxer Stadium
San Francisco, California

August 7, 2021
12:00 PM PDT
Semifinals

El Farolito	4–0	Sonoma County Sol
Arias 8'; Pertuz (yellow card) 54'; Benson 67', 77'; Herrera 74'	Match Report	Cruz (yellow card) 7'; Berlint (yellow card) 45'; Silverbush (yellow card) 50'

Boxer Stadium
San Francisco, California
August 7, 2021
7:00 PM PDT
Semifinals

Academica SC	2–0	Napa Valley 1839 FC
Hernandez 17'; Manriquez (yellow card) 50'; Lopez (yellow card) 53'; Ceja (yellow card) 78'; Carmona 90'	Match Report	Mendoza (yellow card) 35'; Moreno (yellow card) 61'; Johnson (yellow card) 74'

Academica Field
Turlock, California

August 14, 2021
5:00 PM PDT
Final

Academica SC	2–0	El Farolito
Golbad 82', 87' (yellow card) 90+2'; Rodriguez (yellow card) 86'; Gray (yellow card) 90'	Match Report	Arias (yellow card) 36'; Garcia (yellow card) 40'; Movil (yellow card) 90'; Pertuz (yellow card) 88' (yellow-red card) 88'; Arias (yellow card) 90+3'

Academica Field
Turlock, California
Attendance: 600
