= 2019 NPSL season =

American soccer season

National Premier Soccer League
- Season: 2019
- Champions: Miami FC (2nd Title)
- Regular Season Champions: New York Cosmos B (2nd Title)
- 2020 Hank Steinbrecher Cup qualifier: Cleveland SC
- 2020 U.S. Open Cup qualifiers: ASC San Diego; Atlantic City FC; Cleveland SC; Crossfire Redmond; Denton Diablos; FC Arizona; FC Davis; FC Motown; Fort Worth Vaqueros; Med City FC; Minneapolis City SC; Naples United FC; Tulsa Athletic; West Chester United SC
- Matches: 540
- Goals: 1,996 (3.7 per match)
- Best player: (United States) Christian Enriquez (Albion San Diego)
- Top goalscorer: (Mexico) César Mexia (FC Arizona) (18 Goals)
- Best goalkeeper: (United States) Christian Coulson (Virginia Beach City FC)

The 2019 National Premier Soccer League season is part of the 107th season of FIFA-sanctioned soccer in the United States and the 17th season of the National Premier Soccer League (NPSL). Miami FC, formerly "Miami FC 2," are the defending champion.

== Changes from 2018 ==
Six members of the NPSL will participate in the inaugural NPSL Members Cup tournament immediately following the 2019 regular season.

== Teams ==
=== Incoming teams ===
Team	Location	Notes
A.S. Los Angeles	Los Angeles, California	Expansion
Central Florida Panthers SC	Orlando, Florida	Expansion
City of Angels FC	Los Angeles, California	Returned from one-year hiatus
Crossfire Redmond	Redmond, Washington	Expansion
Dallas City FC	Dallas, Texas	Returned from one-year hiatus
Denton Diablos FC	Denton, Texas	Expansion
High Desert Elite FC	Adelanto, California	Expansion
Michigan Stars FC	Pontiac, Michigan	Returned from one-year hiatus
Pittsburgh Hotspurs	Pittsburgh, Pennsylvania	Expansion
San Ramon FC	San Ramon, California	Joined from LIGA NorCal
Toledo Villa FC	Toledo, Ohio	Joined from United Premier Soccer League

=== Moved and/or rebranded teams ===
Team	Previous Name	Location	Previous Location	Notes
Atlanta SC	Atlanta Silverbacks FC	Atlanta, Georgia		Rebrand
Club Atletico Saint Louis	Saint Louis Club Atletico	St. Louis, Missouri		Rebrand
Jacksonville Armada U-23	Jacksonville Armada FC	Jacksonville, Florida		Reserve side replaced first team in league
Miami FC	Miami FC 2	Miami, Florida		Rebrand
Philadelphia Lone Star FC	Junior Lone Star FC	Philadelphia, Pennsylvania		Rebrand

=== Outgoing teams ===
Team	Location	Notes
Boca Raton FC	Delray Beach, Florida	Joined United Premier Soccer League
CD Aguiluchos USA	Oakland, California	Not listed on NPSL website
Elm City Express	New Haven, Connecticut	Hiatus
Emerald Force SC	Knoxville, Tennessee	Folded
FC Brownsville	Brownsville, Texas	Not listed on NPSL website
Fort Pitt Regiment	Pittsburgh, Pennsylvania	Not listed on NPSL website
GBFC Thunder	Union, New York	Not listed on NPSL website
Houston Dutch Lions FC	Conroe, Texas	Not listed on NPSL website
Legacy 76	James City County, Virginia	Not listed on NPSL website
Kitsap Pumas	Kitsap County, Washington	Folded
FC Milwaukee Torrent	Wauwatosa, Wisconsin	On hiatus before NPSL Members Cup
New Orleans Jesters	New Orleans, Louisiana	Inactive
Palm Beach United	Palm Beach Gardens, Florida	Rebrand, Joined USL League Two as Treasure Coast Tritons
Regals SCA	Airline, Texas	Hiatus
Seacoast United Mariners	Portland, Maine	Not listed on NPSL website
Shreveport Rafters FC	Shreveport, Louisiana	Not listed on NPSL website
Stockton FC	Stockton, California	Dropped out of the 2019 season
TSF FC	Wayne, New Jersey	Not listed on NPSL website
Viejos Son Los Trapos FC	Saint Paul, Minnesota	Hiatus

== Standings and results ==
=== Midwest Region ===
==== North Conference ====
Pos	Team	Pld	W	L	T	GF	GA	GD	Pts	Qualification
1	Minneapolis City SC (C)	12	9	2	1	30	11	+19	28	Midwest Region Quarterfinals
2	Med City FC	12	8	1	3	28	11	+17	27	Midwest Region Quarterfinals
3	Duluth FC	12	8	2	2	38	11	+27	26	
4	Minnesota TwinStars FC	12	6	5	1	27	20	+7	19	
5	Sioux Falls Thunder FC	12	2	8	2	15	25	−10	8	
6	Dakota Fusion FC	12	2	9	1	15	39	−24	7	
7	La Crosse Aris FC	12	2	10	0	10	46	−36	6	

Updated to match(es) played on July 9, 2019. Source: NPSL standings
Rules for classification: 1) points; 2) head-to-head; 3) goal differential in head-to-head results; 4) wins; 5) total goal differential; 6) fewest losses; 7) coin toss. If three or more teams are tied on points, a mini-table involving only the tied teams is used, and teams are ranked in the mini-table on points. If two teams are tied on points in the mini-table, the two-team rules for classification apply. If three or more teams are tied on points in the mini-table, they are ranked based on 1) wins in conference competition; 2) total goal differential in conference competition; 3) fewest losses in conference competition; 4) coin toss.
(C) Champions

==== Great Lakes Conference ====
Pos	Team	Pld	W	L	T	GF	GA	GD	Pts	Qualification
1	Detroit City FC (C)	14	10	1	3	39	6	+33	33	Midwest Region Semifinals
2	AFC Ann Arbor	14	9	2	3	25	10	+15	30	Midwest Region Quarterfinals
3	Grand Rapids FC	14	9	3	2	24	12	+12	29	
4	Kalamazoo FC	14	6	3	5	18	13	+5	23	
5	FC Columbus	14	4	8	2	18	23	−5	14 (Note: FC Columbus and Michigan Stars FC were equal on head-to-head points (2-2) and head-to-head goal difference (0-0).)	
6	Michigan Stars FC	14	3	6	5	14	17	−3	14	
7	Toledo Villa FC	14	2	11	1	11	38	−27	7	
8	FC Indiana	14	1	10	3	8	38	−30	6	

Source: NPSL standings
Rules for classification: 1) points; 2) head to head; 3) goal differential in head-to-head results; 4) wins; 5) total goal differential; 6) fewest losses; 7) coin toss. If three or more teams are tied on points, a mini-table involving only the tied teams is used, and teams are ranked in the mini-table on points. If two teams are tied on points in the mini-table, the two-team rules for classification apply. If three or more teams are tied on points in the mini-table, they are ranked based on 1) wins in conference competition; 2) total goal differential in conference competition; 3) fewest losses in conference competition; 4) coin toss.
(C) Champions

==== East Conference ====
Pos	Team	Pld	W	L	T	GF	GA	GD	Pts	Qualification
1	Cleveland SC (C)	10	8	2	0	29	9	+20	24	Midwest Region Semifinals
2	Rochester Lancers	10	6	2	2	20	15	+5	20	Midwest Region Quarterfinals
3	Erie Commodores	10	4	2	4	17	13	+4	16	
4	FC Buffalo	10	4	4	2	18	19	−1	14	
5	Syracuse FC	10	1	7	2	13	26	−13	5 (Note: Syracuse FC wins the tiebreaker on head-to-head points over Pittsburgh Hotspurs (4-1))	
6	Pittsburgh Hotspurs	10	1	7	2	10	25	−15	5	

Updated to match(es) played on July 13, 2019. Source: NPSL standings
Rules for classification: 1) points; 2) head to head; 3) goal differential in head-to-head results; 4) wins; 5) total goal differential; 6) fewest losses; 7) coin toss. If three or more teams are tied on points, a mini-table involving only the tied teams is used, and teams are ranked in the mini-table on points. If two teams are tied on points in the mini-table, the two-team rules for classification apply. If three or more teams are tied on points in the mini-table, they are ranked based on 1) wins in conference competition; 2) total goal differential in conference competition; 3) fewest losses in conference competition; 4) coin toss.
(C) Champions

=== Northeast Region ===
==== North Atlantic Conference ====
Pos	Team	Pld	W	L	T	GF	GA	GD	Pts	Qualification
1	New York Cosmos B	14	13	0	1	47	4	+43	40	North Atlantic Conference playoffs
2	Brooklyn Italians	14	10	1	3	43	15	+28	33	North Atlantic Conference playoffs
3	Kingston Stockade FC	14	7	3	4	22	18	+4	25	
4	Hartford City FC	14	5	5	4	37	25	+12	19	
5	Rhode Island Reds F.C.	14	4	9	1	21	38	−17	13	
6	Greater Lowell Rough Diamonds	14	3	9	2	16	41	−25	11	
7	Boston City FC	14	2	9	3	17	47	−30	9	
8	New York Athletic Club	14	2	10	2	15	30	−15	8	

Updated to match(es) played on July 9, 2019. Source: NPSL standings
Rules for classification: 1) points; 2) head to head; 3) goal differential in head-to-head results; 4) wins; 5) total goal differential; 6) fewest losses; 7) coin toss. If three or more teams are tied on points, a mini-table involving only the tied teams is used, and teams are ranked in the mini-table on points. If two teams are tied on points in the mini-table, the two-team rules for classification apply. If three or more teams are tied on points in the mini-table, they are ranked based on 1) wins in conference competition; 2) total goal differential in conference competition; 3) fewest losses in conference competition; 4) coin toss.

==== Mid-Atlantic Conference ====
Pos	Team	Pld	W	L	T	GF	GA	GD	Pts	Qualification
1	FC Baltimore	8	6	1	1	19	9	+10	19 (Note: FC Baltimore wins the standings tiebreaker over Virginia Beach City FC on head-to-head points. (4-1))	Mid-Atlantic Conference playoffs
2	Virginia Beach City FC	8	6	1	1	16	5	+11	19	Mid-Atlantic Conference playoffs
3	Northern Virginia United FC	8	3	5	0	12	10	+2	9	
4	Charlottesville Alliance FC	8	1	5	2	5	13	−8	5 (Note: Charlottesville Alliance FC and FC Frederick finished equal on head-to-head points (2-2) and head-to-head goal difference (0-0).)	
5	FC Frederick	8	1	5	2	5	20	−15	5	

Updated to match(es) played on July 9, 2019. Source: NPSL standings
Rules for classification: 1) points; 2) head to head; 3) goal differential in head-to-head results; 4) wins; 5) total goal differential; 6) fewest losses; 7) coin toss. If three or more teams are tied on points, a mini-table involving only the tied teams is used, and teams are ranked in the mini-table on points. If two teams are tied on points in the mini-table, the two-team rules for classification apply. If three or more teams are tied on points in the mini-table, they are ranked based on 1) wins in conference competition; 2) total goal differential in conference competition; 3) fewest losses in conference competition; 4) coin toss.

==== Keystone Conference ====
Pos	Team	Pld	W	L	T	GF	GA	GD	Pts	Qualification
1	Atlantic City FC	10	7	2	1	33	14	+19	22 (Note: Atlantic City FC defeated West Chester United SC in their only regular season meeting to win the standings tiebreaker.)	Keystone Conference playoffs
2	West Chester United SC	10	7	2	1	36	12	+24	22	Keystone Conference playoffs
3	FC Motown	10	6	3	1	23	13	+10	19	Keystone Conference playoffs
4	Philadelphia Lone Star FC	10	5	3	2	22	19	+3	17	Keystone Conference playoffs
5	FC Monmouth	10	5	4	1	18	21	−3	16	
6	Torch FC	10	4	5	1	16	28	−12	13	
7	Electric City Shock SC	10	2	7	1	17	31	−14	7 (Note: Electric City Shock wins the standings tiebreaker over Hersey FC based on head-to-head points. (6-0))	
8	Hershey FC	10	1	5	4	10	22	−12	7	
9	New Jersey Copa FC	10	1	7	2	16	31	−15	5	

Updated to match(es) played on June 25, 2019. Source: NPSL standings
Rules for classification: 1) points; 2) head to head; 3) goal differential in head-to-head results; 4) wins; 5) total goal differential; 6) fewest losses; 7) coin toss. If three or more teams are tied on points, a mini-table involving only the tied teams is used, and teams are ranked in the mini-table on points. If two teams are tied on points in the mini-table, the two-team rules for classification apply. If three or more teams are tied on points in the mini-table, they are ranked based on 1) wins in conference competition; 2) total goal differential in conference competition; 3) fewest losses in conference competition; 4) coin toss.

=== South Region ===
==== Sunshine Conference ====
Pos	Team	Pld	W	L	T	GF	GA	GD	Pts	Qualification
1	Miami FC	10	9	1	0	48	5	+43	27	Sunshine Conference playoffs
2	Naples United FC	10	8	2	0	24	7	+17	24	Sunshine Conference playoffs
3	Miami United FC	10	7	3	0	29	7	+22	21	Sunshine Conference playoffs
4	Jacksonville Armada FC U-23	10	3	6	1	13	32	−19	10	Sunshine Conference playoffs
5	Central Florida Panthers SC	10	1	8	1	10	38	−28	4	
6	Storm FC	10	1	9	0	8	43	−35	3	

Updated to match(es) played on July 9, 2019. Source: NPSL standings
Rules for classification: 1) points; 2) head to head; 3) goal differential in head-to-head results; 4) wins; 5) total goal differential; 6) fewest losses; 7) coin toss. If three or more teams are tied on points, a mini-table involving only the tied teams is used, and teams are ranked in the mini-table on points. If two teams are tied on points in the mini-table, the two-team rules for classification apply. If three or more teams are tied on points in the mini-table, they are ranked based on 1) wins in conference competition; 2) total goal differential in conference competition; 3) fewest losses in conference competition; 4) coin toss.

==== Southeast Conference ====
Pos	Team	Pld	W	L	T	GF	GA	GD	Pts	Qualification
1	Chattanooga FC	10	7	2	1	29	11	+18	22	Southeast Conference playoffs
2	Greenville FC	10	5	1	4	20	9	+11	19	Southeast Conference playoffs
3	Asheville City SC	10	5	3	2	12	10	+2	17	Southeast Conference playoffs
4	Inter Nashville FC	10	4	5	1	14	22	−8	13	Southeast Conference playoffs
5	Georgia Revolution FC	10	3	6	1	15	21	−6	10	
6	Atlanta SC	10	1	8	1	7	24	−17	4	

Updated to match(es) played on July 9, 2019. Source: NPSL standings
Rules for classification: 1) points; 2) head to head; 3) goal differential in head-to-head results; 4) wins; 5) total goal differential; 6) fewest losses; 7) coin toss. If three or more teams are tied on points, a mini-table involving only the tied teams is used, and teams are ranked in the mini-table on points. If two teams are tied on points in the mini-table, the two-team rules for classification apply. If three or more teams are tied on points in the mini-table, they are ranked based on 1) wins in conference competition; 2) total goal differential in conference competition; 3) fewest losses in conference competition; 4) coin toss.

==== Lone Star Conference ====
Pos	Team	Pld	W	L	T	GF	GA	GD	Pts	Qualification
1	Midland-Odessa Sockers FC	12	9	1	2	27	7	+20	29	Lone Star Conference playoffs
2	Denton Diablos FC	12	9	3	0	43	15	+28	27	Lone Star Conference playoffs
3	Fort Worth Vaqueros FC	12	7	2	3	26	14	+12	24	Lone Star Conference playoffs
4	Dallas City FC	12	6	4	2	24	22	+2	20	Lone Star Conference playoffs
5	Laredo Heat	12	4	6	2	22	18	+4	14	
6	Katy 1895 FC	12	1	10	1	9	45	−36	4	
7	Tyler FC	12	1	11	0	8	38	−30	3	

Updated to match(es) played on June 25, 2019. Source: NPSL standings
Rules for classification: 1) points; 2) head to head; 3) goal differential in head-to-head results; 4) wins; 5) total goal differential; 6) fewest losses; 7) coin toss. If three or more teams are tied on points, a mini-table involving only the tied teams is used, and teams are ranked in the mini-table on points. If two teams are tied on points in the mini-table, the two-team rules for classification apply. If three or more teams are tied on points in the mini-table, they are ranked based on 1) wins in conference competition; 2) total goal differential in conference competition; 3) fewest losses in conference competition; 4) coin toss.

==== Heartland Conference ====
Pos	Team	Pld	W	L	T	GF	GA	GD	Pts	Qualification
1	Tulsa Athletic	10	7	0	3	24	8	+16	24	Heartland Conference playoffs
2	Little Rock Rangers	10	4	5	1	18	15	+3	13 (Note: Little Rock Rangers and Demize NPSL were equal on head-to-head points (3-3) and head-to-head goal difference. (0-0))	Heartland Conference playoffs
3	Demize NPSL	10	3	3	4	9	12	−3	13	Heartland Conference playoffs
4	Ozark FC	10	3	4	3	16	18	−2	12	Heartland Conference playoffs
5	FC Wichita	10	2	3	5	15	15	0	11	
6	Club Atletico Saint Louis	10	2	6	2	13	27	−14	8	

Updated to match(es) played on July 9, 2019. Source: NPSL standings
Rules for classification: 1) points; 2) head to head; 3) goal differential in head-to-head results; 4) wins; 5) total goal differential; 6) fewest losses; 7) coin toss. If three or more teams are tied on points, a mini-table involving only the tied teams is used, and teams are ranked in the mini-table on points. If two teams are tied on points in the mini-table, the two-team rules for classification apply. If three or more teams are tied on points in the mini-table, they are ranked based on 1) wins in conference competition; 2) total goal differential in conference competition; 3) fewest losses in conference competition; 4) coin toss.

=== West Region ===
==== Southwest Conference ====
Pos	Team	Pld	W	L	T	GF	GA	GD	Pts	Qualification
1	FC Golden State (C)	18	15	2	1	67	17	+50	46	West Region playoffs
2	FC Arizona	18	12	1	5	46	19	+27	41	West Region playoffs
3	ASC San Diego	18	12	5	1	36	13	+23	37	West Region playoffs
4	Orange County FC	18	11	4	3	46	23	+23	36	
5	A.S. Los Angeles	18	7	8	3	30	37	−7	24	
6	Temecula FC	18	6	8	4	29	35	−6	22	
7	Oxnard Guerreros FC	18	5	11	2	25	44	−19	17	
8	Riverside Coras USA	18	3	12	3	27	51	−24	12 (Note: Riverside Coras USA and High Desert Elite were tied on head-to-head points (3-3). Riverside Coras USA won the tiebreaker on head-to-head goal difference (+2 to -2))	
9	High Desert Elite FC	18	4	14	0	16	47	−31	12	
10	City of Angels FC	18	3	13	2	21	57	−36	11	

Updated to match(es) played on June 25, 2019. Source: NPSL standings
Rules for classification: 1) points; 2) head to head; 3) goal differential in head-to-head results; 4) wins; 5) total goal differential; 6) fewest losses; 7) coin toss. If three or more teams are tied on points, a mini-table involving only the tied teams is used, and teams are ranked in the mini-table on points. If two teams are tied on points in the mini-table, the two-team rules for classification apply. If three or more teams are tied on points in the mini-table, they are ranked based on 1) wins in conference competition; 2) total goal differential in conference competition; 3) fewest losses in conference competition; 4) coin toss.
(C) Champions

==== Northwest Conference ====
Pos	Team	Pld	W	L	T	GF	GA	GD	Pts	Qualification
1	Crossfire Redmond (C)	10	7	2	1	30	23	+7	22	West Region playoffs
2	OSA FC	10	6	4	0	23	17	+6	18	West Region playoffs
3	Spokane SC Shadow	10	4	4	2	15	14	+1	14	
4	FC Mulhouse Portland	10	4	5	1	22	20	+2	13	
5	PDX FC	10	2	8	0	13	29	−16	6	

Updated to match(es) played on July 9, 2019. Source: NPSL standings
Rules for classification: 1) points; 2) head to head; 3) goal differential in head-to-head results; 4) wins; 5) total goal differential; 6) fewest losses; 7) coin toss. If three or more teams are tied on points, a mini-table involving only the tied teams is used, and teams are ranked in the mini-table on points. If two teams are tied on points in the mini-table, the two-team rules for classification apply. If three or more teams are tied on points in the mini-table, they are ranked based on 1) wins in conference competition; 2) total goal differential in conference competition; 3) fewest losses in conference competition; 4) coin toss.
(C) Champions

==== Golden Gate Conference ====
Pos	Team	Pld	W	L	T	GF	GA	GD	Pts	Qualification
1	FC Davis (C)	11	8	1	2	34	18	+16	26	West Region playoffs
2	San Ramon FC	11	6	4	1	22	19	+3	19	West Region playoffs
3	Academica SC	11	5	4	2	27	19	+8	17 (Note: Academica SC and Sacramento Gold were equal on head-to-head points (3-3) and head-to-head goal difference (0-0).)	West Region playoffs
4	Sacramento Gold FC	11	5	4	2	25	20	+5	17	
5	El Farolito	11	4	3	4	15	10	+5	16	
6	Napa Valley 1839 FC	11	3	6	2	17	26	−9	11	
7	East Bay FC Stompers	11	2	6	3	17	29	−12	9	
8	Sonoma County Sol	11	1	6	4	17	33	−16	7	

Updated to match(es) played on July 9, 2019. Source: NPSL standings
Rules for classification: 1) points; 2) head to head; 3) goal differential in head-to-head results; 4) wins; 5) total goal differential; 6) fewest losses; 7) coin toss. If three or more teams are tied on points, a mini-table involving only the tied teams is used, and teams are ranked in the mini-table on points. If two teams are tied on points in the mini-table, the two-team rules for classification apply. If three or more teams are tied on points in the mini-table, they are ranked based on 1) wins in conference competition; 2) total goal differential in conference competition; 3) fewest losses in conference competition; 4) coin toss.
(C) Champions

== Playoffs ==
=== Northeast Region Conference playoffs ===
==== Keystone Conference playoffs ====
Semifinals; July 2
1	Atlantic City FC	1
**4**	**Philadelphia Lone Star FC**	**2**
2	West Chester United SC	2
**3**	**FC Motown**	**3**

Final; July 6
**3**	**FC Motown**	**2**
4	Philadelphia Lone Star FC	0

Bold = winner
* = after extra time, ( ) = penalty shootout score

Keystone Conference playoffs
July 2, 2019
7:30 PM EDT
Semifinals

West Chester United SC	2–3	FC Motown
McFadden (yellow card) 20'; Bollinger (yellow card) 35'; Donovan 56'; Vare 72'; Bradley (yellow card) 87'; Kohlbrenner (yellow card) 90+2'	Match Report	Elias 4'; Knapp 23'; Fala 37'; Garcia (yellow card) 39'; Voltaire (yellow card) 80'

West Chester United SC
West Chester, PA
July 2, 2019
7:45 PM EDT
Semifinals

Atlantic City FC	1–2	Philadelphia Lone Star FC
White (yellow card) 82'; Satrustegui 90'; Calderon (red card) 90+2'	Match Report	Goodluck 48'; Jarbo (red card) 80'; Allison (yellow card) 83' (goal) 90'

Egg Harbor Township High School
Egg Harbor Township, New Jersey

July 6, 2019
7:00 PM EDT
Final

FC Motown	2–0	Philadelphia Lone Star FC
Fala 20'; Cordeiro (yellow card) 65'; Katona 80'	Match Report	Koroma (yellow card) 39' (yellow-red card) 75'; Kollie (yellow card) 41'; Donzo (yellow card) 70'; Allison (yellow card) 90'

Ranger Stadium
Madison, New Jersey

==== Mid-Atlantic Conference playoffs ====
Final; July 6
**1**	**FC Baltimore**	**1***
2	Virginia Beach City FC	0

Bold = winner
* = after extra time, ( ) = penalty shootout score

Mid-Atlantic Conference playoff
July 6, 2019
7:00 PM EDT
Final

FC Baltimore	1–0 (a.e.t.)	Virginia Beach City FC
Pulliam (yellow card) 64'; Bell 91'	Match Report	Cyrus (yellow card) 90'; Idornigie (yellow card) 100'

CCBC Essex Stadium
Essex, Maryland

==== North Atlantic Conference playoffs ====
Final; July 10
**1**	**New York Cosmos B**	**1**
2	Brooklyn Italians	0

Bold = winner
* = after extra time, ( ) = penalty shootout score

North Atlantic Conference Playoff
July 10, 2019
7:30 PM EDT
Final

New York Cosmos B	1–0	Brooklyn Italians
Bocanegra (yellow card) 32'; Agolli 72'	Match Report

Mitchel Athletic Complex
Uniondale, New York

=== South Region Conference playoffs ===
==== Southeast Conference playoffs ====
Semifinals; July 12
**1**	**Chattanooga FC**	**3**
4	Inter Nashville FC	0
2	Greenville FC	0
**3**	**Asheville City SC**	**1***

Final; July 13
**1**	**Chattanooga FC**	**4**
3	Asheville City SC	1

Bold = winner
* = after extra time, ( ) = penalty shootout score

Southeast Conference Playoffs
July 12, 2019
4:30 PM EDT
Semifinals

Greenville FC	0–1 (a.e.t.)	Asheville City SC
Shiels (yellow card) 48'; Cubillian (yellow card) 87'; Spear (yellow card) 101'; Sims (yellow card) 104'	Match Report	Allan (yellow card) 15'; Adamczyk (yellow card) 89'; Smith (yellow card) 92' (goal) 106'; Watt (yellow card) 106'; Fitzpatrick (yellow card) 120'

Finley Stadium
Chattanooga, Tennessee
July 12, 2019
7:30 PM EDT
Semifinals

Chattanooga FC	3–0	Inter Nashville FC
Walsh (red card) 45'; Webb 47'; Ferraz 51'; Woodfin 81'	Match Report Report 2	Sassano (yellow card) 50'; Down (yellow card) 89'; Brookes (yellow card) 90'

Finley Stadium
Chattanooga, Tennessee
Attendance: 3,092

July 13, 2019
7:30 PM EDT
Final

Chattanooga FC	4–1	Asheville City SC
Torres 30' (yellow card) 45'; Mendizabal 35'; Costa 51'; Ferraz (yellow card) 62' (goal) 71'	Match Report	McCurley (yellow card) 19'; Allan 39'; Smith (yellow card) 82'

Finley Stadium
Chattanooga, Tennessee
Attendance: 2,882

==== Sunshine Conference playoffs ====
Semifinals; July 10
**1**	**Miami FC**	**4**
4	Jacksonville Armada U-23	0
2	Naples United FC	1
**3**	**Miami United FC**	**2**

Final; July 13
**1**	**Miami FC**	**3**
3	Miami United FC	2

Bold = winner
* = after extra time, ( ) = penalty shootout score

Sunshine Conference Playoffs
July 10, 2019
7:00 PM EDT
Semifinals

Naples United FC	1–2	Miami United FC
Adducci (red card) 32'; Suhs (yellow card) 48'; Fragola (red card) 52'; Patat (red card) 90'; Perez 90'; Vergara (yellow card) 81' (yellow-red card) 90'	Match Report	Shenfeld 14'; 21' (o.g.)

Lely High School
Lely Resort, Florida
July 10, 2019
7:00 PM EDT
Semifinals

Miami FC	4–0	Jacksonville Armada U-23
Suarez 25'; Martínez 50'; Thiaw 65', 77'	Match Report	Martin (yellow card) 40'; Wilkins (yellow card) 73'

MSOC Buccaneer Field
Miami Shores, Florida

July 13, 2019
7:00 PM EDT
Final

Miami FC	3–2	Miami United FC
Martínez 11', 57'; González 67'; Chapman-Page (yellow card) 78'; Granitto (yellow card) 90'	Match Report	Shelton 23' (yellow card) 52'; Da Silva 34' (yellow card) 68'; Sinisterra (yellow card) 90'

MSOC Buccaneer Field
Miami Shores, Florida

==== Lone Star Conference playoffs ====
Semifinals; July 11
**1**	**Midland-Odessa Sockers FC**	**9**
4	Dallas City FC	1
2	Denton Diablos FC	1(4)
**3**	**Fort Worth Vaqueros FC**	**1(5)**

Final; July 13
1	Midland-Odessa Sockers FC	1
**3**	**Fort Worth Vaqueros FC**	**2**

Bold = winner
* = after extra time, ( ) = penalty shootout score

Lone Star Conference Playoffs
July 11, 2019
7:15 PM CDT
Semifinals

Denton Diablos FC	1–1	Fort Worth Vaqueros FC
Willis 8'; Evans (yellow card) 58'	Match Report	Masue 54'; Ramirez (yellow card) 106'
Penalties
	4–5

Mean Green Soccer Stadium
Denton, Texas
July 11, 2019
7:30 PM CDT
Semifinals

Midland-Odessa Sockers FC	9–1	Dallas City FC
Bonatto 10', 46'; McLauchlan 20'; White 23'; Luna 27', 67', 76', 88'; Agboola 60'; Aranda (yellow card) 83'; Amann (yellow card) 84'	Match Report	Hernandez (yellow card) 32'; Lopez 74'; Okpala (yellow card) 77'; Adams (yellow card) 85'

Grande Communications Stadium
Midland, Texas

July 13, 2019
7:15 PM CDT
Final

Midland-Odessa Sockers FC	1–2	Fort Worth Vaqueros FC
Luna 38'; Ruiz (yellow card) 90'	Match Report	Eligwe 16', 67'; Powell (yellow card) 71'; Hernandez (yellow card) 90'

Grande Communications Stadium
Midland, Texas

==== Heartland Conference playoffs ====
Semifinal; July 10
**1**	**Tulsa Athletic**	**6**
4	Ozark FC	2
2	Little Rock Rangers	1(0)
**3**	**Demize NPSL**	**1(3)**

Final; July 13
**1**	**Tulsa Athletic**	**2**
3	Demize NPSL	0

Bold = winner
* = after extra time, ( ) = penalty shootout score

Heartland Conference Playoffs
July 10, 2019
5:30 PM CDT
Semifinals

Tulsa Athletic	6–2	Ozark FC
Garcia 15', 44'; Habib 52'; Ruiz 60'; Riveros 89', 90'	Match Report	Bejarano (yellow card) 45'; Morais (yellow card) 88'; Zamarron 80', 90' (pen.)

Veterans Park
Tulsa, Oklahoma
July 10, 2019
7:00 PM CDT
Semifinals

Little Rock Rangers	1–1	Demize NPSL
Crabtree 26'; Beltran (yellow card) 45'; Doyle (yellow card) 80'	Match Report	Marques 15'; Nunes (yellow card) 57'; Hernandez (yellow card) 63'; Soares (yellow card) 86'; Machado (yellow card) 89'; Yankowitz (yellow card) 90'; Costa (yellow card) 109'
Penalties
Guadron (penalty missed); Beltran (penalty missed); Watson (penalty missed)	0–3	Penalty scored

War Memorial Stadium
Little Rock, Arkansas
Attendance: 2,000

July 13, 2019
2:00 PM CDT
Final

Tulsa Athletic	2–0	Demize NPSL
Nzojyibwami 6'; Ndomba (yellow card) 14'; Garcia 79' (pen.)	Match Report	Costa (yellow card) 21'; Marques (yellow card) 24'; Perry (yellow card) 69'; Helin (red card) 72'

Veterans Park
Tulsa, Oklahoma

=== Regional and National playoffs ===
Regional Quarterfinals; July 6–16
**SW2**	**FC Arizona**	**4**
GG2	San Ramon FC	0
GG1	FC Davis	1
**GG3**	**Academica SC**	**3**
**NW1**	**Crossfire Redmond**	**7**
NW2	OSA FC	1
SW1	FC Golden State	2(2)
**SW3**	**ASC San Diego**	**2(4)**
MW5	AFC Ann Arbor	1(4)
**MW6**	**Rochester Lancers**	**1(5)**
**MW3**	**Minneapolis City SC**	**2**
MW4	Med City FC	1

Regional semifinals July 12–19
**NE1**	**New York Cosmos B**
Bye
**NE2**	**FC Baltimore**	**1**
NE3	FC Motown	0
**W1**	**FC Arizona**	**3***
W4	Academica SC	2
W2	Crossfire Redmond	1(1)
**W3**	**ASC San Diego**	**1(4)**
**SS**	**Miami FC**	**2**
SE	Chattanooga FC	0
**HL**	**Tulsa Athletic**	**3**
LS	Fort Worth Vaqueros	1
**MW1**	**Cleveland SC**	**6***
MW6	Rochester Lancers	4
**MW2**	**Detroit City FC**	**2**
MW3	Minneapolis City SC	0

Regional Finals; July 20–21
**NE1**	**New York Cosmos B**	**3**
NE2	FC Baltimore	1
W1	FC Arizona	1
**W3**	**ASC San Diego**	**2**
**SS**	**Miami FC**	**4**
HL	Tulsa Athletic	1
**MW1**	**Cleveland SC**	**2(3)**
MW2	Detroit City FC	2(2)

National semifinals July 27
1	**New York Cosmos B**	**2**
4	ASC San Diego	0
2	**Miami FC**	**4**
3	Cleveland SC	1

National Final; August 3
1	New York Cosmos B	1
2	**Miami FC**	**3**

Bold = winner
* = after extra time, ( ) = penalty shootout score

1. ^{A} The remaining four teams were reseeded for the national semifinals.
2. ^{B} This match started on July 16, 2019 in Ann Arbor, MI but was suspended in the 69th minute due to darkness. It was resumed and finished on July 18, 2019 in Erie, PA.

=== Regional Quarterfinals ===
West Region Quarterfinals
July 6, 2019
5:00 PM PDT
Quarterfinals

Crossfire Redmond	7–1	OSA FC
McGlynn (yellow card) 11'; Burkholder 47', 52', 90'; Townsend 54'; King 58'; Bartlow 73'; Iniguez 78'	Match Report	Thesenvitz 26'; Barbero (yellow card) 38'; Rothrock (yellow card) 83'

Redmond High School
Redmond, Washington
July 6, 2019
7:00 PM PDT
Quarterfinals

FC Davis	1–3	Academica SC
Wilson 12'; Arnstein (yellow card) 73'	Match Report	Barriga 67'; Rodriguez 81'; Contreras 90'

Playfields Sports Park
Davis, California
July 6, 2019
7:30 PM MDT
Quarterfinals

FC Arizona	4–0	San Ramon FC
Nuno 11', 31'; Mendez (yellow card) 23'; Casillas 42'; Aguilar 90'	Match Report	Mirner (yellow card) 29'

Mesa High School
Mesa, Arizona
July 7, 2019
7:00 PM PDT
Quarterfinals

FC Golden State	2–2 (a.e.t.)	ASC San Diego
Villalobos (yellow card) 54'; Del Rio 75' (yellow card) 80'; Martins (yellow card) 76'; Garcia (yellow card) 79'; Culwell (yellow card) 83'; Madrigal 111'	Match Report	Seye (yellow card) 54'; Rice 71'; Ramos (yellow card) 94'; Arreola (yellow card) 100' (yellow-red card) 112'; Cutler (yellow card) 103'; Frimpong (yellow card) 115' (goal) 120'; Waligorski (yellow card) 119'; Antoine (yellow card) 120'
Penalties
	2–4

Linda Esperanza Marquez High School
Huntington Park, California

Midwest Region Quarterfinals
July 18, 2019
8:30 PM EDT
Quarterfinals

AFC Ann Arbor	1–1	Rochester Lancers

McConnell Family Stadium
Erie, Pennsylvania
July 16, 2019
7:30 PM CDT
Quarterfinals

Minneapolis City SC	2–1	Med City FC
Goldman 70'; Hutton 72'; Elder (yellow card) 77'; Oliver (yellow card) 77'; Adams (yellow card) 90+6'	Match Report	Bloodworth (yellow card) 37'; Wismayer (yellow card) 77'; Hilton-Jones (yellow card) 77' (goal) 78'; Adebayo (yellow card) 90+1'; Milla (red card) 90+2'

Benilde-St. Margaret's
St. Louis Park, Minnesota

=== Regional Semifinals ===
West Region Semifinals
July 12, 2019
12:00 PM PDT
Semifinals

Crossfire Redmond	1–1 (a.e.t.)	ASC San Diego
Penalties
	1–4

Redmond High School
Redmond, Washington
July 13, 2019
7:30 PM MDT
Semifinals

FC Arizona	3–2 (a.e.t.)	Academica SC
Cole (yellow card) 4'; Uno (yellow card) 29' (goal) 34', 91'; Vazquez (yellow card) 53'; Gutierrez 55' (yellow card) 120'; Feeley (yellow card) 88'	Match Report	Villegas (yellow card) 4' (goal) 43'; Gutierrez (yellow card) 35'; Galvan (yellow card) 41'; Carmona 50'; Rodriguez (yellow card) 94'

Mesa High School
Mesa, Arizona

Northeast Region Semifinal
July 13, 2019
7:00 PM EDT
Semifinals

FC Baltimore	1–0	FC Motown
Weyant (yellow card) 30'; Rodriguez 80'	Match Report	Knapp (yellow card) 56'

CCBC Essex Stadium
Essex, Maryland

South Region Semifinals
July 16, 2019
5:30 PM CDT
Semifinals

Tulsa Athletic	3–1	Fort Worth Vaqueros
Garcia 40' (yellow card) 90'; Ndomba (yellow card) 53'; Ugbah 88'; Kazeem 90'	Match Report	Ramirez 14'; Powell (yellow card) 26'; Ellis (yellow card) 90+3'

Veterans Park
Tulsa, Oklahoma
July 16, 2019
7:00 PM EDT
Semifinals

Miami FC	2–0	Chattanooga FC
González (yellow card) 19'; Morales 66'; Chapman-Page (yellow card) 90'; Granitto (yellow card) 90'; Martínez 81'	Match Report	Valenciano (yellow card) 80'; Wilschrey (yellow card) 90'; Dunstan (red card) 90'

MSOC Buccaneer Field
Miami Shores, Florida

Midwest Region Semifinals
July 19, 2019
4:30 PM EDT
Semifinals

Cleveland SC	6–4 (a.e.t.)	Rochester Lancers
Manfut (yellow card) 18'; Bell 20', 94', 101', 106' (yellow card) 49'; Beck (yellow card) 31' (goal) 90'; Long (yellow card) 37'; Musa (yellow card) 40'; Derezic (yellow card) 75' (goal) 82'; Suljevic (yellow card) 99' (yellow-red card) 110'	Match Report	Cunningham 2'; Godoi 7' (yellow card) 101'; Momic 85'; Kissi (yellow card) 85' (goal) 101'; Coughlin (yellow card) 105'; Schindler (yellow card) 119'

Keyworth Stadium
Hamtramck, Michigan
July 19, 2019
7:00 PM EDT
Semifinals

Detroit City FC	2–0	Minneapolis City SC
Lawson 22'; Diop (yellow card) 51'; Todd 79' (pen.)	Match Report Report 2	Olson (yellow card) 36'; Goldman (yellow card) 53'; Hutton (yellow card) 58'; Oliver (yellow card) 90'

Keyworth Stadium
Hamtramck, Michigan
Attendance: 4,460

|note= New York Cosmos B had a bye to the Finals

=== Regional Finals ===
South Region Final
July 20, 2019
7:00 PM EDT
Final

Miami FC	4–1	Tulsa Athletic
Granitto (yellow card) 36'; González 61'; Suarez 69'; Martínez 83', 89'; Pais (yellow card) 85'	Match Report	Diallo 25'; Ruiz (yellow card) 57'; Harris (yellow card) 72'; Reed (yellow card) 83'

MSOC Buccaneer Field
Miami Shores, Florida

West Region Final
July 20, 2019
7:30 PM PDT
Final

FC Arizona	1–2	ASC San Diego
McGlothan (yellow card) 16'; Cole (yellow card) 22' (yellow-red card) 90'; Nuño 53'	Match Report	Waligorski 17'; Kafari (yellow card) 27'; 29' (o.g.); Antione (yellow card) 90'

Mesa High School
Mesa, Arizona

Midwest Region Final
July 21, 2019
1:00 PM EDT
Final

Cleveland SC	2–2 (a.e.t.)	Detroit City FC
Cvecko (yellow card) 33'; Beck 52' (red card) 75'; Manfut 60'	Match Report Report 2	Diop (yellow card) 25'; Lawson 40'; Todd 45+' (pen.); Jirira (yellow card) 51'; Perkins (red card) 75'
Penalties
Derezic (penalty scored); Musa (penalty missed); McAvinew (penalty scored); Koniarczyk (penalty missed); Bell (penalty scored)	3–2	(penalty scored) Todd; (penalty missed) Harris; (penalty scored) Gueye; (penalty missed) Carroll; (penalty missed) Lawson

Keyworth Stadium
Hamtramck, Michigan
Attendance: 4,568

Northeast Region Final
July 21, 2019
6:00 PM EDT
Final

New York Cosmos B	3–1	FC Baltimore
Acuna 4'; Galvão (yellow card) 55'; Agolli 70'; Burgos 82'; Dennis (red card) 90'	Match Report	Saunderson (yellow card) 40'; Gumbs 45'; Glos (red card) 60'; Cyrus (yellow card) 80'; Marconi (yellow card) 90'; Balogun (red card) 90'

Mitchel Athletic Complex
Uniondale, New York

=== National Semifinals ===
July 27, 2019
7:00 PM EDT
National Semifinal

New York Cosmos B	2–0	ASC San Diego
Diosa 53'; Burgos 76' (pen.)	Match Report	Arreola (yellow card) 63'

Mitchel Athletic Complex
Uniondale, New York
July 27, 2019
7:00 PM EDT
National Semifinal

Miami FC	4–1	Cleveland SC
Chapman-Page 53'; Martínez 55'; Griffiths (yellow card) 57'; González 80'; Pais (yellow card) 85'; Heath 90'	Match Report	Korb (yellow card) 62'; Long (yellow card) 79'; Derezic 84'

FIU Soccer Stadium
Miami, Florida

=== NPSL Championship Game ===
August 3, 2019
7:00 PM EDT

New York Cosmos B	1–3	Miami FC
Burgos (yellow card) 25'; Agolli 31'; Sembroni (yellow card) 90'	Match Report	Mares 18', 24'; Chin (yellow card) 90' (goal) 90+5'; Heath (yellow card) 90'

Mitchel Athletic Complex
Uniondale, New York
Attendance: 5,285

== Members Cup ==
Six teams participated in the NPSL Members Cup, formerly known as the NPSL Founders Cup, a competition that ran from August to October 2019 after the conclusion of the regular 2019 NPSL season. It was intended to lead to a new professional league beginning play in the spring of 2020.

Several other clubs were initially announced to be part of the tournament. California United Strikers FC officially announced on Twitter that it had withdrawn from both the Founders Cup and subsequent league on March 1, 2019 and were replaced by Napa Valley 1839 FC on March 7, 2019. On June 27, 2019, Oakland Roots SC announced its intent to join the upcoming National Independent Soccer Association (NISA) in fall 2019, where they joined Cal United. They would therefore be dropping out of the tournament "to focus on NISA as (their) preferred path forward."

When the competition officially re-branded on July 24, 2019, ASC San Diego, Cal FC, FC Arizona, Miami FC, and Miami United FC had been removed, Miami FC joining NISA, while the Michigan Stars FC had been added. On August 15, Chattanooga and Detroit City were both announced to be joining NISA in the spring of 2020. Michigan Stars were also confirmed to be joining NISA on September 21. And New York Cosmos ended up later joining, in 2020.

=== Teams ===
Team	City	Stadium	Founded	Head coach
Chattanooga FC	Chattanooga, Tennessee	Finley Stadium	2009	(United States) Bill Elliott
Detroit City FC	Hamtramck, Michigan	Keyworth Stadium	2012	(England) Trevor James
Michigan Stars FC	Pontiac, Michigan	Ultimate Soccer Arena	1998	(Montenegro) George Juncaj
FC Milwaukee Torrent	Wauwatosa, Wisconsin	Hart Park	2015	(Argentina) Carlos "Cacho" Córdoba
Napa Valley 1839 FC	Napa, California	Dodd Stadium	2016	(United States) Rogelio Ochoa
New York Cosmos	Uniondale, New York	Mitchel Athletic Complex	2010	(United States) Carlos Mendes

Location of the teams

=== Standings ===
Pos	Team	Pld	W	D	L	GF	GA	GD	Pts
1	Detroit City FC (C)	10	8	1	1	17	4	+13	25
2	New York Cosmos	10	7	2	1	22	7	+15	23
3	Chattanooga FC	10	4	2	4	19	10	+9	14
4	FC Milwaukee Torrent	10	3	2	5	10	12	−2	10 (Note: Milwaukee Torrent deducted 1 point for violating a stadium ban)
5	Michigan Stars FC	10	2	2	6	9	17	−8	8
6	Napa Valley 1839 FC	10	1	1	8	5	32	−27	4

Source: NPSL.com
(C) Champions

==== Fixtures and results ====
Home \ Away	CHT	DET	MIC	MIL	NPV	NYC
Chattanooga FC	—	0–1	1–1	2–0	3–0	0–1
Detroit City FC	2–1	—	2–0	0–1	3–0	1–1
Michigan Stars FC	1–4	0–1	—	1–0	2–0	0–2
Milwaukee Torrent	1–1	0–1	2–1	—	2–0	1–2
Napa Valley 1839 FC	0–6	0–4	3–3	2–1	—	0–7
New York Cosmos	3–1	1–2	2–0	2–2	1–0	—

Source: NPSL.com
Legend: Blue = home team win; Yellow = draw; Red = away team win.
