= Trevor Amann =

American soccer player (born 1998)

Personal information
- Date of birth: May 3, 1998 (age 28)
- Place of birth: Westminster, Colorado, United States
- Height: 6 ft 1 in (1.85 m)
- Position: Forward

Team information
- Current team: Pittsburgh Riverhounds
- Number: 7

College career
Years	Team	Apps	(Gls)
2016–2017	Colorado Mines Orediggers	39	(21)
2018–2021	Midwestern State Mustangs	51	(28)

Senior career*
Years	Team	Apps	(Gls)
2018	Detroit City	8	(5)
2021	Denton Diablos	7	(6)
2022–2023	Northern Colorado Hailstorm	57	(28)
2024–2025	Sacramento Republic	39	(11)
2025	FC Tulsa	13	(0)
2026–	Pittsburgh Riverhounds	28	(9)
- * Club domestic league appearances and goals as of November 7, 2026

Trevor Amann (born May 3, 1998) is an American professional soccer player who currently plays for USL Championship club Pittsburgh Riverhounds.

== Career ==
=== Youth ===
Amann attended Shattuck-St. Mary's School in Faribault, Minnesota, where he scored 16 goals over the final two prep campaigns, earning team Offensive MVP honors, and a second-team all-conference mention in each of his freshman and sophomore seasons.

=== College and amateur ===
In 2016, Amann attended Colorado School of Mines to play college soccer. In two seasons with the Orediggers, Amann made 39 appearances, scoring 21 goals and tallying seven assists. In his freshman season he was a Blaster Award winner as Mines Athletics' top male rookie, earned D2CCA Second-Team All-Region, RMAC Freshman of the Year, and First-Team All-RMAC. His sophomore season saw Amann named United Soccer Coaches Second-Team All-Region, and named First-Team All-RMAC for a second consecutive season.

Amann transferred to Midwestern State University in 2017, where he continued his scoring, netting 28 goals in 51 appearances with the Mustangs. He twice won All-Lone Star Conference, LSC Player of the Year, and LSC Forward of the Year. In his senior year he was named D2CCA All-American, United Soccer Coaches All-Region, United Soccer Coaches All-American, D2CCA All-Region, and D2CCA South Central Region Player of the Year.

While at college, Amann also played in the NPSL. In 2018, he made eight regular season appearances for Detroit City, scoring five goals, finishing as Detroit's leading scorer. In 2021, he played with Denton Diablos, scoring six goals in seven regular season games, before scoring a further 11 goals in the playoffs. Amann was named NPSL National Championship Man of the Match in the 2021 NPSL National Championship game, where Denton beat Tulsa Athletic 5–2 to become champions.

=== Professional ===
On January 4, 2022, Amann signed his first professional contract with USL League One club Northern Colorado Hailstorm ahead of their inaugural season. He made his professional debut on April 6, 2022, appearing as a substitute during an extra-time win in the Lamar Hunt U.S. Open Cup over Colorado Springs Switchbacks.

Throughout the 2023 regular season, Amann scored a league-record of 23 goals – 14 of which through braces – , winning the League One's Golden Boot and Player of the Year awards as a result.

On November 13, 2023, it was announced that Amann had signed with USL Championship side Sacramento Republic for the 2024 season. Amann was transferred to FC Tulsa on July 31, 2025.

On January 19, 2026, it was announced that Amann had signed with USL Championship side Pittsburgh Riverhounds SC for the 2026 season with an option for the 2027 season.

== Personal life ==
Amann is the son of Keith and Wendy Amann.

== Honors ==
=== Club ===
Denton Diablos

- NPSL: 2021

=== Individual ===
- USL League One Golden Boot: 2023
- USL League One Player of the Year: 2023
