= Naples United FC =

- Full name: Naples United Football Club
- Founded: 2017; 9 years ago
- Ground: Paradise Coast Sports Complex
- Club Director: Enoch Showunmi
- Founder and CEO: Vicente Sandoval
- League: National Premier Soccer League
- 2019: Regular Season: 2nd Sunshine Conference; Playoffs: Semi-finals Sunshine Conference
- Website: naplesunited.com
Home colours

Naples United Football Club is an American semi-professional soccer club based in Naples, Florida, that that competes in the U.S. Open Cup and plays in the National Premier Soccer League, the top semi-professional soccer league in the United States.

== History ==
Naples United Football Club joined the National Premier Soccer League for its 2017 season. During their first season, the club finished last in the Sunshine Conference, winning just 1 of their 11 matches. The next season, in 2018, Naples United FC finished in 5th in the conference, once again failing to qualify for the playoffs.

In 2019 season, the club managed to finish in their highest ever position in the Sunshine Conference, finishing in 2nd place and qualifying for the Sunshine Conference Playoffs. However, during the playoffs, the club was defeated in the first round by Miami United FC. Despite the defeat, Naples United FC's results in 2019 allowed them to qualify for the 2020 U.S. Open Cup, the top domestic cup competition in American soccer.

In the 2021 season, they would be crowned champions for the first time in the NPSL Sunshine Conference by beating Miami United 4-1 in the final. This success would be repeated in the 2022 season by beating CF Panthers SC, and also in 2023 by finishing in 1st place in the regular season, and placing 4th among 91 teams nationwide. Thus achieving their third consecutive championship in the Florida conference.

== Statistics and records ==
=== Season-by-season ===
As of July 6, 2024

Season	NPSL								Finals	Cup	CONCACAF
Season	P	W	D	L	GF	GA	Pts	Position	Finals	Cup	CONCACAF
2017	11	1	1	9	9	23	4	7th	DNQ	—	—
2018	12	5	1	6	9	16	15	5th	DNQ	DNQ	—
2019	10	8	0	2	24	7	24	2nd	Conference Semi-finals	DQ	—
2021	10	5	3	2	34	24	18	2nd	Regional Semi-finals	COVID-19 cancellation	—
2022	10	4	4	2	22	11	14	4th	Regional Semi-finals	DNQ	—
2023	10	9	0	1	36	14	27	1st	Regional Semi-finals	2nd Qualifying Round	—
2024	10	7	1	2	27	8	22	1st	Conference Semi-finals	DNQ	—
2025	10	7	1	2	35	9	23	2nd	Conference Finals	2nd Qualifying Round	—
2026	Played independent schedule									DNQ	—
2027										2nd Qualifying Round	—

== See also ==
- National Premier Soccer League
