= Demize NPSL =

American amateur soccer club

- Full name: Demize NPSL
- Founded: 2014; 12 years ago as Joplin Demize
- Stadium: Cooper Stadium; Springfield, Missouri
- Capacity: 1,000
- Owners: Ed & Alison Hershewe
- Head Coach: Guilherme Ferreira
- League: National Premier Soccer League
- 2019: Heartland Conference: 3rd Playoffs: Conference Final
- Website: http://www.demizesoccer.com/

Demize NPSL, formerly known as Joplin Demize, is an American amateur soccer club based in Springfield, Missouri, which began play in the fourth-tier National Premier Soccer League (NPSL) in May 2014. The team competes within the Heartland Conference in the NPSL's South Region and plays home games at Lake Country Soccer's Cooper Stadium. It formerly played in the now dissolved South Central Conference.

== History ==
Joplin Demize was announced as an National Premier Soccer League expansion team on January 31, 2014. Ed and Alison Hershewe, who also own a Joplin-based law firm, were announced as owners while former NPSL & PDL player Chris Hanlon would serve as both head coach and Director of Soccer Operations. It was also announced that the team would play home games at the Joplin Athletic Complex.

The team, a developmental extension of the Springfield Demize of the third-tier USL Pro league, is composed of local collegiate and other players from the Four State Area. To fill out the opening day roster, the Demize held open tryouts in March 2014.

On March 9, 2017, the team re-branded as "Demize NPSL," and announced its intent to play games in Branson, Springfield, as well as Joplin.

During the 2019 season, the team finished its regular season third place in conference with its best record to date and qualified for the postseason for the first time in its history. In the Heartland Conference Semifinals, Demize won its first playoff game when it beat the Little Rock Rangers on penalty kicks after both teams played to a 1–1 draw. Demize then fell to Tulsa Athletic, 2–0, in the Conference Final.

== Stadia ==
- Hershewe Soccer Complex, Joplin, Missouri (2014-2017)
- Lake Country Soccer Cooper Stadium, Springfield, Missouri (2017–present)
- Joplin High School, Joplin, Missouri (2017)
- Branson High School Pirate Stadium, Branson, Missouri (2017-2018)
- Waynesville High School, Waynesville, Missouri (2018)

== Year-by-year ==
Year	League	Regular season	Playoffs	U.S. Open Cup	Notes
2014	NPSL	3rd, North Division (South Central Conference)	did not qualify	Ineligible	
2015	NPSL	5th, South Central Conference	did not qualify	did not qualify	
2016	NPSL	10th, South Central Conference	did not qualify	did not qualify	
2017	NPSL	5th, Heartland Conference	did not qualify	did not qualify	
2018	NPSL	5th, Heartland Conference	did not qualify	did not qualify	
2019	NPSL	3rd, Heartland Conference	Conference Final	did not qualify	Lost to Tulsa Athletic in the Conference Final
2020	NPSL	Season cancelled due to COVID-19 pandemic			
2021	NPSL	1st, Heartland Conference	Conference Final	did not qualify	Lost to Tulsa Athletic in the Conference Final
2022	NPSL	4th, Heartland Conference	Conference Semifinals	did not qualify	Lost to Tulsa Athletic in the Conference Semifinals
2023	NPSL	4th, Heartland Conference	Conference Semifinals	did not qualify	Lost to Tulsa Athletic in the Conference Semifinals
