= Georgia Storm FC =

- Full name: Georgia Storm FC
- Nickname: The Storm
- Founded: 2020; 6 years ago
- Stadium: University of West Georgia Soccer Field; Carrollton, Georgia
- Capacity: 500
- Coordinates: 33.5643198,-85.0837066
- Owner: Bill Rucker
- General Manager: Stephen Bivens
- Manager: Josh Bivens
- League: National Premier Soccer League
- Website: http://www.georgiastormfc.com/
Home colors	Away colors	Third colors

Georgia Storm Mascot
- First seen: December 2020

Georgia Storm FC is an American soccer club, currently on hiatus, based in Carrollton, Georgia, United States. The team competed in the Southeast Conference of the National Premier Soccer League (NPSL), the fourth tier of the United States soccer league system. The NPSL is officially affiliated to the United States Adult Soccer Association (USASA) and qualifies for the US Open Cup.

== History ==
=== Inaugural Season ===
Georgia Storm FC played their inaugural match on May 1, 2021, against Georgia Revolution, resulting in a 1–0 loss at home in Carrollton. Georgia Storm achieved its first goals and victory in the National Premier Soccer League (NPSL) on May 15 against LSA Athletico Lanier. The first goal was an own goal and the second was a header off a set piece late in the second half by Stephen Bivens assisted by Andrew Carleton. Including the win against LSA Lanier, the Storm went on a five-game unbeaten streak. Their first road loss was at North Alabama SC on June 12. This match was followed by a win on June 19 against the same North Alabama side. On June 26, Georgia Storm scored 14 goals in a Fabian Pekruhl clean sheet against Metro Louisville, which included six goals by Stephen Bivens, four by Wilfried Kamdem Tchoupa, two by Avery Shepard, and once each by Jeisson Palencia and Jacob Bivens. Georgia Storm ended conference play against Appalachian FC in Boone, NC, falling at the end 3–2 in front of 1,100 in attendance. The team finished in second place in the conference and thus made the playoffs. The first playoff match was played in Carrollton against Appalachian FC, resulting in a 2–1 victory with goals from Andrew Carleton and Wilfried Kamden Tchoupa. In the conference championship against Georgia Revolution FC, a 2–1 loss ended the inaugural season. Due to the team's success, a spot in the qualifying rounds of the US Open Cup was obtained.

The 2021 roster included three former MLS players, including Hunter Jumper, Kevin Barajas, and Andrew Carleton.

Fabian Pekruhl, Stephen Bivens, and Wilfried Kamdem Tchoupa were named to the 2021 NPSL Southeast Conference Best XI.

Georgia Storm FC played in their first ever US Open Cup match on October 16 against Georgia Revolution at Luella High School. The match was tied until the second half, when Revolution's Christian Duncan converted his first. Deep into stoppage time, Gerard Forges scored from close range, assisted by Stephen Bivens to send the match to added time. The Storm struck early in added time with Jacob Bivens netting a header before a last effort strike by Duncan sent the game to penalty kicks. Georgia Revolution converted all their kicks and won the match 2–2 (4–2).

=== 2022 Season ===
==== Pre-season ====
The Storm opened its account in 2022 with a pre-season friendly with Atlanta United on Tuesday, January 25 at 11AM in a closed-door friendly at Children's Healthcare of Atlanta Training Ground. It was the first preseason match of the year for both clubs. After three minutes, Atlanta United attacker Luiz Araujo beat several players to create space for Erik Centeno who cut back and shot towards goal when Fabian Pekruhl made the save, but Tyler Wolff finished to give Atlanta United a 1–0 advantage. At the fifteen-minute mark, Storm delivered a corner from the right-hand side that was cleared up the line by Tyler Wolff to Luiz Araujo who drove forward towards Storm's defense before sliding a pass through to Jackson Conway who finished it off to put Atlanta United ahead 2–0 at halftime. In the second half, Storm played into the match, creating a few half-chances. With minutes left to play, Andrew Carleton drove into the left edge of the box where he cut back and had his shot towards the goal blocked by a sliding defender. As a highlight on the day, Storm's Youth Academy player, Isaac Cruz, made his first team debut in the final moments. On the day, Storm had 4 current Youth Academy players from its U16 National League PRO team earning their first experience with Storm's First Team. Joining Isaac were Nyckolas Waits, Wyatt Mathis-Kline and Jon Smith.

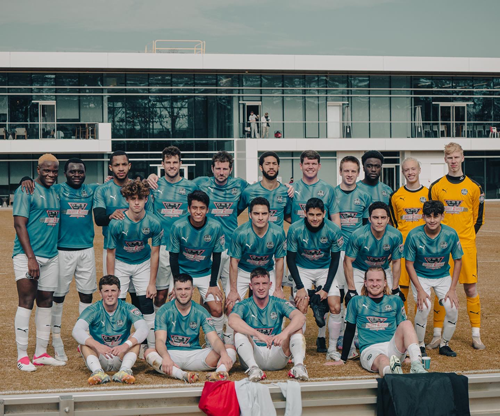
Georgia Storm game roster for preseason friendly with Atlanta United FC in January 2022

==== Regular season ====
The Storm took a step back in 2022 recording a record of 2-7-1 with wins vs. LSA Lanier and Apotheos FC.

== Stadium ==
- University of West Georgia Soccer Field; Carrollton, GA (2021-current)

Georgia Storm FC played their 2021 inaugural season at Carrollton High School's Grisham Stadium before moving to the West Georgia soccer field for 2022.

== Training Ground ==
- Alexander High School (2022)
- New Manchester High School (2021)

== Colors and Badge ==
In December 2020, on the heels of the launch of the team in the National Premier Soccer League in the Southeast Conference, the club launched a search for a new logo that would represent the club and its community as it moved into the semi-professional ranks. The color scheme was black, gold, white, and a light blue to represent the club. They announced the new logo on December 22, 2021. For the community, it represents playing in the state of Georgia, as well as its primary three cities of Carrollton, Douglasville, and Villa Rica being represented by the three gold stars. The antlers represent the White Tail Deer, which is official state animal. The Storm wordmark represents the values of Storm in power, passion, and unrelenting strength. Lastly, the symbol is a show of strength as they can weather any storm.

=== Kits ===
For its first season, Georgia Storm adopted the Puma Cup Jersey for its first team and U23s.

=== Kit Sponsors ===
On April 8, 2021, the team announced Scott Evans Auto Group as its primary jersey sponsor for the first team. The terms and length of the contract were not disclosed. Later in April, the team announced RedMed Urgent Clinic and GreyStone Power Corporation as sponsors for the back of the kit below the number. Soon after in May, Hacienda San Antonio Mexican Taqueria was announced as the primary training jersey sponsor for the team.

Season	Kit Brand	Kit Sponsor	Industry	Sponsors
2021-2022	Puma	Scott Evans Carrollton	Automobile Sales	Red Med Urgent Clinic, Hacienda San Antonio Mexican Taqueria, GreyStone Power Corp., Brown Dog Eatery, City Tavern, Reeves Insurance

== Rivalries ==
In its first year, the Storm formed a strong rivalry with Georgia Revolution from their inaugural match. In the first year of the rivalry, the teams faced off three times, including in the Southeast Conference Championship game. It's a fierce battle between two top competitors in the National Premier Soccer League.

== Players and staff ==
=== Current roster ===
As of April 4, 2023

Note: Flags indicate national team as defined under FIFA eligibility rules; some limited exceptions apply. Players may hold more than one non-FIFA nationality.

No.	Pos.	Nation	Player
—	GK	USA	Robert Bailey
—	GK	USA	MJ Upchurch
—	DEF	USA	Andy Elkins
—	DEF	USA	Alex Chmelo
—	DEF	USA	Greg Stratton
—	DEF	COL	Nicolas Salazar Bonilla
—	DEF	USA	Hayden Binfield
—	DEF	USA	Andy Guzman
—	DEF	BRA	Julio Neto
—	DEF	USA	Alek Bravo
—	DEF	GHA	Omarion Dankyi
—	MF	USA	Kevin Pierre
—	MF	BRB	Justin White
—	MF	PER	Pedro Valenzuela

No.	Pos.	Nation	Player
—	MF	USA	Spencer Van Buskirk
—	MF	BRA	Renan Diniz
—	MF	USA	Ian Farquhar
—	MF	BRA	Hugo Lorenzo
—	MF	USA	Curtis Ketchup
—	FWD	FRA	Matteo Landais
—	FWD	USA	Alex Guzman
—	FWD	FRA	Lucas Bedleg
—	FWD	CRC	Mauro Gutierrez
—	FWD	USA	Akinni James
—	MF	USA	Ryan Antoine
—	FWD	USA	Haris Osmanbasic
—	FWD	ENG	Luke Holmes
—	FWD	USA	Jacob Antoine

=== Notable Former Players ===
Name	Nationality	Current Team	Current League
Hunter Jumper	United States	Free agent	
Andrew Carleton	United States	Las Vegas Lights	USL Championship
Kevin Barajas	United States	Free agent	
Stephen Bivens	United States	Georgia Storm GM	National Premier Soccer League
Fabian Pekruhl	Germany	SC Verl	3. Liga

=== Academy Graduates ===
Note: Flags indicate national team as defined under FIFA eligibility rules; some limited exceptions apply. Players may hold more than one non-FIFA nationality.

No.	Pos.	Nation	Player
—	DF	USA	Jacob Bivens
—	MF	USA	Isaac Cruz

No.	Pos.	Nation	Player
—	MF	HON	Henry Hernandez
—	FW	USA	Jacob Antoine

=== Technical staff ===
Position	Name
Head coach	(United States) Joshua Bivens
Assistant coach	(United States) Sasan Lak
Assistant coach	(Haiti) Gerard Forges

== Records ==
=== Seasons ===
Champion Runner-Up

NPSL

Season	Domestic League								U.S. Open Cup	Head coach
Season	GP	W	D	L	Pts	Conference	Pos.	Playoffs	U.S. Open Cup	Head coach
2021	10	5	2	3	17	Southeast	Conference Runner-ups	Did not qualify	Qualification Round	(United States) Joshua Bivens
2022	10	2	1	7	7	Southeast	6th Place	Did not qualify	Did not qualify	(United States) Joshua Bivens
2023	10	2	2	6	8	Southeast	6th Place	Did not qualify	Did not qualify	(United States) Joshua Bivens

=== Goals ===
Rank	Name	NPSL Reg. Season	Conf. Playoffs	US Open Cup	Total
1	(United States) Stephen Bivens	12	1	0	13
2	(Cameroon) Wilfried Kamdem-Tchoupa	5	1	0	6
3	(United States) Andrew Carleton	4	1	0	5
4	(Republic of Ireland) Kevin Fitzgerald	4	0	0	4
5	(United States) Avery Shepard	3	0	0	3
5	(France) Tony Barry	3	0	0	3
6	(United States) Jacob Bivens	1	0	1	2
6	(Costa Rica) Mauro Gutierrez	2	0	0	2
6	(Nigeria) Ayomide Gabriel Salako	2	0	0	2
7	(Italy) Matteo Olivotto	1	0	0	1
7	(Colombia) Jeisson Palencia	1	0	0	1
7	(Mexico) Ian Alvarez	1	0	0	1
7	(Venezuela) Juan Gutierrez	1	0	0	1
7	(United States) Haris Osmanbasic	1	0	0	1
7	(United States) Andy Elkins	1	0	0	1
7	(United States) Akinni James	1	0	0	1
7	(United States) Greg Stratton	1	0	0	1
7	(United States) Spencer Van Buskirk	1	0	0	1
7	(United States) Andy Guzman	1	0	0	1
7	(United States) Kevin Pierre	1	0	0	1
7	(Haiti) Gerard Forges	0	0	1	1

=== Cleansheets ===
Rank	Name	NPSL Reg. Season	Conf. Playoffs	US Open Cup	Total
1	(Germany) Fabian Pekruhl	3	0	0	3
2	(Netherlands) Bas Markus	1	0	0	1

== Honors ==
=== Domestic trophies ===
- National Premier Soccer League Southeast Conference
  - Runners-Up (silver) : 2021

== Club culture ==
=== Supporters ===
The supporter group of Georgia Storm FC is The Storm Chasers. The group is the core of the home fans, travels to away games, and promotes the team to the community.

=== Affiliates ===
- Villa Rica Soccer Association, Villa Rica, Georgia
- Darlington Soccer Academy, Rome, Georgia
- MAYSA Storm, Madison, Georgia
- Lake Country United FC, Eatonton, Georgia

== Development System ==
=== U23 Team ===
Georgia Storm fields a U23 team in the UPSL to bridge our Youth Academy to our First team, which competes in the Southeast Conference Georgia Div. I.

The Georgia Storm Soccer Academy provides recreation, academy, and select programs for almost 2,000 youth players, mostly in the Carroll County and Douglas County areas of western Georgia. Storm teams participate in the USYS National League, Club Champions League, Georgia Premier League, and are affiliated with Georgia Soccer.

==== U23 Stadium ====
- New Manchester High School Stadium, Douglasville, Georgia

=== UPSL Records ===
Champion Runner-Up

Georgia Storm U23

Season	Domestic League									U.S. Open Cup	Head coach
Season	Division	GP	W	D	L	Pts	Conference	Pos.	Playoffs	U.S. Open Cup	Head coach
Spring 2021	1	10	7	1	2	22	Southeast - Georgia	Conference Runner-ups	N/A	Ineligible	(United States) Matt Brooks

=== Youth Academy ===
Georgia Storm FC youth academy teams participate in United States Youth Soccer Association under United States Soccer Federation where they have teams from recreational (3 to 19 year olds) to Youth Academy (9 to 19 year olds) to Amateur for the adults in the community. In its Youth Academy, they have teams that participate in USYS National League in the Piedmont Conference where they have won 3 consecutive titles in the 2006 boys division. At the state level, they have won 3 Georgia Soccer State Cups as well as 1 finalist medal. On the girls side, the 2004 girls won the 2021 title, and on the boys, the 2006 boys won the 2021 and 2020 title. The 2006 boys team was semi-finalist at the 2021 Region III Southern Championships in Greenville, South Carolina at the MESA Soccer Complex. For the 2022 Southern Regional Championships, their youth academy has both the 2006 boys and 2004 girls qualified for the event in June. The 2006 boys also compete in the USYS National League PRO league where the top 64 teams in the country compete.

==== Youth Training Grounds ====
- East Carroll Park, Carrollton, Georgia
- Chestnut Log, Douglasville, Georgia
- Boundary Waters, Douglasville, Georgia
- Fowler Park, Douglasville, Georgia
- Fullerville Park, Villa Rica, Georgia
- Alexander High School, Douglasville, Georgia
- Carrollton High School Indoor Facility, Carrollton, Georgia

== Broadcasting ==
Georgia Storm FC uses Eleven Sports to broadcast all of its home matches.
