= Andrew Carleton =

American soccer player (born 2000)

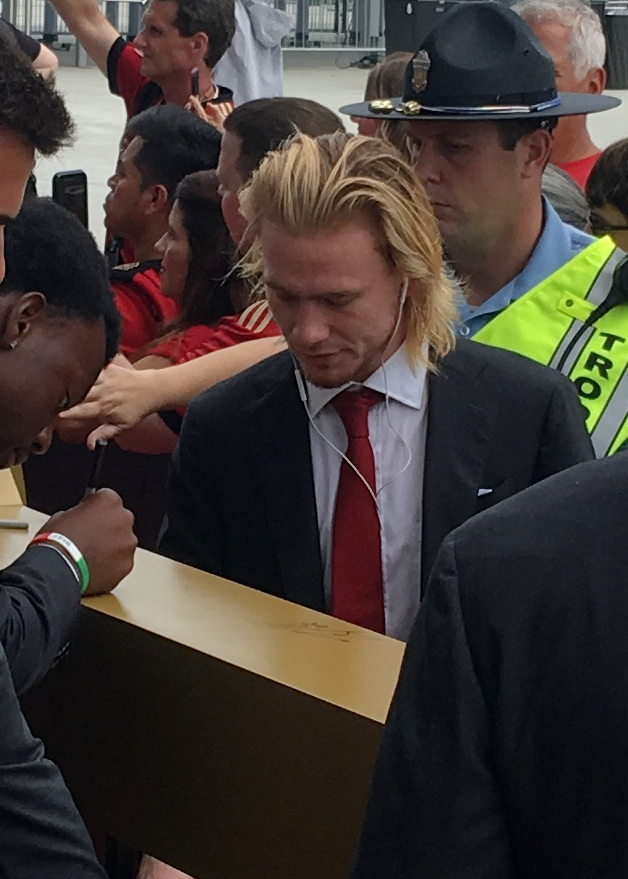
- Carleton at an Atlanta United event in 2018

Personal information
- Full name: Andrew James Carleton
- Date of birth: June 22, 2000 (age 26)
- Place of birth: Powder Springs, Georgia, U.S.
- Height: 1.70 m (5 ft 7 in)
- Position: Winger

Youth career
- 2016: Georgia United

Senior career*
Years	Team	Apps	(Gls)
2016–2020	Atlanta United	11	(0)
2018–2020	→ Atlanta United 2	29	(7)
2016	→ Charleston Battery (loan)	3	(0)
2020	→ Indy Eleven (loan)	14	(1)
2021	Georgia Storm	9	(4)
2021	Jicaral Sercoba	1	(0)
2021	Kalonji Pro-Profile	2	(0)
2022	San Diego Loyal	27	(1)
2023	Las Vegas Lights	27	(2)
Total		123	(15)

International career
2015	United States U15	8	(6)
2015–2017	United States U17	15	(12)
2015	United States U18	4	(1)
2019	United States U20	2	(1)
- * Club domestic league appearances and goals

Andrew James Carleton (born June 22, 2000) is an American former professional soccer player.

== Early life ==
Carleton was born in Powder Springs, Georgia and played for Georgia United at the youth level.

Carleton has two brothers named Alan and Johnny and two sisters named Erin and Erica. Alan signed with Atlanta United 2 in 2023.

== Professional career ==
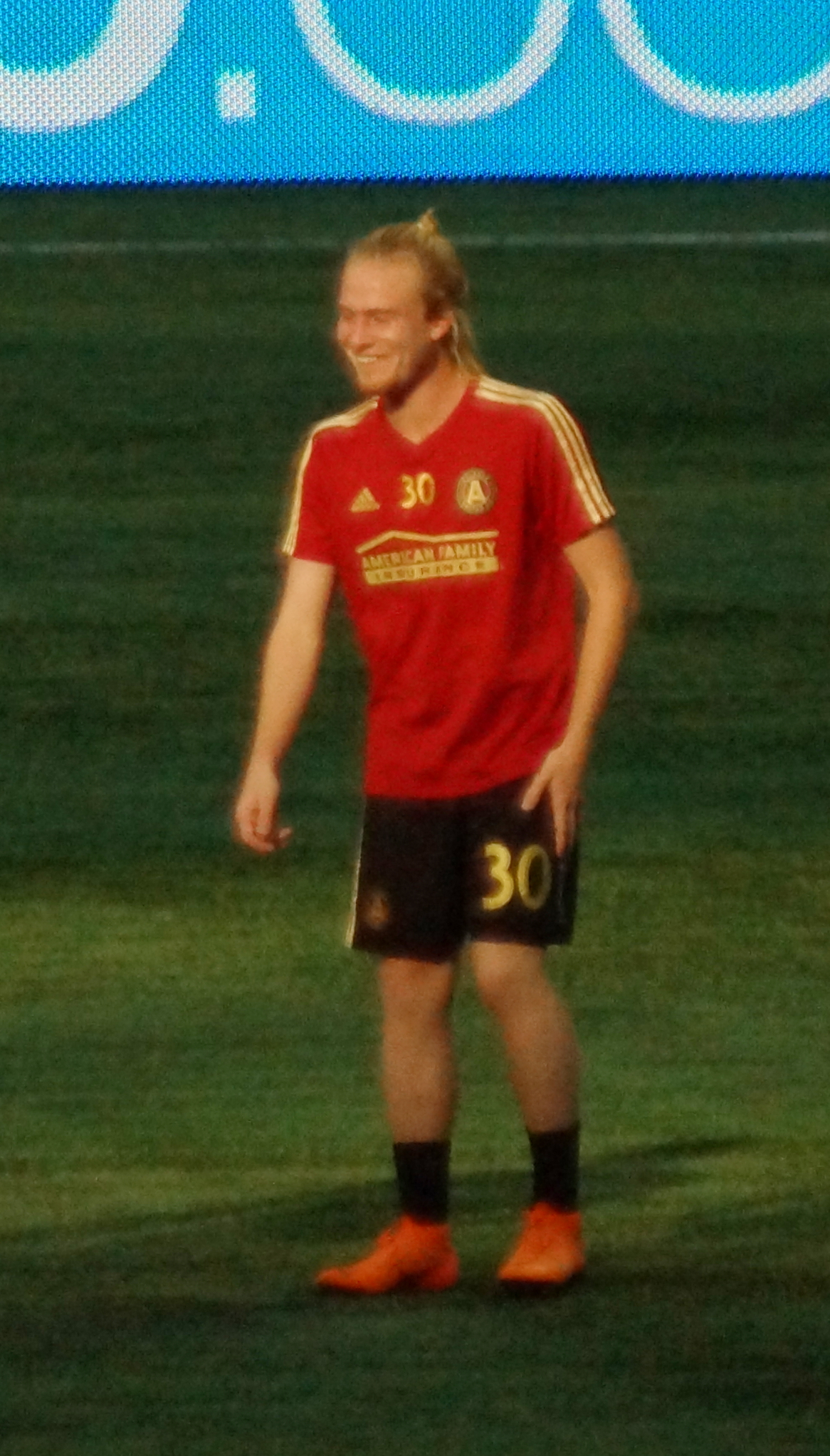
Andrew Carleton playing for Atlanta United 2 on June 2, 2018

On June 9, 2016, Carleton signed with Major League Soccer side Atlanta United FC as the new team's first ever Homegrown Player. He spent the 2016 season on loan with United Soccer League side Charleston Battery. He made his first appearance on September 7, 2016, against FC Montreal. On September 10, 2016, Carleton became the youngest American professional player in history to start a USL match. On September 17, 2016, Carleton recorded his first professional assist for the Battery.

On February 11, 2017, he made his debut for Atlanta United and scored during the second half of the team's first preseason game against Chattanooga FC. Carleton made his MLS debut on May 20, 2017, as an 85th minute substitution against Houston Dynamo. The 16-year-old was given a standing ovation at a sold out Bobby Dodd Stadium. Andrew provided his first career assist in a 4–1 win against Vancouver on March 17, 2018.

On April 21, 2018, while on loan to Atlanta United 2, Carleton scored his first professional goal, a penalty kick in a 1–1 draw against Louisville City FC. He scored his first goal with Atlanta United's first team on June 6, 2018, vs Charleston Battery in the US Open Cup.

On January 24, 2020, Carleton was loaned to USL Championship side Indy Eleven for the 2020 season. When the season ended, Carleton was released by Atlanta United.

In April 2021, Carleton joined Georgia Storm FC ahead of their first National Premier Soccer League season.

On September 11, 2021, Carleton joined Costa Rican first division club Jicaral Sercoba.

In December 2021, Carleton returned to United States to play with United Premier Soccer League club Kalonji Pro-Profile.

Carleton returned to the professional game on March 9, 2022, signing with USL Championship side San Diego Loyal. He was released by San Diego following the 2022 season.

Carleton signed with Las Vegas Lights on January 25, 2023.

=== Discipline issues ===
In 2018, Carleton was among the rising youth players within the Atlanta United organization. He had seen significant playing time and had been included in the matchday squad several times. However, on the eve of the 2018 MLS Cup championship game, local news media reported that Carleton had broken team curfew/rules and posted photos while drinking with friends in an Atlanta bar. This prompted disciplinary action by manager Tata Martino, who banned Carleton from dressing for the game. Carleton was also not allowed to participate in the celebration parade the following week by club management.

In early 2019, new Atlanta United manager Frank de Boer made statements to the media regarding Carleton's lack of maturity and professionalism, saying "He still has to grow up as a man." On June 26, 2019, Atlanta United was left one man short on the bench for an away match against Toronto FC when Carleton forgot his passport on the trip to Canada. Two days later, manager Frank de Boer announced Andrew would play with the reserve team until he showed improvements in his professionalism. "He's joining the USL team right now... I have no worries about his quality, but more the professional side,” said de Boer.

== Career statistics ==
As of June 6, 2018

Club	Season	League		League Cup		Domestic Cup		Continental		Total	
Club	Season	Apps	Goals	Apps	Goals	Apps	Goals	Apps	Goals	Apps	Goals
Charleston Battery	2016	3	0	1	0	0	0	0	0	4	0
Charleston Battery	Total	3	0	1	0	0	0	0	0	4	0
Atlanta United	2017	1	0	0	0	1	0	0	0	2	0
Atlanta United	2018	6	0	0	0	1	1	0	0	7	1
Atlanta United	2019	3	0	0	0	1	0	0	0	4	0
Total		10	0	0	0	3	1	0	0	13	1
Atlanta United 2	2018	14	2	0	0	0	0	0	0	14	2
Atlanta United 2	2019	15	5	0	0	0	0	0	0	15	5
Total		29	7	0	0	0	0	0	0	29	7
Career total		42	7	1	0	3	1	0	0	46	8

== Honors ==
=== Club ===
==== Atlanta United ====
- MLS Cup: 2018

=== Continental ===
- Campeones Cup
  - Winner: 2019
