= Golden Gate Conference =

NPSL Golden Gate Conference
- Founded: 2014; 12 years ago
- Country: United States
- Confederation: CONCACAF; U.S. Soccer
- Number of clubs: 8
- Level on pyramid: 4 (US) (unofficial)
- Domestic cup: U.S. Open Cup
- Current champions: FC Davis
- Most championships: Sonoma County Sol (2 titles)
- Website: npsl.bonzidev.com

The NPSL Golden Gate Conference is a division within the National Premier Soccer League. It consists of teams from Northern California.

== Teams ==
- Academica SC
- El Farolito
- FC Davis
- Napa Valley 1839 FC
- Project 51O
- Sacramento Gold
- Sonoma County Sol

== Champions ==
- 2014: Sacramento Gold
- 2015: Sonoma County Sol
- 2016: Sonoma County Sol
- 2017: CD Aguiluchos USA
- 2018: El Farolito
- 2019: FC Davis
- 2020: Season cancelled
