= Club Atletico Saint Louis =

- Full name: Club Atletico Saint Louis
- Nickname: The Bluebirds
- Founded: 2016; 10 years ago
- Stadium: SLUH Soccer Stadium; St. Louis, Missouri
- President: Lisa Garza
- Head coach: Ricardo Garza
- League: National Premier Soccer League
- 2019: Heartland Conference: 6th Playoffs: DNQ
- Website: https://www.gobluebirds.com/

Club Atletico Saint Louis is an American soccer team based in St. Louis, Missouri. It plays within the National Premier Soccer League (NPSL), a national amateur league at the fourth tier of the American Soccer Pyramid, in the South Region's Heartland Conference.

== History ==
Originally founded as a youth clinic in 2016, Saint Louis Club Atletico was announced as the National Premier Soccer League's newest expansion team on January 3, 2018, with plans to begin play in the league's upcoming 2018 season in the Heartland Conference. The team announced it would be playing home matches at St. Mary's Stadium in South St. Louis.

Saint Louis played its inaugural game on May 12 on the road against NPSL powerhouse FC Wichita. Despite taking an early lead, the team lost, 4–2, with Chevaughn Walsh scoring the first two goals in team history in the 3rd and 21st minutes respectively. One week later Atletico played its first home match on May 19 against Ozark FC, drawing the visitors 1–1 at St. Mary's High School with Walsh scoring his third goal of the season.

Saint Louis finished the regular season fourth in the Heartland Conference with a record of 5-1-4 (16 pts), enough to earn the team a spot in the conference's playoff tournament. On July 11, Atletico lost, 4–0, on the road in a rematch of the season opener to top seed and defending conference champion FC Wichita.

Ahead of its sophomore season, the team underwent a minor re-branding and began to play under the name Club Atletico Saint Louis.

== Record ==
=== Year-by-year ===
Year	League	Regular season	Playoffs	U.S. Open Cup	Notes
2018	NPSL	4th, Heartland Conference	Conference Semifinal	Ineligible	Lost in Conference Semifinal to FC Wichita
2019	NPSL	6th, Heartland Conference	did not qualify	did not qualify	
2020	NPSL	Season cancelled due to COVID-19 pandemic			

== Logo history ==
Saint Louis Club Atletico
(2018)

Club Atletico Saint Louis
(2019–)

== Notable players ==
Hamza Elias
Kaleb Jackson
Chevaughn Walsh
Anthony Brown
Jair Hernandez
