= Denton Diablos FC =

Denton Diablos
- Full name: Denton Diablos Football Club
- Nickname: Diablos
- Founded: 2018; 8 years ago
- Stadium: Mean Green Soccer Stadium; Denton, Texas
- Capacity: 1,000
- Owner: Michael Hitchcock; Damon Gochneaur
- Technical Staff: General Manager & Technical Director: Brad Namdar; Head Coach: Roy Lassiter
- League: USL League Two
- Website: dentondiablos.com
Home colors	Away colors

Denton Diablos FC is an American semi-professional soccer club based in Denton, Texas. Founded in 2018, the club plays in the Ranger Division of USL League Two (USL2).

== History ==
In September 2018, the Diablos were announced as an National Premier Soccer League (NPSL) expansion side to play in the South Region's Lone Star Conference.

The club was founded through a partnership between Damon Gochneaur, owner of the Denton-based Aspiro Agency, and Michael Hitchcock, owner of Playbook Management International and fellow NPSL side Fort Worth Vaqueros FC. On October 2, 2018, the team announced Edward S. Marcus High School men's soccer coach Chad Rakestraw as the team's first head coach.

In the team's first season, the club finished second in the Lone Star Conference before falling in the conference semifinals to the Vaqueros.

In January 2020, Denton was announced as one of 14 NPSL clubs that would take part in the 2020 U.S. Open Cup, but due to the COVID-19 pandemic, the tournament was canceled along with the 2020 NPSL season.

On October 23, 2020, Denton announced Ramón Raya as their new head coach.

In 2021, the Diablos finished first on the Lone Star Conference table with an 8-1-1 record, 2 points ahead of the Laredo Heat. The team won the conference finals against Laredo and would go on a successful playoff run, winning against FC Golden State Force and Cleveland SC. This ultimately led to the championship matchup against Tulsa Athletic, which the Diablos won 5-2 in front of their home crowd in Denton.

In the 2022 season, the team failed to make the playoffs by 1 point, finishing the season 7-4-1. Due to the previous cancelation of the 2020 U.S. Open Cup, Denton made their first appearance in the competition in 2022, losing to a local qualifier (D'Feeters Kicks Soccer Club) in the 1st round. Additionally, the Diablos were chosen to be the NPSL representative in the 2022 Hank Steinbrecher Cup as a result of their 2021 NPSL championship. They lost to USL2 member Flint City Bucks 2-1 in the Cup Final.

=== Year-by-year results ===
Year	League	Regular season	Playoffs	U.S. Open Cup
2019	NPSL	2nd, Lone Star Conference	Conference Semifinal	Ineligible
2020	NPSL	Season Cancelled, Competed in Local Roja League	Not Held	Not Held
2021	NPSL	1st, Lone Star Conference	League Champions	Not Held
2022	NPSL	5th, Lone Star Conference	Ineligible	1st Round
2023	NPSL	6th, Lone Star Conference	Ineligible	Ineligible
2024	NPSL	3rd, Lone Star Conference	Conference Final	Ineligible
2025	USL2	4th, Mid South Division	Ineligible	Ineligible
2026	USL2	2nd, Ranger Division	Ineligible	Fourth Qualifying Round
2027				Third Qualifying Round

== Players & staff ==
=== Ownership ===
- Damon Gochneaur - Aspiro Agency
- Michael Hitchcock - Playbook Management International

=== General Manager & Technical Director ===
- (United States) Brad Namdar (2023–)

=== Head coaches ===
- (United States) Chad Rakestraw (2019–2020)
- (Mexico) Ramón Raya (2020–2023)
- (Venezuela) Armando Pelaez (2023)
- (England) Ben Clarvis (2024)
- (United States) Stewart Flaherty (2025)
- (United States) Roy Lassiter (2026-Present)

== Honors ==
=== League ===
- National Premier Soccer League
  - League Champions: 2021
  - West Region Champions: 2021
  - Lone Star Conference Champions: 2021
- Roja League
  - League Champions: 2020, 2021

=== Cup ===
- U.S. Open Cup
  - Qualifiers: 2022
  - Open Qualification: 2025
- Hank Steinbrecher Cup
  - Runners-up: 2022

=== Other ===
- Chisholm Trail Clásico
  - Champions: 2021, 2022, 2023, 2024
