= Linda Esperanza Marquez High School =

Location
- 6361 Cottage St; Huntington Park, California 90255; United States; 33°58′56″N 118°14′02″W

Information
- Type: public choice, magnet
- Established: 2012
- School district: Los Angeles Unified School District
- Principal: Kyle Boswell (School of Social Justice) Jonathan Chaikittirattana (Huntington Park Institute of Applied Medicine) Nikki Grakal (Libra Academy)
- Grades: 9–12
- Enrollment: 460 (2012–13)
- Campus type: Urban
- Athletics conference: Central League; CIF Los Angeles City Section
- Team name: Gladiators
- Website: www.marquezhs.net

Linda Esperanza Marquez High School (or simply Marquez High School) is a public choice high school in Huntington Park, California that is part of the Los Angeles Unified School District. Marquez High School opened in 2013 as part of LA Unified's $19.5 billion New School Construction and Modernization Program. The school is a Choice site that offers the LIBRA Academy, The Huntington Park Institute of Applied Medicine, and the School of Social Justice.

The campus was designed by Ehrlich Architects (a Culver City firm that won the 2015 AIA Architecture Firm Award) on a 14-acre industrial site, near a freight rail tunnel and a sawmill. Ehrlich first presented the design in 2005, and construction lasted seven years. The Huntington Park community had initially expressed a preference for a Mediterranean style building similar to the city hall building, but the contemporary design was ultimately approved after community review. Designed for 1,620 students, the facility includes a classroom building with separate floors for each of the three schools, with shared facilities around the other sides, all connected by an "internal pedestrian street". The athletic facilities and library are designed to provide community access when not in use by the school.

The site of the school was previously used as a storage yard for used tires, then became a building materials recycling facility that drew community opposition, especially after it was used to store some 600,000 tons of concrete ruins (standing some 60 feet high) from a portion of the Santa Monica Freeway that collapsed in the 1994 Northridge earthquake. Linda Esperanza Marquez, for whom the school is named, is a community activist who fought to have the site (which she called the "mountain of death") cleared and reused.

== Linda Esperanza Marquez ==
Linda Esperanza Marquez was one of the few neighbors in Huntington Park who took action in making a change for the community when the toxic dust from " La Montaña" ("the mountain") was making many living around the area sick. "La Montaña" was made up of concrete rubble that created dangerous amounts of pollution. All of the concrete debris resulted from the 1994 earthquake in Northridge, Los Angeles, California where the devastating 6.7 earthquake resulted in the collapse of homes as well as the Santa Monica Freeway. Unfortunately all the debris was dumped in the community of Huntington Park just across the street of people's homes.

Linda, who lives directly across from it, came to be one of the most vocal community leaders who fought tirelessly to make a needed change in the community. She worked with CBE staff (Communities for Better Environment) as well as other community members to take action. After a lengthy struggle they led a winning campaign in 1996 and in 2004 the cleanup finally began.

Linda led the 20-year campaign to have the toxic concrete debris removed. For her dedication and efforts, a school was named after her. Additionally, she was a special guest at the ribbon cutting ceremony on March 8, 2013.

== Demographics ==
In the 2012–13 school year, Marquez enrolled 460 students and was 0.2% Filipino, 0.2% Black, and 99.6% Hispanic.
