= A.S. Los Angeles =

American soccer team

A.S. Los Angeles FC
- Full name: Association Soccer Los Angeles
- Founded: 2018
- Stadium: Whittier College; Whittier, California
- Owner: Harry Tachian
- League: National Premier Soccer League
- Website: http://aslosangeles.com/

A.S. Los Angeles is an American soccer team based in the Whittier, California that plays in the National Premier Soccer League.

== History ==
Logo as Los Angeles United FC

A.S. Los Angeles was formed in 2018 under the name Los Angeles United FC. They announced they were joining the National Premier Soccer League for the 2019 season. They joined the league under the name A.S. Los Angeles.

== Year-by-year ==
Year	Division	League	Record	Regular season	Playoffs	US Open Cup
2019	4	NPSL	7–8–3	5th, West-Southwest	Did not qualify	Did not qualify
2020	4	NPSL	Season canceled due to COVID-19 Pandemic			
