= Hershey FC =

Hershey SC
- Full name: Hershey Soccer Club
- Founded: 2013; 13 years ago
- Stadium: Hershey High School; Hershey, Pennsylvania
- Capacity: 2,000
- Owner: Hershey Soccer Club
- General Manager: Ben Shirk
- Head coach: Tom Mellor
- League: National Premier Soccer League
- 2024: 6th, Keystone West Conference; Playoffs: DNQ
- Website: hersheysoccer.org
Home colors

Hershey Soccer Club is an American soccer club based in Hershey, Pennsylvania, United States. The club was founded in 2012 to play in the Keystone Conference of the National Premier Soccer League (NPSL), a national amateur league at the fourth tier of the American soccer pyramid.

The team plays some home games at Hersheypark Stadium. The club colors are navy blue and orange.

== History ==
Hershey FC joined the National Premier Soccer League (NPSL), considered the fourth tier of the American soccer pyramid and roughly equal to the USL Premier Development League (PDL), to begin play in the 2013 season. The team represents the top level of the Hershey Soccer Club youth soccer organization. The Panthers played their first game on May 11, 2013, defeating FC Reading Revolution 3-1 in an away match. The Panthers would finish in 5th place of the Keystone Conference in their first season.

In 2023, Hershey FC qualified for their first postseason appearance with a 5-2-3 record, losing in the Keystone West Conference Final to West Chester United SC 2-1.

== Year-by-year ==
Year	Division	League	Regular season	Playoffs	Open Cup
2013	4	NPSL	5th, Keystone	did not qualify	did not qualify
2014	4	NPSL	6th, Keystone	did not qualify	did not qualify
2018	4	NPSL	7th, Keystone	did not qualify	did not qualify
2019	4	NPSL	8th, Keystone	did not qualify	did not qualify
2021	4	NPSL	8th, Keystone	did not qualify	did not qualify
2022	4	NPSL	11th, Keystone	did not qualify	did not qualify
2023	4	NPSL	2nd, Keystone West	Lost Conference Finals	did not qualify
2024	4	NPSL	6th, Keystone West	did not qualify	did not qualify

== Staff ==
=== Head coach ===
- Ian Carter (2013)
- Chris Wilson (2022)
- Rich Bryan (2023-2024)
- Tom Mellor (2024–present)

=== Assistant coaches ===
- David Mellor
