= Anthony Allison (footballer) =

Liberian footballer

Personal information
- Full name: Anthony Allison (formerly Sargbah Tarpeh)
- Date of birth: May 5, 1987 (age 39)
- Place of birth: Liberia
- Height: 5 ft 10 in (1.78 m)
- Position: Forward

Team information
- Current team: Philadelphia Lone Star FC

Youth career
- 2001–2009: Junior Lone Star FC
- 2006–2009: Wilmington Wildcats

Senior career*
Years	Team	Apps	(Gls)
2010	Puerto Rico Islanders	10	(0)
2011	IFK Sundsvall	21	(24)
2012	Härnösands FF	21	(19)
2013	Umeå FC	19	(3)
2014	Frånö SK	20	(25)
2015	Sandvikens IF	24	(20)
2016–	Philadelphia Lone Star	27	(31)
- * Club domestic league appearances and goals as of 13 May 2019

Anthony Allison (born May 5, 1987) is a Liberian footballer who currently plays for Philadelphia Lone Star FC in the National Premier Soccer League. Allison previously played for the Puerto Rico Islanders in the USSF Division 2 Professional League in 2010 before signing with IFK Sundsvall in 2011.

== Career ==
=== Youth and college ===
Allison grew up in Philadelphia, Pennsylvania, attended Overbrook High School, and played club soccer for Junior Lone Star FC, before playing college soccer at Wilmington University. While at Wilmington University, he was the CACC Rookie of the Year, and received All CACC 1st Team and NSCAA All Region 2nd Team honors three consecutive years (2006 to 2008). Following his senior year, Allison was also honored as CACC Player of the Year and East Regional Player of the Year and was a 1st Team All CACC, NSCAA All-Region First Team, Daktronics 1st Team All Region and 1st Team All American selection. He finished his college career with 56 goals and 26 assists in 72 games for the Wildcats.

=== Professional ===
Undrafted out of college, Allison turned professional in 2010 when he signed with the Puerto Rico Islanders of the USSF D2 Pro League. He made his professional debut on April 16, 2010, in a 2010 CFU Club Championship game against Haitian side Racing des Gonaïves. After two successful goal scoring seasons in the Swedish fifth and fourth tier during 2011 and 2012 Allison signed with third tier club Umeå FC in March 2013.

== Personal ==
Allison's birth name was Sargbah Tarpeh; he changed it to its current form in 2009. Anthony also has 4 children. He is married to his wife Siatta. Liberian international footballer Dulee Johnson is his uncle.

== Honors ==
Puerto Rico Islanders

- USSF Division 2 Pro League: 2010
- CFU Club Championship: 2010

Individual

- "Sigma Beta Delta" National Honors Society in Business Management and Administration: 2018
