= Academica SC =

- Full name: Academica Soccer Club
- Nickname: AC
- Founded: 1972; 54 years ago
- Stadium: Academica Field
- Capacity: 600
- President: Simon Bettencourt
- Manager: Roberto Rosas
- League: USL League Two
- 2025: 6th of Nor Cal Division
- Website: academicasc.com
Home colors

Academica Soccer Club is an amateur soccer club based in Turlock, California. The team currently competes in USL League Two. The club's home stadium is Academica Soccer Field with a capacity of over 600 seated fans.

== History ==
The club was founded in 1972 by members of the Portuguese Cultural Center in Turlock, CA. Academica, or 'AC', began by joining the Central California Soccer League, winning multiple titles in the 1980s, and 1990s, and early 2000s. AC also competed in the California State Cup and Amateur Cup as well as yearly Portuguese cultural tournaments. In 2013, the club joined the LIGA NorCal, then called the NorCal Premier Adult Premier League. Academica reached the final in its first season, losing to San Francisco City FC. The team would reach the final again in 2016 and again in 2017, finally winning the championship.

On November 14, 2017, it was announced that Academica Soccer Club would join the National Premier Soccer League beginning in the 2018 season.

In May 2018, it was announced that Academica SC became affiliated with Turlock Youth Soccer Association which rebranded as Turlock Academica Jrs.

Academica qualified for the 2019 edition of the US Open Cup through the Open Division Local Qualifying track. Academica hosted league rivals El Farolito Soccer Club in the first round where they fell 2–1 to their San Francisco rivals.

The 2020 NPSL season was cancelled after only two matches due to the COVID-19 pandemic.

In 2021, the squad finished the regular season in 2nd place with a 4-1-2 record in the NPSL Return to Play series. AC would continue onto host the conference final, defeating El Farolito 2–0 in front of 600 fans in a match dubbed as the "Festa Final".

The 2022 season saw AC finish the regular season in 5th place, good enough to qualify for the conference tournament. After defeating Contra Costa FC in the first round, the Black and Gold fell to regular season champions Sacramento Gold by a score of 3–2 to finish their season.

On December 1, 2022, Academica SC joined USL League Two for the 2023 season. A women's team was also established that will play in the USL W League.

== Year-by-year ==
Men's Team
Year	League	Division	Reg. season	Playoffs
2015	LIGA NorCal	Fall Season	2nd	N/A
2016	LIGA NorCal	Fall Season	2nd	N/A
2017	LIGA NorCal	Fall Season	1st	N/A
2018	NPSL	Golden Gate	5th	DNQ
2019	NPSL	Golden Gate	3rd	Regional Semi-finals
2020	NPSL	Golden Gate	N/A	Cancelled due to COVID-19
2021	NPSL	Golden Gate	2nd	Conference Champion
2022	NPSL	Golden Gate	5th	Conference Semi-finals
2023	USL2	NorCal	6th	N/A
2024	USL2	NorCal	6th	N/A
2025	USL2	NorCal	6th	N/A
2026	USL2	NorCal	5th	N/A

Women's Team
Year	League	Division	Reg. season	Playoffs
2022	WPSL	NorCal	5th	N/A
2023	USLW	NorCal	7th	N/A
2024	USLW	NorCal	6th	N/A
2025	USLW	NorCal	9th	N/A
