= 2023 National Premier Soccer League season =

National Premier Soccer League
- Season: 2023
- Dates: March 25 – July 9 (regular season); July 1 – August 5 (playoffs)
- Champions: Tulsa Athletic (1st Title)
- Regular season title: Duluth FC (1st Title)
- Matches: 495
- Goals: 1,798 (3.63 per match)
- Best player: (Wales) Dennis Bates (Appalachian FC)
- Top goalscorer: 16 Goals (Japan) Yu Tsukanome (Dakota Fusion FC)
- Best goalkeeper: (United States) Griffin Hemmindinger (Annapolis Blues FC)
- Biggest home win: Michigan 10–0 Columbus (June 9)
- Biggest away win: Seattle 0–13 CF Red (July 8)
- Highest scoring: (13 goals); Seattle 0–13 CF Red (July 8)
- Longest winning run: 10 matches Duluth (May 13 – June 24)
- Longest unbeaten run: 12 matches Duluth (May 13 – July 8); Steel City (May 13 – July 7)
- Longest winless run: 10 matches Florida Roots (May 6 – July 1); Syracuse (May 14 – July 8); Torch (May 21 – July 8)
- Longest losing run: 10 matches Florida Roots (May 6 – July 1)
- All statistics correct as of July 9, 2023.

The 2023 National Premier Soccer League season is the 21st season of the National Premier Soccer League and part of the 111th season of FIFA-sanctioned soccer in the United States. It is also the league's 20th anniversary of its founding in 2003.

The regular season began on March 25 and concluded on July 9. A total of 94 teams participated in this season.

== Format changes ==
For the 2023 season, the Pacific Conference was redivided into the Northwest and Southwest Conferences. The Heartland Conference moved from the South Region to the Midwest and was joined by the newly created Gateway Conference. The Southeast Conference returned to the South Region after being moved to the East in 2020. Finally, the Keystone Conference was divided into East and West within the East Region.

== Teams ==
Note: Teams that are italicized previously played in the NPSL and are returning from hiatus.

=== Incoming teams ===
- 865 Alliance
- Annapolis Blues FC
- California Odyssey SC
- Charlottetowne Hops FC
- Crossfire White
- Des Moines United FC
- Ehtar Belleville FC
- Global Soccer Pathways
- Greenville United FC
- Iowa Raptors FC
- Kansas City Sol
- Michigan Rangers FC
- Philadelphia Union Development Squad
- San Ramon FC
- Virginia Dream FC
- West Texas FC

=== Name changes ===
- SC Brave Lions to Lions United FC
- FC Brownsville to Brownsville NPSL
- Coyotes FC to Central Texas Coyotes FC
- Crossfire Redmond to Crossfire Red
- Grove Soccer United to Grove United
- Irving FC to Gallos FC
- Miami Beach CF to Atletico De Miami Beach
- Midland-Odessa Sockers FC to West Texas FC
- Pittsburgh Hotspurs to Steel City FC

=== Departing teams ===
- Academica SC
  (joined USL League Two)
- FC Buffalo
  (joined USL League Two)
- Minneapolis City SC
  (focused on USL2 and UPSL teams)
- North Alabama SC
  (joined USL League Two)
- Panathinaikos Chicago
  (joined United Premier Soccer League)
- Philadelphia Lone Star FC
  (focused on USL2 and UPSL teams)

=== Teams on hiatus or folded ===
- Cedar Stars FC
- Central Florida Panthers SC
- Contra Costa FC
- AFC Mobile
- LSA Athletico Lanier
- Miami United FC
- Magia FC
- Muskegon Risers
1. ^{A} Defending 2022 national runner-up Crossfire Redmond was split into two teams for the 2023 season, Crossfire Red and Crossfire White. The determination on which team is "new" vs "renamed" is subjective. However Crossfire's 2022 head coach Bill Colello is coaching Red in 2023 and 2022 assistant coach Rory King is also on Red's roster. Therefore on this page Crossfire Red will be considered the renamed Crossfire Redmond while Crossfire White is listed as a new team.
2. ^{B} No information exists about Global Soccer Pathways joining the NPSL for the 2023 season. Additionally the coaching staff listed on the league's website is identical to Naples United FC's staff for this season and the team page's url has Naples United in it. However, this is not a "rebrand" since Naples United FC is also competing in the Sunshine Conference alongside GSP. Until proven otherwise this team will be considered a "new team".

=== 2023 Teams ===
West Region
Division	Team
Golden Gate Conference	El Farolito
Golden Gate Conference	FC Davis
Golden Gate Conference	Napa Valley 1839 FC
Golden Gate Conference	Oakland SC
Golden Gate Conference	Oakland Stompers
Golden Gate Conference	Sacramento Gold FC
Golden Gate Conference	San Ramon FC
Golden Gate Conference	Sonoma County Sol
Northwest Conference	Crossfire Red
Northwest Conference	Crossfire White
Northwest Conference	International Portland Select FC
Northwest Conference	OSA Seattle FC
Southwest Conference	California Odyssey SC
Southwest Conference	FC Arizona
Southwest Conference	Las Vegas Legends FC
Southwest Conference	Lions United FC

South Region
Division	Team
Gulf Coast Conference	Florida Roots Futbol Club
Gulf Coast Conference	Jacksonville Armada U-23
Gulf Coast Conference	New Orleans Jesters
Gulf Coast Conference	Pensacola FC
Gulf Coast Conference	Southern States SC
Gulf Coast Conference	Tallahassee SC
Lone Star Conference	Austin United FC
Lone Star Conference	Brownsville NPSL
Lone Star Conference	Central Texas Coyotes FC
Lone Star Conference	CF10 Houston FC
Lone Star Conference	Corinthians FC of San Antonio
Lone Star Conference	Denton Diablos FC
Lone Star Conference	Fort Worth Vaqueros FC
Lone Star Conference	~~Gallos FC~~
Lone Star Conference	Laredo Heat SC
Lone Star Conference	Lubbock Matadors SC
Lone Star Conference	West Texas FC
Southeast Conference	865 Alliance
Southeast Conference	Apotheos FC
Southeast Conference	Appalachian FC
Southeast Conference	Charlottetowne Hops FC
Southeast Conference	Georgia Revolution FC
Southeast Conference	Georgia Storm
Sunshine Conference	Atletico De Miami Beach
Sunshine Conference	Global Soccer Pathways
Sunshine Conference	Miami Dutch Lions FC
Sunshine Conference	Naples United FC

Midwest Region
Division	Team
Gateway Conference	Club Atletico Saint Louis
Gateway Conference	Des Moines United FC
Gateway Conference	Ehtar Belleville FC
Gateway Conference	FC Milwaukee Torrent
Gateway Conference	Iowa Raptors FC
Gateway Conference	Sunflower State FC
Great Lakes Conference	Akron City FC
Great Lakes Conference	Carpathia FC
Great Lakes Conference	Cleveland SC
Great Lakes Conference	Erie Commodores FC
Great Lakes Conference	FC Columbus
Great Lakes Conference	Michigan Rangers FC
Great Lakes Conference	Steel City FC
Heartland Conference	Arkansas Wolves FC
Heartland Conference	Demize NPSL
Heartland Conference	Kansas City Sol
Heartland Conference	OKC 1889 FC
Heartland Conference	Reign FK
Heartland Conference	Tulsa Athletic
North Conference	Dakota Fusion FC
North Conference	Duluth FC
North Conference	Joy St. Louis Park
North Conference	LaCrosse Aris FC
North Conference	Med City FC
North Conference	Minnesota Twin Stars
North Conference	Sioux Falls Thunder FC

East Region
Division	Team
Keystone East Conference	Atlantic City FC
Keystone East Conference	FC Monmouth
Keystone East Conference	FC Motown
Keystone East Conference	First State FC
Keystone East Conference	Jackson Lions FC
Keystone East Conference	Philadelphia Union Development Squad
Keystone West Conference	Electric City Shock SC
Keystone West Conference	Hershey FC
Keystone West Conference	Pennsylvania Classics AC
Keystone West Conference	Philadelphia Ukrainians Nationals
Keystone West Conference	Torch FC
Keystone West Conference	West Chester United SC
Mid-Atlantic Conference	Alexandria Reds
Mid-Atlantic Conference	Annapolis Blues FC
Mid-Atlantic Conference	FC Frederick
Mid-Atlantic Conference	Greenville United FC
Mid-Atlantic Conference	Grove United
Mid-Atlantic Conference	Northern Virginia United FC
Mid-Atlantic Conference	Virginia Beach City FC
Mid-Atlantic Conference	Virginia Dream FC
North Atlantic Conference	Hartford City FC
North Atlantic Conference	Kingston Stockade FC
North Atlantic Conference	New York Shockers
North Atlantic Conference	Syracuse FC
North Atlantic Conference	Valeo FC

== Standings and results ==
=== West Region ===
==== Golden Gate Conference ====
Pos	Team	Pld	W	L	T	GF	GA	GD	Pts	Qualification
1	El Farolito	10	9	0	1	29	6	+23	28	Golden Gate Conference playoffs
2	Napa Valley 1839 FC	10	7	2	1	28	18	+10	22	Golden Gate Conference playoffs
3	San Ramon FC	10	4	2	4	19	14	+5	16	Golden Gate Conference playoffs
4	Oakland SC	10	3	5	2	19	19	0	11	Golden Gate Conference playoffs
5	Sacramento Gold	10	3	6	1	13	21	−8	10	Golden Gate Conference playoffs
6	Sonoma County Sol	10	2	6	2	13	23	−10	8	Golden Gate Conference playoffs
7	FC Davis	10	1	6	3	14	26	−12	6	Golden Gate Conference playoffs
8	Oakland Stompers	10	1	7	2	12	39	−27	5	Golden Gate Conference playoffs

Source: NPSL
Rules for classification: 1) points; 2) head-to-head; 3) goal differential in head-to-head results; 4) wins; 5) total goal differential; 6) fewest losses; 7) coin toss. If three or more teams are tied on points, a mini-table involving only the tied teams is used, and teams are ranked in the mini-table on points. If two teams are tied on points in the mini-table, the two-team rules for classification apply. If three or more teams are tied on points in the mini-table, they are ranked based on 1) wins in conference competition; 2) total goal differential in conference competition; 3) fewest losses in conference competition; 4) coin toss.

==== Northwest Conference ====
Pos	Team	Pld	W	L	T	GF	GA	GD	Pts	Qualification
1	Crossfire Red (C)	10	7	2	1	39	17	+22	22	West Region Semifinals
2	International Portland Select FC (Note: The Northwest Conference champion was determined by regular season PPG. International Portland Select led the conference with 2.33 PPG but was not eligible for the playoffs due to not playing enough regular season matches.)	6	4	0	2	15	7	+8	14	
3	Crossfire White	10	4	5	1	30	25	+5	13	
4	OSA Seattle FC	10	1	9	0	16	51	−35	3	

Source: NPSL
Rules for classification: 1) points; 2) head-to-head; 3) goal differential in head-to-head results; 4) wins; 5) total goal differential; 6) fewest losses; 7) coin toss. If three or more teams are tied on points, a mini-table involving only the tied teams is used, and teams are ranked in the mini-table on points. If two teams are tied on points in the mini-table, the two-team rules for classification apply. If three or more teams are tied on points in the mini-table, they are ranked based on 1) wins in conference competition; 2) total goal differential in conference competition; 3) fewest losses in conference competition; 4) coin toss.
(C) Champions

==== Southwest Conference ====
Pos	Team	Pld	W	L	T	GF	GA	GD	Pts	Qualification
1	FC Arizona	10	5	3	2	19	12	+7	17 (Note: FC Arizona and California Odyssey SC win the tiebreaker over Las Vegas Legends FC on Wins in Conference Competition. Excluding the four regular season games played against teams from the Golden Gate Conference, Arizona and Odyssey both finished with records of 3-1-2 (WDL) against Southwest Conference teams. Las Vegas finished with a record of 1-2-3 (WDL). FC Arizona wins the tiebreaker over California Odyssey on Total Goal Differential.)	Southwest Conference playoffs
2	California Odyssey SC	10	5	3	2	18	13	+5	17	Southwest Conference playoffs
3	Las Vegas Legends FC	10	5	3	2	24	13	+11	17	
4	Lions United FC	10	3	4	3	19	23	−4	12	

Source: NPSL
Rules for classification: 1) points; 2) head-to-head; 3) goal differential in head-to-head results; 4) wins; 5) total goal differential; 6) fewest losses; 7) coin toss. If three or more teams are tied on points, a mini-table involving only the tied teams is used, and teams are ranked in the mini-table on points. If two teams are tied on points in the mini-table, the two-team rules for classification apply. If three or more teams are tied on points in the mini-table, they are ranked based on 1) wins in conference competition; 2) total goal differential in conference competition; 3) fewest losses in conference competition; 4) coin toss.

=== Midwest Region ===
==== Gateway Conference ====
Pos	Team	Pld	W	L	T	GF	GA	GD	Pts	Qualification
1	Des Moines United FC	10	8	1	1	21	8	+13	25	Gateway Conference playoffs
2	FC Milwaukee Torrent	10	5	2	3	20	11	+9	18	Gateway Conference playoffs
3	Sunflower State FC	10	4	5	1	21	22	−1	13	
4	Iowa Raptors FC	10	4	6	0	23	28	−5	12	
5	Ehtar Belleville FC	10	3	5	2	17	23	−6	11	
6	Club Atletico Saint Louis	10	2	7	1	15	25	−10	7	

Source: NPSL
Rules for classification: 1) points; 2) head-to-head; 3) goal differential in head-to-head results; 4) wins; 5) total goal differential; 6) fewest losses; 7) coin toss. If three or more teams are tied on points, a mini-table involving only the tied teams is used, and teams are ranked in the mini-table on points. If two teams are tied on points in the mini-table, the two-team rules for classification apply. If three or more teams are tied on points in the mini-table, they are ranked based on 1) wins in conference competition; 2) total goal differential in conference competition; 3) fewest losses in conference competition; 4) coin toss.

==== Great Lakes Conference ====
Pos	Team	Pld	W	L	T	GF	GA	GD	Pts	Qualification
1	Steel City FC	12	10	0	2	32	12	+20	32	Great Lakes Conference Final
2	Michigan Rangers FC	12	8	3	1	30	12	+18	25	Great Lakes Conference Semifinal
3	Cleveland SC	12	6	4	2	22	15	+7	20	Great Lakes Conference Semifinal
4	Carpathia FC	12	5	6	1	21	20	+1	16 (Note: Carpathia FC wins the tiebreaker over Erie Commodores on Goal Differential in Head-to-Head Results (6:5).)	
5	Erie Commodores	12	5	6	1	17	22	−5	16	
6	Akron City FC	12	3	8	1	15	20	−5	10	
7	FC Columbus	12	1	11	0	6	42	−36	3	

Source: NPSL
Rules for classification: 1) points; 2) head-to-head; 3) goal differential in head-to-head results; 4) wins; 5) total goal differential; 6) fewest losses; 7) coin toss. If three or more teams are tied on points, a mini-table involving only the tied teams is used, and teams are ranked in the mini-table on points. If two teams are tied on points in the mini-table, the two-team rules for classification apply. If three or more teams are tied on points in the mini-table, they are ranked based on 1) wins in conference competition; 2) total goal differential in conference competition; 3) fewest losses in conference competition; 4) coin toss.

==== Heartland Conference ====
Pos	Team	Pld	W	L	T	GF	GA	GD	Pts	Qualification
1	Tulsa Athletic	10	7	1	2	23	8	+15	23	Heartland Conference playoffs
2	OKC 1889 FC	10	7	2	1	17	8	+9	22	Heartland Conference playoffs
3	Kansas City Sol	10	3	4	3	24	20	+4	12 (Note: Kansas City Sol wins the tiebreaker over Demize NPSL on Total Goal Differential.)	Heartland Conference playoffs
4	Demize NPSL	10	3	4	3	16	19	−3	12	Heartland Conference playoffs
5	Reign FK	10	2	6	2	13	23	−10	8	
6	Arkansas Wolves FC	10	2	7	1	14	29	−15	7	

Source: NPSL
Rules for classification: 1) points; 2) head-to-head; 3) goal differential in head-to-head results; 4) wins; 5) total goal differential; 6) fewest losses; 7) coin toss. If three or more teams are tied on points, a mini-table involving only the tied teams is used, and teams are ranked in the mini-table on points. If two teams are tied on points in the mini-table, the two-team rules for classification apply. If three or more teams are tied on points in the mini-table, they are ranked based on 1) wins in conference competition; 2) total goal differential in conference competition; 3) fewest losses in conference competition; 4) coin toss.

==== North Conference ====
Pos	Team	Pld	W	L	T	GF	GA	GD	Pts	Qualification
1	Duluth FC	12	11	0	1	39	6	+33	34	North Conference playoffs
2	Dakota Fusion FC	12	8	3	1	37	22	+15	25	North Conference playoffs
3	Med City FC	12	6	2	4	23	10	+13	22	North Conference playoffs
4	Minnesota TwinStars FC	12	4	6	2	25	33	−8	14	North Conference playoffs
5	Joy St. Louis Park	12	4	8	0	20	40	−20	12	
6	La Crosse Aris FC	12	2	9	1	12	37	−25	7	
7	Sioux Falls Thunder FC	12	1	8	3	19	27	−8	6	

Source: NPSL
Rules for classification: 1) points; 2) head-to-head; 3) goal differential in head-to-head results; 4) wins; 5) total goal differential; 6) fewest losses; 7) coin toss. If three or more teams are tied on points, a mini-table involving only the tied teams is used, and teams are ranked in the mini-table on points. If two teams are tied on points in the mini-table, the two-team rules for classification apply. If three or more teams are tied on points in the mini-table, they are ranked based on 1) wins in conference competition; 2) total goal differential in conference competition; 3) fewest losses in conference competition; 4) coin toss.

=== South Region ===
==== Gulf Coast Conference ====
Pos	Team	Pld	W	L	T	GF	GA	GD	Pts	Qualification
1	Southern States SC	10	7	1	2	30	9	+21	23	Gulf Coast Conference playoffs
2	Jacksonville Armada FC U-23	10	6	2	2	24	14	+10	20	Gulf Coast Conference playoffs
3	Pensacola FC	10	4	4	2	15	19	−4	14 (Note: Pensacola FC wins the tiebreaker over Tallahassee SC on Head-to-Head results.)	Gulf Coast Conference playoffs
4	Tallahassee SC	10	3	2	5	14	14	0	14	Gulf Coast Conference playoffs
5	New Orleans Jesters	10	3	4	3	11	19	−8	12	
6	Florida Roots FC	10	0	10	0	12	31	−19	0	

Source: NPSL
Rules for classification: 1) points; 2) head-to-head; 3) goal differential in head-to-head results; 4) wins; 5) total goal differential; 6) fewest losses; 7) coin toss. If three or more teams are tied on points, a mini-table involving only the tied teams is used, and teams are ranked in the mini-table on points. If two teams are tied on points in the mini-table, the two-team rules for classification apply. If three or more teams are tied on points in the mini-table, they are ranked based on 1) wins in conference competition; 2) total goal differential in conference competition; 3) fewest losses in conference competition; 4) coin toss.

==== Lone Star Conference ====
Pos	Team	Pld	W	L	T	GF	GA	GD	Pts	Qualification
1	Lubbock Matadors SC	11	10	1	0	36	8	+28	30	Lone Star Conference playoffs
2	Brownsville NPSL	11	8	2	1	36	9	+27	25	Lone Star Conference playoffs
3	West Texas FC	11	7	3	1	22	14	+8	22	Lone Star Conference playoffs
4	Corinthians FC of San Antonio	11	6	3	2	19	19	0	20	Lone Star Conference playoffs
5	Laredo Heat SC	11	6	4	1	31	14	+17	19	
6	Denton Diablos FC	11	4	4	3	17	24	−7	15	
7	Fort Worth Vaqueros FC	11	4	7	0	17	30	−13	12	
8	Austin United FC	11	2	7	2	13	23	−10	8	
9	CF10 Houston FC	11	1	9	1	14	40	−26	4 (Note: CF10 Houston FC wins the tiebreaker over Central Texas Coyotes FC on Head-to-Head results.)	
10	Central Texas Coyotes FC	11	1	9	1	13	37	−24	4	
11	Gallos FC (Note: Gallos FC announced it was ceasing operations mid-season on Saturday, June 24. The team had five games remaining in the regular season and had a record of 2-3-2 (WDL) with nine points (10 goals scored, 12 allowed) at the time of departure. All of the team's games were retroactively removed from the conference standings.)	0	0	0	0	0	0	0	0	Withdrew from the league

Source: NPSL
Rules for classification: 1) points; 2) head-to-head; 3) goal differential in head-to-head results; 4) wins; 5) total goal differential; 6) fewest losses; 7) coin toss. If three or more teams are tied on points, a mini-table involving only the tied teams is used, and teams are ranked in the mini-table on points. If two teams are tied on points in the mini-table, the two-team rules for classification apply. If three or more teams are tied on points in the mini-table, they are ranked based on 1) wins in conference competition; 2) total goal differential in conference competition; 3) fewest losses in conference competition; 4) coin toss.

==== Southeast Conference ====
Pos	Team	Pld	W	L	T	GF	GA	GD	Pts	Qualification
1	Apotheos FC	10	6	1	3	21	11	+10	21	Southeast Conference playoffs
2	Appalachian FC	10	5	3	2	21	16	+5	17	Southeast Conference playoffs
3	Georgia Revolution FC	10	5	5	0	19	19	0	15	Southeast Conference playoffs
4	Charlottetowne Hops FC	10	4	4	2	18	18	0	14	Southeast Conference playoffs
5	865 Alliance	10	2	5	3	10	15	−5	9	
6	Georgia Storm	10	2	6	2	10	20	−10	8	

Source: NPSL
Rules for classification: 1) points; 2) head-to-head; 3) goal differential in head-to-head results; 4) wins; 5) total goal differential; 6) fewest losses; 7) coin toss. If three or more teams are tied on points, a mini-table involving only the tied teams is used, and teams are ranked in the mini-table on points. If two teams are tied on points in the mini-table, the two-team rules for classification apply. If three or more teams are tied on points in the mini-table, they are ranked based on 1) wins in conference competition; 2) total goal differential in conference competition; 3) fewest losses in conference competition; 4) coin toss.

==== Sunshine Conference ====
Pos	Team	Pld	W	L	T	GF	GA	GD	Pts	Qualification
1	Naples United FC (C)	10	9	1	0	37	15	+22	27	South Region Semifinals
2	Atlético de Miami Beach	10	4	4	2	18	23	−5	14	
3	Global Soccer Pathways	10	3	6	1	22	22	0	10	
4	Miami Dutch Lions FC	10	2	7	1	11	28	−17	7	

Source: NPSL
Rules for classification: 1) points; 2) head-to-head; 3) goal differential in head-to-head results; 4) wins; 5) total goal differential; 6) fewest losses; 7) coin toss. If three or more teams are tied on points, a mini-table involving only the tied teams is used, and teams are ranked in the mini-table on points. If two teams are tied on points in the mini-table, the two-team rules for classification apply. If three or more teams are tied on points in the mini-table, they are ranked based on 1) wins in conference competition; 2) total goal differential in conference competition; 3) fewest losses in conference competition; 4) coin toss.
(C) Champions

=== East Region ===
==== Keystone East Conference ====
Pos	Team	Pld	W	L	T	GF	GA	GD	Pts	Qualification
1	FC Motown	10	8	0	2	34	8	+26	26	Keystone East Conference playoffs
2	Atlantic City FC	10	5	1	4	21	11	+10	19 (Note: Atlantic City FC wins the tiebreaker over Jackson Lions FC on Head-to-Head results.)	Keystone East Conference playoffs
3	Jackson Lions FC	10	6	3	1	22	15	+7	19	
4	FC Monmouth	10	3	6	1	13	19	−6	10	
5	Philadelphia Union Development Squad	10	3	7	0	17	32	−15	9	
6	First State FC	10	1	9	0	15	37	−22	3	

Source: NPSL
Rules for classification: 1) points; 2) head-to-head; 3) goal differential in head-to-head results; 4) wins; 5) total goal differential; 6) fewest losses; 7) coin toss. If three or more teams are tied on points, a mini-table involving only the tied teams is used, and teams are ranked in the mini-table on points. If two teams are tied on points in the mini-table, the two-team rules for classification apply. If three or more teams are tied on points in the mini-table, they are ranked based on 1) wins in conference competition; 2) total goal differential in conference competition; 3) fewest losses in conference competition; 4) coin toss.

==== Keystone West Conference ====
Pos	Team	Pld	W	L	T	GF	GA	GD	Pts	Qualification
1	West Chester United SC	10	7	0	3	21	7	+14	24	Keystone West Conference playoffs
2	Hershey FC	10	5	2	3	17	14	+3	18	Keystone West Conference playoffs
3	Philadelphia Ukrainians Nationals SC	10	5	4	1	17	11	+6	16	
4	Electric City Shock SC	10	3	5	2	16	14	+2	11	
5	Pennsylvania Classics AC	10	2	4	4	9	11	−2	10	
6	Torch FC	10	0	7	3	4	27	−23	3	

Source: NPSL
Rules for classification: 1) points; 2) head-to-head; 3) goal differential in head-to-head results; 4) wins; 5) total goal differential; 6) fewest losses; 7) coin toss. If three or more teams are tied on points, a mini-table involving only the tied teams is used, and teams are ranked in the mini-table on points. If two teams are tied on points in the mini-table, the two-team rules for classification apply. If three or more teams are tied on points in the mini-table, they are ranked based on 1) wins in conference competition; 2) total goal differential in conference competition; 3) fewest losses in conference competition; 4) coin toss.

==== Mid-Atlantic Conference ====
Pos	Team	Pld	W	L	T	GF	GA	GD	Pts	Qualification
1	Annapolis Blues FC	10	8	1	1	32	8	+24	25	Mid-Atlantic Conference playoffs
2	Greenville United FC	10	6	0	4	20	7	+13	22	Mid-Atlantic Conference playoffs
3	Alexandria Reds	10	6	2	2	23	12	+11	20	Mid-Atlantic Conference playoffs
4	Grove United	10	3	4	3	15	20	−5	12	Mid-Atlantic Conference playoffs
5	Northern Virginia United FC	10	3	5	2	17	18	−1	11	
6	Virginia Dream FC	10	2	4	4	13	20	−7	10	
7	Virginia Beach City FC	10	1	6	3	8	27	−19	6	
8	FC Frederick	10	1	8	1	11	27	−16	4	

Source: NPSL
Rules for classification: 1) points; 2) head-to-head; 3) goal differential in head-to-head results; 4) wins; 5) total goal differential; 6) fewest losses; 7) coin toss. If three or more teams are tied on points, a mini-table involving only the tied teams is used, and teams are ranked in the mini-table on points. If two teams are tied on points in the mini-table, the two-team rules for classification apply. If three or more teams are tied on points in the mini-table, they are ranked based on 1) wins in conference competition; 2) total goal differential in conference competition; 3) fewest losses in conference competition; 4) coin toss.

==== North Atlantic Conference ====
Pos	Team	Pld	W	L	T	GF	GA	GD	Pts	Qualification
1	Kingston Stockade FC	10	7	1	2	24	10	+14	23	North Atlantic Conference Final
2	Hartford City FC	10	5	3	2	19	10	+9	17	North Atlantic Conference Semifinal
3	New York Shockers	10	3	3	4	11	13	−2	13	North Atlantic Conference Semifinal
4	Valeo FC	10	3	6	1	11	22	−11	10	
5	Syracuse FC	10	0	5	5	8	18	−10	5	

Source: NPSL
Rules for classification: 1) points; 2) head-to-head; 3) goal differential in head-to-head results; 4) wins; 5) total goal differential; 6) fewest losses; 7) coin toss. If three or more teams are tied on points, a mini-table involving only the tied teams is used, and teams are ranked in the mini-table on points. If two teams are tied on points in the mini-table, the two-team rules for classification apply. If three or more teams are tied on points in the mini-table, they are ranked based on 1) wins in conference competition; 2) total goal differential in conference competition; 3) fewest losses in conference competition; 4) coin toss.

== Playoffs ==
Note: Games are hosted by the highest seed unless noted otherwise

=== West Region Conference playoffs ===
==== Golden Gate Conference playoffs ====
Note: The Golden Gate Conference playoff matches were determined by random draw. The teams that finished in the top four of the regular season (El Farolito, Napa Valley 1839 FC, San Ramon FC, Oakland SC) were placed in Pot A, teams that finished in the bottom four (Sacramento Gold FC, Sonoma County Sol, FC Davis, Oakland Stompers) were placed in Pot B. Pot A teams were drawn against Pot B teams, with the former hosting the conference quarterfinals. The winners of Game 1 and 3 (shown below in order from top to bottom) will host the semifinal matches.

The conference semifinal winners will advance to the West Region Semifinal round, which will double as the conference championship final. The remaining teams will be seeded #1 & #2 based on regular season PPG.

Quarterfinals; July 1–2
San Ramon FC	0
**FC Davis**	**2**
**El Farolito**	**3**
Sonoma County Sol	1
Oakland SC	1
**Oakland Stompers**	**2**
**Napa Valley 1839 FC**	**3**
Sacramento Gold FC	1

Semifinal; July 8
FC Davis	2
**El Farolito**	**4**
Oakland Stompers	0
**Napa Valley 1839 FC**	**3**

Final; July 15
1	**El Farolito**	**1***
2	Napa Valley 1839 FC	0

Bold = winner
* = after extra time, ( ) = penalty shootout score, FF = forfeit

July 1, 2023 Conference Quarterfinals	**El Farolito**	**3–1**	**Sonoma County Sol**	San Francisco, California
11:30 AM PDT	Benson 35'; Quintero 50'; Pérez 58'; Martinez (yellow card) 78'	Report	Pecanha (yellow card) 49'; Valenzuela 55'; English (yellow card) 64'; Cruz (yellow card) 89'	Stadium: Boxer Stadium

July 1, 2023 Conference Quarterfinals	**Napa Valley 1839 FC**	**3–1**	**Sacramento Gold FC**	Napa, California
7:00 PM PDT	Pavon 49'; Sakou 57', 69'; Gomez-Avila (yellow card) 88'	Report	Mazzoni (yellow card) 53'; Okugo 74'; Christian (yellow card) 88'; B. Herrera (yellow card) 88'; A. Herrera (red card) 88'; Alsakati (yellow card) 90+3'	Stadium: Dodd Stadium
Note: Match report incorrectly states Amobi Okugo's goal for Sacramento came in the 15th minute. Stream of the match shows that to be incorrect, with his goal coming after Napa's three goals in the second half.

July 1, 2023 Conference Quarterfinals	**Oakland SC**	**1–2**	**Oakland Stompers**	Oakland, California
7:00 PM PDT	Cervantes 9'; Lepore (yellow card) 25'; Kasahara (yellow card) 30'; Alvarez (yellow card) 52'	Report	Bere 25'; Andrews 32'; Hakim (yellow card) 42'; Canchola (yellow card) 48'; Martínez (yellow card) 61'	Stadium: Oakland Technical High School

July 2, 2023 Conference Quarterfinals	**San Ramon FC**	**0–2**	**FC Davis**	San Ramon, California
7:00 PM PDT	Carbajal (yellow card) 45'; Cuellar (yellow card) 68'; Alvarado (yellow card) 90+1'	Report	Adeyeye (yellow card) 6'; Farnan 25'; Fernandez-Kim (yellow card) 62'; Aladetimi (yellow card) 77'; Salari-Namin 88'; Streicker-Hirt (yellow card) 90+2'	Stadium: Tiffany Roberts Soccer Field

July 8, 2023 Conference Semifinals	**Napa Valley 1839 FC**	**3–0**	**Oakland Stompers**	Napa, California
7:00 PM PDT	Moreno 9'; Cascon 27'; Gomez-Avila (yellow card) 43'; Kane 51'; Rocha (yellow card) 78'		Rocha (yellow card) 64'; Mahic (yellow card) 90+1'	Stadium: Dodd Stadium
Note: Oakland Stompers were the original designated host for this match according to the NPSL Golden Gate Conference playoff guidelines. However prior to the match Napa Valley was confirmed as the home side.

July 8, 2023 Conference Semifinals	**FC Davis**	**2–4**	**El Farolito**	Davis, California
7:00 PM PDT	Aladetimi 21' (pen.) (red card) 28'; Herrera (yellow card) 24'; Adeyeye (yellow card) 40'; Olsen-Zwick 73' (yellow card) 73'; Streicker-Hirt (yellow card) 81'; Fuentes (red card) 90+6'	Report	Benson 28', 83', 89' (yellow card) 33'; Aguilar (red card) 29'; Becerra (yellow card) 57'; Arias (yellow card) 65'; Martinez (yellow card) 71'; Martinez (yellow card) 88'; Da Silva (red card) 90'; Delgado 90+6' (pen.)	Stadium: Playfields Soccer Stadium

July 16, 2023 Conference Final	**El Farolito**	**1–0** (a.e.t.)	Napa Valley 1839 FC	San Francisco, California
7:00 PM PDT	Delgado (yellow card) 17'; Arias (yellow card) 51'; Perez (yellow card) 79'; Buitrago 96'	Report	Pavon (yellow card) 66'; Martins (yellow card) 81'; Sakou (yellow card) 95'; Ayala (yellow card) 105'; Paniagua (yellow card) 112'	Stadium: Boxer Stadium
Note: This match also served as the NPSL West Region Semifinal

==== Southwest Conference playoffs ====
Final; July 8
1	**FC Arizona**	**FF**
2	California Odyssey SC

Bold = winner
* = after extra time, ( ) = penalty shootout score, FF = forfeit

July 8, 2023 Conference Final	**FC Arizona**	**3–0** **(forfeit)**	California Odyssey SC	Gilbert, Arizona
7:00 PM MDT		Report		Stadium: Campo Verde High School

=== Midwest Region Conference playoffs ===
==== Gateway Conference playoffs ====
Final; July 15
1	**Des Moines United FC**	**2***
2	FC Milwaukee Torrent	1

Bold = winner
* = after extra time, ( ) = penalty shootout score, FF = forfeit

July 15, 2023 Conference Final	**Des Moines United FC**	**2–1** (a.e.t.)	**FC Milwaukee Torrent**	West Des Moines, Iowa
7:00 PM EDT	Berger 65'; Chagour (yellow card) 105'; Carlson 119'	Report; Broadcast	Novak (yellow card) 11'; Crain 31'; Hrybovych (yellow card) 100'; Piscaglia (yellow card) 112'	Stadium: MidAmerican Energy Company RecPlex

==== Great Lakes Conference playoffs ====
Semifinal; July 12			Final; July 15
			1	**Steel City FC**	**2**
2	Michigan Rangers FC	0	3	Cleveland SC	0
3	**Cleveland SC**	**1**

Bold = winner
* = after extra time, ( ) = penalty shootout score, FF = forfeit

July 12, 2023 Conference Semifinal	Michigan Rangers FC	**0–1**	**Cleveland SC**	Grand Rapids, Michigan
7:00 PM EDT	Barone (yellow card) 45'; Kurz (yellow card) 59'	Report	Pellegrini 47', (yellow card) 61'	Stadium: Davenport University

July 15, 2023 Conference Final	**Steel City FC**	**2–0**	Cleveland SC	Cheswick, Pennsylvania
5:30 PM EDT	Norris 37'; Afawubo (yellow card) 52'; Plizga (yellow card) 64'; Landry 79'	Report; Broadcast	Beck (yellow card) 65'; Foht (yellow card) 85'; Alves (yellow card) 86'	Stadium: Founders Field

==== Heartland Conference playoffs ====
Semifinals; July 12
1	**Tulsa Athletic**	**2**
4	Demize NPSL	0
2	**OKC 1889 FC**	**2**
3	Kansas City Sol	1

Final; July 15
1	**Tulsa Athletic**	**2**
2	OKC 1889 FC	1

Bold = winner
* = after extra time, ( ) = penalty shootout score, FF = forfeit

July 12, 2023 Conference Semifinals	**OKC 1889 FC**	**2–1**	**Kansas City Sol**	Oklahoma City, Oklahoma
7:30 PM CDT	O'Riordan (yellow card) 43'; Alexander 60', 86' (yellow card) 86'; Johnson (yellow card) 67'; Avila (yellow card) 75'	Report	Gilyard 12' (yellow card) 68'; Rangel (yellow card) 61'	Stadium: OCU Stadium

July 12, 2023 Conference Semifinals	**Tulsa Athletic**	**2–0**	Demize NPSL	Claremore, Oklahoma
7:30 PM CDT	Gordan (yellow card) 35'; Torres (yellow card) 42'; Quashie (yellow card) 74'; Flores 77', 89'; Mello (yellow card) 90+5'	Report	Pimenta (yellow card) 30'	Stadium: Rogers State University

July 15, 2023 Conference Final	**Tulsa Athletic**	**2–1**	OKC 1889 FC	Claremore, Oklahoma
7:30 PM CDT	Chavez (yellow card) 35'; Flores 47', 74'; De Oliveira (yellow card) 77'; Torres (yellow card) 90+2'	Report; Broadcast	O'Riordan (yellow card) 14'; Alexander 50'; Nieuwhof (yellow card) 90'; Al-Sayed (yellow card) 90+1'	Stadium: Rogers State University

==== North Conference playoffs ====
Semifinals; July 12
1	**Duluth FC**	**5**
4	Minnesota TwinStars FC	1
2	Dakota Fusion FC	0
3	**Med City FC**	**2**

Final; July 15
1	Duluth FC	1
3	**Med City FC**	**2***

Bold = winner
* = after extra time, ( ) = penalty shootout score, FF = forfeit

July 12, 2023 Conference Semifinals	Dakota Fusion FC	**0–2**	**Med City FC**	Moorhead, Minnesota
7:00 PM CDT	Gasper (yellow card) 78'	Report	Hart 70'; Jumeau 74'; Milla (yellow card) 76'	Stadium: Jim Gotta Stadium

July 12, 2023 Conference Semifinals	**Duluth FC**	**5–1**	**Minnesota TwinStars FC**	Duluth, Minnesota
7:00 PM CDT	Limmer 39', 84' (pen.); Domaratskyy (yellow card) 43', (goal) 45' (pen.); Edmondson (yellow card) 56'; Solares 62', (yellow card) 69'; Santos 74'	Report	Jabateh 36', (yellow card) 53'; Brent (yellow card) 40' (yellow-red card) 51'; Abdulrahman (yellow card) 76'; Mator (yellow card) 80'	Stadium: Public Schools Stadium

July 15, 2023 Conference Final	Duluth FC	**1–2** (a.e.t.)	**Med City FC**	Duluth, Minnesota
7:00 PM CDT	O'Mahony (yellow card) 24' (yellow-red card) 120+'; Edmondson (yellow card) 34'; Viebrantz-Zavatini (yellow card) 34' (yellow-red card) 66'; Santos 45'; Solares (yellow card) 61' (yellow-red card) 88'; Akinola (yellow card) 90'; Bobai (yellow card) 93'; Domaratskyy (red card) 120+'; Foltz (yellow card) 120+'; Doyle (yellow card) 120+'	Report; Broadcast	Wilkinson (yellow card) 27'; Tolbert (yellow card) 37'; Neil (yellow card) 68'; Jumeau 76' (pen.); Roberts (yellow card) 92'; Soares (yellow card) 110'; Cassidy (red card) 110'; Schroeder 116' (yellow card) 116'	Stadium: Public Schools Stadium

=== South Region Conference playoffs ===
==== Gulf Coast Conference playoffs ====
Semifinals; July 12
1	**Southern States SC**	**3**
4	Tallahassee SC	2
2	JAX Armada U-23	0
3	**Pensacola FC**	**3**

Final; July 15
1	**Southern States SC**	**5**
3	Pensacola FC	0

Bold = winner
* = after extra time, ( ) = penalty shootout score, FF = forfeit

July 12, 2023 Conference Semifinals	Jacksonville Armada FC U-23	**0–3**	**Pensacola FC**	Jacksonville, Florida
7:00 PM EDT	Penzone (yellow card) 20'; Tunbridge (yellow card) 29'; Bowman (yellow card) 46'	Report	Hernandez (yellow card) 14'; Dos Santos 21', 64'; Clements 53'; Lightbourne (yellow card) 55'; Kamara (yellow card) 61'; Andrews (yellow card) 67'	Stadium: Nathaniel Glover Community Field

July 12, 2023 Conference Semifinals	**Southern States SC**	**3–2**	Tallahassee SC	Hattiesburg, Mississippi
7:30 PM EDT	Hoyos 5', 55', (yellow card) 45'; Torre (yellow card) 50'; Villafañe 60'; Walsh (yellow card) 66'	Report	Dowling (yellow card) 30'; Lo 42'; Fitzgerald 45'; Lescher (yellow card) 64'	Stadium: Oaks Training Center

July 15, 2023 Conference Final	**Southern States SC**	**5–0**	Pensacola FC	Hattiesburg, Mississippi
7:30 PM EDT	Walsh 34', 89'; Torre (yellow card) 41'; Kabambala (yellow card) 50'; Hoyos 62', 65'; Gardner 68'; Harrison (yellow card) 73' (yellow-red card) 83'; Jorgge (yellow card) 74'; Hernando (yellow card) 80'	Report	Lightbourne (yellow card) 39'; Kamara (yellow card) 45'; Torres (yellow card) 90'	Stadium: Oaks Training Center

==== Lone Star Conference playoffs ====
Semifinals; July 11
1	**Lubbock Matadors SC**	**6**
4	Corinthians FC of SA	0
2	**Brownsville NPSL**	**2**
3	West Texas FC	1

Final; July 15
1	Lubbock Matadors SC	0
2	**Brownsville NPSL**	**1***

Bold = winner
* = after extra time, ( ) = penalty shootout score, FF = forfeit

July 11, 2023 Conference Semifinals	**Brownsville NPSL**	**2–1**	West Texas FC	Brownsville, Texas
7:15 PM CDT	Echavarria 4', 56'; Silva Reyes (yellow card) 36'; Villarino (yellow card) 43'; Castrejon (yellow card) 83'; Ordonez Nino (yellow card) 84'; Pedroza (yellow card) 90+1'; Peña Marquez (yellow card) 90+4'	Report	Shibata 50'; Barroso (yellow card) 62' (yellow-red card) 90+6'; Murdoch (yellow card) 66'; Almeida (yellow card) 68'; Tarrés (yellow card) 75'; Natsume (yellow card) 78'; Gonzalez (yellow card) 90+6'	Stadium: Brownsville Sports Park

July 11, 2023 Conference Semifinals	**Lubbock Matadors SC**	**6–0**	Corinthians FC of San Antonio	Lubbock, Texas
7:30 PM CDT	Diez 35', 64'; Giwa-Mcneil 47'; Moreira 50'; Ahola 81'; Appiah 90+1'	Report	Williams (yellow card) 60'	Stadium: Lubbock Cooper's Pirate Stadium; Attendance: 5,422

July 15, 2023 Conference Final	Lubbock Matadors SC	**0–1** (a.e.t.)	**Brownsville NPSL**	Lubbock, Texas
7:30 PM CDT	Hirokawa (yellow card) 50'; Giwa-McNeil (yellow card) 85'; Rodrigues (yellow card) 120'	Report; Broadcast	Espinoza (yellow card) 51'; González (yellow card) 83'; Garcia Jr. (yellow card) 93'; Peña Marquez (yellow card) 98'; Ayala (yellow card) 102'; Pedroza 107'; Villarino (yellow card) 109' (yellow-red card) 110'	Stadium: Lubbock Cooper's Pirate Stadium; Attendance: 5,842

==== Southeast Conference playoffs ====
Semifinals; July 12
1	**Apotheos FC**	**4**
4	Charlottetowne Hops FC	1
2	Appalachian FC	2
3	**Georgia Revolution FC**	**3**

Final; July 15
1	**Apotheos FC**	**4***
3	Georgia Revolution FC	3

Bold = winner
* = after extra time, ( ) = penalty shootout score, FF = forfeit

July 12, 2023 Conference Semifinals	Appalachian FC	**2–3**	**Georgia Revolution FC**	Boone, North Carolina
7:00 PM EDT	Landau 8'; Bates (yellow card) 44'; Render 65'; Leech (yellow card) 68'	Report	Schorah (yellow card) 43'; Whitten 50', 82'; Wilson 78'; Jones (yellow card) 78'; Longino (yellow card) 88'	Stadium: ASU Soccer Stadium; Attendance: 2,608

July 12, 2023 Conference Semifinals	**Apotheos FC**	**4–1**	Charlottetowne Hops FC	Kennesaw, Georgia
7:00 PM CDT	Rios 12'; Jawneh 25', 49'; Diakite (yellow card) 32'; Sumo Jr 80'	Report	Martinovic (yellow card) 52'; Lopes 64'; Sagnol (yellow card) 82'	Stadium: North Cobb Christian School

July 15, 2023 Conference Final	**Apotheos FC**	**4–3** (a.e.t.)	Georgia Revolution FC	Kennesaw, Georgia
7:00 PM EDT	Sandoval (yellow card) 30' (goal) 80', 120+'; Jawneh 85'; Gerewou (red card) 88'; Sumo Jr 100' (yellow card) 100'	Report	Jimenez (yellow card) 23'; Schorah 28'; Orson (yellow card) 35'; Whitten 50'; Ringdahl (red card) 54'; Chisholm (yellow card) 66'; Beam (yellow card) 104'; Jones (yellow card) 110'; Green 114'	Stadium: North Cobb Christian School

=== East Region Conference playoffs ===
==== Keystone East Conference playoffs ====
Final; July 15
1	**FC Motown**	**3***
2	Atlantic City FC	0

Bold = winner
* = after extra time, ( ) = penalty shootout score, FF = forfeit

July 15, 2023 Conference Final	**FC Motown**	**3–0** (a.e.t.)	Atlantic City FC	Montclair, New Jersey
7:00 PM EDT	Pompée (yellow card) 30'; Cordeiro (yellow card) 38'; Lema (yellow card) 45'; Perez (yellow card) 48'; Bermudez 105+1', 110', (yellow card) 105+1'; Descalzo 112'	Report; Broadcast	Cahill (yellow card) 91'; Leray (yellow card) 104'; Cleary (red card) 115'; Mollis (yellow card) 118'	Stadium: MSU Soccer Park at Pittser Field

==== Keystone West Conference playoffs ====
Final; July 15
1	**West Chester United**	**2**
2	Hershey FC	1

Bold = winner
* = after extra time, ( ) = penalty shootout score, FF = forfeit

July 15, 2023 Conference Final	**West Chester United SC**	**2–1**	Hershey FC	Wayne, Pennsylvania
7:00 PM EDT	1' (o.g.); Burgess 14'; Floyd (yellow card) 51'; Slack (yellow card) 55'	Report	Olsen 20' (yellow card) 58'; Johnson (yellow card) 23'; Lamarca (yellow card) 34'	Stadium: YSC Sports

==== Mid-Atlantic Conference playoffs ====
Semifinals; July 12
1	**Annapolis Blues FC**	**4**
4	Grove United	1
2	Greenville United FC	0(3)
3	**Alexandria Reds**	**0(5)**

Final; July 15
1	**Annapolis Blues FC**	**2(4)**
3	Alexandria Reds	2(2)

Bold = winner
* = after extra time, ( ) = penalty shootout score, FF = forfeit

July 12, 2023 Conference Semifinals	Greenville United FC	**0–0** (a.e.t.) (**3–5** p)	**Alexandria Reds**	Okatie, South Carolina
7:00 PM EDT	Mbye (yellow card) 22'; Fowler (yellow card) 60'	Report; PK Shootout Info	Joseph (yellow card) 53'; Jagha (yellow card) 60'; Culcleasure (yellow card) 63'; Boone (yellow card) 80'	Stadium: St. John Paul II Catholic School; Attendance: 500+
	**Penalties**
	Penalty scored Penalty missed		Penalty scored

July 12, 2023 Conference Semifinals	**Annapolis Blues FC**	**4–1**	Grove United	Annapolis, Maryland
7:00 PM EDT	Harris 15'; Murrell 22'; De Jesus 36'; Bernlohr 59'	Report	Senior 37' (yellow card) 83'	Stadium: Navy–Marine Corps Memorial Stadium; Attendance: 7,082

July 15, 2023 Conference Final	**Annapolis Blues FC**	**2–2** (a.e.t.) (**4–2** p)	Alexandria Reds	Annapolis, Maryland
7:00 PM EDT	Bernlohr 31'; Ruckman (red card) 52'; Oliveira Santos (yellow card) 62'; Murrell 90+6'	Report	Jagha (yellow card) 42'; Esteves (yellow card) 45'; Barnard 65', 83' (pen.); Joseph (yellow card) 76'; Aguilar (red card) 78'; Ventura (yellow card) 114' (yellow-red card) 115'	Stadium: Navy–Marine Corps Memorial Stadium; Attendance: 8,480
	**Penalties**
	Santos (penalty scored); de Jesus (penalty scored); Davis (penalty scored); Lam (penalty missed); Murrell (penalty scored)		(penalty scored) Esteves; (penalty missed) Ankrah; (penalty scored) Zouantcha; (penalty missed) Hormozi

==== North Atlantic Conference playoffs ====
Semifinal; July 12			Final; July 15
			1	Kingston Stockade FC	1
2	**Hartford City FC**	**2**	2	**Hartford City FC**	**2***
3	New York Shockers	1

Bold = winner
* = after extra time, ( ) = penalty shootout score, FF = forfeit

July 12, 2023 Conference Semifinal	**Hartford City FC**	**2–1**	New York Shockers	Mansfield, Connecticut
8:00 PM EDT	Cleary (yellow card) 32'; McGonigle 37' (pen.); Osiecki 52', (yellow card) 77'; Chandler (yellow card) 67'	Report	Bellù 11' (yellow card) 26'; Cekic (yellow card) 89'; Sams (yellow card) 90+5'	Stadium: Mansfield Athletic Outdoor Complex

July 15, 2023 Conference Final	Kingston Stockade FC	**1–2** (a.e.t.)	**Hartford City FC**	Poughkeepsie, New York
7:00 PM EDT	Juleau (yellow card) 48'; Fecci (yellow card) 69'; Nguionza (yellow card) 81' (goal) 120+1'; Schulman (yellow card) 90+'; Bunjaj (yellow card) 103'	Report	Tomas (yellow card) 66'; Dionne (yellow card) 104' (goal) 106'; Hamilton 108'	Stadium: Tenney Stadium

=== Regional and National playoffs ===
Regional semifinals July 15–21
GG1	**El Farolito**	**1***
GG2	Napa Valley 1839 FC	0
SW	FC Arizona	1
NW	**Crossfire Red**	**2**
MW1	**Steel City FC**	**0(6)**
MW4	Med City FC	0(5)
MW2	Des Moines United FC	3
MW3	**Tulsa Athletic**	**4**
S1	Naples United FC	0
S4	**Apotheos FC**	**1**
S2	**Southern States SC**	**2**
S3	Brownsville NPSL	0
E1	**FC Motown**	**4**
E4	Hartford City FC	2
E2	Annapolis Blues FC	0
E3	**West Chester United**	**4**

Regional Finals; July 22
W1	El Farolito	2
W2	**Crossfire Red**	**3***
MW1	Steel City FC	1
MW3	**Tulsa Athletic**	**2***
S4	**Apotheos FC**	**2**
S2	Southern States SC	1
E1	FC Motown	1
E3	**West Chester United**	**4**

National semifinals July 29
3	Crossfire Red	0
2	**Tulsa Athletic**	4
4	**Apotheos FC**	3*
1	West Chester United	1

National Final; August 5
2	**Tulsa Athletic**	1(8)
4	Apotheos FC	1(7)

Bold = winner
* = after extra time, ( ) = penalty shootout score, FF = forfeit

1. ^{C} The remaining four teams are reseeded for the national semifinals.

==== Regional Semifinals ====
July 15, 2023 West Region Semifinals	FC Arizona	**1–2**	**Crossfire Red**	Gilbert, Arizona
7:30 PM MDT	Afonso 22'	Report; Broadcast	Aman (yellow card) 39', (goal) 45+3'; Kossa-Rienzi 56'; Soto (yellow card) 89'; John (yellow card) 90+3' (yellow-red card) 90+5'	Stadium: Campo Verde High School

July 16, 2023 West Region Semifinals	**El Farolito**	**1–0** (a.e.t.)	Napa Valley 1839 FC	San Francisco, California
7:00 PM PDT	Delgado (yellow card) 17'; Arias (yellow card) 51'; Perez (yellow card) 79'; Buitrago 96'	Report	Pavon (yellow card) 66'; Martins (yellow card) 81'; Sakou (yellow card) 95'; Ayala (yellow card) 105'; Paniagua (yellow card) 112'	Stadium: Boxer Stadium
Note: This match also served as the NPSL Golden Gate Conference Final.

July 21, 2023 Midwest Region Semifinals	**Steel City FC**	**0–0** (a.e.t.) (**6–5** p)	Med City FC	Indianola, Iowa
4:00 PM CDT	Sullivan (yellow card) 41'; Mertz (yellow card) 115'	Report	Tolbert (yellow card) 45'; Rasmussen (yellow card) 104'	Stadium: Indianola Football Field
	**Penalties**
	Hutter (penalty missed)		(penalty missed) Millard
Note: Midwest Region playoffs hosted by #2 Des Moines United FC

July 21, 2023 Midwest Region Semifinals	Des Moines United FC	**3–4**	**Tulsa Athletic**	Indianola, Iowa
7:00 PM CDT	Arnoud (yellow card) 40' (goal) 76'; Malaguez 70'; Borges 75'; Chagour (yellow card) 80'	Report	Flores 14'; Ugbah 39'; Torres (yellow card) 41'; Diallo 56'; Mello 57'; Moreno (yellow card) 83'	Stadium: Indianola Football Field
Note: Midwest Region playoffs hosted by #2 Des Moines United FC

July 21, 2023 South Region Semifinals	**Southern States SC**	**2–0**	Brownsville NPSL	Naples, Florida
5:00 PM EDT	Gonzalez 3'; Hoyos 31'; Gardner (yellow card) 35'; Walsh (yellow card) 60'	Report	Reyes (yellow card) 28'; Reyes (yellow card) 33'; Garcia Jr (yellow card) 44' (yellow-red card) 90+10'; Espinoza (yellow card) 48'; Huerta (yellow card) 51'; Gonzalez (red card) 54'; Robles (yellow card) 58' (yellow-red card) 90+2'; Jacome (red card) 90+2'	Stadium: Paradise Coast Sports Complex
Note: South Region playoffs hosted by #1 Naples United FC

July 21, 2023 South Region Semifinals	Naples United FC	**0–1**	**Apotheos FC**	Naples, Florida
8:00 PM EDT	Paluck (yellow card) 18'; Jimenez (yellow card) 21' (yellow-red card) 48'; Marisi (yellow card) 43'; Furione (yellow card) 72'; Arpino (yellow card) 89'	Report	Jawneh (yellow card) 17'; Sandoval 25'; Dante (yellow card) 90+2'; Diakite (yellow card) 90+4'	Stadium: Paradise Coast Sports Complex
Note: South Region playoffs hosted by #1 Naples United FC

July 21, 2023 East Region Semifinals	Annapolis Blues FC	**0–4**	**West Chester United SC**	Montclair, New Jersey
4:00 PM EDT	Davis (yellow card) 16'; Hemmendinger (yellow card) 59'; Santos (yellow card) 75'	Report	Bachstein 3'; Robinson 12'; Roby 44'; Petrera 90+6'	Stadium: MSU Soccer Park at Pittser Field
Note: East Region playoffs hosted by #1 FC Motown

July 21, 2023 East Region Semifinals	**FC Motown**	**4–2**	Hartford City FC	Montclair, New Jersey
7:00 PM EDT	Bermudez 3'; Fala 18' (yellow card) 63'; Catania 66' (yellow card) 68'; da Fonte (yellow card) 71'; Muniz (yellow card) 81'; Rocca 87' (pen.)	Report	Williams 35' (yellow card) 55'; Southern 52'; McGonigle (yellow card) 79'	Stadium: MSU Soccer Park at Pittser Field
Note: East Region playoffs hosted by #1 FC Motown

==== Regional Finals ====
July 22, 2023 South Region Final	Southern States SC	**1–2**	**Apotheos FC**	Naples, Florida
7:00 PM EDT	Kabambala (yellow card) 59'; Davies 65'; Reid (yellow card) 88'	Report	Okonkwo (yellow card) 8'; Sumo JR 22'; Dampha (yellow card) 55'; Sandoval 66' (yellow card) 90'; Rios (yellow card) 77'	Stadium: Community School of Naples
Note: South Region playoffs hosted by #1 Naples United FC

July 22, 2023 East Region Final	FC Motown	**1–4**	**West Chester United SC**	Montclair, New Jersey
7:00 PM EDT	Rocca 8'; Pompe (yellow card) 16'; Ashitey (yellow card) 41' (yellow-red card) 58'; Irwin (red card) 59'; Fala (yellow card) 84'; Holland (yellow card) 90'	Report	Axtman 30'; Ricks 34'; Davis (yellow card) 45'; Slack 48'; New (yellow card) 49'; Comber (yellow card) 60'; Jammes (yellow card) 70'; Jasinski (yellow card) 73'; Roby 80'	Stadium: MSU Soccer Park at Pittser Field
Note: East Region playoffs hosted by #1 FC Motown

July 22, 2023 Midwest Region Final	Steel City FC	**1–2** (a.e.t.)	**Tulsa Athletic**	Indianola, Iowa
7:00 PM CDT	Albayeros (yellow card) 11' (yellow-red card) 120'; Emanuel (yellow card) 70'; DeVaul (yellow card) 71'; Akongo 84'; Prex (yellow card) 90'; Gandhi (red card) 120'; Kopay (red card) 120'	Report	Diallo 27' (yellow card) 110'; Flores (yellow card) 77'; Grant (yellow card) 90'; Ferrell (yellow card) 90'; Ugbah 109'	Stadium: Indianola Football Field
Note: Midwest Region playoffs hosted by #2 Des Moines United FC

July 22, 2023 West Region Final	El Farolito	**2–3** (a.e.t.)	**Crossfire Red**	San Francisco, California
4:00 PM PDT	Benson 24' (yellow card) 81'; Martinez (yellow card) 34'; Arias (yellow card) 57'; Mosquera 59'; Lizarralde (yellow card) 95'; Becerra (yellow card) 103'; Arias (yellow card) 109'; Perez (yellow card) 120+'; Soto (yellow card) 120+'		Diop (yellow card) 26' (yellow-red card) 120'; Kossa-Rienzi 88', 108'; Haddadi 90'; Aman (yellow card) 120'	Stadium: Kezar Stadium

==== National Semifinals ====
July 29, 2023 National Semifinals	West Chester United SC	**1–3** (a.e.t.)	**Apotheos FC**	Swarthmore, Pennsylvania
7:00 PM EDT	Jasinski 45'; Roby (yellow card) 78'; Sheridan (yellow card) 105'; Ricks (yellow card) 115'; New (yellow card) 119'; Floyd (yellow card) 119'	Report	Kamdem 26'; Gerewou (yellow card) 57'; Diakite (yellow card) 59'; Dampha (yellow card) 77' (yellow-red card) 80'; Sumo Jr 103'; Okonkwo 105' (pen.)	Stadium: Clothier Field Stadium

July 29, 2023 National Semifinals	**Tulsa Athletic**	**4–0**	Crossfire Red	Claremore, Oklahoma
7:30 PM CDT	Flores 39', 53', 75'; Oliveira 45+3' (pen.)	Report	Jones (yellow card) 15'; Gallagher (yellow card) 23' (yellow-red card) 45+1'	Stadium: Soldier Field

==== 2023 NPSL National Championship Game ====
August 5, 2023
7:30 PM CDT
National Final

Tulsa Athletic	1–1 (a.e.t.)	Apotheos FC
Taylor 90+2'	Report	Kamden (yellow card) 50'; Irving (yellow card) 52'; Gerewu (yellow card) 68'; Sandoval 80'; Uribe (yellow card) 88'; Rios (yellow card) 117'
Penalties
Taylor (penalty scored); Gordon (penalty scored); Nunez (penalty scored); Ruiz (penalty scored); Torres (penalty scored); Mallon (penalty missed); Flores (penalty scored); Berry (penalty scored); Lopez (penalty scored)	8–7	(penalty scored) Sandoval; (penalty scored) Rios; (penalty scored) Kamdem; (penalty scored) Uribe; (penalty scored) Ceesay; (penalty missed) Williams; (penalty scored) Williams; (penalty scored) Diakite; (penalty missed) Alerte

Soldier Field, Claremore, Oklahoma
Attendance: 1,573

Championship MVP: Bryson Reed (TUL)
