= Charlottetowne Hops FC =

- Founded: 2023; 3 years ago
- Ground: CSA OrthoCarolina Sportsplex
- Capacity: 1,000
- Manager: Morteza Ebrahimi
- League: NPSL
- 2026: 5th, Southeast
- Website: Website

Charlottetowne Hops FC is a United States soccer club based in Charlotte, North Carolina currently competing in the Southeast Conference of the National Premier Soccer League.

== Stadium ==
The club plays its home matches at the 1,000-seat CSA OrthoCarolina Sportsplex in Pineville.

== History ==
Charlottetowne Hops FC was announced as an expansion team for the National Premier Soccer League in February 2023, with the club entering the 2023 season. The club's ownership group included Casey Carr, Michael Hitchcock, and Matt Spear.

== Record ==
=== Seasons ===
Key

Champion Runners-up 3rd Place

Season	League									Play-offs (Conference)	Play-offs (Regional)	Play-offs (National)	Coach	Notes
Season	Div.	Pos. (Conference)	Pl.	W	D	L	GF	GA	Pts.	Play-offs (Conference)	Play-offs (Regional)	Play-offs (National)	Coach	Notes
2023	NPSL	4th	10	4	4	2	18	18	14	Semi-finals	DNQ	DNQ	(Iran) Morteza Ebrahimi	
2024	NPSL	4th	10	5	2	3	19	9	17	Semi-finals	DNQ	DNQ	(Iran) Morteza Ebrahimi	
2025	NPSL	3rd	10	5	1	4	25	20	16	Semi-finals	DNQ	DNQ	(Iran) Morteza Ebrahimi	
2026	NPSL	5th	10	3	2	5	13	14	11	DNQ	DNQ	DNQ	(Iran) Morteza Ebrahimi	

Source: NPSL
