= Apotheos FC =

Apotheos
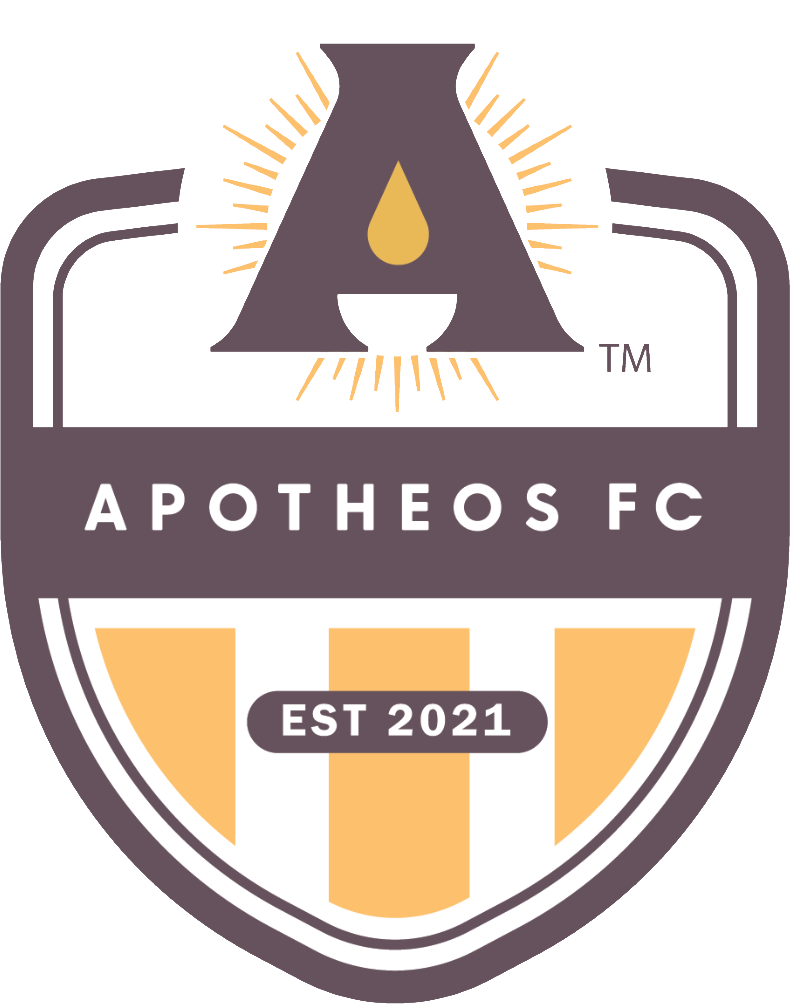
- Full name: Apotheos Football Club
- Nickname: The Locomotives
- Founded: 2021; 5 years ago
- Ground: Atlanta Silverbacks Park, Atlanta, Georgia
- Capacity: 5,000
- General manager: Chris Arrigali
- Head coach: Jonathan Mercado
- League: USL League Two
- 2023: 1st, Southeast Conference; Playoffs: National finalist (NPSL)
- Website: apotheosfc.com
Home colours

Apotheos FC is an American soccer club based out of the Metro Atlanta area. The club competes in the USL League Two as a member of the Eastern Conference - South Central Division.

== History ==
=== National Premier Soccer League ===
Apotheos FC joined the National Premier Soccer League (NPSL) as an expansion team on September 7, 2021, with plans to play in the 2022 season. The team reached the playoffs in its first season but fell to Appalachian FC, 4–1, in the Southeast Conference semifinals.

In 2023, after finishing the regular season atop the conference table, Apotheos went on to win the Southeast Conference championship. This was the team's first conference championship and first playoff honor overall. The team went on to win the South Region Championship for the first time and reached the 2023 NPSL National Championship, where it lost to Tulsa Athletic.

Apotheos qualified for its first U.S. Open Cup in 2024 based on its league results from the previous season.

=== USL League Two ===
In 2025, Apotheos FC joined USL League Two.

== Year-by-year ==
Year	Division	League	Record (W-D-L)	Regular season	Playoffs	U.S. Open Cup
2022	4	NPSL	3–5–2	4th, Southeast Conference	Conference Semifinal	Ineligible
2023	4	NPSL	6–3–1	1st, Southeast Conference	National Final	Did not qualify
2024	4	NPSL	6-2-2	3rd, Southeast Conference	Conference Semifinal	2nd Round
2025	4	USL League Two	1-2-9	9th, South Central Division	Did not qualify	Did not qualify
2026	4	USL League Two	2-3-7	7th, South Central Division	Did not qualify	Did not qualify

=== Grounds ===
- North Cobb Christian School; Kennesaw, GA (2022–2023)
- Atlanta Silverbacks Park; Atlanta, GA (2024–present)

== Honors ==
Honor		Champions	Runners-up
National Premier Soccer League	National championship		2023
National Premier Soccer League	Regional championship	2023	
National Premier Soccer League	Conference championship	2023	

U.S. Open Cup

- Participants (1): 2024
