= 2024 National Premier Soccer League season =

American amateur soccer league season

National Premier Soccer League
- Season: 2024
- Dates: March 9 – July 6 (regular season)
- Champions: El Farolito (1st Title)
- Regular season title: Las Vegas Legends FC (1st Title)
- Matches: 490
- Goals: 2,053 (4.19 per match)
- Best player: (Canada) Olivier Correa (West Texas FC)
- Top goalscorer: (United States) Angel Chavez (Virginia Dream FC) (United States) Philip Caputo (Joy St. Louis Park) (14 Goals Each)
- Best goalkeeper: (Spain) Vincent Sanchis (Dakota Fusion FC)
- Biggest home win: Grove 12–0 ARD (June 29)
- Biggest away win: ARD 0–12 Annapolis (May 17)
- Highest scoring: ARD 0–12 Annapolis (May 17)
- Longest winning run: LV Legends& El Farolito; 10 matches
- Longest unbeaten run: El Farolito; 17 matches
- Longest winless run: Oakland Stompers; 12 matches
- Longest losing run: Oakland Stompers; 12 matches
- All statistics correct as of 00:48, July 24, 2024 (UTC).

The 2024 National Premier Soccer League season is the 22nd season of the National Premier Soccer League.

The regular season began on March 9 and ends on July 6. In total, 92 teams participated in this season.

== Format changes ==
The Northwest Conference was dissolved, and the West Region now consists the Golden Gate Conference and the Southwest Conference. The Sunshine and Gulf Coast Conferences were combined and are now the Gulf Coast Sunshine Conference. Kansas City Sol will move from the Heartland Conference to the Gateway Conference. California Odyssey SC will move from the Southwest Conference to the Golden Gate Conference. First State FC moved from Keystone East Conference to Keystone West Conference. Greenville United FC will move from Mid-Atlantic Conference to Southeast Conference.

== Teams ==
Note: Teams that are italicized previously played in the NPSL and are returning from hiatus.

=== Incoming teams ===
- Alexandria Rough Diamonds
- Bristol Rhythm AFC
- Columbus United FC
- DMV Elite FC
- FCAZ Tucson
- Flower City Union
- Gio's Lions SC Chicago
- Glendale Lions FC
- Hickory FC
- Las Vegas Knights FC
- Minnesota Blizzard FC
- New Jersey United Athletic Cub
- Niagara 1812
- Port City FC
- Siouxland United FC
- Southern Indiana Guardians FC
- WC Predators
- Wisconsin Conquerors FC

=== Name changes ===
Brownsville NPSL to FC Brownsville

=== Departing teams ===
- Central Texas Coyotes FC (joined UPSL)
- Corinthians FC of San Antonio (joined UPSL)
- FC Davis (joined UPSL)
- Northern Virginia United FC (joined UPSL)
- Sonoma County Sol (joined UPSL)
- Tulsa Athletic (suspended by NPSL, joined TLFC)

=== Teams on hiatus or folded ===
- Atlético de Miami Beach
- Carpathia FC
- FC Columbus
- Crossfire Redmond (Red & White)
- Florida Roots FC
- Gallos FC
- Georgia Revolution FC
- Georgia Storm FC
- International Portland Select FC
- Iowa Raptors FC
- La Crosse Aris FC
- Med City FC
- OSA Seattle FC
- Reign FK
- Southern States SC
- Torch FC

== Standings and results ==
=== West Region ===
==== Golden Gate Conference ====
Pos	Team	Pld	W	L	T	GF	GA	GD	Pts	PPG	Qualification
1	El Farolito (C)	12	9	0	3	42	8	+34	30	2.50	Golden Gate Conference playoffs
2	Napa Valley 1839 FC (Q)	12	9	3	0	34	18	+16	27	2.25	Golden Gate Conference playoffs
3	San Ramon FC (Q)	12	6	2	4	29	19	+10	22	1.83	Golden Gate Conference playoffs
4	Sacramento Gold (Q)	12	5	5	2	27	23	+4	17	1.42	Golden Gate Conference playoffs
5	Oakland SC	12	4	7	1	22	22	0	13	1.08	
6	California Odyssey SC	12	3	7	2	23	29	−6	11	0.92	
7	Oakland Stompers	12	0	12	0	8	66	−58	0	0.00	

Source: NPSL
Rules for classification: 1) points; 2) head-to-head; 3) goal differential in head-to-head results; 4) wins; 5) total goal differential; 6) fewest losses; 7) coin toss. If three or more teams are tied on points, a mini-table involving only the tied teams is used, and teams are ranked in the mini-table on points. If two teams are tied on points in the mini-table, the two-team rules for classification apply. If three or more teams are tied on points in the mini-table, they are ranked based on 1) wins in conference competition; 2) total goal differential in conference competition; 3) fewest losses in conference competition; 4) coin toss.
(C) Champions; (Q) Qualified for the phase indicated

==== Southwest Conference ====
Pos	Team	Pld	W	L	T	GF	GA	GD	Pts	PPG	Qualification
1	Las Vegas Legends FC (Q)	10	10	0	0	49	11	+38	30	3.00	Southwest Conference playoffs
2	FC Arizona (C)	10	7	2	1	31	12	+19	22	2.20	Southwest Conference playoffs
3	Lions United FC	10	6	3	1	44	14	+30	19	1.90	
4	FCAZ Tucson	10	2	8	0	10	37	−27	6	0.60	
5	Glendale Lions FC	6	0	6	0	2	30	−28	0	0.00	
6	Las Vegas Knights FC	6	0	6	0	4	36	−32	0	0.00	

Source: NPSL
Rules for classification: 1) points; 2) head-to-head; 3) goal differential in head-to-head results; 4) wins; 5) total goal differential; 6) fewest losses; 7) coin toss. If three or more teams are tied on points, a mini-table involving only the tied teams is used, and teams are ranked in the mini-table on points. If two teams are tied on points in the mini-table, the two-team rules for classification apply. If three or more teams are tied on points in the mini-table, they are ranked based on 1) wins in conference competition; 2) total goal differential in conference competition; 3) fewest losses in conference competition; 4) coin toss.
(C) Champions; (Q) Qualified for the phase indicated

=== Midwest Region ===
==== Gateway Conference ====
Pos	Team	Pld	W	L	T	GF	GA	GD	Pts	PPG	Qualification
1	Gio's Lions SC Chicago (Q)	9	6	1	2	27	15	+12	20	2.22	Gateway Conference playoffs
2	Kansas City Sol (Q)	10	6	1	3	30	19	+11	21	2.10	Gateway Conference playoffs
3	Des Moines United FC (C)	10	6	2	2	25	16	+9	20	2.00	Gateway Conference playoffs
4	FC Milwaukee Torrent (Q)	9	5	2	2	39	15	+24	17	1.89	Gateway Conference playoffs
5	Sunflower State FC	10	3	4	3	23	16	+7	12	1.20	
6	Club Atletico Saint Louis	10	2	5	3	16	27	−11	9	0.90	
7	Ehtar Belleville FC	10	1	6	3	20	36	−16	6	0.60	
8	Wisconsin Conquerors FC	10	0	8	2	7	44	−37	2	0.20	

Source: NPSL
Rules for classification: 1) points; 2) head-to-head; 3) goal differential in head-to-head results; 4) wins; 5) total goal differential; 6) fewest losses; 7) coin toss. If three or more teams are tied on points, a mini-table involving only the tied teams is used, and teams are ranked in the mini-table on points. If two teams are tied on points in the mini-table, the two-team rules for classification apply. If three or more teams are tied on points in the mini-table, they are ranked based on 1) wins in conference competition; 2) total goal differential in conference competition; 3) fewest losses in conference competition; 4) coin toss.
(C) Champions; (Q) Qualified for the phase indicated

==== Great Lakes Conference ====
Pos	Team	Pld	W	L	T	GF	GA	GD	Pts	PPG	Qualification
1	Steel City FC (C)	10	7	0	3	36	8	+28	24	2.40	Great Lakes Conference Semifinal
2	Akron City FC (Q)	10	8	2	0	43	10	+33	24	2.40	Great Lakes Conference Semifinal
3	Michigan Rangers FC (Q)	10	6	2	2	34	16	+18	20	2.00	Great Lakes Conference Semifinal
4	Flower City Union (Q)	10	5	4	1	26	24	+2	16	1.60	Great Lakes Conference Semifinal
5	Cleveland SC	10	5	4	1	27	19	+8	16	1.60	
6	Erie Commodores	10	3	4	3	28	21	+7	12	1.20	
7	Southern Indiana Guardians FC	10	0	9	1	9	55	−46	1	0.10	
8	Niagara 1812	10	0	9	1	2	52	−50	1	0.10	

Source: NPSL
Rules for classification: 1) points; 2) head-to-head; 3) goal differential in head-to-head results; 4) wins; 5) total goal differential; 6) fewest losses; 7) coin toss. If three or more teams are tied on points, a mini-table involving only the tied teams is used, and teams are ranked in the mini-table on points. If two teams are tied on points in the mini-table, the two-team rules for classification apply. If three or more teams are tied on points in the mini-table, they are ranked based on 1) wins in conference competition; 2) total goal differential in conference competition; 3) fewest losses in conference competition; 4) coin toss.
(C) Champions; (Q) Qualified for the phase indicated

==== North Conference ====
Pos	Team	Pld	W	L	T	GF	GA	GD	Pts	PPG	Qualification
1	Dakota Fusion FC (Q)	12	9	0	3	34	4	+30	30	2.50	North Conference playoffs
2	Duluth FC (C)	12	7	4	1	41	17	+24	22	1.83	North Conference playoffs
3	Minnesota Twin Stars FC (Q)	12	6	4	2	23	25	−2	20	1.67	North Conference playoffs
4	Joy St. Louis Park (Q)	12	6	4	2	25	23	+2	20	1.67	North Conference playoffs
5	Siouxland United FC	12	6	6	0	25	24	+1	18	1.50	
6	Sioux Falls Thunder FC	12	1	7	4	10	27	−17	7	0.58	
7	Minnesota Blizzard FC	12	0	10	2	10	48	−38	2	0.17	

Source: NPSL
Rules for classification: 1) points; 2) head-to-head; 3) goal differential in head-to-head results; 4) wins; 5) total goal differential; 6) fewest losses; 7) coin toss. If three or more teams are tied on points, a mini-table involving only the tied teams is used, and teams are ranked in the mini-table on points. If two teams are tied on points in the mini-table, the two-team rules for classification apply. If three or more teams are tied on points in the mini-table, they are ranked based on 1) wins in conference competition; 2) total goal differential in conference competition; 3) fewest losses in conference competition; 4) coin toss.
(C) Champions; (Q) Qualified for the phase indicated

=== South Region ===
==== Gulf Coast Sunshine Conference ====
===== Group A =====
Pos	Team	Pld	W	L	T	GF	GA	GD	Pts	PPG	Qualification
1	Naples United FC (Q)	10	7	2	1	27	8	+19	22	2.20	Gulf Coast Sunshine Conference Semifinals
2	Jacksonville Armada FC U-23 (Q)	10	6	2	2	27	10	+17	20	2.00	Gulf Coast Sunshine Conference Quarterfinals
3	Miami Dutch Lions FC (Q)	10	3	7	0	18	21	−3	9	0.90	Gulf Coast Sunshine Conference Quarterfinals
4	Global Soccer Pathways	10	1	9	0	6	54	−48	3	0.30	

Source: NPSL
(Q) Qualified for the phase indicated

===== Group B =====
Pos	Team	Pld	W	L	T	GF	GA	GD	Pts	PPG	Qualification
1	Pensacola FC (Q)	10	7	2	1	24	6	+18	22	2.20	Gulf Coast Sunshine Conference Semifinals
2	Columbus United FC (C)	10	4	3	3	16	12	+4	15	1.50	Gulf Coast Sunshine Conference Quarterfinals
3	Tallahassee SC (Q)	10	4	4	2	17	18	−1	14	1.40	Gulf Coast Sunshine Conference Quarterfinals
4	New Orleans Jesters	10	2	5	3	16	22	−6	9	0.90	

Source: NPSL
Rules for classification: 1) points; 2) head-to-head; 3) goal differential in head-to-head results; 4) wins; 5) total goal differential; 6) fewest losses; 7) coin toss. If three or more teams are tied on points, a mini-table involving only the tied teams is used, and teams are ranked in the mini-table on points. If two teams are tied on points in the mini-table, the two-team rules for classification apply. If three or more teams are tied on points in the mini-table, they are ranked based on 1) wins in conference competition; 2) total goal differential in conference competition; 3) fewest losses in conference competition; 4) coin toss.
(C) Champions; (Q) Qualified for the phase indicated

==== Heartland Conference ====
Pos	Team	Pld	W	L	T	GF	GA	GD	Pts	PPG	Qualification
1	OKC 1889 FC (C)	6	4	1	1	12	8	+4	13	2.17	Heartland Conference playoffs
2	Arkansas Wolves FC	5	2	1	2	8	7	+1	8	1.60	
3	Demize NPSL	5	0	4	1	5	10	−5	1	0.20	

Updated to match(es) played on 7/2/2024. Source: NPSL
Rules for classification: 1) points; 2) head-to-head; 3) goal differential in head-to-head results; 4) wins; 5) total goal differential; 6) fewest losses; 7) coin toss. If three or more teams are tied on points, a mini-table involving only the tied teams is used, and teams are ranked in the mini-table on points. If two teams are tied on points in the mini-table, the two-team rules for classification apply. If three or more teams are tied on points in the mini-table, they are ranked based on 1) wins in conference competition; 2) total goal differential in conference competition; 3) fewest losses in conference competition; 4) coin toss.
(C) Champions

==== Lone Star Conference ====
Pos	Team	Pld	W	L	T	GF	GA	GD	Pts	PPG	Qualification
1	West Texas FC (C)	10	7	2	1	33	16	+17	22	2.20	Lone Star Conference playoffs
2	FC Brownsville (Q)	10	6	1	3	24	11	+13	21	2.10	Lone Star Conference playoffs
3	Denton Diablos FC (Q)	10	5	3	2	19	16	+3	17	1.70	Lone Star Conference playoffs
4	Laredo Heat SC (Q)	10	5	3	2	19	13	+6	17	1.70	Lone Star Conference playoffs
5	Lubbock Matadors SC	10	5	4	1	22	19	+3	16	1.60	
6	CF10 Houston FC	10	3	5	2	20	27	−7	11	1.10	
7	Austin United FC	10	2	7	1	14	24	−10	7	0.70	
8	Fort Worth Vaqueros FC	10	0	8	2	9	34	−25	2	0.20	

Source: NPSL
Rules for classification: 1) points; 2) head-to-head; 3) goal differential in head-to-head results; 4) wins; 5) total goal differential; 6) fewest losses; 7) coin toss. If three or more teams are tied on points, a mini-table involving only the tied teams is used, and teams are ranked in the mini-table on points. If two teams are tied on points in the mini-table, the two-team rules for classification apply. If three or more teams are tied on points in the mini-table, they are ranked based on 1) wins in conference competition; 2) total goal differential in conference competition; 3) fewest losses in conference competition; 4) coin toss.
(C) Champions; (Q) Qualified for the phase indicated

==== Southeast Conference ====
Pos	Team	Pld	W	L	T	GF	GA	GD	Pts	PPG	Qualification
1	Appalachian FC (Q)	10	8	0	2	25	7	+18	26	2.60	Southeast Conference playoffs
2	Hickory FC (C)	10	7	2	1	26	14	+12	22	2.20	Southeast Conference playoffs
3	Apotheos FC (Q)	10	6	2	2	24	15	+9	20	2.00	Southeast Conference playoffs
4	Charlottetowne Hops FC (Q)	10	5	3	2	19	9	+10	17	1.70	Southeast Conference playoffs
5	865 Alliance	10	4	4	2	16	17	−1	14	1.40	
6	Greenville United	10	1	6	3	10	21	−11	6	0.60	
7	Bristol Rhythm AFC	10	2	8	0	10	26	−16	6	0.60	
8	Port City FC	10	0	8	2	11	32	−21	2	0.20	

Source: NPSL
Rules for classification: 1) points; 2) head-to-head; 3) goal differential in head-to-head results; 4) wins; 5) total goal differential; 6) fewest losses; 7) coin toss. If three or more teams are tied on points, a mini-table involving only the tied teams is used, and teams are ranked in the mini-table on points. If two teams are tied on points in the mini-table, the two-team rules for classification apply. If three or more teams are tied on points in the mini-table, they are ranked based on 1) wins in conference competition; 2) total goal differential in conference competition; 3) fewest losses in conference competition; 4) coin toss.
(C) Champions; (Q) Qualified for the phase indicated

=== East Region ===
==== Keystone East Conference ====
Pos	Team	Pld	W	L	T	GF	GA	GD	Pts	PPG	Qualification
1	FC Motown (C)	10	8	0	2	27	4	+23	26	2.60	Keystone East Conference playoffs
2	Jackson Lions FC (Q)	10	6	2	2	27	20	+7	20	2.00	Keystone East Conference playoffs
3	Atlantic City FC	10	5	4	1	19	17	+2	16	1.60	
4	FC Monmouth	10	3	6	1	13	24	−11	10	1.00	
5	WC Predators	10	2	6	2	12	25	−13	8	0.80	
6	Philadelphia Union Development Squad	10	1	7	2	18	26	−8	5	0.50	

Source: NPSL
Rules for classification: 1) points; 2) head-to-head; 3) goal differential in head-to-head results; 4) wins; 5) total goal differential; 6) fewest losses; 7) coin toss. If three or more teams are tied on points, a mini-table involving only the tied teams is used, and teams are ranked in the mini-table on points. If two teams are tied on points in the mini-table, the two-team rules for classification apply. If three or more teams are tied on points in the mini-table, they are ranked based on 1) wins in conference competition; 2) total goal differential in conference competition; 3) fewest losses in conference competition; 4) coin toss.
(C) Champions; (Q) Qualified for the phase indicated

==== Keystone West Conference ====
Pos	Team	Pld	W	L	T	GF	GA	GD	Pts	PPG	Qualification
1	West Chester United SC (C)	10	8	0	2	27	5	+22	26	2.60	Keystone West Conference playoffs
2	Electric City Shock SC (Q)	10	6	3	1	23	19	+4	19	1.90	Keystone West Conference playoffs
3	Pennsylvania Classics AC	10	6	3	1	20	12	+8	19	1.90	
4	Philadelphia Ukrainians Nationals SC	10	4	3	3	17	18	−1	15	1.50	
5	First State FC	10	0	7	3	12	31	−19	3	0.30	
6	Hershey FC	10	0	8	2	9	23	−14	2	0.20	

Source: NPSL
Rules for classification: 1) points; 2) head-to-head; 3) goal differential in head-to-head results; 4) wins; 5) total goal differential; 6) fewest losses; 7) coin toss. If three or more teams are tied on points, a mini-table involving only the tied teams is used, and teams are ranked in the mini-table on points. If two teams are tied on points in the mini-table, the two-team rules for classification apply. If three or more teams are tied on points in the mini-table, they are ranked based on 1) wins in conference competition; 2) total goal differential in conference competition; 3) fewest losses in conference competition; 4) coin toss.
(C) Champions; (Q) Qualified for the phase indicated

==== Mid-Atlantic Conference ====
Pos	Team	Pld	W	L	T	GF	GA	GD	Pts	PPG	Qualification
1	Annapolis Blues FC (Q)	10	9	1	0	48	11	+37	27	2.70	Mid-Atlantic Conference playoffs
2	Alexandria Reds (Q)	10	7	1	2	37	7	+30	23	2.30	Mid-Atlantic Conference playoffs
3	Virginia Dream FC (C)	10	6	2	2	37	18	+19	20	2.00	Mid-Atlantic Conference playoffs
4	FC Frederick (Q)	10	5	5	0	16	23	−7	15	1.50	Mid-Atlantic Conference playoffs
5	Grove United	10	4	4	2	29	16	+13	14	1.40	
6	DMV Elite FC	10	4	6	0	25	26	−1	12	1.20	
7	Virginia Beach City FC	10	2	8	0	11	38	−27	6	0.60	
8	Alexandria Rough Diamonds	10	0	10	0	6	70	−64	0	0.00	

Source: NPSL
Rules for classification: 1) points; 2) head-to-head; 3) goal differential in head-to-head results; 4) wins; 5) total goal differential; 6) fewest losses; 7) coin toss. If three or more teams are tied on points, a mini-table involving only the tied teams is used, and teams are ranked in the mini-table on points. If two teams are tied on points in the mini-table, the two-team rules for classification apply. If three or more teams are tied on points in the mini-table, they are ranked based on 1) wins in conference competition; 2) total goal differential in conference competition; 3) fewest losses in conference competition; 4) coin toss.
(C) Champions; (Q) Qualified for the phase indicated

==== North Atlantic Conference ====
Pos	Team	Pld	W	L	T	GF	GA	GD	Pts	PPG	Qualification
1	New York Shockers (C)	10	8	1	1	25	10	+15	25	2.50	North Atlantic Conference Final
2	Hartford City FC (Q)	10	7	2	1	20	8	+12	22	2.20	North Atlantic Conference Semifinal
3	New Jersey United AC (Q)	10	6	4	0	12	9	+3	18	1.80	North Atlantic Conference Semifinal
4	Syracuse FC	10	3	7	0	8	20	−12	9	0.90	
5	Kingston Stockade FC	10	2	7	1	11	16	−5	7	0.70	
6	Valeo FC	10	2	7	1	7	20	−13	7	0.70	

Source: NPSL
Rules for classification: 1) points; 2) head-to-head; 3) goal differential in head-to-head results; 4) wins; 5) total goal differential; 6) fewest losses; 7) coin toss. If three or more teams are tied on points, a mini-table involving only the tied teams is used, and teams are ranked in the mini-table on points. If two teams are tied on points in the mini-table, the two-team rules for classification apply. If three or more teams are tied on points in the mini-table, they are ranked based on 1) wins in conference competition; 2) total goal differential in conference competition; 3) fewest losses in conference competition; 4) coin toss.
(C) Champions; (Q) Qualified for the phase indicated

== Playoffs ==
Note: Games are hosted by the highest seed unless noted otherwise

=== West Region Conference playoffs ===
==== Golden Gate Conference playoffs ====
Semifinal; June 29
**1**	**El Farolito**	**4**
4	Sacramento Gold	2
**2**	**Napa Valley 1839 FC**	**2**
3	San Ramon FC	1

Final; July 13
**1**	**El Farolito**	**3**
2	Napa Valley 1839 FC	2

Bold = winner
* = after extra time, ( ) = penalty shootout score, FF = forfeit

June 29 Conference Semifinals	**El Farolito**	**4–2**	Sacramento Gold	San Francisco, California
6:15 PM PDT	Arias 11', 33', 46', 46' (yellow card) 29'; Yabur (yellow card) 13'; Kreye (yellow card) 44'; Quiroga (yellow card) 46'		Restani 8'; Mazzoni (yellow card) 18'; Montejano (yellow card) 30' (yellow-red card) 43'; Christian (yellow card) 46'; Vazques (red card) 46'; Gutierrez (yellow card) 46'	Stadium: Boxer Stadium

June 29 Conference Semifinals	**Napa Valley 1839 FC**	**2–1**	San Ramon FC	Napa, California
9:00 PM PDT	Gomez (yellow card) 46'		Guzman (yellow card) 46'; Del mundo (yellow card) 46'	Stadium: Dodd Stadium, Justin Siena HS

July 13 Conference Final	**El Farolito**	**3–2**	Napa Valley 1839 FC	San Francisco, California
7:30 PM PDT	E. Arias 28'; Valdivia 52'; Sidibe (yellow card) 57'; G. Arias 60', (yellow card) 89'; Sacre (yellow card) 65'; J. Arias (yellow card) 77'		Carreras (yellow card) 22', (goal) 46'; Pavon 83'	Stadium: Kezar Stadium

==== Southwest Conference playoffs ====
Final; July 13
1	Las Vegas Legends	FF (Note: Las Vegas Legends FC were ineligible for the 2024 playoffs due to not meeting their league financial obligations)
2	**FC Arizona**

Bold = winner
* = after extra time, ( ) = penalty shootout score, FF = forfeit

July 13 Conference Final	Las Vegas Legends	**FF**	**FC Arizona**
Note: Las Vegas Legends FC were ineligible for the 2024 playoffs due to not meeting their league financial obligations

=== Midwest Region Conference playoffs ===
==== Gateway Conference playoffs ====
Semifinals; July 10
1	Gio's Lions SC Chicago	0
**4**	**FC Milwaukee Torrent**	**1**
2	Kansas City Sol	1
**3**	**Des Moines United FC**	**5**

Finals; July 13
**3**	**Des Moines United FC**	**2**
4	FC Milwaukee Torrent	0

Bold = winner
* = after extra time, ( ) = penalty shootout score, FF = forfeit

July 10 Conference Semifinal	Kansas City Sol	**1–5**	**Des Moines United FC**	Parkville, Missouri
6:00 PM CDT				Stadium: Park University-Stadium

July 10 Conference Semifinal	Gio's Lions SC Chicago	**0–1**	**FC Milwaukee Torrent**	Wauwatosa, Wisconsin
7:00 PM CDT				Stadium: Hart Park

July 13 Conference Final	**Des Moines United FC**	**2–0**	FC Milwaukee Torrent	West Des Moines, Iowa
7:00 PM CDT	13' (o.g.); Ordaz 85'		Piscaglia (yellow card) 38'; Carles (yellow card) 90'	Stadium: MidAmerican RecPlex

==== Great Lakes Conference playoffs ====
Semifinal; July 10
**1**	**Steel City FC**	**3**
4	Flower City Union	2
**2**	**Akron City FC**	**4**
3	Michigan Rangers FC	0

Final; July 13
**1**	**Steel City FC**	**2**
2	Akron City FC	0

Bold = winner
* = after extra time, ( ) = penalty shootout score, FF = forfeit

July 10 Conference Semifinal	**Steel City FC**	**3–2**	Flower City Union	Cheswick, Pennsylvania
5:30 PM CDT	34' (o.g.); Bordoy 50'; DiFalco 55'		Mata 43'; Almeida 44'	Stadium: Founders Field

July 10 Conference Semifinal	**Akron City FC**	**4–0**	Michigan Rangers FC	Akron, Ohio
6:30 PM CDT				Stadium: St. Vincent - St. Mary High School-Green Street Stadium

July 13 Conference Final	**Steel City FC**	**2–0**	Akron City FC	Cheswick, Pennsylvania
5:30 PM CDT	7' (o.g.); Bordoy (yellow card) 41'; McIntyre 67'; Afawubo (yellow card) 89'		Cormier (yellow card) 58'; Lacerda (yellow card) 74'	Stadium: Founders Field

==== Heartland Conference playoffs ====
Conference champions was determined by regular season PPG. OKC 1889 FC win conference champions.

==== North Conference playoffs ====
Semifinals; July 10
**1**	**Dakota Fusion FC**	**2**
4	Joy St. Louis Park	1
**2**	**Duluth FC**	**2**
3	Minnesota Twin Stars	0

Final; July 13
1	Dakota Fusion FC	0
**2**	**Duluth FC**	**1**

Bold = winner
* = after extra time, ( ) = penalty shootout score, FF = forfeit

July 10 Conference Semifinals	**Dakota Fusion FC**	**2–1**	Joy St. Louis Park	Moorhead, Minnesota
6:00 PM CDT	Pinto 44'; Garcia (yellow card) 46'; Miyata 83'	Report	Kroeten 42'; Caputo (yellow card) 53'; Kantorowicz (yellow card) 87'; Kouame (yellow card) 89'	Stadium: Jim Gotta Stadium

July 10 Conference Semifinals	**Duluth FC**	**2–0** (a.e.t.)	Minnesota Twin Stars	Duluth, Minnesota
7:00 PM CDT	Sumner 98'			Stadium: Duluth Public School-Stadium

July 13 Conference Final	Dakota Fusion FC	**0–1**	**Duluth FC**	Moorhead, Minnesota
7:00 PM CDT	Han (yellow card) 23'; Pinto (yellow card) 43'; Robinson (yellow card) 76'		Nys 37'; Oyebamiji (yellow card) 62'; McDonnell (yellow card) 74'; Edmondson (yellow card) 78'	Stadium: Jim Gotta Stadium

=== South Region Conference playoffs ===
==== Gulf Coast Sunshine Conference playoffs ====
Quarterfinals; July 6
**A2**	**Jacksonville Armada U-23**	**9**
A3	Miami Dutch Lions FC	0
**B2**	**Columbus United FC**	**3**
B3	Tallahassee SC	2

Semifinals; July 10
A1	Naples United FC	0
**A2**	**Jacksonville Armada U-23**	**2**
B1	Pensacola FC	1
**B2**	**Columbus United FC**	**2**

Final; July 13
A2	Jacksonville Armada U-23	1
**B2**	**Columbus United FC**	**3**

Bold = winner
* = after extra time, ( ) = penalty shootout score, FF = forfeit

July 6 Conference Quarterfinals	**Jacksonville Armada U-23**	**9–0**	Miami Dutch Lions FC	Jacksonville, Florida
6:00 PM CDT	Vaccaro 6' (pen.); Moller-Jensen 7', 31', 43'; Zettl 13'; Ancelin 23', 44'; Machado 47' (pen.); Herb (yellow card) 57'; Skinner 89'	Report	Hernandez (yellow card) 46'	Stadium: Southern Oak Stadium

July 6 Conference Quarterfinals	**Columbus United FC**	**3–2** (a.e.t.)	**Tallahassee SC**	Columbus, Georgia
6:30 PM CDT	Csato 23'; Gallegos 46'; Santana (yellow card) 70'; Berg 120' (pen.) (yellow card) 120'	Report	Guebre (yellow card) 17' (yellow-red card) 44'; Jepson 18', 71' (pen.); Fontanelli (yellow card) 56'; Robertson (yellow card) 89'; Fitzgerald (yellow card) 89' (yellow-red card) 89'	Stadium: Kinnett Stadium

July 10 Conference Semifinals	Naples United FC	**0–2**	**Jacksonville Armada U-23**	Naples, Florida
6:00 PM CDT				Stadium: Paradise Coast Sports Complex

July 10 Conference Semifinals	Pensacola FC	**1–2**	**Columbus United FC**	Pensacola, Florida
7:00 PM CDT				Stadium: Ashton Brosnaham Park; Attendance: 500

July 13 Conference Final	Jacksonville Armada U-23	**1–3**	**Columbus United FC**	Jacksonville, Florida
6:00 PM CDT	Kvifte 6', (yellow card) 49'; Shanley (yellow card) 85'		Kawata 40'; Berg 66', (yellow card) 85'; Csato 85'	Stadium: EWC Community Field and Athletic Stadium

==== Lone Star Conference playoffs ====
Semifinals; July 10
**1**	**West Texas FC**	**5**
4	Laredo Heat	1
2	FC Brownsville	2
**3**	**Denton Diablos FC**	**3**

Final; July 13
**1**	**West Texas FC**	**4**
3	Denton Diablos FC	1

Bold = winner
* = after extra time, ( ) = penalty shootout score, FF = forfeit

July 10 Conference Semifinals	FC Brownsville	**2–3** (a.e.t.)	**Denton Diablos FC**	Brownsville, Texas
7:15 PM CDT	23'; 78'		Miralrio 17', 106'; Krumov 42'	Stadium: Brownsville Sports Park

July 10 Conference Semifinals	**West Texas FC**	**5–1**	Laredo Heat	Midland, Texas
7:30 PM CDT	Marques 7', 9'; Correa 27'; McCormick 45'; Stevenson 68'		Escobar 86'	Stadium: Astound Broadband Stadium

July 13 Conference Final	**West Texas FC**	**4–1**	Denton Diablos FC	Midland, Texas
7:30 PM CDT	Marques 10'; McCormick 19'; Naidoo 44', (yellow card) 55'; Stevenson 69'; Parish (yellow card) 85'		Reyes (yellow card) 11', (goal) 47' (pen.); Mays (yellow card) 61'; Menon (yellow card) 73'; Nava (yellow card) 88'	Stadium: Astound Broadband Stadium

==== Southeast Conference playoffs ====
Semifinals; July 10
**1**	**Appalachian FC**	**2**
4	Charlottetowne Hops FC	0
**2**	**Hickory FC**	**2**
3	Apotheos FC	1

Final; July 13
1	Appalachian FC	0
**2**	**Hickory FC**	**3**

Bold = winner
* = after extra time, ( ) = penalty shootout score, FF = forfeit

July 10 Conference Semifinals	**Appalachian FC**	**2–0** (a.e.t.)	Charlottetowne Hops FC	Boone, North Carolina
6:00 PM CDT	Reid-Stephen 103', 122'; 111'			Stadium: Ted Mackorell Soccer Complex

July 10 Conference Semifinals	**Hickory FC**	**2–1**	Apotheos FC	Hickory, North Carolina
6:00 PM CDT	Pollacchi 5'; Grolimund (yellow card) 14'; Salazar (yellow card) 19'; Arriezu 45+1'; Osadolor (yellow card) 73'; Rump (yellow card) 79'		Gonzalez (yellow card) 28'; Redd (yellow card) 30' (yellow-red card) 45+2'; Guzman (yellow card) 41'; Vivian (yellow card) 52'; Chisholm (yellow card) 78'; Guest 82' (pen.)	Stadium: Moretz Stadium; Attendance: 2,900+

July 13 Conference Final	Appalachian FC	**0–3**	**Hickory FC**	Boone, North Carolina
6:00 PM CDT	Birch (yellow card) 46'; De Graauw (yellow card) 53'; Raghoebar (yellow card) 65'		Salazar (yellow card) 38'; Osadolor 40'; Rubio Arriezu 83' (pen.); Renner 89'	Stadium: Ted Mackorell Soccer Complex; Attendance: 3,411

=== East Region Conference playoffs ===
==== Keystone East Conference playoffs ====
Final; July 13
**1**	**FC Motown**	**4**
2	Jackson Lions FC	1

Bold = winner
* = after extra time, ( ) = penalty shootout score, FF = forfeit

July 13 Conference Final	**FC Motown**	**4-1**	Jackson Lions FC	Madison, New Jersey
6:30 PM CDT	Cordeiro 11' (yellow card) 64'; Holland 49'; Germain 51'; Sow (yellow card) 31', (goal) 43'; Hope (yellow card) 72'		Ganzer 34'; Zalinsky (yellow card) 55'; Diaz (yellow card) 72'	Stadium: Drew University-Ranger Stadium; Attendance: 500

==== Keystone West Conference playoffs ====
Final; July 13
**1**	**West Chester United**	**4**
2	Electric City Shock SC	0

Bold = winner
* = after extra time, ( ) = penalty shootout score, FF = forfeit

July 13 Conference Final	**West Chester United SC**	**4–0**	Electric City Shock SC	Wayne, Pennsylvania
6:00 PM CDT	Robinson (yellow card) 20'; Axtman 33'; Slack 35', 40'; Wilson 46'; King (yellow card) 46'; Miller (yellow card) 46'		Borneo (yellow card) 28'; Owusu (yellow card) 43'; Sanchez (yellow card) 46'; Hardin (yellow card) 46'	Stadium: YSC Sports Field

==== Mid-Atlantic Conference playoffs ====
Semifinals; July 10
**1**	**Annapolis Blues FC**	**5**
4	FC Frederick	0
2	Alexandria Reds	2
**3**	**Virginia Dream FC**	**3**

Final; July 13
1	Annapolis Blues FC	0
**3**	**Virginia Dream FC**	**2**

Bold = winner
* = after extra time, ( ) = penalty shootout score, FF = forfeit

July 10 Conference Semifinals	**Annapolis Blues FC**	**5–0**	FC Frederick	Annapolis, Maryland
6:00 PM CDT	Shirley 21'; de Jesus 43'; Moniath		Gac (yellow card) 41'; Villatoro (yellow card)	Stadium: Navy–Marine Corps Memorial Stadium; Attendance: 7,036

July 10 Conference Semifinals	Alexandria Reds	**2–3**	**Virginia Dream FC**	Alexandria, Virginia
6:00 PM CDT				Stadium: Limerick Field

July 13 Conference Final	Annapolis Blues FC	**0–2**	**Virginia Dream FC**	Annapolis, Maryland
6:00 PM CDT	Wroblewski (yellow card) 15'; Shirley (yellow card) 45+7'; Thissell (yellow card) 90+6'; Palomo (yellow card) 90+6'		Hawkins 41'; Koffi (yellow card) 45+6'; Diaz (yellow card) 90', (goal) 90+7'; Hamid (yellow card) 90+7'; Asfaha (yellow card) 90+7'	Stadium: Navy–Marine Corps Memorial Stadium; Attendance: 8,124

==== North Atlantic Conference playoffs ====
Semifinal; July 10			Final; July 13
			**1**	**New York Shockers**	**1(5)**
**2**	**Hartford City FC**	**2(4)**	3	Hartford City FC	1(4)
3	New Jersey United AC	2(3)

Bold = winner
* = after extra time, ( ) = penalty shootout score, FF = forfeit

July 10 Conference Semifinal	**Hartford City FC**	**2–2** (a.e.t.) (**4–3** p)	New Jersey United AC	Portland, Connecticut
6:30 PM CDT				Stadium: Oakwood Soccer Park

July 13 Conference Final	**New York Shockers**	**1–1** (a.e.t.) (**5–4** SO)	Hartford City FC	Colonie, New York
6:00 PM CDT	Bellu 30' (pen.); DeFilippis (yellow card) 47'; Kajtazi (yellow card) 59'; Soumah (yellow card) 85'; Brennan (red card) 89'; Ehlin (yellow card) 91'; Cekic (yellow card) 98'		DiLoreto (yellow card) 29'; Bilbe 63'; Suski (yellow card) 81'; Silverman (yellow card) 91'	Stadium: Afrim's Sports Park
	**Shootout**
	Linge (penalty scored); DeFilippis (penalty scored); Winkelmann (penalty scored); Rouse (penalty scored); Cekic (penalty scored)		(penalty scored) Suski; (penalty scored) Southern; (penalty scored) Grant; (penalty scored) Bilbe

=== Regional and National playoffs ===
Regional semifinals July 17
**1**	**FC Motown**	**1**
4	Virginia Dream FC	0
2	West Chester United	2
**3**	**New York Shockers**	**3**
**1**	**West Texas FC**	**4**
4	OKC 1889 FC	1
**South Region**
2	Hickory FC	2
**3**	**Columbus United FC**	**3***
**West Region**
**Midwest Region**
2	Des Moines United FC	0
**3**	**Duluth FC**	**2**

Regional Finals; July 20
**1**	**FC Motown**	**5**
3	New York Shockers	0
1	West Texas FC	3
**3**	**Columbus United FC**	**4***
**1**	**El Farolito**	**4**
2	FC Arizona	1
1	Steel City FC	2
**3**	**Duluth FC**	**3***

National semifinals (Note: The remaining four teams are reseeded for the national semifinals.); July 27
**1**	**FC Motown**	**2**
3	Columbus United FC	0
**1**	**El Farolito**	**3**
3	Duluth FC	0

National Final; August 3
1	FC Motown	1
**1**	**El Farolito**	**2**

Bold = winner
* = after extra time, ( ) = penalty shootout score, FF = forfeit

==== Regional Semifinals ====
July 17 South	Hickory FC	**2–3** (a.e.t.)	**Columbus United FC**	Hickory, North Carolina
6:00 PM CDT	Bustamante (yellow card) 31'; Sanguinetti 44' (yellow card) 44'; Jimenez (yellow card) 77' (goal) 81' (pen.); Renner (yellow card) 89'; Salazar (yellow card) 98'	Report	Fontenot 19'; Vital 59'; Dapaah (yellow card) 90+1'; Santana (yellow card) 98'; Garcia 107'	Stadium: Moretz Stadium; Attendance: 3,550

July 17 East	**FC Motown**	**1–0**	Virginia Dream FC	Montclair, New Jersey
6:30 PM CDT	Hagen (yellow card) 55'; Ruiz 76'		Koffi (yellow card) 22'; Rojas-Goodbold (yellow card) 74'	Stadium: MSU Soccer Park

July 17 East	West Chester United SC	**2–3**	**New York Shockers**	Chester, Pennsylvania
6:30 PM CDT	Slack 3' (yellow card) 76'; Elkahloun 44'; Mellor (yellow card) 89'		Okine 17'; Cekic (yellow card) 44'; Leon 50'; Dobruna 79'; Daly (yellow card) 89'	Stadium: Quick Stadium

July 17 Midwest	Des Moines United FC	**0–2**	**Duluth FC**	Indianola, Iowa
7:00 PM CDT	Iradukunda (yellow card) 85'; Paura (yellow card) 88' (yellow-red card) 90'		Pritchard (yellow card) 28' (goal) 68'; Sumner (yellow card) 43'; Solares (yellow card) 59'; Doyle 79'	Stadium: Indianola Football Field

July 17 South	**West Texas FC**	**4–1**	OKC 1889 FC	Midland, Texas
7:30 PM CDT	Williams 15'; Marques 56', 67'; Stevenson 74'		Langford 84'	Stadium: Astound Broadband Stadium

==== Regional Finals ====
July 20 Midwest	Steel City FC	**2–3** (a.e.t.)	**Duluth FC**	Pittsburgh, Pennsylvania
6:00 PM CDT	Sullivan 32'; Plizga (yellow card) 88'; McLoughlin (yellow card) 90'; DiMatteo (yellow card) 90'; Norris 90+3' (yellow card) 90+7'; Mertz (yellow card) 103'		Pritchard 8' (yellow card) 100'; Sumner (yellow card) 66'; Santos 83'; Doyle (red card) 90+3'; Solares (yellow card) 98'; Carli 99'	Stadium: Chatham University - Graham Field

July 20 East	**FC Motown**	**5–0**	New York Shockers	Montclair, New Jersey
6:00 PM CDT	Fala (yellow card) 44'; Perez (yellow card) 56'; Cordeiro 62'; Sow 82'; Nee 84', 88', 89'		Scarano (yellow card) 49'; Linge (yellow card) 80'	Stadium: MSU Soccer Park

July 20 South	West Texas FC	**3–4** (a.e.t.)	**Columbus United FC**	Midland, Texas
7:30 PM CDT	Marques 79'; Van Der Molen 86', 90+2' (pen.); Naidoo (yellow card); Endo (yellow card) (yellow-red card); McCormick (yellow card)		Fontenot 2'; Kawata 8'; Csato 73'; Vital (yellow card) 80'; Santana (yellow card) 90'; Muñoz 112' (yellow card) 113'; Campos (yellow card)	Stadium: Astound Broadband Stadium

July 20 West	**El Farolito**	**4–1**	FC Arizona	San Francisco, California
8:30 PM CDT	Sacre 18' (yellow card) 49'; Yabur (yellow card) 32' (goal) 70' (pen.); Sidibe (yellow card) 33'; Arriola 88', 89'		Gallegos (yellow card) 15'; Benjamin 44'; Aceves (yellow card) 58' (yellow-red card) 67'; Murillo (yellow card) 67'; Alharthy (yellow card) 77'	Stadium: Kezar Stadium

==== National Semifinals ====
July 27	**FC Motown**	**2–0**	Columbus United FC	Madison, New Jersey
6:00 PM CDT	Nee 5'; Youssoufi 45' (yellow card) 58'		Kanagwa (yellow card) 22'; Tucker (yellow card) 60'	Stadium: Drew University-Ranger Stadium; Attendance: 500

July 27	**El Farolito**	**3–0**	Duluth FC	San Francisco, California
8:30 PM CDT	Valdivia 9'; Arias 32', 90+1'; Mosquera (yellow card) 56'		Pritchard (yellow card) 35'	Stadium: Kezar Stadium

==== 2024 NPSL National Championship Game ====
August 3
20:10

FC Motown	1–2	El Farolito
Cordeiro (yellow card) 36'; Perez (yellow card) 39'; Bermudez (yellow card) 41' (goal) 56'; Arronis (yellow card) 90'		Valdivia (yellow card) 39' (yellow-red card) 68'; Martinez (yellow card) 45+8'; Yabur (yellow card) 45+1' (goal) 54' (pen.); Arias 62'; Lizarralde (yellow card) 90+4'

Drew University-Ranger Stadium, Madison, New Jersey
Attendance: 1,300

Championship MVP: Erik Arias (ELF)

== Awards ==
=== Individual awards ===
Award	Winner	Team	Ref.
Golden Ball	(Canada) Olivier Correa	West Texas FC	
Golden Boot	(United States) Angel Chavez	Virginia Dream FC	
Golden Boot	(United States) Philip Caputo	Joy St. Louis Park	
Golden Glove	(Spain) Vincent Sanchis	Dakota Fusion FC	
Young (U20) Player of the Year	(United States) Sam Sarver	Akron City FC	
Coach of the Year	(Scotland) Colin Herriot	Annapolis Blues FC	

Conference MVP
Conference	Player	Team
Gateway Conference	(Chile) Francesco Esteban	Kansas City Sol
Golden Gate Conference	(United States) Ian Reis	Napa Valley 1839 FC
Great Lakes Conference	(United States) Sam Sarver	Akron City FC
Gulf Coast Sunshine Conference	(Denmark) Oliver Moller-Jensen	Jacksonville Armada FC U-23
Heartland Conference	(Venezuela) Miguel Celis	Arkansas Wolves SC
Keystone East Conference	(Haiti) Maudwindo Germain	FC Motown
Keystone West Conference	(United States) Tanner Brentlinger	West Chester United SC
Lone Star Conference	(Canada) Olivier Correa	West Texas FC
Mid-Atlantic Conference	(United States) Angel Chavez	Virginia Dream FC
North Conference	(United States) Philip Caputo	Joy St. Louis Park
North Atlantic Conference	(Italy) Filippo Bellu	New York Shockers
Southeast Conference	(United States) Elie Bokota	Appalachian FC
Southwest Conference	(South Africa) Marco Afonso	FC Arizona
