= West Texas FC =

Soccer club based in Midland, Texas

- Full name: West Texas Football Club
- Founded: 2008 (18 years ago)
- Stadium: Astound Broadband Stadium; Midland, Texas
- Owner(s): Jason and Melina Cannon
- Coach: Scotty Murray
- League: USL League Two
- 2025: National Premier Soccer League; Lone Star Conference: 1st of 7; Playoffs: Conference final
- Website: westtexasfc.com
Home colors

West Texas FC is a men's soccer club based in Midland, Texas. Owned by Jason and Melina Cannon, the club competes in the Ranger Division of USL League Two, an amateur league in the United States league system. It plays its home games at Astound Broadband Stadium. West Texas FC was founded in 2009 as the "West Texas Sockers", and underwent various rebrandings as they competed in the Premier Development League (now USL League Two) and the National Premier Soccer League, and expanded their market to nearby Odessa, Texas. It adopted its current name after a hiatus and buyout in 2022.

== History ==
The team joined the USL as an expansion team in 2009, The team's ownership group included Miles Prentice and Bob Richmond, who also owned the Midland RockHounds. The team opened its inaugural season on April 10, 2009 with a 1–0 win over the Arizona Sahuaros in an exhibition match at Grande Stadium. The Sockers played their first official game on May 2, 2009, a 2–0 loss to the El Paso Patriots. The team's average attendance was 2,782 in the 2009 season, and 2,501 in 2010. (Note: Attendance stats are calculated by averaging each team's self-reported home attendances from the historical match archive.)

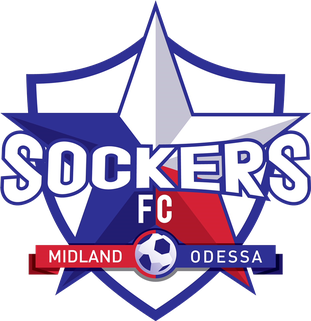
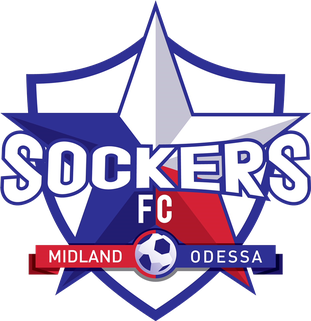
The team's logos from 2016–2017 (left) and 2018–2021 (right)

Originally known as the "West Texas Sockers", they were renamed the "Odessa/Midland Sockers" on February 20, 2013. The club was again renamed, this time to "Midland-Odessa FC", upon their entry into NPSL on December 13, 2016. The team adopted "Midland-Odessa Sockers FC" as its branding for the 2018 NPSL season. The team went on hiatus for the 2022 NPSL season. In December 2022, it was announced that the team had been purchased from the Midland RockHounds by local real estate investors Jason and Melina Cannon. The team returned in 2023 as "West Texas FC". In January 2023, Victor Domingues was named as the rebranded club's first head coach.

== Team ==
=== Notable former players ===
This list of notable former players comprises players who went on to play professional soccer after playing for the team in the Premier Development League, or those who previously played professionally before joining the team.

- (England) Ben Everson
- (Mexico) Alonso Jiménez
- (United States) James Stevens
- (England) Andrew Fox
- (United States) Walker Hume
- (United States) Tucker Hume

=== Head coaches ===
- (Mexico) Jesus Enriquez (2009–2010)
- (United States) Warren Cottle (2010–2013)
- (United States) Matt Barnes (2014–2017)
- (Colombia) Luis Rincon (2018)
- (Scotland) Johnny Clifford (2019)
- (United States) Dave Jacobs (2020–2021)
- (Brazil) Victor Domingues (2023)
- (England) David Ormiston (2024)
- (Australia) Scotty Murray (2025)

== Seasons ==
List of West Texas FC seasons
Season	League	Pld	W	D	L	GF	GA	GD	Pos	Playoffs	USOC	Ref
2009	PDL	16	8	3	5	25	19	+6	2nd of 7	Divisional finals	DNQ	
2010	PDL	16	6	3	7	20	24	–4	4th of 6	DNQ	DNQ	
2011	PDL	16	5	0	11	20	35	–15	5th of 6	DNQ	DNQ	
2012	PDL	16	3	6	7	18	30	–12	6th of 6	DNQ	DNQ	
2013	PDL	14	3	3	8	27	41	–14	4th of 6	DNQ	DNQ	
2014	PDL	14	7	3	4	26	19	+7	3rd of 5	DNQ	DNQ	
2015	PDL	14	6	3	5	24	14	+10	2nd of 4	Conference semi-finals	2R	
2016	PDL	14	8	3	3	20	14	+6	2nd of 5	National semi-finals	DNQ	
2017	NPSL	10	7	0	3	24	12	+12	3rd of 6	Runners-up	DNQ	
2018	NPSL	10	7	1	2	30	8	+22	2nd of 9	Conference semi-finals	2R	
2019	NPSL	12	9	2	1	27	7	+20	1st of 7	Conference final	1R	
2020	NPSL	Season suspended									W/D	
2021	NPSL	10	5	3	2	17	11	+6	3rd of 8	Conference semi-finals	DNQ	
2022	NPSL	Did not play										
2023	NPSL	11	7	1	3	22	14	+8	3rd of 11	Conference semi-finals	DNQ	
2024	NPSL	10	7	1	2	33	16	+17	1st of 8	Regional final	DNQ	
2025	NPSL	10	7	1	2	29	15	14	1st of 7	Conference final	DNQ	
2026	USL2	10	5	3	4	26	19	18	4th of 7	did not qualify	DNQ	

== Honors ==
- National Premier Soccer League
  - Runners-up (1): 2017

== Average attendance ==
Attendance stats are calculated by averaging each team's self-reported home attendances from the historical match archive at https://web.archive.org/web/20100105175057/http://www.uslsoccer.com/history/index_E.html.

- 2009: 2,782 (2nd in PDL)
- 2010: 2,501 (2nd in PDL)
- 2011: 1,355 (6th in PDL)
- 2012: 1,275 (6th in PDL)
- 2013: 966 (12th in PDL)
- 2014: 1,120 (10th in PDL)
- 2015: 799 (7th in PDL)
