= Morteza Ebrahimi =

Iranian footballer and coach

Personal information
- Full name: Morteza Ebrahimi
- Date of birth: 6 March 1982 (age 44)
- Place of birth: Rasht, Iran
- Position: Defender

Youth career
- Esteghlal Rasht

Senior career*
Years	Team	Apps	(Gls)
- Esteghlal Rasht
2002–2005	Pegah Gilan	?	(1)
2005–2007	Esteghlal	22	(0)
2007–2009	Mes Kerman	62	(8)
2009–2012	Saipa	78	(4)
2012–2014	Damash Gilan	26	(0)

Managerial career
- 2023–: Charlottetowne Hops FC
- * Club domestic league appearances and goals as of 19 October 2012 (UTC) ‡ National team caps and goals as of 12 May 2010

67

Morteza Ebrahimi (born March 6, 1982) is a retired Iranian footballer who played in the IPL. He currently works as a youth coach for Charlotte Soccer Academy and is the head coach for National Premier Soccer League club Charlottetowne Hops FC.

== Club career ==
He started his career with Esteghlal Rasht youth team in 1998. In 2005, he joined Esteghlal F.C. which became IPL Champions in the 2005–06 season.

=== Club career statistics ===
As of 26 September 2013

Club performance			League	
Season	Club	League	Apps	Goals
Iran			League	
2004–05	Pegah	Pro League	27	1
2005–06	Esteghlal	Pro League	11	0
2006–07	Esteghlal	Pro League	11	0
2007–08	Mes	Pro League	29	2
2008–09	Mes	Pro League	33	6
2009–10	Saipa	Pro League	31	3
2010–11	Saipa	Pro League	21	1
2011–12	Saipa	Pro League	26	0
2012–13	Damash	Pro League	20	0
2013–14	Damash	Pro League	6	0
Career total			188	13

== Coaching ==
In February 2023, Ebrahimi was named head coach of National Premier Soccer League expansion club Charlottetown Hops FC.

== Honours ==
- Iran Pro League
  - Winner: 1
    - 2005–06 with Esteghlal
