= Alonso Jiménez =

Mexican footballer (born 1987)

Personal information
- Full name: Alonso Jiménez Prieto
- Date of birth: 19 September 1987 (age 39)
- Place of birth: Ciudad Juárez, Mexico
- Height: 1.86 m (6 ft 1 in)
- Position: Goalkeeper

Team information
- Current team: Charlotte Eagles
- Number: 26

Youth career
- 2007–2008: Indios

Senior career*
Years	Team	Apps	(Gls)
2008–2012	Indios	1	(0)
2008–2009	→ Indios Chihuahua (loan)	21	(0)
2009–2010	→ Tijuana (loan)	1	(0)
2012	West Texas Sockers	14	(0)
2013–2015	Charlotte Eagles	1	(0)
- * Club domestic league appearances and goals as of July 31, 2013

Alonso Jiménez Prieto (born September 19, 1987) is a Mexican footballer who plays for Charlotte Eagles in the USL Pro.

== Career ==
Jimenez played with Mexican club Indios from 2007 until when they folded in 2011. He later trialled with USL PDL club West Texas Sockers and signed with them on April 27, 2012.

Jimenez joined USL Pro club Charlotte Eagles in April 2013.
