= Dustin Ware =

American basketball player (born 1990)

College Park Skyhawks
- Position: Assistant coach
- League: NBA G League

Personal information
- Born: April 12, 1990 (age 36) Atlanta, Georgia
- Listed height: 5 ft 11 in (1.80 m)
- Listed weight: 172 lb (78 kg)

Career information
- High school: North Cobb Christian School (Kennesaw, Georgia)
- College: Georgia (2008–2012)
- NBA draft: 2012: undrafted
- Playing career: 2012–2023

Career history

Playing
- 2012: Cibona
- 2013–2014: ratiopharm Ulm
- 2013–2014: →Weißenhorn Youngstars
- 2014–2015: Jászberényi KSE
- 2015–2017: JA Vichy-Clermont
- 2017: Boulazac Dordogne
- 2017: Lukoil Academic
- 2017–2018: Kolossos Rodou
- 2018–2019: Zalakerámia ZTE
- 2019–2020: Wilki Morskie Szczecin
- 2020–2021: Start Lublin
- 2021–2022: MZT Skopje
- 2022: Champagne Châlons-Reims
- 2022: Trotamundos B.B.C.
- 2022: Pieno žvaigždės
- 2022–2023: MZT Skopje

Coaching
- 2024–2025: Pace Academy (assistant)
- 2025–present: College Park Skyhawks (assistant)

Career highlights
- Croatian League champion (2012); Macedonian League champion (2023); Macedonian Cup winner (2023)

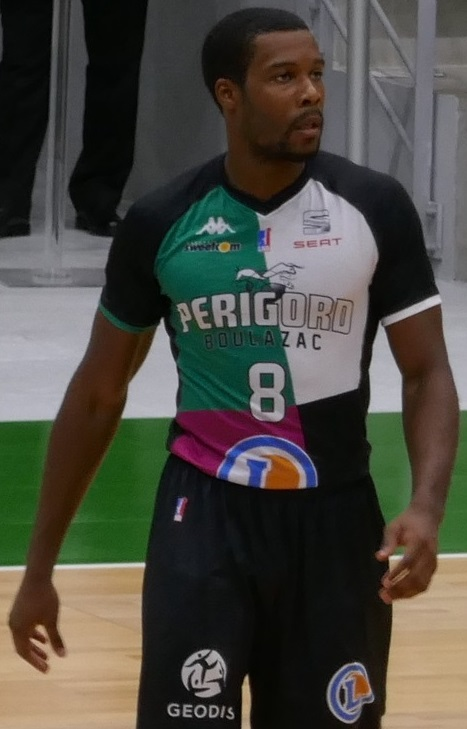
Dustin Ware

Dustin Benison Ware (born April 12, 1990) is an American former professional basketball player and current assistant coach for the College Park Skyhawks of the NBA G League. After four years at Georgia, Ware entered the 2012 NBA draft but was not selected in the draft's two rounds.

== High school career ==
Ware played high school basketball at North Cobb Christian School, in Kennesaw, Georgia.

== College career ==
Ware chose to play college basketball at Georgia after finishing high school at North Cobb Christian School. At Georgia, during his stay at the university, he was one of the best deep shooters on the team, and along with his teammate Trey Thompkins, he was a reliable defender. As a senior, Ware averaged 8.1 points, 2.3 assists and 2.2 rebounds per game.

== Professional career ==
After going undrafted in the 2012 NBA draft, Ware started his professional career with Cibona of the Croatian League. He left the club after only one match.

In 2013, Ware joined Weißenhorn Youngstars, the development team of the Basketball Bundesliga side Ratiopharm Ulm, and spent almost the whole season with Youngstarson loan. On August, he joined Jászberényi KSE of the Nemzeti Bajnokság I/A, the highest professional league in Hungary. After one year with the club, Ware joined JA Vichy-Clermont, where he spent two seasons, being one of the leaders of the club.

On July 2, 2017, Ware signed with Boulazac Dordogne of the Pro A. On October he left the club and joined Lukoil Academic of the NBL. On December, he left Lukoil in order to join Kolossos Rodou of the Greek Basket League, replacing Malcolm Griffin on the team's squad.

On July 5, 2018, Ware joined Zalakerámia ZTE of the Hungarian League.

Ware joined Wilki Morskie Szczecin during the 2019–20 season and averaged 13.4 points and 5.6 assists per game. He re-signed with the team on November 7, 2020. In 2021, Ware signed with MZT Skopje and averaged 9.7 points, 6.4 assists, and 2.8 rebounds per game. On January 20, 2022, he signed with Champagne Châlons-Reims of the LNB Pro A.

== Coaching career ==
On October 23, 2025, Ware was named as an assistant coach for the College Park Skyhawks of the NBA G League.
