= Tommy Križanović =

Croatian footballer and coach

Personal information
- Full name: Tomislav Križanović
- Date of birth: November 20, 1984 (age 41)
- Place of birth: Slavonski Brod, Croatia
- Height: 1.72 m (5 ft 8 in)
- Position: Forward

Team information
- Current team: Jacksonville Armada U-23 (head coach)

College career
Years	Team	Apps	(Gls)
2003–2006	Jacksonville Dolphins		

Senior career*
Years	Team	Apps	(Gls)
2007	FC Dallas	0	(0)
2008–2009	Offenburger FV	3	(0)
2011–2013	Jacksonville United		
2015–2016	Jacksonville Armada	14	(1)

Managerial career
- 2016–2020: Jacksonville Armada U-23 (assistant)
- 2021–: Jacksonville Armada U-23
- * Club domestic league appearances and goals

Tomislav "Tommy" Križanović (born November 20, 1984) is a Croatian football coach and former player. He is currently the head coach of Jacksonville Armada U-23.

== Playing career ==
Križanović played four years of college soccer at Jacksonville University between 2003 and 2006. He was later drafted in the fourth round (43rd overall) of the 2007 MLS SuperDraft by FC Dallas, where he spent the 2007 season. Križanović moved to Germany in 2008, where he spent time with Offenburger FV.

He returned to Florida to coach youth soccer and spent time with NPSL side Jacksonville United between 2011 and 2013. He signed with North American Soccer League's Jacksonville Armada FC in January 2015.

Križanović was released by Jacksonville on 4 February 2016.

== Coaching career ==
After several seasons as an assistant coach, Križanović was named head coach of National Premier Soccer League side Jacksonville Armada U-23.
