= Daniel Buitrago =

Colombian footballer (born 1991)

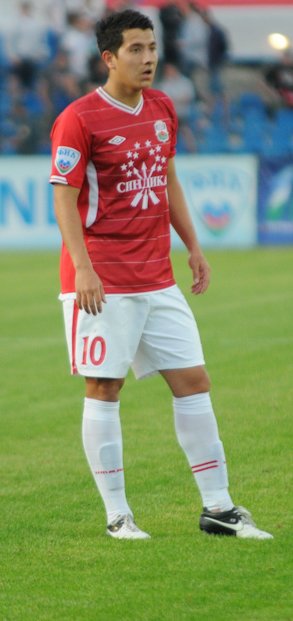

Personal information
- Full name: Daniel Esteban Buitrago Tamayo
- Date of birth: February 27, 1991 (age 35)
- Place of birth: Medellín, Colombia
- Height: 1.77 m (5 ft 10 in)
- Position: Forward

Youth career
- Escuela Gallegol

Senior career*
| Years | Team | Apps | (Gls) |
| 2011–2012 | Spartaks Jūrmala | 14 | (12) |
| 2012 | → Spartak Nalchik (loan) | 8 | (1) |
| 2012–2013 | Spartak Nalchik | 32 | (3) |
| 2014 | Llaneros | 28 | (10) |
| 2015–2016 | Cortuluá | 69 | (9) |
| 2016–2017 | Santa Fe | 14 | (0) |
| 2018 | Universidad Católica | 20 | (1) |
| 2018–2019 | America de Cali | 10 | (0) |
| 2019 | Atlético Venezuela | 5 | (1) |
| 2020 | Sonsonate | 12 | (0) |

International career
| | Colombia U-20 | 2 | (0) |
- * Club domestic league appearances and goals

Daniel Esteban Buitrago Tamayo (born February 27, 1991), or simply Daniel Buitrago, is a Colombian former professional football player.

He made his Russian Premier League debut for PFC Spartak Nalchik on 18 March 2012 in a game against FC Krylia Sovetov Samara.
