= Kostyantyn Domaratskyi =

Ukrainian footballer

Kostiantyn Domaratskyi
Personal information
- Full name: Kostiantyn Olehovych Domaratskyi
- Date of birth: 27 June 2000 (age 26)
- Place of birth: Lviv, Ukraine
- Height: 1.74 m (5 ft 8 1/2 in)
- Position: Midfielder

Team information
- Current team: SC Dnipro-1
- Number: 54

Youth career
- 2012–2017: Karpaty Lviv
- 2017–2018: Lviv

Senior career*
Years	Team	Apps	(Gls)
2018–2019	Chornomorets Odesa	0	(0)
2019–	SC Dnipro-1	2	(0)
- * Club domestic league appearances and goals as of 10 May 2021

Kostiantyn Domaratskyi (Ukrainian: Костянтин Олегович Домарацький; born 27 June 2000) is a professional Ukrainian football midfielder.

== Career ==
Domaratskyi is a product of the Karpaty Lviv youth sportive school and in August 2019 he signed a contract with Ukrainian side SC Dnipro-1 and played for its in the Ukrainian Premier League Reserves and Under 19 Championship.

In December 2020 he was promoted to the main squad to play in the Ukrainian Premier League. Domaratskyi made his debut in the Ukrainian Premier League for SC Dnipro-1 as a second-half substituted player on 6 December 2020, playing in a losing away match against FC Zorya Luhansk.
