= Anders Bordoy =

American soccer player

Personal information
- Full name: Anders Bordoy
- Date of birth: December 16, 2004 (age 21)
- Place of birth: Kittanning, Pennsylvania, United States
- Height: 6 ft 2 in (1.88 m)
- Position: Midfielder

Team information
- Current team: Steel City FC

Youth career
- 2014–2023: Pittsburgh Riverhounds Youth Academy
- 2023–: Memphis Tigers

Senior career*
| Years | Team | Apps | (Gls) |
| 2023 | Pittsburgh Riverhounds | 1 | (0) |
| 2024- | Steel City FC | | |
- * Club domestic league appearances and goals

Anders Bordoy (born December 16, 2004) is an American soccer player who plays as a midfielder for the National Premier Soccer League club, Steel City FC. Bordoy signed his first professional contract with the Riverhounds in 2023, having been in their academy since 2014. After the Riverhounds' 2023 Season ended, Bordoy returned to youth soccer, joining the Memphis Tigers.

== Career ==
=== Academy and amateur ===
Bordoy joined the Riverhounds academy in 2014. Bordoy was pulled away by the coach of the academy team and was notified that he would play for the senior team.

After the end of the season with the Riverhounds, Bordoy returned to youth soccer, joining the Memphis Tigers. After his first couple of games, he was voted "Rookie of the Week," after getting three assists in two games. In his first season, he played 19 games, starting 11 of them.

=== Professional ===
==== Pittsburgh Riverhounds ====
Bordoy made his debut for the Riverhounds senior team as a late substitution in the 2–0 win over the Maryland Bobcats in the U.S. Open Cup. Bordoy took a shot which was saved by the keeper, though it rebounded to Burke Fahling who was able to give the Hounds a 2–0 lead. Following his appearance in the Open Cup, Bordoy appeared on the bench with the Hounds for a while after. He then returned to the academy, though he was still an option for Bob Lilley to choose.

==== Steel City FC ====
Staying in Pittsburgh, Bordoy joined Steel City FC for the Summer 2024 season. He scored an important equalizer against Niagara 1812 FC. He scored once again in the same game as they were able to get a 5–1 win in the second half. He scored again against the Southern Indiana Guardians a few weeks later. After returning to college in late 2024, he resigned with Steel City ahead of their 2025 season, this time in USL League Two.
