= Jacob Schulman =

Dutch numismatist (1906–1991)

Jacques Schulman
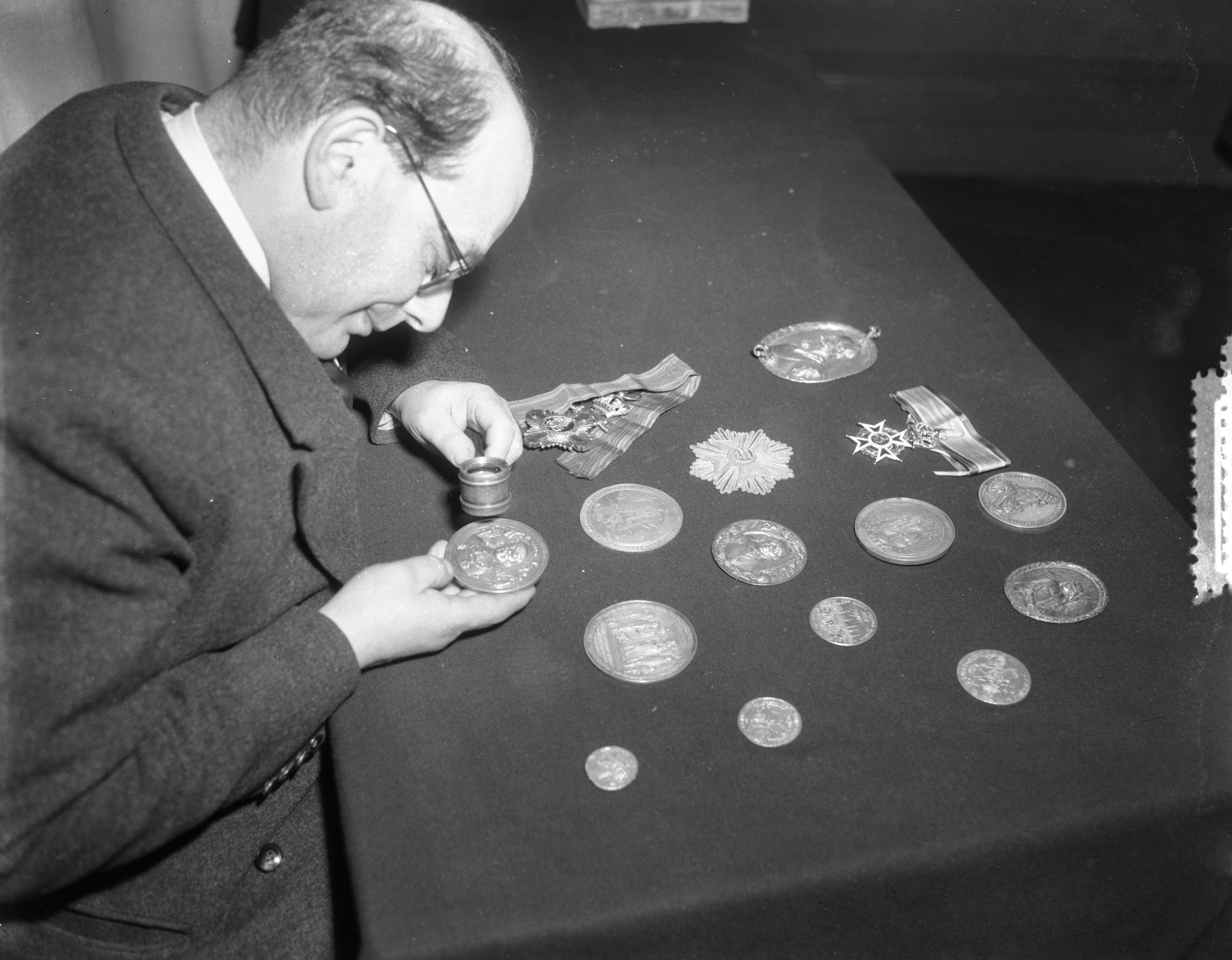
- Schulman examining medals and decorations before an auction at the Keizersgracht premises in Amsterdam, December 1953
- Born: 1906
- Died: 1991 (aged 84–85)
- Occupations: Numismatist, auctioneer, author
- Known for: Handboek van de Nederlandse munten, IAPN president
- Awards: Knight of the Order of Orange-Nassau

Jacques Schulman (1906–1991) was a Dutch numismatist who served as president of the International Association of Professional Numismatists (IAPN) from 1953 to 1961. His Handboek van de Nederlandse munten introduced a classification system for Dutch coinage, known as the Schulman number, that remains in international use.

== Background ==
Schulman came from a family of numismatists. His grandfather Jacob Schulman (1849–1914) established a coin trading business in Amersfoort in 1880, holding his first public auction in 1889. The firm moved to the Keizersgracht in Amsterdam in 1902 and later relocated to the Jan Luijkenstraat, where it remains active.

Jacques studied at the Cabinet des Médailles, the École du Louvre, the Sorbonne, and the British Museum. During World War II, his uncle Maurits Schulman was deported and killed at Sobibór extermination camp. Jacques continued operating the Amsterdam business throughout the occupation, and expanded it after the war.

== Career and recognition ==
Schulman helped establish the IAPN in 1951 and served as its president from 1953 to 1961, followed by a term as treasurer. He co-founded the first Dutch numismatic circle in Amsterdam (1947) and the journal De Geuzenpenning.

In February 1954 Schulman travelled to Cairo for The Palace Collections of Egypt, the Sotheby's sale of the coin collection of the deposed Egyptian king Farouk at the Koubbeh Palace. Before his departure Algemeen Handelsblad reported that he was going with a series of buying commissions and that Farouk had earlier been a client of his firm. At the sale he said he was chiefly interested in buying back Dutch coins that he had sold to Farouk while the collection was being assembled. His New York cousin Hans M. F. Schulman also attended and paid the second-highest price of the opening day, £200 for a twenty-dollar gold piece.

In 1976, the Royal Dutch Numismatic Society (Koninklijk Nederlands Genootschap voor Munt- en Penningkunde) elected him an honorary member. He received the Knight of Orange-Nassau for his contributions to numismatics as a scholarly field.

== Handboek van de Nederlandse munten ==
During the German occupation, Schulman began compiling data on Dutch coinage, drawing on records his family had kept since the late nineteenth century. He published the first edition of his Handboek van de Nederlandse munten 1795–1945 in 1946. The catalogue went through five editions, with the final one covering coins through 1975.

The Handboek assigned each Dutch coin type a reference number. These Schulman numbers became the standard citation method for post-1795 Dutch numismatics and continue to appear in auction catalogues and scholarly literature worldwide.

== Family ==
Jacques Schulman's cousin Hans M.F. Schulman (1913–1990) emigrated to New York in 1938, where he became a founding member of both the Professional Numismatists Guild and the IAPN. Jacques's son Laurens Schulman (born 1948) continues in the field, operating Laurens Schulman BV in Harderwijk.

== See also ==
- Numismatics
- International Association of Professional Numismatists
