= Jacksonville Armada U-23 =

- Full name: Jacksonville Armada U-23
- Founded: 2016; 10 years ago
- Ground: Nathaniel Glover Community Field & Stadium
- Capacity: 5,000
- Owner: Robert Palmer
- Head Coach: Tommy Križanović
- League: National Premier Soccer League
Home colors

Jacksonville Armada U-23 are an American soccer team based in Jacksonville, Florida. They play in the National Premier Soccer League (NPSL), the fourth tier of the American soccer pyramid, and are part of the development system of the Jacksonville Armada FC of the North American Soccer League (NASL). They started play in 2016, replacing Jacksonville United FC in the NPSL. The team currently plays its home games at Nathaniel Glover Community Field & Stadium on the campus of Edward Waters University.

As Jacksonville United FC, the club won the NPSL Championship in its first year in the 2011 season.

== History ==
Jacksonville United FC was founded in 2010 in Jacksonville, Florida, and began play in the 2011 season of the National Premier Soccer League (NPSL), considered at the fourth tier of the American soccer pyramid. The team was owned by Barry Dixon. While the team started their first season with four straight losses, they finished the season on an 8-game winning streak through the playoffs, finally defeating the Hollywood United Hitmen to claim the NPSL Championship with a 3–2 victory on July 30, 2011, in Madison, Alabama. Tommy Krizanovic was named Jacksonville's MVP, scoring a hat-trick in the final.

In 2016, Jacksonville Armada FC of the North American Soccer League (NASL) announced they would establish an under 23 team to compete in the NPSL as part of the club's development system. Jacksonville Armada U-23 replaced Jacksonville United in the league for the 2016 NPSL season. The Armada retained head coach Pat Cannon.

Following the 2017 NASL season, the league was denied Division II sanctioning by the United States Soccer Federation and canceled its 2018 season while legal proceedings played out. During this time, many NASL teams fielded teams in the NPSL including the Jacksonville Armada. The main team took part in league play with a mix professional and amateur players while the U-23 side went on hiatus for the season.

For the 2019 NPSL season Armada U-23 returned to the league and announced Aaron Pitchkolan as the new head coach. The team reached the playoffs for the first time since 2014 but fell in the conference semifinals to eventual national champions Miami FC.

In late 2019 the club announced it would be a founding member of the NPSL's new Gulf Coast Conference, joining teams from the Gulf Coast Premier League and a returning New Orleans Jesters for the 2020 season.

On April 5, former Armada player Tommy Križanović returned to the organization as the team's third-ever head coach.

== Coaching staff ==
=== Current technical staff ===
Role	Name
Head coach	(Croatia) Tommy Križanović
Assistant coach	(England) Jack Burns
Manager	Richard Santos

=== Head coaches ===
Name	Nationality	Tenure
Pat Cannon	United States	2011–17
Aaron Pitchkolan	United States	2019
Pat Cannon	United States	2020
Tommy Križanović	Croatia	2021-

== Results ==
=== Year-by-year ===
Season	League	Div.	Pos.	Pl.	W	D	L	GF	GA	GD	Pts.
2011	NPSL	Southeast	1st	10	6	0	4	16	12	+4	18
2012	NPSL	South-Southeast-East	4th	10	3	2	5	21	23	-2	11
2013	NPSL	Sunshine	1st	8	6	2	0	20	7	+13	20
2014	NPSL	Sunshine	2nd	10	6	2	2	14	7	+7	20
2015	NPSL	Sunshine	4th	10	3	5	2	10	14	-4	11
2016	NPSL	Sunshine	2nd	10	5	2	3	26	13	+13	18
2017	NPSL	Sunshine	3rd	12	6	4	2	31	17	+14	20
2018	On Hiatus										
2019	NPSL	Sunshine	4th	10	3	6	1	13	32	-19	10
2020	Cancelled										
2021	NPSL	Gulf Coast Conference	1st	14	12	0	2	37	12	+25	36

=== Honors ===
- 2011 NPSL National Champions
- 2011 NPSL Southeast Division Champions
- 2013 NPSL Southern Region Semi-Finalist
- 2013 NPSL Sunshine Division Champions
- 2021 NPSL Gulf Coast Conference Division Champions
