= North Cobb Christian School =

Private Christian school in Kennesaw, Georgia, United States

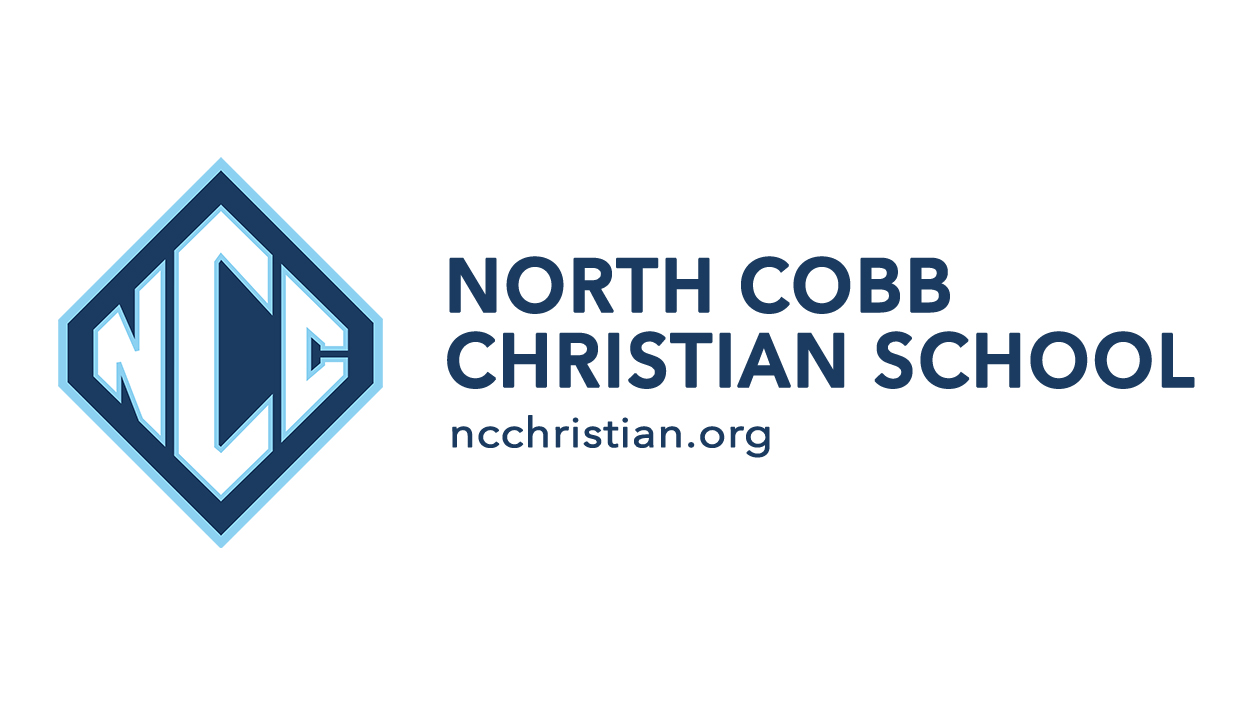

Location
- Acworth, Georgia; United States; 34°02′38″N 84°39′41″W

Information
- Type: Private, coeducational
- Motto: "Together... Cultivating Hearts. Challenging Minds. Impacting Culture."
- Established: 1983
- Headmaster: Todd Clingman
- Faculty: 180
- Enrollment: 875
- Campus: Suburban
- Colors: Carolina blue, navy blue, and white
- Mascot: Eagle
- Website: www.ncchristian.org

North Cobb Christian School is an independent, college preparatory Christian school located in Kennesaw, Georgia, United States. It enrolls children from K3 through 12th grade. The school offers a variety of honors and AP classes; clubs; and middle school, junior varsity, and varsity sports. In addition to academic requirements mandated by the school board, a minimum of 28 hours of community service is required to graduate.

== History ==
North Cobb Christian was founded in 1980 as a ministry of Grace Brethren Church on Big Shanty Road in Marietta, Georgia. The Christian School movement was underway, and it was proposed that the church start a school. Pastor Dean Fetterhoff asked Rob Smith to chair a board to investigate the possibility. Early board members included Rob Smith, Betty Byers, and Harris Kruse.

Grace Christian School started in the fall of 1980, and was run by the church for three years. Each year, more non-church members sent their children to the growing school, so in 1983 it was decided that the school would be better served by breaking away from Grace Brethren Church. This was done in the fall of 1983, and the school changed its name to North Cobb Christian School. It stayed on the campus of Grace Brethren Church, where 36 children were enrolled in kindergarten through third grade.

Two years later land was purchased and the school moved to its current location. The founders had not anticipated that the school would grow so quickly, so over the next five years, a grade was added each year until the school reached eighth grade.

The high school was not formed until about the mid-1990s, when the campus was much expanded. New buildings were constructed, including a gymnasium, media center, more classrooms, and computer labs. High school classes began in the fall of 1998. In 2013 a new campus was introduced, with a natatorium, a stadium plaza, tennis courts, and new buildings for every major division of the NCCS curriculum (high school, middle school, lower school, and preschool).

In 2025, the school made the news after a student was expelled shortly prior to graduation for bringing a transgender boy to prom with her.

== Academics ==
North Cobb Christian has a Bible-based curriculum that includes many honors and AP classes. NCCS offers all students the Directed Studies program. This consists of educational therapy, tutoring, and mentoring. Educational therapy is available for students with a diagnosed processing weakness. Tutoring is available for students who have gaps in achievement in subjects such as reading, math and language arts. Mentoring is available for secondary students who struggle to keep pace with the program and need additional help to organize and manage their school life.

== Sport ==
North Cobb Christian School is home to 13 varsity teams, several junior varsity teams, and 16 middle school teams. Many teams serve the community by working in community service projects around town throughout the year. The sports played from middle school to high school include basketball, football, baseball, cheerleading, golf, tennis, cross country, soccer, swimming, track, volleyball, and softball.

Boys' basketball

- NACA National Champions: 2008
- State Champions: 2005, 2007, 2008

Volleyball

- State Champions: 2000, 2001, 2002, 2003

Baseball

- NACA National Champions: 2008
- State Champions: 2002, 2006

Boys' soccer

- State Champions: 2008

Golf

- GHSA A Private State Champions: 2015

Individual State Champions

Track and field

- Morgan Woodward: 2011, long jump
- Sam Shaylor: 2016, 3200

Golf

- Robert Howard: 2017

== Alumni ==
- Dustin Ware, professional basketball player
