= 2025 U.S. Open Cup qualification =

2025 Lamar Hunt U.S. Open Cup qualification
Tournament details
- Country: United States
- Dates: October 5 – December 8, 2024
- Teams: 114
- Qualified: (Massachusetts) CD Faialense (BSSL); (Texas) Foro SC (UPSL); (Florida) Harbor City FC (UPSL); (Colorado) Harpos FC (CPL); (California) International San Francisco (SFSFL); (California) Laguna United FC (UPSL); (Florida) Miami United FC (UPSL); New Jersey Alliance FC (UPSL); (New York (state)) NY Renegades FC (UPSL); Southern Indiana FC (UPSL); (Oklahoma) Tulsa Athletic (UPSL); Virginia Dream FC (VSSL); (Pennsylvania) West Chester United SC (USLPA); (Washington (state)) Washington Athletic Club (SRATS)

Tournament statistics
- Matches played: 97
- Goals scored: 423 (4.36 per match)
- All statistics correct as of 14:09, December 9, 2024 (UTC).

The 2025 Lamar Hunt U.S. Open Cup qualification served as local qualification for the 110th edition of the oldest soccer tournament in the United States. The tournament proper featured both professional and amateur teams in the United States soccer league system.

Qualification for the 2025 tournament included local qualifying matches contested by 114 amateur teams, fighting for 14 local qualifying slots, and took place in 2024. One team also qualified by winning the 2024 National Amateur Cup and one team qualified by winning the 2024 United Premier Soccer League Spring Championships.

== Qualification procedure ==
Clubs based in the United States that play in a league that is an organization member of U.S. Soccer are generally eligible to compete for the U.S. Open Cup, so long as their league includes at least four teams and has a schedule of at least 10 matches for each club. To be eligible, teams must be members in good standing of their leagues on December 31, 2023, and remain so through the 2024 final. Any team that started its first season of competition in an existing league must have started its new league's schedule no later 30 days prior to the Open Division Entry Deadline.

Starting in 2019, the winner of the previous year's National Amateur Cup automatically qualifies for the U.S. Open Cup. The cup winner enters the tournament proper in the first round with the other local qualifiers. Beginning in 2024, the United Premier Soccer League Spring Champion also earned a direct entry into the first round proper of the tournament. These two teams along with the 14 local qualifiers account for 16 of the 32 amateur teams that qualify for the tournament proper in 2025. The other 16 teams come from the National Premier Soccer League and USL League Two and qualify through national league pathways, which use previous summer season standings to determine who qualifies for the slots.

== Amateur qualification ==
=== National Amateur Cup ===
New York Pancyprian-Freedoms defeated FC Milwaukee Torrent 6–0, to win the 2024 National Amateur Cup and qualify for the 2025 U.S. Open Cup.

=== United Premier Soccer League Spring Champions ===
Soda City FC defeated Inland Empire FC 3–2, to win the 2024 UPSL Spring Championships and earning a direct qualification into the 2025 U.S. Open Cup.

=== Local qualifying ===
U.S. Soccer originally announced that 114 teams would participate in local qualifying. Four rounds of local qualifying matches will result in 14 clubs advancing to the tournament proper. The teams will be organized into 14 regional pools prior to the qualifying round draw

==== Schedule ====
Schedule for 2025 Lamar Hunt U.S. Open Cup Qualifying
Round	Match day	New Teams	Entrants	Teams entered to date
First Qualifying Round	October 5 & 6	16	16	16
Second Qualifying Round	October 5 & 6, October 26 & 27	92	100	108
Third Qualifying Round	October 26 & 27, November 16 & 17	6	56	114
Fourth Qualifying Round	November 16 & 17, December 7 & 8	0	28	114

==== Number of teams by state and league ====
A total of 25 states and the District of Columbia were represented by clubs in the U.S. Open Cup Qualification this year.

	States	Number	League	Teams
1	California	13	UPSL	Acoreano Sport, Bay Valley Suns Sports Club, City SC San Diego, FC Balboa, FC Folsom, Independente Los Angeles Futbol Club, Irvine FC, Laguna United FC, Napa Valley 1839 FC, Real Galt FC, San Diego Internacional, Trojans FC, Valley 559 FC
1	California	4	Southwest Premier League	Chula Vista FC, Desert FC, JASA RWC, Playmaker FC
1	California	2	San Francisco Soccer Football League	International San Francisco SC, San Francisco Vikings Soccer Club
1	California	1	NISA Nation	Modesto City Football Club
2	Florida	9	UPSL	City Soccer FC, Deportivo Lake Mary FC, Harbor City FC, Hodler Miami FC, International Soccer Association, Kissimmee Soccer Club, Miami United FC, Palm Beach Flames SC, Pinecrest Premier SC
2	Florida	6	United States Soccer League	Atletico Miami Internacional FC, FC America CFL Spurs, Inter Nona Soccer Club, Miami Soccer Academy, O'Shea's FC, River Miami FC
2	Florida	1	Florida Gold Coast League	Hurricane FC
2	Florida	1	Premier Futbol League	Red Force FC
2	Florida	1	Sunshine Conference Soccer League	Naples United U23
3	New York	5	Eastern Premier Soccer League	Central Park Rangers FC, KidSuper Samba AC, Lansdowne Yonkers, New York Greek-American, Zum Schneider FC 03
3	New York	3	UPSL	FCY New York, NY Empire FC, NY Renegades FC
3	New York	1	Long Island Soccer Football League	Leros SC
3	New York	1	NISA Nation	Roc City Boom
4	Pennsylvania	5	United Soccer League of Pennsylvania	Colonial SC, Philadelphia Ukrainians Nationals, United German Hungarians, Vereinigung Erzgebirge, West Chester United SC
4	Pennsylvania	3	Eastern Premier Soccer League	Alloy Soccer Club, Kensington Soccer Club, Vidas United FC
4	Pennsylvania	1	Greater Pittsburgh Soccer League	Pittsburgh Dynamo
5	Texas	2	UPSL	210 FC, Foro SC
5	Texas	2	Dallas Soccer Association	D'Feeters Kicks Soccer Club, StrikerZ DFW Soccer Club
5	Texas	1	Austin Men's Soccer Association	Austin Thunder
5	Texas	1	Houston Football Association	ASC New Stars
5	Texas	1	United States Soccer League	Houston Regals SCA
5	Colorado	5	Colorado Premier League	Azteca FC, Boulder United FC, Colorado Rovers, FC Denver, Harpos
5	Colorado	2	Mountain Premier League	Peak Eleven Football Club, Timbers SC
7	Illinois	2	Midwest Premier League	Chicago House AC, Edgewater Castle Football Club
7	Illinois	2	UPSL	Chicago Strikers, Wisloka Chicago
7	Illinois	1	Greater Chicago Soccer League	United SC
8	Maryland	2	EPSL	Maryland Bobcats II, Patuxent FA
8	Maryland	1	Maryland Super Soccer League	Steel Pulse
8	Maryland	1	UPSL	MSI Pro
8	Massachusetts	2	Bay State Soccer League	CD Faialense, FC Omens
8	Massachusetts	2	UPSL	Boston Street FC, Project Football
8	Virginia	2	UPSL	Alexandria Reds, VA Revolution Pro
8	Virginia	1	Eastern Premier Soccer League	NoVa FC
8	Virginia	1	Virginia Super Soccer League	Virginia Dream FC
8	Washington	2	Seattle Recreational Adult Team Soccer	Sharktopus Football Club, Washington Athletic Club
8	Washington	2	UPSL	Bellevue Athletic FC, Holac FC
12	District of Columbia	1	American Premier League	Aegean Hawks
12	District of Columbia	1	DC Premier League	Guerrilla FC
12	District of Columbia	1	UPSL	DC Hyper
12	New Jersey	2	Eastern Premier Soccer League	Oaklyn United FC, SC Vistula Garfield
12	New Jersey	1	UPSL	New Jersey Alliance
14	Indiana	2	UPSL	Southern Indiana FC, Southern Indiana Guardians FC
14	Nevada	2	NISA Nation	Las Vegas Legends, Soccer Academy Nevada
14	Oklahoma	2	UPSL	Bartlesville Buffaloes, Tulsa Athletic
17	Arizona	1	UPSL	Next Level Soccer
17	Georgia	1	UPSL	Dalton United
17	Kansas	1	The Select League	Woodland Football Club
17	Kentucky	1	UPSL	Bowling Green FC
17	New Mexico	1	UPSL	UDA Soccer
17	North Carolina	1	UPSL	Mint Hill FC
17	Ohio	1	Ohio Valley Premier League	Valhalla FC
17	Oregon	1	UPSL	Deportivo Rose City
17	South Carolina	1	UPSL	South Carolina United Heat
17	Tennessee	1	UPSL	Pre-College Development Academy

- States without a team in the Open Cup Qualification: Alabama, Alaska, Arkansas, Connecticut, Delaware, Hawaii, Idaho, Iowa, Louisiana, Maine, Michigan, Minnesota, Mississippi, Missouri, Montana, Nebraska, New Hampshire, North Dakota, Rhode Island, South Dakota, Utah, Vermont, West Virginia, Wisconsin and Wyoming.

=== Draw ===
On September 18, 2024, USSF completed the draw for the initial qualifying rounds. The 114 entrants were divided into 14 geographical groups with a goal to decrease travel. Match ups, byes and home teams in each geographical group were determined by random selection. In order to reach the 14 teams that will qualify for the tournament proper, only eight matches were planned for the first qualifying round. 92 teams received byes to the second qualifying round and six teams received byes to the third qualifying round. Seven of the qualifying groups held their second round matches on October 5 & 6 completing their qualifying tournament on November 15 & 16, while the other seven groups had first-round games on October 5 & 6, completing their qualifying tournament on December 7 & 8.

Groups
California North	California South	Colorado	DMV	East	Florida (2 qualify)	Mid Atlantic	Midwest A (0.5 qualify)
Acoreano Sport; Bay Valley Suns Sports Club; FC Folsom; International San Francisco; JASA RWC; Modesto City Football Club; Napa Valley 1839 FC; Real Galt FC; San Francisco Vikings Soccer Club; Valley 559 FC	Chula Vista FC; City SC San Diego; Desert FC; FC Balboa; Independente Los Angeles Futbol Club; Irvine FC; Laguna United FC; Playmaker FC; San Diego Internacional; Trojans FC	Azteca FC; Boulder United FC; Colorado Rovers; FC Denver; Harpos FC; Peak Eleven Football Club; Timbers SC	Aegean Hawks FC; Alexandria Reds; DC Hyper; Guerrilla FC; MSI Pro; Patuxent FA; Virginia Dream FC	Bowling Green FC; Dalton United; Mint Hill FC; Pre-College Development Academy; South Carolina United Heat; Southern Indiana FC; Southern Indiana Guardians FC; Valhalla FC	Atletico Miami Internacional FC; City Soccer FC; Deportivo Lake Mary FC; FC America CFL Spurs; Harbor City FC; Hodler Miami FC; Hurricane FC; Inter Nona Soccer Club; International Soccer Association; Kissimmee Soccer Club; Miami United FC; Miami Soccer Academy; Naples United U23; O'Shea's FC; Palm Beach Flames SC; Pinecrest Premier SC; Red Force FC; River Miami FC	Alloy Soccer Club; Maryland Bobcats II; New Jersey Alliance FC; Nova FC; Oaklyn United FC; SC Vistula Garfield; Steel Pulse FC; VA Revolution Pro	Chicago House AC; Chicago Strikers; Edgewater Castle FC; United SC; Wisloka Chicago
Midwest B (0.5 Teams qualify)	New York	Northeast A (0.5 Teams qualify)	Northeast B (0.5 Teams qualify)	Pennsylvania	Texas	West A (0.5 Teams qualify)	West B (0.5 Teams qualify)
FC Bartlesville Buffaloes; Tulsa Athletic; Woodland Football Club	Central Park Rangers FC; KidSuper Samba AC; Lansdowne Yonkers FC; Leros SC; NY Empire FC; New York Greek–American SC; NY Renegades FC; Zum Schneider FC 03	Boston Street FC; CD Faialense; FC Omens; Project Football	FCY New York; Pittsburgh Dynamo; Roc City Boom	Colonial SC; Kensington Soccer Club; Philadelphia Ukrainian Nationals; United German Hungarians; Vereinigung Erzgebirge; Vidas United FC; West Chester United SC	210 FC; ASC New Stars; Austin Thunder; D'Feeters Kicks Soccer Club; FORO SC; Houston Regals SCA; StrikerZ DFW Soccer Club	Bellevue Athletic FC; Deportivo Rose City; Holac FC; Sharktopus Football Club; Washington Athletic Club	Las Vegas Legends; Next Level Soccer; Soccer Academy Nevada; UDA Soccer

=== First Qualifying Round ===
The first qualifying round matches were held October 5 & 6. 92 clubs will get first qualifying Round Byes.

As of October 5, 2024

October 5, 2024 California South	Playmaker FC (SWPL) (California)	2–1 (a.e.t.)	(California) Independente Los Angeles Futbol Club (UPSL)	Irvine, California
1:00 pm PDT	Odeldele 44'; Aria 108'	Report	Morales 64'	Stadium: Great Park

October 5, 2024 Florida	City Soccer FC (UPSL) (Florida)	0–2	(Florida) Miami Soccer Academy (USSL)	Pembroke Pines, Florida
3:00 pm EDT		Report		Stadium: UPSL Stadium

October 5, 2024 California South	Chula Vista FC (SWPL) (California)	1–1 (a.e.t.) (3–1 SO)	(California) Desert FC (SWPL)	San Diego, California
3:00 pm PDT		Report		Stadium: O'Farrell Charter School

October 5, 2024 Midwest A	Chicago House AC (MWPL) (Illinois)	3–2 (a.e.t.)	(Illinois) Edgewater Castle FC (MWPL)	Lisle, Illinois
7:00 pm CDT	Mentasi 28', 44'; 110'	Report	26'; Dagatti 73'	Stadium: Benedictine University

October 5, 2024 California North	Acoreano Sport (UPSL) (California)	1–3	(California) Real Galt FC (UPSL)	Hilmar, California
6:30 pm PDT		Report		Stadium: Holy Rosary St. Marys Chapel

October 6, 2024 Florida	Atletico Miami Internacional FC (USSL) (Florida)	3–2	(Florida) Hodler Miami FC (UPSL)	Miami Gardens, Florida
2:00 pm EDT		Report		Stadium: Monsignor Edward Pace High School

October 6, 2024 West A	Washington Athletic Club (SRATS) (Washington (state))	4–3	(Washington (state)) Bellevue Athletic FC (UPSL)	Seattle, Washington
4:30 pm PDT		Report		Stadium: Interbay Stadium

October 6, 2024 California North	San Francisco Vikings Soccer Club (SFSFL) (California)	1–4	(California) International San Francisco (SFSFL)	San Francisco, California
6:00 pm PDT		Report		Stadium: James Lang Field

- Byes
  - California North - Bay Valley Suns Sports Club, FC Folsom, JASA RWC, Modesto City Football Club, Napa Valley 1839 FC, Valley 559 FC
  - California South - City SC San Diego, FC Balboa, Irvine FC, Laguna United FC, San Diego Internacional, Trojans FC
  - DMV - Aegean Hawks FC, Alexandria Reds, DC Hyper, Guerrilla FC, Patuxent FA, MSI Pro, Virginia Dream FC
  - East - Bowling Green FC, Dalton United, Mint Hill FC, Pre-College Development Academy, South Carolina United Heat, Southern Indiana FC, Southern Indiana Guardians FC, Valhalla FC
  - Florida - Deportivo Lake Mary FC, FC America CFL Spurs, Harbor City FC, Hurricane FC, Inter Nona Soccer Club, International Soccer Association, Kissimmee Soccer Club, Miami United FC, Naples United U23, O'Shea's FC, Palm Beach Flames SC, Pinecrest Premier SC, Red Force FC, River Miami FC
  - Mid Atlantic - Alloy Soccer Club, Maryland Bobcats II, New Jersey Alliance FC, Nova FC, Oaklyn United FC, SC Vistula Garfield, Steel Pulse FC, VA Revolution Pro
  - Midwest A - Chicago Strikers, United SC, Wisloka Chicago
  - Midwest B - FC Bartlesville Buffaloes, Tulsa Athletic, Woodland Football Club
  - New York - Central Park Rangers FC, KidSuper Samba AC, Lansdowne Yonkers FC, Leros SC, New York Greek American SC, NY Empire FC, NY Renegades FC, Zum Schneider FC 03
  - Northeast A - Boston Street FC, CD Faialense, FC Omens, Project Football
  - Northeast B - FCY New York, Pittsburgh Dynamo, Roc City Boom
  - Pennsylvania - Colonial SC, Kensington Soccer Club, Philadelphia Ukrainian Nationals, United German Hungarians, Vereinigung Erzgebirge, Vidas United FC, West Chester United SC
  - Texas - 210 FC, ASC New Stars, Austin Thunder, D'Feeters Kicks Soccer Club, Houston Regals SCA, StrikerZ DFW Soccer Club
  - West A - Deportivo Rose City, Holac FC, Sharktopus Football Club
  - West B - Las Vegas Legends FC, Next Level Soccer, Soccer Academy Nevada, UDA Soccer

=== Second Qualifying Round ===
Eight groups held their second qualifying round matches on Oct. 5 & 6, and the other eight groups held their second qualifying round matches on October 27 & 28. Six clubs received second qualifying round byes.

October 5, 2024 Northeast A	FC Omens (BSSL) (Massachusetts)	1–1 (a.e.t.) (3–4 SO)	(Massachusetts) Project Football (UPSL)	Boston, Massachusetts
1:00 pm EDT	Schoellkorp 7'	Report	St. Simon 10'	Stadium: Madison Park Technical Vocational High School

October 5, 2024 East	South Carolina United Heat (UPSL) (South Carolina)	0–1	(North Carolina) Mint Hill FC (UPSL)	Columbia, South Carolina
5:00 pm EDT		Report		Stadium: SCUFC Southeastern Freight Lines Soccer Center

October 5, 2024 Pennsylvania	Kensington Soccer Club (EPSL) (Pennsylvania)	4–3	(Pennsylvania) Vidas United FC (EPSL)	Germantown, Philadelphia
6:30 pm EDT	Gogidze 38'; 47'; 52'; 58'	Report	58'; 61'; 77'	Stadium: Germantown Supersite Turf Stadium

October 5, 2024 DMV	Patuxent FA (EPSL) (Maryland)	0–1	(Maryland) MSI Pro (UPSL)	Upper Marlboro, Maryland
7:00 pm EDT		Report		Stadium: Liberty Sports Park

October 5, 2024 Mid Atlantic	Alloy Soccer Club (EPSL) (Pennsylvania)	4–3	(New Jersey) Oaklyn United FC (EPSL)	Lancaster, Pennsylvania
7:00 pm EDT		Report		Stadium: Lancaster Bible College

October 5, 2024 Pennsylvania	West Chester United SC (USLP) (Pennsylvania)	6–0	(Pennsylvania) United German Hungarians (USLP)	Wayne, Pennsylvania
7:30 pm EDT		Report		Stadium: YSC Sports

October 5, 2024 New York	New York Greek–Americans (EPSL) (New York (state))	3–4	(New York (state)) NY Renegades FC (UPSL)	Hempstead, New York
8:00 pm EDT	Youssoufi 4', 70'; Botty 32'	Report	Romero 11', 45'; Caceres 59'; Palas 68'	Stadium: Hofstra University Soccer Stadium

October 5, 2024 New York	Lansdowne Yonkers FC (EPSL) (New York (state))	6–1	(New York (state)) KidSuper Samba AC (EPSL)	Yonkers, New York
8:00 pm EDT	Da Haw 10', 40'; Daso 25'; Kavanagh 41'; Galloway 53'; Kamara 87' (pen.)	Report	( 78' (pen.)	Stadium: Tibbetts Brook Park

October 6, 2024 Pennsylvania	Colonial SC (USLP) (Pennsylvania)	0–4	(Pennsylvania) Vereinigung Erzgebirge (USLP)	Plymouth Meeting, Pennsylvania
2:00 pm EDT		Report	Baker 6', 42'; Hoppenot 22'; Weatherspoon 38'	Stadium: Victory Field

October 6, 2024 Mid Atlantic	Steel Pulse FC (MSSL) (Maryland)	7–0	(Maryland) Maryland Bobcats II (EPSL)	Baltimore, Maryland
3:00 pm EDT		Report		Stadium: Milford Mill Academy

October 6, 2024 Northeast B	Roc City Boom (NISAN) (New York (state))	3–5	(New York (state)) FCY New York (UPSL)	Canandaigua, New York
3:00 pm EDT	Amoh 20', 75'; Ioncao	Report	Harling 22'; Ayad 30'; Shawish 46', 59' (pen.); Hernandez	Stadium: Finger Lakes Community College

October 6, 2024 Colorado	Peak Eleven Football Club (MPL) (Colorado)	1–2	(Colorado) FC Denver (CPL)	Boulder, Colorado
2:00 pm MDT		Report		Stadium: Fairview High School

October 6, 2024 East	Valhalla FC (OVPL) (Ohio)	1–3	Southern Indiana FC (UPSL)	Milford, Ohio
4:00 pm EDT	Mainsuul 64'	Report	Calderbank 36', 45+' (pen.); Peretyatko 70'	Stadium: Charity Lucas Soccer Stadium

October 6, 2024 DMV	Guerrilla FC (DCPL) (Washington, D.C.)	2–3	(Virginia) Alexandria Reds (UPSL)	Washington D.C.
5:30 pm EDT	Brock 29'; Luis 90+2'	Report	Montague 18', 40'; Hurge 53'	Stadium: The Fields at RFK

October 6, 2024 Colorado	Boulder United FC (CPL) (Colorado)	1–5	(Colorado) Azteca FC (UPSL)	Broomfield, Colorado
4:00 pm MDT	Boulezzaz	Report	Castillo, Valdez; Zidani; Hermosillo	Stadium: Broomfield Commons

October 6, 2024 Colorado	Timbers SC (MPL) (Colorado)	0–1	Colorado Rovers (CPL)	Denver, Colorado
4:00 pm MDT		Report	Ross 30'	Stadium: D'Evelyn Jr-Sr High School

October 6, 2024 East	Dalton United (OVPL) (Georgia (U.S. state))	3–0	(Tennessee) Pre-College Development Academy (UPSL)	Dalton, Georgia
6:00 pm EDT	Medina 5'; 20' (pen.); Saldana 74'	Report		Stadium: Dalton Stadium

October 6, 2024 Mid Atlantic	VA Revolution Pro (UPSL) (Virginia)	3–3 (a.e.t.) (3–0 SO)	(Virginia) NoVa FC (EPSL)	Leesburg, Virginia
7:00 pm EDT	Stone 17', 20'; Dexter 43'	Report	Cavillo 23'; Garrison 25', 84'	Stadium: RavenTek Park

October 6, 2024 New York	Zum Schneider FC 03 (EPSL) (New York (state))	2–0	(New York (state)) Central Park Rangers FC (EPSL)	New York, New York
7:00 pm EDT	Corneille 19'; Shamrov 56'	Report		Stadium: Jack McManus Field

October 6, 2024 Northeast A	Boston Street FC (UPSL) (Massachusetts)	1–4	(Massachusetts) CD Faialense (BSSL)	Revere, Massachusetts
7:00 pm EDT		Report		Stadium: Harry Della Russo Stadium

October 6, 2024 New York	Leros SC (LISFL) (New York (state))	2–1	(New York (state)) NY Empire FC (UPSL)	College Point, New York
7:45 pm EDT	Murray 43'; Argueta 66'	Report	Goal	Stadium: College Point Fields

October 6, 2024 East	Bowling Green FC (UPSL) (Kentucky)	3–0	(Indiana) Southern Indiana Guardians FC (UPSL)	Bowling Green, Kentucky
7:00 pm CDT	Aboudjo 11' (o.g.); Amisi 23'	Report		Stadium: Bowling Green Junior High School

October 6, 2024 DMV	Aegean Hawks (APL) (Washington, D.C.)	2–1	(Washington, D.C.) DC Hyper (UPSL)	McLean, Virginia
8:00 pm EDT		Report		Stadium: Langley High School

October 6, 2024 Mid Atlantic	New Jersey Alliance FC (UPSL)	2–0	(New Jersey) SC Vistula Garfield (EPSL)	Clifton, New Jersey
8:00 pm EDT		Report		Stadium: Athenia Steel Park

October 26, 2024 Florida	O'Shea's FC (USSL) (Florida)	6–2	(Florida) Atletico Miami Internacional FC (USSL)	West Palm Beach, Florida
4:00 pm EDT		Report		Stadium: Gaines Park

October 26, 2024 Midwest A	Chicago Strikers (UPSL) (Illinois)	0–2	(Illinois) Chicago House AC (MWPL)	Glen Ellyn, Illinois
6:00 pm CDT		Report		Stadium: Bjarne Ullsvik Stadium

October 26, 2024 Midwest A	United SC (GCSL) (Illinois)	2–2 (a.e.t.) (4–5 SO)	(Illinois) Wisloka Chicago (UPSL)	Chicago, Illinois
7:00 pm EDT	Murray 7'; Johnson 13'		84'; 90+5'	Stadium: Lions for Hope Sports Complex

October 26, 2024 Florida	Naples United U23 (SC) (Florida)	2–3	(Florida) Red Force FC (PF)	Naples, Florida
7:00 pm EDT	Marisi 42'	Report	Diaz 42'; Fajardo 43'; Olguin 71' (pen.)	Stadium: Paradise Coast Sports Complex

October 26, 2024 Florida	Kissimmee Soccer Club (UPSL) (Florida)	0–6	(Florida) FC America CFL Spurs (USSL)	St. Cloud, Florida
7:00 pm EDT		Report		Stadium: Saint Cloud High School

October 26, 2024 Florida	Harbor City FC (UPSL) (Florida)	4–0	(Florida) Deportivo Lake Mary FC (UPSL)	Melbourne, Florida
7:00 pm EDT		Report		Stadium: Melbourne High School

October 26, 2024 Florida	Palm Beach Flames SC (UPSL) (Florida)	2–1	(Florida) Miami Soccer Academy (USSL)	Pembroke Pines, Florida
7:45 pm EDT		Report		Stadium: UPSL Stadium

October 26, 2024 Midwest B	Tulsa Athletic (UPSL) (Oklahoma)	4–0	(Oklahoma) FC Bartlesville Buffaloes (UPSL)	Tulsa, Oklahoma
7:00 pm CDT		Report		Stadium: Athletic Community Stadium

October 26, 2024 Florida	Hurricane FC (FGCL) (Florida)	0–4	(Florida) Pinecrest Premier SC (UPSL)	Delray Beach, Florida
8:15 pm EDT		Report	Lazardi 49', 59', 90'; Calvo 85'	Stadium: Hilltopper Stadium

October 26, 2024 California South	San Diego Internacional (UPSL) (California)	2–1	(California) City SC San Diego (UPSL)	San Diego, California
6:00 pm PDT		Report		Stadium: Mission Bay High School

October 26, 2024 California North	Bay Valley Suns Sports Club (UPSL) (California)	2–1	(California) Napa Valley 1839 FC (UPSL)	Livermore, California
7:00 pm PDT		Report		Stadium: Las Positas College

October 26, 2024 California South	Irvine FC (UPSL) (California)	4–0	(California) Playmaker FC (SWPL)	Irvine, California
7:00 pm PDT		Report		Stadium: Orange County Great Park (Field 12)

October 26, 2024 California South	Laguna United FC (UPSL) (California)	14–0	(California) Trojans FC (UPSL)	Laguna Niguel, California
7:00 pm PDT		Report		Stadium: La Paz Sports Park

October 26, 2024 West A	Sharktopus Football Club (SRATS) (Washington (state))	4–5 (a.e.t.)	(Oregon) Deportivo Rose City (UPSL)	Seattle, Washington
7:00 pm PDT	Bakken 7'; Kellum 63', 67'; 119'	Report	48', 58', 95'; Ohannesian 77'; Espinosa 114'	Stadium: Roosevelt High School

October 26, 2024 West B	Las Vegas Legends (NISAN) (Nevada)	6–1	(Nevada) Soccer Academy Nevada (NISAN)	Las Vegas, Nevada
7:00 pm PDT		Report		Stadium: Faith Lutheran High School

October 27, 2024 Texas	Austin Thunder (AMSA) (Texas)	0–1	(Texas) 210 FC (UPSL)	Austin, Texas
10:00 am CDT		Report		Stadium: Onion Creek Soccer Complex

October 27, 2024 Florida	Miami United FC (UPSL) (Florida)	5–0	(Florida) River Miami FC (USSL)	Miami Gardens, Florida
5:30 pm EDT		Report		Stadium: Dr. Lester B. Brown Park

October 27, 2024 Florida	Inter Nona Soccer Club (USSL) (Florida)	2–0	(Florida) International Soccer Association (UPSL)	Orlando, Florida
5:30 pm EDT		Report		Stadium: Young Pine Community Park

October 27, 2024 Texas	D'Feeters Kicks Soccer Club (DSA) (Texas)	1–4	(Texas) FORO SC (UPSL)	Sunnyvale, Texas
5:00 pm CDT		Report		Stadium: Sunnyvale High School

October 27, 2024 Texas	Houston Regals SCA (USSL) (Texas)	3–2	(Texas) ASC New Stars (HFA)	Katy, Texas
6:00 pm CDT		Report		Stadium: British International School of Houston

October 27, 2024 California South	FC Balboa (UPSL) (California)	0–3	(California) Chula Vista FC (SWPL)	San Diego, California
4:30 pm PDT		Report		Stadium: Logan Memorial Educational Complex

October 27, 2024 West A	Holac FC (UPSL) (Washington (state))	1–2	(Washington (state)) Washington Athletic Club (SRATS)	Tukwila, Washington
5:00 pm PDT		Report		Stadium: Werner L. Neudorf Stadium

October 27, 2024 California North	FC Folsom (UPSL) (California)	1–3	(California) Real Galt FC (UPSL)	Folsom, California
6:00 pm PDT		Report		Stadium: Folsom Lake College

October 27, 2024 California North	Modesto City Football Club (NISAN) (California)	0–7	(California) Valley 559 FC (UPSL)	Modesto, California
6:00 pm PDT		Report		Stadium: Central Catholic High School

October 27, 2024 California North	JASA RWC (SWPL) (California)	3–5 (a.e.t.)	(California) International San Francisco (SFSFL)	Redwood City, California
		Report		Stadium: Red Morton Community Park

October 27, 2024 West B	Next Level Soccer (UPSL) (Arizona)	2–1	(New Mexico) UDA Soccer (UPSL)	Mesa, Arizona
		Report		Stadium: Mesa High School

- Byes
  - Colorado - Harpos FC
  - DMV - Virginia Dream FC
  - Midwest B - Woodland Football Club
  - Northeast B - Pittsburgh Dynamo
  - Pennsylvania - Philadelphia Ukrainians Nationals
  - Texas - StrikerZ DFW Soccer Club

=== Third Qualifying Round ===
Eight groups held their third qualifying round matches on Oct. 26 & 27, and the other eight groups held their third qualifying round matches on November 16 & 17

October 26, 2024 East	Dalton United (UPSL) (Georgia (U.S. state))	0–0 (a.e.t.) (4–1 SO)	(North Carolina) Mint Hill FC (UPSL)	Dalton, Georgia
6:00 pm EDT		Report		Stadium: Dalton Stadium

October 26, 2024 Mid-Atlantic	New Jersey Alliance FC (UPSL)	6–1	(Pennsylvania) Alloy Soccer Club (EPSL)	Clifton, New Jersey
7:15 pm EDT	Stvil, 85'; Preciado; Elezaj 40', 64'; Coulibably 90'	Report	Ramirez 50'	Stadium: Athenia Steel Park

October 26, 2024 Pennsylvania	West Chester United SC (USLPA) (Pennsylvania)	6–1	(Pennsylvania) Philadelphia Ukrainian Nationals (USLPA)	West Chester, Pennsylvania
		Report		Stadium: Kildare's Turf Field

October 26, 2024 DMV	MSI Pro (UPSL) (Maryland)	0–2	(Washington, D.C.) Aegean Hawks FC (APL)	Upper Marlboro, Maryland
		Report		Stadium: Liberty Sports Park

October 26, 2024 Pennsylvania	Kensington Soccer Club (EPSL) (Pennsylvania)	2–4	(Pennsylvania) Vereinigung Erzgebirge (USLPA)	Philadelphia, Pennsylvania
8:00 pm EDT		Report		Stadium: Tiger Field

October 27, 2024 Northeast B	Pittsburgh Dynamo (GPSL) (Pennsylvania)	0–1	(New York (state)) FCY New York (UPSL)	Pittsburgh, Pennsylvania
12:00 pm EDT		Report	Fikiri 90+3'	Stadium: Highmark Stadium

October 27, 2024 Mid-Atlantic	Steel Pulse FC (MSSL) (Maryland)	4–2	(Virginia) VA Revolution Pro (UPSL)	Baltimore, Maryland
3:00 pm EDT		Report		Stadium: Milford Mill Academy

October 27, 2024 Colorado	FC Denver (CPL) (Colorado)	0–2	(Colorado) Harpos FC (CPL)	Denver, Colorado
3:00 pm MDT		Report		Stadium: Northfield High School

October 27, 2024 Northeast A	Project Football (UPSL) (Massachusetts)	1–4	(Massachusetts) CD Faialense (BSSL)	Salem, Massachusetts
7;00 pm EDT		Report		Stadium: Captain John Bertram Field

October 27, 2024 New York	Zum Schneider FC 03 (EPSL) (New York (state))	1–3	(New York (state)) Lansdowne Yonkers FC (EPSL)	New York, New York
7:00 pm EDT		Report		Stadium: Jack McManus Field

October 27, 2024 New York	Leros SC (LIFSL) (New York (state))	0–6	(New York (state)) NY Renegades FC (UPSL)	Central Islip, New York
7:00 pm EDT		Report		Stadium: SUSA Orlin & Cohen Sports Complex

October 27, 2024 East	Bowling Green FC (UPSL) (Kentucky)	0–5	Southern Indiana FC (UPSL)	Bowling Green, Kentucky
7:00 pm CDT		Report		Stadium: Bowling Green Junior High School

October 27, 2024 DMV	Virginia Dream FC (VSSL)	2–1 (a.e.t.)	(Virginia) Alexandria Reds (UPSL)	Falls Church, Virginia
8:00 pm EDT		Report		Stadium: Meridian High School

October 29, 2024 Colorado	Azteca FC (CPL) (Colorado)	4–1	(Colorado) Colorado Rovers (CPL)	Arvada, Colorado
7:30 pm MDT		Report		Stadium: Long Lake Field Number 3

November 16, 2024 Florida	O'Shea's FC (USSL) (Florida)	0–3	(Florida) Miami United FC (UPSL)	West Palm Beach, Florida
4:00 pm EST		Report	Fernandez 75'; Insua 86',	Stadium: Gaines Park

November 16, 2024 Florida	Harbor City FC (UPSL) (Florida)	5–1	(Florida) Palm Beach Flames SC (UPSL)	Melbourne, Florida
7:00 pm EST	Collins; Notardonato 30' (39); Shelton 48'; Licor 88'	Report	Castellanos 71'	Stadium: Melbourne High School

November 16, 2024 Florida	FC America CFL Spurs (USSL) (Florida)	2–0	(Florida) Inter Nona Soccer Club (USSL)	Lake Mary, Florida
7:00 pm EST	Blanco; John J 25'	Report		Stadium: Lake Mary High School

November 16, 2024 Midwest B	Tulsa Athletic (UPSL) (Oklahoma)	8–0	(Kansas) Woodland Football Club (TSL)	Tulsa, Oklahoma
7:00 pm CST	Torres 13'; Zamaron 38', 58', Flores 62'; Ruiz 83'; Diallo 90'; Carrasco 90'	Report		Stadium: Athletic Community Stadium

November 16, 2024 Texas	210 FC (UPSL) (Texas)	2–3	(Texas) Houston Regals SCA (USSL)	San Antonio, Texas
7:30 pm CST		Report		Stadium: South Texas Area Regional Soccer Complex

November 16, 2024 California North	Bay Valley Suns Sports Club (UPSL) (California)	0–1 (a.e.t.)	(California) Valley 559 FC (UPSL)	Livermore, California
7:00 pm PST		Report	Gonzales 109'	Stadium: Las Positas College

November 16, 2024 California North	Real Galt FC (UPSL) (California)	1–4	(California) International San Francisco (SFSFL)	Galt, California
7:00 pm PST	Ruiz 64'	Report	Hernandez 9'; Autran; Callan 79'; Argast 88'	Stadium: Galt High School

November 16, 2024 California South	Laguna United FC (UPSL) (California)	3–1	(California) Irvine FC (UPSL)	Laguna Niguel, California
7:00 pm PST		Report		Stadium: La Paz Sports Park

November 16, 2024 West B	Las Vegas Legends (NISAN) (Nevada)	2–1	(Arizona) Next Level Soccer (UPSL)	Las Vegas, Nevada
7:00 pm PST	Coronel 9'; Soto 17'	Report	Sanatana 41'	Stadium: Faith Lutheran High School

November 17, 2024 Midwest A	Wisloka Chicago (UPSL) (Illinois)	1–2	(Illinois) Chicago House AC (MWPL)	Bensenville, Illinois
3:00 pm CST	Wojcik 30'	Report	Smith 51'; Avalos 90+4'	Stadium: Redmond Park

November 17, 2024 Texas	StrikerZ DFW Soccer Club (DSA) (Texas)	1–4	(Texas) FORO SC (UPSL)	Lucas, Texas
6:00 pm CST		Report		Stadium: Willow Springs Stadium

November 17, 2024 West A	Washington Athletic Club (SRATS) (Washington (state))	5–0	(Oregon) Deportivo Rose City (UPSL)	Shoreline, Washington
5:30 pm PST		Report		Stadium: Shoreline Soccer Field

November 17, 2024 Florida	Red Force FC (PF) (Florida)	4–0	(Florida) Pinecrest Premier SC (UPSL)	Miami, Florida
8:30 pm EST		Report		Stadium: Kendall Soccer Park

November 17, 2024 California South	San Diego Internacional (UPSL) (California)	3–2	(California) Chula Vista FC (SWPL)	San Diego, California
6:00 pm PST	Benito Cruz 7'; Heine 43'; Raley 90+3'	Report	Rojas 11', 45+2'	Stadium: Mission Bay High School

=== Fourth Qualifying Round ===
Seven groups (Northeast A & B combined) held their fourth qualifying round matches on Nov. 17 & 18, and the other six groups (West A & B and Midwest A & B) held their fourth qualifying round matches on December 7 & 8

November 16, 2024 East	Southern Indiana FC (UPSL)	3–0	(Georgia (U.S. state)) Dalton United (UPSL)	New Albany, Indiana
6:00 pm EST		Report		Stadium: Green Valley Soccer Complex

November 16, 2024 Northeast	CD Faialense (BSSL) (Massachusetts)	3–1	(New York (state)) FCY New York (UPSL)	Winthrop, Massachusetts
6:00 pm EST		Report		Stadium: Miller Field

November 16, 2024 Mid–Atlantic	New Jersey Alliance FC (UPSL)	2–2 (a.e.t.) (4–2 SO)	(Maryland) Steel Pulse FC (MSSL)	Clifton, New Jersey
6:00 pm EST	Elezaj 82'; Coulibably 120+1'		Jude 90+2'; Olusesi 106'	Stadium: Athenia Steel Park

November 16, 2024 Pennsylvania	West Chester United SC (USLPA) (Pennsylvania)	2–1	(Pennsylvania) Vereinigung Erzgebirge (USLPA)	West Chester, Pennsylvania
7:30 pm EST	Roby 38' (pen.); Luchini	Report	Antonini 56'	Stadium: Kildare's Turf Field

November 16, 2024 DMV	Virginia Dream FC (VSSL)	2–1	(Washington, D.C.) Aegean Hawks FC (APL)	Falls Church, Virginia
8:00 pm EST	Likulia 17' (pen.); Akinkoye 89'	Report	Omunyidde 52'	Stadium: Meridian High School

November 17, 2024 Colorado	Harpos FC (CPL) (Colorado)	2–0	(Colorado) Azteca FC (CPL)	Broomfield, Colorado
12:00 pm MST	O'Brien 48'; Mickelson 76'	Report		Stadium: Broomfield County Commons Park

November 17, 2024 New York	NY Renegades FC (UPSL) (New York (state))	1–1 (a.e.t.) (4–1 SO)	(New York (state)) Lansdowne Yonkers FC (EPSL)	Central Islip, New York
7:00 pm EST	Kavanagh 78'	Report	Solano 82'	Stadium: SUSA Orlin & Cohen Sports Complex

December 7, 2024 Florida	Harbor City FC (UPSL) (Florida)	0–0 (a.e.t.) (5–4 SO)	(Florida) FC America CFL Spurs (USSL)
7:00 pm EST		Report

December 7, 2024 Texas	FORO SC (UPSL) (Texas)	4–2	(Texas) Houston Regals SCA (USSL)
7:00 pm CST		Report

December 7, 2024 West	Washington Athletic Club (SRATS) (Washington (state))	W–L (forfeit)	(Nevada) Las Vegas Legends (NISAN)
		Report
Note: Las Vegas Legands forfeited due to not being able to field enough players.

December 8, 2024 Midwest	Chicago House AC (MWPL) (Illinois)	0–0 (a.e.t.) (4–5 SO)	(Oklahoma) Tulsa Athletic (UPSL)
1:00 pm CST		Report

December 8, 2024 Florida	Miami United FC (UPSL) (Florida)	3–2	(Florida) Red Force FC (PF)
8:00 pm EST		Report

December 8, 2024 California South	San Diego Internacional (UPSL) (California)	2–6	(California) Laguna United FC (UPSL)
6:00 pm PST		Report

December 8, 2024 California North	Valley 559 FC (UPSL) (California)	4–5	(California) International San Francisco (SFSFL)
7:00 pm PST		Report
