= 2022 NISA Nation season =

Soccer season

NISA Nation

The 2022 NISA Nation season was the second season of NISA Nation, the National Independent Soccer Association's amateur league.

== Teams ==
=== Incoming Teams ===
- AFC Solano
- AFC South Bay
- Aiolikos FC USA Rush
- Allentown United FC
- Atletico Orlando
- Battleborn FC
- Boston Athletic SC
- Capo FC
- Club De Lyon FC
- Deportivo Lake Mary
- Inter United FC
- San Francisco Elite Metro FC
- New York Braveheart SC
- Oaks FC
- Sporting ID11
- Union SC
- Valley FC Raiders
- Winter Haven United FC

=== Departing Teams ===
- Chula Vista FC
- New Amsterdam FC II
- New Jersey Teamsterz FC
- Steel Pulse FC
- Valley United FC U23

=== 2022 Teams ===
==== Florida Region ====
Team	City	Stadium	Founded	First season
Athletico Orlando	Orlando, Florida	Northeast Regional Park	2017	2022
Club De Lyon FC	Orlando, Florida	Northeast Regional Park	2021	2022
Deportivo Lake Mary	Lake Mary, Florida	Lake Mary High School	2017	2022
Inter United FC	Davenport, Florida	Feltrim Sports Complex	1997	2022
Winter Haven United FC	Winter Haven, Florida	Feltrim Sports Complex	2016	2022

==== Northeast Region ====
Team	City	Stadium	Founded	First season
Aiolikos FC USA Rush	Boston, Massachusetts	Cawley Memorial Stadium	1975	2022
Albion SC Delaware	Middletown, Delaware	DE Turf Sports Complex	2020	2021
Allentown United FC	Allentown, Pennsylvania	Cedar Crest College	2018	2022
Atlantic City FC	Atlantic City, New Jersey	Rowan University	2017	2021
Boston Athletic SC	Boston, Massachusetts	Harry Della Russo Stadium	2005	2022
New Jersey Alliance FC	Clifton, New Jersey	Newark Schools Stadium	2012	2021
New York Braveheart SC	New York, New York	Orlin and Cohen Sports Complex	2022	2022
Union SC	Union Township, New Jersey	Volunteer Field	1984	2022

==== Pacific Region ====
Team	City	Stadium	Founded	First season
AFC Solano	Fairfield, California	Armijo High School	2020	2022
AFC South Bay	San Jose, California	Watson Park Soccer Fields	2021	2022
Battleborn FC	Minden, Nevada	Douglas High School	2021	2022
San Francisco Elite Metro FC	San Francisco, California	Negoesco Stadium	2017	2022

==== Southwest Region ====
Team	City	Stadium	Founded	First season
Capo FC	San Juan Capistrano, California	JSerra Catholic High School	2006	2022
FC Golden State Force	Pomona, California	No fixed stadium	2015	2021
Las Vegas Legends	Las Vegas, Nevada	Peter Johann Memorial Field	2012	2021
Oaks FC	Thousand Oaks, California	California Lutheran University	1979	2022
Sporting ID11	Lake Forest, California	Lake Forest Sports Complex	2021	2022
Valley FC Raiders	Gilbert, Arizona	Mesquite High School	2021	2022

=== Location map ===
NISA Nation clubs
Northeast Region; Florida Region; Southwest Region; Pacific Region

== Competition format ==
The 2022 season saw the addition of Florida and Pacific Regions. In each region, the team with the most points at the end of the season is the champion. There are no playoffs or national championship.

- Florida Region: Clubs play each other three times for a total of 12 matches.
- Northeast Region: Clubs are divided geographically into two groups. Clubs play the teams in their group twice and the teams in the other group once for a total of 10 matches.
- Pacific Region: Clubs play each other twice for a total of 6 matches.
- Southwest Region: Clubs play each other twice for a total of 10 matches.

== Standings ==
=== Florida Region ===
Pos	Team	Pld	W	D	L	GF	GA	GD	Pts
1	Club De Lyon FC (C)	12	10	1	1	48	8	+40	31
2	Atletico Orlando	12	9	0	3	30	16	+14	27
3	Deportivo Lake Mary	12	3	4	5	23	22	+1	13
4	Winter Haven United FC	12	2	2	8	16	44	−28	8
5	Inter United FC	12	1	3	8	13	40	−27	6

Source: https://nisanation.com/table
(C) Champions

=== Northeast Region ===
Pos	Team	Pld	W	D	L	GF	GA	GD	Pts
1	New Jersey Alliance FC (C)	10	8	2	0	32	3	+29	26
2	Union SC	10	8	0	2	24	8	+16	24
3	New York Braveheart SC	10	5	5	0	27	8	+19	20
4	Allentown United FC	10	5	1	4	27	16	+11	16
5	Aiolikos FC USA Rush	10	4	1	5	16	16	0	13
6	Atlantic City FC	10	3	2	5	19	17	+2	11
7	Boston Athletic SC	10	1	0	9	2	30	−28	3
8	Albion SC Delaware	10	0	1	9	4	53	−49	1

Source: https://nisanation.com/table
(C) Champions

=== Pacific Region ===
Pos	Team	Pld	W	D	L	GF	GA	GD	Pts
1	Battleborn FC (C)	6	5	1	0	32	5	+27	16
2	AFC South Bay	6	3	2	1	22	11	+11	11
3	San Francisco Elite Metro	6	2	1	3	10	14	−4	7
4	AFC Solano	6	0	0	6	3	37	−34	0

Source: https://nisanation.com/table
(C) Champions

=== Southwest Region ===
Pos	Team	Pld	W	D	L	GF	GA	GD	Pts
1	Capo FC (C)	10	8	1	1	32	12	+20	25
2	FC Golden State Force	10	5	3	2	26	12	+14	18
3	Las Vegas Legends	10	5	2	3	25	15	+10	17
4	Oaks FC	10	3	4	3	19	18	+1	13
5	Sporting ID11	10	2	2	6	14	23	−9	8
6	Valley FC Raiders	10	1	0	9	10	46	−36	3

Source: https://nisanation.com/table
(C) Champions

== See also ==
- NISA Nation
- National Independent Soccer Association
- 2022 National Independent Soccer Association season
