= 2021 NISA Nation season =

First season of NISA Nation

NISA Nation
- Dates: September 18 – January 23
- Champions: New Jersey Alliance FC (Northeast Region); FC Golden State Force (Southwest Region)
- Matches played: 42
- Goals scored: 178 (4.24 per match)
- Top goalscorer: Samuel Goni (GOL); 9 goals
- Biggest home win: NJA 16–0 BFC (Sep 26)
- Biggest away win: BFC 1–9 STP (Oct 2); ATL 0-8 NA2 (Nov 14)
- Highest scoring: NJA 16–0 BFC (Sep 26)
- Longest winning run: 5 matches NJA
- Longest unbeaten run: 9 matches NA2
- Longest winless run: 8 matches BFC
- Longest losing run: 8 matches BFC
- All statistics correct as of Jan 23.

The 2021 NISA Nation season has been the first season of NISA Nation. It was the inaugural season for the National Independent Soccer Association 4th tier league.

The season has been made by 10 founder teams divided in two regions and the two toppers of the two regions have been crowned champions of their own regions.

== History ==
=== Northeast Division ===
The season was played from September 18 to December 12. The Northeast Division ended on December 13, 2021, with a showdown between New Jersey Alliance FC and New Amsterdam FC II. It ended in a 4–0 score in favor of NJAFC.

The inaugural fall season for the Northeast had 28 games, 116 goals scored, 4.14 goals per match, and 210 players registered during its play.

=== Southwest Division ===
The season was played from October 30 to January 23. The southwest Division champion was discovered on January 15, 2021, with a final showdown between FC Golden State Force and Las Vegas Legends. It ended in a 4–3 score in favor of FCGSF.

The inaugural fall season for the Southwest had 12 games, 56 goals scored, 4.66 goals per match, and 151 players registered during its play.

== Teams ==
=== Northeast Region ===
Team	City	Stadium	Founded
Atlantic City FC	Atlantic City, New Jersey	Annapolis Avenue Recreation Complex	2017
Bearfight @ Albion SC Delaware	Middletown, Delaware	Appoquinimink High School	2020
New Amsterdam FC II	New York, New York	Orlin & Cohen Sports Complex	2020
New Jersey Alliance FC	Clifton, New Jersey	Montclair State University	2012
New Jersey Teamsterz FC	Bayonne, New Jersey	Don Ahern Veterans Memorial Stadium	2017
Steel Pulse FC	Baltimore, Maryland	Blandair Regional Park West Playground	2019

=== Southwest Region ===
Team	City	Stadium	Founded
Chula Vista FC	Chula Vista, California	Terra Nova Park	1982
FC Golden State Force	Pomona, California	Rio Hondo College	2015
Las Vegas Legends	Las Vegas, Nevada	Peter Johann Memorial Field	2012
Valley United FC U23	Scottsdale, Arizona	GCU Stadium	2020

=== Location map ===
NISA Nation clubs
Northeast Region; Southwest Region

== Competition format ==
The inaugural regions were the Northeast and Southwest. In each region, the team with the most points at the end of the season is the champion. There are no playoffs or national championship.

- Northeast Region: Clubs play each other twice for a total of 10 matches.
- Southwest Region: Clubs play each other twice for a total of 6 matches.

== Standings ==
=== Northeast Region ===
Pos	Team	Pld	W	D	L	GF	GA	GD	Pts
1	New Jersey Alliance FC (C)	10	8	1	1	38	11	+27	25
2	New Amsterdam FC II	10	7	2	1	28	10	+18	23
3	Steel Pulse FC	10	5	3	2	23	6	+17	18
4	New Jersey Teamsterz FC	10	2	1	7	11	20	−9	7
5	Atlantic City FC	10	2	1	7	14	28	−14	7
6	Bearfight @ Albion SC Delaware	10	2	0	8	8	47	−39	6

Source: https://nisanation.com/table

Home \ Away	ATL	BFC	NA2	NJA	NJT	STP
Atlantic City	—	5–0	0–8	2–6	3–0*	0–3
BFC ASC Delaware	2–1	—	2–4	0–1	3–0*	1–9
New Amsterdam II	4–0	1–0	—	4–1	4–1	1–1
NJ Alliance	2–2	16–0	4–0	—	2–1	1–0
NJ Teamsterz	2–1	3–0	1–2	2–3	—	0–0
Steel Pulse	1–0	7–0	0–0	0–2	2–1	—

Source: https://nisanation.com/table
Legend: Blue = home team win; Yellow = draw; Red = away team win.

(*) New Jersey Teamsterz FC forfeited these games, which were awarded as 3—0 victories for their opponents

=== Southwest Region ===
Pos	Team	Pld	W	D	L	GF	GA	GD	Pts
1	FC Golden State Force (C)	6	4	1	1	22	11	+11	13
2	Las Vegas Legends	6	2	3	1	13	11	+2	9
3	Chula Vista FC	6	2	0	4	10	17	−7	6
4	Valley United FC U23	6	1	2	3	11	17	−6	5

Source: https://nisanation.com/table

Home \ Away	CHU	GOL	LVL	VAL
Chula Vista	—	4–3	0–2	3–1
Golden State	6–1	—	1–1	5–1
Las Vegas	2–1	3–4	—	1–1
Valley United U23	3–1	1–3	4–4	—

Source: https://nisanation.com/table
Legend: Blue = home team win; Yellow = draw; Red = away team win.

== Golden Boot winner ==
Northeast Region Golden boot recipient Henry Martinez of New Amsterdam II. 7 goals scored.

Southwest Region Golden boot recipient Samuel Goni of FC Golden State Force. 9 goals scored.

== See also ==
- NISA Nation
- National Independent Soccer Association
- 2021 National Independent Soccer Association season
