= 2024 U.S. Open Cup qualification =

2024 Lamar Hunt U.S. Open Cup qualification
Tournament details
- Country: United States
- Dates: September 9 – November 19, 2023
- Teams: 109
- Qualified: Azteca FC (CPL); Brockton FC United (UPSL); Chicago House AC (MPL); Christos FC (MSSL); FC America CFL Spurs (UPSL); FC Folsom (UPSL); Foro SC (UPSL); Irvine Zeta FC (UPSL); Miami United FC (USSL); South Carolina United Heat (UPSL); Vereinigung Erzgebirge (USLP)

Tournament statistics
- Matches played: 98
- Goals scored: 413 (4.21 per match)
- All statistics correct as of 14:28, September 10, 2023 (UTC).

The 2024 Lamar Hunt U.S. Open Cup qualification served as local qualification for the 109th edition of the oldest soccer tournament in the United States. The tournament proper featured both professional and amateur teams in the United States soccer league system.

Qualification for the 2024 tournament included local qualifying matches contested by 109 amateur teams scheduled to take place in 2023. One team also qualified by winning the 2023 National Amateur Cup and one team qualified by winning the 2023 United Premier Soccer League Spring Championships. Clubs playing in fully professional leagues are required to enter the tournament.

== Qualification procedures ==
The United States Soccer Federation's Open Cup Committee manages both the tournament proper and the local qualification process.

Clubs based in the United States that play in a league that is an organization member of U.S. Soccer are generally eligible to compete for the U.S. Open Cup, so long as their league includes at least four teams and has a schedule of at least 10 matches for each club.

U.S.-based teams in Division I, II and III professional leagues qualify for the U.S. Open Cup automatically, provided they are eligible. To be eligible, these teams must be members in good standing of their leagues on December 31, 2022, and remain so through the 2024 final. The league must have been in operation prior to the open division entry deadline and remain in operation through the 2024 final. A new Division I, II or III professional league must have its match schedule announced to the public by January 31, 2023, and the first match must be scheduled for no later than seven days before the first scheduled round of the U.S. Open Cup tournament proper that involves the team's division. If a new club joins an existing Division I, II or III league, the league must meet the aforementioned criteria applicable to new leagues in order for the new club to be eligible for the U.S. Open Cup.

A professional team that is majority owned by a higher-level professional team or whose player roster is materially managed by a higher-level professional team is ineligible to participate in the U.S. Open Cup.

Clubs that are below Division III are Open Division teams. To be eligible for the 2024 U.S. Open Cup, an Open Division team must remain a playing member in good standing within its competition from the Open Division Entry Deadline through the 2024 final. The league must have been in operation since no later than the open Division Entry Deadline, and remain so until the 2024 final. A team that started its first season of competition in an existing league must have started its new league's schedule no later than Open Division Entry Deadline.

Starting in 2019, the winner of the previous year's National Amateur Cup automatically qualifies for the U.S. Open Cup. The cup winner enters the tournament proper in the first round with the other Open Division clubs.

National leagues may elect to use the results of their previous year's seasons to determine which of their teams qualify for the U.S. Open Cup in lieu of having their teams play local qualifying matches. If a national league so elects, its teams are not eligible to participate in local qualifying. To qualify as a national league, the league must

- Have a minimum of 50 active U.S.-based teams in good standing,
- Have a common championship each season that is only available to league teams and is compulsory,
- Use a league format with a standings table as opposed to a single-elimination (knockout) format,
- Have teams in at least three U.S. time zones among Eastern, Central, Mountain and Pacific, with the three time zones containing the most teams each having at least 15% of the member teams,
- Have two time zones represented by at least three different U.S. states or the District of Columbia and a third time zone represented by at least two different U.S. states or the District of Columbia,
- Have teams in at least 10 different U.S. states or the District of Columbia,
- Timely pay the team-based Open Cup entry fee for all teams in the league.
- Must have operated over the last 12-month period and over the next 12-month period in compliance with these criteria.

Eligible Open Division clubs that did not win the National Amateur Cup and are not members of national leagues must have submitted an application to enter local qualifying by July 31, 2023.

Once applications for local qualifying are approved, U.S. Soccer preliminary estimates of the number of Open Division teams needed in the U.S. Open Cup, based on the anticipated participation of professional teams and anticipated structure of the tournament bracket. One of these slots is allocated to the National Amateur Cup champions. Starting with the 2024 U.S. Open Cup, the United Premier Soccer League spring champions will be allocated one slot. The remainder are allocated among the pool of local qualification teams and the national leagues, based on the relative number of teams in each, resulting in a target number of local qualifiers. The Commissioner will establish the number of qualifying rounds needed to achieve the number of surviving local qualifying teams after the target number of First Round slots is determined. The Commissioner will attempt to minimize the number of byes in order to ensure teams that advance to the First Round have played the same number of games. Byes are distributed randomly and are meant to avoid unnecessary travel but are kept to a minimum to preserve the integrity of the qualification tournament. Once the qualification tournament format has been finalized, the number of local qualifiers becomes fixed, unless a team that qualifies later becomes ineligible. After the professional clubs entry application deadline, the final number of Open Division teams needed in the 2024 U.S. Open Cup will become known. From this number, the fixed number of local qualifiers plus one for the National Amateur Cup champion, and one for the UPSL Spring Champions are subtracted to determine the number of slots for clubs from the national leagues. These slots are allocated among the leagues based on their relative numbers of U.S. based eligible teams.

== Professional qualification ==
=== Major League Soccer ===
In March 2024, the top seven American-based MLS teams to not qualify for the 2024 CONCACAF Champions Cup, as well as the defending U.S. Open Cup champion, Houston Dynamo FC, qualified for the U.S. Open Cup.

Overall MLS standings table
Pos	Team	Pld	W	L	T	GF	GA	GD	Pts	Qualification
1	FC Cincinnati (S)	34	20	5	9	57	39	+18	69	Qualification for the CONCACAF Champions Cup Round One (Note: As 2023 MLS Supporters' Shield champions)
2	Orlando City SC	34	18	7	9	55	39	+16	63	Qualification for the CONCACAF Champions Cup Round One (Note: As highest-ranked club in 2023 MLS Supporters' Shield not already qualified)
3	Columbus Crew (C)	34	16	9	9	67	46	+21	57	Qualification for the CONCACAF Champions Cup Round of 16 (Note: As 2023 MLS Cup champions)
4	St. Louis City SC	34	17	12	5	62	45	+17	56	Qualification for the CONCACAF Champions Cup Round One (Note: As 2023 Western Conference regular season champions)
5	Philadelphia Union	34	15	9	10	57	41	+16	55	Qualification for the CONCACAF Champions Cup Round One (Note: As 2023 Leagues Cup third place)
6	New England Revolution	34	15	9	10	58	46	+12	55	Qualification for the CONCACAF Champions Cup Round One (Note: As second highest-ranked club in 2023 MLS Supporters' Shield not already qualified)
7	Seattle Sounders FC	34	14	9	11	41	32	+9	53	Qualification for the U.S. Open Cup Round of 32 (Note: As one of the top seven teams in the overall table to not qualify for the 2024 CONCACAF Champions Cup)
8	Los Angeles FC	34	14	10	10	54	39	+15	52	Qualification for the U.S. Open Cup Round of 32
9	Houston Dynamo FC (U)	34	14	11	9	51	38	+13	51	Qualification for the CONCACAF Champions Cup Round One and U.S. Open Cup Round of 32 (Note: Qualify for both the Champions Cup and U.S. Open Cup as 2023 U.S. Open Cup champions)
10	Atlanta United FC	34	13	9	12	66	53	+13	51	Qualification for the U.S. Open Cup Round of 32
11	Real Salt Lake	34	14	12	8	48	50	−2	50	Qualification for the U.S. Open Cup Round of 32
12	Nashville SC	34	13	11	10	39	32	+7	49	Qualification for the CONCACAF Champions Cup Round One (Note: As 2023 Leagues Cup runner-up)
13	Vancouver Whitecaps FC (V)	34	12	10	12	55	48	+7	48	Qualification for the CONCACAF Champions Cup Round One (Note: As 2023 Canadian Championship winners)
14	FC Dallas	34	11	10	13	41	37	+4	46	Qualification for the U.S. Open Cup Round of 32
15	Sporting Kansas City	34	12	14	8	48	51	−3	44	Qualification for the U.S. Open Cup Round of 32
16	San Jose Earthquakes	34	10	10	14	39	43	−4	44	Qualification for the U.S. Open Cup Round of 32
17	New York Red Bulls	34	11	13	10	36	39	−3	43	
18	Portland Timbers	34	11	13	10	46	58	−12	43	
19	Charlotte FC	34	10	11	13	45	52	−7	43	
20	CF Montréal	34	12	17	5	36	52	−16	41	
21	Minnesota United FC	34	10	13	11	46	51	−5	41	
22	New York City FC	34	9	11	14	35	39	−4	41	
23	D.C. United	34	10	14	10	45	49	−4	40	
24	Chicago Fire FC	34	10	14	10	39	51	−12	40	
25	Austin FC	34	10	15	9	49	55	−6	39	
26	LA Galaxy	34	8	14	12	51	67	−16	36	
27	Inter Miami CF (L)	34	9	18	7	41	54	−13	34	Qualification for the CONCACAF Champions Cup Round of 16 (Note: As 2023 Leagues Cup champion)
28	Colorado Rapids	34	5	17	12	26	54	−28	27	
29	Toronto FC	34	4	20	10	26	59	−33	22	

Source: MLS
Rules for classification: 1) points; 2) total wins; 3) total goal differential; 4) total goals scored; 5) fewer disciplinary points; 6) away goal differential; 7) away goals scored; 8) home goals differential; 9) home goals scored; 10) coin toss (2 clubs tied) or drawing of lots (≥3 clubs tied)
(C) MLS Cup champion; (L) Leagues Cup winner; (S) Supporters' Shield winner; (U) U.S. Open Cup winner; (V) Canadian Championship winner

== MLS Next Pro ==
The following nine clubs qualified for the 2023 U.S. Open Cup.

Pos	Team	Pld	W	SOW	SOL	L	GF	GA	GD	Pts	Awards
1	Colorado Rapids 2	28	19	4	1	4	70	37	+33	66	Regular season champion and U.S. Open Cup First Round
2	Crown Legacy FC	28	19	4	1	4	60	34	+26	66	U.S. Open Cup First Round
3	Tacoma Defiance	28	14	6	3	5	57	36	+21	57	
4	New England Revolution II	28	14	6	2	6	57	41	+16	56	
5	Columbus Crew 2	28	16	3	0	9	58	46	+12	54	
6	New York Red Bulls II	28	14	3	3	8	53	36	+17	51	U.S. Open Cup First Round
7	Sporting Kansas City II	28	13	4	2	9	60	42	+18	49	U.S. Open Cup First Round
8	Austin FC II	28	12	4	5	7	40	23	+17	49	
9	St. Louis City 2	28	11	5	4	8	49	39	+10	47	
10	Orlando City B	28	13	2	3	10	59	61	−2	46	
11	San Jose Earthquakes II	28	11	5	2	10	41	36	+5	45	
12	Houston Dynamo 2	28	12	3	1	12	50	44	+6	43	
13	Minnesota United FC 2	28	10	5	3	10	50	52	−2	43	U.S. Open Cup First Round
14	Chicago Fire FC II	28	9	5	6	8	54	46	+8	43	U.S. Open Cup First Round
15	Philadelphia Union II	28	12	2	2	12	54	57	−3	42	
16	New York City FC II	28	12	1	3	12	60	55	+5	41	U.S. Open Cup First Round
17	Huntsville City FC	28	9	4	3	12	48	45	+3	38	
18	North Texas SC	28	9	1	7	11	43	45	−2	36	
19	Atlanta United 2	28	9	2	4	13	50	52	−2	35	
20	Portland Timbers 2	28	11	0	1	16	40	63	−23	34	U.S. Open Cup First Round
21	Whitecaps FC 2	28	8	3	4	13	36	49	−13	34	
22	Real Monarchs	28	8	2	3	15	27	54	−27	31	
23	Toronto FC II	28	6	3	5	14	43	57	−14	29	
24	FC Cincinnati 2	28	7	2	2	17	37	65	−28	27	
25	Los Angeles FC 2	28	6	0	7	15	30	39	−9	25	
26	LA Galaxy II	28	5	4	2	17	36	74	−38	25	U.S. Open Cup First Round
27	Inter Miami CF II	28	5	1	5	17	34	68	−34	22	

Source: MLSNP
Rules for classification: 1) points; 2) total wins; 3) total goal differential; 4) total goals scored; 5) fewer disciplinary points; 6) away goal differential; 7) away goals scored; 8) home goals differential; 9) home goals scored; 10) coin toss (2 clubs tied) or drawing of lots (≥3 clubs tied)

== Amateur qualification ==
=== National Amateur Cup ===
SC MesoAmerica defeated Newtown Pride FC 2–1, to win the 2023 National Amateur Cup and qualify for the 2024 U.S. Open Cup.

=== United Premier Soccer League Spring Champions ===
AS Frenzi defeated Sporting Wichita SC 2–1, to win the 2023 UPSL Spring Championships and earning a direct qualification into the 2024 U.S. Open Cup.

=== Local qualifying ===
U.S. Soccer originally announced that 109 teams would participate in local qualifying. Four rounds of local qualifying matches will result in 11 clubs advancing to the tournament proper. Local qualifying will be competed in a single-game, knockout format and match-ups will be organized geographically to minimize travel time and expenses. Random selection will be used to determine matchups when possible and coin flips will determine home teams.

==== Schedule ====
Schedule for 2023 Lamar Hunt U.S. Open Cup Qualifying
Round	Match day	New Teams	Entrants	Teams entered to date
First Qualifying Round	September 9–10, 2023	42	42	42
Second Qualifying Round	September 30–October 1, 2023	67	88	109
Third Qualifying Round	October 21–22, 2023	0	44	109
Fourth Qualifying Round	November 18–19, 2023	0	22	109

==== Number of teams by state and league ====
A total of 22 states and the District of Columbia are represented by clubs in the U.S. Open Cup Qualification this year.

	States	Number	League	Teams
1	California	11	UPSL	Elk Grove Blues, Escondido FC, FC Folsom, Irvine FC, Irvine Zeta, Laguna United FC, Murrieta Soccer Academy, Rebels Soccer Club, Santa Monica Surf, Trojans FC, Valley 559 FC
1	California	4	NISA Nation	Bay Area United, Capo FC, Jasa RWC, Temecula FC
1	California	3	San Francisco Soccer Football League	International San Francisco SC, San Francisco Vikings Soccer Club, Olympic Club
1	California	2	National Soccer League	Marin County Union SC, Real San Jose
1	California	1	West Coast Soccer Association	UC Davis Soccer Club
2	Florida	9	UPSL	FC America CFL Spurs, Chargers Soccer Club, Dade County FC, Deportivo Lake Mary FC, Florida Premier FC, Harbor City FC, Leg-AZ World FC, Parkland Soccer Club, Royal Palms Soccer Club
2	Florida	8	United States Soccer League	City Soccer FC, Florida Brothers, Hodler Miami FC, Miami Soccer Academy, Miami United FC, Orlando FC Wolves, O'Shea's FC, Soccer Paradise FC
2	Florida	1	Florida Gold Coast League	Hurricane FC
3	New York	4	Eastern Premier Soccer League	Lansdowne Yonkers, New York Greek-American, New York Pancyprian-Freedoms, Zum Schneider FC 03
3	New York	3	UPSL	New York Braveheart SC, NY Renegades FC, Sahara Gunners FC
3	New York	1	Cosmopolitan Soccer League	Manhattan Kickers SC
3	New York	1	Rochester District Soccer League	IASC Boom
3	Texas	3	UPSL	Alamo City Soccer Club, Foro SC, Tenfifteen FC
3	Texas	2	Austin Men's Soccer Association	Austin Longhorns, Austin Thunder
3	Texas	2	Gulf Coast Premier League	Central Texas Lobos, Daggers CTX
3	Texas	2	United States Soccer League	Athletic Katy FC, Houston FC
5	Pennsylvania	4	United Soccer League of Pennsylvania	Colonial SC, Philadelphia Ukrainians Nationals, United German Hungarians, Vereinigung Erzgebirge
5	Pennsylvania	2	UPSL	Lancaster Elite, Philadelphia Lone Star
5	Pennsylvania	2	Eastern Premier Soccer League	Kensington Soccer Club, Philadelphia Heritage SC
6	Colorado	4	Colorado Premier League	Azteca FC, Colorado Rovers, FC Denver, Harpos
6	Colorado	1	Mountain Premier League	Peak Eleven Football Club
7	Illinois	3	Midwest Premier League	Berber City FC, Chicago House AC, Edgewater Castle Football Club
7	Illinois	2	UPSL	Chicago Strikers, Wisloka Chicago
8	Georgia	2	UPSL	Kalonji Pro-Profile, North Georgia United
8	Georgia	2	Atlanta District Amateur Soccer League	Majestic Soccer Club, Terminus FC
8	Massachusetts	2	Bay State Soccer League	CD Faialense, FC Omens
8	Massachusetts	2	UPSL	Boston Street FC, Brockton FC United
8	Virginia	3	UPSL	Arlington SA, VA Revolution Pro, Villarreal CF Virginia
8	Virginia	1	Eastern Premier Soccer League	NoVa FC
11	Arizona	2	UPSL	Coronado Athletic Club, SC Union Maricopa
11	Arizona	1	Southwest Premier League	Sporting Arizona FC
11	District of Columbia	2	American Premier League	Aegean Hawks, Yinz United
11	District of Columbia	1	DC Premier League	DCFC
11	Maryland	2	Maryland Super Soccer League	Christos, Steel Pulse
11	Maryland	1	UPSL	MoCo 1776 FC
11	New Jersey	1	Eastern Premier Soccer League	Real Central NJ
11	New Jersey	1	Garden State Soccer League	SC Vistula Garfield
11	New Jersey	1	UPSL	New Jersey Alliance
11	Washington	2	UPSL	Bellevue Athletic FC, Holac FC
11	Washington	1	Recreational Adult Team Soccer	Sharktopus Football Club
16	Alabama	1	UPSL	FC Birmingham
16	Connecticut	1	UPSL	Ole Football Club
16	New Mexico	1	UPSL	UDA Soccer
16	Nevada	1	NISA Nation	Battleborn FC
16	North Carolina	1	UPSL	Mint Hill FC
16	Ohio	1	Ohio Valley Premier League	Valhalla FC
16	South Carolina	1	UPSL	South Carolina United Heat
16	Tennessee	1	UPSL	Tennessee Tempo FC
16	Utah	1	UPSL	Provo Athletic Club

- States without a team in the Open Cup Qualification: Alaska, Arkansas, Delaware, Hawaii, Idaho, Indiana, Iowa, Louisiana, Kansas, Kentucky, Maine, Michigan, Minnesota, Mississippi, Missouri, Montana, Nebraska, New Hampshire, North Dakota, Oklahoma, Oregon, Rhode Island, South Dakota, Vermont, West Virginia, Wisconsin and Wyoming.

==== First qualifying round ====
The first qualifying round matches were played on September 9 and 10. 67 clubs will get First qualifying Round Byes.

September 9	SF Vikings SC (SFSFL) (California)	0–1	(California) Inter San Francisco (SFSFL)	San Francisco, CA
11:00 a.m. PDT		Report	Dylan Montgomery 30'	Stadium: Beach Chalet Soccer Field

September 9	DCFC (DCPL) (Washington, D.C.)	1–0	(Maryland) MoCo 1776 FC (UPSL)	Washington, D.C.
5:30 p.m. EDT	Andrew Dane 25'; Theodore Hooker (yellow card) (yellow-red card)	Report		Stadium: The Fields at RFK

September 9	VA Revolution Pro (UPSL) (Virginia)	1–4	(Washington, D.C.) Aegean Hawks (APL)	Leesburg, VA
7:00 p.m. EDT		Report		Stadium: Virginia Revolution Sportsplex

September 9	Marin County Union SC (NSL) (California)	1–5	(California) Olympic Club (SFSFL)	Sonoma, CA
5:00 p.m. PDT	53' (pen.)	Report	Alex Weekes 5'; Kyle Henderson 25', 33'; Ayala Hill 40'	Stadium: Sonoma Valley High School

September 9	Valley 559 FC (UPSL) (California)	2–0	(California) Real San Jose (NSL)	Fresno, CA
5:00 p.m. PDT	Juan Flores; Gabriel Monteiro	Report		Stadium: Keith Tice Memorial Park

September 9	Alamo City Soccer Club (UPSL) (Texas)	4–0	(Texas) Central Texas Lobos (GCPL)	San Antonio, Texas
7:00 p.m. CDT		Report		Stadium: Alamo Sportsplex

September 9	Lansdowne Yonkers (EPSL) (New York (state))	3–0	(Connecticut) Ole Football Club (UPSL)	Yonkers, NY
8:00 p.m. EDT	Daryl Kavanagh 30'; Shaqille Saunchez 37'; Steven Nolan 66'	Report		Stadium: Tibbetts Brooke Park

September 9	Hurricane FC (GCPL) (Florida)	2–4	(Florida) O'Shea's FC (USSL)	Delray Beach, FL
8:00 p.m. EDT		Report	Ash Morrisey 6'; Johnny Schmilliguen 38'; Nick Sowers	Stadium: Seacrest Soccer Complex

September 9	Bellevue Athletic FC (UPSL) (Washington (state))	2–2 (a.e.t.) (4–5 p)	(Washington (state)) Holac FC (UPSL)	Bellevue, WA
7:00 p.m. PDT		Report		Stadium: Bellevue College Soccer Field

September 9	Laguna United FC (UPSL) (California)	1–4	(California) Capo FC (NISAN)	Laguna Niguel, CA
7:00 p.m. PDT		Report		Stadium: La Paz Sports Park

September 9	JASA RWC (NISAN) (California)	2–6	(California) Bay Area United FC (NISAN)	Redwood City, CA
7:45 p.m. PDT		Report		Stadium: Red Morton Community Park

September 10	Harpos FC (CPL) (Colorado)	2–1	(Colorado) Colorado Rovers (CPL)	Broomfield, CO
1:00 p.m. MDT		Report		Stadium: Broomfield Commons Soccer Fields

September 10	Peak Eleven Football Club (MPL) (Colorado)	0–7	(Colorado) Azteca FC (CPL)	Boulder, CO
2:00 p.m. MDT		Report		Stadium: Fairview High School Field

September 10	BattleBorn FC (NISAN) (Nevada)	2–3	(California) FC Folsom (UPSL)	Reno, NV
2:00 p.m. PDT		Report		Stadium: Damonte High School

September 10	Philadelphia Heritage SC (EPSL) (Pennsylvania)	3–3 (a.e.t.) (3–0 p)	(Pennsylvania) Kensington Soccer Club (EPSL)	Conshohocken, PA
5:00 p.m. EDT		Report		Stadium: Proving Grounds

September 10	New York Pancyprian-Freedoms (EPSL) (New York (state))	1–0	(New York (state)) New York Braveheart SC (UPSL)	Jamaica, NY
7:00 p.m. EDT		Report		Stadium: Belson Stadium

September 10	Dade County FC (UPSL) (Florida)	1–4	(Florida) Miami Soccer Academy (USSL)	Pembroke Pines, FL
7:00 p.m. EDT		Report		Stadium: UPSL Stadium

September 10	Irvine Zeta FC (UPSL) (California)	3–1	(California) Irvine FC (UPSL)	Irvine, CA
5:00 p.m. PDT		Report		Stadium: Orange County Great Park

September 10	Manhattan Kickers FC (CSL) (New York (state))	0–5	(New York (state)) NY Renegades FC (UPSL)	New York, NY
8:00 p.m. EDT		Report		Stadium: Randall's Island Wards Meadow Fields

September 10	Zum Schneider FC 03 (EPSL) (New York (state))	3–1	(New York (state)) New York Greek Americans SC (EPSL)	New York, NY
8:00 p.m. EDT		Report		Stadium: Jack McManus Field

September 10	UC Davis Club Soccer (WCSA) (California)	7–1	(California) Elk Grove Blues (UPSL)	Davis, CA
7:00 p.m. PDT		Report		Stadium: Dairy Outdoor Recreation Complex

- Byes: Arlington SA, Athletic Katy FC, Austin Longhorns, Austin Thunder, Berber City FC, Boston Street FC, Brockton FC United, CD Faialense, CFL GOSA Spurs, Chargers Soccer Club, Chicago House AC, Chicago Strikers, Christos FC, City Soccer FC, Colonial SC, Coronado Athletic Club, Daggers CTX, Deportivo Lake Mary FC, Edgewater Castle Football Club, Escondido FC, FC Birmingham, FC Denver, FC Omens, Florida Brothers, Florida Premier FC, Foro SC, Harbor City FC, Hodler Miami FC, Houston FC, IASC Boom, Kalonji Pro-Profile, Leg-AZ World FC, Majestic Soccer Club, Miami United FC, Mint Hill FC, Murrieta Soccer Academy, New Jersey Alliance FC, North Georgia United, NoVa FC, Orlando FC Wolves, Parkland Soccer Club, Philadelphia Ukrainian Nationals, Provo Athletic Club, Real Center NJ Soccer, Rebels SC, Royal Palms Soccer Club, Sahara Gunners FC, Santa Monica Surf, SC Union Maricopa, SC Vistula Garfield, Sharktopus Football Club, Soccer Paradise FC, South Carolina United Heat, Sporting Arizona FC, Steel Pulse FC, Temecula Football Club, Tenfifteen FC, Tennessee Tempo FC, Terminus FC, Trojans FC, UDA Soccer, United German Hungarians, Valhalla FC, Vereinigung Erzgebirge, Villarreal CF Virginia, Wisloka Chicago, Yinz United

==== Second qualifying round ====
The second qualifying round matches were played on September 30 and October 1 & 3, 2023.

September 30	Houston FC (USSL) (Texas)	3–4	(Texas) Athletic Katy FC (USSL)	Houston, TX
1:00 P.M. CDT		Report		Stadium: San Jacinto College South Campus Soccer Field

September 30	Chicago House AC (MWPL) (Illinois)	2–1	(Illinois) Wisloka Chicago (UPSL)	Chicago, IL
1:00 p.m. CDT		Report		Stadium: DePaul College Prep

September 30	Vereinigung Erzgebirge (USLP) (Pennsylvania)	3–0	(Pennsylvania) Philadelphia Heritage SC (EPSL)	Warminster, PA
2:00 p.m. EDT		Report		Stadium: Vereinigung Erzgebirge Clubhouse

September 30	Azteca FC (CPL) (Colorado)	2–1	(Colorado) Harpos FC (CPL)	Goldon, CO
1:00 P.M. MDT		Report		Stadium: Victoria Sports Park

September 30	Villarreal CF Virginia (UPSL) (Virginia)	2–13	(Maryland) Steel Pulse FC (MSSL)	Falls Church, VA
3:00 p.m. EDT		Report		Stadium: Justice High School

September 30	Arlington SA (UPSL) (Virginia)	2–3	(Washington, D.C.) Yinz United (APL)	Arlington, VA
6:30 p.m. EDT		Report		Stadium: Wakefield High School

September 30	Mint Hill FC (UPSL) (North Carolina)	1–6	South Carolina United Heat (UPSL)	Mint Hill, NC
7:00 p.m. EDT		Report		Stadium: Mint Hill Veterans Memorial Park

September 30	Leg-AZ World FC (UPSL) (Florida)	8–1	(Florida) Royal Palms Soccer Club (UPSL)	Summerfield, FL
7:00 p.m. EDT		Report		Stadium: The Villages SC Complex

September 30	Florida Premier FC (UPSL)	4–0	(Florida) Clearwater Chargers SC (UPSL)	Trinity, FL
7:00 p.m. EDT		Report		Stadium: GSports Clubhouse Field

September 30	Valley 559 FC (UPSL) (California)	4–1	(California) Bay Area United FC (NISAN)	Fresno, CA
4:00 P.M. PDT		Report		Stadium: Keith Tice Memorial Park

September 30	Orlando FC Wolves (USSL) (Florida)	1–2	(Florida) Harbor City FC (UPSL)	Sanford, FL
7:00 p.m. EDT		Report		Stadium: Sylvan Lake Park

September 30	Hodler Miami FC (USSL) (Florida)	2–3	(Florida) City Soccer FC (USSL)	Pembroke Pines, FL
7:30 p.m. EDT		Report		Stadium: UPSL Stadium

September 30	Austin Thunder (AMSA) (Texas)	4–1	(Texas) Daggers CTX (GCPL)	Round Rock, TX
7:30 p.m. CDT		Report		Stadium: Round Rock Multipurpose Complex

September 30	Edgewater Castle Football Club (MWPL) (Illinois)	2–1	(Illinois) Berber City FC (MWPL)	Chicago, IL
8:00 p.m. CDT		Report		Stadium: Fire Pitch

September 30	Inter San Francisco (SFSFL) (California)	4–1	(California) Olympic Club (SFSFL)	San Francisco, CA
6:00 P.M. PDT		Report		Stadium: Beach Chalet Soccer Field

September 30	Temecula FC (NISAN) (California)	4–0	(California) Murrieta Soccer Academy (UPSL)	Temecula, CA
7:00 p.m. PDT		Report		Stadium: Chaparral High School

September 30	Santa Monica Surf (UPSL) (California)	7–1	(California) Trojans FC (UPSL)	Lake Forrest, CA
7:00 p.m. PDT		Report		Stadium: Lake Forrest Sports Complex

October 1	Terminus FC (ADASL) (Georgia (U.S. state))	0–4	(Georgia (U.S. state)) Kalonji Pro-Profile (UPSL)	Dunwoody, GA
10:00 a.m. EDT		Report		Stadium: Brook Run Park Soccer Fields

October 1	Majestic Soccer Club (ADASL) (Georgia (U.S. state))	6–1	(Georgia (U.S. state)) North Georgia United (UPSL)	Atlanta, GA
11:00 a.m. EDT		Report		Stadium: Booker T. Washington High School

October 1	FC Omens (BSSL) (Massachusetts)	0–3	(Massachusetts) Brockton FC United (UPSL)	Boston, MA
12:00 p.m. EDT		Report		Stadium: Madison Park High School

October 1	Colonial SC (USLPA) (Pennsylvania)	1–3 (a.e.t.)	(Pennsylvania) Philadelphia Ukrainians Nationals (USLPA)	Plymouth Meeting, PA
12:00 p.m. EDT		Report		Stadium: Plymouth-Whitemarsh High School

October 1	United German Hungarians (USLPA) (Pennsylvania)	6–0	(New Jersey) Real Central New Jersey (EPSL)	Ambler, PA
2:30 p.m. EDT		Report		Stadium: Temple University Ambler Campus

October 1	UDA Soccer (UPSL) (New Mexico)	2–1	(Arizona) Coronado Athletic Club (UPSL)	Las Cruces, NM
1:00 p.m. MDT		Report		Stadium: New Mexico State University

October 1	Sahara Gunners FC (UPSL) (New York (state))	2–1	(New York (state)) IASC Boom (RDSL)	Buffalo, NY
3:00 p.m. EDT		Report		Stadium: Dobson Field

October 1	SC Union Maricopa (UPSL) (Arizona)	1–2	Sporting Arizona FC (SWPL)	Glendale, AZ
3:00 p.m. PDT		Report		Stadium: Matt O. Hanhila Field

October 1	Valhalla FC (OVPL) (Ohio)	2–0	(Illinois) Chicago Strikers (UPSL)	Milford, OH
4:00 p.m. EDT		Report		Stadium: Charity J. Lucas Multi-Purpose Athletic Complex

October 1	Austin Longhorns (AMSA) (Texas)	L–W (forfeit)	(Texas) Alamo City Soccer Club (UPSL)	Austin, TX
5:00 p.m. CDT		Report		Stadium: Onion Creek Soccer Complex

October 1	FC Birmingham (UPSL) (Alabama)	1–4	Tennessee Tempo FC (UPSL)	Birmingham, AL
5:00 p.m. CDT		Report		Stadium: Birmingham-Southern College

October 1	DCFC (DCPL) (Washington, D.C.)	1–4	(Virginia) NoVa FC (EPSL)	Washington, D.C.
5:00 p.m. EDT		Report		Stadium: The Fields at RFK

October 1	Florida Brothers (USSL) (Florida)	0–9	(Florida) Miami Soccer Academy (USSL)	Fort Lauderdale, FL
6:00 p.m. EDT		Report		Stadium: Mills Pond Park

October 1	Foro SC (UPSL) (Texas)	2–0	(Texas) Tenfifteen FC (UPSL)	Dallas, TX
7:00 p.m. CDT		Report		Stadium: FORO Sports Complex

October 1	Boston Street FC (UPSL) (Massachusetts)	2–2 (a.e.t.) (1–2 p)	(Massachusetts) CD Faialense (BSSL)	Revere, MA
7:00 p.m. EDT		Report		Stadium: Harry Della Russo Memorial Stadium

October 1	New Jersey Alliance FC (UPSL)	2–0	(New Jersey) SC Vistula Garfield (GSSL)	Clifton, NJ
7:00 p.m. EDT		Report		Stadium: Anzaldi Park

October 1	Deportivo Lake Mary FC (UPSL) (Florida)	0–8	(Florida) FC America CFL Spurs (UPSL)	Lake Mary, FL
7:00 p.m. EDT		Report		Stadium: Lake Mary High School

October 1	NY Renegades FC (UPSL) (New York (state))	3–1	(New York (state)) Zum Schneider FC 03 (EPSL)	Hicksville, NY
7:30 p.m. EDT		Report		Stadium: Cantiague Park

October 1	Soccer Paradise FC (USSL) (Florida)	0–9	(Florida) Miami United FC (USSL)	North Miami, FL
7:30 p.m. EDT		Report		Stadium: Ronald L Book Athletic Stadium

October 1	New York Pancyprian-Freedoms (EPSL) (New York (state))	2–1	(New York (state)) Lansdowne Yonkers (EPSL)	Jamaica, NY
8:00 p.m. EDT		Report		Stadium: Belson Stadium

October 1	FC Denver (CPL) (Colorado)	3–2	(Utah) Provo Athletic Club (UPSL)	Denver, CO
6:30 p.m. MDT		Report		Stadium: Northfield High School

October 1	Rebels Soccer Club (UPSL) (California)	0–2	(California) Escondido FC (UPSL)	Spring Valley, CA
6:00 p.m. PDT		Report		Stadium: Mount Miguel High School

October 1	Sharktopus Football Club (RATS) (Washington (state))	2–1	(Washington (state)) Holac FC (UPSL)	Seattle, WA
4:00 p.m. PDT		Report		Stadium: Interbay Stadium

October 1	FC Folsom (UPSL) (California)	2–1	(California) UC Davis Club Soccer (WCSA)	Fresno, CA
5:00 p.m. PDT		Report		Stadium: Livermore Community Park;

October 1	Irvine Zeta FC (UPSL) (California)	6–0	(California) Capo FC (NISAN)	Irvine, CA
5:00 p.m. PDT		Report		Stadium: Orange County Great Park

October 1	Aegean Hawks (APL) (Washington, D.C.)	0–5	(Maryland) Christos FC (MSSL)	McLean, VA
8:00 p.m. EDT		Report		Stadium: Langley High School

October 3	O'Shea's FC (USSL) (Florida)	0–2	(Florida) Parkland Soccer Club (UPSL)	West Palm Beach, FL
6:30 p.m. EDT		Report		Stadium: Gaines Park

==== Third qualifying round ====
The third qualifying round matches were played on October 21 & 22, 2023.

October 21	CD Faialense (BSSL) (Massachusetts)	2–3	(Massachusetts) Brockton FC United (UPSL)	Winthrop, MA
10:00 a.m. EDT		Report		Stadium: Miller Field

October 21	Sharktopus Football Club (RATS) (Washington (state))	2–4	(California) Inter San Francisco (SFSFL)	Seattle, WA
10:00 a.m. PDT		Report		Stadium: Interbay Stadium

October 21	United German Hungarians (USLPA) (Pennsylvania)	1–1 (a.e.t.) (3–4 p)	(Pennsylvania) Vereinigung Erzgebirge (USLP)	Warminster Township, PA
2:00 p.m. EDT		Report		Stadium: Vereinigung Erzgebirge Clubhouse

October 21	Harbor City FC (UPSL) (Florida)	0–1	(Florida) FC America CFL Spurs (UPSL)	Melbourne, FL
7:00 p.m. EDT		Report		Stadium: World Roofing Stadium

October 21	Leg-AZ World FC (UPSL) (Florida)	4–0	(Florida) Florida Premier FC (UPSL)	Summerfield, FL
7:00 p.m. EDT		Report		Stadium: The Villages SC Complex

October 21	Miami United FC (USSL) (Florida)	4–0	(Florida) Miami Soccer Academy (USSL)	Hialeah, FL
7:00 p.m. EDT		Report		Stadium: Ted Hendricks Stadium

October 21	Athletic Katy FC (USSL) (Texas)	L–W forfeit	(Texas) Foro SC (UPSL)	Richmond, TX
7:00 p.m. CDT		Report		Stadium: George Bush High School
Note: Forfeit due to lack of eligible players at game

October 21	Austin Thunder (AMSA) (Texas)	1–2	(Texas) Alamo City Soccer Club (UPSL)	Round Rock, TX
7:30 p.m. CDT		Report		Stadium: Round Rock Multipurpose Complex

October 21	Edgewater Castle Football Club (MWPL) (Illinois)	1–3	(Illinois) Chicago House AC (MWPL)	Chicago, IL
7:30 p.m. CDT		Report		Stadium: William Howard Taft High School

October 21	Temecula FC (NISAN) (California)	3–1	(California) Santa Monica Surf (UPSL)	Temecula, CA
7:00 p.m. PDT		Report		Stadium: Chaparral High School

October 22	Philadelphia Ukrainians Nationals (USLPA) (Pennsylvania)	0–6	New Jersey Alliance FC (UPSL)	North Wales, PA
2:00 p.m. EDT				Stadium: Ukrainian American Sports Center (Field 6)

October 22	Sahara Gunners FC (UPSL) (New York (state))	1–10	(Ohio) Valhalla FC (OVPL)	Buffalo, NY
3:00 p.m. EDT				Stadium: Crosby Soccer Field

October 22	UDA Soccer (UPSL) (New Mexico)	W–L forfeit	(Arizona) Sporting Arizona FC (SWPL)	Las Cruces, NM
12:00 p.m. PDT				Stadium: New Mexico State University

October 22	Steel Pulse FC (MSSL) (Maryland)	1–1 (a.e.t.) (4–5 p)	(Maryland) Christos FC (MSSL)	Milford Mill, MD
4:00 p.m. EDT				Stadium: Milford Mill Academy

October 22	South Carolina United Heat (UPSL)	4–0	(Georgia (U.S. state)) Majestic Soccer Club (ADASL)	Columbia, SC
5:00 p.m. EDT				Stadium: SCUFC SEFL Soccer Center

October 22	Parkland Soccer Club (UPSL) (Florida)	0–2	(Florida) City Soccer FC (USSL)	Parkland, FL
6:00 p.m. EDT				Stadium: Terramar Park

October 22	Escondido FC (UPSL) (California)	1–1 (a.e.t.) (9–10 p)	(California) Irvine Zeta FC (UPSL)	Escondido, CA
3:30 p.m. PDT				Stadium: San Pasqual High School

October 22	Kalonji Pro-Profile (UPSL) (Georgia (U.S. state))	0–2	Tennessee Tempo FC (UPSL)	Snellville, GA
7:00 p.m. EDT				Stadium: Shiloh High School

October 22	Yinz United (APL) (Washington, D.C.)	1–2	(Virginia) NoVa FC (EPSL)	Vienna, VA
8:00 p.m. EDT				Stadium: Oakton High School

October 22	FC Folsom (UPSL) (California)	5–3	(California) Valley 559 FC (UPSL)	Fresno, CA
5:00 p.m. PDT				Stadium: Livermore Community Park

October 22	New York Pancyprian-Freedoms (EPSL) (New York (state))	3–0	(New York (state)) NY Renegades FC (UPSL)	Jamaica, NY
8:00 p.m. EDT				Stadium: Belson Stadium
Note: Abandoned in the 75th minute due to player threatening referee

October 22	FC Denver (CPL) (Colorado)	0–2	(Colorado) Azteca FC (CPL)	Denver, CO
6:30 p.m. MDT				Stadium: Northfield High School

==== Fourth qualifying round ====
The fourth qualifying round matches were played on November 18 & 19, 2023.

November 18	UDA Soccer (UPSL) (New Mexico)	1–2	(Colorado) Azteca FC (CPL)	Las Cruces, NM
1:00 p.m. MST		Report		Stadium: New Mexico State University

November 18	Valhalla FC (OVPL) (Ohio)	1–3	(Illinois) Chicago House AC (MWPL)	Milford, OH
3:00 p.m. EST		Report		Stadium: Charity Lucas Soccer Stadium

November 18	NoVa FC (EPSL) (Virginia)	0–1	(Maryland) Christos FC (MSSL)	Leesburg, VA
7:00 p.m. EST		Report		Stadium: Segra Field

November 18	FC America CFL Spurs (UPSL) (Florida)	4–1	(Florida) Leg-AZ World FC (UPSL)	Lake Mary, FL
7:00 p.m. EST				Stadium: Lake Mary High School

November 18	Foro SC (UPSL) (Texas)	4–0	(Texas) Alamo City Soccer Club (UPSL)	Carrollton, TX
7:00 p.m. CST		Report		Stadium: Prince of Peace

November 18	Tennessee Tempo FC (UPSL) (Tennessee)	2–4	South Carolina United Heat (UPSL)	Murfreesboro, TN
7:00 p.m. CST		Report		Stadium: Richard Siegel Soccer Complex

November 18	New York Pancyprian-Freedoms (EPSL) (New York (state))	1–3	(Massachusetts) Brockton FC United (UPSL)	Jamaica, NY
8:00 p.m. EST		Report		Stadium: Belson Stadium

November 19	Vereinigung Erzgebirge (USLP) (Pennsylvania)	0–0 (a.e.t.) (4–2 p)	(New Jersey) New Jersey Alliance FC (UPSL)	Warminster Township, PA
2:00 p.m. EST		Report		Stadium: Vereinigung Erzgebirge Clubhouse

November 19	Miami United FC (USSL) (Florida)	3–1	(Florida) City Soccer FC (USSL)	Hialeah, FL
7:00 p.m. EST		Report		Stadium: Ted Hendricks Stadium

November 19	FC Folsom (UPSL) (California)	4–2	(California) Inter San Francisco (SFSFL)	Fresno, CA
5:00 p.m. PST		Report		Stadium: Livermore Community Park;

November 19	Irvine Zeta FC (UPSL) (California)	3–1	(California) Temecula FC (NISAN)	Irvine, CA
5:00 p.m. PST		Report		Stadium: Orange County Great Park
