= Francis Castillo =

Salvadoran footballer

Personal information
- Full name: Francis Antonio Castillo-Orellana
- Date of birth: 7 November 2005 (age 21)
- Place of birth: Northampton, United States
- Height: 1.80 m (5 ft 11 in)
- Position: Forward

Team information
- Current team: Alianza
- Number: 17

Senior career*
Years	Team	Apps	(Gls)
2022	Allentown United	2	(2)
2022–2023	Esperança de Lagos	0	(0)
2023–2024	Philadelphia Union II	1	(0)
2024–2025	Cádiz B	3	(0)
2025	Antoniano	0	(0)
2026-	Alianza	17	(2)

International career^{‡}
2024	Nicaragua U20	8	(7)
2024–	El Salvador U20	3	(3)
2024–	El Salvador	6	(1)
- * Club domestic league appearances and goals as of 18:02, 19 September 2024 (UTC) ‡ National team caps and goals as of 18:02, 10 October 2024 (UTC)

Francisco Antonio Castillo-Orellana (born 7 November 2005) is a Salvadoran footballer who plays as a Forward for Alianza, and the El Salvador national team.

== Club career ==
Castillo began playing football at age six with Lehigh Valley United. As a youth, he also played for Allentown United FC and FC Delco in MLS Next before joining the academy of the Philadelphia Union of Major League Soccer.

In April 2022, Castillo made two appearances and scored two goals for Allentown United in the NISA Nation. At age sixteen, he joined C.F. Esperança de Lagos of the Campeonato de Portugal in August 2022. He returned to the United States and joined Philadelphia Union II of MLS Next Pro for the 2023 season. He made one appearance for the club, coming on as a late substitute in a match against Chicago Fire FC II on 18 June. . Later in 2023, Castillo was part of the International Soccer Academy team that integrated into the FC Schalke 04 youth system in Germany. He had further experience in the country with trials at 1. FC Köln and Werder Bremen. Following a trial in 2024, the player was signed to the academy of Cádiz CF. Despite signing in March, the player was cleared to play for the Spanish club in August 2024 following a lengthy visa process.

== International career ==
Castillo was born in Northampton, Pennsylvania, United States to parents from Nicaragua and El Salvador. He opted to play for Nicaragua in 2024 CONCACAF U-20 Championship qualifying. He went on to become the top scorer in qualification, tallying five goals and two assists over four matches.

Despite playing for Nicaragua in qualification, Castillo was part of the El Salvador under-20 squad for the 2024 CONCACAF U-20 Championship. After missing most of the tournament through injury, he returned and scored in the team's match against Canada to close out the Group stage. In April 2024, he decided to represent El Salvador at the senior level. He debuted for the nation on 6 June 2024 in a 2026 FIFA World Cup qualification match against Puerto Rico.

== Career statistics ==
=== International ===
As of match played 10 October 2024.

El Salvador national team
Year	Apps	Goals
2024	6	1
Total	6	1

As of match played 10 September 2024
El Salvador score listed first, score column indicates score after each Castillo goal

List of international goals scored by Francis Castillo
No.	Date	Venue	Cap	Opponent	Score	Result	Competition	Ref.
1	10 October 2024	Arnos Vale Stadium, Arnos Vale, Saint Vincent and the Grenadines	3	Saint Vincent and the Grenadines	3–2	3–2	2024–25 CONCACAF Nations League B	
