= 2025 NISA Nation season =

US soccer league season

NISA Nation
- Season: 2025
- Dates: Spring: March 29–July 26; Fall: August 23–December 20
- Matches: 110
- Goals: 502 (4.56 per match)
- Biggest home win: LA Force 2 12–0 Lobos FC (5/10); Temecula FC 12–0 Capo FC (6/14)
- Biggest away win: Lobos FC 0–9 Temecula FC (6/28)
- Highest scoring: Lobos FC 1–12 LA Force 2 (7/2)
- All statistics correct as of 18:39, November 24, 2025 (UTC).

The 2025 NISA Nation season was the fifth season of NISA Nation, a semi-professional 4th tier league in the United States soccer league system, and a feeder league to 3rd tier NISA.

The 2025 season was expected to be played across 8 regions: Arkansas/Tennessee, Coast, Colorado, Michigan, North Texas, Pacific, South Texas, and Southwest. On March 31, NISA Nation announced that spring season would only consist of the Coast and Southwest Region.

== Spring Teams ==
=== Coast Region ===
Team	City	Stadium
Capo FC	San Juan Capistrano, California	JSerra Catholic High School
Inland Empire FC	San Bernardino, California	
LA Force 2	Long Beach, California	Veterans Memorial Stadium
Lobos FC	West Covina, California	
Temecula FC	Temecula, California	Chaparral High School
Problems FC	Long Beach, California	

=== Southwest Region ===
Team	City	Stadium
FC Anahuac	Las Vegas, Nevada	Western High School
Be Pro FC	Las Vegas, Nevada	Freedom Park
LV United FC	Las Vegas, Nevada	
Sin City FC	Las Vegas, Nevada	
Soccer Academy Nevada	Las Vegas, Nevada	Cimarron-Memorial High School
STG Premier Pro	St. George, Utah	Pine View High School
SC Union Maricopa	Gilbert, Arizona	Sun Devil Soccer Stadium

== Spring Season ==
=== Regular season ===
==== Coast Region ====
===== Standings =====
Pos	Team	Pld	W	D	L	GF	GA	GD	Pts	Qualification
1	LA Force 2	10	8	1	1	51	12	+39	25	Qualification for Pacific Final
2	Capo FC	10	6	2	2	32	32	0	20	
3	Worldwide Problems FC	10	5	2	3	32	24	+8	17	
4	Temecula FC	10	3	3	4	38	24	+14	12	
5	Real Sociedad U23	10	3	2	5	20	24	−4	11	
6	Lobos FC	10	0	0	10	8	62	−54	0	

Updated to match(es) played on July 26, 2025. Source: https://nisanation.com/table

===== Results =====
Home \ Away	CAP	IEF	LAF	LOB	TEM	WPF
Capo FC	—	5–2	1–4	3–0	3–2	1–3
Real Sociedad U23	2–2	—	0–4	5–2	4–1	0–3
LA Force 2	2–3	4–2	—	12–0	3–0	4–1
Lobos FC	2–9	0–3* (Note: Real Sociedad awarded forfeit win)	1–12	—	0–9	2–3
Temecula FC	1–1	3–2	3–3	12–0	—	3–5
Worldwide Problems FC	2–4	3–3	0–2	9–1	3–3	—

Updated to match(es) played on July 26, 2025. Source: https://nisanation.com/schedule
Legend: Blue = home team win; Yellow = draw; Red = away team win.

==== Southwest Region ====
===== Standings =====
Pos	Team	Pld	W	D	L	GF	GA	GD	Pts	Qualification
1	Sin City FC	12	11	0	1	44	15	+29	33	Qualification for Southwest Final
2	STG Premier Pro	12	6	1	5	25	18	+7	19	
3	SC Union Maricopa	12	6	1	5	25	25	0	19	
4	FC Anahuac	12	5	2	5	27	31	−4	17	
5	LV United FC	12	5	1	6	20	22	−2	16	
6	Soccer Academy Nevada	12	4	1	7	14	24	−10	13	
7	Be Pro FC	12	2	0	10	23	35	−12	6	

Updated to match(es) played on July 12, 2025. Source: https://nisanation.com/table

===== Results =====
Home \ Away	FCA	BPF	LVU	SCF	SAN	STG	SUM
FC Anahuac	—	3–1	3–3	2–3	2–2	4–3	3–0
Be Pro FC	3–4	—	0–2	2–3	1–2	3–6	5–3
LV United FC	4–0	2–4	—	0–5	4–0	2–1	3–0
Sin City FC	4–2	3–1	7–3	—	6–2	3–0 (Note: Sin City awarded forfeit win)	5–1
Soccer Academy Nevada	1–3	2–1	3–0	0–3	—	0–1	1–0
STG Premier Pro	4–1	5–0	5–1	0–4	2–0	—	1–1
SC Union Maricopa	3–0	5–2	2–1	2–1	5–1	3–2	—

Updated to match(es) played on July 12, 2025. Source: https://nisanation.com/schedule
Legend: Blue = home team win; Yellow = draw; Red = away team win.

==== West Regional Playoff ====
Finals
CA	LA Force 2	2
NV	Sin City FC	0

==== Tennessee Region ====
===== Standings =====
Pos	Team	Pld	W	D	L	GF	GA	GD	Pts	Qualification
1	Nashville Knights FC	8	8	0	0	23	4	+19	24	Qualification for Southwest Final
2	Dream FC	8	3	1	4	19	8	+11	10	Qualification for Southwest Final
3	Paul Depay FC	8	3	1	4	18	15	+3	10	
4	Music City Soccer Club	8	3	0	5	4	28	−24	9	
5	FK Han	8	2	0	6	12	21	−9	6	

Updated to match(es) played on July 8, 2025. Source: https://nisanation.com/table

===== Results =====
Home \ Away	DRE	FKH	MSS	NKF	PDF
Dream FC	—	0–3 (Note: FK Han awarded forfeit win)	0–3 (Note: Music City Soccer Club awarded forfeit win)	1–2	3–1
FK Han	2–9	—	4–1	1–2	2–3
Music City Soccer Club	0–6	3–0 (Note: Music City Soccer Club awarded forfeit win)	—	0–7	2–7
Nashville Knights FC	3–0	3–0 (Note: Nashville Knights FC awarded forfeit win)	4–1	—	3–0 (Note: Nashville Knights FC awarded forfeit win)
Paul Depay FC	0–0 (Note: Both teams forfeit match)	6–3	0–3 (Note: Music City Soccer Club awarded forfeit win)	1–5	—

Updated to match(es) played on July 8, 2025. Source: https://nisanation.com/schedule
Legend: Blue = home team win; Yellow = draw; Red = away team win.

== Fall Teams ==
=== Southwest Region ===
Team	City	Stadium
Capo FC	San Juan Capistrano, California	JSerra Catholic High School
LA Force 2	Long Beach, California	Veterans Memorial Stadium
Problems FC	Anaheim, California	
Sin City FC	Las Vegas, Nevada	
STG Premier Pro	St. George, Utah	Pine View High School
Temecula FC	Temecula, California	Chaparral High School

== Fall Season ==
=== Regular season ===
==== Standings ====
Pos	Team	Pld	W	D	L	GF	GA	GD	Pts
1	LA Force 2 (C)	8	6	2	0	21	7	+14	20
2	Capo FC	8	3	3	2	16	13	+3	12
3	Problems FC	8	3	1	4	11	16	−5	10
4	Sin City FC	8	3	0	5	18	19	−1	9
5	Temecula FC	8	1	2	5	6	17	−11	5

Updated to match(es) played on December 13, 2025. Source: https://nisanation.com/table
(C) Champions

===== Results =====
Home \ Away	CAP	LAF	PFC	SIN	TEM
Capo FC	—	1–1	1–3	4–1	3–3
LA Force 2	1–1	—	2–0	3–1	3–0
Problems FC	1–3	0–2	—	2–4	1–0
Sin City FC	3–0 (Note: forfeit)	4–5	2–3	—	2–0
Temecula FC	0–3	0–3	1–1	2–1	—

Updated to match(es) played on December 13, 2025. Source: https://nisanation.com/schedule
Legend: Blue = home team win; Yellow = draw; Red = away team win.

== See also ==
- NISA Nation
- National Independent Soccer Association
