= Albion SC =

Albion SC may refer to:

- Albion SC San Diego, an American soccer team
- Albion SC Delaware, an American soccer team
- Albion SC Las Vegas, an American soccer team
