= NISA Nation =

Semi-pro American soccer league

- Organizing body: NISA
- Founded: September 17, 2020; 6 years ago
- First season: 2021
- Country: United States
- Confederation: CONCACAF (North American Football Union)
- Divisions: 4
- Number of clubs: 22
- Domestic cup: U.S. Open Cup
- League cup: NISA Independent Cup
- International cup(s): CONCACAF Champions League (via U.S. Open Cup)
- Current champion(s): New York Greek American (1st title)
- Most championships: NoVa FC; New York Greek American (1 title each)
- Broadcaster(s): Eleven Sports
- Website: nisanation.com
- Current: 2025 NISA Nation season

NISA Nation is an amateur men's soccer league in the United States. The league is below the professional leagues in the United States soccer league system and began play in 2021. NISA Nation is affiliated with the former third tier professional league National Independent Soccer Association.

== History ==
The old logo.

On August 25, 2021, Atlantic City FC was announced as the first club of the newly formed league. Two weeks later, NISA Nation announced they had six teams for their inaugural season and they would play a 10-game schedule in the Northeast Region. This inaugural region included the leagues first promoted team, Steel Pulse FC from the Eastern Premier Soccer League. In October 2021, NISA Nation announced the start of a second region. The Southwest Region was started with four teams, each team playing six games in a round robin format. New Jersey Alliance FC beat New Amsterdam FC II 4–0 to secure the first regional championship for the Northeast Region. In early January 2022, FC Golden State Force claimed the first Southwest Region championship.

On January 6, 2022, it was announced that NISA Nation earned from the United States Adult Soccer Association the USASA provisional national league license, a license that gave recognition to the league and that opens the way to U.S. Open Cup spots directly from the league. The Florida Region was announced in the Spring of 2022, with five teams facing each other three times in the Orlando area. In addition to the Florida Region, NISA Nation announced that the Northeast Region's spring season would consist of eight clubs playing 10 games a piece. The defending champions New Jersey Alliance FC, returned to defend their title during the spring season. In May 2022, the Pacific Region was announced with four teams, playing a 12-game schedule. This brought the league to 23 teams for the Spring of 2022. Each region crowned a champion for the 2022 NISA Nation season. The four champions were Club De Lyon (Florida Region), New Jersey Alliance FC (Northeast Region), Battleborn FC (Pacific Region), and Capo FC (Southwest Region).

NISA Nation announced in early 2023 that the Southwest region would return for play in the spring with six clubs, including three previous clubs and three new clubs: AS Los Angeles, SC Union Maricopa, and Olympiacos CA. In early 2023, NISA Nation announced the addition of the Pacific Division for the spring, with five teams committed and ten teams planned. In July 2023, NISA Nation announced the formation of the Texas Region for fall 2023. For the fall of 2023, NISA Nation ran three regional leagues; Pacific, Southwest, and Texas Regions.

=== National Championship ===
In October 2023, NISA Nation announced that they would hold their inaugural National Championship, which would have three rounds to determine the national champions. Eligible to participate were the champions of the NISA Nation regions, as well as the champions of its affiliate leagues. The two finalists, Northern Virginia FC and Las Vegas Legends, were both invited to promote to the third-tier NISA. The inaugural Championship represented the first opportunity for merit-based promotion to the professional level in the United States soccer league system.

=== NISA Independent Cup ===
Teams from NISA Nation participated in the 36 team NISA Independent Cup in 2022.

=== U.S. Open Cup ===
Clubs in NISA Nation can qualify for the U.S. Open Cup through the local qualifying route. Capo FC and Club de Lyon are the only two teams to qualify for the tournament proper, which they both did in the 2023 U.S. Open Cup.

U.S. Open Cup Participation
| Year | Participating Team | Final Round | Ref. |
|---|---|---|---|
| 2023 | Battleborn FC | Fourth qualifying round | |
| 2023 | Capo FC | Second round | |
| 2023 | SC Union Maricopa | Second qualifying round | |
| 2023 | Club de Lyon | First round | |
| 2023 | Deportivo Lake Mary | First qualifying round | |
| 2024 | Battleborn FC (2) | First qualifying round | |
| 2024 | Bay Area United FC | Second qualifying round | |
| 2024 | Capo FC (2) | Second qualifying round | |
| 2024 | JASA RWC | First qualifying round | |
| 2024 | Temecula FC | Fourth qualifying round | |
| 2025 | Las Vegas Legends | Fourth qualifying round | |
| 2025 | Modesto City FC | Second qualifying round | |
| 2025 | Roc City Boom | Second qualifying round | |
| 2025 | Soccer Academy Nevada | Second qualifying round | |
| 2027 | Capo FC (3) | | |
| 2027 | Problems SC | | |
| 2027 | Sin City Football Club | | |

== Associations ==
NISA Nation is affiliated and plans to begin a pro-rel system with multiple leagues all over the country: the Cascadia Premier League in Washington and Oregon, the Mountain Premier League in the Rocky Mountains region, and the Southwest Premier League in the southwestern United States, the Gulf Coast Premier League in the deep south, the Pioneer Premier League in Tennessee and Kentucky, the Midwest Premier League in the states of Illinois, Michigan, Iowa, Wisconsin and Missouri. In 2023 reaffirmed their association with Cascadia Premier League, Mountain Premier League, and Southwest Premier League. This aligned all four leagues top division aside NISA Nation. This will continue to provide these leagues with slots in the NISA Independent Cup and began a new initiative that provided a national championship to be competed between NISA Nation Regional champions and league winners. In August 2023, NISA Nation announced the association with Florida Gold Coast League. In October 2023, NISA Nation announced their affiliation with Metroplex Premier League, an amateur league from North Texas. In February 2024, NISA Nation announced the Upstate New York Region as the fourth region for the 2024 Spring season. In January 2025, NISA Nation announced their plans for the 2025 season, which included continued affiliation for Cascadia Premier League, Metroplex Premier League, Mountain Premier League, and Southwest Premier League. In addition, NISA Nation announced that the Michigan Premier Lague would be a new affiliate for 2025.

| Level | League(s)/division(s) | | | | | |
|---|---|---|---|---|---|---|
| 3 | National Independent Soccer Association; 9 clubs | | | | | |
| 4 | NISA Nation; Coast Region | NISA Nation; Southwest Region | NISA Nation; Tennessee Arkansas Region | NISA Nation; North Texas Region | | |
| 5 | Cascadia Premier League | Southwest Premier League | | Metroplex Premier League | Michigan Premier League | Mountain Premier League |

=== Cascadia Premier League ===
| Level | League(s)/division(s) | | | |
|---|---|---|---|---|
| 5 | Cascadia Premier League Premier 1 Men's Premier League 1 - Baker Division; 5 clubs | Cascadia Premier League Premier 1 Men's Premier League 1 - Rainier Division; 5 clubs | | |
| 6 | | | Cascadia Premier League 2 Men's Premier 2 - Cascade Division; 5 clubs | Cascadia Premier League 2 Men's Premier 2 - Pacific Division; 4 clubs |

=== Metroplex Premier League ===
| Level | League(s)/division(s) |
|---|---|
| 5 | Metroplex Blue League; 8 clubs |
| 6 | Metroplex Red League; 10 clubs |

=== Michigan Premier League ===
| Level | League(s)/division(s) |
|---|---|
| 5 | Michigan Premier League; 6 clubs |
| 6 | Michigan Open League; 5 clubs |

=== Mountain Premier League ===
| Level | League(s)/division(s) |
|---|---|
| 5 | Mountain Premier League; 8 clubs |

=== Southwest Premier League ===
| Level | League(s)/division(s) | | | | | | |
|---|---|---|---|---|---|---|---|
| 5 | Arizona Premier League Men's Open Arizona; 5 clubs | San Diego Baja MX Premier League Men's Open San Diego; 5 clubs | Enhancement Premier League Men's Open | Nevada Premier League Men's Open Nevada; 6 clubs | Pacific Premier League Men's Open Pacific; 8 clubs | SoCal Premier League Men's Open SoCal; 10 clubs | |
| 6 | | | | | | SoCal Premier League Coast Division; 7 clubs | SoCal Premier League LA IE; 6 clubs |

== Current teams ==
=== Southwest Region ===
| Team | City | Stadium | Founded | First season |
|---|---|---|---|---|
| Capo FC | San Juan Capistrano, California | JSerra Catholic High School | 2006 | 2022 |
| LA Force 2 | Pomona, California | Rio Hondo College | 2015 | 2021 |
| Problems FC (Note: Previously played as Worldwide Problems FC) | Orange County, California | Chaparral High School | 2018 | 2024 |
| Sin City FC | Las Vegas, Nevada | Mater Academy East High School | | 2025 |
| STG Premier Pro | St. George, Utah | Pine View High School | | 2024 |

=== Location map ===
NISA Nation clubs
Coast Region; Southwest Region;

=== Former teams ===
| Team | City | Stadium | Founded | First season | Final season |
|---|---|---|---|---|---|
| Chula Vista FC | Chula Vista, California | Terra Nova Park | 1982 | 2021 | 2021 |
| New Amsterdam FC II | New York, New York | Orlin & Cohen Sports Complex | 2020 | 2021 | 2021 |
| New Jersey Teamsterz FC | Bayonne, New Jersey | Don Ahern Veterans Memorial Stadium | 2017 | 2021 | 2021 |
| Steel Pulse FC | Baltimore, Maryland | Blandair Regional Park West Playground | 2019 | 2021 | 2021 |
| Valley United FC U23 | Scottsdale, Arizona | GCU Stadium | 2020 | 2021 | 2021 |
| Athletico Orlando FC | Orlando, Florida | Northeast Regional Park | 2017 | 2022 | 2022 |
| Club de Lyon | Daytona Beach, Florida | Daytona Stadium | 2022 | 2023 | 2021 |
| Deportivo Lake Mary | Lake Mary, Florida | Lake Mary High School | 2017 | 2022 | 2021 |
| Inter United FC | Davenport, Florida | Feltrim Sports Complex | 1997 | 2022 | 2021 |
| Winter Haven United FC | Winter Haven, Florida | Feltrim Sports Complex | 2016 | 2022 | 2021 |
| Alloy Soccer Club | Lancaster, Pennsylvania | | | 2022 | 2022 |
| Aiolikos FC USA Rush | Boston, Massachusetts | Cawley Memorial Stadium | 1975 | 2022 | 2022 |
| Albion SC Delaware | Middletown, Delaware | DE Turf Sports Complex | 2020 | 2021 | 2022 |
| Allentown United FC | Allentown, Pennsylvania | Cedar Crest College | 2018 | 2022 | 2022 |
| Atlantic City FC | Atlantic City, New Jersey | Rowan University | 2017 | 2021 | 2022 |
| Boston Athletic SC | Boston, Massachusetts | Harry Della Russo Stadium | 2005 | 2022 | 2022 |
| New Jersey Alliance FC | Clifton, New Jersey | Newark Schools Stadium | 2012 | 2021 | 2022 |
| New York Braveheart SC | New York City, New York | Orlin and Cohen Sports Complex | 2022 | 2022 | 2022 |
| Union SC | Union Township, New Jersey | Volunteer Field | 1984 | 2022 | 2022 |
| AC Houston Sur | Richmond, Texas | Matias Almeyda Training Center | 2021 | 2023 | 2023 |
| AFC Solano | Fairfield, California | Armijo High School | 2020 | 2022 | 2023 |
| AFC South Bay | San Jose, California | Watson Park Soccer Fields | 2021 | 2022 | 2023 |
| FC Dallas Dynamo | Dallas, Texas | | 2021 | 2023 | 2023 |
| JASA FWC FC | Redwood City, California | Red Morton Park | 1999 | 2023 | 2023 |
| Lions United FC | Montrose, California | Glendale Sports Complex | 2021 | 2023 | 2023 |
| Lobos FC | West Covina, California | Hovley Soccer Park | 2016 | 2023 | 2023 |
| Matias Almeyda FC | Houston, Texas | Matias Almeyda Training Center | 2019 | 2023 | 2023 |
| Oaks FC | Thousand Oaks, California | California Lutheran University | 1979 | 2022 | 2023 |
| Ocelot FC | Colton, California | Colton High School Stadium | 2021 | 2023 | 2023 |
| Ocelot Stockton TLJ FC | Stockton, California | Edison High School | 2021 | 2023 | 2023 |
| San Francisco Elite Metro FC | San Francisco, California | Negoesco Stadium | 2017 | 2022 | 2023 |
| San Francisco Elite Metro FC | San Francisco, California | Negoesco Stadium | 2017 | 2022 | 2023 |
| Sporting ID11 | Lake Forest, California | Lake Forest Sports Complex | 2021 | 2022 | 2023 |
| Texas Premier | Houston, Texas | | 2016 | 2023 | 2023 |
| Windmill City FC | Stockton, California | | 2022 | 2023 | 2023 |
| Craq Intercontinental | Salton City, California | West Shores High School | 2022 | 2024 | 2024 |
| Desert FC | La Quinta, California | Hovley Soccer Park | 2020 | 2023 | 2024 |
| SC Union Maricopa | Phoenix, Arizona | Andess High School | 2020 | 2022 | 2024 |
| Temecula FC | Temecula, California | Chaparral High School | 2013 | 2023 | 2025 |

== Champions ==
=== National Championship ===
| Season | Champion | Runner-up |
|---|---|---|
| 2023 | Northern Virginia FC (EPSL) | Las Vegas Legends |
| 2024 | New York Greek American (EPSL) | Worldwide Problems FC |

==== West Region Finals ====
| Season | Champion | Runner-up | Third | Fourth |
|---|---|---|---|---|
| Fall 2023 | Las Vegas Legends | FC Golden State Force | FC Brownsville | Peak XI FC (MPL) |
| Fall 2024 | Worldwide Problems FC | Las Vegas Legends | Peak XI FC (MPL) | Chula Vista FC (SWPL) |
| Spring 2025 | LA Force 2 | Sin City FC | | |

=== Season Results ===
| Region | Champion | Runner-up | Third place |
Spring 2021
| Northeast | New Jersey Alliance FC | New Amsterdam FC II | Steel Pulse FC |
Fall 2021
| Southwest | FC Golden State Force | Las Vegas Legends | Chula Vista FC |
Spring 2022
| Florida | Club de Lyon | Atletico Orlando | Deportivo Lake Mary |
| Northest | New Jersey Alliance FC (2) | Union SC | New York Braveheart |
| Pacific | Battleborn FC | AFC South Bay | San Francisco Elite Metro FC |
| Southwest | Capo FC | FC Golden State Force | Las Vegas Legends |
Spring 2023
| Pacific | Battleborn FC (2) | JASA RWC | Windmill City FC |
| Southwest | FC Golden State Force (2) | Temecula FC | Capo FC |
Fall 2023
| Pacific | Battleborn FC (3) | JASA RWC | Windmill City FC |
| Southwest | FC Golden State Force (3) | Temecula FC | Capo FC |
| Texas | FC Brownsville | Matias Almeyda FC | AC Houston Sur |
Spring 2024
| Pacific | Silicon Valley Rush | Bay Area United | Afghan Premier |
| Southwest | Las Vegas Legends | FC Golden State Force | Capo FC |
| Western NY | Roc City Boom | Binghamton FC | United Elite Krajisnik FC |
Fall 2024
| Coast | Worldwide Problems FC | Las Vegas Legends | FC Golden State Force |
| Pacific | Silicon Valley Rush (2) | Club Tepa | Afghan Premier |
Spring 2025
| Coast | LA Force 2 (4) (Note: Previous three championships as FC Golden State Force) | Capo FC | Worldwide Problems FC |
| Southwest | Sin City FC | STG Premier Pro | SC Union Maricopa |
| Tennessee | Nashville Knights FC | Dream FC | Paul Depay FC |
Fall 2025
| Southwest | LA Force 2 (5) | Capo FC | Worldwide Problems FC |
Spring 2026
| Southwest | LA Force 2 (6) | Sin City FC | Royal Society FC |

== Leadership ==
| Name | Years | Title | Ref. |
|---|---|---|---|
| John Prutch | 2022– | Commissioner | |
| Matt Morse | 2022– | Managing Director, Independent Cup, & Affiliates | |
| Kenneth Henriques | 2022– | Referee Coordinator | |
| Carlos Budyszewick | 2023– | Director of Expansion and Outreach | |
