= New Jersey Alliance FC =

- Full name: New Jersey Alliance Football Club
- Nicknames: NJAFC, Alliance
- Founded: 2012; 14 years ago
- Stadium: Athenia Steel Complex
- Owner: Edgar Guardia
- Manager: Robert Kruk
- League: NISA Nation
- Website: njalliancefc.com
Home colours	Away colours

New Jersey Alliance FC is an American soccer team based out of Lyndhurst, New Jersey. The team was founded in 2012 and plays in the NISA Nation, in the Northeast Region. NJAFC's colors are yellow, white and blue are the official colors.

== History ==
New Jersey Alliance FC were founded in 2012 by Edgar Guardia, a local entrepreneur from Lyndhurst, New Jersey. The club joined the Garden State Soccer League and later the UPSL by reaching the 5th tier of US soccer pyramid. On 27 August 2021 NISA Nation, a 4th tier league, announced that the team was going to join the league as founder club in the 2021 NISA Nation season. The team tried to qualify for the 2022 U.S. Open Cup but was eliminated by West Chester United SC. The club started 2021 NISA Nation season with a home win 16–0 over Bearfight FC.

== Organization ==
Was founded in 2012 as Lyndhurst Alliance FC.

At some point in time, the organization's name was changed to North Jersey Alliance FC, Lyndhurst, NJ.

On December 12, 2019: NORTH JERSEY ALLIANCE FC, EIN 82–2716932, of Lyndhurst, NJ received determination letter issued by the IRS for tax-exempt 501(c)(3) status, with effective date of exemption September 7, 2017.

On May 5, 2020, NORTH JERSEY ALLIANCE FC's tax-exempt status was revoked. "Organizations whose federal tax exempt status was automatically revoked for not filing a Form 990-series return or notice for three consecutive years."

On March 12, 2022, NEW JERSEY ALLIANCE FC, EIN: 87–4233669, of Lyndhurst, NJ received determination letter issued by the IRS for tax-exempt 501(c)(3) status, with effective date of exemption January 4, 2022.

== Year-by-year ==
As of September 15, 2025

Year	Tier	League	Region	Regular season	U.S. Open Cup
2021 Fall	4	NISA Nation	Northeast Region	1st place of 6	2nd Qualifying Round
2022 Spring	4	NISA Nation	Northeast Region	1st place of 8	N/A
2022 Fall	4	UPSL	Northeast – American	4th place of 13	1st Qualifying Round
2023 Spring	4	UPSL	Northeast – American	6th place of 12	N/A
2023 Fall	4	UPSL	Northeast – American	4th place of 13	4th Qualifying Round
2024 Spring	4	UPSL	Northeast – American (South)	1st place of 8	N/A
2024 Fall	4	UPSL	Northeast – American (South)	1st place of 7, Conference Semi-finals	Qualified for Final Tournament
2025 Spring	4	UPSL	Northeast – American (South)	3rd place of 9	First Round
2025 Fall	4	UPSL			1st Qualifying Round
2026 Fall	4	UPSL			3rd Qualifying Round

== History of NJ Alliance FC's Organization's Structure ==
2012: North Jersey Alliance Futbol Club (NJAFC), based out of Lyndhurst, NJ, was founded in 2012 by Edgar Guardia.

2019: North Jersey Alliance Fc of Lyndhurst, NJ, received their 501(c)(3) tax exempt status from the IRS under EIN 82–2716932.
