= Northern Virginia FC =

American soccer team

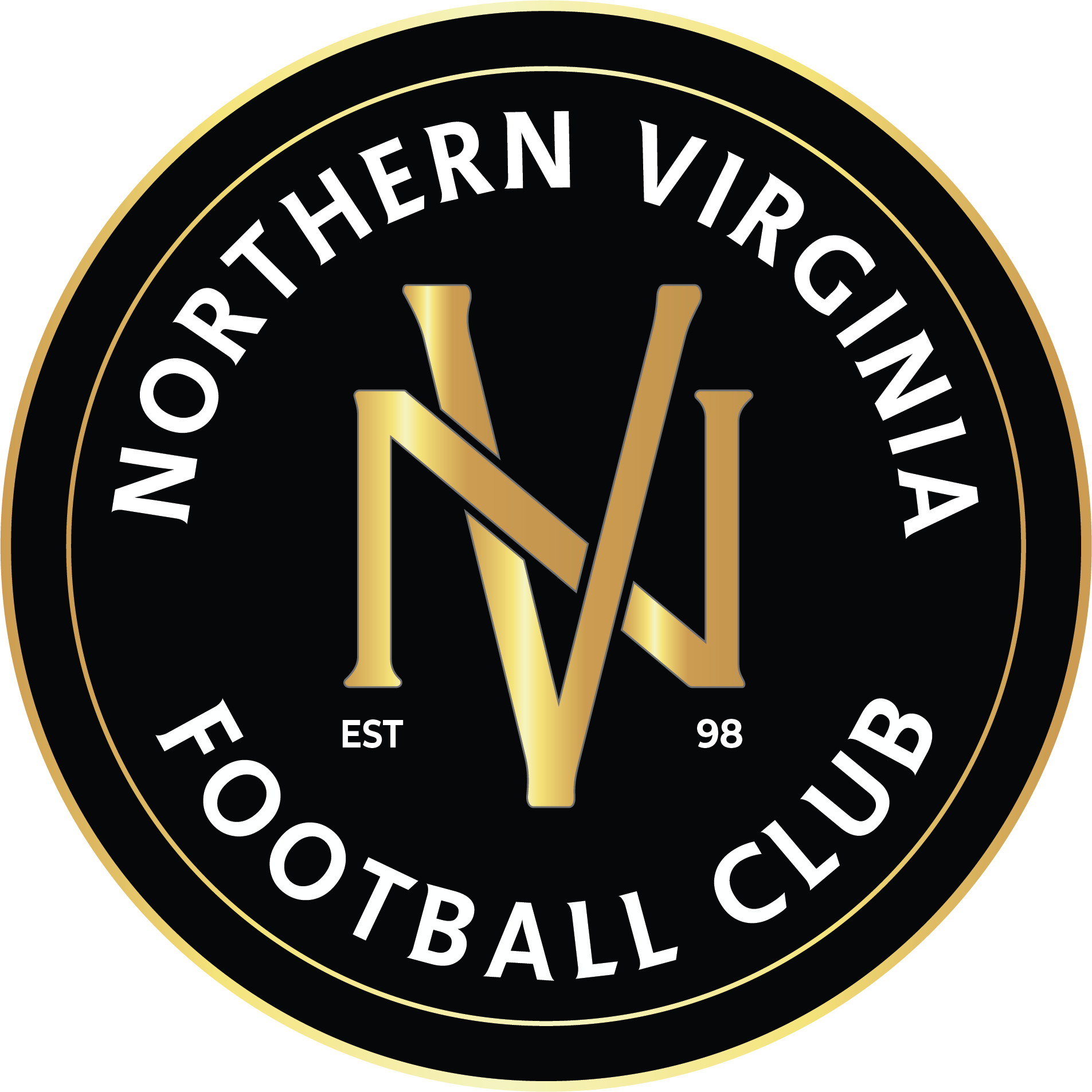
- Full name: Northern Virginia Football Club
- Founded: 1998; 28 years ago as Northern Virginia Royals
- Stadium: Segra Field; Leesburg, Virginia
- Capacity: 5,000
- League: USL League Two; USL W League; APSL; MASL3
- 2024: 4th, Chesapeake Division; Playoffs: DNQ
- Website: novafcalliance.club
Home colors	Away colors	Third colors

Northern Virginia FC (formerly Northern Virginia Royals and Evergreen FC, and commonly known as NoVa FC) is an American soccer club from Leesburg, Virginia competing in USL League Two, USL W League, American Premier Soccer League and Major Arena Soccer League 3.

The club's women's team was known as the Northern Virginia Majestics, who played in the women's USL W-League, and fielded a team in the USL's Super-20 League, a league for players 17 to 20 years of age run under the United Soccer Leagues umbrella. Throughout their recent history, NVFC previously enjoyed minor league affiliation with D.C. United, the nearby Major League Soccer franchise.

== History ==
=== Professional ===
Northern Virginia FC was founded in 1998 and joined the USISL D-3 Pro League as an expansion franchise in 1998, entering the team under the name Northern Virginia Royals. They ended their first season in 7th place in the Atlantic Division with a 5–12–1 record. In their second season, they improved, winning 10 of their 18 regular season games, finishing fourth in the Atlantic Division and also qualified for their first US Open Cup campaign in 1999, where they were upset in the first round by Florida PDL side Cocoa Expos 5–3. In the playoffs they beat divisional rivals South Carolina Shamrocks 2–1 in the first round before falling 4–0 to Charlotte in the conference semi-final. The 1998 season and the Royals were featured in the book "Unlucky: A Season of Struggle in Minor League Professional Soccer" by Dave Ungrady, who trained and played briefly for the Royals as well

The D-3 Pro League became the USL Pro Select League in 2003, and the Royals finished bottom of the 3-team Southern Division, with just 6 wins for the year. The USL Pro Select League became the USL Second Division in 2005, and dispensed with divisions in favor of a single-table format; for the Royals, this proved to be yet another disastrous season.

=== Move to PDL ===
After finishing bottom of the league in the USL Second Division, the Royals management took the decision to self-relegate themselves to the USL Premier Development League for the 2006 season. The Royals won their first match in the amateur PDL 3–1 over West Virginia Chaos, ultimately finishing fourth in the Mid Atlantic Division in their debut 2006 season.

The Northern Virginia Royals were inducted into the USL Soccer Hall of Fame in 2007.

=== Partnership with D.C. United ===
In 2015, the Royals rebranded as Evergreen FC and partnered with Major League Soccer club D.C. United and formed a joint PDL team called D.C. United U-23, who combined their NPSL side with the Royals, to play in the PDL, finishing fifth in the Mid-Atlantic Division.

=== Evergreen Hammers ===
After the 2015 season, the Royals transferred their operations and relocated to Loudon County, Virginia in 2016 playing under the Evergreen FC banner as the Evergreen Hammers.

=== Northern Virginia FC ===
For the 2021 season, Evergreen which was already part of the Northern Virginia FC club, renamed the USL League Two club to sit under the NoVa FC banner. NoVa FC had already operated teams under that name in the lower level United Premier Soccer League and American Premier Soccer League.

On 27 August 2021, NoVa FC announced they would be reviving the women's program with a new side in the USL W League beginning in 2022.

== Year-by-year ==
=== Professional/USL League Two ===
Year	Division	League	Regular season	Playoffs	U.S. Open Cup
Northern Virginia Royals
1998	3	USISL D-3 Pro League	7th, Atlantic	did not qualify	did not qualify
1999	3	USL D-3 Pro League	4th, Atlantic	Conference Semifinals	1st Round
2000	3	USL D-3 Pro League	7th, Southern	did not qualify	2nd Round
2001	3	USL D-3 Pro League	4th, Southern	did not qualify	did not qualify
2002	3	USL D-3 Pro League	4th, Southern	did not qualify	did not qualify
2003	3	USL Pro Soccer League	3rd, Southern	did not qualify	did not qualify
2004	3	USL Pro Soccer League	3rd, Southern	did not qualify	did not qualify
2005	3	USL Second Division	9th	did not qualify	did not qualify
2006	4	USL PDL	4th, Mid Atlantic	did not qualify	did not qualify
2007	4	USL PDL	7th, Mid Atlantic	did not qualify	did not qualify
2008	4	USL PDL	5th, Mid Atlantic	did not qualify	did not qualify
2009	4	USL PDL	7th, Mid Atlantic	did not qualify	did not qualify
2010	4	USL PDL	5th, Mid Atlantic	did not qualify	did not qualify
2011	4	USL PDL	2nd, South Atlantic	Conference Quarterfinals	did not qualify
2012	4	USL PDL	7th, South Atlantic	did not qualify	did not qualify
2013	4	USL PDL	3rd, South Atlantic	did not qualify	did not qualify
2014	4	USL PDL	6th, Mid Atlantic	did not qualify	did not qualify
Year	Division	League	Regular season	Playoffs	U.S. Open Cup
D.C. United U-23
2015	4	USL PDL	5th, Mid Atlantic	did not qualify	did not qualify
Evergreen FC
2016	4	USL PDL	7th, Mid Atlantic	did not qualify	did not qualify
2017	4	USL PDL	7th, Mid Atlantic	did not qualify	did not qualify
2018	4	USL PDL	6th, Mid Atlantic	did not qualify	did not qualify
2019	4	USL League Two	8th, Mid Atlantic	did not qualify	did not qualify
2020	Season cancelled due to COVID-19 pandemic				
Northern Virginia FC
2021	4	USL League Two	3rd, Mid Atlantic	did not qualify	did not qualify
2022	4	USL League Two	3rd, Chesapeake	did not qualify	did not qualify
2023	4	USL League Two	2nd, Chesapeake	did not qualify	did not qualify
2024	4	USL League Two	4th, Chesapeake	did not qualify	did not qualify
2025	4	USL League Two	1st, Chesapeake	Conference semifinals	did not qualify
2026	4	USL League Two	9th, Chesapeake	did not qualify	did not qualify

=== Eastern Premier Soccer League ===
Year	Division	League	Regular season	Record (W-D-L)	Playoffs	U.S. Open Cup*
2020–21	5	Eastern Premier Soccer League	2nd, Mid-Atlantic	6–0–1	did not qualify	2nd Round
2021–22	5	Eastern Premier Soccer League	1st, Mid-Atlantic	12–0–1	Champion	4th Qualifying Round
2022–23	5	Eastern Premier Soccer League	1st, Mid-Atlantic	10–0–0	Champion	4th Qualifying Round

*Club entered in local qualifying round

=== Major Arena Soccer League 3 ===
Year	Division	League	Regular season	Record (W-L-T)	Playoffs
2021–22	3	Major Arena Soccer League 3	1st, East	10–0–0	Champion
2022–23	3	Major Arena Soccer League 3	1st, East	7–2–0	Champion

=== USL W League ===
Year	Division	League	Regular season	Record (W-L-T)	Playoffs
2022	4	USL W League	5th, Mid Atlantic	1–7–2	did not qualify
2023	4	USL W League	3rd, Mid Atlantic	6–0–5	did not qualify
2024	4	USL W League	6th, Mid Atlantic	4–8–0	did not qualify
2025	4	USL W League	2nd, Mid Atlantic	7–2–1	did not qualify
2026	4	USL W League	3rd, Mid Atlantic	5–0–5	did not qualify

== Honors ==
=== League ===
- American Premier Soccer League
  - Mid-Atlantic Conference Regular Season Champion (2): 2021–22; 2022–23
  - Playoff Champion (2): 2021–22; 2022–23
- Major Arena Soccer League 3
  - East Division Regular Season Champion (2): 2022; 2023
  - Playoff Champion (2): 2022; 2023
- National Independent Soccer Association
  - NISA Nation National Champion (1): 2023

=== Cups ===
- Metropolitan DC-Virginia Soccer Association
  - MDCVSA State Cup (2): 2021, 2022
- National Independent Soccer Association
  - NISA Independent Cup – Mid-Atlantic Region (Runner-Up): 2022
- US Adult Soccer Association Region I
  - National Amateur Cup Region I (1): 2022
- US Adult Soccer Association
  - National Amateur Cup (Runner-Up): 2022

== Statistics ==
=== Career USL 2 Goal Leaders ===
Rank	Player	Goals	Career span
1	AJ Sheta	13	2016-
2	JP Ayolmbong	12	2022-
3	Vagner Marquis	11	2022-
4	Tyler Clegg	8	2018-2022
5	KJ Nadeau	7	2019-
6	Bernardo Majano	6	2016-2019
6	Martin Ngoh	6	2021
8	DJ Charlton	5	2018-2019
9	Luke Campbell	4	2021-
9	Connor Coward	4	2016-2017
9	Jhonny de Souza	4	2018-
9	John Emmons	4	2017-2018
9	Lewis Long	4	2017
14	Samuel Biyo	3	2018
14	Graydon Hester	3	2016-2017
14	Iliass Laghjibi	3	2022-
14	Declan Quill	3	2023-
14	Alton West	3	2021-

*Through 2023 USL 2 Season

== Head coaches ==
- (Spain) Silvino Gonzalo (1998–2007)
- (United States) John Pascarella (2007–2008)
- (United States) Tom Torres (2009–2010)
- (England) Richie Burke (2011–2012)
- (United States) Grady Renfrow (2013–2014)
- (England) Richie Burke (2014–2015)
- (England) Brian Welsh (2014–2015)
- (England) Ian Bishop (2016)
- (United States) Grady Renfrow (2017)
- (United States) Paul Ngend (2018–2019)
- (United States) Grady Renfrow (2021–)
