= Allentown United FC =

American Association Football club

- Full name: Allentown United Football Club
- Founded: 2018; 8 years ago
- Stadium: Cedar Crest College
- President: Emmanuel Ntow-Mensah
- Head Coach: Gideon Baah
- League: NISA Nation
Home colours	Away colours

Allentown United FC is an American soccer club based in Allentown, Pennsylvania that plays in NISA Nation Northeast Conference. Since 2022, it has been a member of the 4th tier of the US soccer pyramid.

== History ==
Allentown United FC was founded by the young Lehigh Valley native, Emmanuel Ntow-Mensah in 2018 with the goal of supporting the local soccer community with hopes to showcase the talent on a broader regional and national level. The club made its debut on field in 2019 by joining the United Premier Soccer League. In the summer of 2021 Allentown United played in the 2021 NISA Independent Cup. From 2022 the first team will join NISA Nation.
