= Albion SC Delaware =

Bearfight @ Albion SC Delaware
- Founded: 2020; 6 years ago
- Stadium: Appoquinimink High School; Middletown, Delaware
- Technical director: Brad Fielder
- League: NISA Nation
- 2021: 6th
- Website: https://www.albionscdelaware.org/ https://bearfightfc.com/

Bearfight @ Albion SC Delaware, born from the merge of Albion SC Delaware with Bearfight FC, is an American semi-professional soccer club based in Middletown, Delaware that currently plays in the NISA Nation, the fourth tier of the American soccer pyramid.

== History ==
Bearfight FC was founded in 2013, meanwhile Albion SC Delaware was formed in 2015 as Delaware Revolution played their first competitive season as a franchise in 2016. In 2020 the two clubs merged and formed Bearfight @ Albion SC Delaware and in 2021 they debuted into NISA Nation as founder club. The club is part of the Albion SC family and it's owned by National Independent Soccer Association club Albion San Diego.

== Year-by-Year ==
Year	Division	League	Record	Regular season	US Open Cup
2021	4	NISA Nation	2–0–8	6th, Northeast Region	Ineligible
