= Colorado Rovers S.C. =

Colorado Rovers
- Full name: Colorado Rovers Football Club
- Nickname: Rovers
- Founded: 1992
- Ground: Shea Stadium; Highlands Ranch, CO
- Capacity: 3,000
- League: Colorado Amateur Soccer League; USSSA
| Home colors | Away colors |

The Colorado Rovers are an American soccer club based in Denver, Colorado. The club is a member of the United States Specialty Sports Association, A US Soccer affiliate that plays in the Colorado Amateur Soccer League's first division. Founded in 1992, the club gained notoriety in 2013 when they reached the play-in round of the 2013 Lamar Hunt U.S. Open Cup, upon winning the 2013 USSSA National Cup. The Rovers lost their opening match of the Open Cup in a penalty shoot-out against fourth division, NPSL outfit, Georgia Revolution.

The Colorado Rovers have now qualified to play in the 2014 Lamar Hunt U.S. Open Cup after winning the USSSA National Cup for a 2nd straight year.

Honours
2014 Vail Invitational Gold Champions
2014 Lamar Hunt US Open Cup (Play-In Round)
2013 USSSA Elite National Champions
2013 Lamar Hunt US Open Cup Play-In Round
2013 Fall CASL League Champions
2012 USSSA Elite National Champions
2012 Colorado State Cup Champions
2011 USSSA National Cup
2010 USASA Region IV National Amateur Cup
2009 USASA Region IV Champions
2008 NM Fall Classic Champions
2007 USASA Region IV National Amateur Cup
2006 USASA Region IV National Amateur Cup
2005 Vail Invitational Gold Champions
2005 CASL League Champions
2004 CASL League Champions
