= Chula Vista FC =

American soccer club

- Full name: Chula Vista Futbol Club
- Founded: 1982; 44 years ago
- Ground: Stan Canaris Stadium
- Capacity: 6,000
- Head coach: J Hector Diaz
- League: NISA Nation
- Website: chulavistafc.com
Home colors

Chula Vista Futbol Club is an American soccer club based in Chula Vista, California. The club's first team competes in NISA Nation.

== History ==
Chula Vista FC was originally established as a youth soccer organization and added a senior team in 2011. The club's stated goal for the senior team is to provide a bridge between youth and professional soccer for players not in the college soccer system. Notable players that went through the CVFC youth soccer system include Alejandro Guido, Paul Arriola, Joe Corona, Gabriel Farfan and Michael Farfan. CVFC has played against other crosstown teams losing 3-1 in a friendly with North County Battalion and beating their rival Albion SC Pros 3-2. Chula Vista FC aims to eventually have a team for all the United States Soccer Development academy ages and possibly move up to the NASL or USL.

The club gained a measure of national acclaim for its performances in the 2015 Lamar Hunt U.S. Open Cup which included a road win over Arizona United SC, a professional club from the United Soccer League. CVFC was eliminated in the second qualifying round of the 2016 Lamar Hunt U.S. Open Cup in a 4-0 loss against La Máquina FC at home.

On August 25, 2021, the club was announced as a founding member of NISA Nation, a fourth-tier league, for its inaugural 2021 season.

On September 22, 2019, Chula Vista FC faced city rivals Rebels Soccer Club in a Chula Vista Derby in the first qualifying round of the 2020 Lamar Hunt U.S. Open Cup. Chula Vista FC drawing 2-2 and won 5-3 on penalties.

== SWPL Championship ==
On Saturday, August 29, the Chula Vista Futbol Club team won the Southwest premier league championship at Mater Academy, Las Vegas. They won 3-1 against Sin City FC. The first goal by Chula Vista FC came in the 35th minute by the Sin City FC goalkeeper's deflection. The second goal happened by a pass and hit between two team players in the 69th minute. The third goal happened by an outside the box shot in the 87th minute, scoring the victory.

== Chula Vista FC II ==
Chula Vista FC II, CVFC reserve team, currently plays in the SoCal Premier League as part of the SWPL.

== Honors ==
- USASA Region IV Open Cup
  - Winners: 2015
- Cal South Adult State Cup
  - Winners: 2018 Open Division
  - Runners-up: 2019 Premier Division

== 2015 Lamar Hunt U.S. Open Cup results ==
May 13	FC Tucson (4)	1–2 (a.e.t.)	Chula Vista FC (5)	Tucson, Arizona
19:30 UTC-7	Zambrano 58'	Report	Lopez 82'; Pinal 95'	Stadium: Kino North Stadium; Attendance: 503; Referee: Denis Vargas

May 20	Arizona United SC (3)	0–3	Chula Vista FC (5)	Scottsdale, Arizona
19:30 UTC-8	Top (yellow card) 69'	Report	Diaz 37', 72'; Pinal 52'	Stadium: Scottsdale Stadium; Attendance: 1,408; Referee: Ramy Touchan

May 27	Sacramento Republic FC (3)	7–3	Chula Vista FC (5)	Sacramento, California
19:30 UTC-8	Guzmán 9'; Jakubek (yellow card) 39'; Gabeljic 43', 59', 89'; Stewart 52'; Taublieb (yellow card) 57', (goal) 74'; López 85'	Report	Pinal (yellow card) 25'; Ramirez 40' (pen.); Jakubek 75' (o.g.); Rubio 82'	Stadium: Bonney Field; Attendance: 10,018; Referee: Matthew Buckman
