= Roc City Boom =

American soccer team

- Full name: Roc City Boom
- Nickname: RCB
- Short name: Boom
- Founded: 2019
- Stadium: Rochester Sports Garden
- Capacity: N/A
- Owner: Icon Productions
- Manager: Marc Mandell
- League: Major Arena Soccer League 3
- 2026: 1st, East Division
- Website: http://www.roccityboom.com
Home colors	Away colors

The Roc City Boom are an American soccer team based in Rochester, New York. Founded in 2019, the team played in the United Premier Soccer League (UPSL) Premier Division, a national league at the fourth tier of the American Soccer Pyramid, in the Northeast Region's Western NY Conference from 2020-2023. They joined Major Arena Soccer League 3 in 2024. The team play its home games at Rochester Sports Garden in Rochester, New York.

== About ==
The Roc City Boom formed in 2019. The Boom lost only 1 game is their inaugural season, winning the Western NY Division with a 5–1–4 record. They added to their Division Title with a 4–1 win in the annual Agness Cup. They repeated as Champions of the Western New York Conference 3 years in a row.

== Stadium ==
The Boom played at Rochester Community Sports Complex, formerly Marina Auto Stadium, Rochester, New York in 2020 and 2021, and moved to Eastridge High School for the 2022 season. With their move to Arena Soccer, they now play their home games at Rochester Sports Garden.

== Year-by-year ==
Year	Division	League	Record	Regular season	Playoffs	Open Cup
2020	Premier	UPSL	5-1-4	1st, Western NY	Cancelled due to covid	Did not enter
2021	Premier	UPSL	10-2-0	1st, Western NY	Lost in Northeast Region 1st round	Lost in 3rd Qualifying Round
2022	Premier	UPSL	8-2-0	1st, Western NY	Lost in Northeast Region Final	Lost in 3rd Qualifying Round
2023	Premier	UPSL	6-3-2	5th, Western NY	Lost in WNY Quarterfinals	Lost in 2nd Qualifying Round
2024	Premier	NISA Nation	8-1-1	1st, Western NY	Lost in National Semi Final	Lost in 3rd Qualifying Round
2025	3	MASL	11-1-0	1st, East	Lost in National Final	N/A
2026	3	MASL	10-1-0	1st, East	Lost in National Quarter Final	N/A

== Players ==
=== 2026 Roster ===
Note: Flags indicate national team as defined under FIFA eligibility rules; some limited exceptions apply. Players may hold more than one non-FIFA nationality.

No.	Pos.	Nation	Player
1	GK	USA	Alan Ibarra
9	DF	USA	Dan Reger
14	DF	USA	Alex Harling
0	GK	USA	Alastair Farmer
7	FW	USA	Austin Gerber
12	MF	ENG	Joe Balls
17	MF	PAN	Alex Vega
22	FW	USA	Andrew Coughlin
8	MF	USA	Andrew O’Neill
28	FW	USA	Andriy Demydiv
25	FW	UKR	Bogdan Yatsishin
18	MF	USA	Caleb Munski
26	MF	USA	Konrad Zydowicz
42	DF	USA	Jake Schindler
10	FW	USA	Eduardo Figueroa

No.	Pos.	Nation	Player
16	FW	USA	Fernando Furioso
6	MF	MEX	Iann Briones
99	GK	USA	Jakeb Mitchell
13	MF	USA	Jameson Railey
19	MF	USA	Juan Lucena
23	DF	ECU	Juan Pablo Reyes
3	MF	USA	Kostas Kantaras
5	DF	USA	Luca Dodge
20	FW	USA	Matt Schuber
7	MF	USA	Mike Decaro
21	MF	USA	Paul Palmgreen
4	FW	USA	Preston Garcia
11	FW	BRA	Rafa Godoi
67	MF	USA	Renzo Coronel
2	GK	USA	Samuel Furioso

Note: Roster up-to-date as of June 20, 2026.
