= Steel Pulse FC =

- Full name: Steel Pulse Football Club
- Nickname: Pulse
- Founded: 2019; 7 years ago
- Stadium: Milford Mill Academy
- League: NISA Nation
Home colours

Steel Pulse FC is an American semiprofessional soccer team based in Baltimore, Maryland. The team, which was founded in 2019, currently plays in 4th tier league NISA Nation and plays its home games in the Marriotts Ridge High School.

== History ==
Steel Pulse FC has been founded in 2019 in Baltimore, Maryland. The club immediately won the Spring 2019 and Fall 2019 Maryland Major Soccer League (6th tier) seasons, subsequently ranking up to Eastern Premier Soccer League (5th tier), and after winning the 2021 Mid-Atlantic Region regular season the club made its debut into NISA Nation (4th tier league) into the Northeast Region as founder club.

== Honours ==
- Maryland Major Soccer League Spring 2019 Champion
- Maryland Major Soccer League Fall 2019 Champion
- Maryland Major Soccer League Spring 2021 Champion
- EPSL Mid Atlantic Region 2021 Champion

== Year-by-year ==
Year	Tier	League	Region	Regular season
2021 Fall	4	NISA Nation	Northeast Region	3rd, Northeast Region
