= FC Golden State Force =

American soccer team based in Pomona, California

- Full name: Football Club Golden State Force
- Founded: 2015; 11 years ago
- Stadium: Rio Hondo College; Whittier, California
- League: USL League Two
- 2022: 9th, Southwest Division; Playoffs: BNQ
- Website: fcgoldenstateforce.com
Home colors	Away colors

FC Golden State Force is an American soccer team based in Whittier, California, United States that currently plays in USL League Two. The club currently plays at Rio Hondo College.

In mid-2019, the club announced Los Angeles Force, a professional team that competed in the National Independent Soccer Association.

== Year-by-year ==
Year	Division	League	Regular season	Playoffs	Open cup
2016	4	USL PDL	3rd, Southwest	Conference semifinals	Did not enter
2017	4	USL PDL	1st, Southwest	National semifinals	Second round
2018	4	USL PDL	1st, Southwest	Conference semifinals	Fourth round
2019	4	USL League Two	1st, Southwest	National semifinals	First round
2020	4	USL League Two	Season cancelled due to COVID-19 pandemic		
2020	5	NISA Nation			
2022	4	USL League Two	9th, Southwest	Did not qualify	Did not qualify

== Honors ==
- USL PDL Western Conference Champions 2017
- USL PDL Southwest Division Champions 2017, 2018
- USL League Two Western Conference Champions 2019
- USL League Two Southwest Division Champions 2019
