= 2023 U.S. Open Cup qualification =

2023 Lamar Hunt U.S. Open Cup qualification
U.S. Open Cup

Tournament details
- Country: United States
- Dates: September 17 – December 18, 2022
- Teams: 107
- 2023 U.S. Open Cup: Beaman United FC (UPSL); Capo FC (NISAN); Chicago House AC (MWPL); Club de Lyon 2 (NISAN); International San Francisco SC (SFSFL); Lansdowne Yonkers (EPSL); Miami United FC (NSL); UDA Soccer (UPSL); West Chester United (USLP)

Tournament statistics
- Matches played: 98
- Goals scored: 385 (3.93 per match)

The 2023 Lamar Hunt U.S. Open Cup was the 108th edition of the oldest soccer tournament in the United States. The tournament proper featured both professional and amateur teams in the United States soccer league system.

Qualification for the 2023 tournament includes local qualifying matches contested by 107 amateur teams scheduled to take place in 2022. One team also qualified by winning the 2022 National Amateur Cup. Clubs playing in fully professional leagues may enter the tournament proper and bypass the qualification process.

== Qualification procedures ==
The United States Soccer Federation's (U.S. Soccer) Open Cup Committee manages both the tournament proper and the local qualification process.

Clubs based in the United States that play in a league that is an organization member of U.S. Soccer are generally eligible to compete for the U.S. Open Cup, if their league includes at least four teams and has a schedule of at least 10 matches for each club.

U.S.-based teams in Division I, II and III professional leagues qualify for the U.S. Open Cup automatically, provided they are eligible. To be eligible, these teams must be members in good standing of their leagues on December 31, 2021, and remain so through the 2023 U.S. Open Cup Final. The league must have been in operation prior to the open division entry deadline and remain in operation through the 2023 U.S. Open Cup Final. A new Division I, II or III professional league must have its match schedule announced to the public by January 31, 2022, and the first match must be scheduled for no later than seven days before the first scheduled round of the U.S. Open Cup tournament proper that involves the team's division. If a new club joins an existing Division I, II or III league, the league must meet the aforementioned criteria applicable to new leagues in order for the new club to be eligible for the U.S. Open Cup.

A professional team that is majority owned by a higher-level professional team or whose player roster is materially managed by a higher-level professional team is ineligible to participate in the U.S. Open Cup.

Clubs that are below Division III are Open Division teams. To be eligible for the 2023 U.S. Open Cup, an Open Division team must remain a playing member in good standing within its competition from the Open Division Entry Deadline through the final of the 2023 U.S. Open Cup . The league must have been in operation since no later than the open Division Entry Deadline, and remain so until the 2023 U.S. Open Cup Final. A team that started its first season of competition in an existing league must have started its new league's schedule no later than Open Division Entry Deadline.

Starting in 2019, the winner of the previous year's National Amateur Cup automatically qualifies for the U.S. Open Cup. The cup winner enters the tournament proper in the first round with the other Open Division clubs.

National leagues may elect to use the results of their previous year's seasons to determine which of their teams qualify for the U.S. Open Cup in lieu of having their teams play local qualifying matches. If a national league so elects, its teams are not eligible to participate in local qualifying. To qualify as a national league, the league must

- Have a minimum of 50 active U.S.-based teams in good standing,
- Have a common championship each season that is only available to league teams and is compulsory,
- Use a league format with a standings table as opposed to a single-elimination (knockout) format,
- Have teams in at least three U.S. time zones among Eastern, Central, Mountain and Pacific, with the three time zones containing the most teams each having at least 15% of the member teams,
- Have two time zones represented by at least three different U.S. states or the District of Columbia and a third time zone represented by at least two different U.S. states or the District of Columbia,
- Have teams in at least 10 different U.S. states or the District of Columbia,
- Timely pay the team-based Open Cup entry fee for all teams in the league.
- Must have operated over the last 12-month period and over the next 12-month period in compliance with these criteria.

Eligible Open Division clubs that did not win the National Amateur Cup and are not members of national leagues must have submitted an application to enter local qualifying by August 8, 2022.

Once applications for local qualifying are approved, U.S. Soccer preliminary estimates of the number of Open Division teams needed in the U.S. Open Cup, based on the anticipated participation of professional teams and anticipated structure of the tournament bracket. One of these slots is allocated to the National Amateur Cup champions. The remainder are allocated among the pool of local qualification teams and the national leagues, based on the relative number of teams in each, resulting in a target number of local qualifiers. The Commissioner will establish the number of qualifying rounds needed to achieve the number of surviving local qualifying teams after the target number of First Round slots is determined. The Commissioner will attempt to minimize the number of byes in order to ensure teams that advance to the First Round have played the same number of games. Byes are distributed randomly and are meant to avoid unnecessary travel but are kept to a minimum to preserve the integrity of the qualification tournament. Once the qualification tournament format has been finalized, the number of local qualifiers becomes fixed, unless a team that qualifies later becomes ineligible. After the December 31, 2021 professional clubs entry application deadline, the final number of Open Division teams needed in the 2022 U.S. Open Cup will become known. From this number, the fixed number of local qualifiers plus one for the National Amateur Cup champion are subtracted to determine the number of slots for clubs from the national leagues. These slots are allocated among the leagues based on their relative numbers of U.S. based eligible teams.

== National Amateur Cup ==
Milwaukee Bavarian SC defeated Northern Virginia FC, 1–0, to win the 2022 National Amateur Cup and qualify for the 2023 U.S. Open Cup.

== Local qualifying ==
U.S. Soccer originally announced that 107 teams would participate in local qualifying. Four rounds of local qualifying matches will result in 9 clubs advancing to the tournament proper. Local qualifying will be competed in a single-game, knockout format and match-ups will be organized geographically to minimize travel time and expenses. Random selection will be used to determine matchups when possible and coin flips will determine home teams.

=== Schedule ===
Schedule for 2023 Lamar Hunt U.S. Open Cup Qualifying
Round	Match day	New Teams	Entrants	Teams entered to date
First Qualifying Round	September 17–18, 2022	70	70	70
Second Qualifying Round	October 15–16, 2022	37	72	107
Third Qualifying Round	November 19–20, 2022	0	36	107
Fourth Qualifying Round	December 17–18, 2022	0	18	107

=== Number of teams by state and league ===
A total of 25 states and the District of Columbia are represented by clubs in the U.S. Open Cup Qualification this year.

	States	Number	League	Teams
1	California	11	UPSL	A.S. Los Angeles, Davis Legacy, Desert FC, Elk Grove Blues, Escondido FC, Irvine FC, Laguna United FC, OC Kings FC, Orange County FC, Rebels Soccer Club, Trojans FC
1	California	5	Southwest Premier League	LA Monsters FC, Modesto City Football Club, Olympiacos CA, Temecula FC
1	California	2	National Soccer League	Marin County Union SC, Real San Jose
1	California	1	NISA Nation	Capo FC
1	California	1	San Francisco Soccer Football League	International San Francisco SC
1	California	1	West Coast Soccer Association	UC Davis Soccer Club
2	Florida	9	UPSL	Clearwater Chargers SC, Doral SC, Florida Premier FC, Florida Soccer Soldiers, Gainesville City FC, International Soccer Association, Juventus Academy, Naples City FC, O'Shea's FC
2	Florida	7	National Soccer League	City Soccer FC, Florida Brothers, Hurricane FC, Miami Soccer Academy, Miami United FC, Naples United FC, West Palm Beach Academy CF
2	Florida	2	NISA Nation	Club de Lyon, Deportivo Lake Mary FC
2	Florida	1	Central Florida Soccer League	Orlando FC Wolves
3	New York	3	UPSL	Oyster Bay United FC, Queensboro II, Sahara Gunners FC
3	New York	3	Eastern Premier Soccer League	Lansdowne Yonkers, New York Greek-American, New York Pancyprian-Freedoms
3	New York	1	Rochester District Soccer League	IASC Boom
3	New York	1	Cosmopolitan Soccer League	Manhattan Kickers
3	Pennsylvania	5	United Soccer League of Pennsylvania	Philadelphia Ukrainians Nationals, United German Hungarians, Vereinigung Erzgebirge, West Chester United, Lancaster City FC
3	Pennsylvania	2	UPSL	Lancaster Elite, Philadelphia Lone Star
3	Pennsylvania	1	Eastern Premier Soccer League	Kensington Soccer Club
5	Colorado	6	Colorado Super League	Athletic Club of Sloan's Lake, Azteca FC, Boulder United FC, Colorado Rovers, FC Denver, Harpos
5	Colorado	1	Mountain Premier League	Peak Eleven Football Club
6	Texas	3	UPSL	Alamo City Soccer Club, D'Feeters Kicks Soccer Club, FC Fort Worth
6	Texas	3	National Soccer League	D10 Lions FC, Galveston Pelicans FC, Houston FC
7	New Jersey	2	Garden State Soccer League	Jackson Lions FC, SC Vistula Garfield
7	New Jersey	2	Eastern Premier Soccer League	Real Central NJ, Kearny Scots
7	New Jersey	1	UPSL	New Jersey Alliance
8	Arizona	3	UPSL	Coronado Athletic Club, FC Arizona, Olympians FC
8	Arizona	1	NISA Nation	SC Union Maricopa
8	Massachusetts	2	UPSL	Boston Street FC, Unations FC
8	Massachusetts	1	Bay State Soccer League	Brockton FC United
8	Massachusetts	1	Eastern Premier Soccer League	Ruggles Pro FC
10	District of Columbia	2	DC Premier League	DCFC, Team Tevez
10	District of Columbia	1	American Premier League	Aegean Hawks
10	Maryland	2	Maryland Super Soccer League	Christos, Steel Pulse
10	Maryland	1	UPSL	Germantown City FC
12	Georgia	2	UPSL	Kalonji Pro-Profile, TCSA
12	Kentucky	2	UPSL	Bowling Green FC, Metro Louisville FC
12	North Carolina	1	UPSL	Mint Hill FC
12	North Carolina	1	Triangle Adult Soccer League	Tobacco Road FC
12	Washington	1	UPSL	Bellevue Athletic FC
12	Washington	1	Federal Way Men's Open Sunday	Legend Football Gold
16	Alabama	1	UPSL	FC Birmingham
16	Connecticut	1	Connecticut Soccer League	Newtown Pride FC
16	Indiana	1	Ohio Valley Premier League	1972 SC
16	Illinois	1	Midwest Premier League	Chicago House AC
16	New Hampshire	1	UPSL	Santa Cruz FC
16	New Mexico	1	UPSL	UDA Soccer
16	Nevada	1	NISA Nation	Battleborn FC
16	Ohio	1	Ohio Valley Premier League	Valhalla FC
16	South Carolina	1	UPSL	South Carolina United Heat
16	Tennessee	1	UPSL	Beaman United FC
16	Virginia	1	Eastern Premier Soccer League	NoVa FC

- States without a team in the Open Cup Qualification: Alaska, Arkansas, Delaware, Hawaii, Idaho, Iowa, Louisiana, Kansas, Maine, Michigan, Minnesota, Mississippi, Missouri, Montana, Nebraska, North Dakota, Oklahoma, Oregon, Rhode Island, South Dakota, Utah, Vermont, West Virginia, Wisconsin and Wyoming.

== First qualifying round ==
The first qualifying round matches were scheduled to be played on September 17 and 18. Twenty-three East and fifteen West Region teams were given byes into the second qualifying round.

=== East region ===
September 17	Philadelphia Ukrainians (USLP) (Pennsylvania)	1–2	(Pennsylvania) West Chester United (USLP)	North Wales, PA
10:00 a.m. EDT		Report	Reese; Ramirez pen.'	Stadium: Ukrainian American Sports Center

September 17	Oyster Bay United FC (UPSL) (New York (state))	2–1 (a.e.t.)	(New Jersey) New Jersey Alliance (UPSL)	Rockville Centre, NY
2:30 p.m.				Stadium: Darcy Field

September 17	Florida Soccer Soldiers (UPSL) (Florida)	2–3	(Florida) City Soccer FC (NSL)	Pembroke Pines, FL
4:00 p.m. EDT				Stadium: South Campus Turf Field

September 17	Club de Lyon (NISAN) (Florida)	3–0	(Florida) Deportivo Lake Mary FC (NISAN)	Winter Park, FL
5:00 p.m. EDT				Stadium: Showalter Field

September 17	Juventus Academy (UPSL) (Florida)	4–3	(Florida) Doral SC (UPSL)	Pembroke Pines, FL
7:00 p.m. EDT				Stadium: South Campus Turf Field

September 17	Germantown City (UPSL) (Maryland)	2–1	(Washington, D.C.) Aegean Hawks (APL)	Clarksville, MD
7:00 p.m. EDT				Stadium: River Hill High School Stadium

September 17	SC Vistula Garfield (GSSL) (New Jersey)	1–0	(New York (state)) New York Pancyprian-Freedoms (EPSL)	Clifton, NJ
7:30 p.m. EDT				Stadium: Athenia Steel Recreation Complex

September 17	NoVa FC (EPSL) (Virginia)	0–0 (a.e.t.) (3–1 p)	(Maryland) Steel Pulse (MSSL)	Leesburg, VA
7:45 p.m. EDT				Stadium: VA Revolution Sportsplex

September 17	Lansdowne Yonkers (EPSL) (New York (state))	5–0	(New York (state)) Manhattan Kickers FC (CSL)	Yonkers, NY
8:00 p.m. EDT				Stadium: Tibbetts Brook Park

September 18	Ruggles Pro FC (EPSL) (Massachusetts)	0–0 (a.e.t.) (12–13 p)	(Massachusetts) Boston Street FC (UPSL)	Marlborough, MA
1:00 p.m. EDT				Stadium: Fore Kicks II Outdoor Soccer Field 1

September 18	Vereinigung Erzgebirge (USLP) (Pennsylvania)	2–1	(Pennsylvania) Philadelphia Lone Star (UPSL)	Warminster, PA
2:00 p.m. EDT	Smolyn 50'; Ciarlante 90+1'	Report	Dahn 64'	Stadium: VE Clubhouse Soccer Field

September 18	Lancaster City FC (USLP) (Pennsylvania)	2–3 (a.e.t.)	(Pennsylvania) Lancaster Elite (UPSL)	Lancaster, PA
3:00 p.m. EDT		Report	Weaver 110'	Stadium: Lancaster Catholic High School Stadium

September 18	Team Tevez (DCPL) (Washington, D.C.)	2–4 (a.e.t.)	(Washington, D.C.) DCFC (Washington, D.C.) (DCPL)	Washington, DC
4:00 p.m. EDT	Patch 48'; Firth 58'			Stadium: RFK Stadium Auxiliary Fields

September 18	Clearwater Chargers SC (UPSL) (Florida)	0–4	Florida Premier FC (UPSL)	Clearwater, FL
5:00 p.m. EDT				Stadium: Glenn Oaks Park

September 18	Kensington SC (EPSL) (Pennsylvania)	0–3	(Pennsylvania) United German Hungarians (USLP)	Philadelphia, PA
7:00 p.m. EDT				Stadium: The Proving Fair Grounds 6

September 18	Miami United (NSL) (Florida)	3–1	(Florida) Florida Brothers (NSL)	Hialeah, FL
7:00 p.m. EDT				Stadium: Ted Hendricks Stadium

September 18	Real Central New Jersey (EPSL) (New Jersey)	2–4	(New Jersey) Jackson Lions FC (GSSL)	West Windsor, NJ
7:00 p.m. EDT				Stadium: MCCC Soccer Stadium

September 18	Kearny Scots (EPSL) (New Jersey)	0–5	(New York (state)) Queensboro II (UPSL)	Kearny, NJ
7:30 p.m. EDT				Stadium: Kearny High School Stadium

September 18	Miami Soccer Academy (NSL) (Florida)	2–1	(Florida) O'Shea's FC (UPSL)	Miami Gardens, FL
8:00 p.m. EDT				Stadium: Spartan Stadium

September 18	New York Greek American (EPSL) (New York (state))	3–3 (a.e.t.) (11–10 p)	(Connecticut) Newtown Pride (CSL)	Hempstead, NY
8:00 p.m. EDT				Stadium: James M. Shuart Stadium

September 18	International Soccer Association (UPSL) (Florida)	5–3	(Florida) West Palm Beach Academy (NSL)	Pembroke Pines, FL
9:00 p.m. EDT				Stadium: South Campus Turf Field

- Byes: 1927 SC (Ind.), Beaman United FC (Tenn.), Bowling Green FC (Ky.), Brockton FC United (Mass.), Chicago House AC (Ill.), Christos FC (Md.), FC Birmingham (Ala.), Gainesville City FC (Fla.), Hurricane FC (Fla.), IASC Boom (N.Y.), Kalonji Pro-Profile (Ga.), Metro Louisville FC (Ky.), Mint Hill FC (N.C.), Naples City FC (Fla.), Naples United FC (Fla.), Orlando FC Wolves (Fla.), Sahara Gunners FC (N.Y.), Santa Cruz FC (Mass.), South Carolina United Heat (S.C.), TCSA (Ga.), Tobacco Road FC (N.C.), Unations FC (Mass.), Valhalla FC (Ohio)

=== West region ===
September 17	Houston FC (NSL) (Texas)	10–1	(Texas) Galveston Pelicans FC (NSL)	Houston, TX
1:00 p.m. CDT	Bridges,, Adwani, Calvillo; Crawford; Nwachukwu; Vigil; Luster	Report		Stadium: San Jacinto College South

September 17	FC Fort Worth (UPSL) (Texas)	1–5	(Texas) D'Feeters Kicks Soccer Club (UPSL)	Fort Worth, TX
6:00 p.m. CDT				Stadium: Southwest High School

September 17	LA Monsters FC (SWPL) (California)	3–0	(California) Irvine FC (UPSL)	Wilmington, CA
4:00 p.m. PDT				Stadium: Wilmington Athletic Complex

September 17	Rebels Soccer Club (UPSL) (California)	2–2 (a.e.t.) (1–3 p)	(California) Escondido FC (UPSL)	Spring Valley, CA
6:00 p.m. PDT				Stadium: Mount Miguel High School

September 17	FC Denver (CSL) (Colorado)	2–0	(Colorado) Harpos FC (CSL)	Denver, CO
8:00 p.m. MDT				Stadium: Northfield High School

September 17	FC Arizona (UPSL) (Arizona)	1–5	(Arizona) Valley FC Raiders	Mesa, AZ
7:00 p.m. MST				Stadium: Bell Bank Park

September 17	Laguna United FC (UPSL) (California)	3–0	(California) Olympiacos CA (SWPL)	Niguel, CA
7:00 p.m. PDT				Stadium: La Paz Sports Park

September 17	UC Davis Soccer Club (WCSA) (California)	3–4	(California) Davis Legacy (UPSL)	Davis, CA
8:15 p.m. PDT				Stadium: Dairy Outdoor Rec. Complex (UC Davis)

September 18	Athletic Club of Sloan's Lake FC (CSL) (Colorado)	3–0	(Colorado) Peak Eleven Football Club (MPL)	Wheat Ridge, CO
2:00 p.m. MDT	Love 48'; O'Brian 52'; Camerolinga 64'	Report		Stadium: Wheat Ridge High School

September 18	Colorado Rovers (CSL) (Colorado)	1–3	(Colorado) Azteca FC (CSL)	Golden, CO
4:00 p.m. MDT				Stadium: Victoria Sports Park

September 18	International San Francisco SC (SFSFL) (California)	5–0	(California) Marin County Union SC (NSL)	San Francisco, CA
4:30 p.m. PDT				Stadium: Beach Chalet Soccer Field

September 18	Outbreak FC (California)	0–0 (a.e.t.) (4–2 p)	(California) A.S. Los Angeles (UPSL)	Irvine, CA
5:00 p.m. PDT				Stadium: Orange County Great Park

September 18	OC Kings FC (UPSL) (California)	L–W (forfeit)	(California) Capo FC (NISA Nation)	Lake Forest, CA
7:00 p.m. PDT				Stadium: Lake Forest Sports Park

September 18	Trojans FC (UPSL) (California)	1–3	(California) Orange County FC (UPSL)	Duarte, CA
8:00 p.m. PDT				Stadium: Duarte High School

- Byes: Alamo City Soccer Club (Texas), BattleBorn FC (Nev.), Bellevue Athletic FC (Wash.), Boulder United FC (Colo.), Coronado Athletic Club (Ariz.), D10 Lions FC (Texas), Desert FC (Calif.), Elk Grove Blues (Calif.), Legend Football Gold (Wash.), Modesto City Football Club (Calif.), Olympians FC (Ariz.), Real San Jose (Calif.), Temecula FC (Calif.), UDA Soccer (N.M.)

== Second qualifying round ==
The second qualifying round matches were scheduled to be played on October 15 & 16.

=== East region ===
October 15	Queensboro II (UPSL) (New York (state))	1–4	(New York (state)) Oyster Bay United FC (UPSL)	Flushing, NY
10:30 a.m. EDT				Stadium: Queens College Varsity Soccer Field

October 15	TCSA (UPSL) (Georgia (U.S. state))	0–4	South Carolina United Heat (UPSL)	Vidalia, GA
2:00 p.m. EDT				Stadium: Paul Thigpin Chevrolet

October 15	FC Birmingham (UPSL) (Alabama)	1–5	(Georgia (U.S. state)) Kalonji Pro-Profile (UPSL)	Pleasant Grove, AL
3:00 p.m. CDT				Stadium: Pleasant Grove Soccer Complex

October 15	Valhalla FC (OVPL) (Ohio)	0–1	(Kentucky) Metro Louisville FC (UPSL)	Milford, OH
4:00 p.m. EDT				Stadium: Milford High School

October 15	Brockton FC United (BSSL) (Massachusetts)	1–0	(Massachusetts) Boston Street FC (UPSL)	Brockton, MA
6:00 p.m. EDT				Stadium: Rocky Marciano Stadium

October 15	Unations FC (UPSL) (Massachusetts)	1–0 (forfeit)	(Massachusetts) Santa Cruz FC (UPSL)	Marlborough, MA
6:30 p.m. EDT				Stadium: Fore Kicks II

October 15	Florida Premier FC (UPSL)	2–1	(Florida) Gainesville City FC (UPSL)	Trinity, FL
7:00 p.m. EDT				Stadium: GSports Clubhouse Field

October 15	Naples City FC (UPSL) (Florida)	4–0	(Florida) Naples United FC (NSL)	Naples, FL
7:00 p.m. EDT				Stadium: Paradise Coast Sports Complex

October 15	Orlando FC Wolves (CFSL) (Florida)	1–3	(Florida) Club de Lyon (NISA Nation)	Davenport, FL
7:00 p.m. EDT				Stadium: Northeast Regional Park

October 15	NoVa FC (EPSL) (Virginia)	6–0	(Maryland) Germantown City (UPSL)	Leesburg, VA
7:45 p.m. EDT				Stadium: Virginia Revolution Sportsplex

October 15	Bowling Green FC (UPSL) (Kentucky)	1–3	(Tennessee) Beaman United FC (UPSL)	Bowling Green, KY
8:00 p.m. EDT				Stadium: The Pit (Bowling Green Junior High)

October 16	Vereinigung Erzgebirge (USLP) (Pennsylvania)	2–0	(Pennsylvania) Lancaster Elite (UPSL)	Warminster, PA
2:00 p.m. EDT				Stadium: Vereinigung Erzgebirge Clubhouse

October 16	United German Hungarians (USLP) (Pennsylvania)	0–4	(Pennsylvania) West Chester United (USLP)	Ambler, PA
2:30 p.m. EDT				Stadium: Temple University Ambler Campus

October 16	New York Greek American (EPSL) (New York (state))	0–3	(New York (state)) Lansdowne Yonkers (EPSL)	Hempstead, NY
5:00 p.m. EDT				Stadium: Hofstra University Soccer Stadium

October 16	Tobacco Road FC (TASL) (North Carolina)	3–1	(North Carolina) Mint Hill FC (UPSL)	Durham, NC
5:00 p.m. EDT				Stadium: Durham County Memorial Stadium

October 16	Sahara Gunners FC (UPSL) (New York (state))	1–3	(New York (state)) IASC Boom (RDSL)	Elma, New York
6:00 p.m. EDT				Stadium: Sahlen’s Sports Park

October 16	DCFC (Washington, D.C.) (DCPL) (Washington, D.C.)	1–1 (a.e.t.) (5–4 p)	(Maryland) Christos FC (MMSL)	Washington, DC
6:30 p.m. EDT				Stadium: Jelleff Rec Center

October 16	Jackson Lions FC (GSSL) (New Jersey)	1–2	(New Jersey) SC Vistula Garfield (GSSL)	Tom's River, NJ
7:00 p.m. EDT				Stadium: Donovan Catholic High School

October 16	Hurricaine FC (NSL) (Florida)	0–2	(Florida) City Soccer FC (NSL)	Delray Beach, FL
8:00 p.m. EDT				Stadium: Seacrest Soccer Complex

October 16	Miami Soccer Academy (NSL) (Florida)	3–1 (a.e.t.)	(Florida) Juventus Academy (UPSL)	Miami Gardens, FL
8:00 p.m. EDT				Stadium: Monsignor Edward Pace High School

October 16	International Soccer Association (UPSL) (Florida)	0–5	(Florida) Miami United (NSL)	Pembroke Pines, FL
9:00 p.m. EDT				Stadium: UPSL Stadium (Broward College-South Campus)

October 16	Chicago House AC (MWPL) (Illinois)	1–1 (a.e.t.) (4–3 p)	(Indiana) 1927 SC (OVPL)	Chicago, Illinois
2:00 p.m. CDT				Stadium: Hales Franciscan High School

=== West region ===
October 15	Azteca FC (CSL) (Colorado)	1–4	(Colorado) FC Denver (CSL)	Commerce City, CO
5:00 p.m. CDT				Stadium: Dick’s Sporting Goods Park

October 15	LA Monsters FC (SWPL) (California)	1–6	(California) Desert FC (UPSL)	Wilmington, CA
6:45 p.m. PDT				Stadium: Wilmington Athletic Complex

October 15	Alamo City SC (UPSL) (Texas)	2–3	(Texas) D'Feeters Kicks Soccer Club (UPSL)	San Antonio, TX
8:00 p.m. CDT				Stadium: Alamo Sportsplex

October 15	D10 Lions FC (NSL) (Texas)	3–2	(Texas) Houston FC (NSL)	Houston, TX
8:00 p.m. CDT				Stadium: Matias Almeyda Training Center

October 15	Olympians FC (UPSL) (Arizona)	2–0	(Arizona) Valley FC Raiders (NISAN)	Mesa, AZ
10:00 p.m. MST				Stadium: Legacy Sports USA; Attendance: 95

October 15	Real San Jose (NSL) (California)	0–4	(California) International San Francisco SC (SFSFL)	San Jose, CA
10:00 p.m. PDT				Stadium: PAL Stadium

October 15	Elk Grove Blues (UPSL) (California)	1–2	(California) Davis Legacy (UPSL)	Elk Grove, CA
11:00 p.m. PDT				Stadium: Bartholomew Sports Park

October 16	UDA Soccer (UPSL) (New Mexico)	4–0	(Arizona) Coronado Athletic Club (UPSL)	Las Cruces, NM
12:00 p.m. MDT				Stadium: UDA at New Mexico State University

October 16	Athletic Club of Sloan's Lake FC (CSL) (Colorado)	2–1	(Colorado) Boulder United FC (CSL)	Wheat Ridge, CO
12:00 p.m. MDT				Stadium: Wheat Ridge High School

October 16	Escondido FC (UPSL) (California)	1–0	(California) Outbreak FC (SWPL)	Escondido, CA
6:30 p.m. PDT				Stadium: San Pasqual High School

October 16	Modesto City Football Club (SWPL) (California)	2–4	(Nevada) BattleBorn FC (NISAN)	Modesto, CA
9:00 p.m. PDT				Stadium: Central Catholic High School

October 16	Orange County FC (UPSL) (California)	7–1	(California) Temecula FC (SWPL)	Lake Forest, CA
9:00 p.m. PDT				Stadium: Lake Forest Sports Park

October 16	Bellevue Athletic FC (UPSL) (Washington (state))	0–1	(Washington (state)) Legend Football Gold (FWMOS)	Bellevue, WA
10:00 p.m. PDT				Stadium: Bellevue College Soccer Field

October 19	Laguna United FC (UPSL) (California)	1–4	(California) Capo FC (NISA Nation)	Laguna Niguel, CA
10:00 p.m. PDT				Stadium: La Paz Sports Park

== Third qualifying round ==
The third qualifying round matches were scheduled to be played on November 19 & 20.

=== East region ===
November 19	Club de Lyon (NISAN) (Florida)	4–2	(Florida) Florida Premier FC (UPSL)	Orlando, FL
3:00 p.m. EDT				Stadium: Young Pine Park

November 19	Metro Louisville FC (UPSL) (Kentucky)	1–2	(Illinois) Chicago House AC (MWPL)	Jeffersonville, IN
4:00 p.m. EDT				Stadium: Woehrle Athletic Complex

November 19	DCFC (Washington, D.C.) (DCPL)' (Washington, D.C.)	0–1	(Virginia) NoVa FC (EPSL)	Washington, DC
6:30 p.m. EDT				Stadium: Jelleff Recreation Center

November 19	Lansdowne Yonkers (EPSL) (New York (state))	4–1	(New York (state)) Oyster Bay United FC (UPSL)	Yonkers, NY
7:00 p.m. EDT				Stadium: Tibbetts Brooke Park

November 19	SC Vistula Garfield (GSSL) (New Jersey)	2–1	(New York (state)) IASC Boom (RDSL)	Clifton, NJ
7:30 p.m. EDT				Stadium: Athenia Steel Recreation Complex

November 20	Brockton FC United (BSSL) (Massachusetts)	5–2	(Massachusetts) Unations FC (UPSL)	Randolph, MA
2:00 p.m. EDT				Stadium: Randolph High School

November 20	Vereinigung Erzgebirge (USLP) (Pennsylvania)	0–4	(Pennsylvania) West Chester United (USLP)	Warminster, PA
2:00 p.m. EDT				Stadium: VE Clubhouse Soccer Field

November 20	South Carolina United Heat (UPSL)	3–0	(North Carolina) Tobacco Road FC (TASL)	Columbia, SC
5:00 p.m. EDT				Stadium: Southeastern Freight Lines Soccer Center

November 20	Kalonji Pro-Profile (UPSL) (Georgia (U.S. state))	4–4 (a.e.t.) (3–4 p)	(Tennessee) Beaman United FC (UPSL)	Snellville, GA
7:00 p.m. EDT				Stadium: Shiloh Generals Stadium

November 20	Miami Soccer Academy (NSL) (Florida)	0–3	(Florida) Naples City FC (UPSL)	Miami Gardens, FL
7:00 p.m. EDT				Stadium: Spartan Stadium

November 20	Miami United (NSL) (Florida)	3–2	(Florida) City Soccer FC (NSL)	Hialeah, FL
7:00 p.m. EDT				Stadium: Ted Hendricks Stadium

=== West region ===
November 19	D'Feeters Kicks Soccer Club (UPSL) (Texas)	2–0 (abandoned)	(Texas) D10 Lions FC (NSL)	Mansfield, TX
5:00 p.m. CDT				Stadium: Lake Ridge High School

November 19	Orange County FC (UPSL) (California)	7–3	(California) Escondido FC (UPSL)	Lake Forest, CA
8:00 p.m. PDT				Stadium: Lake Forest Sports Park

November 20	UDA Soccer (UPSL) (New Mexico)	3–1 (a.e.t.)	(Arizona) Olympians FC (UPSL)	Las Cruces, NM
10:00 a.m. PDT				Stadium: UDA at New Mexico State University

November 20	Athletic Club of Sloan's Lake FC (CSL) (Colorado)	1–5	(Colorado) Azteca FC (CSL)	Wheat Ridge, CO
1:00 p.m. MDT				Stadium: Wheat Ridge High School

November 20	International San Francisco SC (SFSFL) (California)	5–0	(California) Davis Legacy (UPSL)	San Francisco, CA
4:00 p.m. PDT				Stadium: Beach Chalet Soccer Field

November 20	Legend Football Gold (FWMOS) (Washington (state))	0–1	(Nevada) BattleBorn FC (NISAN)	Federal Way, WA
5:00 p.m. PDT				Stadium: Saghalie Park

November 20	Desert FC (UPSL) (California)	L-W (forfeit)	(California) Capo FC (NISA Nation)	Palm Desert, CA
6:30 p.m. PDT				Stadium: Hovely Park

== Fourth qualifying round ==
The fourth qualifying round matches are scheduled to be played on December 17 & 18. The nine winners of this round will advance to the First Round of the tournament proper in March 2023

December 17	Brockton FC United (BSSL) (Massachusetts)	1–1 (a.e.t.) (7–8 p)	(Illinois) Chicago House AC (MWPL)	Randolph, MA
2:00 p.m. EDT		Report		Stadium: Randolph High School

December 17	South Carolina United Heat (UPSL) (South Carolina)	1–2 (a.e.t.)	(Florida) Club de Lyon (NISAN)	Columbia, SC
3:00 p.m. EDT		Report		Stadium: Southeastern Freight Lines Soccer Center

December 17	Azteca FC (CSL) (Colorado)	4–4 (a.e.t.) (1–4 p)	(New Mexico) UDA Soccer (UPSL)	Commerce City, CO
1:00 p.m. MDT		Report		Stadium: Dick’s Sporting Goods Park

December 17	BattleBorn FC (NISAN) (Nevada)	1–5	(California) International San Francisco SC (SFSFL)	Minden, NV
12:00 p.m. PDT		Report		Stadium: Douglas High School

December 17	NoVa FC (EPSL) (Virginia)	1–2	(Pennsylvania) West Chester United (USLP)	Leesburg, VA
7:00 p.m. EDT		Report		Stadium: VA Revolution Sportsplex

December 17	SC Vistula Garfield (GSSL) (New Jersey)	0–2	(New York (state)) Lansdowne Yonkers (EPSL)	Clifton, NJ
7:45 p.m. EDT		Report		Stadium: Athenia Steel Recreation Complex

December 18	Beaman United FC (UPSL) (Tennessee)	4–3 (a.e.t.)	(Texas) D'Feeters Kicks Soccer Club (UPSL)	Murfreesboro, TN
1:00 p.m. CDT	Poku 50', 68' (pen.); Bedai 96'; Omondi 116'	Report	Ocampo 8'; Gorish 61'; Gonzalez 113'	Stadium: Richard Siegel Soccer Complex

December 18	Miami United (NSL) (Florida)	2–1	(Florida) Naples City FC (UPSL)	Hialeah, FL
7:00 p.m. EDT		Report		Stadium: Milander Park

December 18	Orange County FC (UPSL) (California)	0–0 (a.e.t.) (2–3 p)	(California) Capo FC (NISA Nation)	Lake Forest, CA
6:00 p.m. PDT				Stadium: Lake Forest Sports Park
