= Rebels SC =

- Full name: Rebels Soccer Club
- Founded: 1982
- Ground: Mount Miguel High School
- General manager: Jesus Acevedo
- Head coach: Armin Munévar
- League: UPSL
- 2021: 2nd, UPSL SoCal South Premier Division
- Website: https://rebelssoccerclub.com
| Home colours | Away colours |

Rebels Soccer Club, simply known as Rebels, is an American semi-professional soccer club based in Chula Vista, California. The club competes in UPSL as a member of the SoCal South Premier Division.

== History ==
=== 2018 ===
In the year of 2018, general manager Jesus Acevedo launched an official Rebels SC Adult Program, forming a Rebels SC adult men’s team. Coached by Matt Emmert at the time, Rebels SC competed in the San Diego County Soccer League (SDCSL), entering the Cal South Adult State Cup. Rebels SC Adult Program also formed an under-23 team coached by Jesse Acevedo called Rebels United, competing in the SWPL SoCal Premier Division. Around this time, Rebels United were crowned San Diego Champions. As of latest information, there are no public records of “San Diego Champions” in the SWPL, nor was there a public announcement made by the Rebels SC Adult Program at the time.

=== 2019 ===
On July 17, 2019, the Rebels SC Adult Program announced Rebels SC will be joining the United Premier Soccer League (UPSL) for the 2019 fall season, competing in the SoCal South Premier Division. On July 28, Rebels United finished as runners-up for the under-23 regional championship, falling short to Irvine Outcasts. On September 22, they faced city rivals Chula Vista FC in the 2020 U.S. Open Cup first qualifying round, drawing 2-2 in regulation time and losing 5-3 on a penalty shootout. With the high demand for players that were interested in playing for Rebels SC, they formed an official second team in the SDCSL and stuck to the name Rebels United. Sadly, the team had to shutdown in late 2019 due to the COVID-19 pandemic.

=== 2021 ===
On June 30, 2021, Rebels SC got was crowned as champions of the SoCal South Premier Division. Rebels SC was recognized as 2022 Chula Vista Champions by the city of Chula Vista. On July 24, Rebels SC faced Temecula FC in the San Diego - Riverside County Cup in a two-legged final, winning 5-3 on aggregate.

=== 2022 ===
On February 8, 2022, the Rebels SC Adult Program announced Leo Ibarra as the new appointed head coach for the first team as Matt Emmert stepped down to spend time with his family. On March 25, the Rebels SC Adult Program announced the rebirth of the Rebels SC second team, calling it Rebels SC II, soon after on June 15 announcing the new appointed head coach to be Sergio Paredes. Although not officially announced, it has been shown Rebels SC II will compete in the SDCSL as evidenced by the Rebels SC Adult Program social media page, and previously competing in the SDCSL. On September 18, Rebels SC faced Gremio FC San Diego in the 2023 U.S. Open Cup first qualifying round, winning 7-1 and marking their first ever win in the competition. On October 17, Rebels SC faced Escondido FC in the 2023 U.S. Open Cup second qualifying round, losing 3-2. On December 14, the Rebels SC Adult Program announced Daniel Torre as a new appointed assistant coach for the next season for Rebels SC.

=== 2023 ===
On January 19, 2023, the Rebels SC Adult Program announced Armin Munévar as the new appointed head coach of the first team, as Leo Ibarra stepped down to coach a Rebels youth team. On October 1, Rebels SC faced Escondido FC in the 2024 U.S. Open Cup first qualifying round, drawing 2-2 in regulation time and losing 3-1 on a penalty shootout.

=== 2024 ===
In January 2024, Sergio Parades stepped down from Rebels SC II to join Houston Dynamo FC in the MLS, Jesus Acevedo took over as the new head coach for Rebels SC II. On September 30, Rebels SC Adult Program announced the relaunch of Rebels SC II to the SWPL, competing in the San Diego Premier Division. General manager Jesus Acevedo commented "We are excited to be part of the SWPL once again as the last time we participated was in 2018, and we were the San Diego Champions and regional finalist with our U23 team”.

=== 2025 ===
On August 5, 2025, the Rebels SC Adult Program announced the new assistant coach for Rebels SC to be Sergio Paredes with Rebels SC Adult Program saying “Welcome back to the Rebels family, Sergio!” as he's previously coached Rebels SC II. On October 12, Rebels SC is set to face City SC San Diego in the 2026 U.S. Open Cup second qualifying.

== Rebels SC II ==
Rebels SC II
- Full name: Rebels Soccer Club II
- Ground: Monte Vista High School Mount Miguel High School
- Head coach: Jesus Acevedo
- League: SWPL
- 2019: Runners-up, SWPL SoCal Premier Division U23 Championship

=== 2018 ===
In the year of 2018, general manager Jesus Acevedo launched an official Rebels SC Adult Program, forming an under-23 men’s team called Rebels United. Coached by Jesse Acevedo at the time, Rebels United competed in the SWPL SoCal Premier Division. Around this time, Rebels United were crowned San Diego Champions. As of latest information, there are no public records of “San Diego Champions” in the SWPL, nor was there a public announcement made by the Rebels SC Adult Program at the time.

=== 2019 ===
On July 28, 2019, Rebels United competed in the under-23 regional championship, falling short to Irvine Outcasts and finishing as runners-up. On September 16, the Rebels SC Adult Program announced they will be forming an official second team that will compete in the San Diego County Soccer League (SDCSL), they decided to continue with the name Rebels United. Sadly, the team had to shutdown in late 2019 due to the COVID-19 pandemic.

=== 2022 ===
On March 25, 2022, the Rebels SC Adult Program announced the rebirth of the Rebels SC second team, calling it Rebels SC II, soon after on June 15 announcing the new appointed head coach to be Sergio Paredes. Although not officially announced, it has been shown Rebels SC II will compete in the SDCSL as evidenced by the Rebels SC Adult Program social media page, and previously competing in the SDCSL.

=== 2024 ===
In January 2024, Sergio Parades stepped down from Rebels SC II to join Houston Dynamo FC in the MLS, Jesus Acevedo took over as the new head coach for Rebels SC II. On September 30, Rebels SC Adult Program announced the relaunch of Rebels SC II to the SWPL, competing in the San Diego Premier Division. General manager Jesus Acevedo commented "We are excited to be part of the SWPL once again as the last time we participated was in 2018, and we were the San Diego Champions and regional finalist with our U23 team”

== Honors ==
- UPSL SoCal South Premier Division
  - Runner-Ups: 2021 Fall Season
- UPSL SoCal South Premier Playoffs
  - Runners-up: 2022 Fall Season

== Lamar Hunt U.S. Open Cup ==
=== 2020 U.S. Open Cup Qualification ===
September 21, 2019
1:30 PM PST
First Round

| Chula Vista FC | 2-2 | Rebels SC |
|---|---|---|
| Martinez 1'; Diaz 41' | Report | Burguillo 22'; Gonzalez 62' |
Penalties
| | 5-4 |

Terra Nova Park, Chula Vista, California

=== 2022 U.S. Open Cup Qualification ===
September 18, 2021
4:00 PM PST
First Round

| Rebels SC | 7-1 | Gremio FC San Diego |
|---|---|---|
| Hoyos; Gutierrez; Arreola | Report | Solabode |

Mira Mesa High School, San Diego, California
October 17, 2021
3:00 PM PST
Second Round

| Rebels SC | 2-3 | Escondido FC |
|---|---|---|
| Hoyos 30'; Kennedy 50' | Report | Hernandez 40'; Velazquez 52'; Rolim De Moura 83' |

Mount Miguel High School, Spring Valley, California

=== 2023 U.S. Open Cup Qualification ===
September 17, 2022
3:00 PM PST
First Round

| Rebels SC | 2-2 (a.e.t.) | Escondido FC |
|---|---|---|
| Rojo 42'; Zambrano 107' | Report | Celestino 69'; Bahena 98' |
Penalties
| | 1-3 |

Mount Miguel High School, Spring Valley, California

=== 2026 U.S. Open Cup Qualification ===
October 12, 2025
3:00 PM PST
Second Round

| City SC San Diego | 9-0 | Rebel SC |
|---|---|---|
| Micheals 17'; Martinez 25' 50'; Sierra 40' 42' 85'; Koptieff 61'; Aguirre 65'; Espanto 86' | Report |

Aviara Community Park, Carlsbad, California
