= 2023 U.S. Open Cup =

108th edition of cup competition in American soccer

2023 Lamar Hunt U.S. Open Cup
Tournament details
- Country: United States
- Dates: March 21 – September 27
- Teams: 99

Final positions
- Champions: Houston Dynamo FC; (2nd title)
- Runners-up: Inter Miami CF

Tournament statistics
- Matches played: 97
- Goals scored: 183 (1.89 per match)
- Top goal scorers: Josh Dolling; Damir Kreilach; (4 goals each)

The 2023 Lamar Hunt U.S. Open Cup was the 108th edition of the U.S. Open Cup, the knockout domestic cup competition of American soccer. The 2023 field featured 99 teams, including a modern-era record 71 professional sides. Orlando City SC were the defending champions, but were eliminated in the round of 32 by Charlotte FC.

Houston Dynamo FC won their second U.S. Open Cup title after defeating Inter Miami CF 2–1 in the final, held at DRV PNK Stadium in Fort Lauderdale on September 27.

== Schedule ==
Schedule for 2023 Lamar Hunt U.S. Open Cup
Round	Draw date	Match day	Entrants	Teams entered to date
First round	February 3	March 21–23, 2023	Open Division teams	28
Second round	February 16	April 4–11, 2023	14 winners from First Round; 21 Division III teams 24 USLC teams	73
Third round	April 6	April 25–26, 2023	30 winners from Second Round; 18 MLS teams	91
Round of 32	April 27	May 9–10, 2023	24 winners from Third Round; 4 MLS teams competing in the 2023 CONCACAF Champions League; 4 next-best MLS teams	99
Round of 16	May 11	May 23–24, 2023	16 winners from Round of 32	99
Quarterfinal	May 11	June 6–7, 2023	8 winners from Round of 16	99
Semifinals	June 8	August 23, 2023	4 winners from Quarterfinals	99
Final	June 8	September 27, 2023	2 winners from Semifinals	99

== Teams ==
Professional teams that are majority-owned or controlled by higher-division professional clubs are barred from entering the competition. On March 10, 2023, Rochester New York FC announced they would not compete in the 2023 MLS Next Pro season, and were in fact ceasing operations.

=== Table ===
**Enter in First Round**		**Enter in Second Round**		**Enter in Third Round**	**Enter in Round of 32**
**Open Division**		**Division III**	**Division II**	**Division I**	
**USCS/USASA/USSSA/ANFEEU**; 10 teams	**NPSL/USL2**; 18 teams	**MLS Next Pro/NISA/USL1**; ~~22 teams~~ 21 teams	**USL Championship**; 24 teams	**MLS**; 26 teams	
National Amateur Cup: Bavarian United SC (MWPL); Local Qualifiers: Beaman United FC (UPSL); Capo FC (NISAN); Chicago House AC (MWPL); Club de Lyon 2 (NISAN); International San Francisco SC (SFSFL); Lansdowne Yonkers (EPSL); Miami United FC (NSL); UDA Soccer (UPSL); West Chester United (USLP)	NPSL: Appalachian FC; Cleveland SC; Crossfire Redmond; El Farolito SC; FC Motown; Hartford City FC; Jacksonville Armada U-23; Tulsa Athletic $ (Note: Open division team with the most victories against opponents from two divisions higher.); USL2: Brazos Valley Cavalry FC; Des Moines Menace; Lionsbridge FC; Manhattan SC; Nona FC; North Carolina Fusion U23; Ocean City Nor'easters; Park City Red Wolves SC; Project 51O; Ventura County Fusion	MLS Next Pro: ~~Rochester New York FC~~; NISA: Albion San Diego; Flower City Union; Chattanooga FC; Club de Lyon; Gold Star FC Detroit; Los Angeles Force; Maryland Bobcats FC; Michigan Stars FC; Savannah Clovers FC; USL1: Central Valley Fuego FC; Charlotte Independence; Chattanooga Red Wolves SC; Forward Madison FC; Greenville Triumph SC; Lexington SC; North Carolina FC; Northern Colorado Hailstorm FC $ (Note: Split between three Division III teams with the most victories against opponents from one division higher, $8,333 each.); One Knoxville SC; Richmond Kickers; South Georgia Tormenta FC $; Union Omaha $	Birmingham Legion FC; Charleston Battery; Colorado Springs Switchbacks FC; Detroit City FC; El Paso Locomotive FC; Hartford Athletic; Indy Eleven; Las Vegas Lights FC; Loudoun United FC; Louisville City FC; Memphis 901 FC; Miami FC; Monterey Bay FC; New Mexico United; Oakland Roots SC; Orange County SC; Phoenix Rising FC; Pittsburgh Riverhounds SC $ (Note: Division II team with the most victories against opponents from one division higher.); Rio Grande Valley FC; Sacramento Republic FC; San Antonio FC; San Diego Loyal SC; Tampa Bay Rowdies; FC Tulsa	Atlanta United FC; Charlotte FC; Chicago Fire FC; Colorado Rapids; FC Cincinnati; Columbus Crew; D.C. United; Houston Dynamo FC $$$; Inter Miami CF $$; Minnesota United FC; Nashville SC; New England Revolution; Portland Timbers; Real Salt Lake; San Jose Earthquakes; Seattle Sounders FC; Sporting Kansas City; St. Louis City SC	Austin FC; FC Dallas; LA Galaxy; Los Angeles FC; New York City FC; New York Red Bulls; Orlando City SC; Philadelphia Union

- **Bold** denotes team is still active in the tournament.
- $: Winner of $25,000 bonus for advancing the furthest in the competition from their respective divisions.
- $$: Winner of $100,000 for being the runner-up in the competition.
- $$$: Winner of $300,000 for winning the competition.

=== Map ===
Locations of teams in the tournament proper.
- MLS
- USLC
- Division 3 (NISA/USL1)
- Open Division (NPSL/USL2)
- Local Qualifiers & National Amateur Cup Champion
- Multiple Teams

Metro areas with multiple teams:

- Charlotte: Charlotte FC (MLS), Charlotte Independence (USL1)
- Chattanooga: Chattanooga FC (NISA), Chattanooga Red Wolves SC (USL1)
- Chicago: Chicago Fire FC (MLS), Chicago House AC (Local)
- Detroit: Detroit City FC (USLC), Michigan Stars FC (NISA), Gold Star FC Detroit (NISA)
- Hartford: Hartford Athletic (USLC), Hartford City FC (NPSL)
- Los Angeles: Los Angeles FC (MLS), LA Galaxy (MLS), Orange County SC (USLC), Los Angeles Force (NISA)
- Miami: Inter Miami CF (MLS), Miami FC (USLC), Miami United FC (Local)
- Nashville: Nashville SC (MLS), Beaman United FC (Local)
- New York City: New York City FC (MLS), New York Red Bulls (MLS), Manhattan SC (USL2), FC Motown (NPSL), Lansdowne Yonkers FC (Local)
- Orlando: Orlando City SC (MLS), Club de Lyon (NISA), Nona FC (USL2), Club de Lyon 2 (Local)
- Philadelphia: Philadelphia Union (MLS), West Chester United SC (USL2)
- San Diego: San Diego Loyal SC (USLC), Albion San Diego (NISA)
- San Francisco Bay Area: San Jose Earthquakes (MLS), Oakland Roots SC (USLC), Project 51O (USL2), El Farolito SC (NPSL), Inter San Francisco (Local)
- Seattle: Seattle Sounders FC (MLS), Crossfire Redmond (NPSL)
- Tulsa: FC Tulsa (USLC), Tulsa Athletic (NPSL)
- Washington D.C.: D.C. United (MLS), Loudoun United FC (USLC)

=== Number of teams by state ===
A total of 34 states and the District of Columbia are represented by clubs in the U.S. Open Cup this year.

	States	Number	Teams
1	California	16	Albion San Diego, Capo FC, Central Valley Fuego FC, El Farolito SC , International San Francisco, LA Galaxy, Los Angeles FC, Los Angeles Force, Monterey Bay FC, Oakland Roots SC, Orange County SC, Project 51O, Sacramento Republic FC, San Diego Loyal SC, San Jose Earthquakes, Ventura County Fusion
2	Florida	9	Club de Lyon, Club de Lyon 2, Inter Miami CF, Jacksonville Armada U-23, Miami FC, Miami United FC, Nona FC, Orlando City SC, Tampa Bay Rowdies
3	Texas	7	Austin FC, Brazos Valley Cavalry FC, FC Dallas, El Paso Locomotive FC, Houston Dynamo FC, Rio Grande Valley FC, San Antonio FC
4	Tennessee	6	Beaman United FC, Chattanooga FC, Chattanooga Red Wolves SC, Memphis 901 FC, Nashville SC, One Knoxville SC
5	North Carolina	5	Appalachian FC, Charlotte FC, Charlotte Independence, North Carolina FC, North Carolina Fusion U23
6	New York	4	City Union, Lansdowne Yonkers FC, Manhattan SC, New York City FC
7	Colorado	3	Colorado Rapids, Colorado Springs Switchbacks FC, Northern Colorado Hailstorm FC
7	Georgia	3	Atlanta United FC, South Georgia Tormenta FC, Savannah Clovers FC
7	Michigan	3	Detroit City FC, Gold Star FC Detroit, Michigan Stars FC
7	New Jersey	3	FC Motown, New York Red Bulls, Ocean City Nor'easters
7	Ohio	3	FC Cincinnati, Cleveland SC, Columbus Crew
7	Pennsylvania	3	Philadelphia Union, Pittsburgh Riverhounds SC, West Chester United SC
7	Virginia	3	Lionsbridge FC, Loudoun United FC, Richmond Kickers
14	Connecticut	2	Hartford Athletic, Hartford City FC
14	Illinois	2	Chicago Fire FC, Chicago House AC
14	Kentucky	2	Louisville City FC, Lexington SC
14	New Mexico	2	New Mexico United, UDA Soccer
14	Oklahoma	2	FC Tulsa, Tulsa Athletic
14	South Carolina	2	Charleston Battery, Greenville Triumph SC
14	Utah	2	Park City Red Wolves SC, Real Salt Lake
14	Washington	2	Crossfire Redmond, Seattle Sounders FC
14	Wisconsin	2	Forward Madison FC, Bavarian United SC
23	Arizona	1	Phoenix Rising FC
23	Alabama	1	Birmingham Legion FC
23	District of Columbia	1	D.C. United
23	Indiana	1	Indy Eleven
23	Iowa	1	Des Moines Menace
23	Kansas	1	Sporting Kansas City
23	Maryland	1	Maryland Bobcats FC
23	Massachusetts	1	New England Revolution
23	Minnesota	1	Minnesota United FC
23	Missouri	1	St. Louis City SC
23	Nebraska	1	Union Omaha
23	Nevada	1	Las Vegas Lights FC
23	Oregon	1	Portland Timbers

States without a team in the Open Cup: Alaska, Arkansas, Delaware, Hawaii, Idaho, Louisiana, Maine, Mississippi, Montana, New Hampshire, North Dakota, Rhode Island, South Dakota, Vermont, West Virginia, and Wyoming.

=== Open Cup debuts ===
21 teams made their Open Cup debuts in the 2023 tournament.

- MLS: St. Louis City SC
- USLC: Loudoun United FC
- NISA: Club de Lyon, Gold Star FC Detroit, Savannah Clovers FC
- USL1: Lexington SC, One Knoxville SC
- NPSL: Appalachian FC, Crossfire Redmond, Jacksonville Armada U-23
- USL2: Lionsbridge FC, Manhattan SC, Nona FC, Project 51O
- UPSL: Beaman United FC, UDA Soccer
- Other Open Division: Capo FC, Chicago House AC, Club de Lyon 2, Inter San Francisco, West Chester United SC

== First and Second Rounds ==
The complete draw for the First round, including match dates and times, was announced on February 3, 2023.

The draw for the Second round pairings and hosting scenarios was announced on February 16, 2023.

=== Bracket ===
First round March 21–23
**NPSL**	**(California) El Farolito SC (a.e.t.)**	**3**
LQ	(California) Inter San Francisco	0
LQ	(Pennsylvania) West Chester United SC	1
**USL2**	**(New Jersey) Ocean City Nor'easters**	**3**
LQ	(Florida) Club de Lyon 2	0
**USL2**	**(Florida) Nona FC**	**1**
**NPSL**	**(North Carolina) Appalachian FC (p)**	**2 (3)**
USL2	North Carolina Fusion U23	2 (0)
**USL2**	**(New York (state)) Manhattan SC (a.e.t.)**	**2**
NPSL	(New Jersey) FC Motown	1
**LQ**	**(Illinois) Chicago House AC**	**1**
NAC	(Wisconsin) Bavarian United SC	0
LQ	(Tennessee) Beaman United FC	0
**USL2**	**(Iowa) Des Moines Menace**	**3**
**NPSL**	**(Oklahoma) Tulsa Athletic**	**1**
USL2	(Texas) Brazos Valley Cavalry FC	0
**LQ**	**(New Mexico) UDA Soccer**	**1**
USL2	(Utah) Park City Red Wolves SC	0
USL2	(California) Project 51O	0
**NPSL**	**(Washington (state)) Crossfire Redmond**	**3**
**NPSL**	**(Ohio) Cleveland SC**	**1**
USL2	(Virginia) Lionsbridge FC	0
**NPSL**	**(Florida) Jacksonville Armada U-23 (p)**	**1 (9)**
LQ	(Florida) Miami United FC	1 (8)
NPSL	(Connecticut) Hartford City FC	1
**LQ**	**(New York (state)) Lansdowne Yonkers FC (a.e.t.)**	**2**
USL2	(California) Ventura County Fusion	1
**LQ**	**(California) Capo FC**	**4**

Second round April 4–11
**USLC**	**(California) Oakland Roots SC**	**3**
NPSL	(California) El Farolito SC	1
**USL1**	**(Nebraska) Union Omaha**	**2**
USLC	(Texas) El Paso Locomotive FC	0
**NISA**	**Maryland Bobcats FC (a.e.t.)**	**3**
USL2	(New Jersey) Ocean City Nor'easters	2
USL1	(California) Central Valley Fuego FC	1
**USLC**	**(California) Monterey Bay FC (a.e.t.)**	**3**
**USLC**	**(Florida) Tampa Bay Rowdies**	**2**
USL2	(Florida) Nona FC	0
**USLC**	**(Michigan) Detroit City FC**	**1**
NISA	(Michigan) Gold Star FC Detroit	0
**USL1**	**(North Carolina) Charlotte Independence**	**2**
NPSL	(North Carolina) Appalachian FC	0
**USLC**	**(Indiana) Indy Eleven (a.e.t.)**	**3**
NISA	Michigan Stars FC	1
**USLC**	**(Kentucky) Louisville City FC**	**1**
USL1	(Kentucky) Lexington SC	0
**NISA**	**(New York (state)) Flower City Union**	**3**
USL2	(New York (state)) Manhattan SC	1
**USLC**	**(Virginia) Loudoun United FC (a.e.t.)**	**2**
USL1	North Carolina FC	1
USL1	(Wisconsin) Forward Madison FC	2
**LQ**	**(Illinois) Chicago House AC (a.e.t.)**	**3**
**USLC**	(Pennsylvania) **Pittsburgh Riverhounds SC**	**w/o**
MLSNP	(New York (state)) ~~Rochester New York FC~~
USL2	(Iowa) Des Moines Menace	1
**NISA**	**(Tennessee) Chattanooga FC**	**4**
**USLC**	**(South Carolina) Charleston Battery**	**4**
NISA	(Georgia (U.S. state)) Savannah Clovers FC	1
USLC	(Oklahoma) FC Tulsa	0
**NPSL**	**(Oklahoma) Tulsa Athletic**	**1**
NISA	(Florida) Club de Lyon (D3)	1
**USLC**	**(Texas) San Antonio FC (a.e.t.)**	**2**
USL1	(Tennessee) One Knoxville SC	1
**USLC**	**(Tennessee) Memphis 901 FC (a.e.t.)**	**2**
**USLC**	**New Mexico United**	**6**
LQ	(New Mexico) UDA Soccer	0
USL1	(Tennessee) Chattanooga Red Wolves SC	1
**USLC**	**(Alabama) Birmingham Legion FC**	**4**
**USLC**	**(California) Sacramento Republic FC (a.e.t.)**	**5**
NPSL	(Washington (state)) Crossfire Redmond	4
**USL1**	**(Georgia (U.S. state)) South Georgia Tormenta FC**	**2**
USLC	(Texas) Rio Grande Valley FC Toros	1
**USL1**	**(Virginia) Richmond Kickers**	**3**
NPSL	(Ohio) Cleveland SC	2
USLC	Colorado Springs Switchbacks FC	1
**USL1**	**Northern Colorado Hailstorm FC (a.e.t.)**	**3**
**USLC**	**(Nevada) Las Vegas Lights FC**	**4**
NISA	(California) Los Angeles Force	0
**USLC**	**(Florida) Miami FC**	**3**
NPSL	(Florida) Jacksonville Armada U-23	1
**USLC**	**(California) San Diego Loyal SC**	**2**
NISA	(California) Albion San Diego	0
**USLC**	**(Connecticut) Hartford Athletic**	**3**
LQ	(New York (state)) Lansdowne Yonkers FC	0
**USLC**	**(Arizona) Phoenix Rising FC**	**1**
USL1	(South Carolina) Greenville Triumph SC	0
**USLC**	**(California) Orange County SC**	**5**
LQ	(California) Capo FC	0

Host team listed first
Bold = winner
(a.e.t.) = after extra time, (p) = penalty shootout score

=== First round ===
All times local to game site.

March 21	West Chester United SC (LQ) **(Pennsylvania)**	**1–3**	**(New Jersey) Ocean City Nor'easters (USL2)**	Wayne, Pennsylvania
7:30 pm EDT	Reese 12'	Report	Latorre 18'; Evande 60'; Sabino 67' (pen.)	Stadium: YSC Sport; Attendance: 377; Referee: Joshua Encarnación

March 22	**El Farolito SC (NPSL) (California)**	**3–0** (a.e.t.)	**(California)** International San Francisco SC (LQ)	Fremont, California
2:30 pm PDT	Mosquera 94'; Quiñones 99'; Benitez 113'	Report		Stadium: Ohlone College Soccer Stadium; Attendance: 200; Referee: Pedro Vasquez-Luna

March 22	Club de Lyon 2 (LQ) **(Florida)**	**0–1**	**(Florida) Nona FC (USL2)**	Kissimmee, Florida
7:00 pm EDT		Report	Eyang 1'	Stadium: Austin-Tindall Sports Complex; Attendance: 350; Referee: Alexandra Billeter

March 22	**Appalachian FC (NPSL) (North Carolina)**	**2–2** (a.e.t.) (**3–0** p)	**(North Carolina)** North Carolina Fusion U23 (USL2)	Boone, North Carolina
7:00 pm EDT	Holbrook 1', 32'	Report	Fernandez 38'; Ferreira 79'	Stadium: Ted Mackorell Soccer Complex; Attendance: 1,811; Referee: Emma Richards
	**Penalties**
	Landau (penalty scored); Arguello (penalty scored); de Lange (penalty scored)		(penalty missed) Neijenhuis; (penalty missed) Leray; (penalty missed) Bethell

March 22	**Manhattan SC (USL2) (New York (state))**	**2–1** (a.e.t.)	**(New Jersey)** FC Motown (NPSL)	Bronx, New York
7:00 pm EDT	Karamoko 55'; Lulka 106'	Report	Catania 26'	Stadium: Marillac Field (College of Mt. St. Vincent); Attendance: 104; Referee: Christian Centeno

March 22	**Chicago House AC (LQ) (Illinois)**	**1–0**	**(Wisconsin)** Bavarian United SC (NAC)	Elmhurst, Illinois
7:00 pm CDT	Makowiecki 39'	Report		Stadium: Langhorst Field (Elmhurst University); Attendance: 310; Referee: Peter Bernardy

March 22	Beaman United FC (LQ) **(Tennessee)**	**0–3**	**(Iowa) Des Moines Menace (USL2)**	Murfreesboro, Tennessee
7:00 pm CDT		Report	Rodriguez 21', 57' (pen.); Garcia 90+5'	Stadium: Dean A. Hayes Track & Soccer Stadium (MTSU); Attendance: 400; Referee: Benjamin Meyer

March 22	**Tulsa Athletic (NPSL) (Oklahoma)**	**1–0**	**(Texas)** Brazos Valley Cavalry FC (USL2)	Tulsa, Oklahoma
7:00 pm CDT	Cvetanović 31'	Report		Stadium: Hicks Park; Attendance: 400; Referee: Matthew Corrigan

March 22	**UDA Soccer (LQ) (New Mexico)**	**1–0**	**(Utah)** Park City Red Wolves SC (USL2)	Las Cruces, New Mexico
7:00 pm MDT	Puente 79' (pen.)	Report		Stadium: New Mexico State Soccer Field; Attendance: 439; Referee: Cristian Campo Hernández

March 22	Project 51O (USL2) **(California)**	**0–3**	**(Washington (state)) Crossfire Redmond (NPSL)**	Fremont, California
7:00 pm PDT		Report	Hauswirth 49'; Howard 85'; Haddadi 90+5'	Stadium: Ohlone College Soccer Field; Attendance: 280; Referee: Brian Cordova

March 22	Ventura County Fusion (USL2) **(California)**	**1–4**	**(California) Capo FC (LQ)**	Ventura, California
7:00 pm PDT	Desdunes 6'	Report	Gallardo 16'; Mota 45+3', 77'; Scalzo 53'	Stadium: Ventura College Sportscomplex; Attendance: 50; Referee: Irving Navarro

March 23	**Cleveland SC (NPSL) (Ohio)**	**1–0**	**(Virginia)** Lionsbridge FC (USL2)	North Olmsted, Ohio
7:00 pm EDT	Cvecko 45+1'	Report		Stadium: North Olmsted High School; Attendance: 200; Referee: Kevin Fikar

March 23	**Jacksonville Armada U-23 (NPSL) (Florida)**	**1–1** (a.e.t.) (**9–8** p)	**(Florida)** Miami United FC (LQ)	Jacksonville, Florida
7:00 pm EDT	Thomas 43'	Report	Dominguez 49'	Stadium: Hodges Stadium; Attendance: 3,526; Referee: Richonne Clark
	**Penalties**
	Johnson (penalty scored); Kobiljar (penalty scored); West (penalty scored); Palushi (penalty scored); Smoak (penalty scored); Walker (penalty scored); Redmore (penalty scored); Penzone (penalty missed); Abreu (penalty scored); Rulle (penalty scored)		(penalty scored) Grande Jr; (penalty scored) Espitia; (penalty scored) Esono; (penalty scored) Insúa; (penalty scored) Fraggetti; (penalty scored) Rivas; (penalty scored) Shelton; (penalty missed) Benito; (penalty scored) Callejas; (penalty missed) Occenat

March 23	Hartford City FC (NPSL) **(Connecticut)**	**1–2**	**(New York (state)) Lansdowne Yonkers FC (LQ)**	Hartford, Connecticut
7:30 pm EDT	Guerra 28' (pen.)	Report	Devivo 45+1', 73'	Stadium: Trinity Health Stadium; Attendance: 500; Referee: Thomas Snyder

=== Second round ===
All times local to game site.

April 4	**Miami FC (USLC) (Florida)**	**3–1**	**(Florida)** Jacksonville Armada U-23(NPSL)	Miami, Florida
7:00 PM EDT	Telfer 34'; Repetto 82', 85' (pen.)	Report	Eloundou 33'	Stadium: FIU Soccer Stadium; Attendance: 654; Referee: Jonathan Bilinski

April 4	**Hartford Athletic (USLC) (Connecticut)**	**3–0**	**(New York (state))** Lansdowne Yonkers FC (LQ)	Hartford, Connecticut
7:00 PM EDT	Amoh 27', 73' (pen.), 82'	Report		Stadium: Trinity Health Stadium; Attendance: 500; Referee: Ernie Constantine

April 4	One Knoxville SC (USL1) **(Tennessee)**	**1–2** (a.e.t.)	**(Tennessee) Memphis 901 FC (USLC)**	Knoxville, Tennessee
7:00 PM EDT	Ilić 57' (pen.)	Report	Borczak 38'; Kelly 120+4'	Stadium: Regal Soccer Stadium; Attendance: 1,812; Referee: Matthew Thompson

April 4	**Charleston Battery (USLC) (South Carolina)**	**4–1**	**(Georgia (U.S. state))** Savannah Clovers FC (NISA)	Mount Pleasant, South Carolina
7:00 PM EDT	Crawford 37'; Williams 51'; Trager 63'; Markanich 77'	Report	Sanchez 76'	Stadium: Patriots Point; Attendance: 1,617; Referee: Amiel Aleman

April 4	**Detroit City FC (USLC) (Michigan)**	**1–0**	**(Michigan)** Gold Star FC Detroit (NISA)	Hamtramck, Michigan
7:30 PM EDT	Matthews 43'	Report		Stadium: Keyworth Stadium; Attendance: 1,361; Referee: Joshua Encarnación

April 4	**Tampa Bay Rowdies (USLC) (Florida)**	**2–0**	**(Florida)** Nona FC (USL2)	St. Petersburg, Florida
7:30 PM EDT	Williams 26'; Mkosana 33'	Report		Stadium: Al Lang Stadium; Attendance: 2,023; Referee: Joe Surgan

April 4	**Flower City Union (NISA) (New York (state))**	**3–1**	**(New York (state))** Manhattan SC (USL2)	Rochester, New York
7:30 PM EDT	Elias 36', 42'; Diakhate 82'	Report	Karamoko 71'	Stadium: Rochester Community Sports Complex Stadium; Attendance: 751; Referee: Andrew Musashe

April 4	**San Antonio FC (USLC) (Texas)**	**2–1** (a.e.t.)	**(Florida)** Club de Lyon (NISA)	San Antonio, Texas
7:30 PM CDT	Agustin 79'; Holt 98' (pen.)	Report	Hernández 61'	Stadium: Toyota Field; Attendance: 3,204; Referee: Elton García

April 4	**New Mexico United (USLC)**	**6–0**	**(New Mexico)** UDA Soccer (LQ)	Rio Rancho, New Mexico
7:00 PM MDT	Sosa 2'; Portillo 40' (pen.); Dolling 48', 61' (pen.), 73'; Bruce 54'	Report		Stadium: Rio Rancho High School; Attendance: 1,680; Referee: Matt Geringer

April 4	**Oakland Roots SC (USLC) (California)**	**3–1**	**(California)** El Farolito SC (NPSL)	Hayward, California
7:00 PM PDT	Rodriguez 12'; Prentice 19', 24'	Report	Delgado 45' (pen.)	Stadium: Pioneer Stadium; Attendance: 875; Referee: Christopher Calderon

April 5	**Charlotte Independence (USL1) (North Carolina)**	**2–0**	**(North Carolina)** Appalachian FC (NPSL)	Matthews, North Carolina
7:00 PM EDT	Bennett 25' (pen.); Dimick 66'	Report		Stadium: Mecklenburg County Sportsplex; Attendance: 2,564; Referee: Daniel Gutierrez

April 5	**Indy Eleven (USLC) (Indiana)**	**3–1** (a.e.t.)	**(Michigan)** Michigan Stars FC (NISA)	Indianapolis, Indiana
7:00 PM EDT	Robledo 59'; Diz 92'; Tejada 106'	Report	Popovic 47'	Stadium: Michael A. Carroll Stadium; Attendance: 1,807; Referee: Alex Beehler

April 5	**Pittsburgh Riverhounds SC (USLC) (Pennsylvania)**	**1–0** **forfeit**	**(New York (state))** ~~Rochester New York FC~~ (MLSNP)	Pittsburgh, Pennsylvania
7:00 PM EDT		Report		Stadium: Highmark Stadium
Note: Pittsburgh advanced on walkover due to Rochester New York FC ceasing operations on March 10, 2023.

April 5	**Louisville City FC (USLC) (Kentucky)**	**1–0**	**(Kentucky)** Lexington SC (USL1)	Louisville, Kentucky
7:00 PM EDT	Totsch 69'	Report		Stadium: Lynn Family Stadium; Attendance: 4,205; Referee: Nabil Bensalah

April 5	**Loudoun United FC (USLC) (Virginia)**	**2–1** (a.e.t.)	**(North Carolina)** North Carolina FC (USL1)	Leesburg, Virginia
7:00 PM EDT	Ryan 7'; Leggett 116'	Report	Servania 67'	Stadium: Segra Field; Attendance: 2,779; Referee: Kenneth Rojas

April 5	**Maryland Bobcats FC (NISA)**	**3–2** (a.e.t.)	**(New Jersey)** Ocean City Nor'easters (USL2)	Boyds, Maryland
7:00 PM EDT	Espinal 67' (pen.), 82'; Brown 120+3'	Report	Jackson 22'; Labutis 90+2'	Stadium: Maryland SoccerPlex; Attendance: 167; Referee: Luis Arroyo

April 5	Chattanooga Red Wolves SC (USL1) **(Tennessee)**	**1–4**	**(Alabama) Birmingham Legion FC (USLC)**	East Ridge, Tennessee
7:30 PM EDT	Lombardi 79'	Report	Agudelo 45+1', 63'; Smith 47'; Nwegbo 87'	Stadium: CHI Memorial Stadium; Attendance: 500; Referee: Benjamin Meyer

April 5	**South Georgia Tormenta FC (USL1) (Georgia (U.S. state))**	**2–1**	**(Texas)** Rio Grande Valley FC Toros (USLC)	Statesboro, Georgia
7:30 PM EDT	Murphy 39'; Adjei 82'	Report	Ruiz 90+1'	Stadium: Optim Sports Medicine Field; Attendance: 1,139; Referee: William Hale

April 5	Des Moines Menace (USL2) **(Iowa)**	**1–4**	**(Tennessee) Chattanooga FC (NISA)**	West Des Moines, Iowa
7:00 PM CDT	Garcia 69'	Report	Naglestad 23'; Rodriguez 35'; McGrath 72'; Louis 85'	Stadium: Valley Stadium; Attendance: 1,672; Referee: Chris Ruska

April 5	**Union Omaha (USL1) (Nebraska)**	**2–0**	**(Texas)** El Paso Locomotive FC (USLC)	Omaha, Nebraska
7:00 PM CDT	Palacios 58'; dos Santos 75'	Report		Stadium: Morrison Stadium; Attendance: 548; Referee: Velimir Stefanovic

April 5	**Tulsa Athletic (NPSL) (Oklahoma)**	**1–0**	**(Oklahoma)** FC Tulsa (USLC)	Tulsa, Oklahoma
7:00 CDT	Harris 58'	Report		Stadium: Athletic Community Field at Hicks Park; Attendance: 1,025; Referee: Brandon Gardner

April 5	Colorado Springs Switchbacks FC (USLC) **(Colorado)**	**1–3** (a.e.t.)	**Northern Colorado Hailstorm FC (USL1)**	Colorado Springs, Colorado
7:00 MDT	Skundrich 82'	Report	Amann 88'; Benamna 95'; Hernández 107'	Stadium: Weidner Field; Attendance: 200; Referee: Adam Rice

April 5	**Orange County SC (USLC) (California)**	**5–0**	**(California)** Capo FC (LQ)	Irvine, California
7:00 PM PDT	Nielsen 33'; Jamison 46'; Iloski 69', 93' (pen.); Amang 87'	Report		Stadium: Championship Soccer Stadium; Attendance: 1,588

April 5	**Sacramento Republic FC (USLC) (California)**	**5–4** (a.e.t.)	**(Washington (state))** Crossfire Redmond (NPSL)	Sacramento, California
7:00 PDT	Lewis 81', 105'; Cicerone 85', 97'; Fenwick 113'	Report	Aman 7', 111'; Stewart 13'; Hussen 93'	Stadium: Heart Health Park; Attendance: 4,024; Referee: Turan Ozdemir

April 5	**San Diego Loyal SC (USLC) (California)**	**2–0**	**(California)** Albion San Diego (NISA)	San Diego, California
7:00 PM PDT	Adams 25' (pen.); Conway 52'	Report		Stadium: SDSU Sports Deck; Attendance: 1,200

April 5	Central Valley Fuego FC (USL1) **(California)**	**1–3** (a.e.t.)	**(California) Monterey Bay FC (USLC)**	Fresno, California
7:00 PM PDT	Vasquez 116'	Report	Volesky 97'; Dixon 110'; Gleadle 120'	Stadium: Fresno State Soccer Stadium; Attendance: 3,057

April 5	**Las Vegas Lights FC (USLC) (Nevada)**	**4–0**	**(California)** Los Angeles Force (NISA)	Las Vegas, Nevada
7:00 PM PDT	Gonzalez 16', 23'; Ingram 37'; Torres 63'	Report		Stadium: Peter Johann Soccer Field; Attendance: 287; Referee: Brad Jensen

April 5	**Phoenix Rising FC (USLC) (Arizona)**	**1–0**	**(South Carolina)** Greenville Triumph SC (USL1)	Phoenix, Arizona
7:30 PM MST	Harvey 21'	Report		Stadium: Phoenix Rising Soccer Stadium; Attendance: 5,000; Referee: Brandon Stevis

April 6	**Richmond Kickers (USL1) (Virginia)**	**3–2**	**(Ohio)** Cleveland SC (NPSL)	Richmond, Virginia
7:00 EDT	Terzaghi 31', 59'; Barnathan 79'	Report	Beck 80'; Harter 86'	Stadium: City Stadium; Attendance: 1,013; Referee: Christian Centeno

April 11	Forward Madison FC (USL1) **(Wisconsin)**	**2–3** (a.e.t.)	**(Illinois) Chicago House AC (LQ)**	Madison, Wisconsin
6:00 PM CDT	Onen 19'; Vásquez 48'	Report	Mann 75'; Smith Jr 90+2', 103'	Stadium: Breese Stevens Field; Attendance: 1,802; Referee: Calin Radosav
Note: Game rescheduled from its original date of April 4 due to expected inclement weather.

== Third round ==
The 30 second round winners and the 18 new teams from the MLS were pooled into 11 geographic regions for the third round draw that was conducted on April 6, 2023. All new MLS entrants were drawn to face a second round winner and no MLS vs. MLS match-ups were allowed in the third round. The 24 resulting matches were played on April 25 and 26.

=== Teams ===
Teams for Third Round draw
Previous round winners	New entrants (MLS)
Birmingham Legion FC (USLC); Charleston Battery (USLC); Detroit City FC (USLC); Hartford Athletic (USLC); Indy Eleven (USLC); Las Vegas Lights FC (USLC); Loudoun United FC (USLC); Louisville City FC (USLC); Memphis 901 FC (USLC); Miami FC (USLC); Monterey Bay FC (USLC); New Mexico United (USLC); Oakland Roots SC (USLC); Orange County SC (USLC); Phoenix Rising FC (USLC); Pittsburgh Riverhounds SC (USLC); Sacramento Republic FC (USLC); San Antonio FC (USLC); San Diego Loyal SC (USLC); Tampa Bay Rowdies (USLC); Chattanooga FC (NISA); Flower City Union (NISA); Maryland Bobcats FC (NISA); Charlotte Independence (USL1); Northern Colorado Hailstorm FC (USL1); Richmond Kickers (USL1); South Georgia Tormenta FC (USL1); Union Omaha (USL1); Tulsa Athletic (NPSL); Chicago House AC (LQ)	Atlanta United FC; Charlotte FC; Chicago Fire FC; Colorado Rapids; FC Cincinnati; Columbus Crew; D.C. United; Houston Dynamo FC; Inter Miami CF; Minnesota United FC; Nashville SC; New England Revolution; Portland Timbers; Real Salt Lake; San Jose Earthquakes; Seattle Sounders FC; Sporting Kansas City; St. Louis City SC

=== Groups ===
Draw groups
Atlantic	Southeast	Midwest	East	North	Northeast
Charleston Battery (USLC); Charlotte FC (MLS); Charlotte Independence (USL1); South Georgia Tormenta FC (USL1)	Houston Dynamo FC (MLS); Inter Miami CF (MLS); Miami FC (USLC); Tampa Bay Rowdies (USLC)	Sporting Kansas City (MLS); St. Louis City SC (MLS); Tulsa Athletic (NPSL); Union Omaha (USL1)	D.C. United (MLS); Maryland Bobcats FC (NISA); Pittsburgh Riverhounds SC (USLC); Richmond Kickers (USL1)	Chicago Fire FC (MLS); Detroit City FC (USLC); Chicago House AC (LQ); Minnesota United FC (MLS)	Flower City Union (NISA); Hartford Athletic (USLC); Loudoun United FC (USLC); New England Revolution (MLS)
Central	South	Mountain	Pacific	West	
Columbus Crew (MLS); FC Cincinnati (MLS); Indy Eleven (USLC); Louisville City FC (USLC)	Atlanta United FC (MLS); Birmingham Legion FC (USLC); Chattanooga FC (NISA); Memphis 901 FC (USLC); Nashville SC (MLS); San Antonio FC (USLC)	Colorado Rapids (MLS); Las Vegas Lights FC (USLC); New Mexico United (USLC); Northern Colorado Hailstorm FC (USL1); Phoenix Rising FC (USLC); Real Salt Lake (MLS)	Orange County SC (USLC); Portland Timbers (MLS); San Diego Loyal SC (USLC); Seattle Sounders FC (MLS)	Monterey Bay FC (USLC); Oakland Roots SC (USLC); Sacramento Republic FC (USLC); San Jose Earthquakes (MLS)	

=== Third Round ===
All times local to game site.

April 25	Pittsburgh Riverhounds SC (USLC) (Pennsylvania)	2–0	(Maryland) Maryland Bobcats FC (NISA)	Pittsburgh, Pennsylvania
7:00 PM EDT	Kizza 81'; Fahling 90+1'	Report		Stadium: Highmark Stadium; Attendance: 100; Referee: Alex Parent

April 25	Charleston Battery (USLC) (South Carolina)	1–0 (a.e.t.)	(North Carolina) Charlotte Independence (USL1)	Mount Pleasant, South Carolina
7:00 PM EDT	Markanich 112'	Report		Stadium: Patriots Point Soccer Complex; Attendance: 1,151; Referee: Andrew Musashe

April 25	New England Revolution (MLS) (Massachusetts)	2–1	(Connecticut) Hartford Athletic (USLC)	Foxborough, Massachusetts
7:30 PM EDT	Rennicks 13'; Romney 76'	Report	Hoppenot 52'	Stadium: Gillette Stadium; Attendance: 1,988; Referee: Jeremy Scheer

April 25	Charlotte FC (MLS) (North Carolina)	4–1	(Georgia (U.S. state)) South Georgia Tormenta FC (USL1)	Matthews, North Carolina
7:30 PM EDT	Jóźwiak 24'; Copetti 55'; Jones 65'; Świderski 84'	Report	Cassini 83'	Stadium: Sportsplex at Matthews; Attendance: 3,568; Referee: Jervis Atagana

April 25	Detroit City FC (USLC) (Michigan)	1–3	Minnesota United FC (MLS)	Hamtramck, Michigan
7:30 PM EDT	Matthews 5'	Report	Fragapane 60'; Iwe 63'; Amarilla 66'	Stadium: Keyworth Stadium; Attendance: 4,529; Referee: Christian Little

April 25	St. Louis City SC (MLS) (Missouri)	5–1	(Nebraska) Union Omaha (USL1)	St. Louis, Missouri
7:00 PM CDT	Jackson 3', 66'; Gallardo 48' (o.g.); Watts 62'; Löwen 86'	Report	Dolabella 79'	Stadium: CityPark; Attendance: 22,423; Referee: Lorenzo Hernandez

April 25	Sporting Kansas City (MLS)	3–0	(Oklahoma) Tulsa Athletic (NPSL)	Kansas City, Kansas
7:30 PM CDT	Sallói 32'; Pulido 54'; Tzionis 68'	Report		Stadium: Children's Mercy Park; Attendance: 9,912; Referee: José Lara

April 25	Monterey Bay FC (USLC) (California)	1–0	(California) San Jose Earthquakes (MLS)	Seaside, California
7:00 PM PDT	Volesky 26'	Report		Stadium: Cardinale Stadium; Attendance: 4,010; Referee: Christopher Calderon

April 26	Loudoun United FC (USLC) (Virginia)	5–0	(New York (state)) Flower City Union (NISA)	Leesburg, Virginia
7:00 PM EDT	Williamson 6', 35'; Ryan 39'; Zanne 49'; ElMedkhar 61'	Report		Stadium: Segra Field; Attendance: 250; Referee: Melvin Rivas

April 26	FC Cincinnati (MLS) (Ohio)	1–0	(Kentucky) Louisville City FC (USLC)	Cincinnati, Ohio
7:00 PM EDT	Ordóñez 85'	Report		Stadium: TQL Stadium; Attendance: 10,062; Referee: Calin Radosav

April 26	Colorado Rapids (MLS)	3–1	(Colorado) Northern Colorado Hailstorm FC (USL1)	Commerce City, Colorado
7:00 PM MDT	Lewis 5', 55'; Max 65'	Report	Dietrich 40'	Stadium: Dick's Sporting Goods Park; Attendance: 200; Referee: Brandon Stevis

April 26	D.C. United (MLS) (Washington, D.C.)	1–0	(Virginia) Richmond Kickers (USL1)	Washington, D.C.
7:30 pm EDT	Asad 52' (pen.)	Report		Stadium: Audi Field; Attendance: 8,686; Referee: John Griggs

April 26	Tampa Bay Rowdies (USLC) (Florida)	0–1	(Texas) Houston Dynamo FC (MLS)	St. Petersburg, Florida
7:30 PM EDT		Report	Raines 44'	Stadium: Al Lang Stadium; Attendance: 1,956; Referee: Elvis Osmanovic

April 26	Miami FC (USLC) (Florida)	2–2 (a.e.t.) (3–5 p)	(Florida) Inter Miami CF (MLS)	Miami, Florida
7:30 PM EDT	Sorto 3'; Yedlin 116' (o.g.)	Report	Borgelin 89'; Sailor 118'	Stadium: Riccardo Silva Stadium; Attendance: 12,099; Referee: Elton García
	Penalties
	Hernández (penalty scored); Craig (penalty scored); Salazar (penalty scored); Telfer (penalty missed)		(penalty scored) Martínez; (penalty scored) Ulloa; (penalty scored) Negri; (penalty scored) Mota; (penalty scored) Miller

April 26	Atlanta United FC (MLS) (Georgia (U.S. state))	1–2 (a.e.t.)	(Tennessee) Memphis 901 FC (USLC)	Kennesaw, Georgia
7:30 PM EDT	Wolff 3'	Report	Goodrum 90+6' (pen.); Pickering 100'	Stadium: Fifth Third Bank Stadium; Attendance: 3,034; Referee: Aleksandar Zhelyazkov

April 26	Columbus Crew (MLS) (Ohio)	1–0	(Indiana) Indy Eleven (USLC)	Columbus, Ohio
7:30 PM EDT	Farsi 83'	Report		Stadium: Lower.com Field; Attendance: 2,000; Referee: Nabil Bensalah

April 26	Birmingham Legion FC (USLC) (Alabama)	1–1 (a.e.t.) (4–3 p)	(Tennessee) Chattanooga FC (NISA)	Tuscaloosa, Alabama
7:00 PM CDT	Kasim 31'	Report	Naglestad 68' (pen.)	Stadium: University of Alabama Soccer Stadium; Attendance: 150; Referee: Abdou Ndiaye
	Penalties
	Pasher (penalty scored); Agudelo (penalty missed); Alves (penalty scored); Rufe (penalty scored); Martínez (penalty scored)		(penalty scored) Naglestad; (penalty missed) Dixon; (penalty scored) Prepeliță; (penalty scored) Mwape; (penalty missed) Alvarenga

April 26	Chicago Fire FC (MLS) (Illinois)	3–0	(Illinois) Chicago House AC (LQ)	Bridgeview, Illinois
7:00 PM CDT	Przybyłko 26'; Burks 37', 70'	Report		Stadium: SeatGeek Stadium; Attendance: 3,421; Referee: Luis Arroyo

April 26	Nashville SC (MLS) (Tennessee)	1–0	(Texas) San Antonio FC (USLC)	Nashville, Tennessee
7:30 PM CDT	Zubak 71'	Report		Stadium: Geodis Park; Attendance: 5,467; Referee: Sergii Demianchuk

April 26	New Mexico United (USLC)	2–1	(Arizona) Phoenix Rising FC (USLC)	Albuquerque, New Mexico
7:00 PM MDT	Hurst 42'; Dolling 87'	Report	Harvey 77'	Stadium: Isotopes Park; Attendance: 4,126; Referee: William Hale

April 26	Las Vegas Lights FC (USLC) (Nevada)	1–3	(Utah) Real Salt Lake (MLS)	Las Vegas, Nevada
7:00 PM PDT	Stauffer 112'	Report	Kreilach 106', 116'; Musovski 121'	Stadium: Cashman Field; Attendance: 300; Referee: Brandon Gardner

April 26	Sacramento Republic FC (USLC) (California)	1–0	(California) Oakland Roots SC (USLC)	Sacramento, California
7:00 PM PDT	Ross 49'	Report		Stadium: Heart Health Park; Attendance: 4,379; Referee: Laura Rodriguez

April 26	Seattle Sounders FC (MLS) (Washington (state))	5–4	(California) San Diego Loyal SC (USLC)	Tukwila, Washington
7:00 PM PDT	Montero 15', 120+3' (pen.); Dobbelaere 26'; Rothrock 55'; Baker-Whiting 101'	Report	Corona 53' (pen.), 73'; Adams 90+3'; Simba 115'	Stadium: Starfire Sports; Attendance: 3,728; Referee: Cristian Campo Hernández

April 26	Portland Timbers (MLS) (Oregon)	3–1	(California) Orange County SC (USLC)	Portland, Oregon
7:30 PM PDT	Loría 37'; Clegg 48'; Niezgoda 90+2'	Report	Iloski 54'	Stadium: Providence Park; Attendance: 11,639; Referee: Olvin Oliva

== Round of 32 ==
The winners of the Third Round and the new entrants to the tournament were grouped geographically into groups of four (eight groups). Each group had one of the MLS teams entering this round. Random selection for each group determined the pairs. Instances where geographical fit did not exist when creating groups was resolved by random selection. The draw for the Round of 32 took place on April 27.

=== Teams ===
Teams for Round of 32 draw
Previous round winners	New entrants (MLS)
Charlotte FC (MLS); Chicago Fire FC (MLS); FC Cincinnati (MLS); Colorado Rapids (MLS); Columbus Crew (MLS); D.C. United (MLS); Houston Dynamo FC (MLS); Inter Miami CF (MLS); Minnesota United FC (MLS); Nashville SC (MLS); New England Revolution (MLS); Portland Timbers (MLS); Real Salt Lake (MLS); Seattle Sounders FC (MLS); Sporting Kansas City (MLS); St. Louis City SC (MLS); Birmingham Legion FC (USLC); Charleston Battery (USLC); Loudoun United FC (USLC); Memphis 901 FC (USLC); Monterey Bay FC (USLC); New Mexico United (USLC); Pittsburgh Riverhounds SC (USLC); Sacramento Republic FC (USLC)	Austin FC; FC Dallas; LA Galaxy; Los Angeles FC; New York City FC; New York Red Bulls; Orlando City SC; Philadelphia Union

=== Groups ===
Draw groups
Group 1	Group 2	Group 3	Group 4	Group 5	Group 6	Group 7	Group 8
Austin FC; Houston Dynamo FC; New Mexico United; Sporting Kansas City	FC Dallas; Birmingham Legion FC; Memphis 901 FC; Nashville SC	LA Galaxy; Portland Timbers; Real Salt Lake; Seattle Sounders FC	Los Angeles FC; Colorado Rapids; Monterey Bay FC; Sacramento Republic FC	New York City FC; Columbus Crew; FC Cincinnati; Loudoun United FC	New York Red Bulls; D.C. United; New England Revolution; Pittsburgh Riverhounds SC	Orlando City SC; Charleston Battery; Charlotte FC; Inter Miami CF	Philadelphia Union; Chicago Fire FC; Minnesota United FC; St. Louis City SC

=== Matches ===
All times local to game site.

May 9	Inter Miami CF (MLS) (Florida)	1–0	(South Carolina) Charleston Battery (USLC)	Fort Lauderdale, Florida
7:00 PM EDT	Palma 48' (o.g.)	Report		Stadium: DRV PNK Stadium; Attendance: 2,726; Referee: Jonathan Bilinski

May 9	Charlotte FC (MLS) (North Carolina)	1–0	(Florida) Orlando City SC (MLS)	Matthews, North Carolina
7:00 PM EDT	Jóźwiak 70'	Report		Stadium: Mecklenburg County Sportsplex at Matthews; Attendance: 4,024; Referee: Guido Gonzales Jr.

May 9	New York Red Bulls (MLS) (New Jersey)	1–0	(Washington, D.C.) D.C. United (MLS)	Montclair, New Jersey
7:30 PM EDT	Fernandez 28'	Report		Stadium: MSU Soccer Park; Attendance: 2,396; Referee: Marcos de Oliveira

May 9	New England Revolution (MLS) (Massachusetts)	0–1	(Pennsylvania) Pittsburgh Riverhounds SC (USLC)	Foxborough, Massachusetts
7:30 PM EDT		Report	Griffin 44'	Stadium: Gillette Stadium; Attendance: 1,100; Referee: Matthew Thompson

May 9	Chicago Fire FC (MLS) (Illinois)	2–1	(Missouri) St. Louis City SC (MLS)	Bridgeview, Illinois
7:00 PM CDT	Haile-Selassie 3'; Herbers 75'	Report	Perez 90+3'	Stadium: SeatGeek Stadium; Attendance: 4,371; Referee: Brandon Stevis

May 9	Minnesota United FC (MLS)	3–3 (a.e.t.) (7–6 p)	(Pennsylvania) Philadelphia Union (MLS)	Saint Paul, Minnesota
7:30 PM CDT	Hlongwane 68', 103'; Rosales 73'	Report	Donavan 78'; Wagner 90+4', 120'	Stadium: Allianz Field; Attendance: 4,216; Referee: Fotis Bazakos
	Penalties
	Fragapane (penalty scored); Trapp (penalty scored); Arriaga (penalty missed); Rosales (penalty scored); Dunbar (penalty scored); Kallman (penalty scored); Boxall (penalty scored); Tapias (penalty scored)		(penalty scored) Gazdag; (penalty scored) Elliott; (penalty missed) Real; (penalty scored) Torres; (penalty scored) Carranza; (penalty scored) Rafanello; (penalty scored) Lowe; (penalty missed) Wagner

May 9	Monterey Bay FC (USLC) (California)	2–2 (a.e.t.) (4–5 p)	(California) Los Angeles FC (MLS)	Seaside, California
7:30 PM PDT	Dawkins 90'; Maldonado 94'	Report	Torres 25'; Maia 105'	Stadium: Cardinale Stadium; Attendance: 5,808; Referee: Cristian Campo
	Penalties
	Volesky (penalty scored); Dawkins (penalty scored); Greene (penalty scored); Okoli (penalty missed); Boone (penalty scored); Fehr (penalty missed)		(penalty scored) Maia; (penalty scored) Ordaz; (penalty missed) Crisostomo; (penalty scored) Moyado; (penalty scored) Jakupović; (penalty scored) Rosales

May 9	Sacramento Republic FC (USLC) (California)	2–4	Colorado Rapids (MLS)	Sacramento, California
7:30 PM PDT	Herrera 30', 52'	Report	Lewis 4'; Edwards 15'; Nicholson 55'; Barrios 81'	Stadium: Heart Health Park; Attendance: 8,897; Referee: Ricardo Fierro

May 10	FC Cincinnati (MLS) (Ohio)	1–0	(New York (state)) New York City FC (MLS)	Cincinnati, Ohio
7:00 PM EDT	Vázquez 56'	Report		Stadium: TQL Stadium; Attendance: 7,196; Referee: Timothy Ford

May 10	Loudoun United FC (USLC) (Virginia)	1–5	(Ohio) Columbus Crew (MLS)	Leesburg, Virginia
7:00 PM EDT	ElMedkhar 86' (pen.)	Report	Yeboah 6'; Zawadzki 18'; Parente 24', 27'; Ramírez 36'	Stadium: Segra Field; Attendance: 3,201; Referee: Luis Arroyo

May 10	Birmingham Legion FC (USLC) (Alabama)	3–0	(Tennessee) Memphis 901 FC (USLC)	Birmingham, Alabama
7:00 PM CDT	Agudelo 20'; Martínez 39'; Pasher 64'	Report		Stadium: Protective Stadium; Attendance: 3,150; Referee: Lorenzo Hernandez

May 10	Houston Dynamo FC (MLS) (Texas)	1–0	(Kansas) Sporting Kansas City (MLS)	Houston, Texas
7:30 PM CDT	Úlfarsson 12'	Report		Stadium: Shell Energy Stadium; Attendance: 5,094; Referee: Sergii Demianchuk

May 10	Nashville SC (MLS) (Tennessee)	2–0	(Texas) FC Dallas (MLS)	Nashville, Tennessee
7:30 PM CDT	Picault 63'; Muyl 76'	Report		Stadium: Geodis Park; Attendance: 5,196; Referee: Lukasz Szpala

May 10	Austin FC (MLS) (Texas)	2–0	(New Mexico) New Mexico United (USLC)	Austin, Texas
8:00 PM CDT	Redes 24'; Urruti 36'	Report		Stadium: Q2 Stadium; Attendance: 20,019; Referee: Elton García

May 10	LA Galaxy (MLS) (California)	3–1	(Washington (state)) Seattle Sounders FC (MLS)	Carson, California
7:30 PM PDT	Aude 3'; Rodríguez 66', 84'	Report	Rothrock 68'	Stadium: Dignity Health Sports Park; Attendance: 8,412; Referee: Matt Geringer

May 10	Portland Timbers (MLS) (Oregon)	3–4	(Utah) Real Salt Lake (MLS)	Portland, Oregon
7:30 PM PDT	Blanco 4'; Rasmussen 50'; Niezgoda 52'	Report	Musovski 30'; Gómez 41'; Chang 55', 59'	Stadium: Providence Park; Attendance: 8,071; Referee: Victor Rivas

== Round of 16 and beyond ==
=== Teams ===
Teams for Round of 16/QF draw
Previous round winners

Austin FC (MLS)
Charlotte FC (MLS)
Chicago Fire FC (MLS)
FC Cincinnati (MLS)
Colorado Rapids (MLS)
Columbus Crew (MLS)
Houston Dynamo FC (MLS)
Inter Miami CF (MLS)
Los Angeles FC (MLS)
LA Galaxy (MLS)
Minnesota United FC (MLS)
Nashville SC (MLS)
New York Red Bulls (MLS)
Real Salt Lake (MLS)
Birmingham Legion FC (USLC)
Pittsburgh Riverhounds SC (USLC)

=== Groups ===
Draw groups
Central	Northeast	Southeast	West
Austin FC; Chicago Fire FC; Houston Dynamo FC; Minnesota United FC	Columbus Crew; FC Cincinnati; New York Red Bulls; Pittsburgh Riverhounds SC	Birmingham Legion FC; Charlotte FC; Inter Miami CF; Nashville SC	Colorado Rapids; LA Galaxy; Los Angeles FC; Real Salt Lake

=== Bracket ===
Round of 16; May 23–24
MLS	(New Jersey) New York Red Bulls	1 (3)
**MLS**	**(Ohio) FC Cincinnati (p)**	**1 (5)**
Northeast
**USLC**	**(Pennsylvania) Pittsburgh Riverhounds SC**	**1**
MLS	(Ohio) Columbus Crew	0
**USLC**	**(Alabama) Birmingham Legion FC**	**1**
MLS	(North Carolina) Charlotte FC	0
Southeast
**MLS**	**(Florida) Inter Miami CF**	**2**
MLS	(Tennessee) Nashville SC	1
MLS	(Texas) Austin FC	0
**MLS**	**(Illinois) Chicago Fire FC**	**2**
Central
**MLS**	**(Texas) Houston Dynamo FC**	**4**
MLS	Minnesota United FC	0
MLS	Colorado Rapids	0
**MLS**	**(Utah) Real Salt Lake**	**1**
West
MLS	(California) Los Angeles FC	0
**MLS**	**(California) LA Galaxy**	**2**

Quarterfinals; June 6–7
**MLS**	**(Ohio) FC Cincinnati**	**3**
USLC	(Pennsylvania) Pittsburgh Riverhounds SC	1
USLC	(Alabama) Birmingham Legion FC	0
**MLS**	**(Florida) Inter Miami CF**	**1**
MLS	(Illinois) Chicago Fire FC	1
**MLS**	**(Texas) Houston Dynamo FC**	**4**
**MLS**	**(Utah) Real Salt Lake**	**3**
MLS	(California) LA Galaxy	2

Semifinals; August 23
MLS	(Ohio) FC Cincinnati	3 (4)
**MLS**	**(Florida) Inter Miami CF (p)**	**3 (5)**
**MLS**	**(Texas) Houston Dynamo FC**	**3 (a.e.t.)**
MLS	(Utah) Real Salt Lake	1

Final; September 27
MLS	(Florida) Inter Miami CF	1
**MLS**	**(Texas) Houston Dynamo FC**	**2**

Host team listed first
Bold = winner
(a.e.t.) = after extra time, (p) = penalty shootout score

=== Round of 16 ===
All times local to game site.

May 23	**Inter Miami CF (MLS) (Florida)**	**2–1**	**(Tennessee)** Nashville SC (MLS)	Fort Lauderdale, Florida
7:30 PM EDT	Negri 57'; Stefanelli 73'	Report	Muyl 66'	Stadium: DRV PNK Stadium; Attendance: 2,244; Referee: Lukasz Szpala

May 23	New York Red Bulls (MLS) **(New Jersey)**	**1–1** (a.e.t.) (**3–5** p)	**(Ohio) FC Cincinnati (MLS)**	Harrison, New Jersey
7:30 PM EDT	Vanzeir 90+2'	Report	Kubo 42'	Stadium: Red Bull Arena; Attendance: 4,131; Referee: Fotis Bazakos
	**Penalties**
	Vanzeir (penalty missed); Manoel (penalty scored); Carmona (penalty scored); Cásseres (penalty scored)		(penalty scored) Acosta; (penalty scored) Moreno; (penalty scored) Badji; (penalty scored) Mosquera; (penalty scored) Barreal

May 23	**Houston Dynamo FC (MLS) (Texas)**	**4–0**	**(Minnesota)** Minnesota United FC (MLS)	Houston, Texas
7:30 PM CDT	Baird 33' (pen.), 68', 89'; Ibrahim 79'	Report	Arriaga (yellow card) 30' (yellow-red card) 38'	Stadium: Shell Energy Stadium; Attendance: 2,947; Referee: Ramy Touchan

May 23	Los Angeles FC (MLS) **(California)**	**0–2**	**(California) LA Galaxy (MLS)**	Los Angeles, California
7:30 PM PDT		Report	Boyd 49'; Puig 52'	Stadium: BMO Stadium; Attendance: 16,362; Referee: Allen Chapman

May 24	**Pittsburgh Riverhounds SC (USLC) (Pennsylvania)**	**1–0**	**(Ohio)** Columbus Crew (MLS)	Pittsburgh, Pennsylvania
7:00 PM EDT	Dikwa 22'; Kizza (red card) 90+5'	Report		Stadium: Highmark Stadium; Attendance: 6,107; Referee: Jeremy Scheer

May 24	**Birmingham Legion FC (USLC) (Alabama)**	**1–0**	**(North Carolina)** Charlotte FC (MLS)	Birmingham, Alabama
7:00 PM CDT	Kasim 60'	Report	Malanda (yellow card) 28' (yellow-red card) 51'	Stadium: Protective Stadium; Attendance: 12,722; Referee: Guido Gonzales Jr.

May 24	Austin FC (MLS) **(Texas)**	**0–2**	**(Illinois) Chicago Fire FC (MLS)**	Austin, Texas
8:00 PM CDT		Report	Czichos 27'; Przybyłko 77'	Stadium: Q2 Stadium; Attendance: 19,402; Referee: Alex Chilowicz

May 24	Colorado Rapids (MLS) **(Colorado)**	**0–1**	**(Utah) Real Salt Lake (MLS)**	Commerce City, Colorado
8:00 PM MDT		Report	Savarino 30'	Stadium: Dick's Sporting Goods Park; Attendance: 2,280; Referee: Andrew Musashe

=== Quarterfinals ===
All times local to game site.

June 6	**FC Cincinnati (MLS) (Ohio)**	**3–1**	**(Pennsylvania)** Pittsburgh Riverhounds SC (USLC)	Cincinnati, Ohio
7:00 PM EDT	Vázquez 56'; Barreal 71'; Arias 90+3'	Report	Showunmi 90+4'	Stadium: TQL Stadium; Attendance: 16,613; Referee: Elvis Osmanovic

June 6	Chicago Fire FC (MLS) **(Illinois)**	**1–4**	**(Texas) Houston Dynamo FC (MLS)**	Bridgeview, Illinois
7:30 PM CDT	Souquet 40'	Report	Bassi 12' (pen.); Aliyu 31', 59'; Quiñónes 74'	Stadium: SeatGeek Stadium; Attendance: 7,512; Referee: Marcos De Oliveira

June 7	Birmingham Legion FC (USLC) **(Alabama)**	**0–1**	**(Florida) Inter Miami CF (MLS)**	Birmingham, Alabama
7:00 PM CDT		Report	Stefanelli 56'	Stadium: Protective Stadium; Attendance: 18,418; Referee: Sergii Demianchuk

June 7	**Real Salt Lake (MLS) (Utah)**	**3–2**	**(California)** LA Galaxy (MLS)	Sandy, Utah
7:30 PM MDT	Kreilach 19', 45+6'; Savarino 51'	Report	Brugman 82' (pen.); Douglas Costa 84'	Stadium: America First Field; Attendance: 20,712; Referee: Ramy Touchan

=== Semifinals ===
All times local to game site.

August 23	FC Cincinnati (MLS) **(Ohio)**	**3–3** (a.e.t.) (**4–5** p)	**(Florida) Inter Miami CF (MLS)**	Cincinnati, Ohio
7:00 PM EDT	Acosta 18'; Vázquez 53'; Kubo 114'	Report	Campana 68', 90+7'; Martínez 93'	Stadium: TQL Stadium; Attendance: 25,513; Referee: Joe Dickerson
	**Penalties**
	Kubo (penalty scored); Arias (penalty scored); Santos (penalty scored); Miazga (penalty scored); Hagglund (penalty missed)		(penalty scored) Messi; (penalty scored) Farías; (penalty scored) Ruiz; (penalty scored) Martínez; (penalty scored) Cremaschi

August 23	**Houston Dynamo FC (MLS) (Texas)**	**3–1** (a.e.t.)	**(Utah)** Real Salt Lake (MLS)	Houston, Texas
8:30 PM CDT	Herrera 45+5'; Carrasquilla 105'; Caicedo 120+5'	Report	Julio 64'	Stadium: Shell Energy Stadium; Attendance: 11,137; Referee: Lukasz Szpala

=== Final ===
September 27, 2023
8:30 p.m. EDT

Inter Miami CF	1–2	Houston Dynamo FC
Martínez 90+2'	MLS; USSF	Dorsey 24'; Bassi 33' (pen.)

DRV PNK Stadium, Fort Lauderdale, Florida
Attendance: 20,288
Referee: Jon Freemon

== Broadcasting ==
Warner Bros. Discovery Sports holds the rights to broadcast the Open Cup from 2023 to 2030, as part of a larger media rights agreement with U.S. Soccer. Select matches from the first three rounds were broadcast for free on the Bleacher Report app or via the B/R Football YouTube channel. Select matches are sublicensed to stream live on an involved team's YouTube channel, Eleven Sports or the CBS Sports Golazo Network. The Round of 32 would see a majority of games featured on the Bleacher Report app and B/R Football YouTube channel, with four games on CBS Sports Golazo Network and four on the U.S. Soccer YouTube channel. The Round of 16 and Quarterfinals had games split between Bleacher Report and CBS Sports Golazo Network. The semifinals are planned to be streamed on both CBS Sports Golazo Network and Paramount+ in the United States as well as 20 international broadcasters due to Lionel Messi's signing with semifinalist Inter Miami CF, with the final airing on CBS Sports Network as well as streaming on Paramount+. Spanish-language rights in the United States for the semifinals and final would belong to Telemundo and Universo, with both being streamed on Peacock. In Argentina, it will be broadcast by TyC Sports only for Lionel Messi's Inter Miami matches.

== Top goal scorers ==
Team eliminated for this round.

Rank	Player	Team	Goals	By round							
Rank	Player	Team	Goals	1R	2R	3R	R32	R16	QF	SF	F
1	(England) Josh Dolling	New Mexico United	4		3	1					
1	(Croatia) Damir Kreilach	Real Salt Lake	4			2			2		
3	(United States) Juan Agudelo	Birmingham Legion FC	3		2		1				
3	(Nigeria) Ibrahim Aliyu	Houston Dynamo FC	3					1	2		
3	(Ghana) Elvis Amoh	Hartford Athletic	3		3						
3	(United States) Corey Baird	Houston Dynamo FC	3					3			
3	(United States) Jonathan Lewis	Colorado Rapids	3			2	1				
3	(United States) Milan Iloski	Orange County SC	3		2	1					
3	(United States) Brandon Vázquez	FC Cincinnati	3				1		1	1	
10	(United States) Richard Aman	Crossfire Redmond	2		2						
10	(United States) Kendall Burks	Chicago Fire FC	2			2					
10	(Ecuador) Leonardo Campana	Inter Miami CF	2							2	
10	(Cuba) Maikel Chang	Real Salt Lake	2				2				
10	(United States) Russell Cicerone	Sacramento Republic FC	2		2						
10	(United States) Joe Corona	San Diego Loyal SC	2			2					
10	(United States) Joseph Devivo	Lansdowne Yonkers FC	2	2							
10	(United States) Stephen Elias	Flower City Union	2		2						
10	(United States) Kalil ElMedkhar	Loudoun United FC	2			1	1				
10	(Honduras) Darwin Espinal	Maryland Bobcats FC	2		2						
10	(United States) Azriel Gonzalez	Las Vegas Lights FC	2		2						
10	(Panama) Carlos Harvey	Phoenix Rising FC	2		1	1					
10	(Colombia) Juan Sebastián Herrera	Sacramento Republic FC	2				2				
10	(South Africa) Bongokuhle Hlongwane	Minnesota United FC	2				2				
10	(United States) Camden Holbrook	Appalachian FC	2	2							
10	(United States) Aziel Jackson	St. Louis City SC	2			2					
10	(Poland) Kamil Jóźwiak	Charlotte FC	2			1	1				
10	(United States) Bibi Karamoko	Manhattan SC	2	1	1						
10	(Ghana) Prosper Kasim	Birmingham Legion FC	2			1		1			
10	(Japan) Yuya Kubo	FC Cincinnati	2					1		1	
10	(Bermuda) Zeiko Lewis	Sacramento Republic FC	2		2						
10	(United States) Nick Markanich	Charleston Battery	2		1	1					
10	(South Africa) Yazeed Matthews	Detroit City FC	2		1	1					
10	(Colombia) Fredy Montero	Seattle Sounders FC	2			2					
10	(Cape Verde) Hevany Mota	Capo FC	2	2							
10	(United States) Alex Muyl	Nashville SC	2				1	1			
10	(Norway) Markus Naglestad	Chattanooga FC	2		1	1					
10	(United States) Danny Musovski	Real Salt Lake	2			1	1				
10	(Poland) Jarosław Niezgoda	Portland Timbers	2			1	1				
10	(United States) Isaiah Parente	Columbus Crew	2				2				
10	(United States) Wolfgang Prentice	Oakland Roots SC	2		2						
10	(Poland) Kacper Przybyłko	Chicago Fire FC	2			1		1			
10	(Italy) Claudio Repetto	Miami FC	2		2						
10	(Argentina) Gabriel Rodríguez	Des Moines Menace	2	2							
10	(United States) Memo Rodríguez	LA Galaxy	2				2				
10	(United States) Paul Rothrock	Seattle Sounders FC	2			1	1				
10	(United States) Zach Ryan	Loudoun United FC	2		1	1					
10	(Venezuela) Jefferson Savarino	Real Salt Lake	2					1	1		
10	(United States) Anthony Ray Smith Jr	Chicago House AC	2		2						
10	(Argentina) Nicolás Stefanelli	Inter Miami CF	2					1	1		
10	(Argentina) Emiliano Terzaghi	Richmond Kickers	2		2						
10	(Germany) Kai Wagner	Philadelphia Union	2				2				
10	(United States) Thomas Williamson	Loudoun United FC	2			2					
10	(United States) Christian Volesky	Monterey Bay FC	2		1	1					
