= 2024 NISA Nation season =

US soccer league season

NISA Nation
- Season: 2024
- Dates: March 16 - Dececmber 7
- Champion: New York Greek Americans (EPSL)
- Matches: 294
- Goals: 718 (2.44 per match)
- Biggest home win: LVL 11–0 IRV (5/18)
- Biggest away win: OLY 0–15 WPF (11/3)
- Highest scoring: OLY 0–15 WPF (11/3)
- All statistics correct as of 20:32, November 5, 2024 (UTC).

The 2024 NISA Nation season was the fourth season of NISA Nation, a semi-professional 4th tier league in the United States soccer league system, and a feeder league to 3rd tier NISA.

The 2024 season was expected to be played across 4 regions: Pacific, Southwest, Texas and Upstate New York. The region champions, as well as the champions of NISA Nation's affiliated leagues, ended the season by playing in a National Championship that determined the teams invited by NISA to promote to the professional level. The tournament took place in November and December, in Southern California.

All 2023 regional champions in active NISA Nation regions, Battleborn FC (Pacific), Golden State Force (Southwest) and FC Brownsville (Texas), are back in 2024 to defend their titles. 2023 National Championship finalists Las Vegas Legends accepted an invitation to promote to NISA, but will only do so in the 2025 season.

== Spring Teams ==
=== Pacific Region ===
Team	City	Stadium
Afghan Premier FC	Fremont, California	Ohlone College Soccer Field
ASC Silicon Valley	Redwood City, California	Terremere Field
Battleborn FC	Minden, Nevada	Golden Eagle Sports Complex
Bay Area United FC	Richmond, California	Estuary Park Soccer Field
Club Tepa	San Francisco, California	South San Francisco High School
Galaxy Silicon Valley	Union City, California	James Logan High School
Laguna FC	San Francisco, California	Kezar Stadium
Modesto City FC	Modesto, California	Central Catholic High School

=== Southwest Region ===
Team	City	Stadium
Capo FC	San Juan Capistrano, California	JSerra Catholic High School
Craq Intercontinental	Salton City, California	West Shores High School
Desert FC	La Quinta, California	Hovley Soccer Park
FC Golden State Force	Pomona, California	Rio Hondo College
Irvine Zeta FC	Irvine, California	
Las Vegas Legends	Las Vegas, Nevada	Christo Rey St. Viator High School
Olympiacos CA	Huntington Beach, California	Al Barbour Field
SC Union Maricopa (Note: Returned to NISA Nation for the Fall 2024 season)	Phoenix, Arizona	Andess High School
Temecula FC	Temecula, California	Chaparral High School

=== Texas Region ===
Team	City	Stadium
FC Brownsville	Brownsville, Texas	Brownsville Sports Park

=== Upstate New York Region ===
Team	City	Stadium
Binghamton FC	Binghamton, New York	
FC Dutchmen Independence	Albany, New York	
Gaffer City FC	Corning, New York	
Roc City Boom	Rochester, New York	
Sahara Gunners FC	Buffalo, New York	
United Elite Krajisnick FC	Utica, New York	

== Spring Season ==
=== Competition format ===
The inaugural regions announced were the Pacific and Southwest.

- Pacific Region: Clubs play a total of 10 matches. Single table; regular season winner is crowned regional champion.
- Southwest Region: Split into 2 conferences of 4 teams. Conference winners play in the Final, to determine regional champion.

=== Regular season ===
==== Pacific Region ====
===== Standings =====
Pos	Team	Pld	W	D	L	GF	GA	GD	Pts	Qualification
1	Bay Area United (Q)	10	6	2	2	21	12	+9	20	Qualification for Pacific Final
2	Silicon Valley Rush (C)	10	5	4	1	26	11	+15	19	Qualification for Pacific Final
3	Afghan Premier	10	5	4	1	16	5	+11	19	
4	Battleborn FC	9	5	2	2	15	9	+6	17	
5	ASC Silicon Valley	10	4	1	5	19	16	+3	13	
6	Laguna FC	9	3	2	4	14	20	−6	11	
7	Club Tepa	10	2	3	5	16	24	−8	9	
8	Modesto City	10	0	0	10	0	30	−30	0	

Source: https://nisanation.com/table
(C) Champions; (Q) Qualified for the phase indicated

===== Results =====
Home \ Away	AFG	ASC	BAT	BAY	TEP	GAL	LAG	MOD
Afghan Premier	—	1–1	1–0	1–1		2–2		3–0*
ASC Silicon Valley		—		1–2	4–2	2–1	1–2	3–0*
Battleborn FC	0–3^	3–2	—	3–2		0–0		3–0*
Bay Area United	0–2		3–1	—	0–3	1–3	3–1	3–0*
Club Tepa	0–3	2–0	1–1		—	1–6	3–3	
Silicon Valley Rush		2–1		2–2	2–2	—	1–2	3–0*
Laguna FC	0–0	1–4	3–0#		3–1	1–5	—	
Modesto City	0–3*		0–3*	0–3*	0–3*		0–3*	—

Source: https://nisanation.com/schedule
Legend: Blue = home team win; Yellow = draw; Red = away team win.

Notes

* = Modesto City dropped from league, all games became 0–3 for forfeit
^ = Afghan Premier FC awarded forfeit win over Battleborn FC
# = Laguna FC awarded forfeit win over Battleborn FC

=== Playoff ===
Region Finals
CA	Bay Area United	1
CA	Silicon Valley Rush	3

==== Southwest Region ====
===== Standings =====
====== East Conference ======
Pos	Team	Pld	W	D	L	GF	GA	GD	Pts	Qualification
1	Las Vegas Legends (C)	9	9	0	0	31	2	+29	27	Qualification for Southwest Final
2	FC Golden State Force (Q)	9	7	0	2	34	6	+28	21	Qualification for Southwest Final
3	Desert FC	3	0	1	2	0	6	−6	1	
4	Craq Intercontinental	9	0	1	8	0	24	−24	1	

Source: https://nisanation.com/table
(C) Champions; (Q) Qualified for the phase indicated

====== West Conference ======
Pos	Team	Pld	W	D	L	GF	GA	GD	Pts
1	Capo FC	9	7	0	2	31	8	+23	21
2	Temecula FC	9	5	0	4	32	11	+21	15
3	Olympiacos CA	9	3	0	6	15	41	−26	9
4	Irvine Zeta FC	9	1	0	8	8	53	−45	3

Source: https://nisanation.com/table

===== Results =====
Home \ Away	CRQ	DES	GOL	LVL	CAP	IRV	OLY	TEM
Craq Intercontinental	—	0–0^	0–3*	0–3*	0–3*			0–3*
Desert FC	0–0^	—	0–3*	0–3*	#			#
FC Golden State Force	3–0*	#	—	0–1		10–1	9–1	4–1
Las Vegas Legends	3–0*	#	2–0	—		11–0	4–0	
Capo FC			0–2	1–2	—	6–1	7–0	2–1
Irvine Zeta FC	0–7				0–6	—	1–5	0–3*
Olympiacos CA	1–2	#			2–5	3–1	—	1–6
Temecula FC				1–2	0–1	9–1	8–0	—

Source: https://nisanation.com/schedule
Legend: Blue = home team win; Yellow = draw; Red = away team win.

Notes

* = Team awarded 3–0 win for forfeit
^ = Teams awarded 0–0 draw because both forfeit
# = Game never contested

=== Playoff ===
Region Finals
Las Vegas Legends	1
FC Golden State Force	0

==== Western NY Region ====
===== Standings =====
Pos	Team	Pld	W	D	L	GF	GA	GD	Pts
1	Roc City Boom (C)	10	8	1	1	31	12	+19	25
2	Binghamton FC	10	7	2	1	29	16	+13	23
3	United Elite Krajisnik FC	10	6	1	3	31	17	+14	19
4	Gaffer City FC	10	3	1	6	21	30	−9	10
5	FC Dutchman Independence	10	2	1	7	17	26	−9	7
6	Sahara Gunners FC	10	1	0	9	16	44	−28	3

Source: https://nisanation.com/table
(C) Champions

===== Results =====
Home \ Away	BFC	FDI	GCF	RCB	SGF	UEK
Binghamton FC	—	3–1	3–3	4–1	6–3	1–1
FC Dutchman Independence	1–4	—	3–2	1–1	2–0	1–2
Gaffer City FC	0–1	2–1	—	1–3	5–1	1–3
Roc City Boom	3–1	4–1	6–0	—	4–0	5–3
Sahara Gunners FC	2–3	4–3	2–6	1–3	—	0–6
United Elite Krajisnik FC	1–3	4–3	5–2	0–1	6–0	—

Source: https://nisanation.com/schedule
Legend: Blue = home team win; Yellow = draw; Red = away team win.

== Fall Teams ==
=== Coast Region ===
Team	City	Stadium
Capo FC	San Juan Capistrano, California	JSerra Catholic High School
FC Golden State Force	Pomona, California	Rio Hondo College
Irvine Zeta FC	Irvine, California	
Las Vegas Legends	Las Vegas, Nevada	Christo Rey St. Viator High School
Olympiacos CA	Huntington Beach, California	Al Barbour Field
Soccer Academy Nevada	Las Vegas, Nevada	
STG Premier Pro	St. George, Utah	Pine View High School
Temecula FC	Temecula, California	Chaparral High School
Worldwide Problems FC	Anaheim, California	

=== Pacific Region ===
Team	City	Stadium
Afghan Premier FC	Fremont, California	Ohlone College Soccer Field
Club Tepa	San Francisco, California	South San Francisco High School
Elk Grove Blues	Sacramento, California	
Silicon Valley Rush	Union City, California	James Logan High School
Modesto Ciy FC	Modesto, California	Central Catholic High School

== Fall Season ==
=== Regular season ===
==== Standings ====
Pos	Team	Pld	W	D	L	GF	GA	GD	Pts
1	Worldwide Problems FC (C)	9	7	0	2	45	15	+30	21
2	Las Vegas Legends	8	6	2	0	33	17	+16	20
3	FC Golden State Force	9	5	1	3	32	13	+19	16
4	Soccer Academy Nevada	8	5	0	3	19	11	+8	15
5	Temecula FC	9	4	0	5	24	14	+10	12
6	STG Premier Pro	8	1	1	6	19	23	−4	4
7	Olympiacos CA	9	0	0	9	5	84	−79	0

Source: https://nisanation.com/table
(C) Champions

===== Results =====
Home \ Away	GOL	LVL	OLY	SAN	SPP	TEM	WPF
FC Golden State Force	—	2–2	8–0	0–1		2–1	2–3
Las Vegas Legends		—	8–1	2–0	3–3	3–1	
Olympiacos CA	0–11		—	0–6	4–10	0–11	0–15
Soccer Academy Nevada		4–5		—	4–1	2–1	0–1
STG Premier Pro	1–3	3–4		1–2	—		0–2
Temecula FC	0–1		5–0		1–0	—	3–2
Worldwide Problems FC	5–3	3–6	10–0			4–1	—

Source: https://nisanation.com/schedule
Legend: Blue = home team win; Yellow = draw; Red = away team win.

==== Pacific Region ====
===== Standings =====
Pos	Team	Pld	W	D	L	GF	GA	GD	Pts
1	Silicon Valley Rush (C)	7	5	1	1	26	8	+18	16
2	Club Tepa	8	5	1	2	27	19	+8	16
3	Afghan Premier	8	4	1	3	20	18	+2	13
4	Elk Grove Blues	8	3	0	5	16	23	−7	9
5	Modesto City	7	0	1	6	6	27	−21	1

Source: https://nisanation.com/table
(C) Champions

===== Results =====
Home \ Away	AFG	ELK	GAL	MOD	TEP
Afghan Premier	—	4–0	2–1	2–2	4–1
Elk Grove Blues	4–2	—	0–1	4–1	2–3
Silicon Valley Rush	4–2	7–0	—	7–0	2–2
Modesto City	1–2	0–3	Can.	—	1–4
Club Tepa	5–2	5–3	2–4	5–1	—

Source: https://nisanation.com/schedule
Legend: Blue = home team win; Yellow = draw; Red = away team win.

== National Championship ==
West Region Semifinals; November 23
MPL	Peak XI FC	0
Coast	Worldwide Problems FC	3
SW	Las Vegas Legends	8
SWPL	Chula Vista FC	0

West Region Championship; November 24
Coast	Worldwide Problems FC	2
SW	Las Vegas Legends	1

National Championship; December 7
Coast	Worldwide Problems FC	2
EPSL	New York Greek Americans	6
Fourth place
MPL	Peak XI FC	5
SWPL	Chula Vista FC	1

== Independent Cup ==
=== West Coast Region ===
Quarterfinals
NISA	Los Angeles Force	7
NISA Nation	Laguna FC	0
NISA	Arizona Monsoon	0
UPSL	SC Union Maricopa	5

Semifinals
NISA	Los Angeles Force	w/o
UPSL	Lobos FC
UPSL	SC Union Maricopa	3
UPSL	Indios Denver FC	1

Finals
NISA	Los Angeles Force	5
UPSL	SC Union Maricopa	0

=== Pacific Region ===
Quarterfinals
NISA	Capo FC	1
NISA Nation	ALBION Silicon Valley	2
NISA	Irvine Zeta FC	7
NISA Nation	Bay Area United	1

Semifinals
NISA Nation	ALBION Silicon Valley	2
SWPL	Olympiacos CA	1
NISA	Irvine Zeta FC	3
UPSL	Silicon Valley Rush	0

Finals
NISA Nation	ALBION Silicon Valley	2
NISA	Irvine Zeta FC	10

== Awards ==
=== Player of the Week ===
==== Spring Season ====
Week	Player	Club	Stats	Ref.
1	(Nicaragua) Amfed Luquez	Temecula FC	Hat-trick	
2	(United States) David Villanueva	Las Vegas Legends	Goals in back to back games	
3	(Afghanistan) Safiullah Azizi	Afghan Premier FC	Hat-trick and assist	
4	(Mexico) Jonathan Santiago	FC Golden State Force	Hat-trick and three assists	
5	(United States) Brian Alvarez	Olympiacos CA	Hat-trick	
6	(Mexico) Jose Sanchez	Laguna FC	Two goals	
7	(Saudi Arabia) Abdulrahman Algabri	Bay Area United FC	Two goals	
8	(United States) Jailany Thiaw	Laguna FC	Hat-trick	
9	(United States) Andres Jimenez	Silicon Valley Rush	Hat-trick	
10	(United States) Landon Elfstrom	Silicon Valley Rush	Hat-trick	
11	(United States) Myles Palmer	Roc City Boom	Two goals	
12	(United States) Keefer Calkins	Gaffer City FC	Hat-trick	
13	(United States) Miguel Duenas, Jr.	Las Vegas Legends	Clean sheet	
14	(Croatia) Danijal Brkovic	United Elite Krajisnik FC	Hat-trick	
15	(Croatia) Rudy Sandoval	Laguna FC	Two goals	
16	(United States) Anthony Moran	Silicon Valley Rush	Two goals	
17	(United States) Chuck Domm	Roc City Boom	Two goals	
18	(Croatia) Haris Brkovic	Binghamton FC	Two goals	
19	(Hungary) Tamas Nagy	Roc City Boom	Hat trick	

==== Fall Season ====
Week	Player	Club	Stats	Ref.
1	(United States) Johnathan Negrete	Soccer Academy Nevada	Two goals	
2	(Portugal) Antonio Bernardo Costeira de Almeida	STG Premier Pro	Two goals	
3	(United States) Alejandro Alvarez	Soccer Academy Nevada	Clean sheet	
4	(United States) Kevin Kamara	Elk Grove Blues	Two goals	
5	(United States) Alberto Renteria	Temecula FC	Two goals	
6	(United States) Roberto Soto	Las Vegas Legends	Four goals	
7	(United States) Alejando Perez Rodriguez	Club Tepa	Hat trick	
8	(Morocco) Khalid Arramdani	Silicon Valley Rush	Two goals	
9	(United States) Axel Valle	Silicon Valley Rush	Hat trick	

== See also ==
- NISA Nation
- National Independent Soccer Association
- 2024 National Independent Soccer Association season
