= 2022 National Amateur Cup =

98th edition of cup competition in American soccer

2022 USASA National Amateur Cup
Tournament details
- Country: United States
- Teams: 43 (Note: Beaman United FC is included in this total. However, the infobox does not include any goals scored by or against, nor games involving, the team due to their disqualification from the USASA Region 3 tournament.)

Final positions
- Champions: Bavarian United SC (6th title)
- Runners-up: Northern Virginia FC

Tournament statistics
- Matches played: 42
- Goals scored: 194 (4.62 per match)

The 2022 National Amateur Cup was the 98th edition of the National Amateur Cup, a knockout cup competition open to amateur teams affiliated with the United States Adult Soccer Association (USASA). It was the fourth edition of the tournament to award its champion a spot in the U.S. Open Cup.

Lansdowne Yonkers FC were the defending National Amateur Cup champion, but failed to advance after falling to the NY Greek Americans in the Eastern New York Final. Bavarian United SC won their sixth National Amateur Cup title, defeating Northern Virginia FC 1–0 in the final.

== Format ==
All four regions of the USASA will hold tournaments to crown champions, which would then qualify for the final tournament. Qualification for these tournaments is determined individually by each region. The final four teams then compete in a single location knockout tournament to crown a national champion, with an additional game in place to determine both third and fourth place.

Prior to the regional tournament's beginning, the United Premier Soccer League was approved as a National Affiliate member of the United States Soccer Federation. Due to this, UPSL left its sanctioning under USASA and its teams became ineligible for the association's tournaments including the Amateur Cup.

== Region I ==
Nine state associations in USASA Region I sent representatives to the tournament for the Fritz Marth Amateur Cup. The Eastern Premier Soccer League is the most represented league in the region with three teams participating (Fall River, Greek Americans, and NoVa FC). The final of the regional tournament took place on June 19 at the Ukrainian American Sports Center in North Wales, Pennsylvania.

First round

April 10	Christos FC **(Maryland)**	**2–5**	**(Pennsylvania) West Chester United SC**	Woodbine, Maryland
5:00pm (EDT)	Bender 28'; Harris 52'	Report; Broadcast	Bradley 18'; Gosselin 24'; Burris 35', 70'; Tima 77'	Stadium: Western Regional Park, Field #5

Bracket

Home teams listed on top of bracket

Quarterfinals; April 23–24/30
NY	BSC Raiders	2(9)
VA	**Northern Virginia FC**	**2(10)**
**South**
PA	**West Chester United SC**	**3**
PA	Appalachia Steel FC	0
NJ	**Vistula Garfield SC**	**3**
MA	Fall River FC	1
**North**
CT	**Newtown Pride FC**	3
NY	NY Greek Americans	2

Semifinals; May 15
VA	**Northern Virginia FC**	**1(5)**
PA	West Chester United SC	1(4)
NJ	Vistula Garfield SC	1
CT	**Newtown Pride FC**	**3**

Final; June 19
VA	**Northern Virginia FC**	**2(5)**
CT	Newtown Pride FC	2(4)

Bold = winner
* = after extra time, ( ) = penalty shootout score

== Region II ==
In total, 22 teams across eight states signed up to compete in the tournament for the Bill Davey Amateur Cup. The Midwest Premier League is the most represented league in the region with seven teams participating, followed by the Ohio Valley Premier League with four teams. Illinois is the most represented state in the tournament with six teams taking part. The final of the regional tournament took place on June 25 at the SeatGeek Stadium Turf Fields in Bridgeview, Illinois.

Home teams listed on top of bracket

Round 1 Apr. 9/16/22
IL	**Steel City FC**	**4**
KS	United KC FC	0
IL	**Springfield FC**	**4***
KY	Northern Kentucky Nitro	2
MN	**Vlora FC**	**6**
WI	Red Star SC	0
MN	St. Paul FC
WI	**MKE Superstars F.C.**	**w/o**
MI	Ann Arbor FC	3
OH	**Valhalla FC**	**7**
MI	**FC BiH Grand Rapids**	**4**
OH	Cincy SC	2
IN	**Fort Wayne Sport Club**	**9**
MI	Teranga Lions	2
IL	**RWB Adria**	**3**
IL	Edgewater Castle FC	1

Round 2 Apr. 21–24/Apr. 30–May 1
KS	FC Porto of Kansas	1
IL	**Steel City FC**	**3***
IL	**Springfield FC**
Bye
KS	Focus FC	0
MN	**Vlora FC** (Note: Game called off in the 47th minute due to severe weather. Vlora FC were declared the winners as they were ahead at the time of the stoppage.)	**4**
WI	**Bavarian United SC**	**5**
WI	MKE Superstars F.C.	1
IL	Berber City FC	2
OH	**Valhalla FC**	**6**
IL	**Schwaben AC**	**2**
MI	FC BiH Grand Rapids	1
WI	**United Serbians SC**	**4***
IN	Fort Wayne Sport Club	3
IL	**RWB Adria**
Bye

Round 3 (Quarterfinals); May 6/15/21
IL	Steel City FC	0
IL	**Springfield FC**	**1**
MN	Vlora FC	1
WI	**Bavarian United SC**	**3**
OH	Valhalla FC	1
IL	**Schwaben AC**	**2**
WI	United Serbians SC	3
IL	**RWB Adria**	**4**

Round 4 (Semifinals); June 4/11
IL	Springfield FC	1
WI	**Bavarian United SC**	**4**
IL	Schwaben AC	0
IL	**RWB Adria**	**4**

Final; June 25
WI	**Bavarian United SC**	**3**
IL	RWB Adria	2

Bold = winner
* = after extra time, ( ) = penalty shootout score

== Region III ==
Region III held its tournament on June 10–12 at Carpenter Park in Plano, Texas. Only four state associations were represented at the competition with four teams coming from the state of Texas (two from Texas South and two from Texas North).

Unlike the other regions, Region III separated its entrants into two groups with each playing three games over two days. Teams played one game against each member of their group and one additional game against a team from the other group. The two highest finishing team from each group moved on to Sunday morning's semifinal round. The Region III Amateur Cup Final took place immediately after on Sunday afternoon.

Following the completion of the regional, champion Beaman United FC was disqualified for using professional players on their roster. Subsequently, their spot in the National Amateur Cup finals went to runner-up ASC New Stars.

Group A

Pos	Team	Pld	W	D	L	GF	GA	GD	Pts	Final result
1	(Texas) ASC New Stars	3	2	1	0	10	2	+8	7	Advance to semifinals
2	(Tennessee) Beaman United FC	3	2	1	0	9	2	+7	7	Advance to semifinals
3	(Texas) Santos FC	3	0	1	2	3	12	−9	1	

Source: Match reports
Rules for classification: 1) points; 2) head to head; 3) goal differential.

Group B

Pos	Team	Pld	W	D	L	GF	GA	GD	Pts	Final result
1	(North Carolina) Tobacco Road FC	3	2	0	1	13	5	+8	6	Advance to semifinals
2	(Texas) Xolos PV	3	1	1	1	8	7	+1	4	Advance to semifinals
3	(Texas) Ice FC/Black Ice	3	0	0	3	0	15	−15	0	

Source: Match reports
Rules for classification: 1) points; 2) head to head; 3) goal differential.

Home \ Away	ASC	BEA	SAN	TOB	XPV	ICE
ASC New Stars	—	1–1	5–1			
Beaman United FC		—		3–1		
Santos FC		0–5	—		2–2	
Tobacco Road FC				—		7–0
Xolos PV				2–5	—	
Ice FC/Black Ice	0–4				0–4	—

Source: Match reports
Legend: Blue = home team win; Yellow = draw; Red = away team win.

Knockout stage

Semifinals; June 12
A1	ASC New Stars	2
B2	Xolos PV	0
A2	Beaman United FC	3
B1	Tobacco Road FC	2

Final; June 12
A1	ASC New Stars	0
A2	Beaman United FC	3

== Region IV ==
Only two states elected to send representatives to the Region IV tournament; Colorado and California. A majority of the teams (5) come from Colorado with three being members of the Colorado Super League and two from the Mountain Premier League. Those teams will compete in a single elimination tournament with the last remaining hosting the Cal South State Cup Champion for the Region IV Amateur Cup.

Home teams listed on top of bracket

Round 1 May 22
CO	**Athletic Club of Sloan's Lake**	**2**
CO	Sporting Colorado ICE	0

Round 2 May 19/29
CO	**Peak XI FC**	**2**
CO	Athletic Club of Sloan's Lake	1
CO	**FC Denver**	**2**
CO	GAM United FC	1

Round 3 June 12
CO	**Peak XI FC**
CO	FC Denver	FF (Note: FC Denver won the original match against Peak XI FC on June 26, 2–0. However, a Denver player that played during the match was later revealed to not be properly registered with USASA. The original result was overturned and Peak advanced to the regional final.)

Bold = winner
* = after extra time, ( ) = penalty shootout score

Region IV Final

June 26	Peak XI FC (Colorado)	**1–3**	**(California) Los Ángeles Strikers**	Lafayette, Colorado
4:00pm (MDT)	Moutaz Badawi	Report	Jordon Lopez 40'; Alex Mendez 45', 80'	Stadium: Centaurus High School

== National Amateur Cup Finals ==
The national finals were held between August 6 and 7 at the Bavarian United Soccer Complex's Heartland Value Fund Stadium in Glendale, Wisconsin. Bavarian United SC won the championship for a sixth time by beating Northern Virginia FC, 1–0. As champion Bavarian received a spot in the 2023 U.S. Open Cup and $7,000.

Semifinals; August 6
TX	ASC New Stars	2(1)
VA	**Northern Virginia FC**	**2(3)**
CA	Los Ángeles Strikers	0
WI	**Bavarian United SC**	**2**

Final; August 7
VA	Northern Virginia FC	0
WI	**Bavarian United SC**	**1**

Bold = winner
* = after extra time, ( ) = penalty shootout score
