= Temecula FC =

- Full name: Temecula Football Club
- Nickname: Quails
- Founded: September 9, 2013; 12 years ago
- Stadium: Chaparral High School
- Owner: Brandon Jantz
- Head Coach: John Oliver
- League: UPSL Premier So Cal South
- 2025: 2nd of 6
- Website: http://temeculafc.com/
Home colors	Away colors

Temecula FC is an American soccer club based in Temecula, California. Founded in 2013, the team currently plays in NISA Nation having previously played in the National Premier Soccer League, the fourth tier of the American soccer pyramid, from 2014 to 2021. The team colors are red and white.

== History ==
Temecula FC was founded by Brandon Jantz and Vince Paccione on September 9, 2013. The team was accepted into the NPSL on September 26, 2013. They played as a member of the Southwest Conference from 2014 through the 2021 season. Following a one-year hiatus, NISA Nation announced Temecula FC as a participant for the 2023 spring season.

Temecula FC was announced as a participant for the 2025 NISA Pro Cup on June 6, 2025. However, prior to the start of the tournament, Temecula FC's X account announced that the club was dropping out of the tournament to instead pursue a bid to join USL League One, which was corroborated by a statement put out by NISA.

=== Seasons ===
As of July 19, 2025

Season	League											Position	Playoffs	USOC
Season	League	Conf	Pld	W	L	D	GF	GA	GD	Pts	PPG	Conf.	Playoffs	USOC
2014	NPSL	Southwest	15	5	4	6	48	40	+8	19	1.27	4th	DNQ	DNQ
2015	NPSL	Southwest	12	1	10	1	14	44	-30	4	0.33	5th	DNQ	DNQ
2016	NPSL	Southwest	12	3	7	2	18	32	-14	11	0.92	6th	DNQ	DNQ
2017	NPSL	Southwest	16	5	8	3	23	35	-12	18	1.13	6th	DNQ	DNQ
2018	NPSL	Southwest	12	1	8	3	12	32	-20	6	0.50	7th	DNQ	DNQ
2019	NPSL	Southwest	18	6	8	4	29	35	-6	17	0.94	6th	DNQ	DNQ
2020	NPSL	Southwest	3	0	2	1	2	12	-10	1	0.33	7th	Season cancelled due to COVID-19	
2021	NPSL	Southwest	10	1	8	1	8	47	-39	4	0.40	5th	DNQ	DNQ
2022	On hiatus for 2022 season													
2023	NISA Nation	Southwest	8	7	0	1	20	3	+17	22	2.75	2nd	DNQ	DNQ
2023	NISA Nation	Southwest	10	7	1	2	47	10	+37	23	2.30	2nd	DNQ	DNQ
2024	NISA Nation	West	9	5	4	0	32	11	+21	15	1.67	2nd	DNQ	DNQ
2024	NISA Nation	Coast	9	4	5	0	24	14	+10	12	1.33	5th	DNQ	DNQ
2025 Spring	NISA Nation	Coast	10	3	4	3	38	24	+14	12	1.20	4th	DNQ	DNQ
Total	–	–	144	48	69	27	315	339	-24	164	1.14	-	-	-

== Stadium ==
Temecula FC currently plays its home games at Chaparral High School's stadium in Temecula. After being announced for the 2025 NISA Pro Cup, owner Brandon Jantz identified the stadium as not being up to USSF standards for professional games and that construction of their own stadium would have to be a long-term goal of the club as they sought to move up to the professional ranks.

== Honors ==
- Riverside County Cup Champions: 2017, 2018, 2021
- Riverside Derby Champions: 2019
