= United States Specialty Sports Association =

American sports organization

United States Specialty Sports Association (USSSA)
- Formation: 1968
- Type: Sport governing body
- Headquarters: Melbourne, Florida, United States
- Location(s): 5800 Stadium Parkway; Viera, Florida 32940
- Coordinates: 28°15′25″N 80°44′22″W
- Members: 3.5 million players
- Executive Director: Meghan Watson
- Website: https://usssa.com

The United States Specialty Sports Association (USSSA) is a volunteer, sports governing body and a nonprofit organization^{[2][3]} based in Melbourne, Florida. Originally USSA stood for United States Slowpitch Softball Association. However, in 1998, USSSA rebranded the name to United States Specialty Sports Association, because it expanded into other sports, including youth girls fastpitch, boys baseball, youth basketball, martial arts and more. USSSA governs 13 sports across the US, Puerto Rico, various US Military bases and Canada, and has a membership of over 3.7 million. In 2017, it generated $25.3 million in revenues.

USSSA was originally founded in 1968 in Petersburg, Virginia, but moved to a new headquarters in Space Coast Stadium in Viera, Florida in the spring of 2017. USSSA took over the Space Coast Stadium complex from the Washington Nationals baseball club. The complex is a new $50 million state-of-the-art multi-purpose complex with 15 multi-purpose, all-turf fields and a new 18,000-square-foot (1,700 m^{2}) building which houses the USSSA National Hall of Fame and Sports Museum.

== History ==
The USSSA organization was formed in the spring of 1968 after the founders' ideas were turned down at a different national softball association's national meeting. The founders of the organization are Robert Mueller, James DiOrio, Ray Ernst, Frank Ciaccia, and Ted Mazza. They used their newly formed organization to implement new developments. These developments include longer fences, 65 foot base paths, a smaller batter's box, widened media coverage, and encouraged greater financial support. Over that last weekend of August 1968, the first USSSA world softball tournament was played in West Allis, Wisconsin. Over the past 40 years USSSA has grown from a couple of thousand slow-pitch softball players to over 3.5 million participants playing 13 primary sports. In fact, USSSA sanctions teams and individuals in 38 sports.

By 1971, USSSA was in debt and directors began resigning. In the fall of that year, a meeting was held in Petersburg, Virginia to decide whether to continue with the organization. The decision was made to move forward, and the executive board elected 40-year-old Al Ramsey of Petersburg as chief executive officer.

Prior to 1975, ASA, then the largest slow-pitch softball association, barred any of its teams from playing in any non-ASA sanctioned event or league. This rule was first challenged in ASA's internal process and then brought to a close after USSSA successfully filed suit in Federal Court in Nashville, TN to stop ASA's discriminatory practices. People playing softball, and now playing many other sports, is what USSSA has always been about and has served as a foundation for its continued growth.

USSSA grew rapidly throughout the 1970s and 1980s, adding new programs such as Church, Corporate, Women's, Mixed and multi levels of Men's play, along with structured Divisions such as Central, Southern, and Midwest. The next year was a great year for the USSSA as they elected their first members to the USSSA Hall-of-Fame. The 11 inch softball was adopted the following year for the Women and Youth Programs. This was a big move for them as nothing quite like this had ever been done before. In 1980, the USSSA took a big step with their organization by birthing a Southern Division to expand the number of teams that could play. That next year, the USSSA was able to purchase a huge 24,000-square foot complex in Petersburg, VA for its National Headquarters and the Museum for its Hall of Fame. A new Midwestern Division was formed, further expanding the association by leaps and bounds. Jerry Ellis was voted into the position of the Association fourth National President. Along with this new blood in the leadership position, registrations by teams and umpires grew tremendously. In 1983, the USSSA adopted a large insurance policy to protect the teams and umpires from accidents on the field at a low cost which continued to further their reputation as a good and sound baseball organization. In 1984, Gary Wallick was elected to be the fifth National President and the Southwestern Division of the USSSA was formed. The ribbon cutting of the USSSA Hall of Fame Museum occurred signaling the grand opening of the large museum to be official to the public eye. The following year team registrations skyrocketed to over 60,000, which almost doubled the size of the entire USSSA from just about three years ago. The official International Division was formed as well this year.

In 1987, the membership total passed 100,000, an all-time high for this organization. Al Ciaccia was elected to be the seventh national president of the USSSA; this year was also its 20th anniversary. The association expanded to eight divisions the next year, and also founded the first Women's World Series and more World Tournaments for Men in the B, C, and D Programs. The USSSA ended up having to push their travel budget to over $250,000 every year.

In 1989 Jim Ports was voted in the president position of the USSSA as its eighth president and American Airlines became the first official airline of the USSSA. The year 1990 was a very momentous occasion for the USSSA as the first slo-pitch softball tour of the Soviet Union occurred, with the team traveling through and playing in Moscow, Leningrad, and Tallinn. In 1991, the USSSA added world tournaments for Black Americans and Women. Jim Swint also became the ninth National President.

In 1992, the USSSA membership reached 120,300 with over 104,000 teams included in it. The assorted men's world tournaments are expanded to include 32 teams instead of the old sixteen in 1993. Tom Raines was then elected to be the tenth national president. The USSSA expanded even more to have divisions in the Army along with a couple other branches. Don DeDonatis earned a two-year term as the national president of the USSSA and during this time, a Bat Performance Standard (BPF) was issued, with the USSSA being the first to do so. In 1997 another major event occurred. The USSSA met at Myrtle Beach, SC, and changed their name from the United States Slo-Pitch Softball Association to the United States Specialty Sports Association. USSSA offers programs and tournaments in Baseball, Basketball, Fastpitch, Flag Football, Golf, Martial Arts, Lacrosse, Soccer, Slow-Pitch, and Volleyball. In 1998, the organization was rocked with sadness as their executive director and CEO, Al Ramsey, died. The Directors went on to immediately elect Assistant Executive Director, Don DeDonatis to take the place of Ramsey. Robert Boudreaux became the 12th National President of the USSSA.

In 1999, Vice Presidents were named for the baseball and basketball sports and for the first time in the history of the organization, Robert Boudreaux was elected to a second term as the National President of the Association. After 30 years of service, National Controller Jerry Ellis retired. Added in to the roster of Championship Tournaments were the Men's Major World Series and the National Golf Tournament.

In 2002 Danny Brown was voted into office as the 13th National President of the USSSA. Also during this year, Don DeDonatis made public the decision to move the USSSA National Headquarters and their Hall of Fame to Osceola County, Florida in 2003. In March 2003, USSSA moved its national headquarters from Virginia to Osceola County, Florida. This move has benefited USSSA and Osceola County in many positive ways. In 2007 USSSA had over 3.5 million participants and is solely responsible for 58,044 room nights in Central Florida, of which 45,307 room nights are in Osceola County. This means millions of dollars in positive economic impact to the region.

In November 2015, Don DeDonatis made public of the associations intention to move USSSA headquarters from Osceola County, FL to Viera, Florida and to also renovate the former home of the Washington Nationals at Space Coast Stadium and create the USSSA Space Coast Complex. In April 2017, USSSA moved its national headquarters to Viera, Florida to the newly renovated Space Coast Stadium and new USSSA Space Coast Complex. The USSSA Pride of the National Pro Fastpitch league started play in May 2017 in the newly renamed USSSA Space Coast Stadium.

Currently, USSSA nationally governs 13 amateur sports. Slow-pitch softball, baseball, fast-pitch softball, and basketball athletes make up approximately 90% of USSSA's membership. The remaining 9 sports account for over 350,000 registrations in USSSA, including Tae Kwan Do and Soccer, two sports that USSSA holds events in Osceola County. Over the past ten years USSSA has not failed to increase its year to year membership. In fact, for all but 3 of those 10 years USSSA's membership has grown by over 10% per year.

== USSSA Space Coast Complex ==
USSSA Space Coast Stadium and Complex
- USSSA Space Coast Stadium′s location in Florida
- Location: 5800 Stadium Parkway; Viera, FL 32940
- Coordinates: 28°15′25″N 80°44′22″W
- Owner: Brevard County, Florida
- Operator: United States Specialty Sports Association (USSSA)
- Capacity: 8,100
- Surface: Multi-purpose field turf
- Field size: Left Field: 340 ft (104 m); Center Field: 404 ft (123 m); Right Field: 340 ft (104 m)

Construction
- Groundbreaking: April 29, 1993
- Opened: March 2, 1994
- Cost: US$6.2 million ($13.5 million in 2025 dollars)
- Architect: DLR Group
- General contractors: Miorelli Construction, Inc.

Tenants
- Brevard County Manatees (FSL) (1994–2016); Florida Marlins (MLB) (spring training) (1994–2002); Montreal Expos (MLB) (spring training) (2003–2004); Washington Nationals (MLB) (spring training) (2005–2016); GCL Nationals (GCL) (2005–2016); United States Specialty Sports Association (USSSA) (fall 2017–present); USSSA Florida Pride (NPF) (2017–present)

Website
- USSSA Space Coast Complex

In 2017 with the assistance of the Brevard County Board of County Commissioners, the United States Specialty Sports Association (USSSA) moved into the empty Space Coast Stadium and the surrounding spring training fields and renamed it the USSSA Space Coast Complex, moving its headquarters from Kissimmee to Space Coast Stadium and announcing plans to renovate the entire complex, using US$22 million of its own and US$10 million contributed by Brevard County. USSSA plans to make the complex into an all-turf venue that will host a variety of sports and sports tournaments — advertised by USSSA as "the youth sports capital of the world" — and serve as a center for amateur baseball and softball. Plans called for renovation work to begin in January 2017 and to be complete in the fall of 2017. The new complex, renamed the USSSA Space Coast Complex, will include a renovated Space Coast Stadium with 8,100 seats, 11 suites, a video board, and a turf field for both baseball and softball; a 225-foot (68.6-meter) "Championship Field" with video board; four 225-foot (68.6-meter) NCAA-softball-regulation turf fields; four 325-foot (99-meter) baseball/softball fields; four 385-foot (117.3-meter) NCAA-regulation turf baseball fields; a 175-foot (53.3-meter) "Championship Field" for players aged 8 and under with a video board; an 18,000-square-foot (1,672-square-meter) indoor facility for training, rehabilitation, and clinics; improved lighting; and two new concessions. The entire complex will include 1.3 million square feet (120,774 square meters) of turf. A groundbreaking ceremony for the renovation project took place at the USSSA Space Coast Stadium on April 27, 2017.

== Baseball ==
In 2004, USSSA held its first World Series, now an annual event. The USSSA Easton Elite World Series has nine divisions: 8U-CP, 8U-KP, 9U, 10U, 11U, 12U, 13U-54/80, 13U-60/90, and 14U-60-90.

== See also ==
- Baseball awards § U.S. youth baseball
- Amateur baseball in the United States § Youth baseball
