= 2021 U.S. Open Cup =

Canceled edition of cup competition in American soccer

2021 Lamar Hunt U.S. Open Cup
Tournament details
- Country: United States
- Teams: 102

Final positions
- Champions: Canceled

The 2021 Lamar Hunt U.S. Open Cup was planned to be the 107th edition of the U.S. Open Cup, a knockout cup competition in American soccer. After the 2020 competition was suspended and ultimately canceled due to the COVID-19 pandemic, the United States Soccer Federation announced that qualification for the 2021 Open Cup would be canceled and all 100 teams that had qualified for that competition would be invited back. Atlanta United FC won the previous tournament after defeating Minnesota United FC in the 2019 final.

On February 8, 2021, the U.S. Soccer Federation stated that only 24 teams would be allowed to participate in a new abbreviated tournament, with the exact qualification details still being determined. On March 29, U.S. Soccer announced the tournament would be downsized to 16 teams who would play four rounds. The opening round was canceled due to the COVID-19 pandemic, while the Open Cup Committee convened to decide whether the competition could proceed. This version of the tournament was to feature eight Major League Soccer teams, four USL Championship teams, one National Independent Soccer Association team, one USL League One team, and two teams from the Open Division determined by a random draw.

The United States Adult Soccer Association recommended that the 2021 edition of the tournament be cancelled due to the additional travel expenses needed to comply with COVID-19 distancing and safety requirements, which would place an undue burden on amateur teams. U.S. Soccer announced in April that the tournament would not be held in the spring due to a combination of financial and logistical issues, and that they were evaluating holding the tournament later in the year. On July 20, U.S. Soccer finally announced that the tournament would be canceled for 2021 and would resume in 2022.

== Qualification ==
The list of eligible teams for the 2021 tournament features 102 teams including 64 professional sides. Two professional teams became eligible since the 2019 tournament (Rio Grande Valley FC Toros and FC Tucson) and two have folded (Reno 1868 FC and 2019 quarterfinalists Saint Louis FC). Entrants include the American clubs from across the soccer leagues system, with timing determined by league division. These include the 24 American clubs of Major League Soccer, as well as the teams in the USL Championship and USL League One that are not owned or operated by an MLS and USL Championship (in case of USL League One). MLS-affiliated clubs from these leagues are eligible. In addition, clubs from the National Independent Soccer Association (NISA), a sanctioned Division III league, are set to take part. This would be the first time two professional leagues from the same tier have both competed in the tournament since 2017.

Both Crossfire Redmond and GPS Portland Phoenix qualified for the 2020 tournament through league results in the National Premier Soccer League and USL League Two respectively. However, neither were listed as eligible in U.S. Soccer's announcement.

The four participating USL Championship teams will be the USL Championship 2020 semifinal playoff teams: El Paso Locomotive FC, Louisville City FC, Phoenix Rising FC, Tampa Bay Rowdies.

Eligible teams
Open Division		Division III	Division II	Division I
ANFEEU/USASA/USCS/USSSA; 13 teams	NPSL/USL League Two; 24 teams	NISA/USL League One; 17 teams	USL Championship; 24 teams	MLS; 24 teams
ANFEEU: Virginia United FC; USASA: Cal FC; Christos FC; Louisiana Krewe FC; Miami United FC U23; Nashville United; Newtown Pride FC (2019 NAC champion); New York Pancyprian-Freedoms; NTX Rayados; Olympic Club; Vereinigung Erzgebirge; USCS: Chula Vista FC; USSSA: FC Boulder Harpos	NPSL: ASC San Diego; Atlantic City FC; Cleveland SC; Denton Diablos FC; FC Arizona; FC Davis; FC Motown; Fort Worth Vaqueros FC; Med City FC; Minneapolis City SC; Naples United FC; Tulsa Athletic; West Chester United SC; USL League Two: Chicago FC United; Corpus Christi FC; Des Moines Menace; FC Golden State Force; North Carolina Fusion U23; SC United Bantams; South Georgia Tormenta FC 2; The Villages SC; Ventura County Fusion; Western Mass Pioneers	NISA: California United Strikers FC; Chattanooga FC; Detroit City FC; Los Angeles Force; Maryland Bobcats FC; Michigan Stars FC; New Amsterdam FC; San Diego 1904 FC; Stumptown AC; USL League One: Chattanooga Red Wolves SC; Forward Madison FC; Greenville Triumph SC; North Carolina FC; Richmond Kickers; South Georgia Tormenta FC; FC Tucson; Union Omaha	Austin Bold FC; Birmingham Legion; Charleston Battery; Charlotte Independence; Colorado Springs Switchbacks FC; El Paso Locomotive FC; FC Tulsa; Hartford Athletic; Indy Eleven; Las Vegas Lights FC; Louisville City FC; Memphis 901 FC; Miami FC; New Mexico United; Oakland Roots SC; OKC Energy FC; Orange County SC; Phoenix Rising FC; Pittsburgh Riverhounds SC; Rio Grande Valley FC Toros; Sacramento Republic FC; San Antonio FC; San Diego Loyal SC; Tampa Bay Rowdies	Atlanta United FC; Austin FC; Chicago Fire FC; Colorado Rapids; Columbus Crew SC; FC Cincinnati; FC Dallas; D.C. United; Houston Dynamo FC; Inter Miami CF; LA Galaxy; Los Angeles FC; Minnesota United FC; Nashville SC; New England Revolution; New York City FC; New York Red Bulls; Orlando City SC; Philadelphia Union; Portland Timbers; Real Salt Lake; San Jose Earthquakes; Seattle Sounders FC; Sporting Kansas City

== Number of teams by state ==
The eligible 2021 field represents a total of 34 states and the District of Columbia.

	States	Number	Teams
1	California	17	ASC San Diego, Cal FC, California United Strikers FC, Chula Vista FC, FC Davis, FC Golden State Force, LA Galaxy, Los Angeles FC, Los Angeles Force, Oakland Roots SC, Olympic Club, Orange County SC, Sacramento Republic FC, San Diego Loyal SC, San Diego 1904 FC, San Jose Earthquakes, Ventura County Fusion
2	Texas	11	Austin Bold FC, Austin FC, Corpus Christi FC, Denton Diablos FC, El Paso Locomotive FC, FC Dallas, Fort Worth Vaqueros FC, Houston Dynamo FC, NTX Rayados, Rio Grande Valley FC Toros, San Antonio FC
3	Florida	7	Inter Miami CF, Miami FC, Miami United FC U23, Naples United FC, Orlando City SC, Tampa Bay Rowdies, The Villages SC
4	Tennessee	5	Chattanooga FC, Chattanooga Red Wolves SC, Memphis 901 FC, Nashville SC, Nashville United
5	North Carolina	4	Charlotte Independence, North Carolina FC, North Carolina Fusion U23, Stumptown AC
5	Pennsylvania	4	Philadelphia Union, Pittsburgh Riverhounds SC, Vereinigung Erzgebirge, West Chester United SC
7	Arizona	3	FC Arizona, Phoenix Rising FC, FC Tucson
7	Colorado	3	Colorado Rapids, Colorado Springs Switchbacks FC, FC Boulder Harpos
7	Georgia	3	Atlanta United FC, South Georgia Tormenta FC, South Georgia Tormenta FC 2
7	Minnesota	3	Med City FC, Minneapolis City SC, Minnesota United FC
7	New Jersey	3	Atlantic City FC, FC Motown, New York Red Bulls
7	New York	3	New Amsterdam FC, New York City FC, New York Pancyprian-Freedoms
7	Ohio	3	Cleveland SC, Columbus Crew SC, FC Cincinnati
7	Oklahoma	3	FC Tulsa, OKC Energy FC, Tulsa Athletic
7	South Carolina	3	Charleston Battery, Greenville Triumph SC, SC United Bantams
16	Connecticut	2	Hartford Athletic, Newtown Pride FC
16	Illinois	2	Chicago FC United, Chicago Fire FC
16	Maryland	2	Christos FC, Maryland Bobcats FC
16	Massachusetts	2	New England Revolution, Western Mass Pioneers
16	Michigan	2	Detroit City FC, Michigan Stars FC
16	Virginia	2	Richmond Kickers, Virginia United
22	Alabama	1	Birmingham Legion
22	District of Columbia	1	D.C. United
22	Indiana	1	Indy Eleven
22	Iowa	1	Des Moines Menace
22	Kansas	1	Sporting Kansas City
22	Kentucky	1	Louisville City FC
22	Louisiana	1	Louisiana Krewe FC
22	Nebraska	1	Union Omaha
22	Nevada	1	Las Vegas Lights FC
22	New Mexico	1	New Mexico United
22	Oregon	1	Portland Timbers
22	Utah	1	Real Salt Lake
22	Washington	1	Seattle Sounders FC
22	Wisconsin	1	Forward Madison FC

States without a team in the Open Cup: Alaska, Arkansas, Delaware, Hawaii, Idaho, Maine, Mississippi, Missouri, Montana, New Hampshire, North Dakota, Rhode Island, South Dakota, Vermont, West Virginia, and Wyoming.

== Broadcasting ==
All matches from the first round to the final were expected to be streamed on ESPN+. U.S. Soccer and ESPN signed a 4-year deal to air the tournament in 2019.
