= 2020 U.S. Open Cup qualification =

2020 Lamar Hunt U.S. Open Cup qualification
Tournament details
- Dates: September 21 – November 24, 2019
- Teams: 88

Tournament statistics
- Matches played: 76
- Goals scored: 337 (4.43 per match)
- Top scorer: Mohamed Sesay (9 Goals)

The 2020 Lamar Hunt U.S. Open Cup tournament proper featured teams from all five tiers of the men's American soccer pyramid.

Qualification for the 2020 tournament included local qualifying matches contested by 88 teams, with a majority being amateur, and took place in late 2019 from September to November. One team also qualified by winning the 2019 National Amateur Cup, and other clubs playing in national leagues that are not fully professional qualified based on their results in 2019 league play.

The Open Division Local Qualifying tournament was launched in 2016 as an alternative to holding state and regional qualifying tournaments. Now, all teams from any US Soccer-affiliated leagues just need to register. The competition begins in the fall and all entrants are divided up regionally to minimize travel, with the teams that advance the furthest qualifying for the Lamar Hunt US Open Cup which will begin in the spring.

== National Amateur Cup ==
Newtown Pride FC defeated Horizon FC, 4–0, on Saturday, August 3, to win the 2019 National Amateur Cup and qualify for the 2020 U.S. Open Cup.

== National league track ==
=== National Premier Soccer League ===
The NPSL ranked its 87 eligible U.S.-based clubs based on results of its 2019 season for the purposes of qualification for the 2020 U.S. Open Cup.

The NPSL champion earned the top ranking, and the other finalist is second. The national semifinal loser from the region with the larger number of teams is ranked third, and the remaining national semifinalist is ranked fourth. The four regional final losers are ranked fifth through eighth based on the number of teams in their region, from largest to smallest. The remaining ranks are allocated among the regions based on their sizes and ensuring each of the NPSL's conferences has at least one team represented.

Due to a number of teams either leaving the NPSL or being unable to field a team due to the March 2020 tournament start, the following teams denied their invitations into the tournament: Miami FC (National Champion), New York Cosmos B (National Runner-up), Detroit City FC (quarterfinalist), Midland-Odessa Sockers FC, Chattanooga FC, and Brooklyn Italians.

The teams that qualified, in order of regional ranking, were:

Region	Teams
South	Tulsa Athletic (quarterfinalist), Naples United FC, Denton Diablos FC, Fort Worth Vaqueros FC
West	ASC San Diego (semifinalist), FC Arizona (quarterfinalist), FC Davis, Crossfire Redmond
Midwest	Cleveland SC (semifinalist), Minneapolis City SC, Med City FC
Northeast	Atlantic City FC, West Chester United SC, FC Motown

=== USL League Two ===
USL League Two elected to use the results of the 2019 USL League Two season to rank its 67 U.S.-based teams for the purposes of qualification for the 2020 U.S. Open Cup. The highest placing teams from each division, provided that they are American, are ranked first in order of points. The remaining teams are then ranked based on points regardless of division. The 2019 USL League Two regular-season standings tiebreaker system is invoked when needed.

Due to the tournament starting in late March 2020, two teams that would have qualified for the tournament opted to decline their invitations. The 2019 National Finalist Reading United AC and the National Champion Flint City Bucks both announced they would not take part in the Open Cup. Reading's decline breaks the club's record streak of consecutive U.S. Open Cup appearances at 12. Additionally, Mid-South Division champion Brazos Valley Cavalry FC also declined its invitation while Colorado Pride Switchbacks U23, the Mountain Division champion, folded following the season.

The rankings of the USL League Two teams for 2020 U.S. Open Cup qualification are shown in the table below.

Pos	Team	Points	Explanation
1	Des Moines Menace	36	Heartland Division champion
2	Western Mass Pioneers	36	Northeast Division champion
3	FC Golden State Force	34	Southwest Division champion
4	South Georgia Tormenta FC 2	32	Deep South Division champion
5	The Villages SC	32	Southeast Division champion
6	Chicago FC United	28	Great Lakes Division champion
7	North Carolina Fusion U23	26	South Atlantic Division champion
8	GPS Portland Phoenix	29	
9	SC United Bantams	29	
10	Ventura County Fusion	28	
11	Corpus Christi FC	26	

== Local qualifying ==
U.S. Soccer originally announced that 89 teams would participate in local qualifying, however this number was reduced to 88 before the start of round one. The teams represented 18 different states and the District of Columbia (21 different state associations) and featured teams from 26 different leagues. For the fifth year in a row, the most represented league was the United Premier Soccer League which entered 33 teams, which was two fewer than the 35 they entered in the previous year's competition, and six fewer than the 39 that participated in the 2018 qualifying tournament. Of the 88 teams, 53 had competed in the Open Division tournament before, leaving 35 new teams.

	States	Number
1	California	20
2	Colorado	10
2	Texas	10
4	Florida	8
5	Pennsylvania	7
6	Virginia	5
6	Maryland	5
8	Massachusetts	4
9	Michigan	3
9	New Jersey	3
11	Georgia	2
11	Louisiana	2
11	New York	2
11	South Carolina	2
15	District of Columbia	1
15	Illinois	1
15	Oregon	1
15	Tennessee	1
15	Utah	1

=== First qualifying round ===
The draw for the first qualifying round took place on August 26 with 42 matches originally being scheduled and five teams receiving byes into round two. However, due to one team being disqualified from the competition, three additional teams were given byes and the total number of matches was decreased to 40 on September 11. Most of the games were played on September 21 and 22. One game was postponed due to inclement weather and was later played on September 28.

==== East Region ====
September 21	Kendall Wanderers (Massachusetts)	0–5	(Massachusetts) Safira FC	Cambridge, Massachusetts
12:00 ET	Whelan (yellow card) 10'; Sweeney (yellow card) 35'; Arling (yellow card) 68'	Report	Jimenez 20, 78', (yellow card) 50'; Bomfim 54'; Rincon 71'; Teixeira (yellow card) 74'	Stadium: Danehy Park - Field 3

September 21	Juve-Pro Soccer (Massachusetts)	0–1	(Massachusetts) Brockton FC United	Ashland, Massachusetts
19:00 ET	Victor (yellow card) 66'; Pinheiro (yellow card) 68'; Louro (yellow card) 88'	Report	Monteiro (yellow card) 20'; Alves (yellow card) 37', (goal) 73'; Veiga (yellow card) 89'	Stadium: Ashland High School

September 21	SOCA (Virginia)	1–4	(Maryland) World Class Premier Elite FC	Charlottesville, Virginia
19:00 ET	Da Silva 16'; Rowe (yellow card) 64'	Report	Sesay 31'; Banjo 37'; Ajagu (yellow card) 44'; Toure 45'; Blystone 64'; Ankrah (yellow card) 85'	Stadium: Charlottesville High School - Stadium Turf Field

September 21	Steel FC (Pennsylvania)	3–1	(Maryland) Germantown City FC	Pittsburgh, Pennsylvania
19:45 ET	McDyer 15'; Virgara 37'; Lewandowski 39'	Report	Diego Velazquez 84'	Stadium: Shady Side Academy

September 22	CSA Westchester (New Jersey)	2–1	(New Jersey) Jackson Lions FC	Mahwah, New Jersey
12:00 ET	Riordan (yellow card) 30'; Katona 52'; Oakley 89'	USSF Report; TheCup.us Report	Calderon-Boteo 57'; Bailey (red card) 87'; Dickson (yellow card) 87'; Benjamin Vergara (yellow card) 87'	Stadium: Ramapo College of New Jersey

September 22	Steel Pulse FC (Maryland)	2–3	(Pennsylvania) Tartan Devils Oak Avalon	Elkridge, Maryland
14:00 ET	Keita 69'; Ndebugre 88'	USSF Report; TheCup.us Report	Shaffer (yellow card) 32'; Annan 43'; Casas 45'; Thiel 87'	Stadium: Troy Park

September 22	Danubia Swabian (Pennsylvania)	0–5	(Pennsylvania) West Chester United	Bryn Mawr, Pennsylvania
14:30 ET	Aguirre (yellow card) 17'; Hotruong (yellow card) 75'	Report	Bishop 4'; Wilson 24, 66, 84'; Bollinger 90'	Stadium: Rosemont College - Main Varsity Field

September 22	Ukrainian Nationals (Pennsylvania)	1–4	(Pennsylvania) Vereinigung Erzgebirge	North Wales, Pennsylvania
15:00 ET	Wright 53'; Arciprete (yellow card) 75'; Tsekirov (yellow card) 78'	Report	Shertzer 4, 45'; Antonini 75'; Mettee 76'	Stadium: Ukrainian American Sports Center - Main Turf Field

September 22	FC Millennium International (Maryland)	2–3	(Virginia) CD Huateras	Hyattsville, Maryland
18:00 ET	Cruz 1', (yellow card) 70'; Quincin (yellow card) 3' (yellow-red card) 72'; Colinders 60'	Report	Echeverría (yellow card) 19', (goal) 77'; Najar 22'; Martinez 72'; Rodriguez (yellow card) 82'	Stadium: Heurich Community Park - Turf Field

September 22	Doradus FC (Virginia)	1–2	(Virginia) Alianza Futbol Club	Woodbridge, Virginia
18:00 ET	Obour 89'	Report	Martinez 18'; Bailey 21'; Ramirez (yellow card) 29'; Arias (yellow card) 61'; Gavarrete (yellow card) 87'	Stadium: Howison Homestead Soccer Complex

September 22	Clifton Elite FC (New Jersey)	2–4	(New York (state)) Lansdowne Yonkers FC	Clifton, New Jersey
20:15 ET	Bello (yellow card) 66', (goal) 90, 90+1'; Lakhrif (yellow card) 83'	Report	Dillon 23, 45'; Arvidsson 36'; Andersen 44'	Stadium: Athenia Steel Recreation Complex

Received bye to second round of qualification:

- Christos FC (Maryland)
- Federal City Wanderers (Washington, D.C.)
- New York Pancyprian Freedoms (New York (state))
- United German Hungarians (Pennsylvania)
- Virginia United

==== Central Region ====
September 21	Celtic Cowboys Premier (Texas)	7–1	(Texas) Central Texas Lobos	Austin, Texas
12:00 CT	O'Brien 35, 42'; Riad (yellow card) 44'; Wright 56, 68, 84, 86'; Cperk 81'	Report	Ali 58'	Stadium: Onion Creek Soccer Complex - Field 8

September 21	Atletico Miami CF (Florida)	3–7	(Florida) Miami United FC U23	Miami, Florida
16:30 ET	Jaramillo 37'; Tomas 50'; Harvey 53'	Report	Fraggetti 8'; Riascos 13, 82'; Rodriguez 26', (yellow card) 46'; Stamatis 28, 34, 71'	Stadium: Kendall Soccer Park

September 21	NTX Rayados (Texas)	4–2	(Texas) FC Fort Worth Soccer Club	Balch Springs, Texas
17:00 CT	Ortiz (yellow card) 31'; Wilson 45'; Hernandez 53'; Sesay 71, 90'	Report	Matamoros 16'; Solorzano (yellow card) 35'; Guzman Jr. 89'	Stadium: Premier Park - Field 1

September 21	Club ATLetic (Georgia (U.S. state))	0–1	(Georgia (U.S. state)) Georgia Revolution FC Reserves	Sandy Spring, Georgia
19:00 ET	Henry (yellow card) 12'	USSF Report; TheCup.us Report	Sinclair (yellow card) 25'; Sandoval 30'	Stadium: Dunwoody Springs Elementary School

September 21	Coyotes FC (Texas)	2–3	(Texas) San Antonio Runners	Temple, Texas
19:00 CT	Camarena (yellow card) 16'; Jaimes-Diaz 34', (yellow card) 69'; Collins 72'	Report	Flores 6', (yellow card) 62'; Mendoza 49'; Maldonado 73'; Beltran (yellow card) 76'	Stadium: Holy Trinity Catholic High School, Field 1

September 21	Louisiana Krewe FC	5–2	(Louisiana) Northshore United	Lafayette, Louisiana
19:00 CT	Pimpao 15, 50, 64'; Caliman 21'; Barrozo 48'; Gremillion Jr (yellow card) 53'	Report	Baudean (yellow card) 20' (yellow-red card) 82'; Abdelaziz (yellow card) 31'; Guthrie (yellow card) 42'; McInnis 45'; Louisiana Krewe FC 67' (o.g.)	Stadium: St. Thomas More Catholic High School

September 21	Hurricane FC (Florida)	1–1 (9–8 p)	(Florida) International Soccer Association	Delray Beach, Florida
20:00 ET	Castellon 18'; Elizor (yellow card) 56'; Astudillo (yellow card) 62'; Wesselburg (yellow card) 64'	USSF Report; TheCup.us Report	Arcanjo (yellow card) 21'; Milord (yellow card) 42'; Andrade 71'; Garzon (yellow card) 120'; Fagiani (yellow card) 120'; Borges (red card) 120'	Stadium: Seacrest Soccer Complex - Field 1

September 22	Charleston United (South Carolina)	1–1 (2–4 p)	(South Carolina) Soda City Sorinex FC	Charleston, South Carolina
16:00 ET	Brito (yellow card) 49'; Carcamo 60'; Danna (yellow card) 105'	USSF Report; TheCup.us Report	Charleston United 23' (o.g.); Smith (yellow card) 53'; Pondy (yellow card) 58'; Jermstad (yellow card) 79'; Ortega (yellow card) 115'	Stadium: Drayton Hall Elementary School
	Penalties
	Penalty scored Penalty missed		Penalty scored Penalty missed

September 22	Athletic Katy FC (Texas)	Postponed	(Texas) Houston FC	Houston, Texas
11:00 CT		Report		Stadium: San Jacinto College South Campus

September 22	Lone Star Republic (Texas)	1–2	(Texas) Inocentes Futbol Club	Addison, Texas
14:00 CT	Faki (yellow card) 60'; Cantor 65'; Ketterhagen (yellow card) 70'; Gokhale (yellow card) 86' (yellow-red card) 89'	Report	Rodriguez 45'; Kovacevic 51'	Stadium: The Greenhill School - Frankel Field

September 22	Deportivo Lake Mary (Florida)	1-2 (a.e.t.)	(Florida) Orlando FC Wolves	Sanford, Florida
17:30 ET	Hernandez (yellow card) 16'; Ponce (yellow card) 57'; Cardona (yellow card) 73'; Salvagno 96'	Report	Leon (yellow card) 18'; Flemmings (yellow card) 86' (yellow-red card) 112'; Allen (yellow card) 99' (yellow-red card) 120'; Bond II 113'; Blackhurst 120'	Stadium: Sylvan Lake Park

September 22	Florida Soccer Soldiers	2–0	(Florida) Red Force FC	Miramar, Florida
18:00 ET	Andreo 7'; Gutierrez (yellow card) 13'; Valencia (yellow card) 33'; Ruiz de Somocurcio 49'; Orozco (yellow card) 55'; Rios (yellow card) 69'; Williams (red card) 90'	Report	Scott Gordon (yellow card) 33'	Stadium: Miramar Regional Park

September 22	Livonia City FC (Michigan)	2-2 (5–4 p)	(Michigan) Wayne County Sporting	Livonia, Michigan
20:30 ET	Dushkaj 56, 90'; Arton (red card) 90'	USSF Report; Livonia City FC PK Report	Al Shareefi 8', (yellow card) 90'; Barajas-Dias 32'; Chavira (yellow card) 74'; Cuevas (yellow card) 112'	Stadium: Schoolcraft College
	Penalties
	Bruno (penalty missed); Bechard (penalty scored); Smith (penalty scored); Smutek (penalty scored)		(penalty missed) Barajas-Dias

September 28 (Note: Match was postponed from originally scheduled date due to heavy rain.)	Athletic Katy FC (Texas)	3–3 (5–4 p)	(Texas) Houston FC	Houston, Texas
19:30 CT	Mosquera 11'; Osevwe 12, 16'; Medina (yellow card) 26' (yellow-red card) 90'; Varela (yellow card) 32'; Valencia Suárez (yellow card) 90'	USSF Report; TheCup.us Report	Parker (yellow card) 45'; Arney 49, 86, 93', (yellow card) 103'; Resendiz (yellow card) 75' (red card) 75'; Perlaza (yellow card) 85'	Stadium: Campbell Road Sports Park Stadium

Notes:

Received bye to second round of qualification:

- Ann Arbor FC (Michigan)
- Nashville United (Tennessee)
- Springfield FC (Illinois)

==== West Region ====
September 21	Chula Vista FC (California)	2–2 (5–4 p)	(California) Rebels Soccer Club	Chula Vista, California
16:30 PT	Martinez 1'; Chavez (yellow card) 43'; Rubio (yellow card) 45'; Diaz 45'; Hernandez (yellow card) 57'; Altamirano (yellow card) 71'; Gonzalez (yellow card) 80' (yellow-red card) 90'	USSF Report; TheCup.us Report	Burguillo 45'; Gonzalez (yellow card) 45', (goal) 65'; Padilla (yellow card) 45'; Lua (yellow card) 60'; Bennouna (yellow card) 90'	Stadium: Terra Nova Park

September 21	FC Denver (Colorado)	0–2	(Colorado) FC Boulder Harpos	Aurora, Colorado
19:00 MT	Peter Jacobson (yellow card) 51'	Report	Braun 26', (yellow card) 26'; Jaime (yellow card) 66'; Wheeler 78'	Stadium: Aurora Sports Park - Field 1

September 21	Logroñes Denver Soccer Club (Colorado)	2–6	Colorado Rovers	Denver, Colorado
19:30 MT	Salcido Jr (yellow card) 17'; Rodriguez (yellow card) 50'; Garcia 59'; Alvarez (yellow card) 85'; Montalvo 89'	Report	Emge (yellow card) 15', (goal) 18, 55'; Pena 19', (yellow card) 57'; Townsend 52'; Kotschau 65'; Herschberger 79'; Hughes (yellow card) 87'	Stadium: North Stadium/1st Bank Field

September 21	USA Soccer Stars FC (California)	1–2	Alta California Sol	Lake Forest, California
19:00 PT	Santos (yellow card) 17'; Pacas (yellow card) 45'; Marshall (yellow card) 50', (goal) 83'; Baisie-Mensah (yellow card) 80'; Lopez (yellow card) 84'	Report	Lozano (yellow card) 10'; Lagunas 13, 76'; Lopez (yellow card) 61'	Stadium: Lake Forest Sports Park - Field B

September 21	Newport FC (California)	1–4	(California) SC Trojans FC	Irvine, California
19:00 PT	Lopez 76'	Report	Dilla 16, 17'; Queen IV 23'; Azage 38'	Stadium: Orange County Great Park - Field 15

September 21	L.A. Monsters FC (California)	4–0	(California) Valley United SC	Irvine, California
19:30 PT	Delgado 3'; Vargas 54'; Valley United SC 82' (o.g.); Meza 84'	Report	Parks (yellow card) 38'	Stadium: Orange County Great Park - Field 19

September 21	Real San Jose (California)	1–1 (2–4 p)	(California) Outbreak FC	San Jose, California
19:30 PT	Castro 3'; Martinez (yellow card) 60'; Katser (yellow card) 118'	USSF Report; TheCup.us Report	Barajas 10'; Sanchez (yellow card) 78'; Kolano (yellow card) 104'	Stadium: PAL Stadium

September 21	Oakland Stompers (California)	1–0	(California) Contra Costa FC	Oakland, California
20:30 PT	Hinostroza 68'; Coulibaly (yellow card) 84'	Report	Mattes (yellow card) 38'; Hernandez (yellow card) 45'	Stadium: Raimondi Park

September 22	San Juan FC (Utah)	2–0	(Oregon) IPS/Marathon Taverna	Herriman, Utah
13:00 MT	Escobar 34'; Kostovski (yellow card) 45', (goal) 54'; Kanyare (yellow card) 79'	Report	Hernandez-Tavera (yellow card) 24'; Romac (yellow card) 64'; King (yellow card) 85'; Atanasov (yellow card) 90'	Stadium: Zions Bank Stadium

September 22	Athletic Club of Sloan’s Lake (Colorado)	0–5	(Colorado) Azteca FC	Lakewood, Colorado
14:00 MT	Abiar (yellow card) 62'	Report	Richart 13, 23'; Delgado 17'; Anaya 52, 90', (yellow card) 74'	Stadium: Lakewood Memorial Field

September 22	Colorado Rush	3–2 (a.e.t.)	(Colorado) Club El Azul	Lakewood, Colorado
15:00 MT	Gaido (yellow card) 63'; Hartman (yellow card) 63'; Jones 67', (yellow card) 95'; Barancoski 107, 112', (yellow card) 113'; Kiger (yellow card) 115'; Olvera (yellow card) 120'	USSF Report; TheCup.us Report	Ruiz 2', (yellow card) 109' (yellow-red card) 113'; Granados (yellow card) 13'; Garcia Jr. (yellow card) 14' (yellow-red card) 120'; Rojas (yellow card) 59'; Lopez (yellow card) 70'; Aguilera (yellow card) 80' (yellow-red card) 98'; Reza 113'; Alvarado (yellow card) 113'; Chavez (red card) 120'	Stadium: Addenbrooke Park

September 22	Quickening (California)	2–9	(California) Cal FC	Lancaster, California
14:00 PT	Barron 37'; Diaz 75'	Report	Barouch 15, 32'; Raygoza 29, 44, 58'; Lomeli 38'; Alfaro 42'; Cazarez 77'; Aghasi 86'	Stadium: Lancaster National Soccer Center - Field 33

September 22	Gam United FC (Colorado)	1–2	(Colorado) FC Union Jerez	Denver, Colorado
16:00 MT	Austin 1'; Soumah (yellow card) 45' (yellow-red card) 87'	Report	Hernandez Jr. (yellow card) 6' (yellow-red card) 90', (goal) 48'; Rodriguez 22'; Gonzalez (yellow card) 85'	Stadium: Lowry Sports Complex Park - Turf Field 2

September 22	Oxnard Guerreros FC (California)	2–0	(California) Santa Monica United FC	Oxnard, California
18:30 PT	Tamayo (yellow card) 53', (goal) 74'; Aguilar (yellow card) 59'; Yepez 61'; Estrada (yellow card) 84'	Report	McKenna (yellow card) 52'; Santana (yellow card) 60'	Stadium: Del Sol Stadium

September 22	Academica SC (California)	4–1	(California) PV United	Turlock, California
19:00 PT	Golbad 15'; Madrigal 48'; Ceja 61'; Hernandez 77'; Carmona (yellow card) 85'	Report	Alberto Garcia 86'	Stadium: Our Lady of the Assumption Park

September 22	JASA RWC (California)	0–4	(California) Olympic Club	Redwood City, California
19:00 PT	Demirlioglu (yellow card) 8'; Abdel-Shafi (yellow card) 50'	Report	Fondy 45'; Rovira 48'; Kovar (yellow card) 58', (goal) 65'; Sanner 72'	Stadium: Red Morton Community Park - Bechet Field

=== Second qualifying round ===
The draw for the second qualifying round took place on September 23. Most of the games were played on October 19 and 20. One game was postponed due to inclement weather and was played on November 2.

==== East Region ====
October 19	Safira FC (Massachusetts)	0–2	(Massachusetts) Brockton FC United	Somerville, Massachusetts
13:00 ET	Andrade (yellow card) 37'; Almeida (yellow card) 45'; Bomfim (yellow card) 86'; Teixeira (yellow card) 87'	Report	Alves 77, 90'; Carvalho (yellow card) 88'	Stadium: Dilboy Stadium

October 19	CD Huateras (Virginia)	5–4 (a.e.t.)	(Maryland) World Class Premier Elite FC	Woodbridge, Virginia
18:00 ET	Diaz (yellow card) 19'; Alfaro 45, 48, 77'; Najar (yellow card) 58', (goal) 118'; Alas (yellow card) 71'; Rodriguez (yellow card) 87'; Gusman (yellow card) 95', (goal) 105'	Report	Kapawa (yellow card) 52', (goal) 85'; Joe (yellow card) 71'; Kao 86, 90'; Banjo 107'	Stadium: Howison Homestead Soccer Complex - Field 1

October 19	West Chester United (Pennsylvania)	4–2	(New York (state)) Lansdowne Yonkers FC	West Chester, Pennsylvania
19:00 ET	Bishop (yellow card) 23', (goal) 45, 67'; Bartosinski 30'; Wilson (yellow card) 50'; Bollinger (yellow card) 58'; Fincher (yellow card) 68'; Greer 90'	Report	Danso 36', (yellow card) 81'; Dillon 89'	Stadium: West Chester United Turf Field

October 20	CSA Westchester (New Jersey)	0–2	(New York (state)) New York Pancyprian Freedoms	Mahwah, New Jersey
12:00 ET	Garcia (red card) 27'	USSF Report; TheCup.us Report	Matteo (yellow card) 27'; Himeno 77'; Psarras 90+4'	Stadium: Ramapo College of New Jersey - Stadium Field

October 20	United German Hungarians (Pennsylvania)	0–2 (a.e.t.)	(Pennsylvania) Vereinigung Erzgebirge	Oakford, Pennsylvania
15:00 ET	Manzo (yellow card) 112'	USSF Report; TheCup.us Report	Fahy 100'; Bastidas 105'	Stadium: Trifecta Sporting Club - Stadium Field

October 20	Virginia United	2–1	(Virginia) Alianza Futbol Club	Woodbridge, Virginia
18:00 ET	Majano 6, 32'; Hernandez (yellow card) 65'; Marquez Jr. (yellow card) 90'	Report	Lazo (yellow card) 58'; Gavarrete (yellow card) 58'; Bailey 68', (yellow card) 88'	Stadium: George Hampton Middle School

October 20	Christos FC (Maryland)	7–1	(Washington, D.C.) Federal City Wanderers	Glen Burnie, Maryland
18:00 ET	Scott 10'; Caringi III 14, 62, 66'; Saunderson (yellow card) 24'; A. Lee 38, 65'; Albrecht 78'	Report	Kraus 22'	Stadium: Glen Burnie High School

October 20	Steel FC (Pennsylvania)	3–1 (a.e.t.)	(Pennsylvania) Tartan Devils Oak Avalon	Pittsburgh, Pennsylvania
19:00 ET	Bischoff (yellow card) 58'; Tartan Devils Oak Avalon 70' (o.g.); Heuler 101'; Ligeti (yellow card) 104'; Flick 115'	Report	Shaffer 57'; Luffy (yellow card) 63'	Stadium: Highmark Stadium

==== Central Region ====
October 19	Soda City Sorinex FC (South Carolina)	Postponed	(Georgia (U.S. state)) Georgia Revolution FC Reserves	Columbia, South Carolina
16:00 ET		Report		Stadium: Saluda Shoals Soccer Park

October 19	NTX Rayados (Texas)	7–0	(Texas) Inocentes Futbol Club	Balch Springs, Texas
19:00 CT	Sesay 7, 25, 42, 76'; Wilson (yellow card) 47'; Salas (yellow card) 58'; Ortiz (yellow card) 74'; Martinez 80'; Toledo (yellow card) 85'; Frias 87'	Report	Armas (yellow card) 30'; Rodriguez (yellow card) 50' (yellow-red card) 85'; Kovacevic (yellow card) 53'; Alcala (yellow card) 78'	Stadium: Premier Park - Field 1

October 19	San Antonio Runners (Texas)	0–3	(Texas) Celtic Cowboys Premier	San Antonio, Texas
19:00 CT	Kamal (yellow card) 32'; Okeme (yellow card) 90'	Report	O'Brien 30'; Wright 67'; Nhew 69'	Stadium: UTSA Campus Recreation Field Complex - South

October 19	Louisiana Krewe FC	3–2	(Texas) Athletic Katy FC	Lafayette, Louisiana
19:00 CT	Vaz Poca (yellow card) 44'; Barrozo 45'; Pimpao 65, 88'; Gravolet (yellow card) 73'	Report	Mosquera 22, 76'; Echeverri (yellow card) 32'; Zambrano (yellow card) 35' (yellow-red card) 45'; Suárez (yellow card) 45' (yellow-red card) 59'; Nfono (yellow card) 45' (yellow-red card) 64'; Zuniga (yellow card) 60'	Stadium: St. Thomas More Catholic High School

October 19	Springfield FC (Illinois)	0–8	(Tennessee) Nashville United	Springfield, Illinois
19:00 CT	England (yellow card) 58' (yellow-red card) 65'	Report	Hristov 17, 83'; Kozic 55, 75'; Bailey (yellow card) 58'; Bonilla 76, 90'; Paynter 86'; Whitsett 89'	Stadium: Springfield Area Soccer Association Soccer Complex

October 19	Ann Arbor FC (Michigan)	2–6	(Michigan) Livonia City FC	Brighton, Michigan
20:00 ET	Djerisilo 38, 64', (yellow card) 40'	Report	Dushkaj 18, 46'; Versteeg 53'; Hintzmen (yellow card) 58'; Cole 81'; Smith 83, 85'	Stadium: Legacy Center Sports Complex

October 20	Orlando FC Wolves (Florida)	1–7	(Florida) Hurricane FC	Sanford, Florida
17:00 ET	Clark (yellow card) 42'; Blackhurst (yellow card) 68'; Shanko 68'; Follensbee (yellow card) 80'; Farro (yellow card) 81'	Report	Murano 25'; Castellon 27, 56'; Astudillo (yellow card) 35'; Wesselburg (yellow card) 64', (goal) 87'; De Lacerda 64'; Nichol 85'; Najera 88'	Stadium: Sylvan Lake Park

October 20	Florida Soccer Soldiers (Florida)	1–2	(Florida) Miami United FC U23	Miramar, Florida
18:00 ET	Andreo (yellow card) 34'; Gutierrez (yellow card) 76'; Valencia 81'	Report	Solari 46'; Rodriguez (yellow card) 73'; Alvarez 90'	Stadium: Miramar Regional Park

November 2 (Note: Match was postponed from originally scheduled date due to weather.)	Soda City Sorinex FC (South Carolina)	4–2	(Georgia (U.S. state)) Georgia Revolution FC Reserves	Columbia, South Carolina
16:00 ET	Hanson 17'; Mukofsky 28'; Bryan 37', (yellow card) 75'; Crooks 90'	Report	Pugh 72'; Goncalves (yellow card) 82'; Madichie 82'	Stadium: Saluda Shoals Soccer Park

==== West Region ====
October 19	Chula Vista FC (California)	3–3 (2–1 p)	(California) Academica SC	Chula Vista, California
15:15 PT	Diaz (yellow card) 54', (goal) 90'; Meza 55, 75'; Rubio (yellow card) 79'; Martinez (yellow card) 112'	Report	Hernandez 21'; Golbad 29, 60'; Carmona (yellow card) 105'; Gutierrez (yellow card) 111'; Cazares (yellow card) 113'	Stadium: Terra Nova Park

October 19	Cal FC (California)	3–1	(California) Alta California Sol	Irvine, California
18:30 PT	Raygoza 30, 35'; Ortiz 90'	Report	Luna (yellow card) 60'; Hernandez 62'	Stadium: Orange County Great Park - Field 16

October 19	Outbreak FC (California)	1–7	(California) Oxnard Guerreros FC	Irvine, California
19:00 PT	Kornock (yellow card) 43'; Barajas 44'; Sanchez (yellow card) 44'; Bagheri (yellow card) 64'	Report	Estrada 29', (yellow card) 41'; Frame 43, 49'; Gonzalez 44, 86, 88'; Corzo 81'	Stadium: Orange County Great Park - Field 19

October 19	Olympic Club (California)	4–2	(California) Oakland Stompers	San Francisco, California
19:00 PT	Kovar 10'; Fondy 21, 53'; Burke 44'; Rickards (yellow card) 52'; Toth (yellow card) 70'; Harms (yellow card) 73'; Zaher (yellow card) 90'	Report	Sanchez Ruiz (yellow card) 30'; Molinari (yellow card) 49'; Hakim (yellow card) 57'; Rashid 61'; Hatifie 70', (yellow card) 73'	Stadium: Beach Chalet Soccer Fields

October 20	FC Union Jerez (Colorado)	2–3 (a.e.t.)	(Colorado) Azteca FC	Broomfield, Colorado
14:00 MT	Vazquez 57'; Freyre (yellow card) 78'; Talavera 82'	Report	Gutierrez 7'; Cuevas 23, 113'; Perez (yellow card) 110'; Rascon (yellow card) 118'; Gonzalez Jr. (yellow card) 119'	Stadium: Broomfield Commons - Field TBD

October 20	FC Boulder Harpos (Colorado)	6–0	(Colorado) Colorado Rush	Boulder, Colorado
15:00 MT	Mayfield 3'; Braun 23, 37'; Wheeler 45'; Whittle 55, 60'	Report		Stadium: Fairview High School

October 20	Colorado Rovers	2–1	(Utah) San Juan FC	Commerce City, Colorado
17:00 MT	Brovsky (yellow card) 12'; Coit (yellow card) 45'; Adam (yellow card) 61'; Seger 65'; Emge (yellow card) 77'; Hanlin 81'	Report	Carter (yellow card) 9'; Venegas (yellow card) 42'; Escobar 47', (yellow card) 90+2'; Kostovski (yellow card) 77'; Savage Jr. (yellow card) 86'; Ngnepi (yellow card) 90+5'	Stadium: Dick's Sporting Goods Park - Field 8

October 20	SC Trojans FC (California)	1–4	(California) L.A. Monsters FC	Irvine, California
19:15 MT	Romer 33'; McCarthy (yellow card) 61'	Report	Vargas 4'; Rojas 8'; Delgado 42'; Alvarez (yellow card) 59'; Cando 79'	Stadium: Orange County Great Park - Field 19

=== Third qualifying round ===
The draw for the third qualifying round took place on October 21. The games were played on November 23 and 24. It was originally stated that a fourth qualifying round may be necessary on the weekend of December 21–22, however U.S. Soccer announced in late November that the twelve winners from this round will advance to the first round proper.

==== East Region ====
November 24	Brockton FC United (Massachusetts)	0–1	(New York (state)) New York Pancyprian Freedoms	Everett, Massachusetts
12:30 ET	Teixeira (yellow card) 43'	USSF Report; TheCup.us Report	Ledula 3', (yellow card) 20'	Stadium: Everett Memorial Stadium
Note: Game was abandoned in the 53rd minute due to heavy rain with the Pancyprian Freedoms holding the lead

November 24	Vereinigung Erzgebirge (Pennsylvania)	2–1	(Pennsylvania) West Chester United	Warminster, Pennsylvania
14:30 ET	Antonini 35', (yellow card) 71'; Razaq (yellow card) 46'; Neumann 80'	USSF Report; TheCup.us Report	Poarch (yellow card) 82'; Gonzalez 84'; Bartosinski (red card) 90'	Stadium: William Tennent High School

November 24	Christos FC (Maryland)	3–2	(Pennsylvania) Steel FC	Glen Burnie, Maryland
17:00 ET	Caringi III 3'; A. Lee 15'; Scott (yellow card) 50'; N. Lee 80'	USSF Report; TheCup.us Report	Virgara 56'; Ligeti (yellow card) 70'; McDyer 80'	Stadium: North County High School

November 24	CD Huateras (Virginia)	1–3	Virginia United	Woodbridge, Virginia
17:00 ET	Najar 10' (yellow card) 53' (yellow-red card) 90'; López (yellow card) 34'; Ortiz (yellow card) 62' (yellow-red card) 90'; Gusman (red card) 90'	USSF Report; TheCup.us Report	Osorio 20, 63, 90'; Etienne (yellow card) 73'; Otero (yellow card) 83'	Stadium: Howison Homestead Soccer Complex

==== Central Region ====
November 23	Miami United FC U23 (Florida)	4–0	(Florida) Hurricane FC	Miami, Florida
19:00 ET	Dominguez 7'; Gordon 23'; Alvarez 37'; Stamatis 45'	USSF Report; TheCup.us Report	Elizor (yellow card) 31'	Stadium: Kendall Soccer Park

November 23	Soda City Sorinex FC (South Carolina)	0–4	(Tennessee) Nashville United	Columbia, South Carolina
19:00 ET	Mukofsky (yellow card) 22'; Carpio (yellow card) 38'; Castro (yellow card) 40'; Crooks (yellow card) 74'	USSF Report; TheCup.us Report	Hristov 5, 89'; Paynter 15, 64'; Collins (yellow card) 70'	Stadium: Saluda Shoals Soccer Park

November 23	Louisiana Krewe FC	1–0	(Michigan) Livonia City FC	Lafayette, Louisiana
19:00 CT	Mboungou (yellow card) 44'; Barrozo 70' (pen.)	USSF Report; TheCup.us Report	Versteeg (yellow card) 69'; Johnson (yellow card) 81'; Dushkaj (yellow card) 85'; Bourlier (yellow card) 90'	Stadium: St. Thomas More Catholic High School

November 23	NTX Rayados (Texas)	3–0	(Texas) Celtic Cowboys Premier	Balch Springs, Texas
19:00 CT	Sesay 56, 70, 78'	USSF Report; TheCup.us Report	Wright (yellow card) 83'	Stadium: Premier Park, Field 1

==== West Region ====
November 23	Chula Vista FC (California)	2–2 (5–4 p)	(California) L.A. Monsters FC	Chula Vista, California
14:30 PT	Rodriguez 34'; Gonzalez (yellow card) 75'; Rubio 81'	USSF Report; TheCup.us Report	Alvarez (yellow card) 33'; Corona (yellow card) 35'; Cando 56'; Meza 74' (yellow card) 108'	Stadium: Terra Nova Park
	Penalties
	Penalty scored		Penalty scored Penalty missed

November 23	Azteca FC (Colorado)	1–3	(California) Olympic Club	Aurora, Colorado
18:00 MT	Anaya (yellow card) 43' (yellow-red card) 90'; Richart 48' (pen.) (red card) 90'; Miranda (yellow card) 68'; Barraza (yellow card) 90'	USSF Report; TheCup.us Report	Fondy 5'; Burke 63'; Ayala-Hil 86'; Toth (yellow card) 90'	Stadium: Aurora Public Schools Stadium

November 23	Oxnard Guerreros FC (California)	1–2	(California) Cal FC	Oxnard, California
18:30 PT	Yepez (yellow card) 5'; Frame (yellow card) 28'; Cervantes (yellow card) 60'; Corzo 71'; De Jong (yellow card) 82' (yellow-red card) 90'; Rivera (yellow card) 90'	USSF Report; TheCup.us Report	Raygoza 2'; Wbias (yellow card) 39'; Alfaro 47'	Stadium: Del Sol Stadium

November 24	FC Boulder Harpos (Colorado)	4–0	(Colorado) Colorado Rovers	Boulder, Colorado
14:00 MT	Braun 3, 81'; Wheeler 36, 76'; Mejia (yellow card) 51'	USSF Report; TheCup.us Report	Herselman (yellow card) 17'	Stadium: Fairview High School

=== Top goalscorers ===
Rank	Player	Team	Goals	By round		
Rank	Player	Team	Goals	Q1	Q2	Q3
1	(Sierra Leone) Mohamed Sesay	NTX Rayados	9	2	4	3
2	(United States) William Raygoza	Cal FC	6	3	2	1
3	(United States) Freddie Braun	FC Boulder Harpos	5	1	2	2
3	(United States) Henrique Pimpao	Louisiana Krewe FC	5	3	2	0
3	(United States) Christopher Wright	Celtic Cowboys Premier	5	4	1	0
4	(United States) Pete Caringi III	Christos FC	4	X	3	1
4	(United States) Ardit Dushkaj	Livonia City FC	4	2	2	0
4	(United States) Matthew Fondy	Olympic Club	4	1	2	1
4	(Bulgaria) Georgi Hristov	Nashville United	4	X	2	2
4	(United States) William Stamatis	Miami United FC U23	4	3	0	1
4	(United States) Shane Wheeler	FC Boulder Harpos	4	1	1	2

== See also ==
- 2019 NPSL season
- 2019 USL League Two season
