= 2020 U.S. Open Cup =

Canceled edition of cup competition in American soccer

2020 Lamar Hunt U.S. Open Cup
Tournament details
- Country: United States
- Teams: 100

Final positions
- Champions: Canceled

The 2020 Lamar Hunt U.S. Open Cup was planned to be the 107th edition of the U.S. Open Cup, a knockout cup competition in American soccer. Atlanta United FC was the defending champion after defeating Minnesota United FC in the 2019 final. The competition was suspended on March 13, 2020, before the first round fixtures, because of the COVID-19 pandemic, and later canceled on August 17. Despite the tournament's cancelation, the spot for the 2021 CONCACAF Champions League was awarded to the defending champion, Atlanta United FC.

== Qualification ==
This edition was planned to feature 100 teams, including 62 professional sides—both modern-era records. Entrants included the American clubs from across the soccer leagues system, with timing determined by league division. These include the 23 American clubs from Major League Soccer and clubs from the USL Championship and USL League One that are not owned or operated by an MLS team; MLS-affiliated clubs from these two leagues are eligible. Additionally, clubs from the National Independent Soccer Association (NISA), a sanctioned Division III league, were set to take part. This is the first time two professional leagues from the same tier have both competed in the tournament since 2017.

USL League Two and the National Premier Soccer League qualified teams based on previous season standings. Quantity of teams is determined by U.S. Soccer. Local qualifying was done by tournament and held in 2019. It featured 88 mostly amateur teams representing 18 different states and the District of Columbia (21 different state soccer associations). 12 teams qualified out of this tournament. Finally, as with the previous year, the reigning champion of the National Amateur Cup, Newtown Pride FC, automatically qualify for the tournament proper.

The 2020 edition of the U.S. Open Cup was planned to include a change in qualifying for professional teams. All Division II and Division III teams were to enter together in the second round, while Major League Soccer teams were planned to enter in the third and fourth rounds. The four 2020 CONCACAF Champions League qualifiers plus the four best American non-qualifiers in each 2019 MLS conference would enter in the fourth round; the remaining clubs would enter in the third round.

The U.S. Open Cup was scheduled to begin in March 2020, its earliest calendar date since 1995. The final was scheduled to take place in either early August or late September. The earlier start would have overlapped with the NCAA soccer season, causing lower-division teams to be unable to field their full lineups; Reading United AC and Flint City Bucks, both of USL League Two, along with Midland-Odessa Sockers FC of the National Premier Soccer League, announced they would not take part in the tournament due to this reason.

Enter in First Round		Enter in Second Round		Enter in Third Round	Enter in Round of 32
Open Division		Division III	Division II	Division I	
ANFEEU/USASA/USCS/USSSA; 13 teams	NPSL/USL League Two; 25 teams	NISA/USL League One; 14 teams	USL Championship; 25 teams	MLS; 23 teams	
ANFEEU: Virginia United; USASA: Cal FC; Christos FC; Louisiana Krewe FC; Miami United FC U23; Nashville United; Newtown Pride FC (2019 NAC champion); New York Pancyprian-Freedoms; NTX Rayados; Olympic Club; Vereinigung Erzgebirge; USCS: Chula Vista FC; USSSA: FC Boulder Harpos	NPSL: ASC San Diego; Atlantic City FC; Cleveland SC; Crossfire Redmond; Denton Diablos FC; FC Arizona; FC Davis; FC Motown; Fort Worth Vaqueros; Med City FC; Minneapolis City SC; Naples United FC; Tulsa Athletic; West Chester United SC; USL League Two: Chicago FC United; Corpus Christi FC; Des Moines Menace; FC Golden State Force; GPS Portland Phoenix; North Carolina Fusion U23; SC United Bantams; South Georgia Tormenta FC 2; The Villages SC; Ventura County Fusion; Western Mass Pioneers	NISA: California United Strikers FC; Chattanooga FC; Detroit City FC; Los Angeles Force; Michigan Stars FC; Oakland Roots; San Diego 1904 FC; Stumptown Athletic; USL League One: Chattanooga Red Wolves SC; Forward Madison FC; Greenville Triumph SC; Richmond Kickers; South Georgia Tormenta FC; Union Omaha	Austin Bold FC; Birmingham Legion; Charleston Battery; Charlotte Independence; Colorado Springs Switchbacks FC; El Paso Locomotive FC; FC Tulsa; Hartford Athletic; Indy Eleven; Las Vegas Lights FC; Louisville City FC; Memphis 901 FC; Miami FC; New Mexico United; North Carolina FC; OKC Energy FC; Orange County SC; Phoenix Rising FC; Pittsburgh Riverhounds SC; Reno 1868 FC; Sacramento Republic FC; Saint Louis FC; San Antonio FC; San Diego Loyal SC; Tampa Bay Rowdies	Chicago Fire FC; Colorado Rapids; Columbus Crew SC; FC Cincinnati; FC Dallas; Houston Dynamo; Inter Miami CF; Nashville SC; Orlando City SC; San Jose Earthquakes; Sporting Kansas City	Atlanta United FC; D.C. United; LA Galaxy; Los Angeles FC; Minnesota United FC; New England Revolution; New York City FC; New York Red Bulls; Philadelphia Union; Portland Timbers; Real Salt Lake; Seattle Sounders FC

- $: Winner of $25,000 bonus for advancing the furthest in the competition from their respective divisions.
- $$: Winner of $100,000 for being the runner-up in the competition.
- $$$: Winner of $300,000 for winning the competition.

== Number of teams by state ==
The 2020 Open Cup field represents a total of 36 states and the District of Columbia.

	States	Number	Teams
1	California	17	ASC San Diego, Cal FC, California United Strikers FC, Chula Vista FC, FC Davis, FC Golden State Force, LA Galaxy, Los Angeles FC, Los Angeles Force, Oakland Roots, Olympic Club, Orange County SC, Sacramento Republic FC, San Diego Loyal SC, San Diego 1904 FC, San Jose Earthquakes, Ventura County Fusion
2	Texas	9	Austin Bold FC, Corpus Christi FC, Denton Diablos FC, El Paso Locomotive FC, FC Dallas, Fort Worth Vaqueros FC, Houston Dynamo, NTX Rayados, San Antonio FC
3	Florida	7	Inter Miami CF, Miami FC, Miami United FC U23, Naples United FC, Orlando City SC, Tampa Bay Rowdies, The Villages SC
4	Tennessee	5	Chattanooga FC, Chattanooga Red Wolves SC, Memphis 901 FC, Nashville SC, Nashville United
5	North Carolina	4	Charlotte Independence, North Carolina FC, North Carolina Fusion U23, Stumptown Athletic
5	Pennsylvania	4	Philadelphia Union, Pittsburgh Riverhounds SC, Vereinigung Erzgebirge, West Chester United SC
7	Colorado	3	Colorado Rapids, Colorado Springs Switchbacks FC, FC Boulder Harpos
7	Georgia	3	Atlanta United FC, South Georgia Tormenta FC, South Georgia Tormenta FC 2
7	Minnesota	3	Med City FC, Minneapolis City SC, Minnesota United FC
7	New Jersey	3	Atlantic City FC, FC Motown, New York Red Bulls
7	Ohio	3	Cleveland SC, Columbus Crew SC, FC Cincinnati
7	Oklahoma	3	FC Tulsa, OKC Energy FC, Tulsa Athletic
7	South Carolina	3	Charleston Battery, Greenville Triumph SC, SC United Bantams
14	Arizona	2	FC Arizona, Phoenix Rising FC
14	Connecticut	2	Hartford Athletic, Newtown Pride FC
14	Illinois	2	Chicago FC United, Chicago Fire FC
14	Massachusetts	2	New England Revolution, Western Mass Pioneers
14	Michigan	2	Detroit City FC, Michigan Stars FC
14	Nevada	2	Las Vegas Lights FC, Reno 1868 FC
14	New York	2	New York City FC, New York Pancyprian-Freedoms
14	Virginia	2	Richmond Kickers, Virginia United
14	Washington	2	Crossfire Redmond, Seattle Sounders FC
23	Alabama	1	Birmingham Legion
23	District of Columbia	1	D.C. United
23	Indiana	1	Indy Eleven
23	Iowa	1	Des Moines Menace
23	Kansas	1	Sporting Kansas City
23	Kentucky	1	Louisville City FC
23	Louisiana	1	Louisiana Krewe FC
23	Maine	1	GPS Portland Phoenix
23	Maryland	1	Christos FC
23	Missouri	1	Saint Louis FC
23	Nebraska	1	Union Omaha
23	New Mexico	1	New Mexico United
23	Oregon	1	Portland Timbers
23	Utah	1	Real Salt Lake
23	Wisconsin	1	Forward Madison FC

States without a team in the Open Cup: Alaska, Arkansas, Delaware, Hawaii, Idaho, Mississippi, Montana, New Hampshire, North Dakota, Rhode Island, South Dakota, Vermont, West Virginia, and Wyoming.

== Match details ==
All times local to game site.

On March 13, 2020, U.S. Soccer announced that the U.S. Open Cup would be temporarily suspended due to the global coronavirus pandemic. Several participating leagues, including MLS and USL, had already announced month-long suspensions of activities. The tournament was canceled on August 17, 2020, with all qualified teams planned to participate in the 2021 edition.

=== First round ===
The first round of the Open Cup was scheduled to take place on March 24 and 25. There would have been 19 matches between 13 local qualifiers, 14 NPSL, and 11 USL2 teams. Teams were paired geographically, and pairings were announced on January 22. The fixtures were suspended on March 13 due to the COVID-19 pandemic.

TBD	Western Mass Pioneers (USL2)	P-P	GPS Portland Phoenix (USL2)	Ludlow, Massachusetts
				Stadium: Lusitano Stadium

TBD	West Chester United SC (NPSL)	P-P	Vereinigung Erzgebirge (LQ)	West Chester, Pennsylvania
				Stadium: WCUSC/PF Kildare's Pub Turf Field

TBD	North Carolina Fusion U23 (USL2)	P-P	SC United Bantams (USL2)	High Point, North Carolina
				Stadium: BB&T Point

TBD	Virginia United (LQ)	P-P	Christos FC (LQ)	Woodbridge, Virginia
				Stadium: Howiston Homestead Soccer Complex

TBD	Chicago FC United (USL2)	P-P	Minneapolis City SC (NPSL)	Bridgeview, Illinois
				Stadium: SeatGeek Stadium

TBD	Tulsa Athletic (NPSL)	P-P	Fort Worth Vaqueros (NPSL)	Tulsa, Oklahoma
				Stadium: Case Soccer Complex at Oral Roberts University

TBD	ASC San Diego (NPSL)	P-P	Chula Vista FC (LQ)	La Jolla, California
				Stadium: Triton Soccer Stadium

TBD	Cal FC (LQ)	P-P	Ventura County Fusion (USL2)	Irvine, California
				Stadium: Orange County Great Park Field 5

TBD	The Villages SC (USL2)	P-P	South Georgia Tormenta FC 2 (USL2)	Summerfield, Florida
				Stadium: The Villages Soccer Complex

TBD	FC Motown (NPSL)	P-P	New York Pancyprian-Freedoms (LQ)	Montclair, New Jersey
				Stadium: MSU Soccer Park at Pittser Field

TBD	Atlantic City FC (NPSL)	P-P	Newtown Pride FC (LQ)	Glassboro, New Jersey
				Stadium: Rowan University Soccer Stadium

TBD	Miami United FC U23 (LQ)	P-P	Naples United FC (NPSL)	Hialeah, Florida
				Stadium: Ted Hendricks Stadium

TBD	Louisiana Krewe FC (LQ)	P-P	Corpus Christi FC (USL2)	Lafayette, Louisiana
				Stadium: Ragin' Cajuns Soccer/Track Facility

TBD	Nashville United (LQ)	P-P	Cleveland SC (NPSL)	Nashville, Tennessee
				Stadium: Vanderbilt University Soccer/Lacrosse Complex

TBD	Des Moines Menace (USL2)	P-P	Med City FC (NPSL)	Urbandale, Iowa
				Stadium: Lions Field at Des Moines Christian School

TBD	Denton Diablos FC (NPSL)	P-P	NTX Rayados (LQ)	Denton, Texas
				Stadium: University of North Texas Soccer Stadium

TBD	FC Boulder Harpos (LQ)	P-P	Crossfire Redmond (NPSL)	Denver, Colorado
				Stadium: Regency Athletic Complex at MSU Denver

TBD	FC Golden State Force (USL2)	P-P	FC Arizona (NPSL)	Whittier, California
				Stadium: Rio Hondo Stadium

TBD	Olympic Club (LQ)	P-P	FC Davis (NPSL)	San Francisco, California
				Stadium: Negoesco Stadium

=== Second round ===
The second round was scheduled to take place on April 7–9 with 29 matches, a modern-era Open Cup record. 19 winners from the First Round will be joined by 6 teams from USL1, 8 from NISA, and 25 from USL Championship (USLC). Pairings were made geographically when possible and announced on January 29.

April 7	Pittsburgh Riverhounds SC (USLC)	v	West Chester United SC (NPSL) or Vereinigung Erzgebirge (LQ)	Pittsburgh, Pennsylvania
7:00 pm EDT				Stadium: Highmark Stadium

April 7	FC Motown (NPSL) or New York Pancyprian-Freedoms (LQ)	v	Saint Louis FC (USLC)	Montclair, New Jersey or Queens, New York
7:00pm EDT or 8:00 pm EDT				Stadium: MSU Soccer Park at Pittser Field or Belson Stadium

April 7	Charlotte Independence (USLC)	v	Stumptown Athletic (NISA)	Matthews, North Carolina
7:00 pm EDT				Stadium: Sportsplex at Matthews

April 7	Tampa Bay Rowdies (USLC)	v	The Villages SC (USL2) or South Georgia Tormenta FC 2 (USL2)	St. Petersburg, Florida
7:00 pm EDT				Stadium: Al Lang Stadium

April 7	North Carolina FC (USLC)	v	North Carolina Fusion U23 (USL2) or SC United Bantams (USL2)	Cary, North Carolina
7:00 pm EDT				Stadium: WakeMed Soccer Park

April 7	Chattanooga Red Wolves SC (USL1)	v	Birmingham Legion FC (USLC)	Chattanooga, Tennessee
7:00 pm EDT				Stadium: Chattanooga Christian School

April 7	Louisville City FC (USLC)	v	Nashville United (LQ) or Cleveland SC (NPSL)	Louisville, Kentucky
7:00 pm EDT				Stadium: Lynn Family Stadium

April 7	Greenville Triumph SC (USL1)	v	New Mexico United (USLC)	Greenville, South Carolina
7:30 pm EDT				Stadium: Legacy Early College Field

April 7	Los Angeles Force (NISA)	v	San Diego Loyal SC (USLC)	Los Angeles, California
7:30 pm PDT				Stadium: Jesse Owens Stadium (Cal State LA)

April 8	Richmond Kickers (USL1)	v	Virginia United FC (LQ) or Christos FC (LQ)	Richmond, Virginia
6:30 PM EDT				Stadium: City Stadium

April 8	Atlantic City FC (NPSL) or Austin Bold FC (USLC)	v	Austin Bold FC (USLC) or Newtown Pride FC (LQ)	Glassboro, New Jersey or Austin, Texas
7:00 pm EDT				Stadium: Rowan University Soccer Stadium or Bold Stadium

April 8	Charleston Battery (USLC)	v	South Georgia Tormenta FC (USL1)	Mount Pleasant, South Carolina
7:00 pm EDT				Stadium: Patriots Point Soccer Complex

April 8	Indy Eleven (USLC)	v	Michigan Stars FC (NISA)	Indianapolis, Indiana
7:00 pm EDT				Stadium: Carroll Stadium

April 8	Detroit City FC (NISA)	v	El Paso Locomotive FC (USLC)	Hamtramck, Michigan
7:00 pm EDT				Stadium: Keyworth Stadium

April 8	Louisiana Krewe FC (LQ) or Corpus Christi FC (USL2)	v	San Antonio FC (USLC)	Lafayette, Louisiana or Corpus Christi, Texas
6:30 or 7:00 pm CDT				Stadium: Ragin' Cajuns Soccer/Track Facility or Dugan Family Soccer and Track Stadium

April 8	Memphis 901 FC (USLC)	v	Chattanooga FC (NISA)	Memphis, Tennessee
7:00 pm CDT				Stadium: Mike Rose Soccer Complex

April 8	FC Tulsa (USLC)	v	Tulsa Athletic (NPSL) or Fort Worth Vaqueros (NPSL)	Tulsa, Oklahoma
7:00 pm CDT				Stadium: Hurricane Soccer and Track Stadium

April 8	Forward Madison FC (USL1)	v	Chicago FC United (USL2) or Minneapolis City SC (NPSL)	Madison, Wisconsin
7:00 pm CDT				Stadium: Breese Stevens Field

April 8	FC Boulder Harpos (LQ) or Colorado Springs Switchbacks FC (USLC)	v	Colorado Springs Switchbacks FC (USLC) or Crossfire Redmond (NPSL)	Denver, Colorado or Colorado Springs, Colorado
7:00 pm MDT				Stadium: Regency Athletic Complex at MSU Denver or Weidner Field

April 8	Phoenix Rising FC (USLC)	v	FC Golden State Force (USL2) or FC Arizona (NPSL)	Tempe, Arizona
7:30 pm MST				Stadium: Casino Arizona Field

April 8	Sacramento Republic FC (USLC)	v	Oakland Roots SC (NISA)	Sacramento, California
7:30 pm PDT				Stadium: Papa Murphy's Park

April 8	Orange County SC (USLC)	v	California United Strikers FC (NISA)	Irvine, California
7:30 pm PDT				Stadium: Championship Soccer Stadium

April 8	Olympic Club (LQ) or FC Davis (NPSL)	v	Reno 1868 FC (USLC)	San Francisco, California or Davis, California
7:30 pm PDT				Stadium: Negoesco Stadium or Ron and Mary Brown Stadium at Davis Senior High School

April 9	Hartford Athletic (USLC)	v	Western Mass Pioneers (USL2) or GPS Portland Phoenix (USL2)	Hartford, Connecticut
7:00 pm EDT				Stadium: Dillon Stadium

April 9	Union Omaha (USL1)	v	Des Moines Menace (USL2) or Med City FC (NPSL)	Omaha, Nebraska
7:00 pm CDT				Stadium: Al F. Caniglia Field

April 9	Las Vegas Lights FC (USLC)	v	Cal FC (LQ) or Ventura County Fusion (USL2)	Las Vegas, Nevada
7:30 pm PDT				Stadium: Cashman Field

TBD	Miami United FC U23 (LQ) or Miami FC (USLC)	v	Miami FC (USLC) or Naples United FC (NPSL)	Hialeah, Florida or Miami, Florida
				Stadium: Ted Hendricks Stadium or Riccardo Silva Stadium

TBD	Denton Diablos FC (NPSL) or NTX Rayados (LQ)	v	OKC Energy FC (USLC)	Denton, Texas or TBD
				Stadium: University of North Texas Soccer Stadium or TBD

TBD	San Diego 1904 FC (NISA)	v	ASC San Diego (NPSL) or Chula Vista FC (LQ)	San Diego, California
				Stadium: Lincoln High School

=== Third round ===
The third round draw was to be conducted on April 10, with 20 matches planned to be played on April 21–23. 29 winners from the Second Round will be joined by the 11 lower-ranked American MLS teams in the 2019 season's final standings.

v

=== Round of 32 ===
The round of 32 draw was to be conducted on April 24, with 16 matches to be played on May 19–20. 20 winners from the Third Round would join the 12 higher-ranked MLS teams.

v

=== Round of 16 and beyond ===
The draw for the round of 16 and quarterfinals was to be conducted on May 21. Beginning with the Round of 16, match dates would have been flexibly scheduled as follows:

- June 10: Possible Round of 16
- June 23–24: Possible Round of 16 or Quarterfinals
- July 14–15: Quarterfinals or Semifinals
- August 11–12: Semifinals or Final
- September 22–24: Possible Final

== Broadcasting ==
All matches from the first round to the final were to be streamed on ESPN+. This is the second year of a four-year agreement between U.S. Soccer and ESPN to air the tournament.
