= 2022 U.S. Open Cup qualification =

2022 Lamar Hunt U.S. Open Cup qualification
Tournament details
- Country: United States
- Dates: September 18,2021 – December 19,2021
- Teams: 91
- Qualified: D'Feeters Kicks Soccer Club (RL); Azteca FC (Colo SL); Lynchburg FC (UPSL); Brockton FC United (BSSL); Northern Virginia FC (EPSL); Oyster Bay United FC (UPSL); Escondido FC (UPSL); San Fernando Valley FC (UPSL); Contra Costa FC (NPSL); Orlando FC Wolves (NSL); City Soccer FC (NSL)

Tournament statistics
- Matches played: 80
- Goals scored: 311 (3.89 per match)

The 2022 Lamar Hunt U.S. Open Cup tournament proper featured both professional and amateur teams from the United States.

Qualification for the 2022 tournament included local qualifying matches contested by 90 amateur teams scheduled in 2021. One amateur team also qualified by winning the 2021 National Amateur Cup, and other clubs playing in national leagues that are not fully professional qualify based on their results in 2021 league play. Clubs playing in fully professional leagues may enter the tournament proper and bypass the qualification process.

== Qualification procedures ==
The United States Soccer Federation's (U.S. Soccer) Open Cup Committee manages both the tournament proper and the local qualification process.

Clubs based in the United States that play in a league that is an organization member of U.S. Soccer are generally eligible to compete for the U.S. Open Cup, if their league includes at least four teams and has a schedule of at least 10 matches for each club.

U.S.-based teams in Division I, II and III professional leagues qualify for the U.S. Open Cup automatically, provided they are eligible. To be eligible, these teams must be members in good standing of their leagues on December 31, 2021, and remain so through the 2022 U.S. Open Cup Final. The league must also remain in operation through the 2022 U.S. Open Cup Final. A new Division I, II or III professional league must have its match schedule announced to the public by January 31, 2022, and the first match must be scheduled for no later than seven days before the first scheduled round of the U.S. Open Cup tournament proper that involves the team's division. If a new club joins an existing Division I, II or III league, the league must meet the aforementioned criteria applicable to new leagues in order for the new club to be eligible for the U.S. Open Cup.

A professional team that is majority owned by a higher-level professional team or whose player roster is materially managed by a higher-level professional team is ineligible to participate in the U.S. Open Cup.

Clubs that are below Division III are Open Division teams. To be eligible for the 2022 U.S. Open Cup, an Open Division team must have been a playing member in good standing of its league on August 31, 2021, and remain so through the 2022 U.S. Open Cup Final. The league must have been in operation since no later than August 31, 2021, and remain so until the 2022 U.S. Open Cup Final. A team that started its first season of competition in an existing league must have started its new league's schedule no later than August 31, 2021.

Starting in 2019, the winner of the previous year's National Amateur Cup automatically qualifies for the U.S. Open Cup. The cup winner enters the tournament proper in the first round with the other Open Division clubs.

National leagues may elect to use the results of their previous year's seasons to determine which of their teams qualify for the U.S. Open Cup in lieu of having their teams play local qualifying matches. If a national league so elects, its teams are not eligible to participate in local qualifying. To qualify as a national league, the league must

- Have a minimum of 50 active U.S.-based teams in good standing,
- Have a common championship each season that is only available to league teams and is compulsory,
- Use a league format with a standings table as opposed to a single-elimination (knockout) format,
- Have teams in at least three U.S. time zones among Eastern, Central, Mountain and Pacific, with the three time zones containing the most teams each having at least 15% of the member teams,
- Have two time zones represented by at least three different U.S. states or the District of Columbia and a third time zone represented by at least two different U.S. states or the District of Columbia,
- Have teams in at least 10 different U.S. states or the District of Columbia,
- Have played for at least three years meeting the above criteria and
- Timely pay the team-based Open Cup entry fee for all teams in the league.

Eligible Open Division clubs that did not win the National Amateur Cup and are not members of national leagues must have submitted an application to enter local qualifying by August 09, 2021.

Once applications for local qualifying are approved, U.S. Soccer estimates the number of Open Division teams needed in the U.S. Open Cup, based on the anticipated participation of professional teams. One of these slots is allocated to the National Amateur Cup champions. The remainder are allocated among the pool of local qualification teams and the national leagues, based on the relative number of teams in each, resulting in a target number of local qualifiers. The number of rounds of local qualifying and the number of teams receiving byes in the first round of qualifying are then established to set the number of local qualifiers as close as possible to the target number. Byes are distributed randomly and are meant to avoid unnecessary travel but are kept to a minimum to preserve the integrity of the qualification tournament. Once the qualification tournament format has been finalized, the number of local qualifiers becomes fixed, unless a team that qualifies later becomes ineligible. After the December 31, 2021, professional clubs entry application deadline, the final number of Open Division teams needed in the 2022 U.S. Open Cup will become known. From this number, the fixed number of local qualifiers plus one for the National Amateur Cup champion are subtracted to determine the number of slots for clubs from the national leagues. These slots are allocated among the leagues based on their relative numbers of U.S.-based eligible teams.

== National Amateur Cup ==
Lansdowne Yonkers FC defeated Cal FC, 2–1, to win the 2021 National Amateur Cup and qualify for the 2022 U.S. Open Cup. The eleven winners of the fourth round of local qualifying will join them as the twelve Open Division teams in the tournament proper.

== Local qualifying ==
U.S. Soccer originally announced that 92 teams would participate in local qualifying. Four rounds of local qualifying matches resulted in 11 clubs advancing to the tournament proper.

=== First qualifying round ===
The first qualifying-round matches were scheduled to be played on September 18. All East and Central Region Teams, 14 Southeast Region and 22 West Region teams were given byes into the second qualifying round One game was delayed due to bad weather and was instead played on September 24.

==== West Region ====
September 18	Davis Legacy FC (UPSL) (California)	3–4	(California) FC Davis (NPSL)	Davis, California
7:00 PM PDT	Padilla 50'; Manzoni 88'; Grant 90'	Report	Power 47' (pen.); Negrete 75'; Aldetimi 76'; Shikashio (1st OT)	Stadium: Davis Legacy Soccer Complex

September 18	Rebels SC (UPSL) (California)	7–1	(California) Gremio FC San Diego (UPSL)	San Diego, California
7:00 PM PDT		Report		Stadium: Mira Mesa High School Stadium

==== Southeast Region ====
September 24	Deportivo Lake Mary FC (UPSL) (Florida)	0–4	(Florida) Orlando FC Wolves (NSL)	Christmas, Florida
		Report	Serrano 23'; Dar. Rios 29'; Lopez 77'; O'Sullivan 84'	Stadium: East Orange District Park

=== Second qualifying round ===
The second qualifying round was played on multiple weekends. The East and Central Region played between September 12th and October 1st. The West And Southeast region was played between October 16th and October 24th. The game between Modesto City FC and Contra Costa FC was postponed until Oct 31 due to poor field conditions.

==== Central Region ====
September 12	Peak Eleven SC (Colo SL) (Colorado)	0–0 (a.e.t.) (4–3 p)	(Colorado) FC Denver (Colo SL)	Denver, Colorado
	Rys (pen.); Henry (pen.); Badawi (pen.); Veiga (pen.)	Report	Castillo (pen.); Schmidt (pen.); Bernhardt (pen.)	Stadium: Northfield High School

September 15	FC Union Jereza (Colo SL) (Colorado)	0–1	(Colorado) Harpos FC (Colo SL)	Commerce City, Colorado
		Report	Straton 39'	Stadium: Dicks Sporting Goods Park, Field 11

September 18	D'Feeters Kick SC (RL) (Texas)	W–L (forfeit)	(Texas) Lone Star Republic (DSA)	Dallas, Texas
		Report		Stadium: Crum Lacrosse and Sport Field

September 18	San Antonio Runners (NSL) (Texas)	1–6	(Texas) Southwest Football Club (UPSL)	El Paso, Texas
		Report		Stadium: Eastside Sports Complex

September 19	Athletic Club of Sloan's Lake (Colo SL) (Colorado)	1–2	Colorado Rovers (CPL)	Golden, Colorado
		Report		Stadium: Victoria Sports Park

September 19	Athletic Katy FC (NSL) (Texas)	1–3	(Texas) Houston Hotshots - GPFC (NSL)	Katy, Texas
		Report		Stadium: British International School of Houston

September 19	Azteca FC (Colo SL) (Colorado)	4–1	(Colorado) Colorado Rush (Colo SL)	Arvada, Colorado
		Report		Stadium: Long Lake Regional Park, Field 3

September 19	Lexington Landsharks (OVPL) (Kentucky)	L–W (forfeit)	(Illinois) FC Maritsa (MEFA)	O'Fallon, Illinois
		Report		Stadium: O'Fallon Family Sports Park

==== Northeast Region ====
September 18	Ukrainian Nationals (USLPA) (Pennsylvania)	2–9	(Pennsylvania) Philadelphia Lone Star FC (UPSL)	Philadelphia, Pennsylvania
		Report		Stadium: John Bartram HS Football Field

September 18	IASC Boom (RDSL) (New York (state))	4–0	(Pennsylvania) Pittsburgh City United FC (UPSL)	Monroeville, Pennsylvania
		Report		Stadium: Monroeville Community Park West

September 18	NY Pancyprian-Freedoms (EPSL) (New York (state))	W–L (forfeit)	(New York (state)) New Amsterdam FC II (EPSL)	Warwick, New York
		Report		Stadium: Hudson Sports Complex

September 18	Alianza Futbol Club (WSL) (Washington, D.C.)	L–W (forfeit)	(Washington, D.C.) Districtonia Futbol (DCPL)	Washington, D.C.
		Report		Stadium: Riggs Lasalle Recreation Center

September 18	Corinto FC (WSL) (Washington, D.C.)	1–5	(Washington, D.C.) DC Cheddar (DCPL)	Washington, D.C.
		Report		Stadium: RFK Stadium Auxiliary Turf Field

September 18	Springfield FC (WSL) (Virginia)	0–2	Northern Virginia FC (EPSL)	Leesburg, Virginia
		Report		Stadium: Evergreen Sportsplex

September 19	Unations FC (UPSL) (Massachusetts)	3–5	(Massachusetts) Brockton FC United (BSSL)	Randolph, Massachusetts
		Report		Stadium: Randolph High School

September 19	Vereinigung Erzgebirge (USLPA) (Pennsylvania)	2–1	(Pennsylvania) United German Hungarians (USLPA)	Ambler, Pennsylvania
		Report		Stadium: Temple University Ambler Complex

September 19	Aegean Hawks FC (WPL) (Virginia)	L–W (forfeit)	(Virginia) Lynchburg FC (UPSL)	Lynchburg, Virginia
		Report		Stadium: Lynchburg City Stadium

September 19	New York Greek Americans (EPSL) (New York (state))	0–0 (a.e.t.) (2–3 p)	(New York (state)) Oyster Bay United FC (UPSL)	Rockville Center, New York
		Report		Stadium: Darcy Field

September 19	Rockville SC (MMSL) (Maryland)	2–1 (a.e.t.)	(Virginia) C.A. United (WSL)	Woodbridge, Virginia
		Report		Stadium: George Hampton Middle School

September 19	Westchester United FC (UPSL) (New York (state))	5–2	(New Jersey) New Jersey Alliance FC (UPSL)	Clifton, New Jersey
		Report		Stadium: Athenia Steel Recreation Complex

September 19	Virginia United FC (EPSL)	4–2 (a.e.t.)	(Virginia) Toros FC (WSL)	Woodbridge, Virginia
		Report		Stadium: Greg Hampton Middle School

September 25	Newtown Pride FC (Conn SL) (Connecticut)	0–1 (a.e.t.)	(Massachusetts) Kendall Wanderers (BSSL)	Waltham, Massachusetts
		Report		Stadium: James P Falzone Memorial Park

October 1	Jackson Lions FC (GSSL) (New Jersey)	3–0	(New Jersey) EFA Metro (UPSL)	Lyndhurst, New Jersey
		Report		Stadium: Lyndhurst Recreation Center

==== West Region ====
October 16	El Farolito (NPSL) (California)	7–0	(California) Oakland Stompers (NPSL)	San Leandro, California
		Report		Stadium: Burell Field

October 16	Metro FC (SFSFL) (California)	4–2	(California) JASA RWC (UPSL)	Redwood City, California
		Report		Stadium: Red Morton Community Park - Bechet Field

October 17	FC Davis (NPSL) (California)	2–4	(Nevada) BattleBorn FC (UPSL)	Minden, Nevada
		Report		Stadium: Douglass High School Grass Field

October 17	Villareal Las Vegas (UPSL) (Nevada)	0–1	(California) Desert Communities SC Pathfinders (UPSL)	Helendale, California
		Report		Stadium: Helendale Community Park

October 17	Outbreak FC (SWPL) (California)	4–0	(California) L.A. Monsters FC (SWPL)	Wilmington, California
		Report		Stadium: Wilmington Athletic Complex

October 17	White Tigers FC (UPSL) (California)	0–2	(California) Chula Vista FC (SWPL)	Chula Vista, California
		Report		Stadium: Terra Nova Park

October 17	Real San Jose (NSL) (California)	2–4	(California) Inter San Francisco (SFSFL)	San Francisco, California
		Report		Stadium: Beach Chalet Fields, Field 4

October 17	Rebels Soccer Club (UPSL) (California)	2–3	(California) Escondido FC (UPSL)	Spring Valley, California
		Report		Stadium: Mount Miguel High School

October 17	Rose City FC (UPSL) (Oregon)	0–6	(California) Sporting ID11 (UPSL)	Lake Forest, California
		Report		Stadium: Lake Forest Sports Park, Turf Field A

October 17	Trojans FC (UPSL) (California)	1–2	(California) San Fernando Valley FC (UPSL)	Encino, California
		Report		Stadium: Sepulveda Basin Sports Complex

October 17	Capistrano FC (SWPL) (California)	6–0	(California) Real Sociedad Royals (SWPL)	Irvine, California
		Report		Stadium: Orange County Great Park, Field 13

October 31	Modesto City FC (UPSL) (California)	1–3	(California) Contra Costa FC (NPSL)	Concord, California
		Report		Stadium: Mount Diablo High School

==== Southeast Region ====
September 18	Miami Sun FC (UPSL) (Florida)	2–3	(Florida) City Soccer FC (NSL)	West Palm Beach, Florida
		Report		Stadium: Gaines Park

September 18	Naples City FC (UPSL) (Florida)	1–2	(Florida) Miami Soccer Academy (NSL)	Miami Beach, Florida
		Report		Stadium: Flamingo Park, Abel Holtz Stadium

October 16	Miami Sun FC (UPSL) (Florida)	2–3	(Florida) City Soccer FC (NSL))	West Palm Beach, Florida
		Report		Stadium: Gaines Park

October 16	Georgia Storm FC (UPSL) (Georgia (U.S. state))	2–2 (a.e.t.) (2–4 p)	(Georgia (U.S. state)) Georgia Revolution FC Reserves (ADASL)	Locust Grove, Georgia
		Report		Stadium: Luella High School Stadium

October 16	Oceanway FC (UPSL) (Florida)	0–4	(Florida) Orlando FC Wolves (NSL)	Christmas, Florida
		Report		Stadium: East Orange District Park

October 17	Atletico Atlanta (UPSL) (Georgia (U.S. state))	1–3	South Carolina United Heat (UPSL)	Columbia, South Carolina
		Report		Stadium: Southeastern Freight Line Soccer Center

October 17	Red Force FC (NSL) (Florida)	3–3 (a.e.t.) (4–2 p)	(Florida) Florida Brothers (NSL)	Miami Gardens, Florida
		Report		Stadium: Dr. Lester Brown Park

October 17	International Soccer Academy (UPSL) (Florida)	4–0	(Florida) Palm Beach Breakers (NSL)	West Palm Beach, Florida
		Report		Stadium: Lake Lytal Park

October 17	Hurricane FC (NSL) (Florida)	2–3	Florida Soccer Soldiers (UPSL)	West Palm Beach, Florida
		Report		Stadium: Lake Lytal Park

=== Third qualifying round ===
The third qualifying round was played on multiple weekends. The Northeast and Central Region played October 16 and 17. The West And Southeast region was played on November 20 and 21.

==== Central Region ====
October 16	Colorado Rovers (CPL) (Colorado)	2–5	(Colorado) Azteca FC (Colo SL)	Commerce City, Colorado
		Report		Stadium: Dicks Sporting Goods Park, Field 10

October 16	Peak Eleven FC (Colo SL) (Colorado)	0–1	(Colorado) Harpos FC (Colo SL)	Commerce City, Colorado
		Report		Stadium: Dicks Sporting Goods Park, Field 8

October 16	Gam United FC (Colo SL) (Colorado)	1–7	(Texas) Southwest FC (UPSL)	El Paso, Texas
		Report		Stadium: Eastside Sports Complex

October 17	Houston Hotshots GPFC (NSL) (Texas)	1–2 (a.e.t.)	(Texas) D'Feeters Kick SC (RL)	Mansfield, Texas
		Report		Stadium: Lake Ridge High School

==== Northeast Region ====
October 16	Districtonia Futbol (WSL) (Washington, D.C.)	3–2 (a.e.t.)	(Washington, D.C.) DC Cheddar (DCPL)	Washington, D.C.
		Report		Stadium: The Field at RFK Campus, Field 3

October 16	Brockton FC United (BSSL) (Massachusetts)	7–0	(Massachusetts) Kendall Wanderers (BSSL)	Waltham, Massachusetts
		Report		Stadium: James P. Falzone Memorial Park

October 16	Jackson Lions FC (GSSL) (New York (state))	L–W (forfeit)	(New York (state)) Westchester United FC (UPSL)	Brewster, New York
		Report		Stadium: Brewster High School

October 16	NoVa FC (EPSL) (Virginia)	2–1	(Virginia) Virginia United FC (EPSL)	Woodbridge, Virginia
		Report		Stadium: George Hampton Middle School

October 17	Lynchburg FC (UPSL) (Virginia)	3–0	(Maryland) Rockville SC (MMSL)	Gaithersburg, Maryland
		Report		Stadium: Laytonia Recreiational Park - Turf Field

October 17	Vereinigung Erzgebirge (USLPA) (Pennsylvania)	1–2 (a.e.t.)	(Pennsylvania) Philadelphia Lone Star FC (UPSL)	Philadelphia, Pennsylvania
		Report		Stadium: John Bartram High School Football Field

October 17	FC Maritsa (MEFA) (Illinois)	1–1 (a.e.t.) (5–4 p)	(New York (state)) IASC Boom (RDSL)	East Rochester, New York
		Report		Stadium: East Rochester Public High School

October 17	Oyster Bay United FC (UPSL) (New York (state))	2–0 (a.e.t.)	(New York (state)) New York Pancyprian-Freedoms (EPSL)	Jamaica, New York
		Report		Stadium: Belson Stadium (St. John's University)

==== West Region ====
Nov 20	Capistrano FC (SWPL) (California)	3–2	(California) Outbreak FC (SWPL)	Long Beach, California
1:00 pm		Report		Stadium: George Allen Field, Cal State Long Beach

Nov 20	Contra Costa (NPSL) (California)	3–2	(California) El Farolito (NPSL)	San Francisco, California
3:00 pm		Report		Stadium: Boxer Stadium

Nov 20	Desert Communities SC Pathfinders (UPSL) (California)	L–W (forfeit)	(California) San Fernando Valley FC (UPSL)	Encino, California
3:30 pm		Report		Stadium: Sepulveda Basin Sports Park

Nov 21	Metro FC (SFSFL) (California)	1–0	(Nevada) BattleBorn FC (UPSL)	Minden, Nevada
4:00 pm		Report		Stadium: Douglass High School Grass Field

Nov 21	Inter San Francisco (SFSFL) (California)	1–3	(California) Sporting ID11 (UPSL)	Lake Forest, California
6:00 pm		Report		Stadium: Lake Forest Sports Park, Turf Field B

Nov 21	Chula Vista FC (SWPL) (California)	2–3 (a.e.t.)	(California) Escondido FC (UPSL)	San Marcos, California
9:00 pm		Report		Stadium: Minkoff Park (Palomar College)

==== Southeast Region ====
Nov 20	Miami Sports Academy (NSL) (Florida)	1–3	(Florida) Orlando FC Wolves (NSL)	Christmas, Florida
7:00 pm		Report		Stadium: East Orange District Park

Nov 20	South Carolina United Heat (UPSL)	3–2 (a.e.t.)	(Georgia (U.S. state)) Georgia Revolution FC Reserves (ADASL)	McDonough, Georgia
7:30 pm		Report		Stadium: Ola High School

Nov 20	Red Force FC (NSL) (Florida)	0–1	Florida Soccer Soldiers (UPSL)	Miami, Florida
8:00 pm		Report		Stadium: Tropical Park Stadium

Nov 21	City Soccer FC (NSL) (Florida)	7–2	(Florida) International Soccer Academy (UPSL)	Boca Raton, Florida
7:00 pm		Report		Stadium: South County Regional Park

=== Fourth qualifying round ===
The fourth qualifying round was played on multiple weekends. The Northeast and Central Region played November 20 and 21. The West And Southeast region was played on December 18 and 19. The eleven winners of this round will advance to the first round in March 2022.

==== Central Region ====
Nov 20	D'Feeters Kicks Soccer Club (RL) (Texas)	2–1	(Texas) Southwest Football Club (UPSL)	El Paso, Texas
9:00 pm		Report		Stadium: Eastside Sports Complex, Field 1

Nov 21	Harpos FC (Colo SL) (Colorado)	3–4 (a.e.t.)	(Colorado) Azteca FC (Colo SL)	Golden, Colorado
4:00 pm		Report		Stadium: Victoria Sports Park

==== Northeast Region ====
Nov 20	FC Maritsa (MEFA) (Illinois)	0–1	(Virginia) Lynchburg FC (UPSL)	Lynchburg, Virginia
5:00 pm		Report		Stadium: Lynchburg City Stadium

Nov 20	Brockton FC United (BSSL) (Massachusetts)	5–0	(Pennsylvania) Philadelphia Lone Star FC (UPSL)	Philadelphia, Pennsylvania
1:30 pm		Report		Stadium: John Bartram High School Football Field

Nov 21	Districtonia Futbol (DCPL) (Washington, D.C.)	0–5	Northern Virginia FC (EPSL)	Leesburg, Virginia
7:15 pm		Report		Stadium: Evergreen Sportsplex

Nov 21	Oyster Bay United FC (UPSL) (New York (state))	4–1	(Pennsylvania) Westchester United F.C. (UPSL)	Brewster, New York
5:00 pm		Report		Stadium: Brewster High School

==== West Region ====
Dec 13	Sporting ID11 (UPSL) (California)	1–3	(California) Escondido FC (UPSL)	Temecula, California
10:00 pm		Report		Stadium: Patricia H. Birdsall Sports Park (Field 3)

Dec 19	Capistrano FC (SWPL) (California)	1–2	(California) San Fernando Valley FC (UPSL)	Encino, California
2:30 pm		Report		Stadium: Sepulveda Basin Sports Park

Dec 19	Metro FC (SFSFL) (California)	1–1 (a.e.t.) (7–8 p)	(California) Contra Costa FC (NPSL)	Richmond, California
4:30 pm		Report		Stadium: Salesian College Prep Stadium

==== Southeast Region ====
Dec 18	South Carolina United Heat (UPSL) (South Carolina)	L–W (forfeit)	(Florida) Orlando FC Wolves (NSL)	Celebration, Florida
7:00 pm		Report		Stadium: Celebration High School

Dec 18	City Soccer FC (NSL) (Florida)	4–0	(Florida) Florida Soccer Soldiers (UPSL)	Pembroke Pines, Florida
7:30 pm		Report		Stadium: Broward College Soccer Field
