= Virginia United FC =

Virginia United FC may refer to:

- Virginia United FC (Australia), an Australian soccer team
- Virginia United FC (United States), an American soccer team

See also

- Northern Virginia United FC, an American soccer team
