= Georgi Hristov (footballer, born 1985) =

Bulgarian footballer

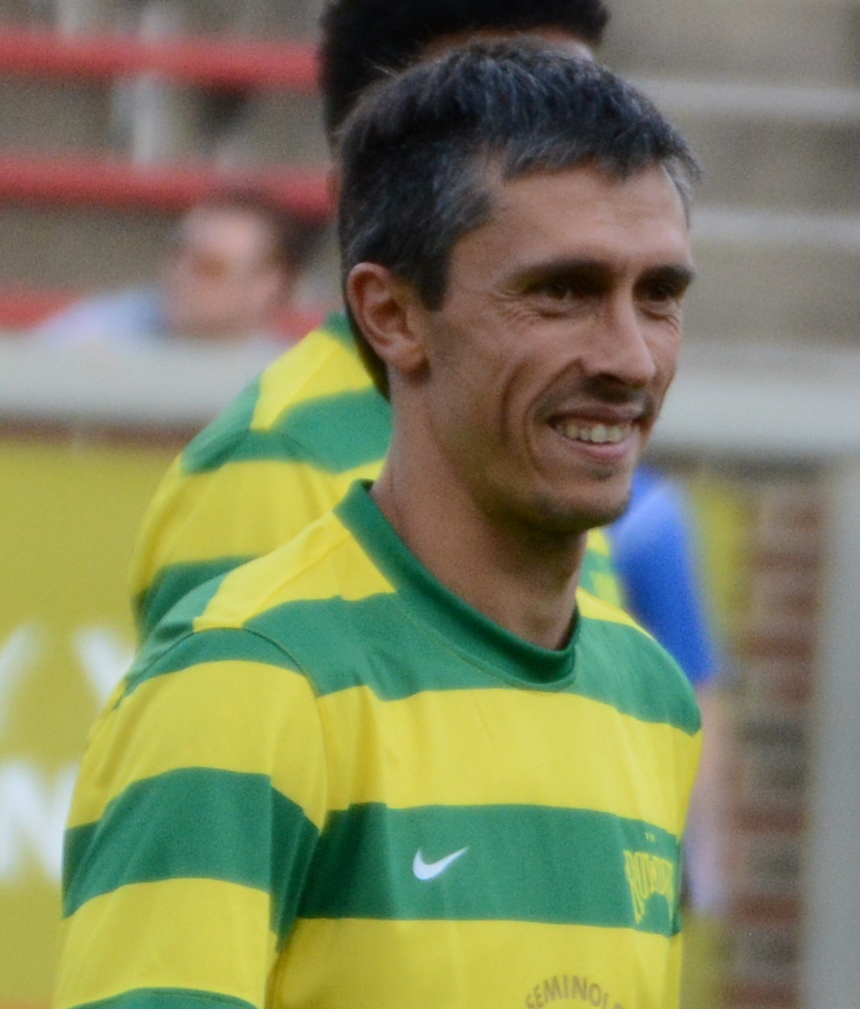
- Hristov with Tampa Bay Rowdies in 2017

Personal information
- Full name: Georgi Georgiev Hristov
- Date of birth: 10 January 1985 (age 41)
- Place of birth: Plovdiv, Bulgaria
- Height: 1.84 m (6 ft 0 in)
- Position: Striker

Youth career
- Maritsa Plovdiv

Senior career*
Years	Team	Apps	(Gls)
2002–2007	Maritsa Plovdiv	111	(51)
2007–2008	Botev Plovdiv	30	(19)
2008–2010	Levski Sofia	38	(12)
2010	→ Wisła Kraków (loan)	2	(0)
2010–2012	Slavia Sofia	35	(4)
2011	→ Ashdod (loan)	4	(0)
2012	Lokomotiv Sofia	13	(2)
2013–2018	Tampa Bay Rowdies	164	(60)
2019	Nashville United		
2021	Florida Premier		
Total		397	(148)
- * Club domestic league appearances and goals

Georgi Hristov (Bulgarian: Георги Христов; born 10 January 1985) is a Bulgarian former professional footballer who played as a striker.

== Career ==
=== Maritsa Plovdiv ===
Hristov was born in Plovdiv. He grew up as part of Maritsa Plovdiv's academy and made his debut for the senior team in 2002/2003 season. He played for Maritsa until 2007. During the 2005/2006 season he was B PFG's top scorer, with 18 goals. In the same season he was chosen the best footballer of B PFG East group by other players.

=== Botev Plovdiv ===
He signed a contract with Botev during summer of 2007. In his first season in A PFG he became a topscorer, scoring 19 goals and was chosen the best footballer of the season by other players. Hristov became a free-agent on 4 July 2008.

=== Levski Sofia ===
Hristov started training with Levski Sofia on 23 June 2008. Later, he signed his contract with 'the Blues'. He scored a hat-trick against his ex-team Botev, in one of his first matches for Levski. On 13 August 2008, Hristov earned a penalty for Levski Sofia in the first leg of a decisive Champions League match against BATE Borisov, but it was not converted and the "bluemen" subsequently lost the match by a score of 0:1. On 26 April 2009 Hristov scored four goals against PFC Belasitsa Petrich. He scored in 56th, 63rd, 65th and 86th minute. The result of the match was 1:7 with a guest win for Levski Sofia. On 9 May 2009 Hristov scored the first goal for Levski Sofia in The Eternal Derby against CSKA. The result of the match was 0:2 with a guest win for Levski. He became a Champion of Bulgaria in 2009.

On 15 July 2009, Hristov opened his goal account for the new season with two goals in the first official match for Levski during 2009/2010 season. The event took place in the 2nd Qualifying round of UEFA Champions League, where Levski beaten the team of UE Sant Julià. The result of the match was 4:0 with a home win for Levski. On 5 August 2009, he also scored against FK Baku to wrap up a 2:0 win for the team from Sofia. In the play-off round Levski was eliminated by Debreceni VSC with 4:1 (on aggregate). However, Levski qualified for UEFA Europa League. On 8 January 2009. the coach of Levski Georgi Ivanov, announced that he gave 'his' ex-kit-number 9 to Hristov.

=== Wisła Kraków ===
On 26 February 2010 Wisła Kraków signed the Bulgarian forward on loan from PFC Levski Sofia. On 7 June 2010 it was announced that Hristov's loan contract would be terminated and he would return to Levski, unlike the initial plans of Wisła having him on loan until December 2010.

=== Return to Bulgaria ===
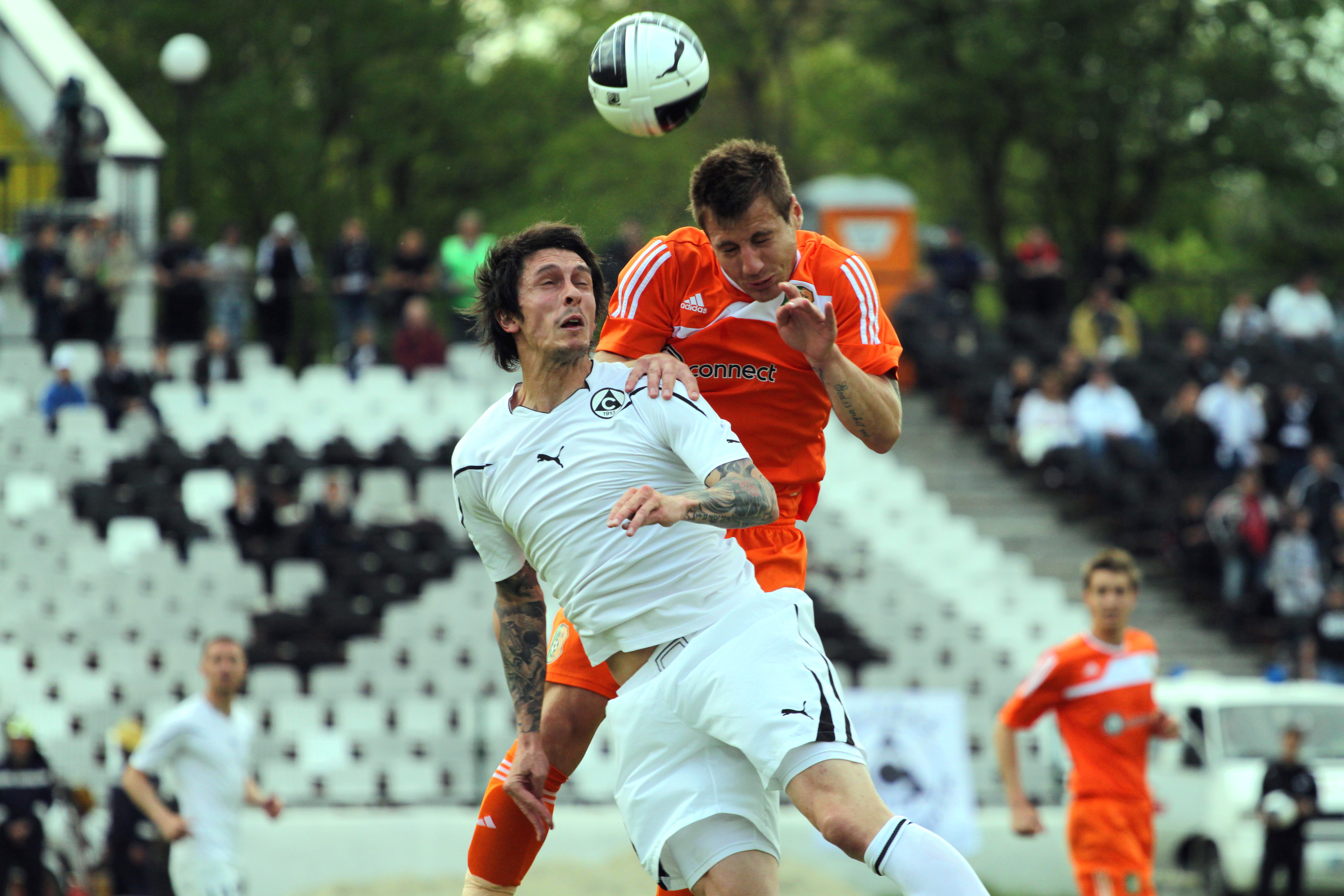
Hristov playing for Slavia in a match against Litex Lovech

On 31 August 2010, Hristov moved to PFC Slavia Sofia. In August 2012, he moved to another A PFG outfit PFC Lokomotiv Sofia. In February 2013, he trialed with Major League Soccer club Philadelphia Union.

=== Tampa Bay Rowdies ===
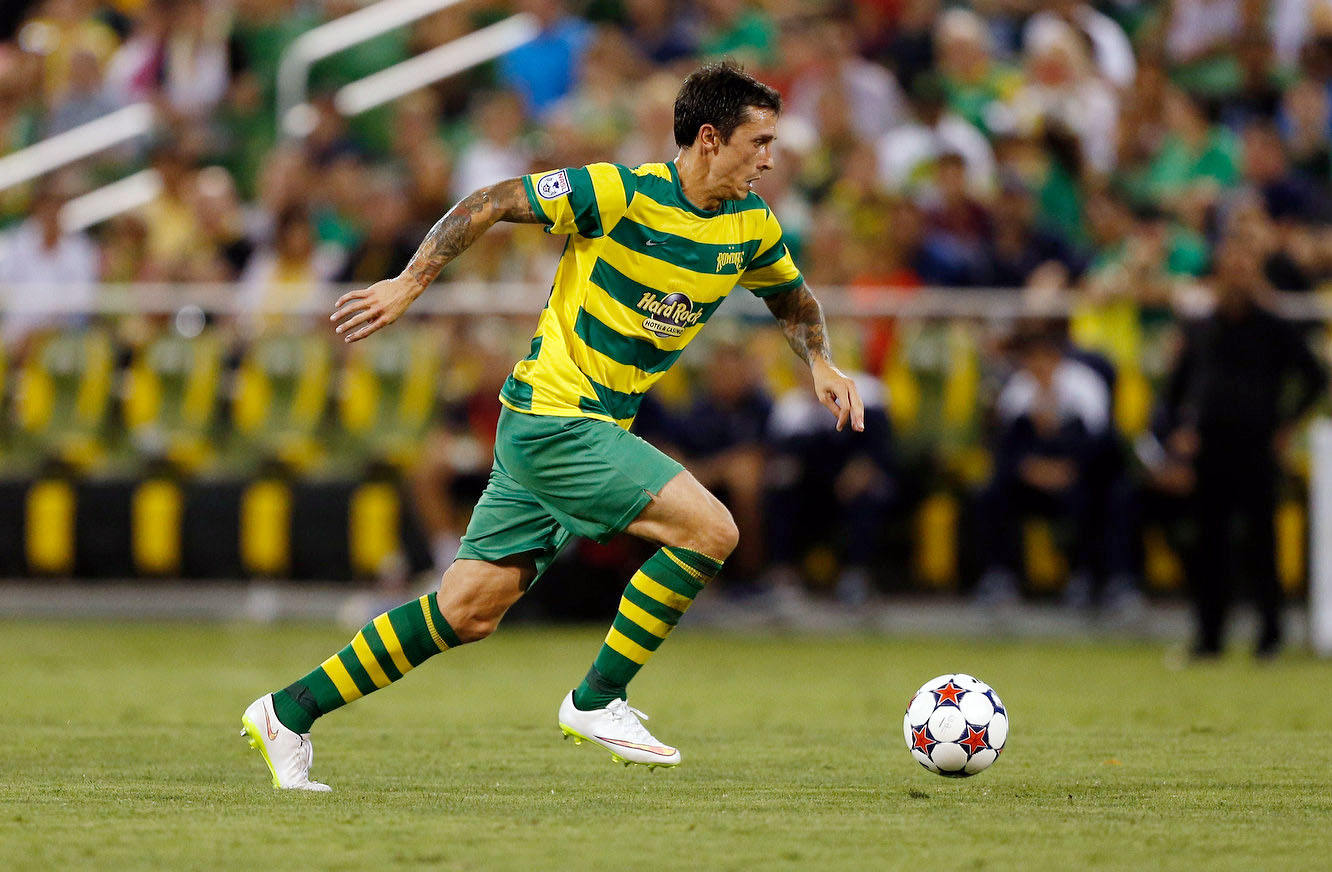
Hristov with the Tampa Bay Rowdies in 2015

On 8 March 2013, The Tampa Bay Rowdies, of the North American Soccer League, announced that the club had signed Hristov to a two-year deal. Year two of the contract is a club option. Hristov scored his first goal for the Rowdies in a 2–0 win against the San Antonio Scorpions. Hristov made 22 appearances during his first season in USA, finishing as the club's top scorer with 12 goals. He also made 8 assists. He won the MVP award of the league that year.

On 4 July 2018 Hristov scored his 58th career goal for the Rowdies, making him the Rowdies' all-time top scorer.

Since retiring from professional football, Hristov has featured for Nashville United during 2020 U.S. Open Cup qualification, and for South Tampa FC of the Florida Suncoast Soccer League, which is a Tampa Bay-area Sunday league.

== International career ==
Georgi Hristov was called up for one friendly match against Bosnia and Herzegovina in August 2008, but remained an unused substitute.

== Personal life ==
Hristov is an avid rock music fan, and cited the American thrash metal band Metallica as his favourite. His older brother Hristo was a guitarist in the rock band P.I.F.

== Statistics ==
(As of 22 May 2018)

Club	Season	League	League		National		Europe		Play-offs		Total	
Club	Season	League	Apps	Goals	Apps	Goals	Apps	Goals	Apps	Goals	Apps	Goals
Maritsa Plovdiv	2002–03	V AFG	17	4	—		—		—		17	4
Maritsa Plovdiv	2003–04	V AFG	21	7	—		—		—		21	7
Maritsa Plovdiv	2004–05	V AFG	26	10	—		—		—		26	10
Maritsa Plovdiv	2005–06	B Group	24	18	1	0	—		1	1	26	19
Maritsa Plovdiv	2006–07	B Group	23	12	2	2	—		—		25	14
Maritsa Plovdiv	Total		111	51	3	2	—		1	1	115	54
Botev Plovdiv	2007–08	A Group	30	19	4	3	—		–		34	22
Levski Sofia	2008–09	A Group	25	11	3	0	3	0	—		31	11
Levski Sofia	2009–10	A Group	12	1	3	1	10	3	—		25	5
Levski Sofia	2010–11	A Group	1	0	—		0	0	—		1	0
Levski Sofia	Total		38	12	6	1	13	3	—		57	16
Wisła Kraków (loan)	2009–10	Ekstraklasa	2	0	2	0	—		—		4	0
Slavia Sofia	2010–11	A Group	23	4	5	0	—		—		28	4
Slavia Sofia	2011–12	A Group	12	0	–		–		–		7	0
Slavia Sofia	Total		35	4	5	0	—		—		40	4
Ashdod (loan)	2011–12	Israeli Premier League	4	0	0	0	—		—		4	0
Lokomotiv Sofia	2012–13	A Group	13	2	3	1	—		—		16	3
Tampa Bay Rowdies	2013	NASL	22	12	2	3	—		—		24	15
Tampa Bay Rowdies	2014	NASL	25	9	—		–		—		25	9
Tampa Bay Rowdies	2015	NASL	28	2	1	0	—		—		29	2
Tampa Bay Rowdies	2016	NASL	31	11	2	1	—		—		33	12
Tampa Bay Rowdies	2017	NASL	32	15	2	0	—		—		34	15
Tampa Bay Rowdies	2018	NASL	10	4	1	0	—		—		11	4
Tampa Bay Rowdies	Total		147	53	11	5	—		—		158	58

== Honours ==
=== Levski ===
- A PFG: 2008–09
- Bulgarian Supercup: 2009

=== Individual ===
- B PFG Top Goalscorer: 2005–06
- A PFG Top Goalscorer: 2007–08
- B PFG "East" Footballer of the Season: 2005–06
- A PFG Footballer of the Season: 2007–08
- NASL Golden Ball: 2013
- NASL Best XI: 2013
- NASL Player of the Month – September 2013
