= Louisiana Krewe FC =

American soccer team

Louisiana Krewe
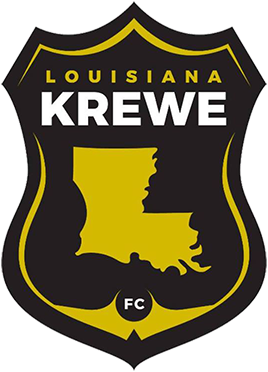
- Full name: Louisiana Krewe Football Club
- Nickname: The Krewe
- Founded: 2018; 8 years ago
- Ground: Ragin' Cajuns Soccer/Track Facility
- Capacity: 5,000
- Head Coach: Joan Oliva Peña
- League: USL League Two; Gulf Coast Premier League
- Website: lakrewefc.org
Home colors

Louisiana Krewe FC is an American soccer team based in Lafayette, Louisiana and competes within USL League Two. As members of the Gulf Coast Premier League, the team earned national attention when it qualified for the 2020 U.S. Open Cup in its first season of eligibility prior to the tournament's cancelation.

== History ==
Krewe FC was founded in late 2018 as an adult team extension of the Louisiana Dynamo Jrs youth organization in Lafayette. As an amateur affiliate of the Houston Dynamo of Major League Soccer, the club hopes to provide "Louisiana players exceptional playing and training opportunities" through the connection to professional soccer.

=== Gulf Coast Premier League (2019-2021) ===
Krewe FC finished their inaugural season in the Gulf Coast Premier League's Western Conference in second losing to Northshore United FC in the 2019 GCPL semifinal matchup.

On June 12th, 2019, Krewe FC played a friendly exhibition match in Lafayette against a team that included players of Houston Dynamo's U-23 squad and their USL League Two affiliate Brazos County Calvary. Krewe FC would repay this favor on November 13th, 2019 by playing an exhibition match with Houston Dynamo's U-23 Squad in Houston drawing 4-4.

The Krewe also won the inaugural Lafayette Mayor's Cup, a two-leg cup tie played against Cajun Soccer Club and considered by GCPL as a league match.

On August 21st, 2019, it was announced Krewe FC had qualified for the U.S. Open Cup, becoming 1 of only 3 teams from the state of Louisiana, and the first not based in New Orleans to ever qualify.

On July 20th, 2020 it was announced Krewe FC would compete in the inaugural NISA Independent Cup.

On December 16th, 2020 Krewe FC won the Gulf Coast Premier League Fall Showcase Tournament in their second full season as a club.

The Krewe won the 2nd annual Lafayette Mayor's Cup on June 30th, 2021 against the Cajun Rush.

On October 27, 2021, the Krewe were announced as a new expansion team in USL League Two.

== Current squad ==
As of 29 May 2026

Note: Flags indicate national team as defined under FIFA eligibility rules; some limited exceptions apply. Players may hold more than one non-FIFA nationality.

No.	Pos.	Nation	Player
2	DF	USA	Atticus Solis
3	DF	USA	Ty Nero
4	DF	ESP	Jesus Macaya
0	FW	USA	Italo Jenkins
8	MF	USA	Matheus Barrozo
16	MF	ESP	Gonzalo Carrasco
18	MF	ESP	Pol Mur
19	MF	USA	Axel Agurcia
20	MF	ENG	Phillip Mattap
23	DF	USA	Nathan Tanard
24	MF	USA	Mason Tichten

No.	Pos.	Nation	Player
—	GK	USA	Kenny Breaux
—	FW	ENG	Alex Gallas
—	FW	ENG	Sheldon Green
—	GK	FRA	Lucas Marsella
—	MF	COL	Santiago Echavarri

== Competitions ==
=== U.S. Open Cup ===
After reaching the GCPL semifinal in its first season, the team entered the 2020 U.S. Open Cup qualification tournament and defeated fellow league side Northshore United, 5–2, in the first round. Krewe then defeated Athletic Katy FC of the United Premier Soccer League in the second round, 3–2, off an 88th minute game-winner by forward Henrique Pimpao. In the final round of qualifying, the team defeated Michigan side Livonia City FC, 1–0, and became the second Open Division local team to qualify from the state of Louisiana (Motagua New Orleans qualified in 2016).

U.S. Soccer announced on January 22 that the Krewe would host USL League Two side Corpus Christi FC in the First Round on March 22. However, the tournament was later suspended and eventually cancelled due to the COVID-19 pandemic. The Krewe are to this day, undefeated in USOC play. https://thecup.us/2019/11/26/2020-us-open-cup-qualifying-win-youre-in-louisiana-krewe-edge-livonia-city-with-single-pk/

Despite tournament organizers announcing every qualified team from the 2020 tournament would be re-invited to the 2021 edition (so long as they stay eligible) only two open division teams were invited in this new format. In a random draw on April 7, 2021, the Krewe were not selected for the tournament (which was also eventually cancelled).

=== NISA Independent Cup ===
On July 1, 2020, the National Independent Soccer Association announced the NISA Independent Cup, a regionalized competition featuring its own members alongside independent professional and amateur clubs, with the Krewe taking part in the Central Plains Region. In the semifinal series against fellow GCPL member Gaffa FC, played at Holden Stadium on the campus of Pearl River Community College in Poplarville, Mississippi, the Krewe lost the first leg, 1–0, before coming from behind to tie the aggregate in the second leg, 3–2. In the penalty kick shootout, Gaffa advanced after ten rounds, 9–8.

On May 25, 2021, the second edition of the Independent Cup was announced with the Krewe once again taking part in the expanded field. The squad went undefeated in the South Central Region (2-1-0) and took home the title following a win over fellow GCPL side Alexandria PBFC.

== Year-by-year ==
=== USL League Two ===
Year	Regular season	W-D-L	Playoffs	U.S. Open Cup
2022	3rd, Mid South	6-4-4	did not qualify	Ineligible
2023	3rd, Mid South	6-1-5	did not qualify	did not qualify
2024	2nd, Mid South	6-2-4	did not qualify	did not qualify
2025	2nd, Mid South	8-1-3	Round of 16	did not qualify
2026	2nd, Mid South	7-1-4	did not qualify	did not qualify

=== Gulf Coast Premier League ===
Year	Regular season	W-D-L	Playoffs	U.S. Open Cup	Top Goal Scorer (Reg. Season)
2019	Second, Western Conference	6-2-2	Semifinal	Ineligible	Adrian Olivares Rodriguez (9)
2020	Season cancelled due to COVID-19 pandemic			First Round, Cancelled	N/A
2021	First, Western Conference	8-1-1	Champions	Eligible, Cancelled	Jonathan Quesi Weston (11)

== Honors ==
Gulf Coast Premier League

- GCPL Cup
  - Champion (1): 2021
- Western Conference
  - Champion (1): 2021
- Fall Tournament Showcase
  - Champion (1): 2020

NISA Independent Cup

- South Central Region
  - Champion (1): 2021
- Central Plains Region
  - Semifinalist (1): 2020

U.S. Open Cup

- Qualified: 2020
