= P.I.F. (band) =

Bulgarian rock band

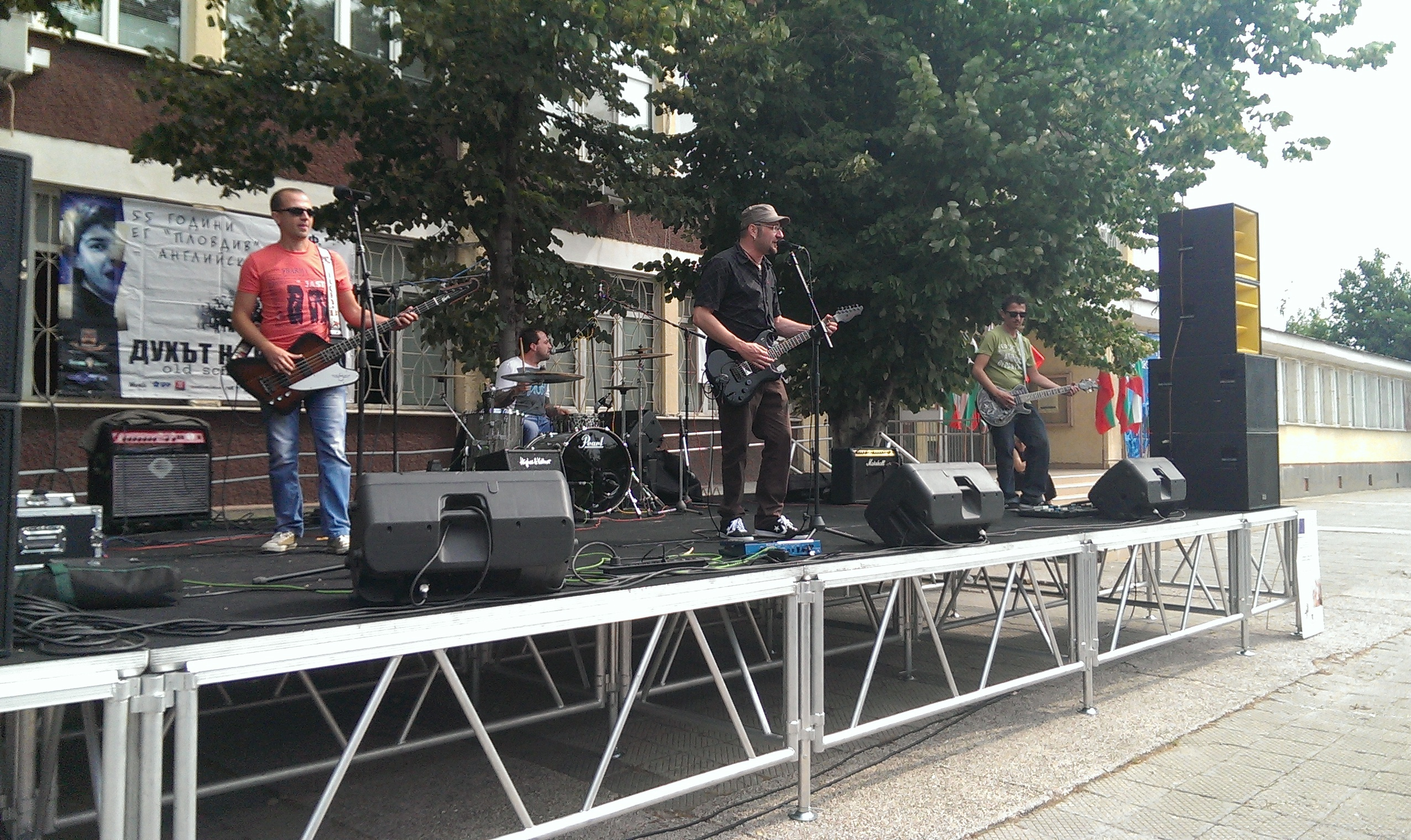
- P.I.F. live in Plovdiv.

Background information
- Origin: Sofia, Bulgaria
- Genres: Alternative rock, pop rock, post-grunge, punk rock
- Years active: 1992–present
- Label: Stars
- Members: Ivan Velkov; Yuri Bozhinov; Martin Profirov
- Past members: Dimo Stoyanov (deceased); Hristo Hristov; Martin Nikolov; Atanas Kasabov; Emilian Bonev; Zhelyaz Zhelezov; Lyubomir Petkov; Viktor Stambolov
- Website: www.pifbg.com

P.I.F. is a Bulgarian alternative rock band with lead singer Dimo Stoyanov, known as Dimo. During the 1990s, inspired by the grunge sound, Dimo and Ivan (guitarist), the core of band, founded Resemblance with musicians from a previous group called Crowfish. In 1992, they had already created around 40 records in English. They even lived in Hungary and held performances there for a month. After that period, they decided to return to Bulgaria and try singing in their mother language. They moved to the capital Sofia, and Resemblance fell apart. Pavlin Bachvarov (pianist), Valeri Cenkov (drummer), and Emilian Bonev (bassist) joined Dimo and Ivan to form P.I.F.

Dimo Stoyanov died of COVID-19 on December 21, 2020 at the age of 45.

== Patriots in Fashion ==
In 2000, their first album P.I.F. (Patriots in Fashion) is released. The song called Prikazka (in Bulgarian "Приказка") became an unprecedented hit. From that point they grew popularity and a number of songs from this album such as Kolelo ("Колело"), Vali ("Вали"), Patuvane ("Пътуване"), Nevidimo Dete ("Невидимо Дете"), Kambanite ("Камбаните") became very recognizable to the growing number of fans and the general public. Each song has its own history, which is regularly shared with the audience by the frontman, Dimo, during their live performances. Patriots In Fashion won an award for Best Album of the Year the same year it was released.

== Pictures in Frames ==
Their second album is called P.I.F. (Pictures in Frames), and it was released in 2001. In an interview, the band said they have separated themselves from the hustle-bustle in Sofia for several weeks in a villa in the Rila Mountain; this explained why its sound is a bit out-of-time-out-of-space. With their unique ways of creating music, the group continued gaining popularity. However, Dimo shared that the album was created in a very difficult period for the band, as at that time he was divorcing from his wife, and pianist Liubo was leaving the band. That time was recorded a song called Obarkvacia ("Обърквация") and the music video was shot. It showed vocalist and guitarist of the band kidding in a room with sofa. During the chorus appeared a little girl and two persons with "fish" and "elephant" heads. The song mixed elements of blues rock, punk rock and reggae. The song was not included in the album because the musicians said that it represented the confusion and chaos of the time it was composed.

== Passion in Fact ==
In 2004, after a tour around Europe, P.I.F. stabilized and enlarged into six members. Guitarist Hristo Hristov, bassist Martin Nikolov, and drummer Atanas Kasabov joined the group. They made their tour in December and destinations included Paris, Cologne, Bochum, Karlsruhe, Viens and others. In 2006, a new album was released: P.I.F. (Passion in Fact).

== Album listing ==
=== Patriots in Fashion (2000) ===
1. Приказка (Prikazka, "A Fairy Tale")
2. Пътуване (Patuvane, "Journey")
3. Вали (Vali, "It Rains")
4. Колело (Kolelo, "Bicycle")
5. Сам (Sam, "Alone")
6. Камбаните (Kambanite, "The Bells")
7. Песен (Pesen, "Song")
8. Невидимо дете (Nevidimo dete, "Invisible Child")
9. Горим (Gorim, "We Burn")
10. Събота вечер (Sabota vecher, "Saturday Evening")
11. Весели хора (Veseli hora, "Joyful People")
12. Колибри в цвете спи (Kolibri v cvete spi, "Hummingbird in a Flower Bed")
13. Акзакирп (Akzakirp, a reverse for "A Fairy Tale")

=== Pictures in Frames (2002) ===
1. Мечта (Mechta, "A dream")
2. Ти не знаеш (Ti ne znaesh, "You Don't Know")
3. Цялото небе (Cyaloto nebe, "The Whole Sky")
4. Не боли (Ne boli, "It Doesn't Hurt")
5. Нощта на слънчогледа (Noshtta na slanchogleda, "The Night of the Sunflower")
6. Букет цветя (Buket cvetya, "Bunch of Flowers")
7. Отлъчен (Otlachen, "Excommunicated")
8. Там назад (Tam nazad, "There, before")
9. Не знам (Ne znam, "I Don't Know")
10. Нова вяра (Nova vyara, "New Faith")
11. Рисуваш в мен (Risuvash v men, "You Paint Inside of Me")
12. Есен (Esen, "Autumn")
13. Сезоните говорят (Sezonite govoryat, "The Seasons Speak")
14. Той (Toy, "He")

=== Passion in Fact (2006) ===
1. Кой си ти? (Koi si ti?, "Who Are You?")
2. Лебед (Lebed, "Swan")
3. Времето внезапно спря (Vremeto vnezapno sprya, "The Time Suddenly Stopped")
4. Спомен (Spomen, "A Memory")
5. Всеки ден, a cappella (Vseki den, "Every Day")
6. Ноемврийски ден (Noemvriiski den, "November Day")
7. Всеки ден, radio edition (Vseki den, "Every Day")
8. Ти (Ti, "You")
9. Свято (Svyato, "Holyness")
10. No name

=== "P.I.F. 4" (2013) ===
1. Молещи очи ("Moleshti ochi", "Pleading Eyes")
2. Обещавам ("Obeshtavam", "I Promise")
3. Не спя ("Ne spq", "Sleepless")
4. Messiah ("Messiah", "Messiah")
5. Усмивка ("Usmivka", "Smile")
6. Куку-Руку ("Kuku-ruku", "Cooko-Rooko")
7. Намерих те ("Namerih te", "I Found You")
8. Седем ("Sedem", "Seven")
9. Нарисувай ми песен ("Narisuvai Mi Pesen", "Draw Me A Song")
10. О.К. ("O.K.", O.K.)
11. Рай ("Rai", "Heaven")
12. Оставам тук ("Оstavam Tuk", "I Stay Here")
13. Сладката страна нещата ("Sladkata strana na neshtata", "The Sweet Side of Things")
14. Сън в Съня ("Sun v Sunq", "Dream Within a Dream"),
15. Тоз ден ("Toz den", "This day")
16. Въпрос на време ("Vapros na Vreme", "Matter of Time")
17. Свободен от теб ("Svoboden ot teb", "Free From You")
18. Ти ("Ti", "You")

=== "P.I.F. 5" (2016) ===
1. Супернова ("Supernova", "Supernova")
2. Дихание ("Dihanie", "Exhalation")
3. Юг ("Yug", "South")
4. Дуел ("Duel", "Duel")
5. Балерина ("Balerina", "Ballerina")
6. Чуй ме ("Chui me", "Hear Me")
7. Сребърна ("Srebarna", "Silver")
8. Огън ("Ogan", "Fire")
9. Луна ("Luna", "Moon")
10. Утопия ("Utopiq", "Utopia")
11. Юли ("Uli", "July")
12. Този ден ("Tozi den", "This day")

=== "P.I.F. 6" (2021) ===
1. Опус 1 ("Opus 1", "Opus 1")
2. Опус 2 ("Opus 2", "Opus 2")
3. Опус 3 ("Opus 3", "Opus 3")
4. Опус 4 ("Opus 4", "Opus 4")
5. Опус 5 ("Opus 5", "Opus 5")
6. Опус 6 ("Opus 6", "Opus 6")
7. Приятел ("Priqtel", "Friend")
8. O ("O", "O")
9. Понякога ("Ponqkoga", "Sometimes")

=== "Best of: Slanchevo (Compilation)" (2021) ===
1. Колело ("Kolelo", "Bicycle")
2. Приятел ("Priqtel", "Friend")
3. Цялото небе ("Cqloto Nebe", "The Whole Sky")
4. Юли ("Iuly", "July")
5. Седем ("Sedem", "Seven")
6. Огън ("Ogan", "Fire")
7. О ("О", "О")
8. Вали ("Vali", "It Rains")
9. Нарисувай ми песен ("Narisuvai mi Pesen", "Draw Me A Song"
10. Куку-Руку ("Kuku-ruku", "Cooko-Rooko")
11. Пътуване ("Patuvane", "Journey")
12. Усмивка ("Usmivka", "Smile")
13. Мечта ("Mechta", "Dream")
14. Този ден ("Tozi den", "This day")

=== "Best of: Oblachno (Compilation)" (2021) ===
1. Приказка ("Prikazka", "Fairy Tale")
2. Камбаните ("Kambanite", "The Bells)
3. Невидимо дете ("Nevidimo dete", "Invisible Child")
4. Оставам тук ("Ostavam tuk", "I Stay Here")
5. Обещавам ("Obeshtavam", "I Promise")
6. Лебед ("Lebed", "Swan")
7. Сладката страна на нещата ("Sladkata strana na neshtata", "The Sweet Side of Things")
8. Свободен от теб ("Svoboden ot teb", "Free From You")
9. Дуел ("Duel", "Duel")
10. Отлъчен ("Otlachen", "Excommunicated")
11. Сън в съня ("Sun v sunq", "Dream Within A Dream")
12. Всеки ден ("Vseki den", "Every Day")
13. Песен ("Pesen", "Song")
14. Сам ("Sam", "Alone")
15. Времето внезапно спря ("Vremeto vnezapno sprq", "The Time Suddenly Stopped")
16. Свято ("Svqto", "Holyness")

== Non-album songs ==
1. Obarkvatzia ("Confusion")
2. "Svqta Nosht" ("Holy night")
