= Nashville United =

- Full name: Nashville United
- Founded: 2020; 6 years ago
- Stadium: Richard Siegel Park Stadium; Murfreesboro, Tennessee
- President: Brandon Whitsett
- Head Coach: Alan O'Connor
- League: National Premier Soccer League
- Website: https://www.thenashvilleunited.com/

Nashville United is an American soccer club based in Nashville, Tennessee. The team competes in the Southeast Conference of the National Premier Soccer League (NPSL), generally considered to be the fourth tier of the United States soccer league system.

== History ==
Nashville United Soccer Academy was originally founded during the 1970s and based out of Nashville, Tennessee. The organization fielded a variety of different teams in different age groups for children, women, and men. Over time the team won a variety of different championships and awards at various levels, including the Gerhard Mengel Over-30 Cup (United States Adult Soccer Association national championship) in 2018.

On March 19, 2020, Nashville United officially joined the National Premier Soccer League as one of the next teams to be competing in the league's Southeast Conference. The team was set to host fellow expansion side LSA Athletico Lanier for its first game on Saturday, May 2, however the league officially cancelled the 2020 season on March 26 due to the COVID-19 pandemic.

== U.S. Open Cup ==
In 2019 and prior to joining the NPSL, Nashville United's fully amateur squad, competing in the Middle Tennessee Soccer Alliance, entered the qualification tournament for the 2020 U.S. Open Cup. After receiving a bye in the first round, United defeated United Premier Soccer League side Springfield FC, 8–0. In the Third Round and on the road for a second game, the team beat Soda City FC Sorinex, 4–0, and qualified for its first ever U.S. Open Cup. Forward and former Tampa Bay Rowdies star Georgi Hristov led the team in goals (4) and finished in the top ten for most scored during qualifying.

Nashville was set to host 2019 NPSL National Semifinalist Cleveland SC in the First Round of the tournament proper on March 25, however the tournament was postponed due to the coronavirus pandemic.
