= Vereinigung Erzgebirge =

- Full name: Vereinigung Erzgebirge
- Short name: VE Club
- Founded: 1931; 95 years ago
- Ground: Vereinigung Erzgebirge Clubhouse
- Head Coach: Rob Oldfield
- League: American Premier Soccer League (2026-27)
- Website: http://veclub.org/

The Vereinigung Erzgebirge (English: Ore Mountain Association) is a social and soccer team based in Warminster, Pennsylvania that currently competes in the American Premier Soccer League, an amateur league recognized by USASA The club was founded by German American immigrants from the Ore Mountain region of eastern Germany in 1931 and is now home to many of their descendants.

== History ==
Vereinigung Erzgebirge began in 1931 as a social club founded by German immigrants from the Erzgebirge region. Early club members purchased land in Warminster, Pennsylvania, where they planted trees, built cabins, a cantina and later a clubhouse, creating a retreat for families and a base for sporting activity. Soccer was played from the outset, with the team’s first recorded match in the early 1930s against Saxonia SC of Paterson, New Jersey, before joining the North Philadelphia League. The club’s reputation grew over the following decades and in 1959 Vereinigung Erzgebirge became a founding member of the United Soccer League of Pennsylvania alongside 19 other clubs. By the early 1960s prominent American players such as Walter Bahr and Alex Ely had appeared for the team.

The grounds developed steadily, expanding into a large multi-purpose facility with a clubhouse, beer garden and sports fields. After the Berlin Wall fell in 1989, the club received a large concrete section of the Wall from Lufthansa, which remains displayed on the property. By the 1970s, VE fielded 11 teams, a number that grew to two dozen in the early twenty-first century.

The late 1990s and early 2000s marked a period of competitive strength. VE reached the 1997 National Amateur Cup Final Four in Portland and won multiple Eastern Pennsylvania honours, including the Amateur Cup and the Werner Fricker Open Cup. The club made its first appearance in the Lamar Hunt U.S. Open Cup in 1991, returning in 2002, 2020 and 2024. Its 2002 berth, led by player turned coach Rob Oldfield, ended in a First Round defeat to the South Jersey Barons.

In 2024, the club qualified again by defeating New Jersey Alliance FC in the fourth qualifying round of the 2024 U.S. Open Cup qualification. The match finished 0-0 after full time, and VE advanced 4-2 on penalties. The side then exited in the First Round against Charlotte Independence.

== Year-by-year ==
Year	Division	League	Regular season	Playoffs	Open Cup
1991	5	USLPA			Regional semifinals
2002	5	USLPA			1st Round
2020	5	USLPA			Qualified (tournament cancelled)
2021	5	USLPA	2nd		Qualified (tournament cancelled)
2022	5	USLPA	1st		3rd Qualifying Round
2023	5	USLPA	2nd		3rd Qualifying Round
2024	5	USLPA	2nd		First Round
2025	5	USLPA	2nd		4th Qualifying Round
2026	5	USLPA			3rd Qualifying Round
