= Harpos FC =

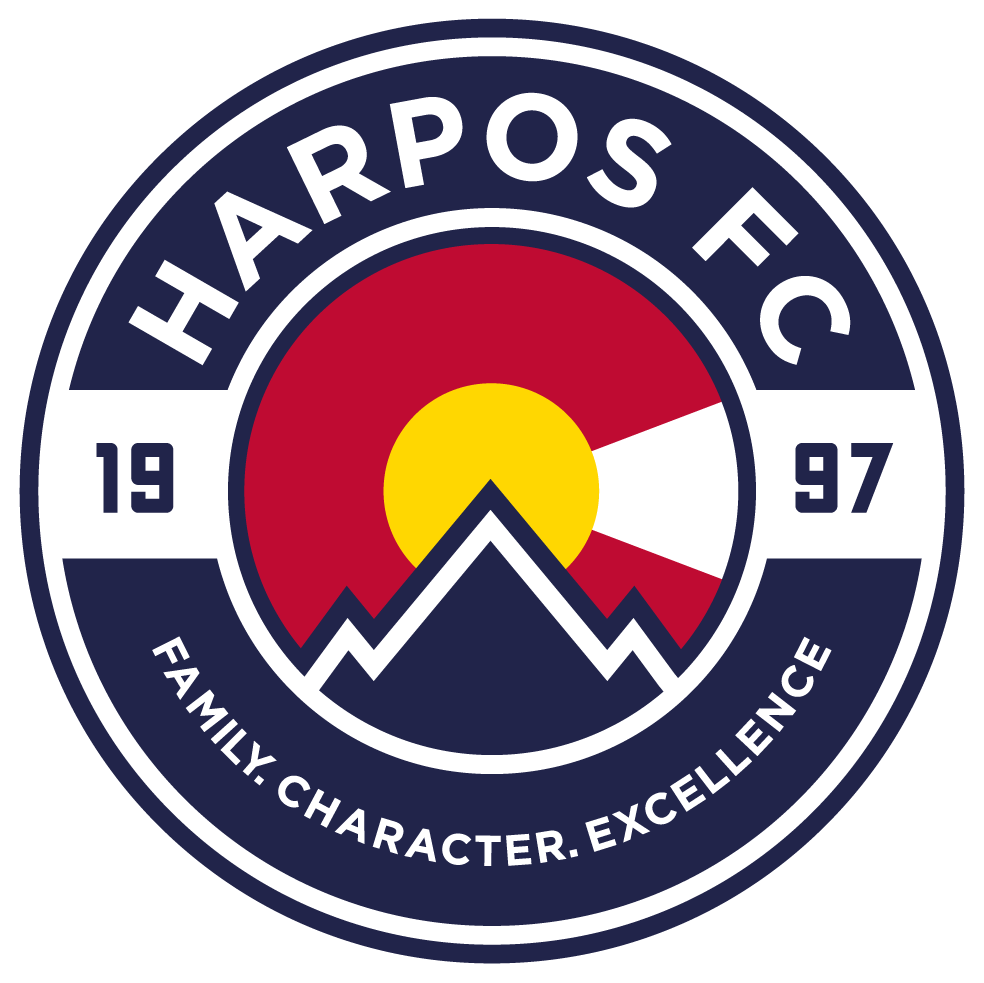
- Full name: Harpos Football Club
- Nicknames: Harpos, Bros, Brewers, Das Haus
- Founded: 1997
- Ground: University of Denver CIBER Field
- Capacity: 2500
- Founder: Johnny Freeston
- Technical Advisor: Steve Lepper
- League: USASA
- Website: https://www.harposfc.com/

Harpos Football Club, known as Harpos FC, is an American amateur soccer club based in Boulder, Colorado who play in the United States Adult Soccer Association. The team, founded by former undergraduates of the University of Colorado, has won 31 trophies since 2008 including the Breckenridge Tournament, City of Boulder, Colorado Premier League, Copa Alianza Denver, Premier Arena Soccer League Rocky Mountain Division, USSSA Colorado State Cup and Vail Invitational Tournament.

== History ==
Harpos FC was founded in 1997 by University of Colorado Boulder students Chris Hardin and Scotty Schuett under the name Barrel House. The club’s direction changed when Johnny Freeston joined as a player in 2005, took over managerial duties in 2008 and reorganised the team from 2010 into a more ambitious amateur side. Harpos developed a player base drawn from multiple U.S. states and abroad, many with college or semi-professional experience. The club settled into the Colorado Premier League and built a modern identity around former University of Colorado Boulder men's club players. From the 2010s onward, Harpos won several regional competitions, including the Breckenridge Tournament, Colorado Premier League titles and the USSSA Colorado State Cup.

Harpos made repeated appearances in the Lamar Hunt U.S. Open Cup. The team reached the second round of the 2015 Lamar Hunt U.S. Open Cup, defeating BYU Cougars on penalties before losing to Colorado Springs Switchbacks. In the 2016 Lamar Hunt U.S. Open Cup Harpos again reached the second round after beating Albuquerque Sol FC, before another defeat to Colorado Springs Switchbacks. The club later qualified for the 2020 U.S. Open Cup as part of a partnership with FC Boulder, competing under the name FC Boulder Harpos. This partnership began in mid 2019 and included integrated branding and programming. The side took part in the 2020 U.S. Open Cup Qualification tournament, and secured a berth by defeating Colorado Rovers S.C. in the third qualifying round. The COVID-19 pandemic cancelled the 2020 tournament, and the partnership with FC Boulder ended in 2020, with the club reverting to the Harpos FC name.

In 2021 Harpos joined the United States Adult Soccer Association and entered the Colorado Super League. The club continued its broader programme of expansion, fielding multiple teams, including over 30 and women's sides, while maintaining its competitive ambitions.
