= Med City FC =

- Full name: Med City Football Club
- Founded: 2017; 9 years ago
- Dissolved: 2024
- Stadium: Rochester Regional Stadium
- Capacity: 5,000
- Owner: Frank Spaeth
- Head coach: Luke Corey
- League: NPSL
- 2023: North Conference: 3rd Playoffs: Regional Semifinals; Overall: 27th
- Website: https://www.medcityfc.com/
Home colors	Away colors

Med City FC was a men's soccer club based in Rochester, Minnesota. It competed in the NPSL Midwest Region's North Conference. In January 2024, the club was purchased by the ownership group of Rochester FC and soon after ceased operations.

== History ==
Med City FC was founded in 2017 by Frank Spaeth, joining NPSL's North Conference as an expansion team.

In late 2019, City was announced as a participant in the 2020 U.S. Open Cup due to its performance in the previous season. This would be the team's first appearance in the tournament. However, on March 13, 2020, U.S. Soccer elected to temporarily suspend the tournament due to the ongoing COVID-19 pandemic. In January 2024, the club and its academy program were purchased by the ownership group of Rochester FC, another semi-professional soccer program in the city, and subsequently folded into the newly unified USL League Two club and youth academy program.

== Coaching staff ==
=== Staff ===
- (England) Neil Cassidy – Head Coach
- (Spain) Israel Perez Medina – Assistant Coach
- (United States) Mitch Amundson – Assistant Coach
- (United States) Frank Spaeth – Manager

== Supporters ==
The team's main supporter group was the Sawbones Army. The group's main purpose was "to create a rooting section for the club, complete with drumming, flags, scarves, and constant chanting and cheering." The group was officially recognized by the team as of the 2018 season.

== Year-by-year ==
Season	League											Position		Playoffs	USOC	Other
Season	League	Region	Pld	W	L	D	GF	GA	GD	Pts	PPG	Conf.	Overall	Playoffs	USOC	Other
2017	NPSL	Midwest	14	7	3	4	23	16	+7	25	1.93	4th, North	32nd	DNQ	Ineligible	N/A
2018	NPSL	Midwest	14	6	4	4	30	12	+18	22	1.57	4th, North	45th	DNQ	DNQ	N/A
2019	NPSL	Midwest	12	8	1	3	28	11	+17	27	2.25	2nd, North	16th	Regional Quarterfinals	DNQ	N/A
2020	NPSL	Midwest	Season cancelled due to COVID-19 pandemic													
2021	NPSL	Midwest	12	8	4	0	33	16	+17	24	2	3rd, North	18th	DNQ	Cancelled	N/A
2022	NPSL	Midwest	14	11	1	2	35	11	+24	35	2.5	1st, North	4th	Regional Semifinals	DNQ	N/A
2023	NPSL	Midwest	12	6	2	4	23	10	+13	22	1.83	3rd, North	27th	Regional Semifinals	DNQ	MN Super Cup, 1st
