= FC Arizona =

American soccer team

- Full name: Football Club Arizona
- Nickname: FCAZ
- Founded: July 16, 2016; 10 years ago
- Owner: Pablo Webster
- Technical Director: Raiff Gwinnett
- 3rd, Southwestern Conference; Playoffs: Conference Semifinal
- Website: fcarizona.com
Home colors	Away colors

FC Arizona was an American soccer team based in the Phoenix area that played in the National Premier Soccer League.

== History ==
FC Arizona announced its formation on July 19, 2016, with a press release. The team held a launch party on August 5, 2016, at Mesa Community College, where the team will play its home games. They joined the NPSL on September 22, 2016, and were placed in the Southwest Conference. The team colors are Blue and Gold.

== 2017 ==
FC Arizona defeated Real San Jose 5–0 in their first ever match on March 4, 2017, before an announced crowd of 2,842 at Riggs Stadium in Mesa, Arizona.

With team manager Aidan Davison, and former MLS keeper Andrew Weber in goal, the team then went on to have an undefeated regular season allowing only 3 goals and earning them the Western Conference Championship title. In the first round of the playoffs FC Arizona defeated Albion SD 3–1 to advance to the Western Division semi-final game, but lost to Orange County 2–0 ending a very successful season.

Team Recognition

Top Goal Scorers

1. Cesar Mexia – 9
2. Alejandro Aguilar – 8
3. Chris Ramsell – 4, Ignacio Coba – 4, George Jermy – 4

2017 Golden NPSL Golden Glove Award winner – Andrew Weber

- 13 Clean Sheets
- 3 Goals Allowed
- 1440 Minutes of play

Season Record – Western Conference Champions

	Games	W	L	D	GF	GA	Pts	Conf. Finish
2017 NPSL Season	16	12	0	4	47	3	40	1st Place

== 2018 ==
With new team manager Maximiliano "Maxi" Viera Dutra, FC Arizona played a tough season finishing a frustrating 4th place, but still making it to the playoffs for the second season. However, in the first round of the playoffs FC Arizona lost once again to Orange County 2–0.

Team Recognition

Top Goal Scorers

1. Cesar Mexia – 11

Season Record

	Games	W	L	D	GF	GA	Pts	Conf. Finish
2018 NPSL Season	12	5	5	2	20	13	17	4th Place

== 2019 ==
Player/Coaches Shannon Cole and Roberto Renteria took over the leadership of the NPSL in 2019 leading FC Arizona team to a 2nd place regular season finish and making it once again to the playoffs for the third season in a row. In the first round of the playoffs FC Arizona cruised to a 4–0 win over California's San Ramon. In the Western Division Semi-final they defeated Academica SC in a tight game winning 3–2. Making it to the Western Division Championship Game FC Arizona lost to conference rival Albion SD by the score of 1–2.

Team Recognition

Top Goal Scorers

1. Cesar Mexia – 18
2. Omar Nuno – 13

2019 NPSL Golden Boot Award winner – Cesar Mexia

Season Record

	Games	W	L	D	GF	GA	Pts	Conf. Finish
2019 NPSL Season	18	12	1	5	46	19	41	2nd Place

== 2020 ==
Under new ownership, and the direction of NPSL Team Coach and FC Arizona Technical Director Dave Rogers, FC Arizona started off strong, undefeated after 3 games and sitting in first place in the Western Conference before COVID caused the season to be cancelled.

Season Record – Partial Season Cancelled due to COVID outbreak

	Games	W	L	D	GF	GA	Pts	Conf. Finish
2020 NPSL Season	3	2	0	1	6	3	7	1st Place before season cancellation

== 2021 ==
Taking off where they left off before the cancellation of the 2020 season, FC Arizona went on to finish the regular season in 3rd place making it to the NPSL playoffs again for the 4th time, but lost to Golden State in the first round by the score of 0–2.

Team Recognition

Top Goal Scorers

1. Tobenna Uzo – 7

Season Record

	Games	W	L	D	GF	GA	Pts	Conf. Finish
2021 NPSL Season	10	4	2	4	22	13	16	3nd Place

== Staff ==
- (United States) Pablo Webster – Owner
- (United Kingdom) Raiff Gwinnett – Technical Director
- (United States) Amanda Shaffer – Executive Director
- (United States) Eli Perez – Boys Director of Coaching
- (Costa Rica) Alejandro Aguilar – ECNL-RL Director

== Stadiums ==
- John D. Riggs Stadium, Mesa Community College, Mesa, Arizona (2017–2018)
- Mesa High School, Mesa, Arizona (2019)
- Campo Verde High School, Gilbert, Arizona (2020–2021)
- Bell Bank Park Stadium, Legacy Sports Complex, Mesa, Arizona (2022)
- Campo Verde High School, Gilbert, Arizona (2023–Present)
