= Virginia United FC (United States) =

- Full name: Virginia United FC
- Nickname: VA United
- Founded: 2016
- Ground: Howison Homestead Soccer Complex; Manassas, Virginia
- Head Coach: Jimmy Ramos
- League: Asociacon Nacional Futbol en USA; Woodbridge Soccer League; Eastern Premier Soccer League

Virginia United Football Club is an American amateur soccer team based in Woodbridge, Virginia. The club plays in the amateur Woodbridge Virginia Adult Soccer League, and earned recognition in 2019 when they qualified for the 2019 U.S. Open Cup.

== History ==
=== 2019 Open Cup run ===
The club put together a remarkable run during the 2019 U.S. Open Cup qualification stages to earn their first ever berth into the U.S. Open Cup, the national cup competition in the United States (similar to the FA Cup). On October 21, 2018; Virginia United opened their qualification with a 2–0 victory against Super Delegates of Maryland.

In the third qualifying round, played on November 18, 2018; United played Christos FC. Christos, which is highly composed of former college soccer players, received Open Cup notoriety in 2017 for their run in the 2017 U.S. Open Cup. United won the match 2–1 to advance to the fourth and final qualifying round in April 2019.

== Club ==
=== Roster ===
As of April 14, 2019

Note: Flags indicate national team as defined under FIFA eligibility rules; some limited exceptions apply. Players may hold more than one non-FIFA nationality.

No.	Pos.	Nation	Player
0	GK	USA	Luis Guevara
1	GK	SLV	Manuel Medrano
3	DF	HON	Denis Najar
4	DF	USA	Juan Pablo Saavedra
5	DF	USA	Edgar Zepeda
6	MF	USA	Allan Flott
7	DF	CRC	Karl Gibbons
8	MF	USA	Ricky Burke
10	FW	SLV	Elias Martinez
11	FW	USA	Ernesto Marquez Jr
12	MF	USA	Sergio Rodriguez
13	FW	USA	Cristhian Osorio
14	MF	USA	Carlos Cartagena

No.	Pos.	Nation	Player
15	DF	USA	Manuel De Jesus Ramos Jr
16	MF	USA	Eric Otero
17	DF	USA	Miguel Hernandez Jr
18	FW	USA	Ramzey Hassen
19	FW	USA	Luis Aguilar
20	MF	USA	Eber Martinez
21	FW	SLV	Bernardo Majano
—	FW	USA	Joseph Richard Barnd
—	FW	GHA	Kofi Obeng Boamah
—	FW	USA	Santo Eduardo
—	DF	USA	Irvin Geovanny Martinez
—	MF	HON	Cristhyan Najar
—	MF	ARG	Nestor Guillermo Tolaba

=== Coaching staff ===
- Head coach: Jimmy Ramos
