= 2019 U.S. Open Cup qualification =

2019 Lamar Hunt U.S. Open Cup qualification
Tournament details
- Dates: September 22, 2018 – April 7, 2019
- Teams: 94

The 2019 Lamar Hunt U.S. Open Cup tournament proper will feature teams from all five tiers of the men's American soccer pyramid.

Qualification for the 2019 tournament includes local qualifying matches contested by 94 amateur teams scheduled to take place in 2018. One team also qualified by winning the 2018 National Amateur Cup, and other clubs playing in national leagues that are not fully professional qualify based on their results in 2018 league play. Clubs playing in fully professional leagues may enter the tournament proper and bypass the qualification process.

== Qualification procedures ==
The United States Soccer Federation's (U.S. Soccer) Open Cup Committee manages both the tournament proper and the local qualification process.

Clubs based in the United States that play in a league that is an organization member of U.S. Soccer are generally eligible to compete for the U.S. Open Cup, if their league includes at least four teams and has a schedule of at least 10 matches for each club.

U.S.-based teams in Division I, II and III professional leagues qualify for the U.S. Open Cup automatically, provided they are eligible. To be eligible, these teams must be members in good standing of their leagues on December 31, 2018, and remain so through the 2019 U.S. Open Cup Final. The league must also remain in operation through the U.S. Open Cup Final. A new Division I, II or III professional league must have its match schedule announced to the public by January 31, 2019, and the first match must be scheduled for no later than seven days before the first scheduled round of the U.S. Open Cup tournament proper that involves the team's division. If a new club joins an existing Division I, II or III league, the league must meet the aforementioned criteria applicable to new leagues in order for the new club to be eligible for the U.S. Open Cup.

A professional team that is majority owned by a higher-level professional team or whose player roster is materially managed by a higher-level professional team is ineligible to participate in the U.S. Open Cup.

Clubs that are below Division III are Open Division teams. To be eligible for the 2019 U.S. Open Cup, an Open Division team must have been a playing member in good standing of its league on August 13, 2018, and remain so through the 2019 U.S. Open Cup Final. The league must have been in operation since no later than July 14, 2018, and remain so until the 2019 U.S. Open Cup Final. A team that started its first season of competition in an existing league must have started its new league's schedule no later than July 14, 2018.

Starting in 2019, the winner of the previous year's National Amateur Cup automatically qualifies for the U.S. Open Cup. The cup winner enters the tournament proper in the first round with the other Open Division clubs.

National leagues may elect to use the results of their previous year's seasons to determine which of their teams qualify for the U.S. Open Cup in lieu of having their teams play local qualifying matches. If a national league so elects, its teams are not eligible to participate in local qualifying. To qualify as a national league, the league must

- Have a minimum of 50 active U.S.-based teams in good standing,
- Have a common championship each season that is only available to league teams and is compulsory,
- Use a league format with a standings table as opposed to a single-elimination (knockout) format,
- Have teams in at least three U.S. time zones among Eastern, Central, Mountain and Pacific, with the three time zones containing the most teams each having at least 15% of the member teams,
- Have two time zones represented by at least three different U.S. states or the District of Columbia and a third time zone represented by at least two different U.S. states or the District of Columbia,
- Have teams in at least 10 different U.S. states or the District of Columbia,
- Have played for at least three years meeting the above criteria and
- Timely pay the team-based Open Cup entry fee for all teams in the league.

Both leagues which currently qualify as national leagues, the National Premier Soccer League (NPSL) and USL League Two (formerly the Premier Development League, or PDL), elected to use the results of their 2018 seasons to determine their qualifying teams for the 2019 U.S. Open Cup. National leagues determine their own procedures for ranking teams based on 2018 results for the purposes of 2019 U.S. Open Cup qualification.

Eligible Open Division clubs that did not win the National Amateur Cup and are not members of national leagues must have submitted an application to enter local qualifying by August 13, 2018.

Once applications for local qualifying are approved, U.S. Soccer estimates the number of Open Division teams needed in the U.S. Open Cup, based on the anticipated participation of professional teams. One of these slots is allocated to the National Amateur Cup champions. The remainder are allocated among the pool of local qualification teams and the national leagues, based on the relative number of teams in each, resulting in a target number of local qualifiers. The number of rounds of local qualifying and the number of teams receiving byes in the first round of qualifying are then established to set the number of local qualifiers as close as possible to the target number. Byes are distributed randomly and are meant to avoid unnecessary travel but are kept to a minimum to preserve the integrity of the qualification tournament. Once the qualification tournament format has been finalized, the number of local qualifiers becomes fixed, unless a team that qualifies later becomes ineligible. After the December 31, 2018 professional clubs entry application deadline, the final number of Open Division teams needed in the 2019 U.S. Open Cup will become known. From this number, the fixed number of local qualifiers plus one for the National Amateur Cup champion are subtracted to determine the number of slots for clubs from the national leagues. These slots are allocated among the leagues based on their relative numbers of U.S.-based eligible teams.

== National league track ==
=== National Premier Soccer League ===
The NPSL ranked the top 30 of its 98 U.S.-based clubs based on results of its 2018 season for the purposes of qualification for the 2019 U.S. Open Cup. The NPSL champion earned the top ranking, and the other finalist is second. The national semifinal loser from the region with the larger number of teams is ranked third, and the remaining national semifinalist is ranked fourth. The four regional final losers are ranked fifth through eighth based on the number of teams in their region, from largest to smallest. The remaining 22 slots in the rankings are allocated among the regions based on their sizes. The total number of slots allocated to each region are South 9, Northeast 8, Midwest 7 and West 6. Since U.S. Soccer has not yet determined how many berths NPSL clubs will be awarded in the U.S. Open Cup, each of the 22 slots available in the rankings for teams that did not reach the region finals are each allocated to a specific region. This ensures that, regardless of the number of berths awarded to NPSL clubs, the berths will have been allocated as fairly as possible, taking into account the relative sizes of the regions. The allocation of the ninth through 30th slots for 2019 qualifying is as follows:

Region	Position
South	9, 12, 15, 19, 22, 25, 28
Northeast	10, 14, 17, 21, 26, 29
Midwest	11, 16, 20, 24, 30
West	13, 18, 23, 27

Starting with the ninth slot, no conference that already has a team in the rankings may have an additional team claim a slot, until every conference in the region has at least one team in the rankings. Ties in the standings are broken using regular-season conference tiebreaker procedures.

Pos	Team	APPG	Explanation
1	Miami FC 2	N/A	NPSL champion
2	FC Motown	N/A	NPSL finalist
3	Duluth FC	N/A	Midwest Region champion (22 clubs)
4	FC Mulhouse Portland	N/A	West Region champion (20 clubs)
5	Little Rock Rangers	N/A	South Region finalist (30 clubs)
6	New York Cosmos B	N/A	Northeast Region finalist (26 clubs)
7	AFC Ann Arbor	N/A	Midwest Region finalist (22 clubs)
8	Orange County FC	N/A	West Region finalist (20 clubs)
9	Laredo Heat	3	Representing Lone Star Conference
10	FC Baltimore	N/A	Representing Mid-Atlantic Conference
11	Erie Commodores FC	N/A	Representing East Conference
12	Chattanooga FC	2	Representing Southeast Conference
13	El Farolito	N/A	Representing Golden Gate Conference
14	Junior Lone Star FC	2.4	Northeast Region #4 club
15	Midland-Odessa Sockers FC	2.2 (Note: The teams have identical records. Midland-Odessa wins the tiebreaker on average goal difference per game, 2.2 to 1.3.)	South Region #5 club
16	Minneapolis City SC	2.4	Midwest Region #4 club
17	Brooklyn Italians	2.2	Northeast Region #5 club
18	ASC San Diego	2.3	West Region #4 club
19	FC Wichita	2.2	South Region #6 club
20	Cleveland SC	2	Midwest Region #5 club
21	West Chester United SC	2.1	Northeast Region #6 club
22	Houston Dutch Lions FC	2.1	South Region #7 club
23	FC Golden State	2.2 (Note: Golden State wins the tiebreaker on average wins per game, 0.7 to 0.6.)	West Region #5 club
24	Grand Rapids FC	1.9	Midwest Region #6 club
25	Fort Worth Vaqueros FC	2 (Note: Fort Worth wins the tiebreaker on average wins per game, 0.60 to 0.58.)	South Region #8 club
26	Hartford City FC	1.9 (Note: All three teams have identical records. Hartford City wins the tiebreaker over Monmouth and Northern Virginia on average goal difference per game, 0.6 to 0.3. Since Monmouth and Northern Virginia have identical records and goal differences, a coin flip would break the tie, if necessary, i.e. if the NPSL is allocated at least 29 slots in the U.S. Open Cup.)	Northeast Region #7 club
27	Spokane SC Shadow	2.2	West Region #6 club
28	Jacksonville Armada FC	2	South Region #9 club
29	FC Monmouth	1.9	Northeast Region #8 club
29	Northern Virginia United FC	1.9	Northeast Region #8 club
30	Rochester Lancers	1.8	Midwest Region #7 club

=== USL League Two ===
USL League Two elected to use the results of the 2018 PDL regular season to rank its 69 U.S.-based teams for the purposes of qualification for the 2019 U.S. Open Cup. The highest placing teams from each division, provided that they are American, are ranked first in order of points. The remaining teams are then ranked based on points regardless of division. The 2018 PDL regular-season standings tiebreaker system is invoked when needed. The rankings of the USL League Two teams for 2019 U.S. Open Cup qualification are shown in the table below.

Pos	Team	Points	Explanation
1	Des Moines Menace	40	Heartland Division champion
2	Reading United AC	38	Mid Atlantic Division champion
3	FC Golden State Force	37	Southwest Division champion
4	South Georgia Tormenta FC	36	Deep South Division champion
5	SIMA Águilas	32	Southeast Division champion
6	Brazos Valley Cavalry F.C.	30 (Note: The teams have identical records and did not play one another. Brazos Valley wins the tiebreaker on goal difference in league matches, +23 to +14.)	Mid South Division champion
7	Black Rock FC	30	Northeast Division champion
8	Myrtle Beach Mutiny	28 (Note: The teams have identical records and did not play one another. Myrtle Beach wins the tiebreaker on goal difference in league matches, +21 to +19.)	South Atlantic Division champion
9	Colorado Rapids U-23	28	Mountain Division champion
10	Dayton Dutch Lions	27	Great Lakes Division champion
11	New York Red Bulls U-23	31	
12	The Villages SC	30 (Note: The Villages had a home win and a road draw in its two matches with Lakeland to win the tiebreaker.)	
13	Lakeland Tropics	30	
14	OKC Energy U23	28 (Note: OKC and Long Island win the tiebreaker over Mississippi on in league matches, 9 to 8. OKC wins the tiebreaker over Long Island on goal difference in league matches, +15 to +10.)	
15	Long Island Rough Riders	28	
16	Mississippi Brilla	28	
17	Ocean City Nor'easters	27	
18	Lansing United	26	
19	FC Tucson	25	
20	SC United Bantams	24 (Note: The teams have identical records and did not play one another. SC United wins the tiebreaker on goal difference in league matches, +13 to +7.)	
21	GPS Portland Phoenix	24	
22	Chicago FC United	23 (Note: Chicago wins the tiebreaker on wins in league matches, 7 to 6.)	
23	North Carolina FC U23	23	
24	Ventura County Fusion	22 (Note: Since only Cincinnati and Michigan played one another, the head-to-head tiebreaker does not apply. Ventura County wins the standings tiebreaker on wins in league matches with 7, compared with Cincinnati, Michigan and Western Mass, which had 6 each. Michigan, which lost a tiebreaker to Cincinnati in the Great Lakes Division standings, wins the tiebreaker over Cincinnati and Western Mass on goal difference in league matches: Michigan +24, Cincinnati +7, Western Mass +4.)	
25	Michigan Bucks	22	
26	Cincinnati Dutch Lions	22	
27	Western Mass Pioneers	22	
28	AHFC Royals	21 (Note: AHFC wins the tiebreaker over Seattle and Orange County on wins in league matches, 7 to 6. Seattle then wins the tiebreaker over Orange County on goal difference in league matches, +5 to +2.)	
29	Seattle Sounders FC U-23	21	
30	Orange County SC U-23	21	
31	St. Louis Lions	20 (Note: Although Fresno and Santa Cruz played one another, and Kaw Valley and St. Louis played one another, the head-to-head tiebreaker does not apply, since not all tied teams played each other an equal number of times. St. Louis, Corpus Christi, Santa Cruz, Fresno, Kaw Valley and Bradenton win the tiebreaker over Lane on wins in league matches, 6 to 5. St. Louis, which lost a tiebreaker to Kaw Valley in the Heartland Division standings, wins the tiebreaker over Corpus Christi, Santa Cruz, Fresno, Kaw Valley and Bradenton on goal difference in league matches: St. Louis +2, Corpus Christi 0, Santa Cruz 0, Fresno -1, Kaw Valley -2, Bradenton -6. Corpus Christi wins the tiebreaker over Santa Cruz on goals scored in league matches, 32 to 19.)	
32	Corpus Christi FC	20	
33	Santa Cruz Breakers FC	20	
34	Fresno FC U-23	20	
35	Kaw Valley FC	20	
36	IMG Academy Bradenton	20	
37	Lane United FC	20	
38	Birmingham Hammers	19	
39	Texas United	18 (Note: The teams have identical records and did not play one another. Texas wins the tiebreaker on goal difference in league matches, 0 to -2.)	
40	FC Boston	18	
41	Tri-Cities Otters	17 (Note: Tri-Cities and Connecticut win the tiebreaker over Lionsbridge on wins in league matches, 5 to 4. Tri-Cities wins the tiebreaker over Connecticut on goal difference in league matches, +2 to -13.)	
42	AC Connecticut	17	
43	Lionsbridge FC	17	
44	San Francisco City FC	16 (Note: Although San Francisco City and the San Francisco Glens played one another, the head-to-head tiebreaker does not apply, since not all tied teams played each other an equal number of times. San Francisco City and Miami City win the tiebreaker over the San Francisco Glens, Peachtree City and Albuquerque on wins in league matches, 5 to 4. San Francisco City wins the tiebreaker over Miami City on goal difference in league matches, -8 to -11. The San Francisco Glens win the tiebreaker over Peachtree City and Albuquerque on goal difference in league matches: San Francisco Glens -1, Peachtree City -8, Albuquerque -13.)	
45	FC Miami City	16	
46	San Francisco Glens	16	
47	Peachtree City MOBA	16	
48	Albuquerque Sol FC	16	
49	Colorado Pride Switchbacks U23	15 (Note: Colorado wins the tiebreaker over West Virginia on total wins in league matches, 4 to 3.)	
50	West Virginia Chaos	15	
51	San Diego Zest FC	14	
52	Southern California Seahorses	13 (Note: Southern California, Weston and Cleburne win the tiebreaker over Charlotte, Tobacco Road and Westchester on total wins in league matches: Southern California 4, Weston 4, Cleburne 4, Charlotte 3, Tobacco Road 3, Westchester 2. Southern California wins the tiebreaker over Weston and Cleburne on goal difference in league matches: Southern California -8, Weston -12, Cleburne -22. Charlotte had one road win and two home draws in its three matches with Tobacco Road.)	
53	Weston FC	13	
54	FC Cleburne	13	
55	Charlotte Eagles	13	
56	Tobacco Road FC	13	
57	Westchester Flames	13	
58	Next Academy Palm Beach	12 (Note: Palm Beach wins the tiebreaker on total wins in league matches, 4 to 3.)	
59	Ogden City SC	12	
60	Portland Timbers U23	11 (Note: Portland wins the tiebreaker on total wins in league matches, 3 to 2.)	
61	Carolina Dynamo	11	
62	Seacoast United Phantoms	10 (Note: The teams have identical records and did not play one another. Seacoast wins the tiebreaker on goal difference in league matches, -4 to -15.)	
63	Houston FC	10	
64	F.A. Euro	9	
65	North County United	8	
66	Memphis City FC	6	
67	Evergreen FC	5	
68	Lehigh Valley United	4	
69	Derby City Rovers	1	

== National Amateur Cup ==
Milwaukee Bavarian SC defeated West Chester United, 2–0, to win the 2018 National Amateur Cup and qualify for the 2019 U.S. Open Cup. The seven winners of the fourth round of local qualifying will join them as the eight Open Division teams in the tournament proper.

== Local qualifying ==
U.S. Soccer originally announced that 95 teams would participate in local qualifying. However, Naples United FC 2 was disqualified, because the club was not affiliated with the U.S. Specialty Sports Association by the deadline for local amateur sides to participate in sanctioned league competition.

Four rounds of local qualifying matches will result in 7 clubs advancing to the tournament proper.

=== First qualifying round ===
The first qualifying round matches were scheduled to be played on September 22 and 23. Some matches were played on later dates due to weather delays.

==== Northeast Region ====
September 22	Southie FC (Massachusetts)	1–2 (a.e.t.)	(Massachusetts) GPS Omens	Boston, Massachusetts
12:00 ET	Grisell 24'; Kakambouras (yellow card) 106'	Report	Kelly 10'; Goldman 106'	Stadium: Madison Park Technical Vocational High School - Upper Field; Referee: Juliano Soares

September 22	Kendall Wanderers (Massachusetts)	2–2 (a.e.t.) (9–8 p)	(Massachusetts) Boston Siege FC	Cambridge, Massachusetts
14:00 ET	Robertson (yellow card) 47'; Sweeney (yellow card) 96'; Reid 97'; Bueno 103'	USSF Report; TheCup.US Report	Barrientos (yellow card) 48'; Davis 108'; Erazo 112'	Stadium: Danehy Park - Field 3 Referee: Jeremy Scheer
	Penalties
	Bridges (penalty scored); Bueno (penalty scored); Miller (penalty scored); Mulkern (penalty scored); Reid (penalty scored); Robertson (penalty scored); Whelan (penalty missed); Samati (penalty scored); Sweeney (penalty scored); Hunter (penalty scored)		(penalty scored) Aguilar; (penalty scored) Alarcon; (penalty scored) Davis; (penalty scored) Erazo; (penalty scored) Firme; (penalty scored) Godeiro; (penalty scored) K. Martinez; (penalty missed) M. Martinez

September 22	Safira FC (Massachusetts)	3–1	(Massachusetts) Mass United FC	Somerville, Massachusetts
19:00 ET	Guimaraes 17', 64'; Pierrot (yellow card) 28'; Bomfim 53'; De Almeida-Correia (yellow card) 67'	Report	Mo. Saeed (yellow card) 40'; Tepe (yellow card) 64'; Conde (yellow card) 67'; Irons 69'; Ma. Saeed (yellow card) 88'	Stadium: Dilboy Stadium; Referee: Miguel Lara

September 22	Jackson Lions FC (New Jersey)	1–0 (a.e.t.)	(Connecticut) Newtown Pride FC	Jackson Township, New Jersey
19:30 ET	Jeffery (yellow card) 32'; Fryc (yellow card) 39'; Bond (yellow card) 77'; Bailey 105+3'	USSF Report; TheCup.US Report	Dutra (yellow card) 72' (red card) 120'; Sylvester (yellow card) 76' (red card) 120'; Morgan (yellow card) 105'; Keita (yellow card) 110'; Turizo (red card) 120'	Stadium: Jackson Justice Complex - Soccer Turf Field

September 22	Lansdowne Yonkers FC (New York (state))	0–4	(New York (state)) New York Pancyprian-Freedoms	Yonkers, New York
20:00 ET	Bah (yellow card) 73'; Kavanagh (yellow card) 89'; Kelly (yellow card) 90'	Report	Himeno 24', 83'; Palacio 69'; Magoulas 75'	Stadium: Tibbett's Brook Park - Field 3 Referee: Jared Simons

September 23	Ukrainian Nationals (Pennsylvania)	2–0	(Pennsylvania) United German Hungarians	North Wales, Pennsylvania
14:30 ET	Griffith 23', 84'	Report	Akom (yellow card) 78'; Raykovitz (yellow card) 86'	Stadium: Ukrainian American Sports Center - Field 1 Referee: Patrick Casey

September 23	Vereinigung Erzgebirge (Pennsylvania)	0–1	(Pennsylvania) West Chester Predators	Warminster, Pennsylvania
14:30 ET		USSF Report; TheCup.US Report	Greer 57'	Stadium: Vereinigung Erzgebirge Clubhouse; Referee: Jaroslaw Werel

September 23	Boston City FC II (Massachusetts)	1–0	(Massachusetts) Juve-Pro Soccer	Malden, Massachusetts
18:00 ET	A. Silva (yellow card) 15'; Callahan (yellow card) 40' (yellow-red card) 43'; Nascimento-Batista 53'; Rincon-Gonzalez (yellow card) 77'; Leite-Soares (red card) 80'	Report	Franco de Souza (yellow card) 13'; Mo. Lopes (yellow card) 40'; Barros (red card) 45'; Monteiro (yellow card) 68'; De Oliveira (yellow card) 83'	Stadium: Brother Gilbert Stadium; Referee: Randall Kelley

==== Mid-Atlantic Region ====
September 22	Tigres FC (Virginia)	1–3	(Virginia) Cville Alliance FC - Reserves	Charlottesville, Virginia
18:00 ET	Mohammed (yellow card) 88'; Da Silva 90'	USSF Report; TheCup.US Report	Thomas 20'; Nesterak 60'; Oostdyk 86'	Stadium: St. Anne's-Belfield School; Referee: John Lesniak

September 22	Izee Auto FC (Maryland)	2–4	(Maryland) World Class Premier Elite FC	Columbia, Maryland
19:00 ET	Deen 11'; Caulker (yellow card) 80'; Kareem 86'	USSF Report; TheCup.US Report	Houapeu 27', 78'; Sesay 32'; Ankrah 72'	Stadium: Blandair Regional Park; Referee: Andrew Lea-Wilson

September 23	Christos FC (Maryland)	4–1	(Maryland) Rockville Soccer Club	Elkridge, Maryland
15:00 ET	Caringi III 6', 38', 50', 68'	Report	Lozano-Arguilar (yellow card) 71'; Musa 86'	Stadium: Troy Park - Field 2 Referee: Ariel Raban

September 23	Steel Pulse FC (Maryland)	1–2	(Maryland) Aegean Hawks	Elkridge, Maryland
15:00 ET	Addo (yellow card) 30'; Mensah 71'; Agyeman-Prempeh (yellow card) 90'; Serrano (yellow card) 90'	Report	Stewart 7'; Fallet 66'	Stadium: Troy Park - Field 2 Referee: Stephen Foster

September 23	DC Cheddar (Washington, D.C.)	1–4	(Maryland) Super Delegates Football Club	Washington, D.C.
18:30 ET	Blickle 2'; Sarda (yellow card) 31'	Report	Johnson 19', 88'; Tatchou 26', 52'; Bell (yellow card) 52'	Stadium: Jelleff Recreation Center; Referee: JT Alukonis

September 23	Centro America FC (Virginia)	1–2	Virginia United	Manassas, Virginia
19:00 ET	Morales (yellow card) 42'; Benavidez 72'; Varela (yellow card) 73'; Mejia (yellow card) 78'	Report	Aguilar 39' (yellow card) 22'; Burke 67'; E. Martinez-Campos (yellow card) 68'; Zepeda (yellow card) 69'; Rodriguez-Fugon (yellow card) 90+1'	Stadium: Howison Homestead Soccer Complex - Field 1 Referee: Patrick McFall

Received bye to second round of qualification:

- Rochester River Dogz (New York (state))
- Tartan Devils Oak Avalon (Pennsylvania)

==== Southeast Region ====
September 22	Miami Sun FC (Florida)	1–2	Florida Soccer Soldiers	Miami, Florida
20:15 ET	Barroso (yellow card) 14'; Zuleta 38'; Gonzalez (yellow card) 55'; Mas (yellow card) 63'	Report	Sabella 12'; Dar. Rios 29' (yellow card) 60'; Meneses-Freire (yellow card) 81'; Moreno-Ramos (yellow card) 90+4'	Stadium: Kendall Soccer Park - Field 2 Referee: Javier Santos

September 22	America Soccer Club (Florida)	1–0 (a.e.t.)	(Florida) Orlando FC Wolves	Winter Garden, Florida
20:30 ET	Avila-De Melo (yellow card) 33'; Teixeira 105' (yellow card) 47'	Report	May (yellow card) 43'; Wallace (yellow card) 56'; Wixted (yellow card) 58'	Stadium: West Orange High School; Referee: Matthew Miscannon

September 23	Deportivo Lake Mary (Florida)	1–2	(Florida) Sporting Orlando Soccer Club	Kissimmee, Florida
13:00 ET	Prada (yellow card) 38'; Hurtado 47'; Mosquera (yellow card) 69' (yellow-red card) 84'; Caicedo (red card) 85'	Report	Lantin 45'; Rojas (yellow card) 57'; V. Oliveira 71' (yellow card) 89'	Stadium: Johnson University Florida; Referee: Esteban Rosano

September 23	Soda City FC Sorinex (South Carolina)	5–1	(North Carolina) FC Cardinals	Columbia, South Carolina
15:00 ET	Haynes 9'; Jacobo 30'; Smith 45', 50'; Restrepo (yellow card) 82'; Roberts 83'	Report	J. Salinas-Medina (yellow card) 23'; Parral-Cruz 89'	Stadium: Columbia International University; Referee: Wilmer Soriano

September 23	Red Force FC (Florida)	2–1	(Florida) FC Kendall	Miami, Florida
20:30 ET	Salinas 64'; Fernandes (yellow card) 83'; Palucci 90'; Mendoza (yellow card) 90+2'	Report	Raudales (yellow card) 21'; Navas (yellow card) 70'; S. Schmid (yellow card) 71' (red card) 71'; Andrade 73'	Stadium: Tropical Park; Referee: Juan Pablo Casas

Received bye to second round of qualification:

- Central Florida FC Spartans
- Hurricane FC (Florida)
- Shahin Atlanta FC (Georgia (U.S. state))

==== Central Region ====
September 22	Motagua New Orleans (Louisiana)	5–2 (a.e.t.)	(Mississippi) Port City FC	New Orleans, Louisiana
19:00 CT	Barros 9', 119'; Arzú 97' (yellow card) 18'; Peters (yellow card) 23'; Chagnard 80'; Peralta 92' (yellow card) 90'	Report	Cosgrave (yellow card) 16'; Allizo (yellow card) 23'; Ogbonna 40'; 50' (o.g.); Arde (yellow card) 116'	Stadium: Pan American Stadium; Referee: Tyler Mitcham

September 22	Dallas Elite FC (Texas)	4–4 (a.e.t.) (3–4 p)	(Texas) NTX Rayados	Plano, Texas
19:30 CT	Okumu (yellow card) 29'; Martinez-Gutierrez 75'; Molano 90+1' (pen.) (yellow card) 76'; Romero (yellow card) 98' (yellow-red card) 98'; DeLeon 109'; Umanzor 119'	USSF Report; TheCup.US Report	Pfluger 56' (yellow card) 90'; Wilson 65', 120+1'; Pinal (yellow card) 86'; Nickerson 115'	Stadium: Lions Stadium; Referee: Lorenzo Hernandez
	Penalties
	Lee (penalty scored); Balyeat (penalty missed); Umanzor (penalty scored); Toldeo (penalty scored); Martinez-Gutierrez (penalty missed)		(penalty scored) Garza; (penalty scored) Nickerson; (penalty scored) Okeke; (penalty missed) Wilson; (penalty missed) Rodriguez; (penalty scored) Ellis

September 23	Ann Arbor FC (Michigan)	3–4 (a.e.t.)	(Michigan) Livonia City FC	Saline, Michigan
16:00 ET	Bantle 36'; Ducker 38', 43'; Caceres (yellow card) 64'; Hamodi (yellow card) 72'; Akpore-Idise (yellow card) 90' (yellow-red card) 105'	Report	Bechard 20'; Werthman 24'; Smith 54'; Beebe 116'	Stadium: Saline High School - Stadium Field; Referee: Carter Brochu

September 29 (Note: Match was postponed from originally scheduled date due to heavy rain.)	Celtic Cowboys Premier (Texas)	3–1	(Texas) San Antonio Runners	Austin, Texas
15:00 CT	Peoples 65'; Wright 68' (pen.); Ali (yellow card) 69'; Jackson 90'	USSF Report; TheCup.US Report	Pratt 60'; Rivera (yellow card) 68'	Stadium: Onion Creek Soccer Complex - Field 4 Referee: Josh Allen

October 7 (Note: Match was postponed twice from originally scheduled date due to heavy rain and flooding.)	Bay Area Oiler FC (Texas)	0–2	(Texas) Leon FC	Katy, Texas
13:00 CT		USSF Report; TheCup.US Report	C. Bryce (yellow card) 44'; Morales 78'; Diebold 88'	Stadium: British International School of Houston; Referee: Gerald Flores

Notes:

Received bye to second round of qualification:

- (Illinois) Aurora Borealis Soccer Club
- (Missouri) FC Maritsa
- FC Minnesota

==== Mountain Region ====
September 23	Colorado Rovers	1–0	(Colorado) Club El Azul	Broomfield, Colorado
15:00 MT	Platz (yellow card) 38'; Berkes (yellow card) 69' (yellow-red card) 78'; Anaya 72'; Berkes (yellow card) 88'; Emge (red card) 88'	Report	Ruiz (yellow card) 46'; Vasquez (yellow card) 53'; Guillen (yellow card) 68'	Stadium: Broomfield Commons - Championship Turf; Referee: Chris Greer

September 23	Gam United Football Club (Colorado)	2–1	(Colorado) Northern Colorado FC	Aurora, Colorado
16:00 MT	Hissein 12'; Swope 18'; Fouad (yellow card) 20' (yellow-red card) 35'; Latona (yellow card) 28'; Sarpong (yellow card) 48'; Abiar (yellow card) 65'; Soumah (yellow card) 73'	USSF Report; TheCup.US Report	Keene (yellow card) 53'; Martinez 58' (pen.); Larson (yellow card) 69'	Stadium: Aurora Public Schools Stadium; Referee: Brean Roman

September 23	Colorado Rush (Colorado)	1–2 (a.e.t.)	(Colorado) Harpo's FC	Highlands Ranch, Colorado
17:00 MT	Grover 77'; Parry (yellow card) 101'; Clark (yellow card) 120'	USSF Report; TheCup.US Report	Whittle (yellow card) 57'; McKinney 69' (pen.); Akinsanya (yellow card) 87'; Jennings (yellow card) 104'; Amman 115' (yellow card) 115'	Stadium: Shea Stadium; Referee: Jason Hampton

September 23	Indios Denver FC (Colorado)	0–1	(Colorado) FC Denver	Englewood, Colorado
18:00 MT	Otto (yellow card) 72'; Ramos (yellow card) 84'	Report	A. Bernhardt 81'	Stadium: Englewood High School; Referee: Miguel Urbina-Barrios

Received bye to second round of qualification:

- (Idaho) Boise Cutthroats FC
- (Utah) San Juan FC
- (Texas) Southwest FC
- (Arizona) Sporting AZ FC

==== Southern California Region ====
September 22	L.A. Wolves FC (California)	0–4	(California) Santa Ana Winds FC	Lake Forest, California
19:00 PT	Ajeakwa (yellow card) 37'; Becerra (yellow card) 64'	Report	Gorman 18', 35', 81' (yellow card) 62'; Ocampo (yellow card) 41'; Ca. Torres (yellow card) 52'; Cruz-Salinas 55'	Stadium: Lake Forest Sports Park - Field B Referee: Anthony Almeida

September 22	CaliGators FC (California)	2–6	California United FC II	Lake Forest, California
18:30 PT	Echeverria 21' (yellow card) 34'; Ede. Oliva 76' (yellow card) 40'; Cannas (yellow card) 84'	Report	Villalobos-Carbajal 8', 35', 44'; Coronado 24'; Garcia-Lopez 78' (yellow card) 37'; Cardozo (yellow card) 39'; Villon 45'	Stadium: Lake Forest Sports Park - Grass Field; Referee: Reyna Fonseca

September 22 (Note: After losing its first-round qualifying match to Cal FC, San Nicolás FC filed a protest with U.S. Soccer, claiming Cal FC was ineligible for the tournament. Cal FC went on hiatus in 2016, and returned to league play in the United Premier Soccer League (UPSL) for the fall 2018 season, with its first match on September 16. This fact taken by itself would mean that Cal FC was not a playing member of its league in good standing on August 13, 2018, as required by the tournament rules. However, while on hiatus, Cal FC merged with LA Roma, which participated in the UPSL during the fall 2017 season, which made the merged club, branded under the Cal FC name, a playing member of the UPSL in good standing on August 13, 2018. Based on the merged club's eligibility acquired through LA Roma's league participation, U.S. Soccer denied the protest.)	Cal FC (California)	3–1	(California) San Nicolás FC	Calabasas, California
19:30 PT	Alfaro 9', 27'; Hernandez 50' (yellow card) 44'; Alewine (yellow card) 56'	Report	Miranda 31' (yellow card) 56'; Canale (yellow card) 34' (yellow-red card) 46'; Rivera (yellow card) 47'	Stadium: Calabasas High School; Referee: Osvaldo Delgado-Landeros

September 23	Buena Park FC (California)	4–0	(California) Valley United SC	La Palma, California
15:00 PT	Da Rosa 11' (pen.), 62'; Young 64'; Somico 66'; Funes (yellow card) 84'	Report	Martinez (yellow card) 12'; Rodarte (yellow card) 24'; P. Garcia (yellow card) 88'	Stadium: Kennedy High School - Varsity Field; Referee: Julio Carranza

September 23	Real Sociedad Royals (California)	4–0	(California) Quickening	Bellflower, California
16:00 PT	Aguirre 19'; Rake (yellow card) 40'; Poggio 48'; Busatto 66'; Arceo 90'	Report	Roque (yellow card) 38'	Stadium: St. John Bosco High School - Stadium Field; Referee: Israel Fernandez

September 23	Lionside FC (California)	2–0	(California) SC Trojans FC	Lake Forest, California
19:00 PT	Geddes 36', 86'	Report		Stadium: Lake Forest Sports Park; Referee: Denis Vargas

September 23	Outbreak FC (California)	2–1	(California) LA South Bay Monsters FC	Irvine, California
19:15 PT	Aguero (yellow card) 38'; Bagheri 41' (yellow card) 70'; Edwards 60'; Irei (yellow card) 75'	Report	Villegas 22'; Ramos (yellow card) 64'	Stadium: Orange County Great Park - Field 18; Referee: Alfredo Sandoval-Victorio

Notes:

Received bye to second round of qualification:

- (California) Chula Vista FC

==== West Region ====
September 22	Academica SC (California)	4–1	(California) Davis Legacy Soccer Club	Turlock, California
19:00 PT	Plascencia 4'; Sousa (yellow card) 60'; Gutierrez (yellow card) 62'; Esparza 64'; Ceja 77', 78' (yellow card) 70'	Report	Skvarna 50'; Lopez (yellow card) 67'; Nagle (yellow card) 70'	Stadium: Academica Fields - East Field; Referee: Lee Hulsey

September 22	Oakland FC Leopards (California)	0–1	(California) Oakland Stompers	San Leandro, California
19:00 PT	Littleton (yellow card) 16'; Castro (yellow card) 23' (red card) 87'; Bent (yellow card) 26'; Middlemiss (yellow card) 42'; Irwin (yellow card) 60'	Report	Arramdani (yellow card) 55'; Garcia 78'; Hernandez-Butron (yellow card) 84'; Hakim (yellow card) 89'	Stadium: Burrell Field; Referee: Riley Young

September 22	San Ramon Dynamos FC (California)	0–7	(California) JASA RWC	San Ramon, California
19:00 PT		Report	Vazquez-Flores 17', 47'; Masch (yellow card) 34'; Mitchell 35'; Herrera 67'; Angell (yellow card) 71'; Uche 83', 89'; Huffer 85'	Stadium: Dougherty Valley High School; Referee: Jonathan Miras

Received bye to second round of qualification:

- (California) Contra Costa FC
- (Oregon) IPS/Marathon Taverna
- (California) Napa Sporting SC
- Nevada Coyotes FC
- (California) Real San Jose

=== Second qualifying round ===
The second qualifying round matches were played on October 20 and 21, with the exception of one that was postponed until November 11, due to flooding.

==== Northeast Region ====
October 20	Kendall Wanderers (Massachusetts)	0–1	(Massachusetts) GPS Omens	Cambridge, Massachusetts
12:00 ET	Bridges (yellow card) 28'	Report	Murray 73'	Stadium: Danehy Park - Field 3 Referee: Michael Dee

October 20	Safira FC (Massachusetts)	4–1	(Massachusetts) Boston City FC II	Somerville, Massachusetts
19:00 ET	Lage-Silva (yellow card) 24'; Teixeira 28'; Lima De Melo (yellow card) 45'; Guimaraes 80'; Bellettini 86'; Vidal 88'	Report	Marcal (yellow card) 32'; Rincon-Gonzalez (yellow card) 35'; Nascimento-Batista 67'; Lobo-Cunha (red card) 82'	Stadium: Dilboy Stadium; Referee: Dusan Basta

October 20	Jackson Lions FC (New Jersey)	0–0 (a.e.t.) (1–3 p)	(New York (state)) New York Pancyprian-Freedoms	Jackson Township, New Jersey
19:30 ET	Avalos (yellow card) 26'; Casey (yellow card) 49'; Fryc (yellow card) 65'	USSF Report; TheCup.US Report	Onisiforou (yellow card) 111'; Andreou (red card) 119'	Stadium: Jackson Justice Complex - Soccer Turf Field; Referee: Joshua Encarnacion
	Penalties
	Bond (penalty scored)		(penalty scored) Iosifidis; (penalty scored) Matteo; (penalty scored) Tsoukriel

October 21	Ukrainian Nationals (Pennsylvania)	0–3	(Pennsylvania) West Chester Predators	North Wales, Pennsylvania
14:30 ET	Georges (yellow card) 10' (yellow-red card) 34'; Ross (yellow card) 26'; Dell'Arciprete (red card) 83'	USSF Report; Brotherly Game Report	Osborne (yellow card) 29'; Martyn 31'; Nolan 56'; Wilson 65'; Greer (yellow card) 83'	Stadium: Ukrainian American Sports Center - Field 1 Referee: Luis Arroyo

==== Mid-Atlantic Region ====
October 20	Cville Alliance FC - Reserves (Virginia)	0–6	(Maryland) World Class Premier Elite FC	Charlottesville, Virginia
18:00 ET		Report	Joe 13'; Sesay 38'; Houapeu 46', 69'; Blystone 75'; Pato 90'	Stadium: St. Anne's-Belfield School; Referee: Nick Creasey

October 21	Christos FC (Maryland)	6–0	(Maryland) Aegean Hawks	Elkridge, Maryland
15:00 ET	A. Lee 22', 87'; Rudy (yellow card) 41'; Caringi III 44', 65', 67', 84'	Report		Stadium: Troy Park - Field 2 Referee: Evan Horne

October 21	Rochester Lancers 2 (Note: The Rochester River Dogz changed the club's name to Rochester Lancers 2 prior to the second round of qualifying.) (New York (state))	0–0 (a.e.t.) (4–3 p)	(Pennsylvania) Tartan Devils Oak Avalon	Rochester, New York
15:00 ET		USSF Report; Pittsburgh Soccer Now Report		Stadium: Roberts Wesleyan College; Referee: Daniel Simich
	Penalties
	Francis (penalty scored); Mitrevski (penalty scored); Rozzano (penalty scored); Schindler (penalty scored)		(penalty scored) Heuler; (penalty scored) Shaffer; (penalty scored) Vincent

October 21	Virginia United	2–0	(Maryland) Super Delegates Football Club	Manassas, Virginia
19:00 ET	Cartagena 5'; Otero 60'; Flott (yellow card) 70'	Report	Muluya (yellow card) 47'; Fonbod (yellow card) 85'; Muwud (yellow card) 89'	Stadium: Howison Homestead Soccer Complex - Field 1 Referee: Patrick McFall

==== Southeast Region ====
October 20	Sporting Orlando Soccer Club (Florida)	0–4	(Florida) Hurricane FC	Davenport, Florida
19:00 ET	Venancio (yellow card) 83'	Report	Astudilo 35', 80'; Black (yellow card) 45'; De Lacerda 59', 71'; Tavares (yellow card) 70'	Stadium: Northeast Regional Park – Field 3

October 20	America Soccer Club (Florida)	2–1	(Florida) Central Florida FC Spartans	Winter Garden, Florida
20:30 ET	Allen (yellow card) 22'; Flemmings (yellow card) 37'; Avila De Melo (yellow card) 45'; Tobias 50'; Eyang 74'	Report	Harvey (yellow card) 3'; Murphy 30'; Bezer (yellow card) 58'; Adewunmi (yellow card) 59'; Wood (yellow card) 67'	Stadium: West Orange High School; Referee: Esteban Rosano

October 21	Soda City FC Sorinex (South Carolina)	4–2	(Georgia (U.S. state)) Shahin Atlanta FC	Columbia, South Carolina
19:15 ET	N. Jaramillo 16'; Smith 89' (yellow card) 22'; 29' (o.g.); Bareket (yellow card) 42'; Jermstad 64'	Report	Hernandez-Huerta 22'; Nyirabu-Mohabe (yellow card) 32'; Moshood (yellow card) 35'; M. Ruzayev 50'; Vivanco (yellow card) 53'; Naraghi (yellow card) 85'	Stadium: Lexington County Soccer Complex - Field 10; Referee: Howard Ash

October 21	Florida Soccer Soldiers	1–0	(Florida) Red Force FC	Miami, Florida
20:30 ET	Sabella 74' (yellow card) 44'; Suazo-Williams (yellow card) 54'; Castillo-Delgado (red card) 68'	USSF Report; Magic City Soccer Report	Compos-Coro (yellow card) 44'; Murillo (yellow card) 54'; Salinas (yellow card) 54'; Fernandes (red card) 59'; Gordon (yellow card) 80'; Mendoza (yellow card) 88'	Stadium: Tropical Park; Attendance: 125; Referee: Alejo Calume

==== Central Region ====
October 20	Leon FC (Texas)	0–2	(Texas) NTX Rayados	Plano, Texas
8:30 CT		USSF Report; TheCup.US Report	Salas 42'; Pfluger (yellow card) 83'; Rodriguez 89'	Stadium: John Paul II High School (Note: NTX Rayados was originally scheduled to be the home team, but the venue it selected was unplayable due to heavy rain. Consequently, Leon FC was designated the home team, and it selected this venue for the match.); Referee: Shane McCullough

October 20	FC Maritsa (Missouri)	4–3	(Minnesota) FC Minnesota	St Louis, Missouri
19:00 CT	Hitchcock 5'; Junqueira 24'; Campara (yellow card) 57'; Alihodzic 70'; Almeida 90+2'; Cojocov (yellow card) 90+2'	USSF Report; E Pluribus Loonum Report	Bottum 23'; J. Oliver 38', 88' (pen.); Young (yellow card) 52'; McClain (yellow card) 55'; Garcia (red card) 86'	Stadium: Parkway North High School - Varsity Field; Referee: Matt Geringer

October 21	Aurora Borealis Soccer Club (Illinois)	0–4	(Michigan) Livonia City FC	Mooseheart, Illinois
16:00 CT	Lewis (yellow card) 40'	Report	Bechard 24'; Cameron 43', 53'; C. Cole (yellow card) 62'; Lightner 86'	Stadium: Ohio Moose Sports Complex; Referee: Carlos Rodriguez

November 11 (Note: Match was postponed from originally scheduled date due to flooding.)	Celtic Cowboys Premier (Texas)	2–3	(Louisiana) Motagua New Orleans	Round Rock, Texas
15:00 CT	Wright 57' (yellow card) 57'; Fleming (yellow card) 58'; Peoples 88'	USSF Report; TheCup.US Report	Chagnard 31', 69'; Morris 71'; Peralta (yellow card) 90'	Stadium: Round Rock Multipurpose Complex – Field 1 Referee: Elton Garcia

==== Mountain Region ====
October 21	Sporting AZ FC (Arizona)	1–4	(Texas) Southwest FC	Phoenix, Arizona
13:00 MT	Weber (red card) 18'; Castillo 33'; Aguilar-Bolanos (yellow card) 44'; Papa (yellow card) 45' (yellow-red card) 82'; Guse (yellow card) 68'	Report	Chavez 3'; Garcia 90+1' (yellow card) 44'; Ramirez 67' (yellow card) 70'; Morales 90+2'	Stadium: South Mountain Community College; Referee: Mario Coss

October 21	FC Denver (Colorado)	1–1 (a.e.t.) (3–2 p)	(Colorado) Harpo's FC	Aurora, Colorado
13:30 MT	Jacobson (yellow card) 33'; Castillo (yellow card) 50'; Hudson (yellow card) 70'; Odulate 73'	Report	Amann 46'; Mejia (yellow card) 55'; Salvaggione (yellow card) 120'	Stadium: Aurora Sports Park - Field 1 Referee: Oscar Arias
	Penalties
	Castillo (penalty scored); Hogan (penalty scored); Jacobson (penalty scored)		(penalty scored) Campbell; (penalty scored) Salvaggione

October 21	Colorado Rovers (Colorado)	2–4	(Colorado) Gam United Football Club	Broomfield, Colorado
15:00 MT	Hunt 9'; Hutchinson 18'; Thompson (yellow card) 23'; Adam (yellow card) 76'; Safadi (yellow card) 79'	Report	P. Goma (yellow card) 17'; Sarpong 66'; Boakye 71', 88'; B. Goma (yellow card) 76'; Hissein 85' (pen.)	Stadium: Broomfield Commons - Championship Turf; Referee: Miguel Urbina-Barrios

October 21	Boise Cutthroats FC (Idaho)	3–4 (a.e.t.)	(Utah) San Juan FC	Boise, Idaho
15:00 MT	Fox 26' (pen.), 67'; Vivar-Diaz 47'; Naylor (yellow card) 49'; Mollay (yellow card) 89'	Report	Velazco 55' (yellow card) 91'; Munoz 59'; Caparelli 90+2'; Yong-Sam 106'	Stadium: Boise State Recreational Field; Referee: Adam Sanchez

==== Southern California Region ====
October 20	Lionside FC (California)	0–5	(California) Santa Ana Winds FC	Lake Forest, California
19:00 PT	Omenai (red card) 28'	Report	Martinez (yellow card) 24'; Ca. Torres 32'; Gorman (red card) 37'; Cornoa 43'; Estrada 62', 89'; Quintero 78'	Stadium: Lake Forest Sports Park - Field A Referee: Ricardo Fierro

October 20	Outbreak FC (California)	1–6	(California) Cal FC	Irvine, California
19:15 PT	Murphy 54'; Kolano (yellow card) 80'	Report	Parra 13', 78'; Alfaro 26', 86'; Hernández 35'; Lomeli 40'	Stadium: Orange County Great Park - Field 18; Referee: Israel Fernandez

October 21	Buena Park FC (California)	2–1	(California) Real Sociedad Royals	La Palma, California
15:00 PT	Saglimbeni (yellow card) 34'; Locken 40'; Glascock (yellow card) 51'; Young 62'	Report	Busatto 32'; Harris (yellow card) 45'	Stadium: Kennedy High School - Varsity Field; Referee: Brandon Stevis

October 21	California United FC II	2–0	(California) Chula Vista FC	Irvine, California
19:00 PT	Cardozo 31'; De la Fuente (yellow card) 58'; Coronado (yellow card) 59'; Villalobos-Carbajal 72'; Sanchez-Rincon (yellow card) 89'	USSF Report; TheCup.US Report	Cuevas (yellow card) 89'	Stadium: Orange County Great Park - Field 2 Referee: Joseph Salinas

==== West Region ====
October 20	JASA RWC (California)	3–1	(California) Napa Sporting SC	Redwood City, California
18:00 PT	Masch 20', 53'; Vazquez-Flores (yellow card) 51'; E. Angell (yellow card) 72'; Garcia-Valencia (red card) 83'; Huffer 88'	Report	Chavez (yellow card) 45'; Marin-Velasco 58' (yellow card) 61' (yellow-red card) 83'; Arroyo (red card) 83'	Stadium: Sequoia High School - Stadium Field; Referee: Bryan Juarez

October 20	Academica SC (California)	3–2	(California) Contra Costa FC	Turlock, California
19:00 PT	Villegas 35', 44'; Cazares 59'	Report	Castillo (yellow card) 15'; Bob 60'; Alejandro 62' (pen.)	Stadium: Academica Fields - East Field; Referee: Mike Pirone

October 20	Oakland Stompers (California)	2–0	(California) Real San Jose	Oakland, California
19:30 PT	Nuño 40', 60'; Mahic (yellow card) 41'	Report	Kothari (yellow card) 62'; Ettefagh (yellow card) 65'	Stadium: Raimondi Park; Referee: Elijio Arreguin

October 21	IPS/Marathon Taverna (Oregon)	5–4	(Nevada) Nevada Coyotes FC	Portland, Oregon
19:00 PT	Pogue 17', 18'; Saydee 37', 81'; Hernandez-Tavera (yellow card) 49'; Thomas 58'; Wettach-Glosser (yellow card) 61'	Report	Jatta 90' (yellow card) 20'; Echeverria (yellow card) 24'; Navarro-Romero 28'; Toland 43'; Crim 60'; Chinchilla (yellow card) 85'	Stadium: Rob Strasser Memorial Field #8; Referee: Mike Hohnholz

=== Third qualifying round ===
The third qualifying round matches were played on November 17 and 18. Three matches were postponed to a later date. One match was suspended while the two teams were tied, and will be replayed January 16.

==== Northeast Region ====
November 17	GPS Omens (Massachusetts)	2–2 (a.e.t.) (6–7 p)	(Massachusetts) Safira FC	Boston, Massachusetts
10:00 ET	Defregger 10', 73'	Report	Bellettini 30'; Vidal 90'	Stadium: Rotch Field; Referee: Thomas Snyder

November 17	New York Pancyprian-Freedoms (New York (state))	0–3	(Pennsylvania) West Chester Predators	Jamaica, New York
19:30 ET		Report	Greer 38'; Poarch 43'; Bartosinski 74'	Stadium: St. John's University; Referee: Ernie Constantine

==== Mid-Atlantic Region ====
November 18	Rochester Lancers 2 (New York (state))	1–3	(Maryland) World Class Premier Elite FC	Rochester, New York
13:00 ET	Rozzano 72'	Report	Joe 11'; Ankrah 45', 90'	Stadium: Roberts Wesleyan College; Referee: Ryan Trombetta

November 18	Virginia United	2–1	(Maryland) Christos FC	Manassas, Virginia
17:00 ET	Martinez Campos 8', 85'	Report	Baxter 32'	Stadium: Howison Homestead Soccer Complex - Field 1 Referee: JT Alukonis

==== Southeast Region ====
November 17	America Soccer Club (Florida)	2–1	(South Carolina) Soda City FC Sorinex	Winter Garden, Florida
20:30 ET	Tobias 27'; Eyang 44'	Report	Bareket 12'	Stadium: West Orange High School; Referee: Miguel Martes

November 18	Hurricane FC (Florida)	0–6	Florida Soccer Soldiers	Delray Beach, Florida
18:00 ET		Report	Meneses 3'; Morles 18'; Stamatis 43', 54'; Sabella 78', 80'	Stadium: Seacrest Soccer Complex - Field 1 Referee: Juan Pablo Casas

==== Central Region ====
November 17	Livonia City FC (Michigan)	0-0 (a.e.t.) (5–6 p)	(Missouri) FC Maritsa	Wixom, Michigan
20:00 ET		Report		Stadium: Total Sports Complex - Old Trafford; Referee: Jacob Little

January 12, 2019	Motagua New Orleans (Louisiana)	1-1 (a.e.t.) (9-10 p)	(Texas) NTX Rayados	New Orleans, Louisiana
19:00 CT	Morris 79'	Report	Rodriguez 36'	Stadium: Pan-American Stadium; Referee: Alex Connelly

==== Mountain Region ====
November 17	Southwest FC (Texas)	3–0	(Utah) San Juan FC	El Paso, Texas
19:30 MT	Sosa 2'; Lopez-Molinar 34'; Ramirez 64'	Report		Stadium: Pebble Hills High School; Referee: Manuel Vargas

December 2	FC Denver (Colorado)	4–1	(Colorado) Gam United Football Club	Aurora, Colorado
18:00 MT	Bernhardt 8'; Magallanes 23'; Castillo 27'; Lister 78'	Report	Sarpong 40'	Stadium: Aurora Sports Park - Field 1 Referee: Chris Greer

==== Southern California Region ====
November 17	Santa Ana Winds FC (California)	3–2 (a.e.t.)	(California) Buena Park FC	Lake Forest, California
19:00 PT	30' (o.g.); Rico 92'; Corona 108'	Report	Da Rosa 12'; Carlson 113'	Stadium: Lake Forest Sports Park - Field A Referee: Samantha Martinez

November 18	Cal FC (California)	2–2 (Note: The game was not played out in its entirety and will be replayed on January 16 at 7 PM)	California United FC II	Thousand Oaks, California
19:30 PT	Parra 3', 11'		Klute 37'; Moreno 42'	Stadium: Cal Lutheran University; Referee: Brandon Stevis

January 16, 2019	Cal FC (California)	1–1 (a.e.t.) (7-6 p)	(California) California United FC II	Thousand Oaks, California
19:00 PT	Wbias 7'	Report	Moreno 83'	Stadium: Cal Lutheran University; Referee: Mark Allatin

==== West Region ====
January 5, 2019	Oakland Stompers (California)	0–1	(California) Academica SC	Oakland, California
19:30 PT		Report	Ceja 79'	Stadium: Raimondi Park; Referee: Turan Ozdemir

November 18	IPS/Marathon Taverna (Oregon)	3–2	(California) JASA RWC	Portland, Oregon
19:00 PT	Capuia 34'; Hernandez-Tavera 53'; Thomas 54'	Report	Huffer 61', 70'	Stadium: Buckman Field Park; Referee: Andrew Marihart

=== Fourth qualifying round ===
The fourth qualifying round matches were played on April 6 and 7. The game between Florida Soccer Soldiers and America Soccer Club, originally scheduled for April 7, was cancelled and awarded to Florida after America SC was disqualified from the tournament for leaving the United Premier Soccer League (UPSL).

==== Northeast Region ====
April 6	Safira FC (Massachusetts)	0–3	(Pennsylvania) West Chester Predators	Somerville, Massachusetts
20:00 ET		Report	Poarch 45+'; Nolan 57'; Nolan 60'	Stadium: Dilboy Stadium; Referee: Adam Kilpatrick

==== Mid-Atlantic Region ====
April 7	Virginia United	2–2 (a.e.t.) (5–4 p)	(Maryland) World Class Premier Elite FC	Woodbridge, Virginia
16:00 ET		Report		Stadium: Howinson Homestead Soccer Complex (Field 3); Referee: Patrick McFall

==== Southeast Region ====
April 7	Florida Soccer Soldiers	Forfeit; 1–0	(Florida) America Soccer Club	Miami, Florida
16:00 ET		Report		Stadium: Tropical Park; Referee: Alejo Calume

==== Central Region ====
April 6	NTX Rayados (Texas)	5–0	(Missouri) FC Maritsa	Dallas, Texas
19:00 CT	Lara 23', 67', 83'; Martinez 70'; Fazio 87'	Report		Stadium: Mountain View College Soccer Fields; Referee: Fevzi Demirhan

==== Mountain Region ====
April 6	Southwest FC (Texas)	3–4 (a.e.t.)	(Colorado) FC Denver	El Paso, Texas
TBD CT	Gomez 28'; Lopez 30'; Morales 44'	Report	Jacobson 45+'; Salta 70'; Chauncey 78'; Castillo 103'	Stadium: Pebble Hills High School; Referee: Marco Vega

==== Southern California Region ====
April 7	Santa Ana Winds FC (California)	1–4	(California) Cal FC	Lake Forest, California
19:00 PT	Gorman 56'	Report	Alfaro 17', 48'; Lomeli 66'; Barouch 70'	Stadium: Lake Forest Sports Park (Field A); Referee: Anthony Almeida

==== West Region ====
April 6	Academica SC (California)	3–3 (a.e.t.) (3–1 p)	(Oregon) IPS/Marathon Taverna	Turlock, California
19:00 PT	Canfield 90'; Villegas 90+5'; Cazares 120+4'	Report	Pogue 37'; Mejia 69'; Atanasov 98'	Stadium: Academica Fields - East Field; Referee: Nicholas Marin
	Penalties
	Bridges (penalty scored); Rodriguez (penalty missed); Ceja (penalty scored); Carmoa (penalty scored)		(penalty missed) Gorillot; (penalty missed) Romac; (penalty missed) Capuia

=== Top goalscorers ===
Team eliminated for this round.

Rank	Player	Team	Goals	By round			
Rank	Player	Team	Goals	Q1	Q2	Q3	Q4
1	(United States) Pete Caringi III	Christos FC	8	4	4	0	
2	(United States) German Alfaro	Cal FC	6	2	2	0	2
3	(United States) Jordan Gorman	Santa Ana Winds FC	4	3	0	0	1
3	(Ivory Coast) Levi Houapeu	World Class Premier Elite FC	4	2	2	0	0
3	(United States) James Huffer	JASA RWC	4	1	1	2	
3	(United States) Valentin Sabella	Florida Soccer Soldiers	4	1	1	2	0
3	(United States) Gustavo Villalobos	California United FC II	4	3	1	0	
7	(United States) Daniel Ankrah	World Class Premier Elite FC	3	1	0	2	0
7	(United States) Ramiro Ceja	Academica SC	3	2	0	1	0
7	(United States) Brandon Chagnard	Motagua New Orleans	3	1	2	0	
7	(United States) Nathan Da Rosa	Buena Park FC	3	2	0	1	
7	Pablo Guimaraes	Safira FC	3	2	1	0	0
7	John Nolan	West Chester Predators	3	0	1	0	2
7	Nathaniel Pogue	IPS/Marathon Taverna	3	0	2	0	1
7	Dean Smith	Soda City FC Sorinex	3	2	1	0	
7	Manuel Villegas Jr	Academica SC	3	0	2	0	1

== See also ==
- 2018 NPSL season
- 2018 PDL season
