= 2017 U.S. Open Cup =

104th edition of cup competition in American soccer

2017 Lamar Hunt U.S. Open Cup
Tournament details
- Country: United States
- Teams: 99

Final positions
- Champions: Sporting Kansas City (4th title)
- Runners-up: New York Red Bulls
- 2019 CONCACAF Champions League: Sporting Kansas City

Tournament statistics
- Matches played: 92
- Goals scored: 286 (3.11 per match)
- Top goal scorer(s): Djiby Fall; Stefano Pinho; Bradley Wright-Phillips (4 goals each)

The 2017 Lamar Hunt U.S. Open Cup was the 104th edition of the oldest ongoing competition in American soccer.

FC Dallas entered the competition as the defending champions, but were eliminated in the quarterfinals by Sporting Kansas City. First round matchups were announced April 12, and matches began May 9.

The cash prize amounts were the same as those in the 2016 tournament, with the champion receiving $250,000 and the runner-up $60,000. The team from each lower division that advanced the furthest received $15,000.

== Qualification ==
Qualification for the Open Cup began in September 2016 with lower league play-in ties. NPSL team Minneapolis City SC was disqualified before the start of the tournament after the club changed leagues during the qualification process.

Enter in First Round (Open Division)		Enter in Second Round (Second Division)	Enter in Fourth Round (First Division)
Local Qualifiers; 17 teams	NPSL/PDL; 18 teams/21 teams	NASL/USL; 6 teams/18 teams	MLS; 19 teams
Anahuac FC; Azteca FC; Boca Raton Football Club; Christos FC^{$}; Chula Vista FC; Colorado Rush; El Farolito; FC Motown; GPS Omens; Junior Lone Star FC; La Máquina; LA Wolves FC; Moreno Valley FC; NTX Rayados; Outbreak FC; Red Force FC; Tartan Devils Oak Avalon	NPSL: AFC Ann Arbor; AFC Cleveland; Albion SC Pros; Atlanta Silverbacks; Boston City FC; Chattanooga FC; Clarkstown SC Eagles; FC Wichita; Fredericksburg FC; Grand Rapids FC; Houston Dutch Lions FC; Jacksonville Armada U-23; Legacy 76; Miami United FC; New Jersey Copa FC; OSA FC; Sonoma County Sol; Tulsa Athletic; PDL: Burlingame Dragons; Carolina Dynamo; Charlotte Eagles; Chicago FC United; Derby City Rovers; Des Moines Menace; FC Golden State Force; FC Tucson; Fresno Fuego; GPS Portland Phoenix; Michigan Bucks; Ocean City Nor’easters; OKC Energy U23; Reading United AC; San Diego Zest; SC United Bantams; Seattle Sounders FC U-23; South Florida Surf; The Villages SC; Ventura County Fusion; Western Mass Pioneers	NASL: Indy Eleven; Jacksonville Armada FC; Miami FC; New York Cosmos; North Carolina FC; San Francisco Deltas; USL: Charleston Battery; Charlotte Independence; Colorado Springs Switchbacks FC; FC Cincinnati^{$}; Harrisburg City Islanders; Louisville City FC; Oklahoma City Energy FC; Orange County SC; Phoenix Rising FC; Pittsburgh Riverhounds; Reno 1868 FC; Richmond Kickers; Rochester Rhinos; Sacramento Republic FC; Saint Louis FC; San Antonio FC; Tampa Bay Rowdies; Tulsa Roughnecks FC	Atlanta United FC; Chicago Fire; Colorado Rapids; Columbus Crew SC; D.C. United; FC Dallas; Houston Dynamo; LA Galaxy; Minnesota United FC; New England Revolution; New York City FC; New York Red Bulls^{$$}; Orlando City SC; Philadelphia Union; Portland Timbers; Real Salt Lake; San Jose Earthquakes; Seattle Sounders FC; Sporting Kansas City^{$$$}

- $: Winner of $15,000 bonus for advancing the furthest in the competition from their respective divisions.
- $$: Winner of $60,000 for being the runner-up in the competition.
- $$$: Winner of $250,000 for winning the competition.

== Brackets ==
First Round; May 9–12
NPSL	New Jersey Copa FC	1
**LQ**	**FC Motown**	**2***
PDL	Western Mass Pioneers	2(4)
**NPSL**	**Boston City FC**	**2(5)**
PDL	GPS Portland Phoenix	0
**LQ**	**GPS Omens**	**2**
**PDL**	**Reading United AC**	**1**
NPSL	Clarkstown SC Eagles	0
**PDL**	**Ocean City Nor’easters**	**3**
LQ	Junior Lone Star FC	1
**PDL**	**Carolina Dynamo**	**2**
NPSL	Legacy 76	1
**PDL**	**Charlotte Eagles**	**2**
NPSL	Chattanooga FC	0
**NPSL**	**Miami United FC**	**2**
LQ	Boca Raton Football Club	1
**NPSL**	**Atlanta Silverbacks**	**4**
PDL	SC United Bantams	1
LQ	Red Force FC	2
**PDL**	**South Florida Surf**	**4**
**NPSL**	**Jacksonville Armada U-23**	**2**
PDL	The Villages SC	1
**PDL**	**Chicago FC United**	**1**
NPSL	Grand Rapids FC	0
NPSL	Fredericksburg FC	0
**LQ**	**Christos FC**	**3**
PDL	Des Moines Menace	1
**NPSL**	**AFC Cleveland**	**3**
PDL	Derby City Rovers	1(3)
**LQ**	**Tartan Devils Oak Avalon**	**1(4)**
**PDL**	**Michigan Bucks**	**1**
NPSL	AFC Ann Arbor	0
**NPSL**	**FC Wichita**	**1***
LQ	Azteca FC	0
NPSL	Tulsa Athletic	1(2)
**PDL**	**OKC Energy U23**	**1(4)**
**NPSL**	**Houston Dutch Lions FC**	**3**
LQ	NTX Rayados	1
**PDL**	**FC Tucson**	**3**
LQ	Colorado Rush	1
PDL	Ventura County Fusion	1
**LQ**	**Moreno Valley Fútbol Club**	**2**
**PDL**	**Fresno Fuego**	**4**
LQ	La Máquina	1
LQ	El Farolito	0(5)
**PDL**	**Burlingame Dragons**	**0(6)**
**LQ**	**LA Wolves FC**	**4**
PDL	San Diego Zest	2
NPSL	Albion SC Pros	2
**LQ**	**Chula Vista FC**	**3**
**PDL**	**FC Golden State Force**	**2**
LQ	Outbreak FC	0
NPSL	Sonoma County Sol	1(4)
**LQ**	**Anahuac FC**	**1(5)**
**NPSL**	**OSA FC**	**0(5)**
PDL	Seattle Sounders FC U-23	0(3)

Second Round; May 16–17
**USL**	**Rochester Rhinos**	**3**
LQ	FC Motown	0
NPSL	Boston City FC	1
**LQ**	**GPS Omens**	**2**
**PDL**	**Reading United AC**	**3**
NASL	New York Cosmos	2
PDL	Ocean City Nor’easters	0(5)
**USL**	**Harrisburg City Islanders**	**0(6)**
PDL	Carolina Dynamo	1
**NASL**	**North Carolina FC**	**6**
PDL	Charlotte Eagles	2
**USL**	**Charlotte Independence**	**3**
NPSL	Miami United FC	1
**NASL**	**Jacksonville Armada FC**	**2**
NPSL	Atlanta Silverbacks	1
**USL**	**Charleston Battery**	**2**
**NASL**	**Miami FC**	**3**
PDL	South Florida Surf	2
**USL**	**Tampa Bay Rowdies**	**3**
NPSL	Jacksonville Armada U-23	0
**PDL**	**Chicago FC United**	**3**
USL	Pittsburgh Riverhounds	1
USL	Richmond Kickers	0
**LQ**	**Christos FC**	**1**
**USL**	**FC Cincinnati**	**1***
NPSL	AFC Cleveland	0
LQ	Tartan Devils Oak Avalon	0
**USL**	**Louisville City FC**	**9**
**PDL**	**Michigan Bucks**	**1**
NASL	Indy Eleven	0
NPSL	FC Wichita	3
**USL**	**Saint Louis FC**	**4***
**USL**	**Tulsa Roughnecks FC**	**5**
PDL	OKC Energy U23	3
NPSL	Houston Dutch Lions FC	1
**USL**	**San Antonio FC**	**2**
**USL**	**Colorado Springs Switchbacks FC**	**2**
PDL	FC Tucson	0
**USL**	**Oklahoma City Energy FC**	**5**
LQ	Moreno Valley Fútbol Club	1
PDL	Fresno Fuego	1
**USL**	**Phoenix Rising FC**	**3**
**NASL**	**San Francisco Deltas**	**2**
PDL	Burlingame Dragons	1
**LQ**	**LA Wolves FC**	**1***
LQ	Chula Vista FC	0
PDL	FC Golden State Force	2
**USL**	**Orange County SC**	**5**
**USL**	**Sacramento Republic FC**	**4**
LQ	Anahuac FC	0
NPSL	OSA FC	1(3)
**USL**	**Reno 1868 FC**	**1(4)**

Third Round; May 30–31
**USL**	**Rochester Rhinos**	**2***
LQ	GPS Omens	1
PDL	Reading United AC	0
**USL**	**Harrisburg City Islanders**	**3**
**NASL**	**North Carolina FC**	**4**
USL	Charlotte Independence	1
NASL	Jacksonville Armada FC	0
**USL**	**Charleston Battery**	**1**
**NASL**	**Miami FC**	**2**
USL	Tampa Bay Rowdies	0
PDL	Chicago FC United	0
**LQ**	**Christos FC**	**1**
**USL**	**FC Cincinnati**	**1**
USL	Louisville City FC	0
PDL	Michigan Bucks	1
**USL**	**Saint Louis FC**	**2**
**USL**	**Tulsa Roughnecks FC**	**0(7)**
USL	San Antonio FC	0(6)
USL	Colorado Springs Switchbacks FC	1
**USL**	**Oklahoma City Energy FC**	**2**
USL	Phoenix Rising FC	1
**NASL**	**San Francisco Deltas**	**2**
LQ	LA Wolves FC	0
**USL**	**Orange County SC**	**1**
**USL**	**Sacramento Republic FC**	**2**
USL	Reno 1868 FC	0

Host team listed first
Bold = winner
* = after extra time, ( ) = penalty shootout score

Fourth Round; June 13–14
NASL	North Carolina FC	2
**MLS**	**Houston Dynamo**	**3***
**MLS**	**Sporting Kansas City**	**4**
MLS	Minnesota United FC	0
**MLS**	**FC Dallas**	**2**
USL	Tulsa Roughnecks FC	1
**MLS**	**Colorado Rapids**	**3**
USL	Oklahoma City Energy FC	2
**MLS**	**San Jose Earthquakes**	**2**
NASL	San Francisco Deltas	0
**MLS**	**Seattle Sounders FC**	**2**
MLS	Portland Timbers	1
**MLS**	**LA Galaxy**	**3**
USL	Orange County SC	1
**USL**	**Sacramento Republic FC**	**4**
MLS	Real Salt Lake	1
MLS	Orlando City SC	1
**NASL**	**Miami FC**	**3**
**MLS**	**Atlanta United FC**	**3**
USL	Charleston Battery	2
**USL**	**FC Cincinnati**	**1**
MLS	Columbus Crew SC	0
USL	Saint Louis FC	0
**MLS**	**Chicago Fire**	**1**
**MLS**	**New England Revolution**	**3**
USL	Rochester Rhinos	0
**MLS**	**D.C. United**	**4**
LQ	Christos FC	1
**MLS**	**New York Red Bulls**	**1**
MLS	New York City FC	0
**MLS**	**Philadelphia Union**	**3**
USL	Harrisburg City Islanders	1

Round of 16; June 27–28
MLS	Houston Dynamo	0
**MLS**	**Sporting Kansas City**	**2**
**MLS**	**FC Dallas**	**3**
MLS	Colorado Rapids	1
**MLS**	**San Jose Earthquakes**	**2**
MLS	Seattle Sounders FC	1
**MLS**	**LA Galaxy**	**2**
USL	Sacramento Republic FC	0
**NASL**	**Miami FC**	**3**
MLS	Atlanta United FC	2
**USL**	**FC Cincinnati**	**0(3)**
MLS	Chicago Fire	0(1)
**MLS**	**New England Revolution**	**2**
MLS	D.C. United	1
**MLS**	**New York Red Bulls**	**1(5)**
MLS	Philadelphia Union	1(3)

Quarterfinals; July 7–August 2
**MLS**	**Sporting Kansas City**	**3***
MLS	FC Dallas	0
**MLS**	**San Jose Earthquakes**	**3**
MLS	LA Galaxy	2
NASL	Miami FC	0
**USL**	**FC Cincinnati**	**1**
MLS	New England Revolution	0
**MLS**	**New York Red Bulls**	**1**

Semifinals; August 9–15
**MLS**	**Sporting Kansas City**	**1(5)**
MLS	San Jose Earthquakes	1(4)
USL	FC Cincinnati	2
**MLS**	**New York Red Bulls**	**3***

Final; September 20
**MLS**	**Sporting Kansas City**	**2**
MLS	New York Red Bulls	1

- Host team listed first
- **Bold** = winner
- * = after extra time, ( ) = penalty shootout score
1. ^{A} The hosting priority for the final, in order, is Sporting KC then New York Red Bulls then FC Cincinnati

== Match details ==
All times local to game site

=== First round ===
Draw announced May 18.

May 9	Red Force FC (LQ)	2–4	South Florida Surf (PDL)	Miami, Florida
8:30 PM EDT	Ruiz 40'; Salinas 84'	Report	Gonzalez 10'; Michaud 54', 76'; Farias 72'	Stadium: Tropical Park; Referee: Anya Voigt

May 10	Fredericksburg FC (NPSL)	0–3	Christos FC (LQ)	Fredericksburg, Virginia
5:00 PM EDT			Caringi 5', 46', 87'	Stadium: Battleground Stadium; Referee: JT Alukonis

May 10	Atlanta Silverbacks (NPSL)	4–1	SC United Bantams (PDL)	Atlanta, Georgia
3:30 PM EDT	Lansana 4'; McCaulay 20', 58'; Harlley 79'		Brown 79' (pen.)	Stadium: Atlanta Silverbacks Park; Referee: David Jaye

May 10	El Farolito (LQ)	0–0 (a.e.t.) (5–6 p)	Burlingame Dragons FC (PDL)	San Francisco, California
3:00 PM PDT				Stadium: Boxer Stadium; Referee: Elijio Arreguin

May 10	Western Mass Pioneers (PDL)	2–2 (a.e.t.) (6–7 p)	Boston City FC (NPSL)	Ludlow, Massachusetts
7:00 PM EDT	Gonsalves 50'; Burokas 92'	Report	Batista 77'; Herrera 106'	Stadium: Lusitano Stadium; Referee: Randall Kelley

May 10	New Jersey Copa FC (NPSL)	1–2 (a.e.t.)	FC Motown (LQ)	Holmdel, New Jersey
7:00 PM EDT	Campbell 26'	Report	Santiago 39'; Guman 109'	Stadium: Saint John Vianney High School; Referee: Luis Arroyo

May 10	Charlotte Eagles (PDL)	2–0	Chattanooga FC (NPSL)	Charlotte, North Carolina
7:00 PM EDT	Omondi 72'; Costa 89'	Report		Stadium: Charlotte Christian School; Referee: Dustin Thorne

May 10	Carolina Dynamo (PDL)	2–1	Legacy 76 (NPSL)	Browns Summit, North Carolina
7:00 PM EDT	Mecham 13'; Nyepon 57'	Report	Poelker 51'	Stadium: Macpherson Stadium; Referee: Patrick Schmidt

May 10	Miami United FC (NPSL)	2–1	Boca Raton Football Club (LQ)	Hialeah, Florida
7:00 PM EDT	Menza 7'; Calcagno 87'	Report	Bontempo 56'	Stadium: Ted Hendricks Stadium; Referee: Jorge Taborda

May 10	Jacksonville Armada U-23 (NPSL)	2–1	The Villages SC (PDL)	Jacksonville, Florida
7:00 PM EDT	Castellanos 65'; Grassmyer 89'	Report	Alves 1'	Stadium: Patton Park; Referee: Esteban Rosano

May 10	Ocean City Nor'easters (PDL)	3–1	Junior Lone Star FC (LQ)	Ocean City, New Jersey
7:30 PM EDT	Collishaw 4', 14'; Barrett 88'	Report	N'Guessen 67'	Stadium: Carey Stadium; Referee: Tyler Wyrostek

May 10	Reading United AC (PDL)	1–0	Clarkstown SC Eagles (NPSL)	Reading, Pennsylvania
7:30 PM EDT	Pierrot 45+8'	Report		Stadium: Exeter Township Senior High School; Referee: Melvin Holmes II

May 10	Michigan Bucks (PDL)	1–0	AFC Ann Arbor (NPSL)	Pontiac, Michigan
7:30 PM EDT	Landell 13'	Report		Stadium: Ultimate Soccer Arenas; Referee: Donovan Noocha

May 10	Derby City Rovers (PDL)	1–1 (3–4 p)	Tartan Devils Oak Avalon (LQ)	Jeffersonville, Indiana
7:30 PM EDT	Ibrahimkadic 11'	Report	Hueler 90'	Stadium: Woehrle Athletic Complex; Referee: Joshua Kelley

May 10	GPS Portland Phoenix (PDL)	0–2	GPS Omens (LQ)	Portland, Maine
8:00 PM EDT			Johnson; Shulevs 25'	Stadium: Memorial Field; Referee: Michael Dee

May 10	Dutch Lions FC (NPSL)	3–1	NTX Rayados (LQ)	Conroe, Texas
7:00 CDT	Olayimika 53'; Pablo 54'; Jerry 90'	Report	TBD 60' (o.g.)	Stadium: Dutch Lions FC Soccer Facility; Referee: Christopher Scruggs

May 10	FC Wichita (NPSL)	1–0 (a.e.t.)	Azteca FC (LQ)	Wichita, Kansas
7:00 PM CDT	Pittman 104'	Report		Stadium: Hoyt Athletic Field; Referee: Ricardo Gutierrez

May 10	Des Moines Menace (PDL)	1–3	AFC Cleveland (NPSL)	West Des Moines, Iowa
7:30 PM CDT	Patain 85'	Report	Suljevic 78' (pen.); Cvecko 90'; Klochko 90+'	Stadium: Valley Stadium; Referee: Robert Sorey

May 10	Tulsa Athletic (NPSL)	1–1 (a.e.t.) (2–4 p)	Oklahoma City Energy U23 (PDL)	Tulsa, Oklahoma
7:30 PM CDT	Fitzgerald 80'	Report	Puig 44'	Stadium: Hurricane Soccer & Track Stadium; Referee: Travis Haight

May 10	Sonoma County Sol (NPSL)	1–1 (a.e.t.) (4–5 p)	Anahuac FC (LQ)	Petaluma, California
7:30 PM CDT	Barragan 100'		TBD 106'	Stadium: Casa Grande High School; Referee: Alex Marquand-Willse

May 10	Albion SC Pros (NPSL)	2–3	Chula Vista FC (LQ)	San Diego, California
7:00 PM PDT	Oliveira 79' (pen.); Hayes 90'	Report	Diaz 74'; Verdin 88'; Hernandez 90'	Stadium: Mission Bay High School; Referee: Ricardo Fierro

May 10	FC Golden State Force (PDL)	2–0	Outbreak FC (LQ)	Glendora, California
7:00 PM PDT	Verso 7'; Lavandoski 21'	Report		Stadium: Citrus College; Referee: Michael Radchuk

May 10	Fresno Fuego (PDL)	4–1	La Máquina FC (LQ)	Fresno, California
7:00 PM PDT	Jose Cuevas 19', 70'; Chica 72'; Tavares 90'	Report	Montes de Oca 65'	Stadium: Chukchansi Park; Referee: Vincent Apple-Chiarella

May 10	Ventura County Fusion (PDL)	1–2	Moreno Valley Futbol Club (LQ)	Ventura, California
7:00 PM PDT	Feucht 89'		Castro 15'; Ochoa 19'	Stadium: Ventura College Sportsplex; Referee: Osvaldo Delgado-Landeros

May 10	FC Tucson (PDL)	3–1	Colorado Rush (LQ)	Tucson, Arizona
7:30 PM MST	Vasquez 3'; Perez 89'; Pinheiro 90'	Report	Wooliscroft 7'	Stadium: Kino North Stadium; Referee: Anthony Bersano

May 10	OSA FC (NPSL)	0–0 (a.e.t.) (5–3 p)	Seattle Sounders FC U-23 (PDL)	Seattle, Washington
7:30 PM PDT		Report		Stadium: Seattle High School Memorial Stadium; Referee: Benjamin Oakley
	Penalties
	Blanchard (penalty scored); Roldan (penalty scored); Jackson (penalty scored); Haddadi (penalty scored); Bwana (penalty scored)		(penalty scored) Rivas; (penalty scored) Keitz; (penalty missed) King; (penalty scored) Sandbekkhaug

May 10	L.A. Wolves FC (LQ)	4–2	San Diego Zest (PDL)	Azusa, California
7:30 PM PDT	Pitts 36'; Sanchez 59', 62'; Cardozo 72' (o.g.)	Report	Fortini 70'; McGrath 86' (pen.)	Stadium: Azusa Pacific University Soccer Field; Referee: Reyna Fonseca

May 12	Chicago FC United (PDL)	1–0	Grand Rapids FC (NPSL)	Wheaton, Illinois
3:00 PM CDT	Brown 90' (o.g.)	Report		Stadium: Joe Bean Stadium; Referee: Greg Dopka

=== Second round ===
Draw announced April 12.

May 16	Tampa Bay Rowdies (USL)	3–0	Jacksonville Armada U-23 (NPSL)	St. Petersburg, Florida
7:30 PM EDT	Porter 3'; Morrell 43'; Paterson 68'	Report		Stadium: Al Lang Stadium; Attendance: 2,490; Referee: Christina Unkel

May 17	Atlanta Silverbacks (NPSL)	1–2	Charleston Battery (USL)	Atlanta, Georgia
5:00 PM EDT	Harlley 73'	Report	Lasso 19'; Otoo 44'	Stadium: Atlanta Silverbacks Park; Attendance: 94; Referee: Aleksandar Zhelyazkov

May 17	Richmond Kickers (USL)	0–1	Christos FC (LQ)	Richmond, Virginia
7:00 PM EDT		Report	Caltabiano 79'	Stadium: City Stadium; Attendance: 850; Referee: JC Griggs

May 17	Rochester Rhinos (USL)	3–0	FC Motown (LQ)	Rochester, New York
7:00 PM EDT	Brown 2'; Graf 7'; Boukemia 85'	Report		Stadium: Capelli Sport Stadium; Attendance: 530; Referee: Juan Colazo

May 17	Boston City FC (NPSL)	1–2	GPS Omens (LQ)	Revere, Massachusetts
7:00 PM EDT	Batista 76'		Caldwell 22'; Romero 60'	Stadium: Harry Della Russo Stadium; Attendance: 316; Referee: Jason Pelletier

May 17	Miami United FC (NPSL)	1–2	Jacksonville Armada (NASL)	Hialeah, Florida
7:00 PM EDT	Camilli 32'	Report	Pitchkolan 35'; Blake 42' (pen.)	Stadium: Ted Hendricks Stadium; Attendance: 175; Referee: Jonathan Quinter

May 17	Carolina Dynamo (PDL)	1–6	North Carolina FC (NASL)	Browns Summit, North Carolina
7:00 PM EDT	Shear 74'	report	Shriver 21'; Fondy 37'; Shipalane 40'; Schuler 47', 85'; Orlando 57'	Stadium: Macpherson Stadium; Attendance: 300; Referee: Dustin Thorne

May 17	Charlotte Eagles (PDL)	2–3	Charlotte Independence (USL)	Charlotte, North Carolina
7:00 PM EDT	Williams 61'; Omondi 63'	Report	Townsend 10'; Martínez 77' (pen.), 88'	Stadium: Charlotte Christian School; Attendance: 602; Referee: Patrick Schmidt

May 17	Tartan Devils Oak Avalon (LQ)	0–9	Louisville City FC (USL)	Pittsburgh, Pennsylvania
7:00 PM EDT		Report Report	Varga 9' (o.g.); Kaye 17'; Ballard 25'; Ilić 41'; Lancaster 55', 83'; Totsch 69'; Jimenez 78'; Abend 86'	Stadium: Highmark Stadium; Attendance: 400; Referee: Jaroslaw Werel

May 17	FC Cincinnati (USL)	1–0 (a.e.t.)	AFC Cleveland (NPSL)	Cincinnati, Ohio
7:00 PM EDT	Fall 117'	Report		Stadium: Nippert Stadium; Attendance: 12,790; Referee: Tori Penso

May 17	Miami FC (NASL)	3–2	South Florida Surf (PDL)	Coral Gables, Florida
7:30 PM EDT	Poku 48'; Booth 60' (o.g.); Chavez 79'	Report	Espinal 21'; Michaud 74'	Stadium: Cobb Stadium; Attendance: 897; Referee: Esteban Rosano

May 17	Michigan Bucks (PDL)	1–0	Indy Eleven (NASL)	Pontiac, Michigan
7:30 PM EDT	Atuahene 36'	Report		Stadium: Ultimate Soccer Arenas; Attendance: 1,000; Referee: Nick Balcer

May 17	Reading United AC (PDL)	3–2	New York Cosmos (NASL)	Reading, Pennsylvania
7:30 PM EDT	Marie 39'; Micaletto 42'; Pierrot 45'	Report	Alhassan 12'; Szetela 64'	Stadium: Gene Shirk Stadium; Attendance: 347; Referee: Amber O'Connor

May 17	Ocean City Nor'easters (PDL)	0–0 (a.e.t.) (5–6 p)	Harrisburg City Islanders (USL)	Ocean City, New Jersey
7:30 PM EDT		Report		Stadium: Carey Stadium; Attendance: 227; Referee: Luis Arroyo
	Penalties
	Simović (penalty scored); Neto (penalty scored); Mompremier (penalty scored); Colmer (penalty missed); Fimić (penalty scored); Tellechea (penalty scored); Hemmings (penalty missed)		(penalty missed) Ribeiro; (penalty scored) McLaws; (penalty scored) Wheeler; (penalty scored) Nishanian; (penalty scored) DiPrima; (penalty scored) Mendoza; (penalty scored) Dabo

May 17	Chicago FC United (PDL)	3–1	Pittsburgh Riverhounds (USL)	Chicago, Illinois
7:00 PM CDT	Segbres 19'; Barlow 73'; Sierakowski 90+4'	Report Report	Banjo 58'	Stadium: Hoyne Field; Attendance: 300; Referee: Alex Beehler

May 17	FC Wichita (NPSL)	3–4 (a.e.t.)	Saint Louis FC (USL)	Wichita, Kansas
7:00 PM CDT	Sosa 7' (pen.); Gurson 62'; Corfe 81'	Report	Cochran 33'; Angulo 72', 95'; David 90+5'	Stadium: Stryker Soccer Complex; Attendance: 1,432; Referee: Elvis Mahmutovic

May 17	Houston Dutch Lions FC (NPSL)	1–2	San Antonio FC (USL)	Conroe, Texas
7:00 PM CDT	Scholman 62'	Report	Araujo 18'; Hassan 40'	Stadium: Dutch Lions FC Soccer Facility; Attendance: 250; Referee: Patrick Muana

May 17	Tulsa Roughnecks FC (USL)	5–3	OKC Energy U23 (PDL)	Tulsa, Oklahoma
7:00 PM CDT	Ayala 8'; Mata 13', 49'; Kondrakhin 45+2', 53'	Report	Lindstrom 59'; Gee 63' (o.g.); Okeke 73'	Stadium: Hurricane Soccer & Track Stadium; Attendance: 885; Referee: Matt Trotter

May 17	OKC Energy FC (USL)	5–1	Moreno Valley Futbol Club (LQ)	Norman, Oklahoma
7:00 PM CDT	Dixon 17', 69'; Wojcik 68'; González 73'; Craven 74'	Report	Gonzalez 8'	Stadium: John Craig Field; Attendance: 644; Referee: Jose Lara

May 17	Colorado Springs Switchbacks FC (USL)	2–0	FC Tucson (PDL)	Colorado Springs, Colorado
7:00 PM MDT	Jun Gyeong Park 46'; Frater 48'	Report		Stadium: Weidner Field; Attendance: 1,472; Referee: Chris Greer

May 17	Fresno Fuego (PDL)	1–3	Phoenix Rising FC (USL)	Fresno, California
7:00 PM PDT	Sousa 59'	Report	Wakasa 33'; Avila 35'; Seth 54'	Stadium: Fresno State Soccer & Lacrosse Stadium; Attendance: 1,499; Referee: Matthew Buckman

May 17	FC Golden State Force (PDL)	2–5	Orange County SC (USL)	Glendora, California
7:00 PM PDT	Verso 20' (pen.), 47'	Report Report	Pineda 6'; Etim 15' van Ewijk 26' (pen.); Totti 46', 55'	Stadium: Citrus College; Attendance: 300; Referee: Ceciah Valero

May 17	L.A. Wolves FC (LQ)	1–0 (a.e.t.)	Chula Vista FC (LQ)	Azusa, California
7:30 PM PDT	Cardozo 110' (pen.)	Report Report		Stadium: Azusa Pacific University; Attendance: 150; Referee: Anthony Almeida

May 17	Sacramento Republic FC (USL)	4–0	Anahuac FC (LQ)	Sacramento, California
7:30 PM PDT	Williams 12', 15'; Kneeshaw 66' (pen.); Trickett-Smith 85'	Report		Stadium: Papa Murphy's Park; Attendance: 5,308; Referee: Turan Ozdemir

May 17	San Francisco Deltas (NASL)	2–1	Burlingame Dragons FC (PDL)	Stanford, California
7:30 PM PDT	Ferreira 45'; Heinemann 62'	Report	Cox 29'	Stadium: Laird Q. Cagan Stadium; Attendance: 253; Referee: Vincent Apple-Chiarella

May 17	OSA FC (NPSL)	1–1 (a.e.t.) (3–4 p)	Reno 1868 FC (USL)	Tukwila, Washington
7:30 PM PDT	Gordley 14'	Report	Yomba 30'	Stadium: Starfire Sports Complex; Attendance: 250; Referee: Jeff Arthurholtz
	Penalties
	Blanchard (penalty missed); Roldan (penalty scored); Haddadi (penalty missed); Wright (penalty scored)		(penalty scored) Casiple; (penalty scored) Richards; (penalty missed) Hoppenot; (penalty scored) Burgos

=== Third round ===
Draw announced May 12.

May 30	Michigan Bucks (PDL)	1–2	Saint Louis FC (USL)	Pontiac, Michigan
8:00 PM EDT	Atuahene 46'	http://www.ussoccer.com/lamar-hunt-us-open-cup/open-cup-tournaments/2017-usoc/2017-us-open-cup-third-round/20170530-usoc-third-round-michigan-bucks-vs-saint-louis-fc Report	Dalgaard 13', 16'	Stadium: Ultimate Soccer Arenas; Attendance: 743; Referee: Benjamin Hall-Volpenhein

May 31	Rochester Rhinos (USL)	2–1 (a.e.t.)	GPS Omens (LQ)	Rochester, New York
7:00 PM EDT	Brown 52'; Edoung-Biyo 120+1'		Caldwell 55'	Stadium: Capelli Sport Stadium; Attendance: 436; Referee: Steve Montanino

May 31	Jacksonville Armada (NASL)	0–1	Charleston Battery (USL)	Jacksonville, Florida
7:00 PM EDT			Beckie 21' (o.g.)	Stadium: Southern Oak Stadium; Attendance: 831; Referee: Esteban Rosano

May 31	FC Cincinnati (USL)	1–0	Louisville City FC (USL)	Cincinnati, Ohio
7:00 PM EDT	Fall 49'			Stadium: Nippert Stadium; Attendance: 6,519; Referee: Brandon Artis

May 31	North Carolina FC (NASL)	4–1	Charlotte Independence (USL)	Cary, North Carolina
7:30 PM EDT	Marcelin 17'; Albadawi 51', 82'; Tobin 83'	report	A. Martínez 90+2' (pen.)	Stadium: WakeMed Soccer Park; Attendance: 2,052; Referee: Kevin Broadley

May 31	Miami FC (NASL)	2–0	Tampa Bay Rowdies (USL)	Miami, Florida
7:30 PM EDT	Rennella 73' (pen.); Chavez 83'	Report		Stadium: Riccardo Silva Stadium; Attendance: 1,403; Referee: Andres Pfefferkorn

May 31	Reading United AC (PDL)	0–3	Harrisburg City Islanders (USL)	Reading, Pennsylvania
7:30 PM EDT			DiPrima 8'; Bond 16', 50'	Stadium: Exeter Township Senior High School; Attendance: 505; Referee: Brandon Smith

May 31	Chicago FC United (PDL)	0–1	Christos FC (LQ)	Chicago, Illinois
7:00 PM CDT		Report	Houapeu 1'	Stadium: Hoyne Field; Attendance: 300; Referee: Becky Pagan

May 31	Tulsa Roughnecks FC (USL)	0–0 (a.e.t.) (7–6 p)	San Antonio FC (USL)	Tulsa, Oklahoma
7:00 PM CDT				Stadium: Hurricane Soccer & Track Stadium; Attendance: 5,532; Referee: Elvis Mahmutovic
	Penalties
	Calistri (penalty scored); Caffa (penalty scored); Kondrakhin (penalty missed); Svantesson (penalty scored); Cerda (penalty scored); Jadama (penalty scored); Fernandez (penalty scored); Ugarte (penalty scored)		(penalty scored) Castillo; (penalty scored) Araujo; (penalty scored) Vega; (penalty missed) O'Ojong; (penalty scored) Hassan; (penalty scored) Ajeakwa; (penalty scored) Newnam; (penalty missed) Restrepo

May 31	Colorado Springs Switchbacks FC (USL)	1–2	OKC Energy FC (USL)	Colorado Springs, Colorado
7:00 PM MDT	Burt 90+1' (pen.)		Barril 73'; Wojcik 84'	Stadium: Weidner Field; Attendance: 1,222; Referee: Karen Abt

May 31	Phoenix Rising FC (USL)	1–2	San Francisco Deltas (NASL)	Scottsdale, Arizona
7:30 PM MST	Bravo 86'		Bekker 82'; Heinemann 90+5'	Stadium: Phoenix Rising Soccer Complex; Attendance: 5,532; Referee: Robi Hullner

May 31	L.A. Wolves FC (LQ)	0–1	Orange County SC (USL)	Azusa, California
7:30 PM PDT			Meeus 41'	Stadium: Azusa Pacific University; Attendance: 500; Referee: Michael Radchuk

May 31	Sacramento Republic FC (USL)	2–0	Reno 1868 FC (USL)	Sacramento, California
7:30 PM PDT	Williams 41'; Caesar 59'			Stadium: Papa Murphy's Park; Attendance: 2,307; Referee: Matthew Buckman

=== Fourth round ===
Draw announced May 18.

June 13	D.C. United (MLS)	4–1	Christos FC (LQ)	Boyds, Maryland
7:30 PM EDT	Büscher 35', 90'; Sam 81'; Harkes 90+2'	Report	Kansaye 23'	Stadium: Maryland SoccerPlex; Attendance: 5,286; Referee: Marcos De Oliveira (Florida)

June 13	Colorado Rapids (MLS)	3–2	OKC Energy FC (USL)	Commerce City, Colorado
7:00 PM MDT	Badji 49'; Miller 66'; Castillo 89'	Report Report	Gonzalez 38'; Rasmussen 45+1'	Stadium: Dick's Sporting Goods Park; Attendance: 1,790; Referee: Karen Abt (Colorado)

June 13	Seattle Sounders FC (MLS)	2–1	Portland Timbers (MLS)	Tukwila, Washington
7:30 PM PDT	Kovar 3'; Mathers 54'	Report	Williams 38'	Stadium: Starfire Sports Complex; Attendance: 3,937; Referee: Allen Chapman (Utah)

June 14	FC Cincinnati (USL)	1–0	Columbus Crew SC (MLS)	Cincinnati, Ohio
7:00 PM EDT	Fall 64'	Report		Stadium: Nippert Stadium; Attendance: 30,160; Referee: Younes Marrakchi (Colorado)

June 14	North Carolina FC (NASL)	2–3 (a.e.t.)	Houston Dynamo (MLS)	Cary, North Carolina
7:30 PM EDT	Miller 4'; Laing 69'	Report	Wenger 25'; Remick 62'; Rodriguez 109'	Stadium: WakeMed Soccer Park; Attendance: 4,325; Referee: Mark Kadlecik (North Carolina)

June 14	New England Revolution (MLS)	3–0	Rochester Rhinos (USL)	Providence, Rhode Island
7:30 PM EDT	Bunbury 44' (pen.); D. Smith 50'; Herivaux 51'	Report		Stadium: Anderson Stadium; Attendance: 1,663; Referee: Henrik Karlsson (New Jersey)

June 14	Philadelphia Union (MLS)	3–1	Harrisburg City Islanders (USL)	Chester, Pennsylvania
7:30 PM EDT	D. Jones 19'; Sapong 33'; Epps 48'	Report Report	Mendoza 37'	Stadium: Talen Energy Stadium; Attendance: 3,866; Referee: Nima Saghafi (Oklahoma)

June 14	Atlanta United FC (MLS)	3–2	Charleston Battery (USL)	Kennesaw, Georgia
7:30 PM EDT	Kratz 30'; Martínez 48'; Vazquez 72'	Report	Lasso 3'; Marini 31'	Stadium: Fifth Third Bank Stadium; Attendance: 9,458; Referee: Guido Gonzales, Jr. (Georgia)

June 14	Orlando City SC (MLS)	1–3	Miami FC (NASL)	Orlando, Florida
7:30 PM EDT	Barnes 79'	Report	Stefano 30', 36', 55'	Stadium: Orlando City Stadium; Attendance: 5,838; Referee: Rubiel Vazquez (Florida)

June 14	New York Red Bulls (MLS)	1–0	New York City FC (MLS)	Harrison, New Jersey
8:00 PM EDT	Royer 67'	Report		Stadium: Red Bull Arena; Attendance: 11,311; Referee: Jose Carlos Rivero (New York)

June 14	Saint Louis FC (USL)	0–1	Chicago Fire (MLS)	Fenton, Missouri
7:00 PM CDT		Report	Solignac 27'	Stadium: Toyota Stadium; Attendance: 5,786; Referee: Jon Freemon (Kansas)

June 14	FC Dallas (MLS)	2–1	Tulsa Roughnecks FC (USL)	University Park, Texas
7:00 PM CDT	Craft 31'; Jadama 90+2' (o.g.)	Report Report	Kimura 59'	Stadium: Westcott Field; Attendance: 2,214; Referee: Fotis Bazakos (Minnesota)

June 14	Sporting Kansas City (MLS)	4–0	Minnesota United FC (MLS)	Kansas City, Kansas
7:30 PM CDT	Opara 43'; Fernandes 45+1'; Dwyer 72'; Sallói 83'	Report		Stadium: Children's Mercy Park; Attendance: 15,260; Referee: Juan Guzman (Nevada)

June 14	LA Galaxy (MLS)	3–1	Orange County SC (USL)	Carson, California
7:30 PM PDT	Villareal 17'; McBean 36' (pen.); Lassiter 73'	Report	Meeus 26'	Stadium: Stubhub Center Track Stadium; Attendance: 2,408; Referee: Ramy Touchan (California)

June 14	San Jose Earthquakes (MLS)	2–0	San Francisco Deltas (NASL)	San Jose, California
7:30 PM PDT	Yueill 4'; Cato 6'	Report		Stadium: Avaya Stadium; Attendance: 12,524; Referee: Victor Rivas (California)

June 14	Sacramento Republic FC (USL)	4–1	Real Salt Lake (MLS)	Sacramento, California
8:00 PM PDT	Caesar 29'; Cazarez 43'; Hall 45+1' (pen.); Barrera 71'	Report	Velazco 35'	Stadium: Papa Murphy's Park; Attendance: 11,569; Referee: Alex Chilowicz (California)

=== Round of 16 ===
Draw announced June 15.

June 27	FC Dallas (MLS)	3–1	Colorado Rapids (MLS)	Frisco, Texas
7:00 PM CDT	Diaz 45' (pen.); Hollingshead 57'; Morales 89'	Report	Azira 46'	Stadium: Toyota Stadium; Attendance: 4,131; Referee: Robert Sibiga (New York)

June 28	Houston Dynamo (MLS)	0–2	Sporting Kansas City (MLS)	Houston, Texas
5:30 PM CDT		Report	Opara 61'; Fernandes 90+1'	Stadium: BBVA Compass Stadium; Attendance: 6,095; Referee: Fotis Bazakos (Minnesota)

June 28	New England Revolution (MLS)	2–1	D.C. United (MLS)	Boston, Massachusetts
7:30 PM EDT	Fagúndez 44'; Wright 48'	Report	Ortiz 7'	Stadium: Jordan Field; Attendance: 2,572; Referee: Mark Kadlecik (North Carolina)

June 28	Miami FC (NASL)	3–2	Atlanta United FC (MLS)	Miami, Florida
7:30 PM EDT	Pinho 37'; Bernstein 52'; Ryan (yellow card) 62'; Poku 90+3'	Report	Vazquez 35'; Walkes (yellow card) 55'; Gressel 75' (pen.); González Pírez (yellow card) 88'; McCann (yellow card) 90+1'	Stadium: Riccardo Silva Stadium; Attendance: 9,004; Referee: José Carlos Rivero (New York)

June 28	New York Red Bulls (MLS)	1–1 (a.e.t.) (5–3 p)	Philadelphia Union (MLS)	Harrison, New Jersey
8:00 PM EDT	Kljestan 42'	Report	Alberg 86'	Stadium: Red Bull Arena; Attendance: 9,136; Referee: Alex Chilowicz (California)
	Penalties
	Zizzo (penalty scored); Verón (penalty scored); Royer (penalty scored); Kljestan (penalty scored); Felipe (penalty scored)		(penalty scored) Alberg; (penalty scored) Pontius; (penalty missed) Picault; (penalty scored) Epps

June 28	FC Cincinnati (USL)	0–0 (a.e.t.) (3–1 p)	Chicago Fire (MLS)	Cincinnati, Ohio
8:00 PM EDT		Report		Stadium: Nippert Stadium; Attendance: 32,287; Referee: Hilario Grajeda (Ohio)
	Penalties
	Quinn (penalty missed); Josu (penalty scored); Delbridge (penalty scored); McLaughlin (penalty scored)		(penalty missed) Nikolić; (penalty missed) Álvarez; (penalty scored) Schweinsteiger; (penalty missed) Juninho

June 28	San Jose Earthquakes (MLS)	2–1	Seattle Sounders FC (MLS)	San Jose, California
7:30 PM PDT	Salinas 6'; Hoesen 84'	Report	Kovar 48'	Stadium: Avaya Stadium; Attendance: 13,442; Referee: Nima Saghafi (Oklahoma)

June 28	LA Galaxy (MLS)	2–0	Sacramento Republic (USL)	Carson, California
7:30 PM PDT	Lassiter 47'; Jamieson IV 49'	Report		Stadium: StubHub Center; Attendance: 2,195; Referee: Alejandro Mariscal (California)

=== Quarterfinals ===
July 10	San Jose Earthquakes (MLS)	3–2	LA Galaxy (MLS)	San Jose, California
7:30 PM PDT	Wondolowski 16', 51'; Hoesen 62'	Report	Van Damme 3'; Tarbell 84' (o.g.)	Stadium: Avaya Stadium; Attendance: 14,056; Referee: Allen Chapman (Utah)

July 11	Sporting Kansas City (MLS)	3–0 (a.e.t.)	FC Dallas (MLS)	Kansas City, Kansas
7:30 PM CDT	Blessing 105+3', 105+8'; Sallói 118'	Report		Stadium: Children's Mercy Park; Attendance: 15,016; Referee: Younes Marrakchi (Colorado)

July 13	New England Revolution (MLS)	0–1	New York Red Bulls (MLS)	Boston, Massachusetts
7:30 PM EDT		Report	Wright-Phillips 87'	Stadium: Jordan Field; Attendance: 2,331; Referee: Jorge Gonzalez (New York)

August 2	Miami FC (NASL)	0–1	FC Cincinnati (USL)	Miami, Florida
7:30 PM EDT		Report	Fall 68'	Stadium: Riccardo Silva Stadium; Attendance: 10,415; Referee: Mark Kadlecik (North Carolina)

=== Semifinals ===
August 9	Sporting Kansas City (MLS)	1–1 (a.e.t.) (5–4 p)	San Jose Earthquakes (MLS)	Kansas City, Kansas
7:30 PM CDT	Rubio 32'		Hoesen 4'	Stadium: Children's Mercy Park; Attendance: 16,193; Referee: Nima Saghafi
	Penalties
	Feilhaber (penalty missed); Rubio (penalty scored); Sánchez (penalty scored); Medranda (penalty scored); Sallói (penalty scored); Besler (penalty scored)		(penalty missed) Wondolowski; (penalty scored) Imperiale; (penalty scored) Cerén; (penalty scored) Qazaishvili; (penalty scored) Jungwirth; (penalty missed) Bernárdez

August 15	FC Cincinnati (USL)	2–3 (a.e.t.)	New York Red Bulls (MLS)	Cincinnati, Ohio
8:00 PM EDT	Bone 31'; Berry 62'	Report	Verón 75'; Wright-Phillips 78', 101'	Stadium: Nippert Stadium; Attendance: 33,250; Referee: Sorin Stoica

=== Final ===
September 20, 2017
19:30 CDT

Sporting Kansas City	2–1	New York Red Bulls
Blessing 25'; Sallói 66'	Report	Wright-Phillips 90+1'

Children's Mercy Park, Kansas City, Kansas
Attendance: 21,523
Referee: Hilario Grajeda (United States)

== Top goalscorers ==
Rank	Scorer	Club	Goals
1	(Senegal) Djiby Fall	FC Cincinnati	4
1	(Brazil) Stefano Pinho	Miami FC	4
1	(England) Bradley Wright-Phillips	New York Red Bulls	4
4	(Ghana) Latif Blessing	Sporting Kansas City	3
4	(United States) Peter Caringi	Christos FC	3
4	(Netherlands) Danny Hoesen	San Jose Earthquakes	3
4	(United States) Jeff Michaud	South Florida Surf	3
4	(Hungary) Dániel Sallói	Sporting Kansas City	3
4	(United States) Mark Verso	FC Golden State Force	3
4	(England) Harry Williams	Sacramento Republic FC	3
10	(Palestine) Nazmi Albadawi	North Carolina FC	2
10	(Colombia) José Angulo	Saint Louis FC	2
10	(Ghana) Francis Atuahene	Michigan Bucks	2
10	(United States) Jake Bond	Harrisburg City Islanders	2
10	(Germany) Julian Büscher	D.C. United	2
10	(United States) Keith Caldwell	GPS Omens	2
10	(Trinidad and Tobago) Trevin Caesar	Sacramento Republic FC	2
10	(United States) Jaime Chavez	Miami FC	2
10	(England) Tyler Collishaw	Ocean City Nor'easters	2
10	(United States) Jose Cuevas	Fresno Fuego	2
10	(Denmark) Sebastian Dalgaard	Saint Louis FC	2
10	(United States) Alex Dixon	OKC Energy	2
10	(Guinea-Bissau) Gerso Fernandes	Sporting Kansas City	2
10	(Cape Verde) Wuilito Fernandes	Orange County SC	2
10	(Togo) Alex Harlley	Atlanta Silverbacks	2
10	(United States) Tom Heinemann	San Francisco Deltas	2
10	(Russia) Pavel Kondrakhin	Tulsa Roughnecks	2
10	(England) Cameron Lancaster	Louisville City	2
10	(Uruguay) Enzo Martínez	Charlotte Independence	2
10	(United States) Cristian Mata	Tulsa Roughnecks	2
10	(Belize) Deon McCaulay	Atlanta Silverbacks	2
10	(Belgium) Roy Meeus	Orange County SC	2
10	(Kenya) Kelvin Omondi	Charlotte Eagles	2
10	(United States) Ike Opara	Sporting Kansas City	2
10	(Ghana) Kwadwo Poku	Miami FC	2
10	(Mexico) Miguel Sánchez	L.A. Wolves FC	2
10	(United States) Billy Schuler	North Carolina FC	2
10	(Poland) Wojciech Wojcik	OKC Energy	2
10	(United States) Chris Wondolowski	San Jose Earthquakes	2

As of matches played on September 20, 2017.
