= Šaćir Hot =

American soccer player and coach

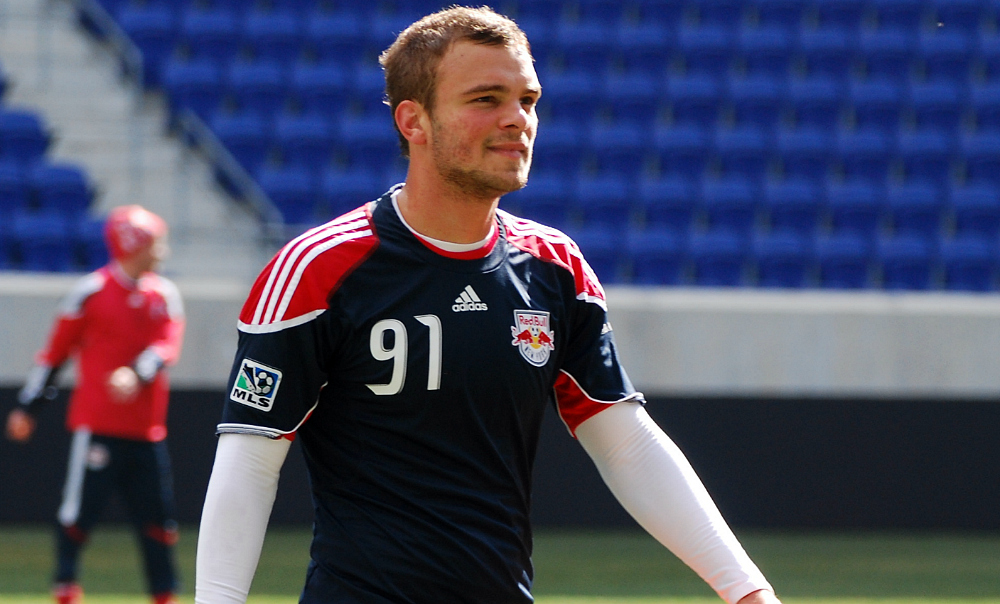

Personal information
- Date of birth: June 10, 1991 (age 35)
- Place of birth: Wayne, New Jersey, United States
- Height: 6 ft 1 in (1.85 m)
- Position: Central defender

Team information
- Current team: FC Motown (head coach)

Youth career
- 2006–2009: New York Red Bulls
- 2009–2010: Boston College Eagles

Senior career*
Years	Team	Apps	(Gls)
2011	New York Red Bulls	0	(0)
2013	Hessen Kassel	1	(0)

International career^{‡}
2010–2011	United States U20	4	(0)

Managerial career
- 2016–: FC Motown
- * Club domestic league appearances and goals as of July 5, 2013 ‡ National team caps and goals as of August 5, 2011

Šaćir Hot (Albanian: Shaqir Hoti; born June 10, 1991) is an American soccer coach and former player who is currently the head coach of FC Motown of the National Premier Soccer League and USL League Two.

== Career ==
=== College and amateur ===
Hot grew up in Fair Lawn, New Jersey and attended Fair Lawn High School, where he received numerous accolades during his high school career. Hot was also a member of the MetroStars (later, New York Red Bulls) academy for whom he played in the U-17 Clubs World Cup in 2007. He also captained both the u16 and u18 academy sides. In 2009 Hot decided to attend Boston College. During his time in college he remained with the New York Red Bulls Academy and was a member of the New York Red Bull NPSL squad. As a junior even though he was not still in college anymore he was nominated for the NSCAA Herman Watch List. He played American football as a kicker for Fair Lawn during his senior year.

=== Professional ===
Hot spent his first summer off from college training with the Red Bulls' first team where he impressed coach Hans Backe. During the January 2011 transfer window, he spent some time with Borussia Mönchengladbach and Borussia Dortmund in hopes of signing his first professional contract. He was invited back for preseason by Borussia Mönchengladbach but instead accepted a professional contract from the New York Red Bulls. Hot was signed by New York Red Bulls as a Homegrown Player on January 28, 2011. On June 28, 2011, Hot made his first team debut for New York playing in a preseason friendly vs Atlante in 2011. He made his professional debut playing the entire second half in a 2–1 victory over FC New York in the US Open Cup.

On February 17, 2012, Hot, along with Matt Kassel, were waived by the Red Bulls.

A year later, on January 15, 2013, Hot signed for Hessen Kassel of the Regionalliga Südwest. He would make one appearance for the club before moving back to the United States. Hot then almost signed with USL Pro side Antigua Barracuda but left after the club couldn't secure his international transfer certificate.

=== International ===
Hot has been a member of the United States Under-18 and Under-20 men's national team. He helped the U-20s capture the 2010 Milk Cup with a 3–0 win over Northern Ireland in Ballymena, Northern Ireland. Hot was also part of the final 20-man squad chosen to travel to Guatemala for U-20 World Cup qualification in April 2011. While attending Boston College Hot was invited to a Montenegro Under-21 camp to play friendlies but had to reject the invitation because it conflicted with his college season schedule.

== Coaching career ==
Hot was appointed head coach of Garden State Soccer League side FC Motown on September 10, 2016. His first match as a coach was to be the next day in a U.S. Open Cup qualifier against New York Greek American but the New York side forfeited the match. Hot's debut as head coach was in the second qualifying round of the U.S. Open Cup against Lansdowne Bhoys on October 16, 2016. Motown managed to get the victory 3–2 and qualified for the 2017 tournament proper.

Hot's side took on National Premier Soccer League side New Jersey Copa in the first round of the U.S. Open Cup on May 10, 2017, in which Motown managed to beat Copa 2–1 in extra time. By this match, Hot's Motown were undefeated in the Garden State Soccer League season, winning all 12 of their matches. One week later, on May 17, Hot lead Motown in the second round of the U.S. Open Cup against Rochester Rhinos of the United Soccer League. Motown fell 3–0 and were knocked out of the tournament.

In December 2017, it was announced that Motown would join the National Premier Soccer League for the 2018 season. In the club's first season in the league, Hot lead the side to first in the Keystone Conference, scoring 40 goals and conceding only 5. In the Keystone Conference Playoffs, Hot lead Motown to victories over FC Monmouth and West Chester United to qualify them to the Regional and National Playoffs. In the Regional and National Playoffs, Hot guided Motown to the NPSL National Final against Miami FC 2, where they were defeated by the Paul Dalglish lead side 3–1.

During the 2019 season, Hot managed Motown to third in the Keystone Conference, qualifying again for the Keystone Conference Playoffs. In the playoffs, Motown once again qualified for the Regional and National playoffs but were defeated in the regional semifinals against FC Baltimore Christos 1–0 on July 13.

== Personal ==
Hot is the son of Salih and Valbona Hot, who migrated to the United States from Montenegro in the 1980s. Hot's parents have Bosniak and Albanian backgrounds but they only lived in Montenegro, in the towns of Plav and Gusinje. In the 7th grade, he broke his leg, but in recovering he became stronger. He is the older cousin of Kenan Hot, who currently plays for New York City FC II.

== Honors ==
=== Player ===
United States U20

- Milk Cup: 2010

=== Head coach ===
FC Motown

- Keystone Conference: 2018
- Keystone Conference Playoffs: 2018, 2019
- Northeast Region: 2018
