= 2017 U.S. Open Cup qualification =

2017 Lamar Hunt U.S. Open Cup qualification
Tournament details
- Dates: 10 September 2016 – 13 November 2016
- Teams: 64

The 2017 Lamar Hunt U.S. Open Cup tournament proper will feature teams from all five tiers of men's soccer of the American Soccer Pyramid. A record 64 amateur teams have entered qualifying this year.

As with the 2016 tournament, US Soccer now oversees the qualifying process that used to be handled by each association. According to US Soccer, all teams within the Division I & II professional leagues will qualify automatically as in past years. Any Open Division national league can apply to use previous year's league standings as their qualification method. Remaining Open Division teams will participate in up to five qualifying rounds to determine entrants into the tournament proper. Final slot allocation will be determined when team registration has concluded.

== National League Track ==
=== Premier Development League (21 teams) ===
Twenty-one teams entered through the Premier Development League. Nine division winners, followed by 12 at large berths.

Division Winners
State	Club	PDL Division	App	Last	Previous Best
(North Carolina)	Charlotte Eagles	South Atlantic	14th	2016	Quarterfinals (2012)
(Iowa)	Des Moines Menace	Heartland	11th	2016	Fourth round (2005)
(Arizona)	FC Tucson	Southwest	4th	2016	Third round (2013)
(California)	Fresno Fuego	Central Pacific	4th	2014	Fourth round (2003)
(Maine)	GPS Portland Phoenix	Northeast	4th	2016	Second round (2013)
(Michigan)	Michigan Bucks	Great Lakes	14th	2016	Fourth round (2012)
(Oklahoma)	OKC Energy U23	Mid South	1st	—N/a	—N/a
(Pennsylvania)	Reading United AC	Mid Atlantic	11th	2016	Third round (2013 & 2014)
(Florida)	The Villages SC	Southeast	2nd	2016	Second round (2016)

At-Large Berths
State	Club	PDL Division	App	Last	Previous Best
(California)	Burlingame Dragons		3rd	2016	First round (2015 & 2016)
(North Carolina)	Carolina Dynamo	South Atlantic	12th	2016	Quarterfinals (1996)
(Illinois)	Chicago FC United	Heartland			
(Kentucky)	Derby City Rovers	Great Lakes	2nd	2013	First round (2013)
(California)	Golden State Force	Southwest			
(New Jersey)	Ocean City Nor'easters	Mid Atlantic	8th	2014	Third round (2005 & 2009)
(California)	San Diego Zest	Southwest			
(South Carolina)	SC United Bantams	South Atlantic	1st	—N/a	—N/a
(Washington (state))	Sounders FC U-23	Northwest	3rd	2016	Second round (2013 & 2016)
(Florida)	South Florida Surf	Southeast	1st	—N/a	—N/a
(Massachusetts)	Western Mass Pioneers	Northeast	10th	2015	Third round (2005)

=== National Premier Soccer League (18 teams) ===
Playoffs

- AFC Cleveland (OH)
- Albion SC Pros (CA)
- Chattanooga FC (TN)
- Clarkstown SC Eagles (NY)
- Grand Rapids FC (MI)
- Miami United FC (FL)
- New Jersey Copa FC (NJ)
- Sonoma County Sol (CA)

At-Large Berths

- AFC Ann Arbor (MI)
- Atlanta Silverbacks (GA)
- Boston City FC (MA)
- Dutch Lions FC (TX)
- FC Wichita (KS)
- Fredericksburg FC (VA)
- Jacksonville Armada U-23 (FL)
- Legacy 76 (VA)
- OSA FC (WA)
- Tulsa Athletics (OK)

== Local Qualifying Track ==
=== First qualifying round ===
First round games took place in 2016.

September 10	Vereinigung Erzgebirge (Pennsylvania)	2–5	(New Jersey) Brick Lions FC	Warminster, Pennsylvania
14:30 ET				Stadium: Vereingung Erzgebirge

September 10	Christos FC (Maryland)	3–1 (a.e.t.)	(Virginia) Aegean Hawks	Elkridge, Maryland
19:00 ET				Stadium: Troy Park

September 10	Junior Lone Star FC (Pennsylvania)	5–1	(Pennsylvania) Rising Stars FC	Drexel Hill, Pennsylvania
19:00 ET				Stadium: Monsingnor Bonner High School

September 10	West Chester United SC (Pennsylvania)	2–1	(Pennsylvania) Salone FC	West Chester, Pennsylvania
19:30 ET				Stadium: West Chester United SC Turf Field

September 10	Lansdowne Bhoys (New York (state))	3–2 (a.e.t.)	(New York (state)) New York Pancyprian-Freedoms	Yonkers, New York
20:00 ET				Stadium: Tibbetts Brooke Park

September 11	Newport FC (Rhode Island)	0–2 (forfeit)	(Connecticut) Newtown Pride FC	Portsmouth, Rhode Island
09:30 ET				Stadium: Gardiner Seveney Field

September 11	Southie FC (Massachusetts)	2–4	(Massachusetts) Global Premier Soccer Omens	Roxbury Crossing, Massachusetts
12:00 ET				Stadium: Madison Park

September 11	FC Motown (New Jersey)	2–0 (forfeit)	(New York (state)) New York Greek Americans SC	Clifton, New Jersey
14:30 ET				Stadium: Athenia Steel Park

September 17	El Farolito (California)	2–1	(California) Davis Legacy	San Francisco, California
11:00 PT				Stadium: Boxer Stadium

September 17	Oakland County FC (Michigan)	3–1	(Michigan) Ann Arbor FC	Rochester Hills, Michigan
18:00 ET				Stadium: Stoney Creek High School

September 17	HD Rush FC (California)	1–5	(California) Moreno Valley FC	Victorville, California
15:00 PT				Stadium: University Preparatory School

September 17	Harpo's FC (Colorado)	2–0	Colorado Rovers	Commerce City, Colorado
17:00 MT				Stadium: Dick's Sporting Goods Park

September 17	NTX Rayados (Texas)	7–0	(Texas) Celtic Cowboys Premier	Dallas, Texas
19:30 CT				Stadium: Richland College

September 17	FC Denver (Colorado)	1–3	(Colorado) Azteca FC	Aurora, Colorado
18:30 MT				Stadium: Aurora Sports Park

September 17	FC Hasental (California)	3–2	(California) Del Rey City SC	Canoga, California
19:00 PT				Stadium: Chaminade College Preparatory

September 17	La Máquina FC (California)	3–0	(California) Orange County FC	Westminster, California
19:00 PT				Stadium: Westminster High School

September 17	Inland Empire FC (California)	3–2	(California) Avalanche USA FC	Jurupa Valley, California
19:30 PT				Stadium: Rancho Jurupa Regional Sports Park

September 17	Ozzy's Laguna FC (California)	2–1	(California) OC Crew SC	Santa Ana, California
20:00 PT				Stadium: Santa Ana Stadium

September 18	Buena Park FC (California)	0–5	(California) Outbreak FC	La Palma, California
11:00 PT				Stadium: John F. Kennedy High School

September 18	Miami Dade FC (Florida)	0–2 (forfeit)	(Florida) Hurricane FC	Miami, Florida
15:00 ET				Stadium: Tropical Park Stadium

September 18	Miami Nacional SC (Florida)	0–3	(Florida) Red Force FC	Lauderhill, Florida
16:00 ET				Stadium: Lauderhill Sports Complex

September 18	Colorado Rush	3–0	(Colorado) FC Boulder	Lakewood, Colorado
15:00 MT				Stadium: Addenbrooke Soccer Complex

September 18	Real Sociedad Royals (California)	1–4	(California) L.A. Wolves FC	Bellflower, California
16:30 PT				Stadium: St. John Bosco Football Stadium

September 18	SFV Scorpions SC (California)	3–1	(California) Valley United SC	Mission Hills, California
17:00 PT				Stadium: Alemony High School

September 18	Strikers FC South Coast (California)	11–0	(California) AC Brea Steaua	Lake Forest, California
18:30 PT				Stadium: Lake Forest Sports Park

September 18	Frontera United (Arizona)	1–5	(California) Chula Vista FC	Yuma, Arizona
19:00 MST				Stadium: Desert Sun Stadium

September 18	Anahuac FC (Nevada)	2–0 (forfeit)	(Nevada) Las Vegas High Rollers	Las Vegas, Nevada
19:00 PT				Stadium: Sports Park

September 18	Santa Ana Winds FC (California)	5–0	(California) La Habra City FC	Colton, California
19:30 PT				Stadium: Colton High School

=== Second qualifying round ===
Second round games took place in 2016. All winners qualified for the tournament proper.

October 16	Christos FC (Maryland)	1–0	(Pennsylvania) West Chester United SC	Elkridge, Maryland
10:30 ET				Stadium: Troy Park

October 16	Newtown Pride FC (Connecticut)	1–3	(Massachusetts) Global Premier Soccer Omens	Newtown, Connecticut
14:00 ET				Stadium: Newtown High School

October 16	Tartan Devils Oak Avalon (Pennsylvania)	3–1	(Virginia) Aromas Café FC	Pittsburgh, Pennsylvania
16:30 ET				Stadium: Rooney Field

October 16	FC Motown (New Jersey)	3–2	(New York (state)) Lansdowne Bhoys	Bridgewater, New Jersey
20:15 ET				Stadium: Torpey Athletic Complex

October 22	Minneapolis City SC (Minnesota)	2–1 (a.e.t.)	(Michigan) Oakland County FC	Blaine, Minnesota
15:30 CT				Stadium: National Sports Center, Field U2
Note: Minneapolis City have been disqualified as they changed leagues after the start of local qualifying. US Soccer has not announced further details.

October 22	Harpo's FC (Colorado)	1–2	(Colorado) Azteca FC	Commerce City, Colorado
17:00 MT				Stadium: Dick's Sporting Goods Park, Field 8

October 22	Brick Lions FC (New Jersey)	2–3	(Pennsylvania) Junior Lone Star FC	Brick, New Jersey
19:00 ET				Stadium: Pinewood Park

October 22	Hurricane FC (Florida)	1–4	(Florida) Boca Raton FC	Boynton Beach, Florida
19:30 ET				Stadium: Caloosa Park, Field 3

October 22	NTX Rayados (Texas)	2–0	(Louisiana) CD Motagua	Balch Springs, Texas
20:30 CT				Stadium: Premier Park

October 22	Moreno Valley FC (California)	6–0	(California) Ozzy's Laguna FC	Moreno Valley, California
21:00 PT				Stadium: Moreno Valley Community Park

October 22	IPS/Marathon Taverna (Oregon)	0–4	Colorado Rush	Portland, Oregon
22:00 PT				Stadium: Delta Park

October 22	FC Hasental (California)	1–4	(California) Chula Vista FC	Canoga Park, California
22:00 PT				Stadium: Chaminade College Prep

October 23	Uruguay Kendall FC (Florida)	2–3 (a.e.t.)	(Florida) Red Force FC	Miami, Florida
16:00 ET				Stadium: Tropical Park Stadium

October 23	SFV Scorpions SC (California)	1–2	(California) Outbreak FC	Mission Hills, California
20:00 PT				Stadium: Alemany High School

October 23	Strikers FC South Coast (California)	1–2	(California) El Farolito	Lake Forest, California
21:30 PT				Stadium: Lake Forest Sports Park, Field A

October 23	Anahuac FC (Nevada)	2–0	(Nevada) MF 10	Las Vegas, Nevada
22:00 PT				Stadium: Las Vegas Sportspark

October 30	La Máquina FC (California)	3–0	(California) Santa Ana Winds FC	Irvine, California
18:00 PT				Stadium: Orange County Great Park - Field 1

November 13	Inland Empire FC (California)	2–9	(California) L.A. Wolves FC	Jurupa Valley, California
18:00 PT				Stadium: Rancho Jurupa Regional Park
