= Javier Castro =

Javier Castro may refer to:

- Javier Castro (footballer, born 1991), Mexican football forward for Moreno Valley
- Javier Castro (footballer, born 2000), Spanish football centre-back for Alcorcón
- Javier Castro Oliveira (1883–1958), Chilean politician, twice minister of health
