= Pete Caringi III =

American soccer player

Pete Caringi
Personal information
- Full name: Peter Anthony Caringi III
- Date of birth: September 24, 1992 (age 34)
- Place of birth: Perry Hall, Maryland, United States
- Height: 6 ft 1 in (1.85 m)
- Position: Forward

Youth career
- 2010–2013: UMBC Retrievers

Senior career*
Years	Team	Apps	(Gls)
2012–2013	Baltimore Bohemians	24	(18)
2014	Oklahoma City Energy	11	(1)
2017–	Christos FC		
- * Club domestic league appearances and goals as of August 15, 2014

Peter Anthony Caringi III (born September 24, 1992) is an American soccer player currently playing for Christos FC, a United States Adult Soccer Association team playing in the Baltimore metropolitan area.

== Early career ==
Caringi played college soccer at the University of Maryland, Baltimore County from 2010 to 2013. During his time at college, Caringi appeared for USL PDL club Baltimore Bohemians in 2012 and 2013.

== Professional ==
Caringi was selected by Montreal Impact in the third round of the 2014 MLS SuperDraft (48th overall), but was not signed by the club. Caringi later signed with USL Pro club Oklahoma City Energy on March 26, 2014.

Caringi scored a hat trick during the first round of the 2017 Lamar Hunt U.S. Open Cup, leading Christos FC over the NPSL's Fredericksburg FC.
