= FC Anahuac =

- Full name: FC Anahuac
- League: United Premier Soccer League

FC Anahuac is an American amateur soccer club based in Las Vegas, Nevada, that played in the United Premier Soccer League in 2016.

The club was established in Los Angeles in 1966 by brothers Peter and Jose Perez of Oxnard, California and relocated to Las Vegas in 1991.

Anahuac won the 2016 Fall season of the UPSL with a 13–1–1 record, defeating Inter Arizona FC on penalties in the championship game in Mesa, Arizona.

The team then qualified for the U.S. Open Cup for the first time in 2017. Their first qualification game was a walkover against the Las Vegas Highrollers and the second against MF 10 was called off in their favor at half time when the opponents were cut down to six players. Through this, they became the first club from Nevada to enter the cup in the modern era that began in 1995.

In the first round of the cup away to Sonoma County Sol of the National Premier Soccer League on May 10, Anahuac won on penalties after a 1–1 draw. A week later in the second round, the team traveled to Sacramento Republic FC of the United Soccer League and lost 4–0 at Papa Murphy's Park.
