= Boston City FC =

- 'Of the People, By The People, For the People'
- Full name: Boston City Football Club
- Nickname: Lions
- Founded: April 1, 2015; 11 years ago
- Stadium: Brother Gilbert Stadium
- Capacity: 2,250
- Owner / CEO: Renato Valentim
- Head Coach: Roberto Mazzighy
- League: USL League Two
- 2024: 8th, Northeast Division; Playoffs: DNQ
Home colors	Away colors

Boston City Football Club is an American men's soccer club based in Boston, Massachusetts that competes in the Northeast Division of USL League Two. The club was founded in 2015; their inaugural season was 2016. The club's colors are red, navy, and white, and plays its home matches at Brother Gilbert Stadium.

== History ==
Boston City FC was founded in 2015 by Renato Valentim and Jorge Ferreira da Silva (Palhinha). In their inaugural season (2016), the club placed second in NPSL's 9-team Northeast Atlantic Conference.

With its inaugural season results, City qualified for the 2017 U.S. Open Cup via an At-Large berth. The team won its first tournament game on May 10, defeating PDL side Western Mass Pioneers via penalty kicks. The Lions lost 2-1 at home to GPS Omens of the BSSL in the second round.

In early 2018, the organization announced a second team that would compete within the Bay State Soccer League, a fully amateur state run league affiliated within Region I of the United States Adult Soccer Association. The team, initially called "Boston City FC Under 20s" and later simply 'Boston City FC II', competed within Division 3 North in both 2018 and 2019. The second team also entered 2019 U.S. Open Cup qualification in late 2018, reaching the second round before falling to Safira FC.

Having not played in 2020 due to the COVID-19 pandemic, Boston City FC returned in 2021 under new head coach and former defender Gabriel De Souza, finishing fifth in the NPSL North Atlantic Conference with a 3-6-1 record.

Boston City FC moved to USL League Two on January 24, 2022.

Boston City's home kit typically consists of all red, with two vertical stripes of navy blue and white on the left chest. This design is reminiscent of the home kit worn by Boston Minutemen, the city's former North American Soccer League club during the mid-1970s.

== Roster ==
Note: Flags indicate national team as defined under FIFA eligibility rules; some limited exceptions apply. Players may hold more than one non-FIFA nationality.

No.	Pos.	Nation	Player
—	GK	USA	Michael Russo-Penta
—	GK	BRA	Vitor Scariot
—	DF	USA	Guilherme de Souza
—	DF	BRA	Gabriel Paganini Almeida
—	DF	BRA	Marcelo Lobo Cunha
—	DF	BRA	Leonardo Carvalho
—	DF	BRA	Jadson
—	MF	COL	Leandro Ramírez
—	MF	USA	Homero Morais

No.	Pos.	Nation	Player
—	MF	USA	Jonathan Argueta
—	MF	COL	Michael Rincón
—	MF	ITA	Luca Tarable
—	MF	USA	Leandro Bonfim Monteiro
—	MF	USA	Kevin Herrera
—	MF	BRA	Ronaldo Vieira
—	MF	BRA	Gabriel de Souza
—	FW	BRA	Jhonata Batista
—	FW	USA	Manuel Louro

=== Front office ===
- (Brazil) Renato Valentim - Owner
- (Brazil) Marcelo Nascimento - Manager
- (Brazil) Rubinho Lima - Broadcasting

== Year-by-year ==
Year	League	Regular season	Playoffs	U.S. Open Cup	Notes
2016	NPSL	2nd, Atlantic Conference	Regional first round	Ineligible	Lost in Northeast Regional first round to Legacy 76
2017	NPSL	2nd, Atlantic White Conference	Conference Semifinal	Second round	Lost in Conference Semifinal to Hartford City FC
2018	NPSL	9th, North Atlantic Conference	did not qualify	did not qualify	
2019	NPSL	7th, North Atlantic Conference	did not qualify	did not qualify	
2020	NPSL	Season cancelled due to COVID-19 pandemic			
2021	NPSL	5th, North Atlantic Conference	did not qualify	did not qualify	
2022	USL League Two	4th, Northeast Division	did not qualify	did not qualify	
2023	USL League Two	9th, Northeast Division	did not qualify	did not qualify	
2024	USL League Two	8th, Northeast Division	did not qualify	did not qualify	
2025	USL League Two	9th, Northeast Division	did not qualify	did not qualify	
2026	USL League Two	10th, Northeast Division	did not qualify	did not qualify	
