= Javier Castro (footballer, born 1991) =

Mexican professional footballer

Personal information
- Full name: Javier Castro Gonzalez
- Date of birth: August 15, 1991 (age 35)
- Place of birth: Guadalajara, Mexico
- Height: 5 ft 11 in (1.80 m)
- Position: Forward

Team information
- Current team: Kitsap Pumas
- Number: 28

College career
Years	Team	Apps	(Gls)
2010–2011	Mt. San Antonio College		(23)
2012	UC Santa Barbara Gauchos	16	(3)

Senior career*
Years	Team	Apps	(Gls)
2012	OC Blues Strikers	6	(4)
2013–2014	Chivas USA		
2014	Los Angeles Misioneros	7	(7)
2014	Oklahoma City Energy	11	(0)
2015	Ventura County Fusion	8	(1)
2016	Kitsap Pumas	7	(0)
2017–	Moreno Valley	0	(0)
- * Club domestic league appearances and goals as of May 13, 2017

Javier Castro Gonzalez (Note: In this Mexican name, the surname is Castro and the second or maternal family name is Gonzalez.) (born August 15, 1991) is a Mexican professional footballer currently with Moreno Valley FC in the United Premier Soccer League.

== Early life and education ==
Castro was born on August 15, 1991, in Guadalajara, Jalisco. He played youth soccer in Southern California and attended International Polytechnic High School. He was a finalist for Sueño MLS in 2010.

Castro attended Mt. San Antonio College and played college soccer from 2010 to 2011. He scored 23 goals and assisted on 21 others over his two seasons with the team.

He transferred to the University of California, Santa Barbara, and played with the UC Santa Barbara Gauchos men's soccer team in 2012, appearing in 16 games and scoring 3 goals with 1 assist.

== Career ==
While attending college, Castro appeared for USL Premier Development League club OC Blues Strikers FC in 2013. He appeared in 6 games for the club, scoring 4 goals.

Castro skipped his senior year at UC Santa Barbara and would appear in 2013 and 2014 for the U-23 side of Chivas USA. Later in 2014, he spent time with Los Angeles Misioneros and appeared in 7 games, scoring 7 goals with 3 assists.

Castro signed professional terms with USL Pro club Oklahoma City Energy FC in July 2014. He was not retained by the club and joined Ventura County Fusion in 2015. He appeared in 8 games for the Fusion, scoring one goal.

Castro went on trial with Segunda División de México side Real Cuautitlán in 2016, but it was ultimately unsuccessful. He would later trial with Kitsap Pumas successfully and was announced as a signing by the club in April 2016.
