= Levi Houapeu =

Ivorian footballer

Personal information
- Full name: Aquilas Levi Houapeu
- Date of birth: June 22, 1989 (age 37)
- Place of birth: Abidjan, Cote d'Ivoire
- Height: 5 ft 8 in (1.73 m)
- Positions: Forward; winger

Team information
- Current team: Maryland Bobcats
- Number: 23

College career
Years	Team	Apps	(Gls)
2007–2010	UMBC Retrievers		

Senior career*
Years	Team	Apps	(Gls)
2010	Reading United	8	(2)
2011	Philadelphia Union	0	(0)
2013–2016	Baltimore Blast (indoor)	44	(16)
2014–2016	Rochester Rhinos	8	(2)
2017–2018	Christos FC		
2018	World Class Premier Elite		
2018–2019	Swansea University		
2019–	Maryland Bobcats		
- * Club domestic league appearances and goals as of 10 February 2020

Aquilas Levi Houapeu (born June 22, 1989) is an Ivorian footballer who plays for Maryland Bobcats FC in the National Independent Soccer Association.

== College and amateur soccer ==
Houapeu attended University of Maryland, Baltimore County between 2007 and 2010. During his college years Houapeu also played for Reading United AC in the USL Premier Development League.

== Professional career ==
Houapeu was drafted in the third round (41st overall) of the 2011 MLS SuperDraft by Philadelphia Union. Houpeau's season ended with a serious injury in September, 2011 and he was released by the club at the end of the season.

He spent 2013 with MISL club Baltimore Blast, before signing with USL Pro club Rochester Rhinos on May 9, 2014.
