= FC Omens =

FC Omens is an American amateur soccer team from Boston, Massachusetts. It plays in the Bay State Soccer League, part of the United States Adult Soccer Association. The club was formerly known as GPS Omens until c. 2022. Previous names also include GPS Massachusetts and Mass Premier Soccer.

== History ==
Founded as Mass Premier Soccer, the team qualified for the U.S. Open Cup for the first time in 2013, losing 2–0 in the first round away to GPS Portland Phoenix of the Premier Development League.

The team returned to the cup the following year, losing 4–1 in the first round to Western Mass Pioneers. Renamed GPS Massachusetts, the team played host in the first round in 2015 at Buckingham Browne & Nichols School in Cambridge, Massachusetts, and lost 2–1 to Seacoast United Phantoms after leading 2–1 at half time.

After missing the 2016 cup, GPS Omens recorded the first undefeated season in the history of the Bay State Soccer League (16 wins, 2 ties) and qualified for the 2017 U.S. Open Cup, still featuring 15 of the players who took part in 2013. On May 10, they won a game in the cup for the first time, 2–0 at GPS Portland Phoenix, and followed it a week later with a 2–1 victory at Boston City FC of the National Premier Soccer League. In the third round on May 31, the team traveled to USL Pro team Rochester Rhinos, losing 2–1 with the decisive goal in time added onto the end of extra time.
