= Moreno Valley FC =

- Full name: Moreno Valley FC
- Nicknames: "Mo Val" "MVFC"
- Founded: 2015
- Dissolved: 2017
- Ground: Moreno Valley Community Park
- Owner/Coach: Will Vicente
- League: United Premier Soccer League
Home colors	Away colors

Moreno Valley FC was an American amateur soccer club from Moreno Valley, California which competed in the United Premier Soccer League between 2015 and 2017.

== History ==
Moreno Valley FC was founded in 2015 by Will Vicente with the aim of building a high-performing amateur side in the Inland Empire region of California. They entered the UPSL in 2016 and made an immediate impact, going unbeaten in league play, winning their conference, claiming the USASA Region IV title, and earning recognition from the city’s mayor. Their rapid rise brought them into regional and national cup competitions, including early steps toward U.S. Open Cup qualification.

In 2017 the club balanced league commitments with multiple knockout tournaments and continued to develop a possession-heavy, Latino-influenced style marked by slow buildup, pressing midfield play, and aggressive wing attacks. Their reputation grew further when they defeated Ventura County Fusion in the U.S. Open Cup before losing to OKC Energy FC. The match exposed recurring issues with discipline and tactical fragility when chasing a game, problems that undermined them during high-pressure fixtures.

The club folded quietly later that year after finishing third in the Cal South Adult Cup. Rising costs, including long-distance travel for cup matches, likely intensified financial strain, and the founder confirmed the team would not return. Moreno Valley FC existed for less than two years, a lifespan slightly below the norm for lower-league teams in the United States, but achieved a notable competitive peak within that short window.

== Honors ==
2017 U.S. Open Cup Entrant, 2nd Round
2017 Cal South State Cup Semifinalist
2016 United States Adult Soccer Region IV Champions
2016 Winter United Premier Soccer League Champions
