= Christos FC =

American amateur soccer team

- Full name: Christos Football Club
- Founded: 1997; 29 years ago
- Ground: Under Armour Stadium - Baltimore, MD
- General Manager: Jody Haislip
- Coach: Michael St. Martin
- League: USL League Two; Eastern Premier Soccer League; USASA
- 2024: 5th, Chesapeake Division; Playoffs: DNQ
- Website: christosfc.com
Home colors

Christos Football Club is an American soccer club based in Baltimore, Maryland, that competes in USL League Two & the American Premier Soccer League, an affiliated league of United States Adult Soccer Association. They formerly competed in the Maryland Major Soccer League & NPSL.

== History ==
Christos FC began in 1997 as a Sunday-league team composed of former professionals and local college players. The club’s colours are green, gold and black, and its name comes from Christos Discount Liquors. In 2016, they won both the Werner Fricker National Open Cup and the USASA National Amateur Cup.

In 2017 Christos FC qualified for the Lamar Hunt U.S. Open Cup and defeated fourth-division sides Fredericksburg FC and Chicago FC United, then upset second-division Richmond Kickers and reached the fourth round, where they played D.C. United of Major League Soccer; Christos scored first in that game, drawing media attention.

In 2018, Christos FC again qualified for the U.S. Open Cup but lost in the first round to Reading United AC on penalties.

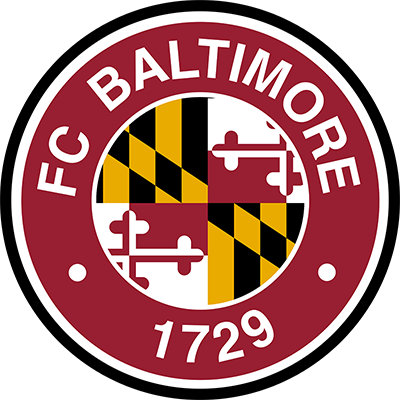
Logo of FC Baltimore 1729, which quickly merged into Christos FC following its founding in 2018

Also in 2018, a separate club, FC Baltimore 1729, was founded. The new club joined the National Premier Soccer League (NPSL), competing in the Mid Atlantic Conference of the Northeast Region. On November 5, 2018, FC Baltimore 1729 announced a formal partnership with Christos FC and changed its name to FC Baltimore Christos. They began sharing resources with the amateur side while continuing to compete in the NPSL.

In 2020, Christos FC qualified again for the U.S. Open Cup.

After the 2021 NPSL season, during which FC Baltimore Christos reached the National Finals, the club announced it would move to USL League Two for the 2022 season. At that point, FC Baltimore Christos was fully absorbed into the Christos FC structure, and the combined entity has operated solely as "Christos FC" since then.

Today, Christos FC competes in USL League Two and in the Eastern Premier Soccer League, the latter as part of an affiliation with the United States Adult Soccer Association.

== Year-by-year ==
Year	Division	League	Regular season	Playoffs	Open Cup
2022	4	USL League Two	2nd, Chesapeake	Conference Quarterfinals	Did not enter
2023	4	USL League Two	3rd, Chesapeake	Did not qualify	Second qualifying round
2024	4	USL League Two	5th, Chesapeake	Did not qualify	Did not qualify
2025	4	USL League Two	6th, Chesapeake	Did not qualify	Did not qualify
2026	4	USL League Two	7th, Chesapeake	Did not qualify	Third Qualifying Round

== Roster ==
Note: Flags indicate national team as defined under FIFA eligibility rules; some limited exceptions apply. Players may hold more than one non-FIFA nationality.

No.	Pos.	Nation	Player
1	GK	USA	Ethan Fesner
5	MF	USA	Cyrus Burgess
6	MF	USA	Steve Webb
7	FW	USA	Cosimo Manuzzi
8	DF	USA	Clive Pennock
11	MF	USA	Tom Danvers
15	DF	USA	Elijah Butler
16	MF	USA	Jesse O'Brian

No.	Pos.	Nation	Player
19	DF	USA	Noriaki Maeno
22	MF	USA	Festus Jefferson
23	DF	USA	Jimmy Doe Jr.
24	GK	USA	Kenny Prince
25	DF	USA	Curtis Hoover
80	FW	USA	Kyle Clayton
92	FW	USA	Stan Cohen

== Club honors ==
- USASA National Amateur Cup (1): Champions 2016
- USASA Werner Fricker National Open Cup (2): Champions 2016, 2018
- Lamar Hunt U.S. Open Cup 4th Round 2017
- Lamar Hunt U.S. Open Cup 1st Round 2018
- USASA Over-30 Gerhard Mengel National Cup (3): Champions 2012, 2013, 2014
- USASA U-23 National Champions (1): Champions 2002
- USASA Over-50 Giacomo Testani National Champions 2024
- United States Adult Soccer Association

USASA National Amateur Cup Champions 2016 & Werner Fricker Open Cup Champions 2016, 2018 USASA Region 1 Open Cup Champions 2016, 2018 & Amateur Cup Champions 2016 Maryland Rowland Cup Champions 2000, 2009, 2016, 2017, 2018, 2020, 2022, 2023 Maryland Stewart Cup Champions 2001, 2002, 2006, 2016, 2017, 2018, 2019, 2020, 2021, 2022, 2024, 2025 Maryland State Cup 0-30 Champions 2008, 2009, 2011, 2012, 2013, 2014, 2016, 2017, 2018, 2019, 2021, 2022, 2023, 2024 Maryland State Cup O-40 Champions 2018, 2019, 2021, 2022, 2023, 2024 Maryland State Cup O-50 Champions 2023, 2024 USASA Region 1 & Gerhard Mengel O-30 National Champions 2012, 2013, 2014 -->
