= 2019 Spring UPSL season =

United Premier Soccer League
- Season: 2019 Spring
- Champions: Tropics SC

The 2019 Spring United Premier Soccer League season is the 12th season of the UPSL.

== Pro Premier ==
=== Team changes ===
These tables show changes made since the 2018 Spring season for the Atlanta Caribbean Division, Midwest Conference, Northeast Conference, and Southwest Conference which did not participate in the 2018 Fall season. All other changes are compared to the Fall season.

==== Incoming teams ====
Team	Division	Notes	Ref
AFC Hearts of San Francisco	Wild West	Returned from hiatus; last played 2018 Spring	
African Stars	Mountain	Joined from local amateur play	
Alaska City FC	Alaska-Last Frontier	Expansion	
Almeyda FC	Central South	Expansion	
Arctic Rush	Alaska-Last Frontier	Expansion	
Atletico Barra Soccer Academy	Florida Dade/Broward	New Club	
Atlético Miami CF	Florida Dade/Broward	Expansion	
Atletico Olanchano FC	Mid-Atlantic South A	Joined from local amateur play	
Baltimore United FC	Mid-Atlantic North	Joined from Maryland Majors Soccer League	
Bat Country FC	Central Heart	New senior team of youth club	
BiH Grand Rapids	Midwest East	New outdoor team of futsal club	
Brockton FC United	Northeast	Expansion	
Cedar Rapids Inferno SC	Midwest Central	New club	
Charleston United SC	Mid-Atlantic South B	New senior team of youth club	
City Legends FC	SoCal South	Promoted from Championship	
Clay County SC	Florida Central East	Returned from hiatus; last played 2018 Spring	
Club Atletic	Atlanta Caribbean	Expansion	
Contra Costa FC	Wild West	Joined from LIGA NorCal	
Cook Inlet SC	Alaska-Last Frontier	Expansion	
Dakota Young Stars FC	Midwest West	Joined from Sioux Falls La Liga	
Del Sol FC	Mid-Atlantic South A	New club	
FC Diablos	Midwest South	Joined from local amateur play	
FC Millennium	Mid-Atlantic North	New senior team of youth club	
Florida Soccer Soldiers 2	Florida Dade/Broward	New reserve team of Florida Soccer Soldiers	
Forest Rovers FC	Atlanta Caribbean	New club	
FPS FC	Southwest	New senior team of youth club	
Golden Goal Sports SC	Florida Central East	Returned from hiatus; last played 2018 Spring	
Goldsboro Strike Eagles FC	Mid-Atlantic South A	New club	
Gordis FC	Mountain	Expansion	
Greater Orlando Soccer Academy	Florida Central East	Expansion	
High Plains Drifters SC	Southwest	New senior team of youth club	
Honduras 5 Estrellas	Atlanta Caribbean	Expansion	
Idaho Falls FC	Mountain	Expansion	
Inland Empire FC	SoCal South	Promoted from Championship	
Inter City SC	Southwest	Expansion	
Inter Orlando FC	Florida Central West	Returned from hiatus; last played 2018 Spring	
Jacksonville Armada FC Youth Academy	Florida Central East	New academy team of Jacksonville Armada FC	
Kernow Storm FC	Central North	Joined from Arlington Adult Soccer League	
Krajisnik SC	Northeast	Joined from Central New York State Soccer League	
KSA Pro	Atlanta Caribbean	Expansion	
LA 10 FC	SoCal North	Promoted from Championship	
L.A. Galaxy OC PSC	SoCal South	Returned from hiatus; last played 2018 Spring	
Leg A-Z Soccer International	Florida Central East	New senior team of youth club	
LSA Pro	Mid-Atlantic South B	Expansion	
Macca Ballers FC	Florida Central East	Returned from hiatus; last played 2018 Spring	
Magic Valley FC	Mountain	Returned from hiatus; last played 2018 Spring	
Makasi FC International	Mountain	Expansion	
Miami AC	Florida Dade/Broward	New club	
Miami Dade FC	Florida Dade/Broward	Returned from hiatus; last played 2018 Spring	
Miami United FC	Florida Dade Broward	New team of National Premier Soccer League club	
Michigan Jaguars FC	Midwest East	New senior team of youth club	
New Hampshire Bobcats	Northeast	Expansion	
OFC Barca	Florida Central East	Joined from Continental Soccer League	
OKC 1889 FC	Central North	Returned from hiatus; last played 2018 Spring	
Pajaro Valley United	Wild West	Expansion	
Pro-Profile	Atlanta Caribbean	Expansion	
PSL United SC	Florida Palm Beach	New senior team of youth club	
Real New York FC	Northeast	Joined from Long Island Soccer Football League	
Redding Royals FC	Wild West	Returned from hiatus; last played 2018 Spring	
Red Force FC	Florida Dade/Broward	Joined from American Premier Soccer League	
Reign FC	Central North	New club	
Rochester FC	Midwest West	New club	
San Antonio Corinthians FC	Central South	Expansion	
Southwest FC U21	Southwest	Expansion	New reserve team of Southwest FC
Sports Paradize Soccer Academy	Florida Central West	Expansion	
Springfield FC	Midwest South	Joined from local amateur play	
St. Petersburg FC Aztecs	Florida Central West	Returned from hiatus; last played 2018 Spring	
Tapatio FC	Southwest	Joined from local amateur play	
Texas Hawks FC	Central South	Expansion	
Texas International FC	Central South	Expansion	
Texas Spurs	Central North	Returned from hiatus; last played 2018 Spring	
Tropics SC	Florida Central West	New outdoor team of Major Arena Soccer League club	
Turbo Sports FC	Midwest West	Joined from Minnesota Amateur Soccer League	
Utah Murcielagos	Mountain	Expansion	
Vlora City FC	Midwest West	Joined from Minnesota Amateur Soccer League	
Waza Flo	Midwest East	New outdoor team of Major Arena Soccer League 2 club	
World Class Premier	Mid-Atlantic North	Joined from Washington Premier League and Maryland Majors Soccer League	

==== Rebranded teams ====
Old Name	New Name
Broncos United FC NC	Broncos United FC
FC Imperial	Cedar Stars Rush
FC Stone Mountain	FC Stone Mountain Granites
Miami Wolves FC	Florida Wolves FC
Irving City FC	Irving FC

==== Transferred teams ====
Team	Old Division	New Division
Croatian Eagles	Midwest North	Midwest Central
FC Cardinals	Mid-Atlantic North	Mid-Atlantic South B
FC Minneapolis	Midwest North	Midwest West
Granite City FC	Midwest North	Midwest West
Joliet United SC	Midwest Central	Midwest South
Madison 56ers	Midwest North	Midwest Central
Milwaukee Bavarian SC	Midwest North	Midwest Central
Old Bhoys SC	Midwest East	Midwest South
RWB Adria	Midwest Central	Midwest South
Samba FC San Antonio	Central South	Central Heart
St. Louis Maritsa	Midwest West	Midwest South

==== Outgoing teams ====
Team	Final Division	Notes
America SC	Florida Central	Left league
Arizona Scorpions	Southwest	Left league
Armadillos FC	Central South	Left league
Aurora Borealis SC	Midwest Central	Left league
Austin Real Cuauhtemoc	Central Heart	Left league
Azteca FC	Wild West	Left league
Barilleros FC	Midwest West	Left league
Boston Siege FC	Patriot	Relegated to Championship
California United FC II	SoCal South	Left league
C-Ville FC	Mid-Atlantic North	On hiatus
Dallas City FC	Central North	Relegated to Championship
Dallas Elite FC	Central North	On hiatus
Dynamos FC	Wild West South	On hiatus
Elgin Pumas SC	Midwest Central	Left league
First Touch Elite Soccer	American	Left league
Fullersfield FC Lions	Florida South	Left league
Gold Coast Inter AFC	Florida South	Left league
Green Bay United	Midwest North	Left league
Inferno FC	Atlanta Caribbean	Left league
Instituto Atletico FC	Florida Central	Relegated to Championship
International SC	Patriot	Relegated to Championship
Jupiter United SC	Florida South	Left league
Juve-Pro Soccer	Patriot	Relegated to Championship
Keene FC	Central North	On hiatus
Lynn United	Patriot	Left league
Major Academy Competitive FC	Central Heart	Joined US Premiership
Muskegon Risers SC	Midwest East	Left league
Napa Sporting SC	Wild West	Left league
Nebraska Bugeaters FC	Midwest West	Joined Great Plains Premier League
New Hampshire Rapids FC	Patriot	Left league
OC Real Force SC	SoCal South	Relegated to Championship
Orange County FC 2	SoCal South	On hiatus during National Premier Soccer League season
Panamerican FC	SoCal North	Relegated to Championship
Quinto Elemento FC	Midwest West	Left league
Reno United	Atlanta Caribbean	Left league
Rochester Super 9 Pro SC	American	Left league
Safira FC	Patriot	Relegated to Championship
San Diego Zest FC	SoCal South	On hiatus during USL League Two season
Sambo FC	Atlanta Caribbean	Left league
Santa Fe Wanderers	Midwest West	Left league
Screaming Eagles FC	American	Left league
SGFC Eagles Maryland	American	Left league
Sharks FC	Florida South	Left league
Sparta 20/20 FC	Mid-Atlantic South	Left league
Sporting AZ FC II	Southwest	Folded
Terrell FC	Central North	Relegated to Championship
Toledo Villa FC	Midwest East	Joined National Premier Soccer League
Unations FC	Patriot	Relegated to Championship
Upper Darby FC	American	Left league
Union FC	Mid-Atlantic South	Left league
West Park FC	Florida South	Left league
Winter Haven United FC	Florida Central	Left league

=== Division changes ===
- The Midwest Conference's divisions were realigned; in 2018 they were Central, East, North, and West. For 2019, they are Central, East, South, and West and cover different areas.
- The Northeast Conference's American and Patriot Divisions were merged into a single table.
- The Florida Central Division was split into East and West sections. Deportivo Lake Mary was transferred to the East section while Huracan FC, Interunited Academy, Sporting Orlando, and The Institute FC were transferred to the West section.
- The Florida South Division was split into Florida Dade/Broward and Florida Palm Beach divisions. Florida Soccer Soldiers, Hebraica Miami FC, Hialeah City FC, Miami Sun FC, UD Miami FC were transferred to the Florida Dade/Broward Division while Florida Wolves FC, FSI Vultures FC, Hurricane FC, International Soccer Association, and Palm Beach Spartans were transferred to the Florida Palm Beach Division.
- The Mid-Atlantic Division's South section was further split into A and B sections. Broncos United FC and San Lee FC were transferred to the A section while Savannah Clovers FC and Soda City FC were transferred to the B section.
- The Wild West Division's North and South sections were merged into a single table.

=== Competition format ===
Teams are divided into conferences, some of which are further subdivided into divisions. Following the regular season, teams compete in a playoff tournament to determine a single national champion. Unless specified otherwise, all playoff matches are contested over a single leg, hosted by the team with the best points-per-game ratio. Extra time is not used in any round; matches drawn after 90 minutes advance directly to a penalty shootout.

- Central Conference: Teams are divided into Heart, North, and South divisions. Each division plays a double round robin for 14, 12, and 14 matches respectively. The top two teams from each division plus the two best third place teams by points-per-game qualify for the playoffs.
- Midwest Conference: Teams are divided into Central, East, South, and West divisions. Each division plays a double round robin for 10 matches. The regular season champion of each division qualifies for the playoffs which are held at a single location to be determined.
- Mountain Conference: Teams play a double round robin for 16 matches.
- Northeast Conference: Teams play a single round robin for eight matches.
- Southeast Conference: Teams are divided into Florida Central, Florida Dade/Broward, Florida Palm Beach, and Mid-Atlantic divisions.
  - Florida Central Division: Teams are further divided into East and West sections. Each team plays the other seven teams within its section plus five teams in the other section for a total of 12 matches.
  - Florida Dade/Broward Division: Teams play a single round robin for 11 matches.
  - Florida Palm Beach Division: Teams play two of their rivals twice and the rest once for an 11 match schedule.
  - Mid-Atlantic Division: Teams are further divided into North, South A, and South B sections. Each section plays a double round robin for 10, 8, and 10 matches respectively.
- Southwest Conference: Teams play two of their rivals twice and the rest once for a 10 match schedule.
- Western Conference: Teams are divided into SoCal and Wild West divisions. Each division determines its own champion with the two divisional champions then matched up to determine the conference champion.
  - SoCal Division: Teams are further divided into North and South sections. Each section plays a double round robin for 14 matches. The top three teams in each section qualify for the playoffs, with the section leaders receiving byes to the divisional semifinals. The last placed team in each section is relegated to the Championship.
  - Wild West Division: Teams play each opponent either zero, one, or two times with no discernible pattern for a total of 10 matches. The top eight teams qualify for the playoffs.

=== Standings ===
==== Alaska-Last Frontier Division standings ====
Pos	Team	Pld	W	D	L	GF	GA	GD	Pts
1	Cook Inlet SC	4	3	1	0	15	5	+10	10
2	Arctic Rush	4	1	2	1	6	6	0	5
3	Alaska City FC	4	0	1	3	2	11	−9	1

Rules for classification: 1) Points; 2) Goal difference; 3) Goals scored; 4) Head-to-head points; 5) Head-to-head goal difference; 6) Head-to-head goals scored; 7) Head-to-head matches won; 8) Playoff

==== Central Heart Division standings ====
Pos	Team	Pld	W	D	L	GF	GA	GD	Pts	Qualification
1	San Antonio Runners SC (Q)	14	12	1	1	48	13	+35	37	Qualification for the Central Conference playoffs
2	FC Waco (Q)	14	11	2	1	44	12	+32	35	Qualification for the Central Conference playoffs
3	Coyotes FC (Q)	14	9	0	5	23	15	+8	27	Qualification for the Central Conference playoffs
4	Samba FC San Antonio	14	9	0	5	30	34	−4	27	
5	Bat Country FC	14	4	1	9	19	42	−23	13	
6	FC Thunder Boerne	13	3	1	9	9	27	−18	10	
7	Round Rock SC	13	3	1	9	11	31	−20	10	
8	FC Knights	14	1	0	13	3	13	−10	3	

Rules for classification: 1) Points; 2) Goal difference; 3) Goals scored; 4) Head-to-head points; 5) Head-to-head goal difference; 6) Head-to-head goals scored; 7) Head-to-head matches won; 8) Playoff
(Q) Qualified for the phase indicated

==== Central North Division standings ====
Pos	Team	Pld	W	D	L	GF	GA	GD	Pts	Qualification
1	Inocentes FC (Q)	12	8	1	3	26	22	+4	25	Qualification for the Central Conference playoffs
2	OKC 1889 FC (Q)	12	7	3	2	33	14	+19	24	Qualification for the Central Conference playoffs
3	Texas Spurs (Q)	12	5	2	5	18	21	−3	17	Qualification for the Central Conference playoffs
4	Irving City FC	10	5	1	4	23	20	+3	16	
5	Reign FC	10	4	1	5	15	14	+1	13	
6	FC Denton	11	4	1	6	27	30	−3	13	Relegation to the Championship
7	Kernow Storm FC (R)	10	1	1	8	10	31	−21	4	Relegation to the Championship

Updated to match(es) played on June 23, 2019. Source:
Rules for classification: 1) Points; 2) Goal difference; 3) Goals scored; 4) Head-to-head points; 5) Head-to-head goal difference; 6) Head-to-head goals scored; 7) Head-to-head matches won; 8) Playoff
(Q) Qualified for the phase indicated; (R) Relegated

==== Central South Division standings ====
Pos	Team	Pld	W	D	L	GF	GA	GD	Pts	Qualification
1	Almeyda FC (Q)	13	10	1	2	42	18	+24	31	Qualification for the Central Conference playoffs
2	San Antonio Corinthians FC (Q)	12	9	0	3	44	12	+32	27	Qualification for the Central Conference playoffs
3	Houston FC (Q)	12	8	1	3	33	13	+20	25	Qualification for the Central Conference playoffs
4	Atletico Katy	13	7	2	4	32	25	+7	23	
5	Texas International FC	11	5	1	5	21	20	+1	16	
6	Bay Area Oilers FC	12	4	1	7	23	33	−10	13	
7	Cedar Stars Rush	12	1	2	9	19	41	−22	5	
8	Texas Hawks FC	13	0	2	11	9	61	−52	2	

Updated to match(es) played on June 22, 2019. Source:
Rules for classification: 1) Points; 2) Goal difference; 3) Goals scored; 4) Head-to-head points; 5) Head-to-head goal difference; 6) Head-to-head goals scored; 7) Head-to-head matches won; 8) Playoff
(Q) Qualified for the phase indicated

==== Midwest Central Division standings ====
Pos	Team	Pld	W	D	L	GF	GA	GD	Pts	Qualification
1	Milwaukee Bavarian SC	5	4	1	0	16	4	+12	13	Qualification for the Midwest Conference playoffs
2	DeKalb County United	7	3	3	1	14	10	+4	12	
3	Croatian Eagles	7	2	1	4	13	21	−8	7	
4	Union Dubuque FC	7	1	3	3	14	20	−6	6	
5	Cedar Rapids Inferno	6	1	2	3	11	13	−2	5	

Updated to match(es) played on June 22, 2019. Source:
Rules for classification: 1) Points; 2) Goal difference; 3) Goals scored; 4) Head-to-head points; 5) Head-to-head goal difference; 6) Head-to-head goals scored; 7) Head-to-head matches won; 8) Playoff

==== Midwest East Division standings ====
Pos	Team	Pld	W	D	L	GF	GA	GD	Pts	Qualification
1	Carpathia FC	8	5	2	1	16	8	+8	17	Qualification for the Midwest Conference playoffs
2	Waza Flo	9	4	2	3	17	20	−3	14	
3	Bih GR	7	4	1	2	13	9	+4	13	
4	Michigan Jaguars	8	2	2	4	11	12	−1	8	
5	Oakland County FC	8	2	1	5	18	21	−3	7	
6	AAFC Lumberjacks	6	1	2	3	10	15	−5	5	

Updated to match(es) played on June 18, 2019. Source:
Rules for classification: 1) Points; 2) Goal difference; 3) Goals scored; 4) Head-to-head points; 5) Head-to-head goal difference; 6) Head-to-head goals scored; 7) Head-to-head matches won; 8) Playoff

==== Midwest South Division standings ====
Pos	Team	Pld	W	D	L	GF	GA	GD	Pts	Qualification
1	Joliet United SC	9	8	0	1	28	14	+14	24	Qualification for the Midwest Conference playoffs
2	RWB Adria	7	5	1	1	20	9	+11	16	
3	Old Bhoys SC	9	5	0	4	25	25	0	15	
4	St. Louis Maritsa	7	3	1	3	16	16	0	10	
5	Springfield FC	7	0	1	6	5	14	−9	1	
6	FC Diablos	7	0	1	6	10	26	−16	1	

Updated to match(es) played on June 22, 2019. Source:
Rules for classification: 1) Points; 2) Goal difference; 3) Goals scored; 4) Head-to-head points; 5) Head-to-head goal difference; 6) Head-to-head goals scored; 7) Head-to-head matches won; 8) Playoff

==== Midwest West Division standings ====
Pos	Team	Pld	W	D	L	GF	GA	GD	Pts	Qualification
1	Vlora City FC	9	7	1	1	36	7	+29	22	Qualification for the Midwest Conference playoffs
2	Rochester FC	10	7	1	2	21	9	+12	22	
3	Dakota Young Stars FC	8	4	0	4	12	19	−7	12	
4	FC Minneapolis	8	2	3	3	14	15	−1	9	
5	Granite City FC	9	2	0	7	10	33	−23	6	
6	Turbo Sports FC	8	1	1	6	11	21	−10	4	

Updated to match(es) played on June 22, 2019. Source:
Rules for classification: 1) Points; 2) Goal difference; 3) Goals scored; 4) Head-to-head points; 5) Head-to-head goal difference; 6) Head-to-head goals scored; 7) Head-to-head matches won; 8) Playoff

==== Mountain Conference standings ====
Pos	Team	Pld	W	D	L	GF	GA	GD	Pts	Qualification
1	San Juan FC (Q)	16	12	2	2	63	23	+40	38	Qualification for the Mountain Conference playoffs
2	Utah Murcielagos (Q)	16	12	2	2	59	21	+38	38	Qualification for the Mountain Conference playoffs
3	Gordis FC (Q)	16	9	3	4	33	24	+9	30	Qualification for the Mountain Conference playoffs
4	Boise Cutthroats FC (Q)	16	8	2	6	29	27	+2	26	Qualification for the Mountain Conference playoffs
5	Idaho Falls FC	16	7	2	7	34	34	0	23	
6	Magic Valley FC	16	7	1	8	32	46	−14	22	
7	African Stars	16	6	0	10	20	33	−13	18	
8	Utah Saints FC	16	5	0	11	30	63	−33	15	
9	Makasi FC International	16	0	0	16	1	30	−29	0	

Rules for classification: 1) Points; 2) Goal difference; 3) Goals scored; 4) Head-to-head points; 5) Head-to-head goal difference; 6) Head-to-head goals scored; 7) Head-to-head matches won; 8) Playoff
(Q) Qualified for the phase indicated

==== Northeast Conference standings ====
Pos	Team	Pld	W	D	L	GF	GA	GD	Pts	Qualification
1	Mass United FC (Q)	8	7	0	1	29	10	+19	21	Qualification for the National playoffs
2	New Jersey Teamsters FC	8	6	1	1	25	8	+17	19	
3	Philadelphia Lone Star FC	8	5	1	2	22	12	+10	16	
4	Brockton FC United	8	4	0	4	18	7	+11	12	
5	Lincoln CF	8	3	0	5	10	15	−5	9	
6	Real New York FC	8	3	0	5	17	42	−25	9	
7	Krajisnik SC	8	2	0	6	9	17	−8	6	
8	New Hampshire Bobcats	8	1	0	7	7	26	−19	3	

Rules for classification: 1) Points; 2) Goal difference; 3) Goals scored; 4) Head-to-head points; 5) Head-to-head goal difference; 6) Head-to-head goals scored; 7) Head-to-head matches won; 8) Playoff
(Q) Qualified for the phase indicated

==== Atlanta Caribbean Division standings ====
Pos	Team	Pld	W	D	L	GF	GA	GD	Pts	Qualification
1	Pro-Profile (Q)	9	6	1	2	25	10	+15	19	Qualification for the Atlanta Caribbean Division playoffs
2	Atlanta Generals FC (Q)	9	5	2	2	24	19	+5	17	Qualification for the Atlanta Caribbean Division playoffs
3	Honduras 5 Estrellas	9	4	4	1	32	16	+16	16	Did not participate in the playoffs
4	Club Atletic (Q)	9	4	3	2	31	17	+14	15	Qualification for the Atlanta Caribbean Division playoffs
5	Yardaz FC (Q)	9	4	2	3	20	18	+2	14	Qualification for the Atlanta Caribbean Division playoffs
6	Forest Rovers FC	9	4	1	4	16	28	−12	13	
7	Seas Jamaica FC	9	3	3	3	30	32	−2	12	
8	VaHi Atletic FC	9	2	4	3	16	18	−2	10	
9	KSA Pro	9	2	0	7	17	28	−11	6	
10	FC Stone Mountain Granites	9	1	0	8	13	38	−25	3	

Rules for classification: 1) Points; 2) Goal difference; 3) Goals scored; 4) Head-to-head points; 5) Head-to-head goal difference; 6) Head-to-head goals scored; 7) Head-to-head matches won; 8) Playoff
(Q) Qualified for the phase indicated

==== Florida Central Division East standings ====
Pos	Team	Pld	W	D	L	GF	GA	GD	Pts	Qualification
1	Leg A-Z Soccer International	12	8	1	3	18	13	+5	25	Qualification for the Florida Central Division playoffs
2	OFC Barca	12	7	3	2	34	16	+18	24	Qualification for the Florida Central Division playoffs
3	Macca Ballers FC	12	7	2	3	24	15	+9	23	Qualification for the Florida Central Division playoffs
4	Greater Orlando Soccer Academy	12	6	3	3	33	19	+14	21	Qualification for the Florida Central Division playoffs
5	Clay County SC	11	6	1	4	26	23	+3	19	
6	Deportivo Lake Mary	12	5	1	6	12	21	−9	16	
7	Jacksonville Armada FC Youth Academy	11	2	2	7	14	21	−7	8	
8	Golden Goal Sports SC	12	0	0	12	3	20	−17	0	

Rules for classification: 1) Points; 2) Goal difference; 3) Goals scored; 4) Head-to-head points; 5) Head-to-head goal difference; 6) Head-to-head goals scored; 7) Head-to-head matches won; 8) Playoff

==== Florida Central Division West standings ====
Pos	Team	Pld	W	D	L	GF	GA	GD	Pts	Qualification
1	Tropics SC	11	11	0	0	37	4	+33	33	Qualification for the Florida Central Division playoffs
2	St. Petersburg FC Aztecs	11	8	2	1	26	11	+15	26	Qualification for the Florida Central Division playoffs
3	Sporting Orlando	12	7	1	4	21	18	+3	22	Qualification for the Florida Central Division playoffs
4	The Institute FC	12	4	3	5	27	22	+5	15	Qualification for the Florida Central Division playoffs
5	Huracan FC	12	3	3	6	16	26	−10	12	
6	Inter Orlando Academy	11	4	0	7	14	31	−17	12	
7	Interunited Academy	12	3	0	9	12	27	−15	9	
8	Sports Paradize Soccer Academy	11	1	0	10	6	36	−30	3	

Rules for classification: 1) Points; 2) Goal difference; 3) Goals scored; 4) Head-to-head points; 5) Head-to-head goal difference; 6) Head-to-head goals scored; 7) Head-to-head matches won; 8) Playoff

==== Florida Dade/Broward Division standings ====
Pos	scope="col" width=200 /Broward standings|Team	Pld	W	D	L	GF	GA	GD	Pts	Qualification
1	Red Force FC	11	8	1	2	25	15	+10	25	Qualification for the Florida South Division playoffs
2	Miami Sun FC	10	7	1	2	37	14	+23	22	Qualification for the Florida South Division playoffs
3	Florida Soccer Soldiers	8	7	0	1	22	1	+21	21	Qualification for the Florida South Division playoffs
4	UD Miami FC	11	6	2	3	16	10	+6	20	Qualification for the Florida South Division playoffs
5	Miami United FC	10	6	1	3	26	13	+13	19	Qualification for the Florida South Division playoffs
6	Hialeah City FC	11	5	3	3	20	29	−9	18	Qualification for the Florida South Division playoffs
7	Florida Soccer Soldiers 2	10	4	3	3	16	13	+3	15	Qualification for the Florida South Division playoffs
8	Atletico Miami CF	11	4	2	5	17	33	−16	14	Qualification for the Florida South Division playoffs
9	Miami AC	10	4	1	5	21	25	−4	13	
10	Miami Dade FC	10	2	1	7	12	23	−11	7	
11	Atletico Barra Soccer Academy	11	1	0	10	5	28	−23	3	
12	Hebraica Miami FC	11	0	1	10	5	18	−13	1	

Rules for classification: 1) Points; 2) Goal difference; 3) Goals scored; 4) Head-to-head points; 5) Head-to-head goal difference; 6) Head-to-head goals scored; 7) Head-to-head matches won; 8) Playoff

==== Florida Palm Beach Division standings ====
Pos	Team	Pld	W	D	L	GF	GA	GD	Pts	Qualification
1	Hurricane FC	11	8	2	1	23	10	+13	26	Qualification for the Florida South Division playoffs
2	Boca Raton FC	11	8	1	2	25	13	+12	25	Qualification for the Florida South Division playoffs
3	PSL United SC	11	7	1	3	28	14	+14	22	Qualification for the Florida South Division playoffs
4	Palm Beach Spartans	11	7	1	3	32	26	+6	22	Qualification for the Florida South Division playoffs
5	International Soccer Association	10	5	0	5	21	23	−2	15	Qualification for the Florida South Division playoffs
6	Florida Wolves FC	11	5	0	6	14	28	−14	15	Qualification for the Florida South Division playoffs
7	FSI Vultures FC	11	3	1	7	26	20	+6	10	Qualification for the Florida South Division playoffs
8	Palm Beach Breakers	10	3	1	6	14	13	+1	10	Qualification for the Florida South Division playoffs
9	FSI Vultures FC Black	11	3	1	7	13	26	−13	10	
10	Palm Beach Flames SC	11	1	0	10	21	44	−23	3	

Rules for classification: 1) Points; 2) Goal difference; 3) Goals scored; 4) Head-to-head points; 5) Head-to-head goal difference; 6) Head-to-head goals scored; 7) Head-to-head matches won; 8) Playoff

==== Mid-Atlantic Division North standings ====
Pos	Team	Pld	W	D	L	GF	GA	GD	Pts	Qualification
1	World Class Premier (Q)	10	9	0	1	43	6	+37	27	Qualification for the Mid-Atlantic Division playoffs
2	Baltimore United FC (Q)	10	8	0	2	35	12	+23	24	Qualification for the Mid-Atlantic Division playoffs
3	Germantown City FC	10	5	1	4	39	22	+17	16	
4	Northern Virginia FC	10	4	1	5	23	23	0	13	
5	FC Millennium	10	2	0	8	6	53	−47	6	
6	Catrachos De INCAEF	10	1	0	9	5	35	−30	3	

Rules for classification: 1) Points; 2) Goal difference; 3) Goals scored; 4) Head-to-head points; 5) Head-to-head goal difference; 6) Head-to-head goals scored; 7) Head-to-head matches won; 8) Playoff
(Q) Qualified for the phase indicated

==== Mid-Atlantic Division South A standings ====
Pos	Team	Pld	W	D	L	GF	GA	GD	Pts	Qualification
1	Del Sol FC	8	7	0	1	14	5	+9	21	Did not participate in the playoffs
2	San Lee FC	8	5	1	2	20	5	+15	16	Qualification for the Mid-Atlantic Division playoffs
3	Atletico Olanchano FC	6	2	2	2	6	6	0	8	
4	Goldsboro Strike Eagles FC	8	1	1	6	7	19	−12	4	
5	Broncos United FC	6	1	0	5	6	18	−12	3	

Rules for classification: 1) Points; 2) Goal difference; 3) Goals scored; 4) Head-to-head points; 5) Head-to-head goal difference; 6) Head-to-head goals scored; 7) Head-to-head matches won; 8) Playoff

==== Mid-Atlantic Division South B standings ====
Pos	Team	Pld	W	D	L	GF	GA	GD	Pts	Qualification
1	Soda City FC (Q)	10	8	1	1	31	9	+22	25	Qualification for the Mid-Atlantic Division playoffs
2	Charleston United SC	10	6	1	3	26	20	+6	19	
3	LSA Pro	10	6	0	4	14	9	+5	18	
4	Lowcountry United FC	9	3	2	4	14	16	−2	11	
5	Savannah Clovers FC	10	2	1	7	11	29	−18	7	
6	FC Cardinals	9	1	1	7	9	22	−13	4	

Rules for classification: 1) Points; 2) Goal difference; 3) Goals scored; 4) Head-to-head points; 5) Head-to-head goal difference; 6) Head-to-head goals scored; 7) Head-to-head matches won; 8) Playoff
(Q) Qualified for the phase indicated

==== Southwest Conference standings ====
Pos	Team	Pld	W	D	L	GF	GA	GD	Pts
1	Southwest FC	6	5	0	1	17	7	+10	15
2	High Plains Drifters SC	5	4	1	0	13	4	+9	13
3	Sporting AZ FC	4	4	0	0	9	1	+8	12
4	FC Grande	6	2	2	2	12	9	+3	8
5	Tapatio FC	5	1	1	3	7	10	−3	4
6	MSC United	5	1	0	4	8	14	−6	3
7	Inter City SC	3	1	0	2	3	9	−6	3
8	Southwest FC U21	3	0	0	3	1	7	−6	0
9	FPS FC	3	0	0	3	2	11	−9	0

Updated to match(es) played on May 26, 2019. Source:
Rules for classification: 1) Points; 2) Goal difference; 3) Goals scored; 4) Head-to-head points; 5) Head-to-head goal difference; 6) Head-to-head goals scored; 7) Head-to-head matches won; 8) Playoff

==== SoCal Division North standings ====
Pos	Team	Pld	W	D	L	GF	GA	GD	Pts	Qualification
1	Cal FC (Q)	11	9	1	1	53	15	+38	28	Qualification for the SoCal Division playoffs semifinals
2	L.A. Wolves FC	12	5	4	3	27	18	+9	19	Qualification for the SoCal Division playoffs quarterfinals
3	Sporting San Fernando	12	5	4	3	25	28	−3	19	Qualification for the SoCal Division playoffs quarterfinals
4	LA 10 FC	12	4	4	4	26	22	+4	16	
5	FC Santa Clarita	12	5	1	6	16	25	−9	16	
6	Lionside FC	11	3	2	6	17	28	−11	11	
7	Valley United SC	12	1	2	9	13	41	−28	5	
8	Kern County Mustangs FC	0	0	0	0	0	0	0	0	Withdrew

Rules for classification: 1) Points; 2) Goal difference; 3) Goals scored; 4) Head-to-head points; 5) Head-to-head goal difference; 6) Head-to-head goals scored; 7) Head-to-head matches won; 8) Playoff
(Q) Qualified for the phase indicated

==== SoCal Division South standings ====
Pos	Team	Pld	W	D	L	GF	GA	GD	Pts	Qualification
1	Newcastle United FC (Q)	14	11	1	2	37	17	+20	34	Qualification for the SoCal Division playoffs semifinals
2	Santa Ana Winds FC (Q)	14	9	2	3	32	17	+15	29	Qualification for the SoCal Division playoffs quarterfinals
3	Cuervos FC (Q)	14	8	1	5	43	30	+13	25	Qualification for the SoCal Division playoffs quarterfinals
4	San Diego Premier SC	14	7	2	5	30	20	+10	23	
5	Inland Empire FC	14	5	0	9	31	44	−13	15	
6	Gremio FC SD	14	4	1	9	23	35	−12	13	
7	L.A. Galaxy OC PSC	14	4	1	9	19	31	−12	13	
8	City Legends FC (R)	14	4	0	10	29	50	−21	12	Relegation to the Championship

Rules for classification: 1) Points; 2) Goal difference; 3) Goals scored; 4) Head-to-head points; 5) Head-to-head goal difference; 6) Head-to-head goals scored; 7) Head-to-head matches won; 8) Playoff
(Q) Qualified for the phase indicated; (R) Relegated

==== Wild West Division standings ====
Pos	Team	Pld	W	D	L	GF	GA	GD	Pts	Qualification
1	Contra Costa United (Q)	10	9	0	1	31	9	+22	27	Qualification for the Wild West Division playoffs
2	Nevada Coyotes FC (Q)	10	7	1	2	36	16	+20	22	Qualification for the Wild West Division playoffs
3	Pajaro Valley United (Q)	10	7	1	2	27	22	+5	22	Qualification for the Wild West Division playoffs
4	AFC Hearts of San Francisco (Q)	10	6	0	4	21	20	+1	18	Qualification for the Wild West Division playoffs
5	JASA RWC (Q)	10	5	2	3	25	15	+10	17	Qualification for the Wild West Division playoffs
6	San Leandro United FC (Q)	10	4	2	4	17	17	0	14	Qualification for the Wild West Division playoffs
7	Redding Royals FC (Q)	10	4	1	5	18	24	−6	13	Qualification for the Wild West Division playoffs
8	Real San Jose (Q)	10	3	1	6	12	15	−3	10	Qualification for the Wild West Division playoffs
9	Vacaville Elite	10	3	1	6	13	23	−10	10	
10	Oakland Stompers	10	2	1	7	14	27	−13	7	
11	Chico City Rangers FC	10	0	0	10	2	28	−26	0	

Rules for classification: 1) Points; 2) Goal difference; 3) Goals scored; 4) Head-to-head points; 5) Head-to-head goal difference; 6) Head-to-head goals scored; 7) Head-to-head matches won; 8) Playoff
(Q) Qualified for the phase indicated

=== Playoffs ===
==== Central Conference playoffs ====
Round of 16
July 2 – John Crain Field
N2 OKC 1889 FC	3
N3 Reign FK	1
June 29/July 1 – University High School
H2 FC Waco	2
H3 Coyotes FC	1
July 5 – Sporti USA
S2 San Antonio Corinthians	2
S3 Houston FC	0

Quarterfinals
July 6 – University High School
N2 OKC 1889 FC	3
H2 FC Waco	1
July 10 – Polytechnic High School
N1 Inocentes FC	4
S2 San Antonio Corinthians FC	1

Semifinals
July 10 – Matias Almeyda Training Center
S1 Almeyda FC	0
N2 OKC 1889 FC	2
July 13 – UT-San Antonio
H1 San Antonio Runners SC	2
N1 Inocentes FC	5

Final
July 17 – Scarborough-Handley Field
N2 OKC 1889 FC (a.e.t.)	2
N1 Inocentes FC	1

==== Midwest Conference playoffs ====
Semifinals
July 13 – Heartland Value Fund Stad.
C Milwaukee Bavarian SC	10
W Vlora City FC	1
July 13 – Heartland Value Fund Stad.
S Joliet United SC	3
E Carpathia FC	0

Final
July 14 – Heartland Value Fund Stad.
C Milwaukee Bavarian SC	3
S Joliet United SC	1

==== Mountain Conference playoffs ====
Semifinals
June 29 – Regional Athletic Complex
1 San Juan FC	1
4 Boise Cutthroats FC	3
June 29 – Zions Bank Stadium
2 Utah Murcielagos	3
3 Gordis FC	0

Final
July 6 – Zions Bank Stadium
4 Boise Cutthroats FC	0
2 Utah Murcielagos	2

==== Atlanta Caribbean Division playoffs ====
Semifinals
June 23 – South Gwinnett Park
1 Pro-Profile	3
5 Yardaz FC (a.e.t.)	4
June 23 – South Gwinnett Park
2 Atlanta Generals FC	0
4 Club Atletic	4

Final
June 30 – South Gwinnett Park
5 Yardaz FC	1
4 Club Atletic	2

==== Florida Central Division playoffs ====
Quarterfinals
June 19 – Lake Myrtle Sports Complex
W1 Tropics SC	3
E4 GOSA	0
June 16 – Celebration High School
E2 OFC Barca	1(5)
W3 Sporting Orlando	1(6)
June 14 – ESPN Wide World of Sports
E1 Leg A-Z Soccer	3
W4 The Institute FC	2
June 15 – Oldsmar Sports Complex
W2 St. Petersburg FC Aztecs	3
E3 Macca Ballers FC	4

Semifinals
June 26 – Lake Myrtle Sports Complex
W1 Tropics SC	3
W3 Sporting Orlando	0
June 22 – Veterans Memorial Park
E1 Leg A-Z Soccer	2
E3 Macca Ballers FC	4

Final
June 29 – Lake Myrtle Sports Complex
W1 Tropics SC	3
E3 Macca Ballers FC	1

==== Florida South Division playoffs ====
Round of 16
June 9 – Tropical Park Stadium
DB1 Red Force FC	3
PB8 Palm Beach Breakers	2
June 9 – Ronald L Book Stadium
PB4 Palm Beach Spartans	1
DB5 Miami United FC	0
June 11 – Samuel Friedland Park
PB2 Boca Raton FC	2
DB7 Florida Soccer Soldiers 2	1
June 9 – Tropical Park Stadium
DB3 Florida Soccer Soldiers	10
PB6 Florida Wolves	0
June 9 – Hilltopper Stadium
PB1 Hurricane FC	0
DB8 Atletico Miami CF	1
June 9 – Orange Bowl Field
DB4 UD Miami FC	4
PB5 International Soccer Assoc.	3
June 8 – Kendall Soccer Park
DB2 Miami Sun FC	8
PB7 FSI Vultures FC	0
June 9 – Lawnwood Stadium
PB3 PSL United SC	3(3)
DB6 Hialeah City FC	3(4)

Quarterfinals
June 18 – Tropical Park Stadium
DB1 Red Force FC	4
PB4 Palm Beach Spartans	1
June 20 – Amelia Earhart Park
PB2 Boca Raton FC	2(3)
DB3 Florida Soccer Soldiers	2(2)
June 19 – Kendall Soccer Park
DB8 Atletico Miami CF	0(4)
DB4 UD Miami FC	0(3)
June 15 – Kendall Soccer Park
DB2 Miami Sun FC	2(2)
DB6 Hialeah City FC	2(4)

Semifinals
June 23 – Kendall Soccer Park
DB1 Red Force FC	1(6)
PB2 Boca Raton FC	1(7)
June 22 – Kendall Soccer Park
DB8 Atletico Miami CF	1
DB6 Hialeah City FC	3

Final
June 30 – Samuel Friedland Park
PB2 Boca Raton FC	0(6)
DB6 Hialeah City FC	0(5)

==== Mid-Atlantic Division playoffs ====
Semifinals
June 22 – Bryan Multi-Sport Complex
N1 World Class Premier	4
SA San Lee FC	0
June 22 – Bryan Multi-Sport Complex
SB Soda City FC	1
N2 Baltimore United FC	3

Final
June 23 – Bryan Multi-Sport Complex
N1 World Class Premier (a.e.t.)	2
N2 Baltimore United FC	1

==== Southwest Conference playoffs ====
Semifinals
July 6 – West Texas A&M University
1 High Plains Drifters SC	3
4 Inter City SC	1
July 6 – Eastside Sports Complex
2 Southwest FC	2
3 FC Grande	1

Final
July 13 – West Texas A&M University
1 High Plains Drifters SC	2
2 Southwest FC	3

==== SoCal Division playoffs ====
Quarterfinals
June 15 – Lake Forest Sports Complex
S2 Santa Ana Winds FC	2
N3 Sporting San Fernando	0
June 16 – Los Angeles Harbor College
N2 L.A. Wolves FC	1
S3 Cuervos FC	5

Semifinals
June 23 – Los Angeles Harbor College
N1 Cal FC (a.e.t.)	2
S2 Santa Ana Winds FC	1
June 23 – Lake Forest Sports Complex
S1 Newcastle United FC	1
S3 Cuervos FC	4

Final
June 30 – Los Angeles Harbor College
N1 Cal FC	1
S3 Cuervos FC	3

==== Wild West Division playoffs ====
Quarterfinals
June 22 – Northgate High School
1 Contra Costa United	5
8 Real San Jose	1
June 22 – City College of San Francisco
4 Hearts of San Francisco	2
5 JASA RWC	3
June 22 – Damonte Ranch High School
2 Nevada Coyotes FC	w/o
7 Redding Royals FC
June 22 – Watsonville High School
3 Pajaro Valley United	2
6 San Leandro United FC	0

Semifinals
June 29 – Northgate High School
1 Contra Costa United	1
5 JASA RWC	0
June 29 – Dayton High School
2 Nevada Coyotes FC	2
3 Pajaro Valley United	3

Final
July 6 – Northgate High School
1 Contra Costa United	3(3)
3 Pajaro Valley United	3(5)

==== National playoffs ====
Conference Semifinal/Final
July 13 – The Master's University
SC Cuervos FC	0(4)
WW Pajaro Valley United	0(5)
July 6 – Lake Myrtle Sports Complex
FC Tropics SC	3
FS Boca Raton FC	1

National Quarterfinals & Conference Final
July 20 – Zions Bank Stadium
W Pajaro Valley United	0
M Utah Murcielagos	5
July 20 – Eastside Sports Complex
SW Southwest FC	4
C OKC 1889 FC	0
July 21 – Chelmsford High School
MW Milwaukee Bavarian SC	5
NE Mass United FC	1
July 13 – Memorial Stadium
MA World Class Premier	1
FC Tropics SC	2

National Semifinals
July 27 – Kangaroo Stadium
M Utah Murcielagos	3
SW Southwest FC	2
July 27 – Kangaroo Stadium
MW Milwaukee Bavarian SC	1
SE Tropics SC (a.e.t.)	2

National Final
July 28 – Kangaroo Stadium
M Utah Murcielagos	2(3)
SE Tropics SC	2(4)

== Championship ==
=== Team changes ===
==== Incoming teams ====
Team	Division	Notes	Ref
AC Miracle Hill	SoCal South	New club	
Alta California Sol	SoCal North	New senior team of youth club	
Arlington FC	Central North	New senior team of youth club	
Astoria Knights	Patriot	Expansion	
Aztecas SC	Florida Central	Expansion	
Boston Siege FC	Patriot	Relegated from Pro Premier	
Dallas City FC	Central North	Relegated from Pro Premier	
Deportivo Lake Mary II	Florida Central	New reserve team of Deportivo Lake Mary	
FC Fort Worth	Central North	Expansion	
FC Sharp Keys	Central North	Joined from Fort Worth Adult Soccer Association	
Injen Total Football USA	SoCal South	Joined from local amateur play	
Instituto Atletico FC	Florida Central	Relegated from Pro Premier	
International SC	Patriot	Relegated from Pro Premier	
L.A. Wolves FC Reserves	SoCal South	Returned from hiatus; last played 2017 Fall	
Juve-Pro Soccer	Patriot	Relegated from Pro Premier	
Lee Vista FC	Florida Central	Expansion	
Lobos FC	SoCal North	Expansion	
Long Beach City FC	SoCal North	Returned from hiatus; last played 2017 Fall	
Los Laguneros FC	SoCal South	Expansion	
MAFO Inland Wolves FC	SoCal South	New club	
North Texas Legends FC	Central North	New club	
OC Real Force SC	SoCal South	Relegated from Pro Premier	
Ontario Fury II	SoCal South	Returned from hiatus; last played 2018 Spring; relegated from Pro Premier	
Panamerican FC	SoCal North	Relegated from Pro Premier	
Red Sharks FC	SoCal North	Expansion	
Rosario Central USA	Florida Central	Expansion	
Rose City FC	SoCal North	New club	
Safira FC	Patriot	Relegated from Pro Premier	
Santa Monica United FC	SoCal North	New senior team of youth club	
Sporting Hartford FC	Patriot	Expansion	
Terrell FC	Central North	Relegated from Pro Premier	
USA Soccer Stars FC	SoCal North	Returned from hiatus; last played 2018 Spring	
Unations FC	Patriot	Relegated from Pro Premier	
Valley Lions FC	SoCal North	Expansion	
Weatherford FC	Central North	New club	

==== Outgoing teams ====
Team	Final Division	Notes
Anaheim FC	SoCal South	Folded
Bell Gardens FC	SoCal North	Left league
CD Miguelense	Florida Central	Left league
City Legends FC	SoCal South	Promoted to Pro Premier
High Desert FC	SoCal North	On hiatus
Inland Empire FC	SoCal South	Promoted to Pro Premier
LA 10 FC	SoCal North	Promoted to Pro Premier
Millos United FC	Florida Central	Left league
Nationwide FC	Florida Central	Left league
San Fernando Valley FC	SoCal North	On hiatus
Santa Ana Winds FC II	SoCal South	Folded
Sporting San Fernando II	SoCal North	Folded
The A Team	Florida Central	Left league
Tiburones Rojos USA	SoCal North	Left league

=== Division changes ===
- The Central North Division added a Championship level.

=== Competition format ===
- Central Conference: Only the North Division features a Championship level. Teams play a double round robin for 12 matches.
- Southeast Conference: The Atlanta Caribbean Division features only at the Championship level and does not promote to the Pro Premier. Among divisions with Pro Premier levels, only the Florida Central Division features a Championship level.
  - Atlanta Caribbean Division: Teams play a single round robin for nine matches.
  - Florida Central Division: Teams play a double round robin for 14 matches. All eight teams qualify for the playoffs.
- Western Conference: Only the SoCal Division features a Championship level. Teams are divided into North and South sections. Each section plays a single round robin for 13 matches. The regular season champion of each section is promoted. The second place team in each section hosts the third place team in the other section in a playoff match to determine two further promoted teams.

=== Standings ===
==== Central North Division standings ====
Pos	Team	Pld	W	D	L	GF	GA	GD	Pts	Qualification
1	Arlington FC (P)	12	9	1	2	36	20	+16	28	Promotion to the Pro Premier
2	Weatherford FC (P)	12	9	0	3	48	15	+33	27	Promotion to the Pro Premier
3	FC Fort Worth	12	5	1	6	28	31	−3	16	
4	Dallas City FC	11	3	3	5	19	26	−7	12	
5	Terrell FC	11	4	0	7	16	42	−26	12	
6	FC Sharp Keys	11	3	2	6	23	24	−1	11	Relegation to League One
7	North Texas Legends FC	9	2	1	6	15	27	−12	7	Relegation to League One

Updated to match(es) played on June 23, 2019. Source:
Rules for classification: 1) Points; 2) Goal difference; 3) Goals scored; 4) Head-to-head points; 5) Head-to-head goal difference; 6) Head-to-head goals scored; 7) Head-to-head matches won; 8) Playoff
(P) Promoted

==== Patriot Division standings ====
Pos	Team	Pld	W	D	L	GF	GA	GD	Pts
1	Safira FC	7	7	0	0	27	7	+20	21
2	Juve-Pro Soccer	5	4	0	1	20	5	+15	12
3	Astoria Knights FC	6	4	0	2	15	6	+9	12
4	Sporting Hartford FC	6	2	1	3	13	16	−3	7
5	Unations FC	6	2	1	3	10	20	−10	7
6	International SC	6	2	0	4	6	8	−2	6
7	Boston Siege FC	8	0	0	8	0	29	−29	0

Updated to match(es) played on June 22, 2019. Source:
Rules for classification: 1) Points; 2) Goal difference; 3) Goals scored; 4) Head-to-head points; 5) Head-to-head goal difference; 6) Head-to-head goals scored; 7) Head-to-head matches won; 8) Playoff

==== Florida Central Division standings ====
Pos	Team	Pld	W	D	L	GF	GA	GD	Pts	Qualification
1	Rosario Central USA	14	11	1	2	52	20	+32	34	Qualification for the Florida Central Division promotional playoffs
2	Independiente FC	14	10	1	3	42	22	+20	31	Qualification for the Florida Central Division promotional playoffs
3	Aztecas SC	14	9	2	3	46	21	+25	29	Qualification for the Florida Central Division promotional playoffs
4	Lee Vista FC	14	7	3	4	31	27	+4	24	Qualification for the Florida Central Division promotional playoffs
5	Instituto Atletico FC	14	5	2	7	30	25	+5	17	Qualification for the Florida Central Division promotional playoffs
6	Ginger Mill SC	14	5	0	9	23	35	−12	15	Qualification for the Florida Central Division promotional playoffs
7	Deportivo Lake Mary II	14	3	1	10	23	38	−15	10	Qualification for the Florida Central Division promotional playoffs
8	The Institute FC II	14	1	0	13	8	67	−59	3	Qualification for the Florida Central Division promotional playoffs

Rules for classification: 1) Points; 2) Goal difference; 3) Goals scored; 4) Head-to-head points; 5) Head-to-head goal difference; 6) Head-to-head goals scored; 7) Head-to-head matches won; 8) Playoff

==== SoCal Division North standings ====
Pos	Team	Pld	W	D	L	GF	GA	GD	Pts	Qualification
1	Alta California Sol (P)	13	11	1	1	36	12	+24	34	Promotion to the Pro Premier
2	USA Soccer Stars FC	13	10	3	0	38	14	+24	33	Qualification for the SoCal Division promotional playoffs
3	Warriors FC	13	11	0	2	43	24	+19	33	Qualification for the SoCal Division promotional playoffs
4	Santa Monica United FC	13	10	2	1	44	11	+33	32	
5	Red Sharks FC	13	8	1	4	33	25	+8	25	
6	Valley Lions FC	13	7	1	5	27	25	+2	22	
7	Newhall Premier FC	13	5	2	6	33	25	+8	17	
8	Revolution FC	13	5	1	7	27	26	+1	16	
9	Xolos Academy L.A.	13	5	1	7	15	26	−11	16	
10	Lobos FC	13	3	1	9	21	32	−11	10	
11	CD Independiente	13	3	0	10	19	28	−9	9	
12	Long Beach City FC	13	3	0	10	12	37	−25	9	
13	Rose City FC	13	2	1	10	17	64	−47	7	
14	Panamerican FC	13	1	0	12	7	23	−16	3	

Rules for classification: 1) Points; 2) Goal difference; 3) Goals scored; 4) Head-to-head points; 5) Head-to-head goal difference; 6) Head-to-head goals scored; 7) Head-to-head matches won; 8) Playoff
(P) Promoted

==== SoCal Division South standings ====
Pos	Team	Pld	W	D	L	GF	GA	GD	Pts	Qualification
1	Injen Total Football USA (P)	13	11	2	0	44	17	+27	35	Promotion to the Pro Premier
2	MAFO Inland Wolves FC (O, P)	13	9	2	2	51	19	+32	29	Qualification for the SoCal Division promotional playoffs
3	Disciples FC (O, P)	13	9	2	2	49	20	+29	29	Qualification for the SoCal Division promotional playoffs
4	California Rush SC	13	9	1	3	33	23	+10	28	
5	Ontario Fury II	13	7	2	4	56	25	+31	23	
6	Newport FC	13	6	2	5	33	46	−13	20	
7	SoCal Troop FC	13	5	4	4	36	20	+16	19	
8	AC Miracle Hill	13	5	3	5	30	30	0	18	
9	Anaheim Legacy FC	13	5	2	6	36	28	+8	17	
10	OC Real Force SC	13	4	2	7	33	42	−9	14	
11	Toros Neza USA	13	3	4	6	26	37	−11	13	
12	L.A. Wolves FC Reserves	13	2	2	9	30	46	−16	8	
13	Fontana International SC	13	1	1	11	12	54	−42	4	
14	Los Laguneros FC	13	0	1	12	11	73	−62	1	

Rules for classification: 1) Points; 2) Goal difference; 3) Goals scored; 4) Head-to-head points; 5) Head-to-head goal difference; 6) Head-to-head goals scored; 7) Head-to-head matches won; 8) Playoff
(O) Play-off winners; (P) Promoted

=== Promotional Playoffs ===
==== Florida Central Division playoffs ====
Quarterfinals
May 22 – ESPN Wide World of Sports
1 Rosario Central USA	5
8 The Institute FC II	1
May 26 – Brandon Coates Park
4 Lee Vista FC	3
6 Ginger Mill SC	4
May 26 – Brandon Coates Park
2 Independiente FC	1
7 Deportivo Lake Mary II	3
May 21 – ESPN Wide World of Sports
3 Aztecas SC	0
5 Instituto Atletico FC	3

Semifinals
June 2 – Brandon Coates Park
1 Rosario Central USA	W
6 Ginger Mill SC	L
June 2 – Brandon Coates Park
7 Deportivo Lake Mary II	W
5 Instituto Atletico FC	L

Final
June 9 – Brandon Coates Park
6 Ginger Mill SC	0
5 Instituto Atletico FC	1

==== SoCal Division playoffs ====
Final
June 8 – Glendale Sports Complex
N2 USA Soccer Stars FC	2
S3 Disciples FC	3

Final
June 9 – Grand Terrace High School
S2 MAFO Inland Wolves FC	1
N3 Warriors FC	0

== League One ==
=== Team changes ===
==== Incoming teams ====
Team	Division	Notes	Ref
Aguilas FC	Central North	Expansion	
Azul City Premier FC	Central North	Joined from Fort Worth Adult Soccer Association	
FF Premier	Central North	Joined from North Texas Premier Soccer Association	
Lone Star Republic	Central North	Expansion	
Somerset SC	Central North	Expansion	

=== Division changes ===
- The Central North Division added a League One level.

=== Competition format ===
- Central Conference: Only the North Division features a League One level. Teams play a triple round robin for 12 matches.
- Western Conference: Only the SoCal Division features a League One level. Teams play a double round robin for 14 matches.

=== Standings ===
==== Central North Division standings ====
Pos	Team	Pld	W	D	L	GF	GA	GD	Pts	Qualification
1	FF Premier (P)	12	10	1	1	60	12	+48	31	Promotion to the Championship
2	Lone Star Republic (P)	11	8	1	2	34	14	+20	25	Promotion to the Championship
3	Azul City Premier FC	10	4	0	6	22	38	−16	12	
4	Somerset SC	10	4	0	6	18	34	−16	12	
5	Aguilas FC	11	0	0	11	1	37	−36	0	

Updated to match(es) played on June 22, 2019. Source:
Rules for classification: 1) Points; 2) Goal difference; 3) Goals scored; 4) Head-to-head points; 5) Head-to-head goal difference; 6) Head-to-head goals scored; 7) Head-to-head matches won; 8) Playoff
(P) Promoted

==== SoCal Division standings ====
Pos	Team	Pld	W	D	L	GF	GA	GD	Pts
1	SC Verdugos	14	10	1	3	47	23	+24	31
2	Alianza USF	12	9	3	0	39	15	+24	30
3	Internazionale	13	8	1	4	43	30	+13	25
4	Rebels FC	10	6	2	2	22	12	+10	20
5	Valley United SC Blast	13	5	1	7	26	38	−12	16
6	AS Los Angeles	14	3	2	9	27	40	−13	11
7	LA 10 FC Reserves	14	3	1	10	31	54	−23	10
8	Burbank FC	14	2	1	11	17	40	−23	7

Rules for classification: 1) Points; 2) Goal difference; 3) Goals scored; 4) Head-to-head points; 5) Head-to-head goal difference; 6) Head-to-head goals scored; 7) Head-to-head matches won; 8) Playoff
