= Oklahoma City 1889 FC =

Oklahoma City 1889
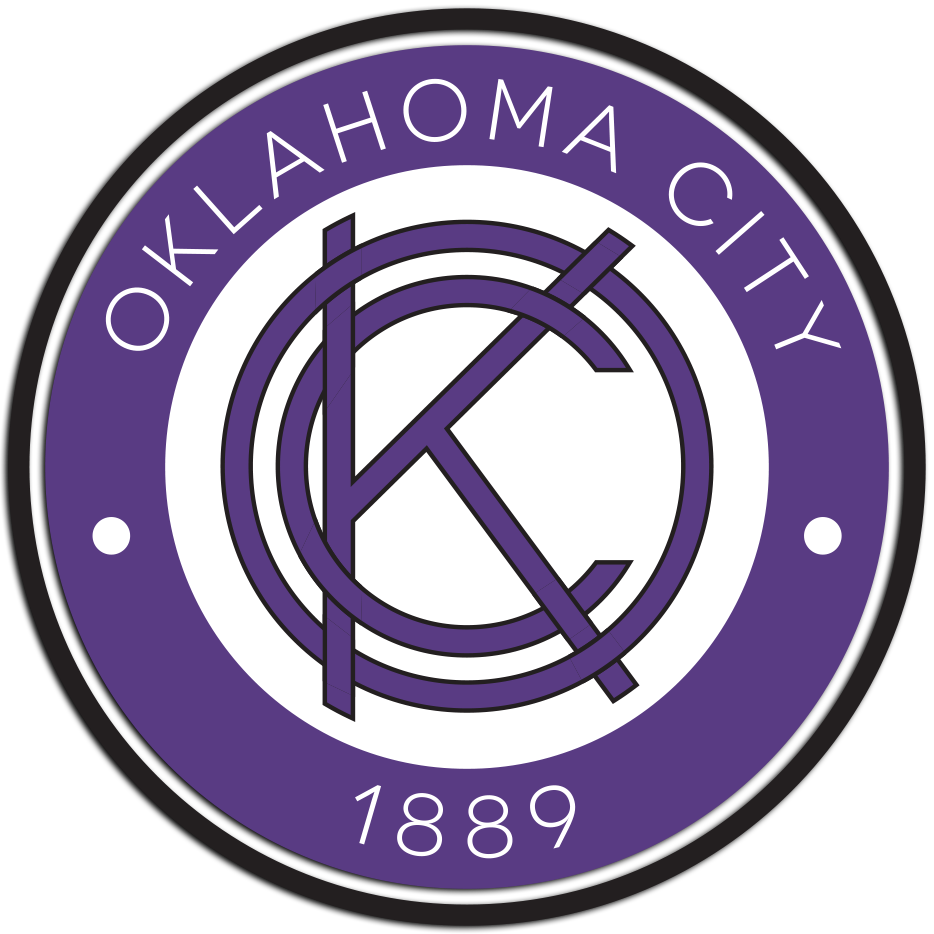
- Full name: Oklahoma City 1889 Football Club
- Nicknames: The Imps, Fighting Imps
- Founded: February 21, 2017; 9 years ago
- Stadium: Brian Harvey Field (Oklahoma City University)
- Owner(s): Dustin Hooker, Mark Moore
- Manager: Neil Hilton, James Roberson
- League: The League for Clubs
- Website: okc1889.com
Home colours	Away colours

Oklahoma City 1889 Football Club, also known as OKC 1889 FC, is an American men's soccer club based in Oklahoma City, Oklahoma. The club is a member of The League for Clubs, a semi-professional soccer league in US Soccer that includes qualification for and participation in the US Open Cup. The club is a former member of the NPSL and also the UPSL.

== History ==
The club's founding season in 2017 consisted of a summer schedule of friendlies only where the team competed under the name "OKC Fighting Imps" due to complications with joining a league.

In the 2018 regular season, they finished 3rd in the UPSL Central Conference North Division and missed playoffs by one spot behind Dallas Elite FC and champions Inocentes FC.

In the 2019 regular season, they finished 2nd in the UPSL Central Conference Pro-Premier (1st tier) North Division behind Inocentes FC and qualified for Central Conference playoffs. The Central Conference playoff run includes a 3–1 victory against Reign FK, a 3–1 victory against FC Waco, a 2–0 victory against Matias Almeyda FC, and was capped off when Imps won the Central Conference championship 2–1 in extra time against Inocentes FC. The season ended with a 4–0 loss to Southwest FC in El Paso in the UPSL National Quarterfinal. Niall Burley was selected to the UPSL Best XI Second Team for the Spring season.

The 2020 season was postponed due to the outbreak of COVID-19. The Imps did compete virtually instead in the 2020 Lower League eCup, a competition that took place online in FIFA 20 between 120+ third tier or lower teams in the United States. OKC 1889 FC was represented in the Xbox One tournament by Twitter user @LFC_RJ who made it through the group stage and on to the Round of 32 where he lost to FC Tucson by an aggregate of 4–1 over two legs.

The Imps announced on March 24, 2021, that they will compete in Heartland Conference of the NPSL South Region for the 2021 season. They finished third in the 2021 regular season behind Tulsa Athletic and champions Demize NPSL, and qualified for the Heartland playoffs. The 2021 playoff run includes a loss to Tulsa Athletic 5–4 in penalties after the match finished 2–2 after extra time. Callum Shepherd earned NPSL Team of the month honors in May. Fabian Forisch and Muhammad Bilal were selected on the NPSL Heartland Conference XI team. Bilal was also selected to the South Region XI.

On March 16, 2022, the Imps announced that Niall Burley would transition from being a player on the squad to being the manager of the club. The 2022 Heartland Conference regular season ended with the Imps in 2nd place behind Tulsa Athletic which qualified them for the Heartland playoffs. This was the first season that the second ever manager of the club, Niall Burley, was at the helm. Burley led the team to the most successful regular season campaign in club history by winning 8 out of 12 matches. The 2022 playoff run included a 4–2 home win against Sunflower State FC. The Imps ultimately lost in the Heartland Conference final to Tulsa Athletic 5–1.

Before the 2023 season, the NPSL announced that the Heartland Conference was moved to the Midwest Region. The Imps finished the 2023 Regular Season 2nd place by only one point in the Heartland conference behind Tulsa Athletic. The 2023 playoff run included a 2–1 Heartland semi-final win against Kansas City Sol. The season ended in a 2–1 loss to Tulsa Athletic in the Heartland Conference final.

The club announced on March 23, 2024 that former player and assistant coach Harvey Paul would take the reins as the manager. For the first time in club history, the Imps won the regular season title which was also the playoff title due to a smaller conference. They were defeated 4–1 on the road at West Texas FC in the South Region semifinal.

In November 2024, The League for Clubs announced that OKC 1889 had joined the league and will compete in the Mid-American conference of the Central Region. Before the 2025 season, the club announced the appointment of two co-head coaches, Neil Hilton and James Roberson. The Imps finished 2nd behind Tulsa Athletic in the Mid-American conference and qualified for the conference final, but the match was cancelled due to severe weather with Tulsa being named conference champions. Kareem Williams, Shonosuke, and Pedro Belmont were named to TLFC Mid-American team of the season.

== Rivalries ==
=== War for I-44 ===
Rivalry with Tulsa Athletic in Tulsa, Oklahoma.

Record
Won	Drawn	Lost	GF	GA
4	1	10	17	30

Results
Date	Competition	Winner	Score	Location
June 25, 2025	TLFC	OKC 1889	2–0	Oklahoma City, OK
June 11, 2025	TLFC	Tulsa Athletic	0–2	Tulsa, OK
May 31, 2025	TLFC	Tulsa Athletic	1–2	Oklahoma City, OK
May 10, 2025	TLFC	OKC 1889	2–1	Tulsa, OK
June 19, 2024	Friendly	Draw	0–0	Oklahoma City, OK
June 12, 2024	Friendly	Tulsa Athletic	1–2	Tulsa, OK
July 15, 2023	NPSL Playoffs	Tulsa Athletic	1–2	Claremore, OK
June 17, 2023	NPSL	Tulsa Athletic	1–2	Claremore, OK
May 24, 2023	NPSL	OKC 1889	1–0	Oklahoma City, OK
July 16, 2022	NPSL Playoffs	Tulsa Athletic	1-5	Tulsa, OK
July 6, 2022	NPSL	Tulsa Athletic	1–5	Tulsa, OK
May 25, 2022	NPSL	Tulsa Athletic	0–3	Oklahoma City, OK
July 14, 2021	NPSL Playoffs	Tulsa Athletic	2–2 (4–5 p)	Tulsa, OK
June 27, 2021	NPSL	Tulsa Athletic	0–2	Edmond, OK
May 16, 2021	NPSL	OKC 1889	3–1	Tulsa, OK

=== Purple Reign derby ===
Rivalry with Reign FK in Bartlesville, Oklahoma. Reign FK is defunct as of 2024.

Record
Won	Drawn	Lost	GF	GA
6	3	0	21	5

Results
Date	Competition	Winner	Score	Location
June 3, 2023	NPSL	Draw	0-0	Bartlesville, OK
May 13, 2023	NPSL	OKC 1889	2–0	Oklahoma City, OK
June 28, 2022	NPSL	OKC 1889	2–1	Bartlesville, OK
May 18, 2022	NPSL	OKC 1889	2–0	Norman, OK
June 5, 2021	NPSL	OKC 1889	6–0	Edmond, OK
May 1, 2021	NPSL	Draw	1–1	Bartlesville, OK
July 2, 2019	UPSL Playoffs	OKC 1889	3–1	Norman, OK
May 4, 2019	UPSL	Draw	2–2	Norman, OK
April 20, 2019	UPSL	OKC 1889	3–0	Bartlesville, OK

== Media coverage ==
The goal of the club according to is to "provide a serious, professionally run team by the community, for the community." The club has gained notoriety by being the covered by various media outlets such as The UPSL Podcast, the Scissortail Podcast, the Tornado Alley Soccer Podcast, and the Full 90+ Podcast. The first year of the Imps being in the NPSL, they gained notoriety from coverage from an expert in American Lower League Soccer, Protagonist Soccer.

== Year-by-year ==
=== Yearly results ===
Year	Division	League	Regular season	W-D-L	GF–GA	Playoffs	W-D-L	GF–GA
2018	5	UPSL	3rd, Central North	3-3-2	27-16	Did not qualify	N/A	N/A
2019	5	UPSL	2nd, Central North	7-3-2	33-14	Central Conference Champions	4-0-1	10-7
2020	5	UPSL	Did not play	N/A	N/A	Did not play	N/A	N/A
2021	4	NPSL	3rd, South Heartland	5-2-3	33-10	Heartland Semi-Final	0-0-1	2-2
2022	4	NPSL	2nd, South Heartland	8-2-2	20-14	Heartland Final	1-0-1	5-7
2023	4	NPSL	2nd, Midwest Heartland	7-1-2	17-8	Heartland Final	1-0-1	3-3
2024	4	NPSL	1st, South Heartland	4-1-1	12-8	South Region Semifinal	0-0-1	1-4
2025	4	TLFC	2nd, Central Mid-American	5-0-5	16-15	Mid-American Final (Match Cancelled)	0-0-0	0-0

=== All-Time table ===
Match Type	Played	Won	Drawn	Lost	Goals For	Goals Against	Goal Difference	Win %
Regular Season	68	39	12	17	158	85	+73	57.35
Playoffs	11	6	0	5	21	23	−2	54.55
Total	79	45	12	22	179	108	+71	56.96

- Updated as of July 1, 2025

== Managers ==
- Includes all competitive matches: regular season and playoffs

Manager	Nationality	Start	End	Games	Win	Draw	Loss	GF	GA	GD	Win %
Adam Kay	England	February 21, 2017	March 15, 2022	36	19	8	9	105	49	+56	52.78
Niall Burley	England	March 16, 2022	March 23, 2024	26	17	3	6	45	32	+13	65.38
Harvey Paul	England	March 23, 2024	February 11, 2025	7	4	1	2	13	12	+1	57.14
Neil Hilton, James Roberson	England	February 11, 2025	present	10	5	0	5	16	15	+1	50.00

== Honors ==
=== Club ===
- NPSL Heartland Conference
  - Champions (1): 2024
  - Regular Season Shield (1): 2024
- UPSL Spring Central Conference
  - Playoff Champions (1): 2019

=== Player honors ===
Year	Player	Country	Position	Honor
2019	Niall Burley	ENG	Forward	Spring UPSL Best XI - Second Team
2021	Callum Shepherd	ENG	Forward	NPSL Team of the Month - May
2021	Fabian Forisch	GER	Defender	NPSL Heartland Conference XI
2021	Muhammad Bilal	ENG	Midfielder	NPSL Heartland Conference XI
2021	Muhammad Bilal	ENG	Midfielder	NPSL South Region XI
2023	Isaias Silva	USA	Forward	NPSL Heartland Conference XI
2023	Jack O'Riordan	IRL	Midfielder	NPSL Heartland Conference XI
2023	Keshon Carter	TTO	Defender	NPSL Heartland Conference XI
2023	Niall Burley	ENG	Manager	NPSL Heartland Conference XI
2025	Kareem Williams	JAM	Defender	TLFC Mid-American Conference TOTS
2025	Shonosuke Suzuki	JPN	Midfielder	TLFC Mid-American Conference TOTS
2025	Pedro Belmont	BRA	Forward	TLFC Mid-American Conference TOTS

== Records ==
- First win: 6–1 v Keene FC, May 27, 2018
- Biggest win: 8–0 v Keene FC, July 7, 2018; 9–1 v Dallas City FC, June 12, 2021
- Biggest defeat: 5–1 v Irving FC, April 27, 2019; 5–1 v Tulsa Athletic, July 6, 2022; 5–1 v Tulsa Athletic, July 16, 2022
- First goal: Petar Durdevic v Inocentes FC, May 19, 2018
- 100th goal: Jackson Kim v Dallas City FC, June 12, 2021

== Finals ==
Record
Won	Lost	GF	GA
1	2	4	8

Finals
Date	Competition	Opponent	Result	Score	Location
July 12, 2025	TLFC Mid-American Conference Final	Tulsa Athletic	Match Cancelled	0-0	Tulsa, OK
July 15, 2023	NPSL Heartland Conference Final	Tulsa Athletic	Lost	1-2	Claremore, OK
July 16, 2022	NPSL Heartland Conference Final	Tulsa Athletic	Lost	1-5	Tulsa, OK
July 17, 2019	UPSL Central Conference Final	Inocentes FC	Won	2-1	Fort Worth, TX
