= 2008–09 Burnley F.C. season =

English football club season

Burnley
2008–09 season
- Chairman: Barry Kilby
- Manager: Owen Coyle
- Championship: 5th (promoted via play-offs)
- FA Cup: Fifth round
- League Cup: Semi-finals
- Top goalscorer: League: Martin Paterson (13); All: Martin Paterson (19)
- Highest home attendance: 19,533 v Tottenham (21 January 2009)
- Lowest home attendance: 3,760 v QPR (13 January 2009)
- Average home league attendance: 13,082

The 2008–09 season was Burnley's 9th season in the second tier of English football. They were managed by Owen Coyle – his second season since he replaced Steve Cotterill on 8 November 2007. Burnley finished fifth in the league but were promoted to the Premier League after winning the Football League Championship playoffs. It was the first time the club was in the top division of English Football for 33 years.

== First-team squad ==
Updated 30 June 2008.

=== Current squad ===
Note: Flags indicate national team as defined under FIFA eligibility rules; some limited exceptions apply. Players may hold more than one non-FIFA nationality.

No.	Pos.	Nation	Player
1	GK	PER	Diego Penny
2	DF	SCO	Graham Alexander (vice-captain)
3	DF	NOR	Christian Kalvenes
4	DF	NIR	Michael Duff
5	DF	ENG	Clarke Carlisle
6	DF	SCO	Steven Caldwell (captain)
7	MF	SCO	Kevin McDonald
8	MF	ISL	Joey Guðjónsson
9	FW	NGR	Ade Akinbiyi
10	FW	NIR	Martin Paterson
11	MF	ENG	Wade Elliott
12	GK	DEN	Brian Jensen
16	MF	IRL	Chris McCann

No.	Pos.	Nation	Player
17	GK	HUN	Gábor Király
18	MF	IRL	Alan Mahon
19	FW	ENG	Jay Rodriguez
20	FW	ENG	Robbie Blake
21	DF	AUS	Rhys Williams (on loan from Middlesbrough)
22	FW	ALB	Besart Berisha
23	DF	ENG	Stephen Jordan
24	DF	SCO	Russell Anderson (on loan from Sunderland)
25	MF	ENG	Adam Kay
26	MF	NED	Remco van der Schaaf
27	MF	SCO	Alex MacDonald
30	FW	SCO	Steve Thompson
33	MF	ENG	Chris Eagles

=== Transfers ===
==== In ====
Date	#	Pos	Player	From	Fee
23 June 2008	10	FW	(Northern Ireland) Martin Paterson	Scunthorpe United	£1.3m
24 June 2008	7	MF	(Scotland) Kevin McDonald	(Scotland) Dundee	£500k
26 June 2008	3	DF	(Norway) Christian Kalvenes	(Scotland) Dundee United	Free
27 June 2008	1	GK	(Peru) Diego Penny	(Peru) Coronel Bolognesi	Undisclosed
7 July 2008	26	MF	(Netherlands) Remco van der Schaaf	(Netherlands) Vitesse Arnhem	Free
29 July 2008	33	FW	(England) Chris Eagles	Manchester United	Undisclosed
26 August 2008	24	DF	(Scotland) Russell Anderson	Sunderland	Loan
30 January 2009	21	DF	(Australia) Rhys Williams	Middlesbrough	Loan

==== Out ====
Date	#	Pos	Player	To	Fee
19 June 2008	17	FW	(Northern Ireland) Kyle Lafferty	(Scotland) Rangers	£3.8m
8 August 2008	22	FW	(Albania) Besart Berisha	(Norway) Rosenborg	Loan
17 October 2008	N/A	MF	(Northern Ireland) Steve Jones	Huddersfield Town	Loan
27 November 2008	N/A	MF	(Northern Ireland) Steve Jones	Bradford City	Loan
8 January 2009	22	FW	(Albania) Besart Berisha	(Denmark) AC Horsens	Loan
30 January 2009	17	GK	(Hungary) Gábor Király	(Germany) Bayer Leverkusen	Loan
2 February 2009	26	MF	(Netherlands) Remco van der Schaaf	(Denmark) Brøndby	Loan
17 March 2009	18	MF	(Republic of Ireland) Alan Mahon	Blackpool	Loan
20 March 2009	25	MF	(England) Adam Kay	Accrington Stanley	Loan
6 April 2009	9	FW	(Nigeria) Ade Akinbiyi	(United States) Houston Dynamo	Free

== Match details ==
=== Football League Championship ===
==== League table ====
Pos	Team	Pld	W	D	L	GF	GA	GD	Pts	Promotion, qualification or relegation
3	Sheffield United	46	22	14	10	64	39	+25	80	Qualification for Championship play-offs
4	Reading	46	21	14	11	72	40	+32	77	Qualification for Championship play-offs
5	Burnley (O, P)	46	21	13	12	72	60	+12	76	Qualification for Championship play-offs
6	Preston North End	46	21	11	14	66	54	+12	74	Qualification for Championship play-offs
7	Cardiff City	46	19	17	10	65	53	+12	74	

Updated to match(es) played on 3 May 2009. Source: The Football League
Rules for classification: 1) points; 2) goal difference; 3) number of goals scored.
(O) Play-off winners; (P) Promoted

==== Matches ====
Football League Championship match details
Date	League position	Opponents	Venue	Result	Score F–A	Scorers	Attendance	Ref
9 August 2008	24th	Sheffield Wednesday	A	L	1–4	Paterson 6'	23,793	
16 August 2008	24th	Ipswich Town	H	L	0–3		11,312	
23 August 2008	23rd	Crystal Palace	A	D	0–0		14,071	
30 August 2008	23rd	Plymouth Argyle	H	D	0–0		10,032	
13 September 2008	19th	Nottingham Forest	A	W	2–1	Alexander (2) 25', 70' pen.	20,504	
16 September 2008	12th	Blackpool	H	W	2–0	Paterson 60', Alexander 76' pen.	13,752	
20 September 2008	13th	Swansea City	A	D	1–1	Guðjónsson 59'	13,299	
27 September 2008	8th	Preston North End	H	W	3–1	Guðjónsson 33', Caldwell 64', Eagles 90'	16,276	
30 September 2008	4th	Watford	H	W	3–2	Alexander 25' pen., Paterson 64', Elliott 69'	10,033	
4 October 2008	9th	Reading	A	L	1–3	McCann 89'	18,621	
18 October 2008	11th	Birmingham City	H	D	1–1	McCann 25'	13,809 (934 away)	
21 October 2008	6th	Coventry City	A	W	3–1	Duff 52', Blake 88', Eagles 90'	14,621	
25 October 2008	8th	Charlton Athletic	A	D	1–1	Thompson 13'	21,884	
28 October 2008	5th	Reading	H	W	1–0	Blake 81'	11,538	
1 November 2008	4th	Norwich City	H	W	2–0	Eagles (2) 55', 60'	11,353	
8 November 2008	5th	Wolverhampton Wanderers	A	L	0–2		23,711 (1,088 away)	
15 November 2008	4th	Queens Park Rangers	A	W	2–1	Blake 34', Mahon 60'	13,226	
22 November 2008	5th	Doncaster Rovers	H	D	0–0		12,173	
24 November 2008	5th	Barnsley	A	L	2–3	Paterson (2) 69', 73'	10,678	
29 November 2008	4th	Derby County	H	W	3–0	McDonald 6', Paterson (2) 15', 23'	11,552	
6 December 2008	4th	Sheffield United	A	W	3–2	Paterson 19', Alexander 42' pen., Eagles 79'	24,702	
9 December 2008	4th	Cardiff City	H	D	2–2	Blake 14', Thompson 76'	11,230	
13 December 2008	4th	Southampton	H	W	3–2	Perry 4' o.g., Guðjónsson (2) 7', 11'	11,229	
20 December 2008	4th	Bristol City	A	W	2–1	Paterson 57', Thompson 77'	16,108	
26 December 2008	4th	Barnsley	H	L	1–2	McCann 38'	16,580	
28 December 2008	5th	Doncaster Rovers	A	L	1–2	Paterson 62'	14,020	
10 January 2009	7th	Swansea City	H	L	0–2		13,740	
17 January 2009	7th	Preston North End	A	L	1–2	Blake 77'	15,692	
27 January 2009	9th	Watford	A	L	0–3		13,193	
31 January 2009	8th	Charlton Athletic	H	W	2–1	Thompson (2) 76' 90'	14,404	
7 February 2009	10th	Birmingham City	A	D	1–1	Paterson 3'	16,763 (986 away)	
14 February 2009	8th	Wolverhampton Wanderers	H	W	1–0	McCann 6'	13,515 (1,496 away)	
17 February 2009	7th	Coventry City	H	D	1–1	Eagles 90'	14,595	
21 February 2009	7th	Norwich City	A	D	1–1	Thompson 36'	24,363	
28 February 2009	9th	Sheffield Wednesday	H	L	2–4	McCann 53', Eagles 85'	12,449	
3 March 2009	7th	Blackpool	A	W	1–0	Kalvenes 85'	7,679	
11 March 2009	6th	Crystal Palace	H	W	4–2	Carlisle 39', Alexander 83' pen., Thompson 88', Rodriguez 90'	10,312	
14 March 2009	5th	Nottingham Forest	H	W	5–0	Blake 19', Elliott 39', Carlisle 51', Rodriguez 55', Guðjónsson 73'	13,055	
17 March 2009	5th	Ipswich Town	A	D	1–1	Elliott 19'	18,745	
21 March 2009	4th	Plymouth Argyle	A	W	2–1	Caldwell 16', Blake 78'	11,246	
4 April 2009	5th	Derby County	A	D	1–1	McCann 59'	33,010	
11 April 2009	6th	Queens Park Rangers	H	W	1–0	Carlisle 49'	15,058	
13 April 2009	6th	Cardiff City	A	L	1–3	Blake 84'	19,379	
20 April 2009	5th	Sheffield United	H	W	1–0	Paterson 23'	14,884	
25 April 2009	6th	Southampton	A	D	2–2	Alexander 32' pen., Carlisle 67'	23,927	
3 May 2009	5th	Bristol City	H	W	4–0	Alexander (2) 42' pen., 76' pen., Elliott 44', Guðjónsson 86'	18,005	

=== Football League Championship play-offs ===
Football League Championship play-off match details
Round	Date	Opponents	Venue	Result	Score F–A	Scorers	Attendance	Ref
Semi-final first leg	9 May 2009	Reading	H	W	1–0	Alexander 84' pen.	18,853	
Semi-final second leg	12 May 2009	Reading	A	W	2–0	Paterson 50', Thompson 58'	19,909	
Final	25 May 2009	Sheffield United	N	W	1–0	Elliott 13'	80,518 (37,000 Burnley fans)	

=== FA Cup ===
FA Cup match details
Round	Date	Opponents	Venue	Result	Score F–A	Scorers	Attendance	Ref
Third round	3 January 2009	Queens Park Rangers	A	D	0–0		8,896 (775 away)	
Third round replay	13 January 2009	Queens Park Rangers	H	W	2–1 (a.e.t.)	Thompson 60', Rodriguez 120'	3,760 (285 away)	
Fourth round	24 January 2009	West Bromwich Albion	A	D	2–2	Alexander 25' pen., Paterson 89'	18,294 (1,354 away)	
Fourth round replay	3 February 2009	West Bromwich Albion	H	W	3–1	Elliott 44', Thompson (2) 52', 88'	6,635 (652 away)	
Fifth round	8 March 2009	Arsenal	A	L	0–3		57,454 (5,188 away)	

=== Football League Cup ===
Football League Cup match details
Round	Date	Opponents	Venue	Result	Score F–A	Scorers	Attendance	Ref
First round	12 August 2008	Bury	A	W	2–0	Paterson (2) 40', 90'	4,276 (2,069 away)	
Second round	26 August 2008	Oldham Athletic	H	W	3–0	McCann 12', Paterson (2) 63', 79'	5,528 (1,552 away)	
Third round	23 September 2008	Fulham	H	W	1–0	Rodriguez 88'	7,119 (206 away)	
Fourth round	12 November 2008	Chelsea	A	D	1–1 (a.e.t.) (5–4 p)	Akinbiyi 69'	41,369 (6,100 away)	
Quarter final	2 December 2008	Arsenal	H	W	2–0	McDonald (2) 6', 57'	19,045 (2,141 away)	
Semi final first leg	6 January 2009	Tottenham Hotspur	A	L	1–4	Paterson 15'	31,377 (4,212 away)	
Semi final second leg	21 January 2009	Tottenham Hotspur	H	W	3–2 (a.e.t.)	Blake 34', McCann 73', Rodriguez 88'	19,533 (2,793 away)	

== Appearances and goals ==
Numbers in parentheses denote appearances as substitute.
Players with names struck through and marked † left the club during the playing season.
Players with names in italics and marked * were on loan from another club with Burnley.
Key to positions: GK – Goalkeeper; DF – Defender; MF – Midfielder; FW – Forward

No.	Pos.	Nat.	Name	League		FA Cup		League Cup		Play-offs		Total		Discipline	
No.	Pos.	Nat.	Name	Apps	Goals	Apps	Goals	Apps	Goals	Apps	Goals	Apps	Goals	A yellow rectangle, denoting the yellow penalty card shown to a player being cautioned	A red rectangle, denoting the red penalty card shown to a player being sent off
1	GK	PER	Diego Penny	1	0	0	0	0	0	0	0	1	0	0	0
2	MF	SCO	Graham Alexander	46	9	5	1	7	0	3	1	61	11	0	0
3	DF	NOR	Christian Kalvenes	21	1	4	0	2 (1)	0	3	0	30 (1)	1	0	0
4	DF	NIR	Michael Duff	22 (5)	1	3	0	5 (2)	0	3	0	33 (7)	0	0	0
5	DF	ENG	Clarke Carlisle	36	4	4	0	5	0	3	0	48	4	0	0
6	DF	SCO	Steven Caldwell	45	2	4	0	5	0	3	0	57	2	0	0
7	MF	SCO	Kevin McDonald	9 (16)	1	2	0	2 (3)	2	0 (1)	0	13 (20)	3	0	0
8	MF	ISL	Joey Guðjónsson	20 (19)	6	3 (2)	0	5 (2)	0	1 (2)	0	29 (25)	6	0	0
9	FW	NGA	~~Ade Akinbiyi~~ †	1 (10)	0	0	0	0 (4)	1	0	0	1 (14)	1	0	0
10	FW	NIR	Martin Paterson	39 (4)	12	4	1	7	5	3	1	53 (4)	19	0	0
11	MF	ENG	Wade Elliott	41 (1)	4	4 (1)	1	6 (1)	0	2	1	53 (3)	6	0	0
12	GK	DEN	Brian Jensen	45	0	5	0	7	0	3	0	60	0	0	0
14	FW	NIR	Steve Jones	0	0	0	0	0	0	0	0	0	0	0	0
16	MF	IRL	Chris McCann	44	6	4	0	7	2	3	0	58	8	0	0
17	GK	HUN	Gábor Király	0	0	0	0	0	0	0	0	0	0	0	0
18	MF	IRL	Alan Mahon	0 (7)	1	0 (2)	0	0 (3)	0	0	0	0 (12)	1	0	0
19	FW	ENG	Jay Rodriguez	2 (23)	2	0 (4)	1	0 (3)	2	0 (3)	0	2 (33)	5	0	0
20	MF	ENG	Robbie Blake	33 (13)	8	5	0	6 (1)	1	3	0	47 (14)	9	0	0
21	DF	AUS	~~Rhys Williams~~ * †	17	0	0	0	0	0	0	0	17	0	0	0
22	FW	ALB	Besart Berisha	0	0	0	0	0	0	0	0	0	0	0	0
23	DF	ENG	Stephen Jordan	26 (1)	0	1	0	6	0	0	0	34 (1)	0	0	0
24	DF	SCO	~~Russell Anderson~~ * †	4	0	0	0	1	0	0	0	5	0	0	0
25	MF	ENG	Adam Kay	0	0	0	0	0	0	0	0	0	0	0	0
26	MF	NED	Remco van der Schaaf	1	0	0	0	0	0	0	0	1	0	0	0
27	MF	SCO	Alex MacDonald	0 (3)	0	0 (3)	0	0	0	0	0	0 (6)	0	0	0
30	FW	SCO	Steven Thompson	23 (11)	7	3 (2)	3	0	0	2 (1)	1	31 (14)	11	0	0
33	MF	ENG	Chris Eagles	30 (13)	7	4	0	6 (1)	0	1 (2)	0	41 (16)	7	0	0

== Player of the Year Awards 2009 ==
#	Pos	Winner	Award
N/A	FW	(England) Wes Fletcher	Youth Player of the Year
1	GK	(Denmark) Brian Jensen	League Cup Player of the Tournament
19	FW	(England) Jay Rodriguez v Nottingham Forest, 14 March 2009	Goal of the Season
16	MF	(Republic of Ireland) Chris McCann	Young Player of the Year
2	DF	(Scotland) Graham Alexander	Players' Player of the Year
20	FW	(England) Robbie Blake	Player of the Year
