= New Jersey Teamsterz FC =

American professional soccer club

- Full name: New Jersey Teamsterz Football Club
- Nickname: Teamsterz FC
- Founded: 2017; 9 years ago
- Stadium: Don Ahern Veterans Memorial Stadium; Bayonne, New Jersey
- Capacity: 7,000
- Owner(s): Sibrena Geraldino; Alex Geraldino
- President: Alex Geraldino
- Head coach: Javier Romero
- League: NISA Nation
- 2019: UPSL, 2nd, Northeast Conf.
- Website: njteamsterzfc.com
Home colors

New Jersey Teamsterz FC (known as New Jersey Teamsters FC until 2021) is an American professional soccer club based in Bayonne, New Jersey that formerly played in the plays in the United Premier Soccer League and NISA Nation. The club was announced as an expansion team for the 2022 National Independent Soccer Association season, though the team ultimately never played in the league.

== History ==
The Teamsterz were announced as a new member of the United Premier Soccer League (UPSL) on February 28, 2017.

The team began play in the Northeast Conference's American Division during the 2018 Spring UPSL season. In its first home match on April 14, 2018, at Don Ahern Veterans Memorial Stadium, the Teamsterz overcame two one goal deficits and finished with a 2–2 draw to earn its first ever competitive point. The group went on to finish third in its division, clinching a postseason spot before falling in the semifinals of the American Division playoffs to Junior Lone Star FC II. The following Spring, New Jersey finished second within the conference, now playing within a single table, but failed to make the national playoffs.

On February 26, 2020, the Teamsterz announced it had been accepted into the National Independent Soccer Association (NISA), a professionally sanctioned division 3 league, with plans to begin professional play in Spring 2021, though this was later pushed back to Fall due to then on-going COVID-19 pandemic. The organization further stated that it would not be fielding a UPSL team in 2020.

In 2020, team owners Sibrena and Alex Geraldino were featured on Discovery Channel's series "I Quit," which followed entrepreneurs who quit their jobs in order to launch new businesses. The team announced that they were changing the spelling of the team name from Teamsters to Teamsterz.

On 23rd August 2021, the Teamsterz announce that they would join NISA newly born amateur league, the NISA Nation as founding member for the 2021 Fall season.

=== Year-by-year ===
Year	Tier	League	Regular season (W–L–T)	Playoffs	U.S. Open Cup
2018 Spring	5	UPSL	3rd of 8, Northeast Conference, American Division (9–1–4)	Divisional Semifinal	Not eligible
2019 Spring	5	UPSL	2nd of 8, Northeast Conference (6–1–1)	did not qualify	did not enter
2020	No team fielded				
2021 Fall	4	NISA Nation	4th of 6, Northeast Conference		

== Honors ==
- Atlantic Cup Champions: 2019

== NJ Teamsterz FC Reserves ==
The Teamsterz field a reserve team in the fully amateur Garden State Soccer League (GSSL), which is sanctioned by the United States Adult Soccer Association within USASA Region I. The reserves play their home fixtures at Stephen R. Gregg Park in Bayonne, NJ, located a mile and a half north of Veterans Stadium.

Year	League	Regular season (W–L–T)	Playoffs	State Open Cup	U.S. Open Cup
2018–19	GSSL	1st of 8, North B Division (10–3–0)	Division champions	Not eligible	Not eligible
2019–20 (Note: Season cancelled due to the coronavirus pandemic)	GSSL	3rd of 6, North A Division, Group Y (4–0–1)	Cancelled	Qualifying Round	did not enter
