= Adam Kay (footballer) =

English footballer

Personal information
- Full name: Adam David Rhodes Kay
- Date of birth: 1 March 1992 (age 34)
- Place of birth: Bath, England
- Position: Defender

Team information
- Current team: Des Moines Menace (assistant coach)

Youth career
- –2008: Bristol Rovers

College career
Years	Team	Apps	(Gls)
2011–2014	Southwestern Christian Eagles	92	(30)

Senior career*
Years	Team	Apps	(Gls)
2004–2008	Bristol Rovers	1	(0)
2007	→ Accrington Stanley (loan)	3	(0)
2008–2009	→ Chester City (loan)	5	(x)
2009	Stalybridge Celtic	31	(7)
2012–2013	Oklahoma City FC	13	(4)
2014	Vermont Voltage	14	(0)

Managerial career
- 2016-2019: Mid-American Christian (Assistant)
- 2017–2022: Oklahoma City 1889 FC
- 2019-2021: Southwestern Christian
- 2022-: Des Moines Menace (Assistant)
- 2021-2023: Davis and Elkins (Associate Head Coach)
- 2023-: LSU Shreveport
- * Club domestic league appearances and goals

Adam David Rhodes Kay (born 1 March 1992) is an English former footballer and head coach for the LSU–Shreveport Pilots men's soccer team and assistant coach for USL League Two side Des Moines Menace.

== Early life ==
Kay was born in Bath, Somerset, attending Wellsway School.

== Career ==
=== Bristol Rovers ===
He was promoted to the senior squad during the 2007–08 season after progressing through the youth ranks at the club and was handed the squad number 25 and named as a substitute on 29 December 2007 for the home game against Bristol City.

He moved to League 2 side Accrington Stanley on 20 March 2009 until the end of the season. On 21 August 2009, Kay joined Chester on loan until January 2010 along with Chris Lynch. During his loan spell with Chester, he played 15 league matches and scored no goals.

=== Stalybridge Celtic ===
On 17 September 2010, Kay signed a contract with Conference North side Stalybridge Celtic and made his debut for the club the following day in the 1–3 defeat away at Solihull Moors.

He joined Radcliffe Borough on loan in December 2011.

=== USA ===
In 2011, Kay went America to study at Southwestern Christian University, studying at the college for four years. Kay, also spent time with USL PDL and NPSL teams, which saw him play for Vermont Voltage (2014), Oklahoma City FC (2012, 2013), setting a record number of appearances in the USL PDL for Vermont Voltage in a single season.

== Managerial career ==
In 2017, Kay was appointed as head coach of National Premier Soccer League side Oklahoma City 1889. In 2019, Kay became the head coach of NAIA team Southwestern Christian University after serving from 2016 to 2019 as an assistant at Mid-American Christian University. On 15 March 2022, Kay announced that he was stepping down from OKC 1889. On 19 April 2022, SCU announced that Kay would be stepping down as head coach. He would spend the 2022 USL League Two season with Des Moines Menace. In May 2022, Kay was given the Associate Head Coach job at Davis and Elkins College. Louisiana State University Shreveport announced that Kay would be the new head coach of their men's soccer team on 13 April 2023.

- Updated as of 13 April 2023

Managerial record by team and tenure
Team	From	To	Record				
Team	From	To	P	W	D	L	Win %
OKC 1889	21 February 2017	15 March 2022	37	24	8	5	64.86
SCU Eagles	10 December 2019	19 April 2022	41	36	4	1	87.80
LSUS Pilots	13 April 2023		26	22	3	1	84.62

== Honours ==
OKC 1889 FC

- UPSL Central Conference Spring Playoff Championship: 2019

Southwestern Christian University

- Sooner Athletic Conference Regular Season Championship: 2020
- NCCAA Central Region Championship: 2021

Individual

- Sooner Athletic Conference Coach of the Year: 2020
