= MatSu United FC =

- Full name: MatSu United Football Club
- Nicknames: The Black and Blues
- Founded: 2011; 14 years ago
- Ground: Meadow Lakes Park; Wasilla, Alaska
- Capacity: 1,000
- Coordinates: 61.1592359°N 149.1377°W
- General Manager: Rich Snyder
- Head Coach: Allen Alberton
- League: UPSL
- 2019: 3rd
- Website: https://matsuunitedfc.com/

MatSu United FC is a semi-professional soccer club based in Palmer, Alaska. The club began playing in the Last Frontier Division of the United Premier Soccer League in 2019.

== History ==
The club was founded as Alaska City FC in 2011. On June 5, 2018 it was announced the team would join the semi-professional UPSL, becoming the first Alaskan soccer club to play at the fifth-tier of soccer or above. The team made its league debut on June 7, 2019 in a scoreless draw against Arctic Rush.

Following the club's debut UPSL season, Alaska City FC rebranded as MatSu United FC on May 23, 2020. The new name is a reference to the Matanuska-Susitna Valley, where the club calls home.

== Stadium ==
For the 2019 season, it was announced that the club would play its home matches at Machetanz Field in Palmer, Alaska.

== Current roster ==
Note: Flags indicate national team as defined under FIFA eligibility rules; some limited exceptions apply. Players may hold more than one non-FIFA nationality. Squad correct as of March 12, 2019.

No.	Pos.	Nation	Player
—	GK	USA	Corey Hogan
—	DF	USA	Asher Dale
—	MF	USA	Adam Mruk
—	FW	TUR	Ibrahim Ilhan
—	DF	USA	Leo Jaschek
—	DF	USA	Joshua Banks
—	DF	USA	Nathan Alton
—	DF	KOR	Younghun Kim
—	MF	USA	Austin Richardson
—	MF	THA	Bon Chapootorn
—	MF	USA	Zach McCann
—	MF	USA	Colin O'Hare
—	MF	USA	Elijah Crawford
—	DF	USA	Eljah Hall
—	FW	USA	Noah Krozel
—	FW	USA	Phongsay Luongsaysana
—	MF	USA	Isaiah Montoya
—	FW	USA	Kevin Hartman

== Club management ==
Position	Staff
Board of directors	Barrett Banks; Donald Richardson; John Haley; Allan Alberton
Head coach	Allan Alberton
Player representative	Joshua Banks

Last updated: June 13, 2018
Source: UPSL

== Record ==
Year	Division	League	Record (W–L–D)	Regular Season	Other
2019	5	UPSL	0–3–1	3rd, Last Frontier Division	

=== 2019 Spring season ===
7 June 2019	Alaska City FC	0–0	Arctic Rush	Palmer, Alaska
		Report		Stadium: Machetanz Field

14 June 2019	Alaska City FC	0–3	Cook Inlet SC	Palmer, Alaska
		Report		Stadium: Machetanz Field

12 July 2019	Cook Inlet SC	6–1	Alaska City FC	Anchorage, Alaska
		Report		Stadium: Bartlett High School Stadium

17 July 2019	Arctic Rush	2–1	Alaska City FC	Anchorage, Alaska
19:00		Report		Stadium: Service High School Stadium
