= Philadelphia Lone Star FC =

Philadelphia Lone Star
- Full name: Philadelphia Lone Star Football Club
- Nickname: The Stars
- Short name: PLSFC
- Founded: 2001; 25 years ago, as Junior Lone Star F.C.
- Stadium: South Philadelphia Athletic Super Site; Philadelphia, Pennsylvania
- Capacity: 3,500
- President: Paul A. Konneh, III
- Manager: Fatoma Turay
- League: USL League Two
- Website: plsfc.com
Home colors	Away colors

Philadelphia Lone Star Football Club is an American professional development soccer club based in Southwest Philadelphia, Pennsylvania that competes in USL League Two, the fourth tier of the American soccer pyramid. Nicknamed "the Stars", the club was founded as Junior Lone Star Football Club in 2001, but changed its name to Philadelphia Lone Star F.C. in 2018.

== History ==
Philadelphia Lone Star F.C. was established in 2001 under the name of Junior Lone Star Football Club by a group of Liberian American immigrant soccer players. The club was named Junior Lone Star FC, after the Liberian national football team, because most of the team's players were from Liberia at that time.

In 2001, the club had a single team with 11 players but the club has grown over the years with the addition of three teams with over 70 players. In 2012, the First Team will be participating in the National Premier Soccer League; the Reserve Team (U-23) will be participating in the US Club Soccer National Adult League; and the Junior Team (U-19/20) will be participating in the USL Super-20 League.

Junior Lone Star FC won its first major championship in 2008 when the club's U-23 team won the Eastern Pennsylvania State U23 Cup. The club's U23s then represented Eastern Pennsylvania in the 2008 USASA Region I Men's U-23 Cup where they defeated West Chester United SC and FC Delco in the semi-finals and final, respectively. The club's U23s subsequently represented USASA Region I at the 2008 USASA National Men's U-23 Championship where they lost to eventual champions Ela Elite in the semi-finals.

Junior Lone Star FC is affiliated with the United States Youth Soccer Association (USYSA), the United States Adult Soccer Association (USASA) and the US Club Soccer (USCS).

== Colors and badge ==
Philadelphia Lone Star's home colors are white along with a red and navy stripes on the side. Traditional away colors have been either navy or red; however, in recent years several different colors have been used. Philadelphia Lone Star colors are similar to that of the Liberia national football team.

The Stars have previously worn two badges on their shirts, prior to their current badge which was implemented on 5 September 2018 after their name change to Philadelphia Lone Star. The red/white stripes, blue field and white star is a direct reference to the flag of Liberia, while 2001 is in reference to the year the club was founded.

The first, introduced at the club founding in 2001, consisted of a circular badge was based on designs which had been used on official club documentation since the mid-1960s. It consisted of a circular badge which used the same shield as the current badge, inside a circle bearing the name of the club. In late 2011, this was replaced by a circular crest divided into half by the club's name: Junior Lone Star FC. The upper portion of the crest had red and white stripes while the lower portion had a shining white star and the year 2001 within a blue field.

On 5 September 2018, the club rebranded to Philadelphia Lone Star and after members consultation, a new design of the badge was voted for. The shape of the crest is a pointed shield, a symbol of strength and togetherness which has been a staple of the Lone Star ethos and message since its formation. The 13 vertical stripes of red alternating with white symbolize the 13 original players who formed the first squad of the club in 2001.

The Liberty Bell is synonymous with the City of Philadelphia, a city that openly welcomed the club members from West Africa. The name of the Bell also resonates with Liberia National Motto: "The Love of LIBERTY Brought Us Here." There are also two different shades of blue around and within the crest. The left color is taken from the flag of Philadelphia and the right color is taken from the flag of Liberia.

=== Kit suppliers and shirt sponsors ===
Period	Kit supplier	Shirt sponsor
2001–2011	various	None
2012	Sarson	None
2013–2016	adidas	None
2017	Errea	Piayon Lasannah
2018–present	Icarus FC	Cypher

== Year-by-year ==
=== NPSL ===
Year	Regular season	Playoffs	U.S. Open Cup	Notes
2012	5th, Keystone Conference	did not qualify	Ineligible	
2013	4th, Keystone Conference	did not qualify	did not qualify	
2014	3rd, Keystone Conference	did not qualify	did not qualify	
2015	On Hiatus			
2016	3rd, Keystone Conference	Ineligible	did not qualify	
2017	6th, Keystone Conference	did not qualify	did not qualify	
2018	2nd, Keystone Conference	Conference Semifinal	did not qualify	Lost to West Chester United SC in Conference Semifinal
2019	4th, Keystone Conference	Conference Final	First Round	Lost to FC Motown in Conference Final
2020	Season cancelled due to COVID-19 pandemic			

=== USL League Two ===
Year	Regular season	Playoffs	U.S. Open Cup	Notes
2020	Season cancelled due to COVID-19 pandemic			
2021	4th, Mid Atlantic	did not qualify	did not qualify	
2022	5th, Mid Atlantic	did not qualify	did not qualify	
2023	5th, Mid Atlantic	did not qualify	did not qualify	
2024	5th, Mid Atlantic	did not qualify	did not qualify	
2025	Did not field national team			
2026	8th, Mid Atlantic	did not qualify	did not qualify	

=== UPSL ===
As Philadelphia Lone Star II

Year	Regular season	Playoffs	U.S. Open Cup	Notes
Spring 2018	2nd, American Division	Division Final	Ineligible	Lost to Rochester Super 9 Pro SC in Division Final
Fall 2018	did not compete			
Spring 2019	3rd, Northeast Conference	did not qualify	did not enter	
Fall 2019	4th, Empire Division	Division Final	did not enter	Lost to Mass United FC in Division Final
Spring 2020	Season delayed due to COVID-19			

=== WPSL ===
Year	Regular season	Playoffs	Notes
2019	2nd, Colonial Division	Conference Final	Lost to Torch FC in Conference Final
2020	Season cancelled due to COVID-19		

== Honors ==
U.S. Open Cup
2017, First Round (Qualified as an amateur side through local qualifying)
2019, First Round (Qualified as a member of the NPSL through 2018 season results)
2020 (Qualified as a member of the NPSL through 2019 season results)

Eastern Pennsylvania Soccer Association
State Open Cup Champions: 2016, 2018
State Amateur Cup Champions: 2016, 2018

Northeast Elite Soccer League
Regular Season Champions: 2018

Philadelphia Sierra Soccer League
Champions: 2011

== Stadiums ==
- Stadium at Monsignor Bonner High School's Turf Stadium; Drexel Hill, Pennsylvania (2013)
- Stadium at Northeast High School's Charles Martin Memorial Stadium; Philadelphia, Pennsylvania (2012)
