= Bugeaters FC =

American soccer team

- Full name: Bugeaters FC
- Founded: December 12, 2017; 7 years ago
- Ground: Morrison Stadium
- Capacity: 6,000
- Owner: Jonathan Collura
- Chairman: Jonathan Collura
- Head Coach: Scott Robertson
- League: GPPL
- 2018: 9-5-3 (3-2-3, 3rd UPSL Midwest Conf. West Div.)
- Website: https://www.bugeatersfc.com/
Home colors	Away colors	Third colors

Bugeaters FC are a semi-pro soccer team based in Omaha, Nebraska, that currently competes in the Great Plains Premier League.

== History ==
Bugeaters FC was announced as a United Premier Soccer League expansion team on December 12, 2017. The club was founded by Nebraska native Jonathan Collura.

The club's name is homage to the old nickname of native born Nebraskans as "Bugeaters."

During their inaugural season, the Bugeaters played in Lincoln, Nebraska, at Lincoln High School's Beechner Athletic Complex. For the 2019 Season, the club reached an agreement to play their home matches at Creighton University's Morrison Stadium in Omaha, Nebraska. The 2019 season will be an entirely exhibition season and starting in 2020, Bugeaters FC will become members of the Great Plains Premier League, an expansion sister league/conference to the Gulf Coast Premier League.

In May 2019, they announced a partnership with the academy of English club Huddersfield Town.

=== Year-by-Year ===
Season	League	Conference	Regular season							Position		Conf. Playoffs	National Playoffs	U.S. Open Cup
Season	League	Conference	GP	W	L	D	GF	GA	Pts	Conf.	Overall	Conf. Playoffs	National Playoffs	U.S. Open Cup
2018	UPSL	Midwest	8	3	2	3	17	15	12	3rd (West Division)	N/A	DNQ		
2019	GCPL	N/A	Exhibition-only season									N/A		
