= 2018 Spring UPSL season =

United Premier Soccer League
- Season: 2018 Spring
- Champions: Milwaukee Bavarian SC

The 2018 Spring United Premier Soccer League season was the 10th season of the UPSL.

In some parts of the country, UPSL is organized into Pro Premier and Championships Divisions with promotion and relegation between the Pro Premier division and the Championship Division. The 2018 Spring UPSL season had 136 clubs participate in the Pro Premier divisions and 28 clubs participate in the Championship divisions.

The overall structure of the League by Conference and roughly from west to east is represented in the table below

Conference	Western		Mountain	Southwest	Colorado	Midwest			
Pro Premier Divisions	SoCal	Wild West	Mountain	Southwest	Colorado	West	Central	North	East
Championship Divisions	SoCal	n/a	n/a	n/a	Colorado	n/a			

Conference	Central		Southeast				Northeast	
Pro Premier Divisions	North	South	Atlanta	Mid-Atlantic	Florida Central	Florida South	American	Patriot
Championship Divisions	n/a		n/a				n/a	

== Central Conference ==
The Central Conference is new for this season. It was split geographically into two divisions.

=== North Division ===
The North Division covers the state of Oklahoma, as well as North Texas. The division will play an 8 game home-and-away double round robin.

The following 5 clubs joined the division for its inaugural season

- Dallas Elite FC
- Inocentes FC — joined from Fort Worth Premier League
- Keene FC — new team
- OKC 1889 FC — new team
- Texas Spurs — new team

==== North Division Standings ====
Pos	Team	Pld	W	D	L	GF	GA	GD	Pts	Qualification
1	Inocentes FC	8	4	4	0	16	6	+10	16	Qualification for the Central Conference Playoffs
2	Dallas Elite FC	8	4	3	1	19	8	+11	15	Qualification for the Central Conference Playoffs
3	OKC 1889 FC	8	3	3	2	27	16	+11	12	
4	Texas Spurs	8	1	4	3	14	22	−8	7	
5	Keene FC	8	0	2	6	5	29	−24	2	

Rules for classification: 1) Points; 2) Goal difference; 3) Goals scored; 4) Head-to-head points; 5) Head-to-head goal difference; 6) Head-to-head goals scored; 7) Head-to-head matches won; 8) Playoff

=== South Division ===
The South Division covers South Texas. It will play an 8 game home-and-away double round robin.

The following 5 clubs joined the division for its inaugural season

- Atletico Katy — new team
- FC Knights — joined from Texas Premier Soccer League
- ISL USA FC
- Round Rock SC — new team
- Samba FC San Antonio — joined from Texas Premier Soccer League and rebranded from Genova FC San Antonio

==== South Division Standings ====
Pos	Team	Pld	W	D	L	GF	GA	GD	Pts	Qualification
1	Atletico Katy	8	7	0	1	42	8	+34	21	Qualification for the Central Conference Playoffs
2	Round Rock SC	8	5	1	2	23	9	+14	16	Qualification for the Central Conference Playoffs
3	ISL USA FC	8	3	1	4	12	20	−8	10	
4	FC Knights	8	3	0	5	7	29	−22	9	
5	Samba FC San Antonio	8	1	0	7	6	24	−18	3	

Rules for classification: 1) Points; 2) Goal difference; 3) Goals scored; 4) Head-to-head points; 5) Head-to-head goal difference; 6) Head-to-head goals scored; 7) Head-to-head matches won; 8) Playoff

=== Central Conference Playoffs ===
The 1st place team in each division will host the 2nd place team in the other division. The two winners will meet in the championship, hosted by the team with the most points.

Semifinals
July 21–Polytechnic High School
N1 Inocentes FC (a.e.t.)	1
S2 Round Rock SC	0
July 21–San Jacinto College
S1 Atletico Katy	2 (2)
N2 Dallas Elite FC (p)	2 (4)

Final
July 28–Polytechnic High School
N1 Inocentes FC	3
N2 Dallas Elite FC	2

Inocentes FC advance to the National Playoffs.

== Colorado Conference ==
=== Pro Premier ===
The division will play an 8 game home-or-away single round robin.

The following 2 clubs left the division before the season -

- Club El Azul — folded
- FC United — folded

The following 3 clubs joined the division before the season -

- Denver Metro FC — promoted from Championship Division
- GAM United FC — promoted from Championship Division
- Northern Colorado FC — promoted from Championship Division

==== Pro Premier Standings ====
Pos	Team	Pld	W	D	L	GF	GA	GD	Pts	Qualification
1	FC Boulder	8	5	2	1	20	7	+13	17	Qualification for the Colorado Conference Pro Premier Playoffs
2	Colorado Rush	8	5	1	2	16	10	+6	16	Qualification for the Colorado Conference Pro Premier Playoffs
3	Colorado Springs FC	8	4	3	1	19	11	+8	15	Qualification for the Colorado Conference Pro Premier Playoffs
4	Northern Colorado FC	8	4	2	2	12	7	+5	14	Qualification for the Colorado Conference Pro Premier Playoffs
5	GAM United FC	8	4	1	3	17	13	+4	13	
6	Logroñes Denver SC	8	4	1	3	16	15	+1	13	
7	Indios Denver FC	8	3	0	5	13	22	−9	9	
8	FC Greeley	8	1	1	6	8	24	−16	4	
9	Denver Metro FC	8	0	1	7	3	15	−12	1	

Rules for classification: 1) Points; 2) Goal difference; 3) Goals scored; 4) Head-to-head points; 5) Head-to-head goal difference; 6) Head-to-head goals scored; 7) Head-to-head matches won; 8) Playoff

==== Pro Premier Playoffs ====
Semifinals
July 15–Centaurus High School
1 FC Boulder	3
4 Northern Colorado FC	1
July 15–Shea Stadium
2 Colorado Rush	4
3 Colorado Springs FC	3

Final
July 22–Centaurus High School
1 FC Boulder	3
2 Colorado Rush	1

FC Boulder advance to the National Playoffs.

=== Championship ===
The division will play a 10 game home-and-away double round robin.

The following 4 clubs left the division before the season

- Denver Metro FC — promoted to Pro Premier Division
- GAM United FC — promoted to Pro Premier Division
- Legions FC — folded
- Northern Colorado FC — promoted to Pro Premier Division

The following 5 clubs joined the division before the season

- Athletic Club of Sloan's Lake — joined from Colorado Premier League
- Bright Stars of Colorado SC — new team
- Longmont Diablos FC — joined from local amateur league
- Monaco Denver FC — joined from Colorado Premier League
- Real Medina PSL — joined from local amateur league

==== Championship Standings ====
Pos	Team	Pld	W	D	L	GF	GA	GD	Pts	Qualification
1	Real Medina PSL	10	9	0	1	35	10	+25	27	Promotion to the Pro Premier Division
2	Athletic Club of Sloan's Lake	10	7	0	3	27	10	+17	21	
3	Monaco FC	10	5	1	4	21	20	+1	16	
4	Bright Stars of Colorado SC	10	4	1	5	11	17	−6	13	
5	Longmont Diablos FC	10	3	2	5	16	16	0	11	
6	Indios Denver FC U23	10	0	0	10	1	38	−37	0	

Rules for classification: 1) Points; 2) Goal difference; 3) Goals scored; 4) Head-to-head points; 5) Head-to-head goal difference; 6) Head-to-head goals scored; 7) Head-to-head matches won; 8) Playoff

== Midwest Conference ==
The Midwest Conference is new for this season. It was founded through a merger with the Premier League of America. The conference was split geographically into four divisions.

=== Central Division ===
The Central Division covers the states of Illinois and Iowa. It will play a 10 game home-and-away double round robin.

The following 6 clubs joined the division for its inaugural season

- Aurora Borealis SC — joined from Premier League of America
- DeKalb County United — new team
- Elgin Pumas SC — joined from Premier League of America
- Joliet United SC — new team
- RWB Adria — joined from Premier League of America
- Union Dubuque FC — new team

==== Central Division Standings ====
Pos	Team	Pld	W	D	L	GF	GA	GD	Pts	Qualification
1	RWB Adria	10	7	1	2	27	20	+7	22	Qualification for the Midwest Conference Playoffs
2	Aurora Borealis FC	10	6	1	3	22	12	+10	19	
3	Elgin Pumas SC	10	5	2	3	16	12	+4	17	
4	Union Dubuque FC	10	4	0	6	25	23	+2	12	
5	DeKalb County United	10	4	0	6	15	22	−7	12	
6	Joliet United SC	10	2	0	8	9	25	−16	6	

Rules for classification: 1) Points; 2) Goal difference; 3) Goals scored; 4) Head-to-head points; 5) Head-to-head goal difference; 6) Head-to-head goals scored; 7) Head-to-head matches won; 8) Playoff

=== East Division ===
The East Division covers the states of Indiana, Michigan, and Ohio. It will play a 10 game home-and-away double round robin.

The following 6 clubs joined the division for its inaugural season

- AAFC Lumberjacks — joined from local amateur competition
- Carpathia FC — joined from Premier League of America
- Muskegon Risers SC — joined from Premier League of America
- Oakland County FC — joined from Premier League of America
- Toledo Villa FC — joined from Premier League of America
- USAi Old Bhoys — new team

==== East Division Standings ====
Pos	Team	Pld	W	D	L	GF	GA	GD	Pts	Qualification
1	Toledo Villa FC	10	6	3	1	20	9	+11	21	Qualification for the Midwest Conference Playoffs
2	Carpathia FC	10	6	2	2	23	13	+10	20	
3	AAFC Lumberjacks	10	4	4	2	23	15	+8	16	
4	Muskegon Risers SC	10	4	3	3	15	20	−5	15	
5	Oakland County FC	10	3	0	7	21	26	−5	9	
6	USAi Old Bhoys	10	0	2	8	10	29	−19	2	

Rules for classification: 1) Points; 2) Goal difference; 3) Goals scored; 4) Head-to-head points; 5) Head-to-head goal difference; 6) Head-to-head goals scored; 7) Head-to-head matches won; 8) Playoff

=== North Division ===
The North Division covers the states of Minnesota and Wisconsin.

The following 6 clubs joined the division for its inaugural season

- Croatian Eagles SC — joined from Premier League of America
- FC Minneapolis — joined from American Champions League
- Granite City FC — joined from American Champions League
- Green Bay United
- Madison 56ers — joined from Premier League of America
- Milwaukee Bavarian SC — joined from Premier League of America

==== North Division Standings ====
Pos	Team	Pld	W	D	L	GF	GA	GD	Pts	Qualification
1	Milwaukee Bavarian SC	10	10	0	0	43	3	+40	30	Qualification for the Midwest Conference Playoffs
2	Madison 56ers	10	6	1	3	28	16	+12	19	
3	Green Bay United	10	6	1	3	27	20	+7	19	
4	Croatian Eagles SC	10	4	1	5	18	13	+5	13	
5	Granite City FC	10	2	0	8	11	48	−37	6	
6	FC Minneapolis	10	0	1	9	11	38	−27	1	

Rules for classification: 1) Points; 2) Goal difference; 3) Goals scored; 4) Head-to-head points; 5) Head-to-head goal difference; 6) Head-to-head goals scored; 7) Head-to-head matches won; 8) Playoff

=== West Division ===
The West Division covers the states of Kansas, Missouri, and Nebraska.

The following 5 clubs joined the division for its inaugural season

- Barilleros FC — joined from local amateur league
- Nebraska Bugeaters FC — new team
- Quinto Elemento FC — joined from local amateur league
- Santa Fe Wanderers — joined from local amateur league
- St. Louis Maritsa — joined from local amateur league

==== West Division Standings ====
Pos	Team	Pld	W	D	L	GF	GA	GD	Pts	Qualification
1	Santa Fe Wanderers	8	4	1	3	21	14	+7	13	Qualification for the Midwest Conference Playoffs
2	St. Louis Maritsa FC	8	3	4	1	20	15	+5	13	
3	Quinto Elemento FC	8	3	3	2	27	21	+6	12	
4	Nebraska Bugeaters FC	8	3	3	2	17	15	+2	12	
5	Barilleros FC	8	1	1	6	18	38	−20	4	

Rules for classification: 1) Points; 2) Goal difference; 3) Goals scored; 4) Head-to-head points; 5) Head-to-head goal difference; 6) Head-to-head goals scored; 7) Head-to-head matches won; 8) Playoff

=== Midwest Conference Playoffs ===
The regular season champions of each division advanced directly to the conference playoffs. All games were hosted at the Bavarian Soccer Complex, home of Milwaukee Bavarian SC. The semi-finals were seeded based on each participant's points-per-game average.

Semifinals
July 28–Bavarian Soccer Complex
N Milwaukee Bavarian SC	2
W Santa Fe Wanderers	1
July 28–Bavarian Soccer Complex
C RWB Adria	1
E Toledo Villa FC	0

Final
July 29–Bavarian Soccer Complex
N Milwaukee Bavarian SC	2
C RWB Adria	0

Milwaukee Bavarian SC advance to the National Playoffs.

== Mountain Conference ==
The Mountain Conference is new for this season. It was formed from the Idaho and Utah clubs from the Desert Mountain Conference. The conference will play a 10 game home-and-away double round robin.

The following Utah club left the Desert Mountain Conference before the season

- San Juan FC — folded

The following 6 clubs joined the conference for its inaugural season

- Boise Cutthroats FC — transferred from Desert Mountain Conference
- Idaho Lobos FC
- Magic Valley FC — returned from 1 season hiatus
- Provo Premier — transferred from Desert Mountain Conference
- San Juan FC — transferred from Desert Mountain Conference
- Utah Saints FC — new team

=== Mountain Conference standings ===
Pos	Team	Pld	W	D	L	GF	GA	GD	Pts	Qualification
1	San Juan FC	10	7	2	1	28	9	+19	23	Qualification for the Mountain Conference Playoffs
2	Boise Cutthroats FC	10	5	3	2	20	10	+10	18	Qualification for the Mountain Conference Playoffs
3	Idaho Lobos FC	10	5	1	4	28	22	+6	16	Qualification for the Mountain Conference Playoffs
4	Provo Premier	10	4	1	5	30	34	−4	13	Qualification for the Mountain Conference Playoffs
5	Magic Valley FC	10	3	1	6	22	34	−12	10	
6	Utah Saints FC	10	1	2	7	21	40	−19	5	

Rules for classification: 1) Points; 2) Goal difference; 3) Goals scored; 4) Head-to-head points; 5) Head-to-head goal difference; 6) Head-to-head goals scored; 7) Head-to-head matches won; 8) Playoff

=== Mountain Conference Playoffs ===
Semifinals
July 8–Juan Diego Catholic HS
1 San Juan FC	10
4 Provo Premier	2
July 7–Boise State University
2 Boise Cutthroats FC	4
3 Idaho Lobos FC	1

Final
July 22–Juan Diego Catholic HS
1 San Juan FC	0
2 Boise Cutthroats FC	1

Boise Cutthroats FC advance to the National Playoffs.

== Northeast Conference ==
The Northeast Conference is new for this season. It was split geographically into two divisions.

=== American Division ===
The American Division covers the states of Maryland, New Jersey, New York, and Pennsylvania.

The following 8 clubs joined the division for its inaugural season

- Catrachos De INCAEF — new team
- First Touch Elite Soccer
- Junior Lone Star FC II — reserve team of National Premier Soccer League club
- New Jersey Teamsters FC — new team
- Rochester Super 9 Pro FC — new team
- Screaming Eagles FC
- SGFC Eagles — joined from American Soccer League
- Upper Darby FC — joined from CASA Soccer League

==== American Division Standings ====
Pos	Team	Pld	W	D	L	GF	GA	GD	Pts	Qualification
1	Rochester Super 9 Pro SC	14	12	1	1	34	11	+23	37	Qualification for the American Division Playoffs
2	Junior Lone Star FC II	14	11	0	3	39	19	+20	33	Qualification for the American Division Playoffs
3	New Jersey Teamsters FC	14	9	1	4	24	15	+9	28	Qualification for the American Division Playoffs
4	Screaming Eagles FC	14	7	2	5	19	18	+1	23	Qualification for the American Division Playoffs
5	Catrachos De INCAEF	14	7	2	5	12	22	−10	23	
6	SGFC Eagles Maryland	14	4	2	8	18	26	−8	14	
7	Upper Darby FC	14	1	1	12	8	28	−20	4	
8	First Touch Elite Soccer	14	0	1	13	1	16	−15	1	

Rules for classification: 1) Points; 2) Goal difference; 3) Goals scored; 4) Head-to-head points; 5) Head-to-head goal difference; 6) Head-to-head goals scored; 7) Head-to-head matches won; 8) Playoff

==== American Division Playoffs ====
All games will be played at Marina Auto Stadium, home of Rochester Super 9 Pro SC.

Semifinals
July 14–Marina Auto Stadium
1 Rochester Super 9 Pro SC	2
4 Screaming Eagles FC	1
July 14–Marina Auto Stadium
2 Junior Lone Star FC II	5
3 New Jersey Teamsters FC	3

Final
July 15–Marina Auto Stadium
1 Rochester Super 9 Pro SC	2
2 Junior Lone Star FC II	1

Rochester Super 9 Pro SC advance to the Northeast Conference Playoffs.

=== Patriot Division ===
The Patriot Division covers the states of Massachusetts, New Hampshire, and Rhode Island.

The following 9 clubs joined the division for its inaugural season

- Boston Siege FC — joined from Champions Soccer League USA
- International SC — new team
- Juve-Pro Soccer — joined from New England Luso American Soccer Association
- Lincoln Club Futebol — joined from Champions Soccer League USA
- Lynn United — joined from Champions Soccer League USA
- Mass United FC — joined from American Soccer League
- New Hampshire Rapids FC — joined from Champions Soccer League USA
- Safira FC — joined from Champions Soccer League USA
- Unations FC — joined from Bay State Soccer League

==== Patriot Division Standings ====
Pos	Team	Pld	W	D	L	GF	GA	GD	Pts	Qualification
1	Safira FC	12	9	1	2	32	9	+23	28	Qualification for the Patriot Division Playoffs
2	Mass United FC	12	8	1	3	24	17	+7	25	Qualification for the Patriot Division Playoffs
3	International SC	12	7	2	3	23	17	+6	23	Qualification for the Patriot Division Playoffs
4	Lincoln Club Futebol	12	6	4	2	22	14	+8	22	Qualification for the Patriot Division Playoffs
5	Lynn United	12	7	0	5	24	18	+6	21	
6	Juve-Pro Soccer	12	4	2	6	26	21	+5	14	
7	Boston Siege FC	12	2	3	7	18	27	−9	9	
8	New Hampshire Rapids FC	12	2	1	9	8	33	−25	7	
9	Unations FC	12	2	0	10	16	37	−21	6	

Rules for classification: 1) Points; 2) Goal difference; 3) Goals scored; 4) Head-to-head points; 5) Head-to-head goal difference; 6) Head-to-head goals scored; 7) Head-to-head matches won; 8) Playoff

==== Patriot Division Playoffs ====
Semifinals
July 14–Dilboy Stadium
2 Mass United FC	2
3 International SC	0
July 14–Dilboy Stadium
1 Safira FC	0
4 Lincoln Club Futebol	2

Final
July 21–East Boston Memorial Stadium
2 Mass United FC	1
4 Lincoln Club Futebol	0

Mass United FC advance to the Northeast Conference Playoffs.

=== Northeast Conference Playoffs ===
Rochester Super 9 Pro SC, as the division champion with the most regular season points per game, will host.

Final
July 29–Marina Auto Stadium
A Rochester Super 9 Pro SC	0
P Mass United FC	2

Mass United FC advance to the National Playoffs.

== Southeast Conference ==
The Southeast Conference is new for this season. It absorbed the South Florida Conference as its Florida South Division, and then added three addition divisions with all new teams.

=== Atlanta Caribbean Division ===
The Atlanta Caribbean Division was founded through a merger with the Atlanta Caribbean Soccer League. It overlaps geographically with the Mid-Atlantic Division, with all games taking place at the Southeast Sports Compelex in Lithonia, GA.

The following 8 clubs joined the division for its inaugural season

- Atlanta Generals FC
- FC Stone Mountain
- Inferno FC — joined from Atlanta Caribbean Soccer League
- Reno United — joined from Atlanta Caribbean Soccer League
- Sambo FC — joined from Atlanta Caribbean Soccer League
- Seas Jamaica FC — joined from Atlanta Caribbean Soccer League
- VaHi Atletic FC — joined from Atlanta Caribbean Soccer League
- Yardaz FC — joined from Atlanta Caribbean Soccer League

==== Atlanta Caribbean Division Standings ====
Pos	Team	Pld	W	D	L	GF	GA	GD	Pts	Qualification
1	Inferno FC	10	8	0	2	34	15	+19	24	Qualification for the Southeast Conference Playoffs
2	Yardaz FC	10	7	0	3	24	11	+13	21	
3	Seas Jamaica FC	10	6	1	3	27	13	+14	19	
4	Atlanta Generals FC	10	6	0	4	22	14	+8	18	
5	Reno United	10	5	0	5	19	29	−10	15	
6	VaHi Atletic FC	10	3	2	5	13	16	−3	11	
7	Sambo FC	10	3	0	7	24	25	−1	9	
8	FC Stone Mountain	10	0	1	9	7	47	−40	1	

Rules for classification: 1) Points; 2) Goal difference; 3) Goals scored; 4) Head-to-head points; 5) Head-to-head goal difference; 6) Head-to-head goals scored; 7) Head-to-head matches won; 8) Playoff

=== Florida Central Division ===
The following 10 clubs joined the division for its inaugural season

- America SC — new team
- Clay County SC — new team
- Deportivo Lake Mary — joined from Orlando Premier Soccer League
- Internacional USA — new affiliate team of Brazilian club
- Inter Orlando FC — new team
- Golden Goal Sports SC — new team
- Macca Ballers FC
- Sporting Orlando — joined from Central Florida Soccer League
- St. Petersburg FC Aztecs — joined from Florida Suncoast Soccer League
- Winter Haven United FC — joined from Champions Soccer League USA and rebranded from Sisonke Simunye - Together We Are 1

==== Florida Central Division Standings ====
Pos	Team	Pld	W	D	L	GF	GA	GD	Pts	Qualification
1	Inter Orlando FC	10	7	2	1	22	13	+9	23	Qualification for the Florida Central Division Playoffs Semifinals
2	America SC	10	5	4	1	23	12	+11	19	Qualification for the Florida Central Division Playoffs Semifinals
3	St. Petersburg FC Aztecs	10	5	1	4	21	16	+5	16	Qualification for the Florida Central Division Playoffs Quarterfinals
4	Golden Goal Sports SC	10	4	3	3	15	11	+4	15	Qualification for the Florida Central Division Playoffs Quarterfinals
5	Macca Ballers FC	10	4	3	3	20	17	+3	15	Qualification for the Florida Central Division Playoffs Quarterfinals
6	Sporting Orlando	10	4	3	3	13	16	−3	15	Qualification for the Florida Central Division Playoffs Quarterfinals
7	Deportivo Lake Mary	10	3	3	4	17	18	−1	12	
8	Winter Haven United FC	9	2	3	4	12	20	−8	9	
9	Clay County SC	9	2	1	6	14	21	−7	7	
10	Internacional USA	10	0	3	7	15	28	−13	3	

Rules for classification: 1) Points; 2) Goal difference; 3) Goals scored; 4) Head-to-head points; 5) Head-to-head goal difference; 6) Head-to-head goals scored; 7) Head-to-head matches won; 8) Playoff

==== Florida Central Division Playoffs ====
Quarterfinals
July 6–Shorecrest Preparatory School
3 St. Petersburg FC Aztecs	3
6 Sporting Orlando	1
July 7–Foundation Academy
4 Golden Goal Sports SC	2
5 Macca Ballers FC	1

Semifinals
July 8–West Orange High School
2 America SC	2
3 St. Petersburg FC Aztecs	1
July 8–West Orange High School
1 Inter Orlando FC	0
4 Golden Goal Sports SC	4

Final
July 14–West Orange High School
2 America SC (p)	0 (4)
4 Golden Goal Sports SC	0 (1)

America SC advance to the Southeast Conference Playoffs.

=== Florida South Division ===
The following 2 clubs left the South Florida Conference before the season

- FC Ginga — folded
- Plantation FC — folded

The following 12 clubs joined the division before the season

- Broncos United FC — transferred from South Florida Conference
- Fullersfield FC Lions — joined from local amateur competition
- Florida Soccer Soldiers — new team
- Hebraica Miami FC
- Hialeah City FC — transferred from South Florida Conference
- Hurricane FC — joined from American Premier Soccer League
- Jupiter United SC — joined from American Premier Soccer League
- Miami Dade FC — transferred from South Florida Conference
- Miami Sun FC
- Miami Wolves FC — transferred from South Florida Conference
- Pinecrest SC — new team
- West Park FC — transferred from South Florida Conference

==== Florida South Division Standings ====
Pos	Team	Pld	W	D	L	GF	GA	GD	Pts	Qualification
1	Florida Soccer Soldiers	9	9	0	0	46	7	+39	27	Qualification for the Florida South Division Playoffs
2	Miami Sun FC	11	7	1	3	28	14	+14	22	Qualification for the Florida South Division Playoffs
3	Jupiter United SC	9	7	0	2	31	11	+20	21	Qualification for the Florida South Division Playoffs
4	Miami Wolves FC	11	7	0	4	25	20	+5	21	Qualification for the Florida South Division Playoffs
5	Hurricane FC	9	5	2	2	24	11	+13	17	Qualification for the Florida South Division Playoffs
6	Miami Dade FC	9	5	1	3	29	9	+20	16	Qualification for the Florida South Division Playoffs
7	West Park FC	10	3	2	5	11	27	−16	11	Qualification for the Florida South Division Playoffs
8	Fullersfield FC Lions	9	3	0	6	8	32	−24	9	Qualification for the Florida South Division Playoffs
9	Hebraica Miami FC	9	2	1	6	10	28	−18	7	
10	Pinecrest SC	9	2	1	6	7	26	−19	7	
11	Broncos United FC	9	1	1	7	11	16	−5	4	
12	Hialeah City FC	8	0	1	7	3	32	−29	1	

Rules for classification: 1) Points; 2) Goal difference; 3) Goals scored; 4) Head-to-head points; 5) Head-to-head goal difference; 6) Head-to-head goals scored; 7) Head-to-head matches won; 8) Playoff

==== Florida South Division Playoffs ====
Quarterfinals
July 8–Ives Estates Park
1 Florida Soccer Soldiers	8
8 Fullersfield FC Lions	0
July 8–Ives Estates Park
4 Miami Wolves FC	2
5 Hurricane FC	5
July 8–Kendall Soccer Park
2 Miami Sun FC	8
7 West Park FC	0
July 8–Cardinal Gibbons High School
3 Jupiter United SC	7
6 Miami Dade FC	2

Semifinals
July 15–Ives Estates Park
1 Florida Soccer Soldiers	4
5 Hurricane FC	1
July 15–Kendall Soccer Park
2 Miami Sun FC	5
3 Jupiter United SC	0

Final
July 19–Ives Estates Park
1 Florida Soccer Soldiers	2
2 Miami Sun FC	1

Florida Soccer Soldiers advance to the Southeast Conference Playoffs.

=== Mid-Atlantic Division ===
The Mid-Atlantic Division covers the states of Georgia, North Carolina, South Carolina, and Virginia. The division will play a 14 game home-and-away double round robin.

The following 8 clubs joined the division for its inaugural season

- Atlanta ASA FC — joined from Atlanta Caribbean Soccer League
- Bragg FC — joined from local amateur league
- Broncos United FC NC — second team of Broncos United FC of Florida South Division
- C-Ville FC — new team
- FC Cardinals — new team
- Lowcountry United FC — joined from Charleston Soccer League
- Savannah Clovers FC — new team
- Sparta 20/20 FC — new team

==== Mid-Atlantic Division Standings ====
Pos	Team	Pld	W	D	L	GF	GA	GD	Pts	Qualification
1	Lowcountry United FC	14	12	1	1	40	18	+22	37	Qualification for the Southeast Conference Playoffs
2	C-Ville FC	14	9	2	3	49	15	+34	29	
3	Savannah Clovers FC	14	9	0	5	46	24	+22	27	
4	Atlanta ASA FC	14	7	2	5	24	30	−6	23	
5	Sparta 20/20 FC	14	4	3	7	32	41	−9	15	
6	Broncos United NC	14	4	2	8	25	44	−19	14	
7	FC Cardinals	14	3	3	8	28	36	−8	12	
8	Bragg FC	14	1	1	12	16	52	−36	4	

Rules for classification: 1) Points; 2) Goal difference; 3) Goals scored; 4) Head-to-head points; 5) Head-to-head goal difference; 6) Head-to-head goals scored; 7) Head-to-head matches won; 8) Playoff

=== Southeast Conference Playoffs ===
The champions of the Florida Central and Florida South divisions played at Ives Estates Park, home of Florida Soccer Soldiers. The champions of the Mid-Atlantic and Atlanta Caribbean divisions were originally to play at the neutral location of Spartanburg Day School, home of Sparta 20/20 FC. That match was abandoned due to lightning and was rescheduled for West Orange High School, home of America SC, immediately before the conference final at the same venue.

Semifinals
July 22–Ives Estates Park
FS Florida Soccer Soldiers	2
FC America SC	1
July 28–West Orange High School
MA Lowcountry United FC (p)	2 (4)
AC Inferno FC	2 (1)

Final
July 28–West Orange High School
FS Florida Soccer Soldiers	5
MA Lowcountry United FC	0

Florida Soccer Soldiers advance to the National Playoffs.

== Southwest Conference ==
The Southwest Conference is new for this season. It was formed from the Arizona clubs from the Desert Mountain Conference, and also includes New Mexico and West Texas. The conference was originally going to contain Nevada clubs as well, but ultimately none competed in this season.

The following 3 Nevada clubs left the Desert Mountain Conference before the season

- Las Vegas City FC — folded
- Las Vegas Mobsters — folded
- Las Vegas Soccer Club — folded

The following 6 clubs joined the conference for its inaugural season

- Arizona Scorpions — returned from 1 season hiatus
- FC Grande — joined from Mesilla Valley Soccer League
- MSC United — new team
- Southwest FC — new team
- Sporting AZ FC — transferred from Desert Mountain Conference
- Sporting AZ FC II — new reserve team of Sporting AZ FC

=== Southwest Conference standings ===
Pos	Team	Pld	W	D	L	GF	GA	GD	Pts	Qualification
1	Sporting AZ FC	10	9	0	1	25	2	+23	27	Qualification for the Southwest Conference Playoffs
2	FC Grande	10	5	2	3	21	13	+8	17	Qualification for the Southwest Conference Playoffs
3	MSC United	10	5	2	3	17	16	+1	17	Qualification for the Southwest Conference Playoffs
4	Southwest FC	10	5	1	4	16	17	−1	16	Qualification for the Southwest Conference Playoffs
5	Sporting AZ FC II	10	2	1	7	7	22	−15	7	
6	Arizona Scorpions	10	1	0	9	3	19	−16	3	

Rules for classification: 1) Points; 2) Goal difference; 3) Goals scored; 4) Head-to-head points; 5) Head-to-head goal difference; 6) Head-to-head goals scored; 7) Head-to-head matches won; 8) Playoff

=== Southwest Conference Playoffs ===
Semifinals
July 7–Chandler–Gilbert CC
1 Sporting AZ FC	3
4 Southwest FC	2
July 6–High Noon Soccer Complex
2 FC Grande	3
3 MSC United	2

Final
July 14–Chandler–Gilbert CC
1 Sporting AZ FC	2
2 FC Grande	0

Sporting AZ FC advance to the National Playoffs.

== Western Conference ==
=== SoCal Division ===
==== Pro Premier ====
The following 6 clubs left the division before the season

- Anaheim Legacy FC — relegated to Championship Division
- Bell Gardens FC — relegated to Championship Division
- Orange County FC 2 — hiatus, due to Spring NPSL season
- San Diego Zest FC 2 — hiatus, due to Spring PDL season
- Strikers FC South Coast — folded
- Vanquish FC — folded

The following 5 clubs joined the division before the season

- Lionside FC — promoted from Championship Division
- Newcastle United FC — promoted from Championship Division
- Ontario Fury II — new outdoor team of Major Arena Soccer League club
- Panamerican FC — promoted from Championship Division
- San Diego Premier Pros FC

The following 2 clubs rebranded before the season

- California United FC II — rebranded from OC Invicta.
- L.A. Galaxy OC PSC — rebranded from PSC Football Club

===== Pro Premier Standings =====
Pos	Team	Pld	W	D	L	GF	GA	GD	Pts	Qualification
1	California United FC II	13	13	0	0	70	8	+62	39	Qualification for the SoCal Division Pro Premier Playoffs Semifinals
2	L.A. Wolves FC	13	9	1	3	43	19	+24	28	Qualification for the SoCal Division Pro Premier Playoffs Semifinals
3	Santa Ana Winds FC	13	9	0	4	40	21	+19	27	Qualification for the SoCal Division Pro Premier Playoffs Quarterfinals
4	La Máquina FC	13	8	3	2	34	18	+16	27	Qualification for the SoCal Division Pro Premier Playoffs Quarterfinals
5	Sporting San Fernando	13	9	0	4	31	26	+5	27	Qualification for the SoCal Division Pro Premier Playoffs Quarterfinals
6	L.A. Galaxy OC PSC	13	8	1	4	43	23	+20	25	Qualification for the SoCal Division Pro Premier Playoffs Quarterfinals
7	San Diego Premier Pros FC	13	7	0	6	20	31	−11	21	
8	Newcastle United FC	13	5	1	7	30	31	−1	16	
9	Lionside FC	13	4	3	6	27	29	−2	15	
10	Santa Clarita Storm	13	4	1	8	22	30	−8	13	
11	Valley United SC	13	4	0	9	15	38	−23	12	
12	Panamerican FC	13	3	2	8	16	35	−19	11	
13	Ontario Fury II	13	1	0	12	11	50	−39	3	
14	SFV Scorpions FC	13	0	2	11	7	50	−43	2	

Rules for classification: 1) Points; 2) Goal difference; 3) Goals scored; 4) Head-to-head points; 5) Head-to-head goal difference; 6) Head-to-head goals scored; 7) Head-to-head matches won; 8) Playoff

===== Pro Premier Playoffs =====
Quarterfinals
July 15–Lake Forest Sports Complex
3 Santa Ana Winds FC	4
6 L.A. Galaxy OC PSC	1
July 14–Lake Forest Sports Complex
4 La Máquina FC	2 (0)
5 Sporting San Fernando (p)	2 (2)

Semifinals
July 22–Lake Forest Sports Complex
2 L.A. Wolves FC	1 (3)
3 Santa Ana Winds FC (p)	1 (4)
1 California United FC II
5 Sporting San Fernando	w/o

Final
July 28–Lake Forest Sports Complex
3 Santa Ana Winds FC (p)	3 (4)
5 Sporting San Fernando	3 (3)

==== Championship ====
The following 12 clubs left the division before the season

- Atlas FC USA — folded
- Black Gold Oil FC — folded
- Del Rey City SC — folded
- L.A. Wolves FC Reserves — folded
- Lionside FC — promoted to Pro Premier Division
- Long Beach City FC — folded
- Newcastle United FC — promoted to Pro Premier Division
- Pacific Side FC — folded
- Panamerican FC — promoted to Pro Premier Division
- San Fernando Valley FC — folded
- Strikers FC SC Reserves — folded
- United Football Academy Hawks — folded

The following 14 clubs joined the division before the season

- Anaheim FC
- Anaheim Legacy FC — relegated from Pro Premier Division
- Bell Gardens FC — relegated from Pro Premier Division
- Disciples FC
- High Desert FC — new team
- Inland Empire FC — returned from 2 season hiatus
- Kern County Mustangs FC — new team
- L.A. Galaxy OC PSC II — second team of Pro Premier club
- La Habra City FC — returned from 2 season hiatus
- MX Dream Soccer Club
- Revolution FC
- San Nicolas FC — returned from 1 season hiatus
- USA/MEX SoCal
- USA Soccer Stars FC — returned from 1 season hiatus

===== Championship Standings =====
Pos	Team	Pld	W	D	L	GF	GA	GD	Pts	Qualification
1	San Nicolas FC	21	16	0	5	78	24	+54	48	Promotion to the Pro Premier
2	CF Cachorros USA	21	15	3	3	55	22	+33	48	Promotion to the Pro Premier
3	Kern County Mustangs FC	21	14	3	4	79	27	+52	45	Qualification for the SoCal Division Championship Playoffs
4	High Desert FC	21	14	2	5	65	30	+35	44	Qualification for the SoCal Division Championship Playoffs
5	La Habra City FC	21	14	1	6	79	26	+53	43	
6	Newhall Premier FC	21	13	2	6	57	38	+19	41	Qualification for the SoCal Division Championship Playoffs
7	Anaheim Legacy FC	21	13	2	6	52	46	+6	41	Qualification for the SoCal Division Championship Playoffs
8	L.A. Roma FC	21	12	2	7	59	48	+11	38	
9	USA Soccer Stars FC	21	10	4	7	42	33	+9	34	
10	Revolution FC	21	10	3	8	45	49	−4	33	
11	MX Dream Soccer Club	20	8	4	8	28	41	−13	28	
12	Newport FC	21	8	4	9	42	58	−16	28	
13	L.A. Galaxy OC PSC II	18	8	3	7	30	28	+2	27	
14	SoCal Troop FC	21	8	2	11	47	52	−5	26	
15	Anaheim FC	20	8	1	11	44	50	−6	25	
16	Tiburones Rojos USA	21	7	3	11	32	62	−30	24	
17	Disciples FC	21	6	2	13	36	58	−22	20	
18	Inland Empire FC	21	6	1	14	36	56	−20	19	
19	Toros Neza USA	21	4	2	15	31	56	−25	14	
20	USA/MEX SoCal	21	3	4	14	40	63	−23	13	
21	Fontana International SC	20	3	2	15	33	83	−50	11	
22	Bell Gardens FC	19	1	2	16	18	78	−60	5	

Rules for classification: 1) Points; 2) Goal difference; 3) Goals scored; 4) Head-to-head points; 5) Head-to-head goal difference; 6) Head-to-head goals scored; 7) Head-to-head matches won; 8) Playoff

===== Championship Playoffs =====
Semifinals
August 25–Glendale Sports Complex
3 Kern County Mustangs
7 Anaheim Legacy FC
August 25–Ranchero Middle School
4 High Desert FC	1
6 Newhall Premier FC	0

Final
August 26–Lake Forest Sports Park
3 Kern County Mustangs	2
4 High Desert FC	1

=== Wild West Division ===
For this season, the Red and Blue divisions were merged into a single Wild West Division as a part of the Western Conference. The division was expanded to include the state of Oregon. It will play a 12 game home-or-away single round robin.

The following 4 clubs left the Wild West Conference before the season

- Azteca FC — folded
- CD Aguiluchos USA U23 — folded
- FC Sacramento — folded
- Oakland Pamperos — folded

The following 7 clubs joined the division before the season

- AFC San Francisco Hearts — new team
- Chico City Rangers FC — joined from Pacific Premier League
- Napa Sporting SC — joined from NorCal Liga
- Redding Royals FC — joined from Pacific Premier League
- San Leandro United FC
- Southern Oregon Starphire FC — joined from Pacific Premier League
- Visalia Golden Bears

The following 2 clubs rebranded before the season

- East Bay FC Tecos Fire rebranded from East Bay FC Stompers Juniors
- Nevada Coyotes FC rebranded from Western Nevada FC

==== Wild West Division Standings ====
Pos	Team	Pld	W	D	L	GF	GA	GD	Pts	Qualification
1	Nevada Coyotes FC	12	11	1	0	55	10	+45	34	Qualification for the Wild West Division Playoffs Semifinals
2	California Victory FC	12	10	1	1	47	17	+30	31	Qualification for the Wild West Division Playoffs Semifinals
3	Napa Sporting SC	12	8	1	3	31	20	+11	25	Qualification for the Wild West Division Playoffs Quarterfinals
4	JASA RWC	12	7	2	3	30	23	+7	23	Qualification for the Wild West Division Playoffs Quarterfinals
5	AFC San Francisco Hearts	12	6	2	4	24	23	+1	20	Qualification for the Wild West Division Playoffs Quarterfinals
6	Chico City Rangers FC	12	5	3	4	45	37	+8	18	Qualification for the Wild West Division Playoffs Quarterfinals
7	Southern Oregon Starphire FC	12	4	2	6	22	20	+2	14	
8	Real San Jose	12	4	2	6	24	28	−4	14	
9	Redding Royals FC	12	4	1	7	21	24	−3	13	
10	East Bay FC Tecos Fire	12	4	1	7	18	40	−22	13	
11	San Leandro United FC	12	3	2	7	18	34	−16	11	
12	Dynamos FC	12	2	1	9	21	46	−25	7	
13	Visalia Golden Bears	12	0	1	11	11	45	−34	1	

Rules for classification: 1) Points; 2) Goal difference; 3) Goals scored; 4) Head-to-head points; 5) Head-to-head goal difference; 6) Head-to-head goals scored; 7) Head-to-head matches won; 8) Playoff

==== Wild West Division Cup ====
Concurrently with the season, all Wild West Division teams except for Visalia Golden Bears took part in a knockout competition.

Round 1
May 19
East Bay FC Tecos Fire	3
JASA RWC	2
May 19
Redding Royals FC	0 (2)
Starphire FC (p)	0 (3)
May 19
Chico City Rangers FC	0
AFC San Francisco Hearts	2
May 19
Napa Sporting SC	1
California Victory FC	4

Round 2
June 9–Golden Eagle Regional Park
Nevada Coyotes FC	2
East Bay FC Tecos Fire	0
June 9–Ashland High School
Starphire FC	5
Real San Jose	1
June 9–Burrell Field
San Leandro United FC (p)	1 (5)
AFC San Francisco Hearts	1 (4)
June 9–Tiffany Roberts Soccer Field
Dynamos FC	0
California Victory FC	5

Semifinals
June 30–Golden Eagle Regional Park
Nevada Coyotes FC	2
Starphire FC	0
June 23
San Leandro United FC	(2)
California Victory FC (p)	(4)

Final
July 21–Dougherty Valley High School
Nevada Coyotes FC (p)	1(11)
California Victory FC	1(10)

==== Wild West Division Playoffs ====
Quarterfinals
June 30–Justin-Siena High School
3 Napa Sporting SC	1 (1)
6 Chico City Rangers FC (p)	1 (4)
June 30–Red Morton Park
4 JASA RWC	4
5 AFC San Francisco Hearts	1

Semifinals
July 7–Golden Eagle Regional Park
1 Nevada Coyotes FC	9
6 Chico City Rangers FC	0
July 7–Red Morton Park
2 California Victory FC	3 (3)
4 JASA RWC (p)	3 (5)

Final
July 28–Golden Eagle Regional Park
1 Nevada Coyotes FC	4
4 JASA RWC	0

=== Western Conference Playoffs ===
Final
August 4–Rabobank Stadium
SC Santa Ana Winds FC	3
WW Nevada Coyotes FC	0

Santa Ana Winds FC advance to the National Playoffs.

== National Playoffs ==
The national playoffs will be played in Arvada, Colorado and Lakewood, Colorado on August 10–12, hosted by Athletic Club of Sloan's Lake. Teams were randomly paired by draw on July 30.

Qualified teams:

- Central Conference: Inocentes FC
- Colorado Conference: FC Boulder
- Midwest Conference: Milwaukee Bavarian SC
- Mountain Conference: Boise Cutthroats FC
- Northeast Conference: Mass United FC
- Southeast Conference: Florida Soccer Soldiers
- Southwest Conference: Sporting AZ FC
- Western Conference: Santa Ana Winds FC

Quarterfinals
August 10–Trailblazer Stadium
NE Mass United FC	2 (2)
MW Milwaukee Bavarian SC (p)	2 (4)
August 10–Trailblazer Stadium
CE Inocentes FC	0
SE Florida Soccer Soldiers	2
August 10–North Area Athletic Complex
SW Sporting AZ FC	2
MO Boise Cutthroats FC	1
August 10–North Area Athletic Complex
CO FC Boulder	1 (3)
W Santa Ana Winds FC (p)	1 (4)

Semifinals
August 11–North Area Athletic Complex
MW Milwaukee Bavarian SC	2
SE Florida Soccer Soldiers	0
August 11–North Area Athletic Complex
SW Sporting AZ FC	2
W Santa Ana Winds FC	1

Final
August 12–North Area Athletic Complex
MW Milwaukee Bavarian SC	3
SW Sporting AZ FC	2
