= LA 10 FC =

American soccer team

- Full name: LA 10 Football Club
- Short name: LA10
- Founded: 2016; 9 years ago
- Stadium: Birmingham High School; Lake Balboa, Los Angeles
- Capacity: 11,000
- Owner: Alessandro Del Piero; Jeffrey Whalen; EDGE Americas Sports
- President: Jeffrey Whalen
- Coach: Leon Sharf
- League: United Premier Soccer League
- Website: https://la10fc.net/

LA 10 FC is an American soccer team playing in the United Premier Soccer League. The club is partly owned by former Italian international and World Cup winner Alessandro Del Piero, and the club name bears his jersey number.

== History ==
LA 10 FC was founded in 2016. The ownership group consists of former Italian national team player Alessandro Del Piero, EDGE Americas Sports (of which Del Piero is a co-founder), and Del Piero's business partner, Jeffrey Whalen. The club name references his iconic number 10 jersey with the team colors of black and white referencing his former club Juventus. In their debut season in 2018, the club had an undefeated season in the 2018 UPSL SoCal North Championship Division, earning promotion to the UPSL SoCal North Division 1 for 2019.
