= Ontario Fury II =

Empire Jets
- Logo used prior to 2022-23 season
- Founded: Indoor: 2017; Outdoor: 2018
- Dissolved: 2019
- Ground: Indoor: Upland Arena; Upland, California; Outdoor: Silverlakes Sports Complex; Eastvale, California
- General Manager: Bernie Lilavois
- League: Indoor: Major Arena Soccer League 2 Outdoor: United Premier Soccer League
- Website: http://www.ontariofury.com/fury-ii

The Empire Jets are the name of an American professional indoor soccer team based in Upland, California and an outdoor team based in Eastvale, California. Like their parent club, the Empire Strykers, they're both run by the general manager.

== History ==
=== Major Arena Soccer League 2 (2017–2019, 2021–present) ===
Founded in 2017, the team made its debut in the Major Arena Soccer League 2, a developmental league for the Major Arena Soccer League at the start of the 2017–18 season. The team played its home games at the Upland Arena, are the reserve team for the Ontario Fury of the MASL and were charter members of the M2. The indoor version was folded by the parent club in 2019.

==== The Return ====
On July 15, 2021, M2 announced the return of Fury II starting in the 2021–2022 season.

=== United Premier Soccer League (2018–2019) ===
In 2018, an outdoor soccer team was formed to play in the United Premier Soccer League. They will play their home matches at Silverlakes Sports Complex in Eastvale, California Like the indoor team, the parent club folded the UPSL club.
