= List of people from Tigard, Oregon =

The following list includes notable people who were born or have lived in Tigard, Oregon.

== Academics and writing ==
- Margaret Bechard, science fiction writer
- Katherine Dunn, novelist and journalist
- R. P. Hunnicutt, historian
- Lori L. Lake, fiction writer

== Business and finance ==
- Peggy Fowler, former CEO of PGE
- Leif Hansen, auto body shop owner

== Entertainment ==
- Jeff Gianola, news anchor for KOIN
- Kaitlin Olson, actress
- Summer Lynne Seasons, drag performer

== Politics and law ==
- Daniel Bonham, member of the state senate
- Margaret Doherty, member of the house of representatives
- Mike Erickson, U.S. house candidate
- Larry Galizio, member of the house of representatives
- Dacia Grayber, member of the house of representatives
- Gary Hansen, member of the house of representatives and county commissioner
- Courtney Neron Misslin, member of the house of representatives
- Jerralynn Ness, anti-poverty advocate
- Dan Rayfield, speaker of the house of representatives
- Andrea Salinas, U.S. representative, former state representative
- Norm Smith, member of the house of representatives
- Philip Toelkes, mayor of Rajneeshpuram
- Pat Whiting, member of the house of representatives
- Max Williams, member of the house of representatives and Department of Corrections director

== Sports ==
- Jeremy Beard, baseball coach and pitcher
- Steve Cooke, baseball player
- Kevin Duckworth, basketball player
- Johnny Frederick, baseball player
- Shaler Halimon, basketball player
- Nico Harrison, owner of the Dallas Mavericks
- Mike Kinkade, baseball coach
- Kevin Kunnert, basketball coach
- Eddie Kuzma, racing car builder
- Owen Marecic, football player

== Technology ==
- Marcus Bromander, creator of game Among Us
- John Hershberger, computer scientist
