= United Premier Soccer League =

American soccer league

- Founded: 2011; 15 years ago
- Country: United States
- Confederation: CONCACAF; US Soccer
- Divisions: 40
- Number of clubs: 900+
- Promotion to: Premier Division (Internal)
- Relegation to: Division I (Internal)
- Domestic cup: U.S. Open Cup
- Current champions: Deportivo Rose City (1st title) (2026 Spring)
- Most championships: California United FC II; OC Crew; Soda City FC (2 titles each)
- Broadcaster: Eleven Sports
- Website: upsl.com
- Current: 2026 Fall

The United Premier Soccer League (UPSL) is an American for-profit soccer league that was founded in Santa Ana in Southern California, with teams in regionalized conferences throughout the United States, and recently Canada and Mexico. The league was founded in 2011 by Santa Ana Winds President Leonel López as a regional league for teams in Greater Los Angeles, but expanded to include 900+ teams from 50 states as of the 2026 season.

Two seasons are played each year, with regional play culminating in a playoff system that crowns a single national champion each season. The league features internal promotion and relegation with up to three levels in some regions; only clubs in the top-tier Premier Division are eligible to compete for the national championship.

The league is a National Affiliate member of United States Soccer Federation, and a National League within the larger United States soccer league system.

== History ==
The UPSL was formed in 2011 with 10 teams, and has grown to include over 900+ men's and women's member clubs across the nation. Now featuring numerous MLS U19 teams, the Premier Division is widely regarded as occupying the unofficial 4th tier of US Soccer. Each UPSL team is independently owned and operated. The league consists of two seasons each calendar year, with the Spring season beginning in March and ending with national playoffs in July, and a Fall season with play beginning in September and national playoffs in December.

UPSL announced it would begin a promotion/relegation system beginning in 2017. Teams will compete in two divisions: Premier and Division One.

=== U.S. Open Cup ===
Former member club PSA Elite is known for reaching the fourth round of the 2014 and the 2015 Lamar Hunt U.S. Open Cup by knocking out higher-level professional teams. Three UPSL teams, La Máquina FC, L.A. Wolves FC, and San Nicolas FC qualified for the 2016 U.S. Open Cup. La Máquina FC advanced to the fourth round (knocking out Portland Timbers U23, Sacramento Gold, and LA Wolves FC) before falling to LA Galaxy. The UPSL's participants in the 2016 US Open Cup altogether defeated teams from the PDL (Timbers U-23), NPSL (Sacramento Gold), and USL (Orange County Blues FC). The UPSL had five teams qualify for the 2017 U.S. Open Cup, with the L.A. Wolves FC advancing the furthest, making it to the third round before being knocked out by USL team Orange County SC. 2018 saw five more UPSL teams qualify for the U.S. Open Cup, with Sporting Arizona FC before falling to USL team Fresno FC. Only one team, Florida Soccer Soldiers qualified from UPSL for the 2019 U.S. Open Cup, advancing to the third round prior to losing to USL Championship team North Carolina FC. The U.S. Open cup was not held in 2020 or 2021 due to COVID-19. UPSL had four teams qualify for the 2022 U.S. Open Cup with two teams advancing to the second round of the competition. In 2023, UPSL only had two teams qualify for the U.S. Open Cup, with UDA Soccer advancing to the second round before falling to USL Championship team New Mexico United. With more slots being taken in the tournament proper by USL League 2 and National Premier Soccer League teams, the UPSL had seen a decrease in the number of teams to make it through the qualifying rounds. Starting in 2024, UPSL is guaranteed a slot in the first round of the Open Cup. This slot is given to the UPSL Spring Champions, and in 2024 was earned by AS Frenzi. For the 2025 U.S. Open Cup, Soda City FC earned the automatic first round slot by winning the 2024 UPSL Spring season. For the 2026 U.S. Open Cup it was Tennessee Tempo FC who secured a spot in the main draw after winning the 2025 Spring Season of the UPSL. Starting in 2027 U.S. Soccer announced that the UPSL would earn two automatic bids in the U.S. Open Cup based on the results of their spring season. For 2027 U.S. Open Cup, Deportivo Rose City and Miami United FC earned the two automatic spots by advancing to the spring final.

== Men's League Divisions ==
=== Premier Division ===
Region	Conference	Team	City/area	Stadium
Northeast
Northeast	American North			
Northeast	American North	FC Ulqini	Staten Island, New York	Fairview Park Athletic Field
Northeast	American North	Haiti United FC	Brooklyn, New York	Old Boys Field
Northeast	American North	Latin Power FC	Ridgewood, New York	Randall's Island Park
Northeast	American North	New York Braveheart SC	Central Islip, New York	Tully Park
Northeast	American North	NY Empire FC	Long Island, New York	SUSA Orlin & Cohen Sports Complex
Northeast	American North	NY Renegades FC	Brooklyn, New York	The Stadium at Memorial Field
Northeast	American North	OSNER'S FC	Brooklyn, New York	Queens College Varsity Soccer Field
Northeast	American North	Red Hook FC	Brooklyn, New York	Red Hook Field
Northeast	American North	Rosedale Soccer Club	Queens, New York	Roy Wilkins Park
Northeast	American South-Garden			
Northeast	American South-Garden	Allstars FC	Clifton, New Jersey	Anzaldi Park
Northeast	American South-Garden	Cosmos B	Paterson, New Jersey	Hinchliffe Stadium
Northeast	American South-Garden	Five Rivers SC	Carteret, New Jersey	Joseph Medwick Park
Northeast	American South-Garden	Giuseppe Rossi Academy	Lyndhurst, New Jersey	Lyndhurst Recreation Center
Northeast	American South-Garden	Ironbound SCP	Newark, New Jersey	Heroes of Ukraine Field
Northeast	American South-Garden	New Jersey Alliance FC	Newark, New Jersey	Newark Schools Stadium
Northeast	American South-Garden	SFC 1924	Whippany, New Jersey	Heroes of Ukraine Field
Northeast	American South-Garden	UCFSC Warriors	Rahway, New Jersey	Rahway River Park
Northeast	American South-Garden	Union SC	Union Township, New Jersey	Volunteer Field
Northeast	American South-Keystone			
Northeast	American South-Keystone	Capital City Islanders	Harrisburg, Pennsylvania	Skyline Sports Complex
Northeast	American South-Keystone	Cumberland Valley SC	Chambersburg, Pennsylvania	Veterans Memorial Park
Northeast	American South-Keystone	Pennsylvania Classics	Lancaster, Pennsylvania	Donald H. Funk Field at Willis & Martha Herr Stadium
Northeast	American South-Keystone	Pennsylvania Prime FC	Allentown, Pennsylvania	Cedar Crest College
Northeast	American South-Keystone	Philadelphia Lone Star FC	Wayne, Pennsylvania	YSC Sports Stadium
Northeast	American South-Keystone	Philadelphia Union III	Chester, Pennsylvania	WSFS Bank Sportsplex
Northeast	American South-Keystone	YorkPA FC	York, Pennsylvania	York College of Pennsylvania
Northeast	DMV-North			
Northeast	DMV-North	Arlington SA	Arlington, Virginia	Thomas Jefferson High School
Northeast	DMV-North	Bowleys Athletic	Bowleys Quarters, Maryland	Eastern Regional Park
Northeast	DMV-North	Bridge Sport Club	Laurel, Maryland	Laurel High School
Northeast	DMV-North	DC Hyper	Washington, D.C.	Maryland SoccerPlex
Northeast	DMV-North	Doradus FC	Springfield, Virginia	Annandale High School
Northeast	DMV-North	Hub City FC	Hagerstown, Maryland	North Hagerstown High School
Northeast	DMV-North	Los Toros	Great Falls, Virginia	South Lakes High School
Northeast	DMV-North	MoCo 1776 FC	Montgomery County, Maryland	Hood College
Northeast	DMV-North	MSI	Rockville, Maryland	Montgomery Blair High School
Northeast	DMV-North	Virginia Dream FC	Falls Church, Virginia	Meridan High School
Northeast	DMV-South			
Northeast	DMV-South	Alexandria Reds	Alexandria, Virginia	Limerick Field
Northeast	DMV-South	Alexandria United FC	Alexandria, Virginia	West Potomac High School
Northeast	DMV-South	Blue Ridge FC	Harrisonburg, Virginia	Horizon Edge Sports Campus
Northeast	DMV-South	Grove United	Richmond, Virginia	Monacan High School
Northeast	DMV-South	Northern Virginia United	Fairfax, Virginia	Gainesville High School
Northeast	DMV-South	Skyline Elite SC	Charlottesville, Virginia	Charlottesville High School
Northeast	New England			
Northeast	New England	Beech Street FC	Nashua, New Hampshire	West High School
Northeast	New England	Boston Emeralds FC	Dorchester, Massachusetts	Boston College High School
Northeast	New England	Boston Street FC	Boston, Massachusetts	Manning Field
Northeast	New England	Brockton FC United	Brockton, Massachusetts	The English High School
Northeast	New England	Fall River FC	Fall River, Massachusetts	Britland Park
Northeast	New England	GZS Bridgeport FC	Bridgeport, Connecticut	John F. Kennedy Stadium
Northeast	New England	Hartford Athletic II	Hartford, Connecticut	Trinity Health Stadium
Northeast	New England	Jaguars United FC	Everett, Massachusetts	Hormel Stadium
Northeast	New England	South Coast Union	New Bedford, Massachusetts	Greater New Bedford Voc-Tech
Northeast	New England	Unations FC	Worcester, Massachusetts	Morse Field
Northeast	New England	United Africa FC	Boston, Massachusetts	Madison Park High School
Southeast
Southeast	Florida-Central			
Southeast	Florida-Central	Bold City SC	Jacksonville, Florida	Fort Family Park
Southeast	Florida-Central	Brevard SC	Palm Bay, Florida	Palm Bay High School
Southeast	Florida-Central	Emerald FC	Orlando, Florida	Bishop Moore Catholic High School
Southeast	Florida-Central	FC America Spurs	Winter Park, Florida	
Southeast	Florida-Central	Harbor City FC	Melbourne, Florida	Palm Bay High School
Southeast	Florida-Central	JAX United FC	Jacksonville, Florida	
Southeast	Florida-Central	Kissimmee FC	Kissimmee, Florida	Airport Lakes Park
Southeast	Florida-Central	Montverde Academy	Montverde, Florida	
Southeast	Florida-Central	OFC Barca	Orlando, Florida	Celebration Civic Corridor Athletic Fields
Southeast	Florida-Central	Shark Coast FC	New Smyrna Beach, Florida	New Smyrna Beach Stadium
Southeast	Florida-Central	Stetson FA	Deland, Florida	Rinker Field
Southeast	Florida South-North			
Southeast	Florida South-North	Florida Badgers FC	Boynton Beach, Florida	Ezell Community Center
Southeast	Florida South-North	Florida Elite FC Wolves	Broward, Florida	Flamingo West Park; Terramar Park
Southeast	Florida South-North	Inter Miami CF U17	Fort Lauderdale, Florida	
Southeast	Florida South-North	Palm Beach Flames SC	West Palm Beach, Florida	Bulldog Stadium
Southeast	Florida South-North	Parkland Soccer Club	Parkland, Florida	Terramar Park; Pine Trails Park
Southeast	Florida South-North	Rush Select Academy	Port St. Lucie, Florida	Sandpiper Bay Resort
Southeast	Florida South-North	Team Boca	Boca Raton, Florida	
Southeast	Florida South-South			
Southeast	Florida South-South	Athletum FC	Miami, Florida	
Southeast	Florida South-South	Cyclones AFA	Pembroke Pines, Florida	
Southeast	Florida South-South	Davie United SC	Davie, Florida	
Southeast	Florida South-South	Empire SC	Weston, Florida	UPSL Stadium
Southeast	Florida South-South	FC Miami City	Fort Lauderdale, Florida	
Southeast	Florida South-South	Florida Elite ESP FC	Miami, Florida	
Southeast	Florida South-South	Florida Soccer Soldiers	Miramar, Florida	UPSL Stadium
Southeast	Florida South-South	Inter Miami CF Academy	Miami, Florida	Florida Blue Training Center
Southeast	Florida South-South	Miami FC U20	Doral, Florida	Pitbull Stadium
Southeast	Florida South-South	Miami United FC	Miami, Florida	Ted Hendricks Stadium
Southeast	Florida South-South	Plantation FC	Plantation, Florida	PAL Soccer Complex and Stadium
Southeast	Florida-West			
Southeast	Florida-West	Benfica Residential Academy	St. Leo, Florida	
Southeast	Florida-West	Cape Coral City FC	Cape Coral, Florida	
Southeast	Florida-West	Clearwater Chargers SC	Clearwater, Florida	Countryside Sports Complex
Southeast	Florida-West	FC Tampa Rangers	Tampa, Florida	Oscar Cooler Sports Complex
Southeast	Florida-West	Florida Celtic SC	Largo, Florida	
Southeast	Florida-West	Florida Premier FC	Tampa, Florida	Srarkley Ranch District Park
Southeast	Florida-West	Inter City FC	Fort Myers, Florida	Fort Myers High School
Southeast	Florida-West	Lakeland United	Lakeland, Florida	Bryant Stadium
Southeast	Florida-West	PCU Pelicans SC	St. Petersburg, Florida	Eckerd College; Walter Fuller Soccer Complex
Southeast	Florida-West	Sarasota Paradise	Sarasota, Florida	Premier Sports Campus
Southeast	Florida-West	Shock City FC	Clearwater, Florida	Skyway Park; Putnam Park
Southeast	Florida-West	SWFL SC	Babcock Ranch, Florida	
Southeast	Florida-West	West Florida Flames	Brandon, Florida	JC Handley Sports Complex
Southeast	Georgia-East			
Southeast	Georgia-East	Angelus	Warner Robins, Georgia	Macon Soccer Complex
Southeast	Georgia-East	Georgia Athletic SC	Lawrenceville, Georgia	Discovery High School
Southeast	Georgia-East	Kalonji Pro-Profile	Lawrenceville, Georgia	Shiloh Stadium
Southeast	Georgia-East	Lake Country United FC	Greensboro, Georgia	Greene County Stadium
Southeast	Georgia-East	LSA Mustangs	Norcross, Georgia	Meadowcreek High School
Southeast	Georgia-East	Pachuca Georgia	Lilburn, Georgia	Bethesda Park
Southeast	Georgia-East	SSL FC	Norcross, Georgia	Shiloh Stadium
Southeast	Georgia-East	UFA Lawrenceville	Lawrenceville, Georgia	Rhodes Jordan Park Turf Field
Southeast	Georgia-West			
Southeast	Georgia-West	Atlanta United Academy	Marietta, Georgia	Atlanta United Training Ground
Southeast	Georgia-West	FC Columbus Elite	Columbus, Georgia	Odis Spencer Stadium
Southeast	Georgia-West	Georgia Impact SC	Canton, Georgia	Tommy Baker Field
Southeast	Georgia-West	Georgia Revolution FC	McDonough, Georgia	Old Warhawk Stadium
Southeast	Georgia-West	LAX FC	Columbus, Georgia	Odis Spencer Stadium
Southeast	Georgia-West	Potros FC	Powder Springs, Georgia	Cass High School
Southeast	Georgia-West	Red Top SC	Cartersville, Georgia	Cass High School
Southeast	Georgia-West	UMA FC	LaGrange, Georgia	Lanett High School; Lafayette Christian School
Southeast	KY-TN			
Southeast	KY-TN	Ash Gold FC	Mt. Juliet, Tennessee	Rockvale High School
Southeast	KY-TN	Chattanooga FC II	Chattanooga, Tennessee	Montague Park
Southeast	KY-TN	Chattanooga Kaistorms FC	Chattanooga, Tennessee	Boyd Buchanan Stadium
Southeast	KY-TN	Chattanooga Red Wolves II	Chattanooga, Tennessee	CHI Memorial Stadium
Southeast	KY-TN	Cleveland United FC	Cleveland, Tennessee	Bear Stadium
Southeast	KY-TN	Morazan ZLA FC	Nashville, Tennessee	Rose Park
Southeast	KY-TN	Scenic City SC	Chattanooga, Tennessee	Chattanooga School for the Liberal Arts
Southeast	KY-TN	Tennessee Tempo FC	Nashville, Tennessee	Richard Siegel Soccer Stadium
Southeast	KY-TN	Tennessee United SC	Hendersonville, Tennessee	Drakes Creek Park
Southeast	Mid-Atlantic North			
Southeast	Mid-Atlantic North	Briar United FC	Raleigh, North Carolina	Pleasent Park
Southeast	Mid-Atlantic North	Cardinal FC	Roanoke, Virginia	River's Edge Park
Southeast	Mid-Atlantic North	Combine Academy	Charlotte, North Carolina	Combine Stadium
Southeast	Mid-Atlantic North	Emory FC	Emory, Virginia	Fred Selfe Stadium
Southeast	Mid-Atlantic North	Gastonia City FC	Gastonia, North Carolina	George Poston Park
Southeast	Mid-Atlantic North	Neuse River FA	Clayton, North Carolina	Clayton High School
Southeast	Mid-Atlantic North	Pro-finish Management FC	Harrisburg, North Carolina	OrthoCarolina Sportsplex
Southeast	Mid-Atlantic North	Tar Devils SC	Chapel Hill, North Carolina	Herndon Championship Field
Southeast	Mid-Atlantic South			
Southeast	Mid-Atlantic South	Gastonia FC Strikers	Gastonia, North Carolina	George Paston Park
Southeast	Mid-Atlantic South	Mint Hill FC	Mint Hill, North Carolina	Mint Hill Veterans Memorial Park
Southeast	Mid-Atlantic South	Pre-College DA	Pineville, North Carolina	Richard Siegel Soccer Complex
Southeast	Mid-Atlantic South	SCU Heat	Columbia, South Carolina	Southeastern Freight Lines Soccer Complex
Southeast	Mid-Atlantic South	Sanford Area Soccer League	Sanford, North Carolina	Southern Lee High School
Southeast	Mid-Atlantic South	South Carolina Surf	Mount Pleasant, South Carolina	Shea Family Fields
Midwest
Midwest	Midwest Central			
Midwest	Midwest Central	Berber City FC	Chicago, Illinois	Stuart Field
Midwest	Midwest Central	Chicago Nation FC	Chicago, Illinois	College of DuPage
Midwest	Midwest Central	Chicago Strikers	Chicago, Illinois	College of DuPage
Midwest	Midwest Central	Ethos Academy Chicago	Chicago, Illinois	Lions for Hope Sports Complex
Midwest	Midwest Central	FC 1974 Libertyville	Libertyville, Illinois	Libertyville Township Soccer Complex
Midwest	Midwest Central	Force Football Club	Crystal Lake, Illinois	The MAC Sports Center
Midwest	Midwest Central	KS Wisloka Chicago	Chicago, Illinois	Redmond Park
Midwest	Midwest Central	Round Lake Evolution FC	Round Lake, Illinois	Round Lake High School
Midwest	Midwest Central	TBD FC	Madison, Wisconsin	Bank of Sun Prairie Stadium
Midwest	Midwest Central	Urbana City FC	Urbana, Illinois	Judah Field of Dreams
Midwest	Midwest East			
Midwest	Midwest East	Detroit Arsenal	Rochester, Michigan	Evolution Sportsplex
Midwest	Midwest East	Detroit City FC II	Detroit, Michigan	Titan Field
Midwest	Midwest East	Detroit Metro FC	Brighton, Michigan	Legacy Center Sports Complex
Midwest	Midwest East	Detroit United	Detroit, Michigan	The Hawk
Midwest	Midwest East	Drita SC	Rochester Hills, Michigan	St. Paul Roman Catholic Church
Midwest	Midwest East	Metro Detroit Wheels FC	Macomb, Michigan	Fraser High School
Midwest	Midwest East	Pinnacle FC	Auburn Hills, Michigan	Oakland University Dome
Midwest	Midwest East	Victory Soccer	Livonia, Michigan	Schoolcraft College
Midwest	Midwest South			
Midwest	Midwest South	Al Madinah Wichita FC	Wichita, Kansas	Scheel's Stryker Sports Complex Stadium
Midwest	Midwest South	Athletic Wichita	Wichita, Kansas	Scheel's Stryker Sports Complex Stadium
Midwest	Midwest South	Central Kansas United	Salina, Kansas	JRI Stadium
Midwest	Midwest South	Chivas Kansas	Lenexa, Kansas	Paragon Star Sports Complex
Midwest	Midwest South	Dodge City Toros FC	Dodge City, Kansas	Memorial Stadium
Midwest	Midwest South	Emporia FC	Emporia, Kansas	Welch Stadium
Midwest	Midwest South	Fountain City Athletic	Kansas City, Kansas	St. Puis X High School
Midwest	Midwest South	Kansas City Legends	Kansas City, Kansas	Paragon Star Sports Complex
Midwest	Midwest South	Ryogoku Soccer Academy	Kansas City, Missouri	9th and Van Braunt Athletics Field
Midwest	Midwest South	Sporting Wichita SC	Wichita, Kansas	Scheel's Stryker Sports Complex Stadium
Midwest	Midwest West			
Midwest	Midwest West	1826 Academy	Minneapolis, Minnesota	Polar Stadium
Midwest	Midwest West	Granite City FC	St. Cloud, Minnesota	Tiger Stadium
Midwest	Midwest West	Karen Football Association	St. Paul, Minnesota	North End Community Center
Midwest	Midwest West	Manitou FC	White Bear Lake, Minnesota	White Bear Lake Area High School-North Campus
Midwest	Midwest West	Minnesota Twinstars FC	Brooklyn Park, Minnesota	Pride Stadium
Midwest	Midwest West	Rochester FC	Rochester, Minnesota	RCTC Stadium
Midwest	Midwest West	St. Croix SC	Stillwater, Minnesota	Lions Stadium
Midwest	Midwest West	St. Paul Blackhawks	St. Paul, Minnesota	Sanneh Field
Midwest	Midwest West	Superior City FC	Superior, Wisconsin	SCCU Stadium
Midwest	Midwest West	Union Des Bateaux FC	Eau Claire, Wisconsin	Sanneh Field
Midwest	Midwest West	Vlora FC	Burnsville, Minnesota	Macalester Stadium
Midwest	NE-SD-IA			
Midwest	NE-SD-IA	Bana Mboka FC	Omaha, Nebraska	Norris Middle School
Midwest	NE-SD-IA	CB Captains FC	Council Bluffs, Iowa	Gale Wickersham Athletic Complex
Midwest	NE-SD-IA	Capital City Roots FC	Des Moines, Iowa	James Cowine Soccer Complex
Midwest	NE-SD-IA	Club Atletico Omaha	Bennington, Nebraska	Omaha Westview High School
Midwest	NE-SD-IA	Garwo United FC	Sioux Falls, South Dakota	USF Soccer Field
Midwest	NE-SD-IA	Heartland United FC	Bellevue, Nebraska	Bruin Soccer Field
Midwest	NE-SD-IA	Omaha Street FC	Omaha, Nebraska	Collin Stadium
Midwest	NE-SD-IA	Reapers FC	Lincoln, Nebraska	LSF Campus
Midwest	NE-SD-IA	Sioux Falls Thunder FC	Sioux Falls, South Dakota	USF Soccer Field
Midwest	NE-SD-IA	Super Stars FC	Omaha, Nebraska	Collin Stadium
Midwest	NE-SD-IA	Worthington Community FC	Worthington, Minnesota	Trojan Field
Midwest	Ohio/Indy			
Midwest	Ohio/Indy	Cincy Nation FC	Cincinnati, Ohio	CHCA Lindner Athletic Fields
Midwest	Ohio/Indy	Columbus Astray	Columbus, Ohio	Washington Christian Upper School
Midwest	Ohio/Indy	Columbus Crew Academy	Columbus, Ohio	OhioHealth Performance Center
Midwest	Ohio/Indy	Columbus Rough Riders FC	Columbus, Ohio	Kilbourne Run Sports Park
Midwest	Ohio/Indy	Fut Ohio SC	Columbus, Ohio	Kilbourne Run Sports Park; Marion Harding Stadium
Midwest	Ohio/Indy	IFC Dayton	Dayton, Ohio	Stuart Field
Midwest	Ohio/Indy	Indy Gladiators SC	Indianapolis, Indiana	Tom Wood Toyota Field
Midwest	Ohio/Indy	Lions FC	Columbus, Ohio	Panther Stadium
Midwest	Ohio/Indy	Manu Ledesma Academy	Cincinnati, Ohio	Riverside Park
Midwest	Ohio/Indy	Southern Indiana Guardians FC	New Albany, Indiana	Woehrle Athletic Complex
West
West	Mountain West			
West	Mountain West	Boise Timbers	Boise, Idaho	Eastside Timbers Sports Complex
West	Mountain West	Provo Utah FC	Provo, Utah	Epic Sports Park; Bulldog Stadium
West	Mountain West	River Mountain FC	West Jordan, Utah	Wardle Fields Regional Park
West	Mountain West	Unión Latina FC	Provo, Utah	TBA
West	Mountain West	Utah Athletic	Provo, Utah	Murray Park; Lakeside Sports Complex
West	Mountain West	Utah Rangers FC	Ogden, Utah	Spence Eccles Ogden Community Sports Complex
West	Mountain West	Viva CV	Logan, Utah	Hansen Family Sports Complex
West	Mountain West	Yuta Kickers FC	Provo, Utah	Lakeside Sports Complex
West	NorCal			
West	NorCal	Acoreano Sport	Hilmar, California	Holy Field
West	NorCal	Capitol City FC	Sacramento, California	Mather Sports Complex
West	NorCal	Central Valley Premier FC	Visalia, California	Riverway Sports Park
West	NorCal	East County Revolution FC	Brentwood, California	Sunset Park
West	NorCal	FC Bandera	Sacramento, California	Placer Valley Sports Complex
West	NorCal	Reno FC	Reno, Nevada	Damonte Ranch High School
West	NorCal	San Juan SC	Sacramento, California	San Juan SC Fields
West	NorCal	San Leandro United	San Leandro, California	
West	NorCal	Sonoma Valley United FC	Sonoma, California	Arnold Field Stadium
West	NorCal	Valley 559 FC	Fresno, California	Keith Tice Park
West	Pacific Northwest - Oregon			
West	Pacific Northwest - Oregon	BFC Lightning	Vancouver, Washington	Columbia River High School
West	Pacific Northwest - Oregon	Cascadia United	Hillsboro, Oregon	La Salle High School
West	Pacific Northwest - Oregon	Deportivo Rose City	Portland, Oregon	Eastside Timbers Sports Complex
West	Pacific Northwest - Oregon	Forest Grove SC	Forest Grove, Oregon	Hanson Stadium
West	Pacific Northwest - Oregon	Inter PDX FC	Wilsonville, Oregon	Tualatin High School
West	Pacific Northwest - Oregon	Salem Panthers FC	Salem, Oregon	Corban University
West	Pacific Northwest - Oregon	Valle Verde FC	Springfield, Oregon	Les Schwab Sports Park
West	Pacific Northwest - Oregon	Vancouver Colima FC	Vancouver, Washington	Harmony Sports Complex
West	Pacific Northwest - Oregon	Vancouver Victory	Vancouver, Washington	Harmony Sports Complex
West	Pacific Northwest - Oregon	Westside Metros FC	Tigard, Oregon	Westside Christian High School
West	Pacific Northwest - Washington			
West	Pacific Northwest - Washington	3 Cities FC	Pasco, Washington	Tri-Cities Soccer Association Complex
West	Pacific Northwest - Washington	Bellevue Athletic	Bellevue, Washington	Bellevue College Soccer Field
West	Pacific Northwest - Washington	Gala FC	Everett, Washington	Tambark Creek Soccer Park
West	Pacific Northwest - Washington	SeaGam FC	Kent, Washington	Kamiak High School
West	Pacific Northwest - Washington	Seattle Eagles FC	Seattle, Washington	Foster High School
West	Pacific Northwest - Washington	Snohomish Sky	Shoreline, Washington	Snohomish High School
West	Pacific Northwest - Washington	Snohomish United	Snohomish, Washington	Stocker Field
West	Pacific Northwest - Washington	Thurston County SA	Olympia, Washington	Salish Middle School
West	Pacific Northwest - Washington	Tri-Cities Badgers FC	Pasco, Washington	Championship Field at Lawrence Scott Park
West	Pacific Northwest - Washington	United Sports FC	Bellevue, Washington	Marymoor Park
West	SoCal Central Coast			
West	SoCal Central Coast	Academia de Fútbol Miguel Ponce	Indio, California	
West	SoCal Central Coast	ASC Antelope Valley	Palmdale, California	Palamade Aerospace Academy
West	SoCal Central Coast	AV ALTA FC Academy	Palmdale, California	Lancaster Municipal Stadium
West	SoCal Central Coast	Costeños	Oxnard, California	
West	SoCal Central Coast	Deportivo Olimpico	Guadalupe, California	Dave Boyd Field
West	SoCal Central Coast	FC Scorpions	Lynwood, California	
West	SoCal Central Coast	Inland Empire FC	San Bernardino, California	Pacific High School
West	SoCal Central Coast	L.A. Wolves FC	Los Angeles, California	
West	SoCal Central Coast	Sporting FC	Westlake Village, California	
West	SoCal North			
West	SoCal North	88Thirty	Orange County, California	Lake Forest Sports Park
West	SoCal North	Apple Valley Storm	Apple Valley, California	Brewster Park
West	SoCal North	AYSD D1 Academy Premier North	Irvine, California	Lake Forest Sports Park
West	SoCal North	Laguna United FC	Laguna Niguel, California	La Paz Sports Park
West	SoCal North	Long Beach FC	Long Beach, California	St. Anthony High School
West	SoCal North	Montclair Academy FC	Montclair, California	
West	SoCal North	Ocelot Academy	San Bernardino, California	Indian Springs High School
West	SoCal North	San Fernando Valley FC	San Fernando Valley, California	Sepulveda Basin Sports Complex
West	SoCal North	Santa Ana Winds FC	Santa Ana, California	Lake Forest Sports Park
West	SoCal North	SoCal United	Tustin, California	Lake Forest Sports Park
West	SoCal South			
West	SoCal South	City SC San Diego	Carlsbad, California	Aviara Park
West	SoCal South	East Lake Soccer FC	Chula Vista, California	
West	SoCal South	Fullerton Disciples FC	Fullerton, California	Lake Forest Sports Park
West	SoCal South	Irvine FC	Irvine, California	Lake Forest Sports Park
West	SoCal South	Nomads SC	San Diego, California	Mira Mesa High School
West	SoCal South	Playmaker FC	Orange County, California	Lake Forest Sports Park
West	SoCal South	San Diego Internacional FC	San Diego, California	Mission Bay High School
West	SoCal South	South Coast FC	Irvine, California	Championship Soccer Stadium
West	SoCal South	Temecula FC	Temecula, California	Chaparral High School
Southwest
Southwest	Arizona			
Southwest	Arizona	Arizona Arsenal SC	Mesa, Arizona	Arizona Athletic Grounds
Southwest	Arizona	Barca Residency Academy USA	Gila Bend, Arizona	Grande Sports World
Southwest	Arizona	Kings FC	Scottsdale, Arizona	Glendale High School
Southwest	Arizona	Next Level Soccer	Gilbert, Arizona	Paloma Soccer Complex
Southwest	Arizona	RSL Arizona	Scottsdale, Arizona	Reach 11 Sports Complex
Southwest	Arizona	State 48 Sporting FC	El Mirage, Arizona	Glendale Heroes Park
Southwest	OK-AR			
Southwest	OK-AR	Arkansas FC - Benton	Benton, Arkansas	
Southwest	OK-AR	Arkansas Wolves 2	Alexander, Arkansas	
Southwest	OK-AR	Benton AFC	Benton, Arkansas	
Southwest	OK-AR	FC Bartlesvilles Buffaloes	Bartlesville, Oklahoma	
Southwest	OK-AR	Hot Springs Wolves	Hot Springs, Arkansas	
Southwest	Texas Central-Austin			
Southwest	Texas Central-Austin	ATX Blues	Austin, Texas	
Southwest	Texas Central-Austin	Kingdom FC	Killeen, Texas	
Southwest	Texas Central-Austin	LTFC	Lake Travis, Texas	
Southwest	Texas Central-Austin	Legends FC by JS	Austin, Texas	
Southwest	Texas Central-Austin	Saint Stephen's Soccer Academy	Austin, Texas	
Southwest	Texas Central-Austin	Stellar FC	Lake Travis, Texas	
Southwest	Texas Central-San Antonio			
Southwest	Texas Central-San Antonio	210 FC	San Antonio, Texas	
Southwest	Texas Central-San Antonio	Alpha Futbol USA	San Antonio, Texas	
Southwest	Texas Central-San Antonio	Arsenal FC	San Antonio, Texas	
Southwest	Texas Central-San Antonio	FC Brownsville	Brownsville, Texas	
Southwest	Texas Central-San Antonio	Laredo Heat SC U23	Laredo, Texas	
Southwest	Texas Central-San Antonio	SA Athletic FC Wolves	San Antonio, Texas	
Southwest	Texas Central-San Antonio	San Antonio City	San Antonio, Texas	
Southwest	Texas Central-San Antonio	San Antonio FC Academy	San Antonio, Texas	
Southwest	Texas Central-San Antonio	The Dreams FC	San Antonio, Texas	
Southwest	Texas North			
Southwest	Texas North	Atletico Dallas II	Dallas, Texas	MoneyGram Soccer Park
Southwest	Texas North	Coppell FC	Coppell, Texas	
Southwest	Texas North	DFW Falcons	Irving, Texas	
Southwest	Texas North	DKSC Pro	Dallas, Texas	
Southwest	Texas North	Dallas Deportivo FC	Dallas, Texas	
Southwest	Texas North	Dallas Golden Eagles	Dallas, Texas	
Southwest	Texas North	Dallas Hornets	Allen, Texas	
Southwest	Texas North	FC Dallas Academy	Frisco, Texas	
Southwest	Texas North	FC Fort Worth	Fort Worth, Texas	
Southwest	Texas North	FC Hurst United	Hurst, Texas	
Southwest	Texas North	Foro Soccer Club	Dallas, Texas	Foro Soccer Club
Southwest	Texas North	NTX Legends FC	Denton, Texas	
Southwest	Texas North	Rayados Irving FC	Irving, Texas	
Southwest	Texas North	Resolute Soccer	Celina, Texas	
Southwest	Texas North	Sporting NTX	Allen, Texas	
Southwest	Texas North	TAG Soccer	Fairview, Texas	
Southwest	Texas North	TXS Elite	Carrollton, Texas	
Southwest	Texas North	Tenfifteen FC	Dallas, Texas	
Southwest	Texas North	Texas Spurs	Allen, Texas	
Southwest	Texas North	VV FC	Carrollton, Texas	
Southwest	Texas North	Villareal North Texas	Fort Worth, Texas	
Southwest	Texas South			
Southwest	Texas South	Aspire FC Lions	Houston, Texas	
Southwest	Texas South	GFI Academy	Houston, Texas	
Southwest	Texas South	Houston Dutch Lions FC	Conroe, Texas	
Southwest	Texas South	Houston FC	Houston, Texas	Westbury Christian School Athletic Complex
Southwest	Texas South	Katy Jaguars FC	Katy, Texas	
Southwest	Texas South	Lightning Elite FC	Houston, Texas	
Southwest	Texas South	Matias Almeyda FC	Houston, Texas	
Southwest	Texas South	SVD Beaumont	Beaumont, Texas	
Southwest	Texas South	Texas Hawks FC	Houston, Texas	
Southwest	West Texas - New Mexico			
Southwest	West Texas - New Mexico	El Paso Surf	El Paso, Texas	
Southwest	West Texas - New Mexico	New Mexico FC	Albuquerque, New Mexico	
Southwest	West Texas - New Mexico	Rio United	El Paso, Texas	
Southwest	West Texas - New Mexico	Sun City FC	El Paso, Texas	Julius & Irene Lowenberg Stadium
Southwest	West Texas - New Mexico	UDA Soccer NMSU	Las Cruces, New Mexico	
Southwest	West Texas - New Mexico	West Texas Rush	El Paso, Texas	Andress High School

=== Division 1 ===
Division	Team	City/area
American North
American North	AFC Academy	Long Island, New York
American North	Atlantic United FC	Centereach, New York
American North	Atlas FC NYC	Long Island, New York
American North	CD Iberia	Astoria, New York
American North	Kelmendi FC NY	New Rochelle, New York
American North	Leone Stars of New York	Staten Island, New York
American North	New York Braveheart SC U23	New Hyde Park, New York
American North	NY Crush SC	Suffern, New York
American North	NY Dash FC	College Point, New York
American North	Osners FC II	Brooklyn, New York
American North	Real New York FC	Queens, New York
American South
American South	Atletico Lehigh SC	Allentown, Pennsylvania
American South	FSA	Morristown, New Jersey
American South	Holger SC	Quakertown, Pennsylvania
American South	Junior Mafia FC	Newark, New Jersey
American South	New Jersey Alliance FC II	Clifton, New Jersey
American South	NJ Santos FC Rush	Bridgewater Township, New Jersey
American South	NJ Wonders FC	Elizabeth, New Jersey
American South	Parsippany Blues FC	Parsippany, New Jersey
American South	Pennsylvania Prime FC II	Allentown, Pennsylvania
American South	Princeton International FC	Princeton, New Jersey
American South	Scots-Americans AC	Kearny, New Jersey
American South	Titanium FC	Scranton, Pennsylvania
Arizona North
Arizona North	Cochise United	Sierra Vista, Arizona
Arizona North	Next Level Soccer II	Gilbert, Arizona
Arizona North	Real Altura FC	Phoenix, Arizona
Arizona North	Spartans FC Academy	Vail, Arizona
Arizona North	Tucson Sur SC	Tucson, Arizona
Arizona North	White Lions FC	Tucson, Arizona
Arizona South
Arizona South	GCU Club Soccer	Phoenix, Arizona
Arizona South	Kings FC II	Scottsdale, Arizona
Arizona South	Next Level Soccer Academy	Mesa, Arizona
Arizona South	OJB FC	Prescott, Arizona
Arizona South	PHX Heat FC	Surprise, Arizona
Arizona South	Yuma City FC	Yuma, Arizona
Florida Central Zone 1
Florida Central Zone 1	Bateria FC	Orlando, Florida
Florida Central Zone 1	Brian and Anthony's FC	Sanford, Florida
Florida Central Zone 1	FC Kanks	Orlando, Florida
Florida Central Zone 1	Four Corners FC	Davenport, Florida
Florida Central Zone 1	Hunter's Creek SC	Orlando, Florida
Florida Central Zone 1	Orlando Rovers FC	Orlando, Florida
Florida Central Zone 1	The Power of Friendship FC	Orlando, Florida
Florida Central Zone 2
Florida Central Zone 2	Athletic Orlando	Orlando, Florida
Florida Central Zone 2	Emerald FC II	Orlando, Florida
Florida Central Zone 2	Golden Goal Soccer Academy	Ocoee, Florida
Florida Central Zone 2	GOSA Academy YF	Orlando, Florida
Florida Central Zone 2	Kissimmee SC II	Kissimmee, Florida
Florida Central Zone 2	Montverde Academy II	Montverde, Florida
Florida Central Zone 2	OFC Barca II	Orlando, Florida
Florida South - North
Florida South - North	ASA Primera	Sunrise, Florida
Florida South - North	Empire SC La Cantera	Weston, Florida
Florida South - North	Impact City FC	Palm Beach Gardens, Florida
Florida South - North	Mako Soccer Club	Port St. Lucie, Florida
Florida South - North	Oshea's FC	West Palm Beach, Florida
Florida South - North	Parkland SC II	Parkland, Florida
Florida South - North	PSL Hurricanes FC	Port St. Lucie, Florida
Florida South - North	Weston FC	Weston, Florida
Florida South - South
Florida South - South	Boca Jr. Miami FC	Margate, Florida
Florida South - South	Cyclones FC II	Pembroke Pines, Florida
Florida South - South	Dade County FC	Miami, Florida
Florida South - South	Florida FC	Miami Gardens, Florida
Florida South - South	Florida Soccer Soldiers II	Miramar, Florida
Florida South - South	Hodler Miami FC	Doral, Florida
Florida South - South	Hollywood FC	Hollywood, Florida
Florida South - South	Florida Island United	Miami, Florida
Florida South - South	Miami FC U19	Doral, Florida
Florida South - South	Plantation FC II	Plantation, Florida
Florida South - South	River Miami FC	Hollywood, Florida
Florida South - South	Strikers Miami FC	Doral, Florida
Florida South - South	United Stars Academy	Miami, Florida
Florida North
Florida North	Bold City SC II	Jacksonville, Florida
Florida North	Bronson SC	Bronson, Florida
Florida North	Coastal Kicks	Atlantic Beach, Florida
Florida North	First Coast Athletic	Jacksonville, Florida
Florida North	Inter-United SC	Palm Coast, Florida
Florida West - North
Florida West - North	Benfica Residential Academy II	St. Leo, Florida
Florida West - North	Lakeland United FC II	Lakeland, Florida
Florida West - North	Lase Lions	Apollo Beach, Florida
Florida West - North	Players Club Tampa Bay	Brandon, Florida
Florida West - North	Polk United FC	Winter Haven, Florida
Florida West - North	St. Petersburg FC	St. Petersburg, Florida
Florida West - North	Tampa Bay Mutiny	Tampa, Florida
Florida West - North	Tampa Bay Tide FC	Brandon, Florida
Florida West - North	Water Street FC	Tampa, Florida
Florida West - South
Florida West - South	Estates FC	Naples, Florida
Florida West - South	Galacticos Soccer Academy	Naples, Florida
Florida West - South	IMG Academy	Bradenton, Florida
Florida West - South	Naples United FC	Naples, Florida
Florida West - South	Southwest Florida Premier	Lakewood Ranch, Florida
Florida West - South	Sporting Impalas	Naples, Florida
Florida West - South	SWFL SC II	Babcock Ranch, Florida
Florida West - South	Twin Rivers United	Charlotte County, Florida
Florida West - South	Upper 90 FC	Sarasota, Florida
Georgia North
Georgia North	Club The Strongest Atlanta	Gwinnett County, Georgia
Georgia North	Futuro FC	Gwinnett County, Georgia
Georgia North	Lithonia City FC	Lithonia, Georgia
Georgia North	Mableton FC	Mableton, Georgia
Georgia North	NG Kaistorms FC	Chattanooga, Tennessee
Georgia North	Piedmont Soccer Academy	Winder, Georgia
Georgia South
Georgia South	AFA Academy	Atlanta, Georgia
Georgia South	Georgia Revolution FC U19	McDonough, Georgia
Georgia South	LAX FC U20	Columbus, Georgia
Georgia South	Montgomery United FC	Montgomery, Alabama
Georgia South	Swarm FC	Marietta, Georgia
Georgia South	TCSA	Macon, Georgia
KY - TN
KY - TN	Ash Gold FC II	Mt. Juliet, Tennessee
KY - TN	Cleveland United FC II	Cleveland, Tennessee
KY - TN	Dalton United	Dalton, Georgia
KY - TN	Morazan ZLA FC II	Nashville, Tennessee
KY - TN	Sporting Soccer Academy II	Johnson City, Tennessee
KY - TN	Tango FC	Athens, Tennessee
KY - TN	Tennessee Tempo FC II	Nashville, Tennessee
Mid-Atlantic North
Mid-Atlantic North	Briar United Castle FC	Raleigh, North Carolina
Mid-Atlantic North	Briar United FC Academy	Raleigh, North Carolina
Mid-Atlantic North	Combine Academy II	Lincolnton, North Carolina
Mid-Atlantic North	Emory FC II	Emory, Virginia
Mid-Atlantic North	FC Roanoke	Roanoke Rapids, North Carolina
Mid-Atlantic North	Greensboro FC	Greensboro, North Carolina
Mid-Atlantic North	Liberty Arsenal International SCA	Fayetteville, North Carolina
Mid-Atlantic North	NC United	Concord, North Carolina
Mid-Atlantic North	Rush United FC II	Radford, Virginia
Mid-Atlantic South
Mid-Atlantic South	Augusta Soccer Team	Augusta, Georgia
Mid-Atlantic South	Charlotte Soccer Academy II	Charlotte, North Carolina
Mid-Atlantic South	KOSA FC	Myrtle Beach, South Carolina
Mid-Atlantic South	Mint Hill FC II	Mint Hill, North Carolina
Mid-Atlantic South	River City FC	Columbia, South Carolina
Mid-Atlantic South	Soda City FC	Columbia, South Carolina
Midwest Central
Midwest Central	Assur City FC	Niles, Illinois
Midwest Central	Chelsea Adolphus FC	Waukegan, Illinois
Midwest Central	Diverse City FC U23	Schaumburg, Illinois
Midwest Central	United North FC	South Bend, Indiana
Midwest Central	Wheaton Wanderers FC	Wheaton, Illinois
Mountain West
Mountain West	Bowaze FC	Boise, Idaho
Mountain West	Future FC	Salt Lake City, Utah
Mountain West	SEI Corvids FC	Pocatello, Idaho
Mountain West	Utah Athletic II	Salt Lake City, Utah
Mountain West	Utah Real FC	Roy, Utah
Mountain West	Utah Real FC II	Roy, Utah
Mountain West	Valor SC	Logan, Utah
New England
New England	Boston Siege FC	Boston, Massachusetts
New England	Boston Street FC II	Boston, Massachusetts
New England	Capital City FC	Augusta, Maine
New England	Dorchester City FC	Dorchester, Massachusetts
New England	Maine Legends FC	Lewiston, Maine
New England	Maine Soccer Development	Portland, Maine
New England	New England Combine FC	Worcester, Massachusetts
New England	Somerville United FC	Somerville, Massachusetts
New England	Unations FC	Worcester, Massachusetts
New England	Washed Prospects FC	Exeter, New Hampshire
NorCal North
NorCal North	Hughson United	Hughson, California
NorCal North	Junction 29	American Canyon, California
NorCal North	Placer United SC	Rocklin, California
NorCal North	San Ramon FC	San Ramon, California
NorCal North	Superior Sports FC	Roseville, California
NorCal South
NorCal South	Ballistic United SC	Pleasanton, California
NorCal South	CV United	Dublin, California
NorCal South	Eclipse SA	Santa Cruz, California
NorCal South	Jasa RWC	Redwood City, California
NorCal South	OV Toros FC	Morgan Hill, California
SoCal East
SoCal East	ASC Antelope Valley II	Palmdale, California
SoCal East	Flash FC II	Tustin, California
SoCal East	Gauchos Intercontinental	San Bernardino, California
SoCal East	Independent FC	Norco, California
SoCal East	Internacionales CVSL	Indio, California
SoCal East	Montclair Academy FC II	Carson, California
SoCal East	Ocelot Academy III	San Bernardino, California
SoCal East	Sporting Fontana	Fontana, California
SoCal East	Titans FC	Highland, California
SoCal North
SoCal North	A.S. Los Angeles	Tujunga, California
SoCal North	AF Central Los Angeles	Moreno Valley, California
SoCal North	OC Sporting FC White	Mission Viejo, California
SoCal North	Pasadena Cali SC	Pasadena, California
SoCal North	Pateadores Santa Clarita	Santa Clarita, California
SoCal North	San Fernando Valley FC II	San Fernando, California
SoCal North	South Bay Strikers	Torrance, California
SoCal North	Southern California FC	Los Angeles, California
SoCal South
SoCal South	Autobahn SC	Santa Monica, California
SoCal South	FC Rockers	Irvine, California
SoCal South	IKON Soccer	Irvine, California
SoCal South	Irvine FC II	Irvine, California
SoCal South	Leopardos Naranjas FC	Orange, California
SoCal South	OC Sporting FC Blue	Irvine, California
SoCal South	Ocelot Academy II	San Bernardino, California
SoCal South	Olympiacos CA	Guadalupe, California
SoCal South	Pateadores OC	Orange, California
Ohio
Ohio	Columbus Astray II	Columbus, Ohio
Ohio	Kettering FC	Dayton, Ohio
Ohio	Lexington FC	Lexington, Kentucky
Ohio	Lions FC II	Columbus, Ohio
Ohio	Manu Ledesma Academy II	Cincinnati, Ohio
Ohio	Mercury Soccer	Cincinnati, Ohio
Ohio	Ohio Elite FC	Columbus, Ohio
Ohio	Spire Academy	Geneva, Ohio
Texas Central - Austin
Texas Central - Austin	ATX Blues II	Austin, Texas
Texas Central - Austin	Bell County FC	Belton, Texas
Texas Central - Austin	Centex Storm SC	Temple, Texas
Texas Central - Austin	Mixtum United	Killeen, Texas
Texas Central - Austin	Stellar FC II	Lakeway, Texas
Texas Central - San Antonio
Texas Central - San Antonio	Alpha Futbol USA II	San Antonio, Texas
Texas Central - San Antonio	Forza Laredos	Laredo, Texas
Texas Central - San Antonio	HCYSA Tejanos	Kerrville, Texas
Texas Central - San Antonio	Quickplay FC	San Antonio, Texas
Texas Central - San Antonio	SA Athletic FC Wolves II	San Antonio, Texas
Texas Central - San Antonio	San Antonio FC Academy RL Black	San Antonio, Texas
Texas Central - San Antonio	San Antonio FC Academy RL Red	San Antonio, Texas
Texas North Blue
Texas North Blue	Allegiance Academy	Euless, Texas
Texas North Blue	Cosmos FC	Fort Worth, Texas
Texas North Blue	DKSC Pro II	Dallas, Texas
Texas North Blue	Henderson Cavalry FC	Athens, Texas
Texas North Blue	Ice FC/Black Ice	Dallas, Texas
Texas North Blue	Inter Fort Worth FC	Fort Worth, Texas
Texas North Blue	Midcities FC	Euless, Texas
Texas North Red
Texas North Red	Denton Diablos Estudiantes	Denton, Texas
Texas North Red	Diversity FC	Frisco, Texas
Texas North Red	FC Allen	Allen, Texas
Texas North Red	NTX Lions	Prosper, Texas
Texas North Red	Resolute Soccer II	Celina, Texas
Texas North Red	Texas Spurs FC II	Allen, Texas
Texas North Red	Threat Football Club	Dallas, Texas
Texas South
Texas South	Crossbar Elite FC	Houston, Texas
Texas South	GFI Academy U19	Houston, Texas
Texas South	Houston FC II	Houston, Texas
Texas South	Katy Jaguars FC II	Katy, Texas
Texas South	North Houston FC	Hockley, Texas
Texas South	SVD Beaumont II	Beaumont, Texas
Texas South	Texas International FC	Houston, Texas
Washington
Washington	Bellevue Athletic II	Bellevue, Washington
Washington	Everett FC	Everett, Washington
Washington	Holac FC Academy	Seattle, Washington
Washington	New Northerners FC	Mountlake Terrace, Washington
Washington	Rayados SA - Northwest	Issaquah, Washington
Washington	Sammamish FC	Sammamish, Washington
Washington	SeaGam II	Shoreline, Washington
Washington	Strangers United FC	Bellevue, Washington
Washington	Thurston County SA II	Olympia, Washington
Washington	United Sports FC II	Bellevue, Washington
Western NY
Western NY	NFC II	Auburn, New York
Western NY	Silver City Sharks FC	Sherrill, New York
Western NY	Soaring Capital SC	Elmira, New York
Western NY	Soaring Capital SC II	Elmira, New York
Western NY	Tanganyika FC	Buffalo, New York

=== Division 2 ===
Division 2 will begin play in the fall of 2026.

== Women's Division ==
=== Women ===
Division	Team	City/area
American
American	Central Park Rangers FC	New York, New York
American	NJ Wonders FC	Elizabeth, New Jersey
American	New Jersey Alliance Women	Clifton, New Jersey
American	Philadelphia Lone Star Women	Philadelphia, Pennsylvania
American	TSF Academy	Mine Hill Township, New Jersey
Florida - Central
Florida - Central	Bay City Reign Women	Tampa, Florida
Florida - Central	Clermont FC Women	Clermont, Florida
Florida - Central	Current FC Women	New Smyrna Beach, Florida
Florida - Central	Four Corners FC Women	Davenport, Florida
Florida - Central	Polk United FC Women	Winter Haven, Florida
Florida - Central	Royal Palms SC Women	Palm Coast, Florida
Florida - Central	Shock City FC Women	Clearwater, Florida
Florida - Central	South Tampa FC Women	Tampa, Florida
Florida - Central	Tampa Bay Radiance	Tampa, Florida
Florida - Central	United Soccer Alliance	Fleming Island, Florida
Florida - South
Florida - South	Athena FC	Hialeah, Florida
Florida - South	Fort Lauderdale United FC	Fort Lauderdale, Florida
Florida - South	Miami Grove FC Women	Miami, Florida
Florida - South	Miami Grove FC Women Reserve	Miami, Florida
Florida - South	Naples Captains SC Womens	Naples, Florida
Florida - South	Naples United FC	Naples, Florida
Florida - South	River Miami FC Womens	Hollywood, Florida
Mid-Atlantic
Mid-Atlantic	Carolina Crew FC Women	Fayetteville, North Carolina
Mid-Atlantic	Carolina FC Women	Pinehurst, North Carolina
Mid-Atlantic	Royal Cavaliers FC	Edgemoor, South Carolina
Mid-Atlantic	Rush United FC Women	Abingdon, Virginia
Mid-Atlantic	Soda City FC Women	Columbia, South Carolina
Midwest West - North
Midwest West - North	Minnesota Bliss	Plymouth, Minnesota
Midwest West - North	NOSC Blast	Shoreview, Minnesota
Midwest West - North	Superior City FC Women	Superior, Wisconsin
Midwest West - North	Vlora FC Women	Burnsville, Minnesota
Midwest West - South
Midwest West - South	Eden Prairie SC	Eden Prairie, Minnesota
Midwest West - South	Granite City FC Women	St. Cloud, Minnesota
Midwest West - South	Lakeville SC Women	Lakeville, Minnesota
Midwest West - South	St. Croix SC Women	Stillwater, Minnesota
Midwest West - South	St. Paul Blackhawks Women	St. Paul, Minnesota
SoCal
SoCal	9 CITIES FC Women	Coachella, California
SoCal	BSA Pro Women	Bakersfield, California
SoCal	Club Atletico Internacional Women	Lake Forest, California
SoCal	Empire Surf SC Women	Temecula, California
SoCal	FC Premier Women	Long Beach, California
SoCal	FC Scorpions Women	Lynwood, California
SoCal	FC United Women	California
SoCal	Flash FC Women	Orange, California
SoCal	L.A. Wolves FC Women	Los Angeles, California
SoCal	LA Watford Women FC	Studio City, California
SoCal	Montclair Academy FC Womens	Pasadena, California
SoCal	Oxnard Premier FC	Oxnard, California
SoCal	Prestige FC Women	Jurupa Valley, California
SoCal	Southern California FC Women	Los Angeles, California
Texas South
Texas South	Arsenal FC Women	San Antonio, Texas
Texas South	Dallas Select	Dallas, Texas
Texas South	HCYSA Tejanos Women	Kerrville, Texas
Texas South	Lady Dragons	San Antonio, Texas
Texas South	Lady Dragons II	San Antonio, Texas
Texas South	SGA	Austin, Texas
Texas South	Stellar FC Women	Lakeway, Texas
Texas South	Stellar FC Women II	Lakeway, Texas

== Champions ==
Season	Champion	Runner-up	Result
2011–12	OC Crew SC	Santa Ana Winds FC	4–2
2012–13	Santa Ana Winds FC	Tustin Legends	
2013–14	OC Crew SC	Tustin Legends FC	5–3
2014–15	La Máquina FC	Glory United	4–1
2015	San Nicolas FC	L.A. Wolves FC	2–0
2016 Spring	Strikers FC South Coast	San Pedro Monsters	3–1
2016 Fall	FC Anahuac	Inter Arizona FC	0–0 (5–4p)
2017 Spring	L.A. Wolves FC	California Victory FC	2–1
2017 Fall	OC Invicta FC	Santa Ana Winds FC	3–2
2018 Spring	Milwaukee Bavarian SC	Sporting AZ FC	3–2
2018 Fall	California United FC II	Inocentes FC	1–1 (4–2p)
2019 Spring	Tropics SC	Utah Murcielagos	2–2 (4–3p)
2019 Fall	Maryland Bobcats FC	Santa Ana Winds FC	3–1 (OT)
2020 Spring	N/A	N/A	N/A
2020 Fall	Ginga Atlanta	Olympians FC	0–0 (3–1p)
2021 Spring	New York Contour United	East Valley United PRO	2–1
2021 Fall	Foro 360 Pro	Chicago Nation FC	1–0
2022 Spring	Orange County FC	Beaman United	3–1
2022 Fall	Olympians FC	SCU Heat	1–0
2023 Spring	AS Frenzi	Sporting Wichita SC	2–1
2023 Fall	Chiriaco FC	St. Louis City SC Academy	2–1
2024 Spring	Soda City FC	Inland Empire FC	3–2 (OT)
2024 Fall	Soda City FC	FC Folsom	4–2
2025 Spring	Tennessee Tempo FC	LA 10 FC	1–0
2025 Fall	New York Renegades FC	Provo FC	2–0
2026 Spring	Deportivo Rose City	Miami United FC	3–1
