= Leif Hansen =

Leif Hansen may refer to:

- Leif Hansen (businessman) (born 1957), founder and owner of a chain of auto body shops, Leif's Auto Collision Centers
- Leif Hansen (Norwegian boxer) (1928–2004), Norwegian boxer who competed in the 1952 Summer Olympics
- Leif Hansen (Danish boxer) (born 1934), Danish Olympic boxer
- Leif Hansen (footballer)
