= Summer Lynne Seasons =

American drag performer

- Born: Brent Blackwell; 1979 or 1980 (age 45–46)
- Occupation: Drag queen

Summer Lynne Seasons is the stage name of Brent Blackwell, an American drag performer based in the Portland metropolitan area, in Oregon. Summer Lynne Seasons is part of the cast of Darcelle XV Showplace.

Blackwell competed on the reality competition show Buddy Games.

== Education ==
Blackwell graduated from West Linn High School, in West Linn, Oregon.

== Career ==
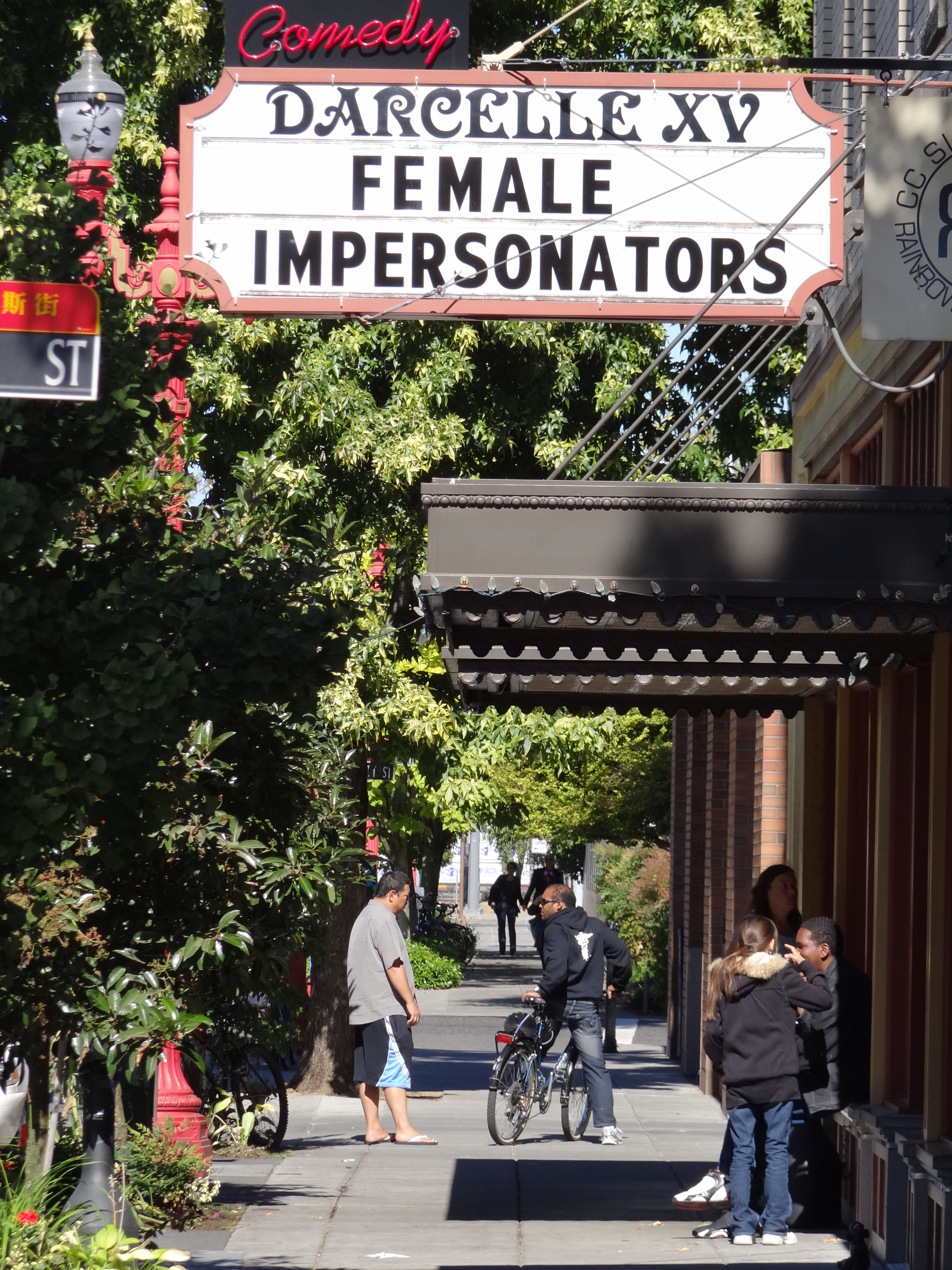
Summer Lynns Seasons is part of the cast of Darcelle XV Showplace (pictured in 2012)

Drag performer Summer Lynne Seasons has been part of the cast at Darcelle XV Showplace. She has also performed with Darcelle XV and Company outside Portland, such as in The Dalles in 2022. In 2020, during the COVID-19 pandemic, she, fellow cast member Bolivia Carmichaels, and other performers offered socially distanced drag performances as part of a fundraiser for the nonprofit organization Our House Portland. In 2023, Summer Lynne Seasons performed in Drag-a-thon, which set a Guinness World Record for the longest drag stage show. She and Bolivia Carmichaels were co-hosts during KOIN's coverage of Portland's annual pride parade in 2024.

In 2023, Blackwell competed on the reality competition show Buddy Games, as part of Team Pride. The team was eliminated on the finale.

Outside of drag, Blackwell manages Esther's Pantry & Tod's Corner for CAP Northwest (formerly Cascade AIDS Project). In 2022, Blackwell was among seven recipients in the Pacific Northwest of the Marie Lamfrom Foundation's annual Grit Award, which recognizes "community members and non-profit leaders who demonstrate grit through their work and service".

== Personal life ==
Blackwell is based in the Portland metropolitan area, and has lived in Tigard, Oregon for approximately two decades. Blackwell is gay and uses the pronouns they/them.

== See also ==
- LGBTQ culture in Portland, Oregon
- List of drag queens
- List of people from Tigard, Oregon
