= Oregon Islamic Academy =

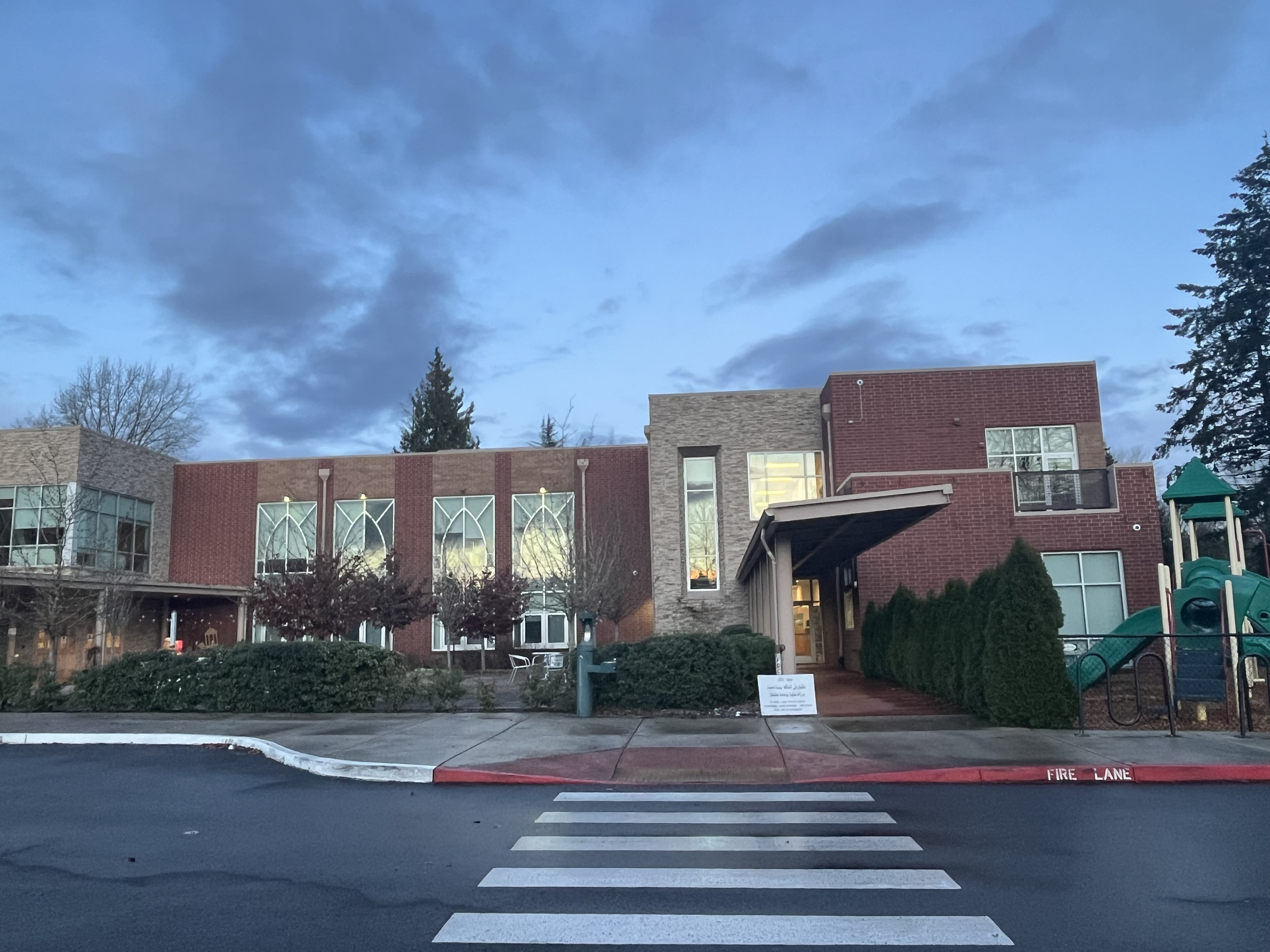
- Oregon Islamic Academy in 2025

Location
- 10330 SW Scholls Ferry Road; Tigard, OR 97223
- Coordinates: 45.4447°N 122.795°W

Information
- School type: Private, high school
- Founded: 1993
- Grades: 9-12
- Language: English
- Campus: Suburban
- Colors: Blue & Green

The Oregon Islamic Academy is an Islamic based, private sixth through twelfth grade school in Tigard, Oregon, United States. It is part of the Muslim Educational Trust (MET) which is divided into a community outreach committee, a pre-kindergarten through fifth grade named the Islamic School of the Muslim Educational Trust (ISMET). The Oregon Islamic Academy (OIA) holds classes for those students in grades six through twelve.

The National Center for Education Statistics, in statistics collection, groups the elementary and secondary schools together.

== History ==
The Muslim Educational Trust was founded in 1993 by Wajdi Said, Gail Ramjan, and Ayoob Ramjan. In 1997, the trust opened an Islamic-based school in Tigard. By 2006 the school had grown to 89 students at its campus near Washington Square, all in pre-kindergarten through eighth grade. The next school year, the school had grown to 125 students, and had 16 teachers.

In September 2007, the Oregon Islamic Academy opened as the high school for the educational group with a class of six students, and was the first Islamic high school to open in the Northwestern United States. A seventh grade student at the school won the poster contest held by the Human Rights Council of Washington County in 2010. Following the March 2011 earthquake and tsunami in Japan, seven students at the academy traveled to Japan to assist in the recovery. The Oregon Islamic Academy graduated its first high school class in June 2011, with two students earning their diplomas.
