= Deportivo Rose City =

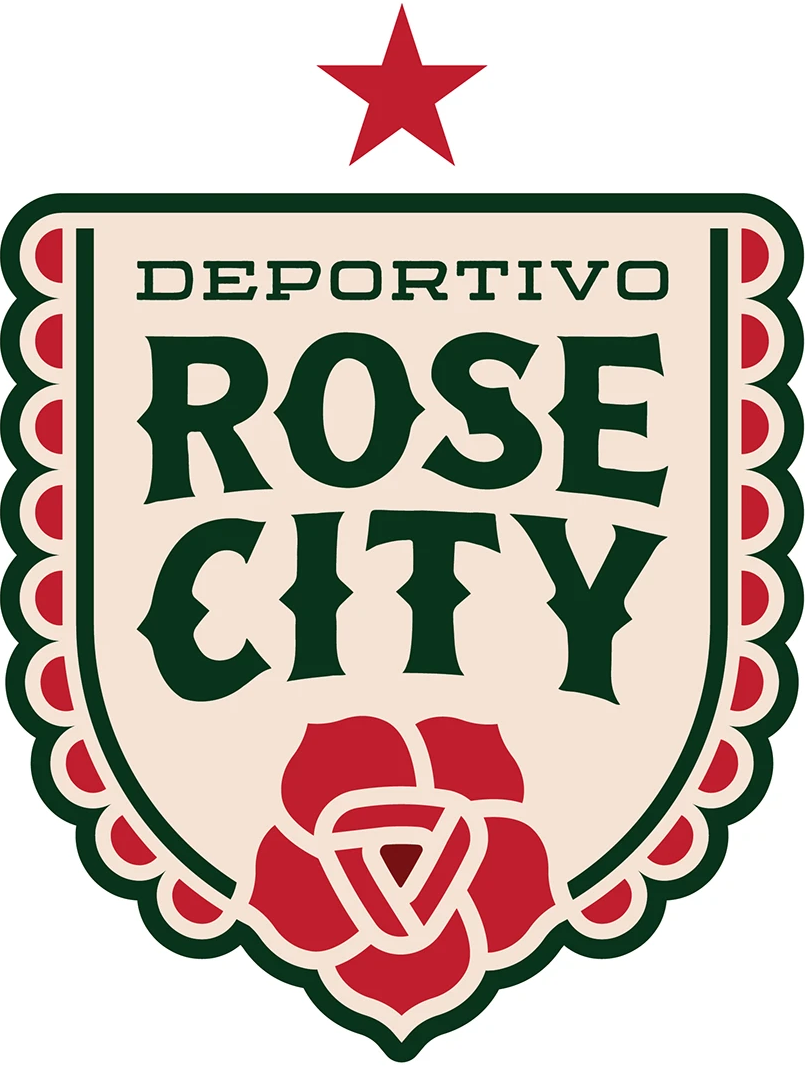
- Full name: Deportivo Rose City
- Nickname: La Rosa
- Short name: DRC
- Founded: 2020
- Ground: Eastside Timbers Sports Complex, Portland, Oregon
- Head coach: Mario Moreno
- League: United Premier Soccer League

Deportivo Rose City is an amateur soccer club based in Portland, Oregon, that plays in the United Premier Soccer League. It was founded in 2020 by Orlando Juarez, Adan Cazárez, Don Migue and Don Larry. The side emerged from a long-running indoor group that transitioned to outdoor play during the COVID-19 pandemic, attracting players as other local teams went inactive. The club first competed in Liga Leon, finishing runners-up in its inaugural autumn season before winning the spring 2021 title. It later entered the United Premier Soccer League after a local organiser encouraged both Rose City and St. John's Soccer Club to step into a higher level of competition.

The squad was assembled informally through personal networks rather than through an academy system, though the club has expressed interest in building youth links in future. Funding has remained limited, with kits and field rentals covered by small local businesses and much of the remaining cost carried by coaches and players. Occasional donations have also been needed to launch UPSL campaigns. Despite these constraints, the side has become one of the more competitive UPSL outfits in Oregon, winning further state titles and progressing into national knockout rounds.

The club has adopted a visual identity that reflects both Portland and the area's Mexican-American community, using rose symbolism and elements of Mexican folk art.

In February 2023, Deportivo Rose City announced that Mario Moreno, previously a director within the academies of CF Pachuca, Santos Laguna and Atlas F.C. in Mexico, would take over as technical director and UPSL head coach for the upcoming season. The move followed the club's strong 2022 campaign, when it scored 37 goals in eight regular season matches and reached the UPSL national quarterfinals before losing to the eventual champions. Moreno described the position as a major responsibility and said his aim was to build the squad carefully and compete for a national title. The club expected him to settle in ahead of the spring season, where Rose City would again attempt a deep playoff run in the UPSL's Pacific Northwest Premier conference.

== See also ==
- Hispanics and Latinos in Portland, Oregon
