= Broadway Rose Theatre Company =

Professional musical theatre company

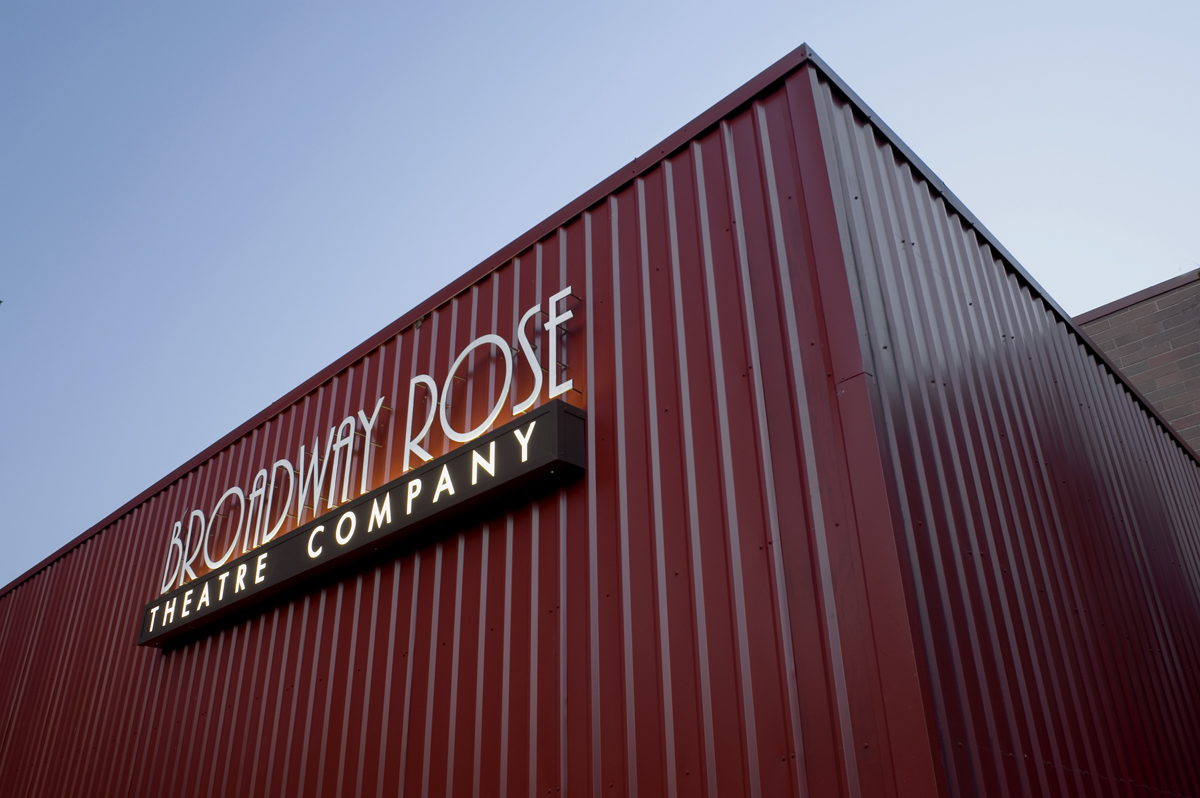
- Formation: 1991
- Type: Professional theatre company
- Legal status: 501(c)(3) nonprofit
- Location: Tigard, OR, US
- Members: National Alliance for Musical Theatre, Portland Area Theatre Alliance, Westside Cultural Alliance, Tigard Chamber of Commerce
- Producing Artistic Director: Sharon Maroney
- Managing Director: Dan Murphy
- Website: www.broadwayrose.org

Broadway Rose Theatre Company is a musical theatre company based in Tigard, Oregon. It presents a variety of mainstage productions throughout the year. The company also organizes summer children's musicals, educational camps for children and teens, and a technical internship program for developing theatre professionals.

Broadway Rose Theatre Company was founded by Sharon Maroney and Dan Murphy in 1991.

== History ==
=== 1990s ===
In 1991, seven years after meeting in the summer stock production of Joseph and the Amazing Technicolor Dreamcoat, in Shamokin Dam, Pennsylvania, Dan Murphy and Sharon Maroney, along with fellow performer Matthew Ryan and his partner Joseph Morkys, decided to move from New York City to start a summer stock theatre in Tigard. The team pooled their savings of $21,000 and, in November 1991, incorporated Broadway Rose Theatre Company as a 501(c)(3). In the summer of 1992, Broadway Rose Theatre Company performed its first season at the Deb Fennell Auditorium at Tigard High School. The company produced five mainstage shows and a children's show in eight weeks, with an average audience of 32 people per performance. The company lost $8,700 in its first season, but the following year, the company received a $3,000 grant from the Metropolitan Arts Commission, a forerunner of the Regional Arts & Culture Council), to help bring the organization out of debt. In 1993, the company produced Oklahoma! with no funds—putting the entire payroll on Murphy's credit card. The situation resolved itself as audiences picked up. In 1994, the company received a $4,000 grant from the Metropolitan Arts Commission. Audiences averaged 132 people per performance that year—a 313 percent increase from 1992. In 1995, The Collins Foundation provided the company with a $5,000 grant, allowing Sharon Maroney to become the company's first paid employee. Platt Electric Supply became Broadway Rose's first title sponsor in 1996, providing a new level of stable funding (they would stay on as a title sponsor through 2012 when Harvey Platt sold the company).

In 1996, co-founders Matthew Ryan and Joe Morkys left Broadway Rose and returned to New York. That year, Broadway Rose held its first drama camp for young performers aged 8–11. Also in 1997, Shoshana Bean, who later portrayed Elphaba in the Broadway musical Wicked, starred in the Broadway Rose production of Bye Bye Birdie. The company's offices moved from Dan and Sharon's home to a Platt Electric Supply branch office in 1999. Later that year, the Sherwood Arts Council contracted Broadway Rose to produce Broadway Goes Hollywood, a fundraiser for SAC held at the historic Robin Hood Theater in Sherwood, OR. As a result, Broadway Rose's annual budget rose to around $175,000, with ticket sales accounting for just under half of the total, and Dan's general manager position officially became funded, making him an employee rather than a volunteer.

=== Early 2000s ===
In 2001, The Meyer Memorial Trust awarded Broadway Rose a $90,000 three-year grant, allowing the company to hire Alan Anderson as the marketing director. Overall attendance increased 33 percent from 2000, and the company presented its first-holiday show at Tualatin High School. In 2002, the company launched a series of annual cabarets—adding play readings in 2004—at Tigard Friends Community Church, filling the 240-seat venue. The two series continued through 2008. In 2005, The National Alliance for Musical Theatre gave Broadway Rose $3,000 to support a developmental production of The Ghosts of Celilo. That same year, volunteers formed the Theatre Guild at Broadway Rose, and it continues to serve the company. In 2006, Broadway Rose approached the Tigard/Tualatin School District with plans to renovate an abandoned building on the C.F. Tigard Elementary School campus and turn it into a theater, and the school board approved it. Fundraising for the renovations began in 2007, and the company signed a twenty-year lease with the Tigard-Tualatin School District. The company received a $50,000 grant from the Paul G. Allen Foundation for the project. The following year Brisa Trinchero became the company's first executive director. In 2008, Broadway Rose was one of 24 companies in the United States selected by Music Theatre International to produce Les Misérables. In December 2008, the new theater and administrative building, designed by Soderstrom Architects and built by Robert Gray Partners, was completed and aptly named The New Stage. The inaugural New Stage performance was Celebrate Home - A Broadway Rose Christmas. In 2009, Oregon Business Magazine included Broadway Rose Theatre Company on its "100 Best Nonprofits to Work for in Oregon" list. Broadway Rose also was selected as the 2009 "Business of the Year" by the Tigard Chamber of Commerce.

=== 2010s ===
In 2010, the company staged The King and I with 55 cast members—its largest cast to date. Brenda MacRoberts was hired as the new executive director, following Brisa Trincheros' departure to develop new musicals and produce on Broadway (where she would go on to win multiple Tony Awards.) Also that year, the Portland Business Journal ranked Broadway Rose 10th on the list of the "Top Arts Nonprofits." In 2011, the company launched its 20th anniversary season with Joseph and the Amazing Technicolor Dreamcoat as a nod to the production that brought the founders together back in the '80s and also led the company's first season. Broadway Rose received a $30,000 grant from the National Endowment for the Arts' Access to Artistic Excellence program to produce Ripper by Duane Nelsen, the company's first-ever fully staged world premiere. For a third consecutive year, Broadway Rose was recognized on the "100 Best Nonprofits to Work for in Oregon" list by Oregon Business Magazine. In 2012, Broadway Rose received their second NEA grant to produce The Drowsy Chaperone. That year the company also showcased The Sound of Music, which received a review from BroadwayWorld.com encouraging audiences to, "... go, and be a part of something big and wonderful that will stay with you for the rest of your life and maybe even past then". In 2013, the company produced the Andrew Lloyd Webber classic Cats with the assistance of a third consecutive NEA grant. The blockbuster show set a new ticket sales record for Broadway Rose and received much praise with one reviewer noting, "This troupe, without exception, nails every beat." Brenda MacRoberts left the organization in early 2015 to move out of state. Following her departure, the board of directors voted to replace the executive director position with a development director, and deShauna Jones was hired for the role. During the 2015 season, the company produced a nearly sold-out six-week run of Grease that broke New Stage ticket sales records. 2016 marked the company's 25th Anniversary Season, and its spring production of Church Basement Ladies sold out 25 of its 26 performances. In March, Dan was selected as Tigard's First Citizen by the Tigard Chamber of Commerce for his "in-depth, long-term volunteer contributions to the Tigard community over the years." In 2017, founders Dan and Sharon performed opposite one another—for only the second time in the company's history—as Herbie and Rose in Gypsy. Later that season, Broadway Rose was named Tualatin Valley's favorite attraction. The company received funding to hire a community engagement coordinator following the culmination of an 18-month authentic community engagement plan. Amaya Santamaria was selected to fill the role which focuses on the company's equity, diversity, and inclusion efforts.

The company's 2018 production of Mamma Mia! broke their previous box office record with over 12,000 tickets sold—surpassing the previous record holder (Cats, 2013) by over 30%.

In 2019, Broadway Rose produced all its shows at the New Stage Tigard location due to construction occurring at its usual summer theater venue – Tigard High School’s Deb Fennell Auditorium. The summer production of Footloose set the record for the largest cast at the New Stage: 28 actors and nine musicians shared the space.

=== 2020s ===
Pandemic (2020-2022):

In March 2020, mandatory closures caused by the COVID-19 pandemic, brought live performances around the country to a halt. The company responded by launching online content, including weekly live-streamed cabaret performances throughout the summer. In October, the company released its first recorded production, Daddy Long Legs, which streamed for three weeks. The production was a critical success and inspired the onstage proposal and surprise wedding of its two actors.

While Broadway Rose was able to produce live-streamed shows, ticket sales were reduced to $99,000 which was a big drop from the projected 1.6 million ticket sales for the year.

Broadway Rose was voted “The First Theatre You Want to Go Back To!” in the Broadway World Regional Theatre Awards, and the company ramped up preparations for the return of audiences at live performances. Streaming productions continued in 2021 with The Story of My Life and The Last Five Years. The final streamed production was the summer production of Analog and Vinyl, which also included in-person, live performances following COVID-19 protocols.

In 2022, the last show that required proof of vaccination was Don’t Hug Me, performed in April of that year. 2022 was also the first year all the productions were performed live, though it was a reduced season of five shows.

Building Expansion:

In 2019, the company officially launched a $3.4 million capital campaign to expand its New Stage facility, adding a new studio space, costume shop, larger scenic shop, and additional administrative offices. Construction was scheduled to begin in April 2020. However, due to the pandemic expansion plans were halted and did not resume until May 5, 2021. On June 20, 2022, Broadway Rose held a ribbon-cutting ceremony for the completed project. The expansion was made possible by its board-designated cash reserve, foundation and corporate grants, and gifts from individuals who shared the company’s vision for the future of its community. Project support was provided by Scott Edwards Architecture LLP, B&B Builders, Shiels / Obletz / Johnsen Project Management.

In 2023, the full season resumed with six mainstage shows and two youth shows. The summer productions returned to the Deb Fennell Auditorium after a five-year hiatus at that location. Sales from 2023 brought in more than $1.5 million, nearly the same revenue as pre-pandemic ticket sales.

In October 2023, Broadway Rose hired a new executive director, Meredith Gordon, who was the first to be in that position in nine years. With 15 years of experience developing community partnerships, raising critical funds, and managing board leadership for mission-driven organizations, Gordon oversees the administrative, financial, and operational aspects of the theatre company, ensuring its smooth functioning and growth.

== Education ==
=== Camps ===
Each summer the company offers two drama camps for young performers aged 8 through 12 years old and one teen summer workshop. Young performers learn about all aspects of theatre and perform in the ensemble of the company's children's musicals, while the teen workshop participants hone existing skills by putting on a fully staged musical production. Need-based scholarships are offered for children and teenagers each year.

=== Technical Internships ===
Broadway Rose offers high-school and college students paid internship opportunities designed to create and facilitate relationships between theatre professionals and students in order to train, encourage, and nurture those seeking careers or desiring to expand their expertise in theatre production. Students can gain experience in lighting design, costume design, set design, and more while working alongside local professionals. Broadway Rose has gone on to hire past interns to work on productions.

=== Local Schools ===
Each school year, 5th Avenue Theatre in Seattle creates an original educational musical that tours throughout the region, performing in school auditoriums and cafeterias. Over 3,500 elementary students in the Tigard/Tualatin School District experience this performance for free because Broadway Rose underwrites the performance expenses.

Broadway Rose also hosts an annual logo contest for children in Kindergarten through 5th grade at a local elementary school in conjunction with the Tigard-Tualatin School District Art Literacy program. Students create artwork inspired by the stories of the company's two summer children's theatre productions and one illustration for each production is selected to appear on the show program. Winners are awarded prizes, free show tickets, and a backstage tour of the theater.

Founding Managing Director Dan Murphy regularly provides theatrical services to local schools. He has directed and choreographed productions for Tualatin High School and has choreographed for Southridge High School in Beaverton. Additionally, he has assisted with productions at Twality Middle School in Tigard.

== Volunteers ==
Broadway Rose is supported by a team of volunteers who aid with fundraising and provide production, administrative, and front-of-house support. In 2024, the organization had over 230 volunteers give over 3,500 hours to the organization.

== Reception & Awards ==
In 2011, The Oregonian stated of Broadway Rose that "this once-small company has evolved into a bankable force in the Portland area's theater scene." The following year, BroadwayWorld.com reflected, "There's just something about this company that keeps you coming back." Broadway Rose Theatre Company and its artists have been generously recognized with awards including several for outstanding productions.

Season	Awarding Body	Award	Winner
2005-2006	Drammy Awards	Production	The Melody Lingers On: The Songs of Irving Berlin
2008-2009	Drammy Awards	Production	Les Misérables
2011-2012	Drammy Awards	Production	Hairspray
	Portland Area Musical Theatre Awards	Outstanding Production	Hairspray
	Portland Area Musical Theatre Awards	Outstanding Original Musical	Ripper
2012-2013	Drammy Awards	Outstanding Musical	The Drowsy Chaperone
	Portland Area Musical Theatre Awards	Outstanding Musical	The Drowsy Chaperone
2014-2015	BroadwayWorld Portland Awards	Best Musical	Thoroughly Modern Millie
2017	Washington County People's Choice Awards	Favorite Attraction in Tualatin Valley	Broadway Rose Theatre Company
	Drammy Awards	Best Production of a Musical	Fly By Night
2018	Drammy Awards	Best Production of a Musical	The Addams Family
2019	Portland Area Musical Theatre Awards	Outstanding Production	Guys and Dolls

Drammy Award Winners; Portland Area Musical Theatre Award Winners, BroadwayWorld Portland Awards, Washington County Visitors Association People's Choice Awards

Note: The Drammys, and the Portland Area Musical Theatre Awards are evaluated and judged according to the traditional theater season, which laps two calendar years over fall, winter and spring. Broadway Rose, having begun as a summer stock theater, fell naturally into using the calendar year as its basis for describing a season, which it retained after adding fall and winter shows. For this reason, a Drammy or PAMTA given in (for example) 2005–2006, could be for a Broadway Rose show from the last half of its 2005 season (fall) or the first half of its 2006 season (spring).

**The Drammys and the PAMTA awards concluded in 2020.
