= 2017 Spring UPSL season =

United Premier Soccer League
- Season: 2017 Spring
- Champions: L.A. Wolves FC

The 2017 Spring United Premier Soccer League season was the 8th season of the UPSL.

== National playoffs ==
The national playoffs were played at Silverlakes Sports Complex in Norco, CA.

Quarterfinals
July 29–Silverlakes Sports Complex
NV Real Zamora FC | 3(5)
WP Strikers FC South Coast (p) | 3(6)
July 29–Silverlakes Sports Complex
CO Colorado Rush | 0
WP L.A. Wolves FC | 6
July 29–Silverlakes Sports Complex
AZ Sporting AZ FC | 0
NW California Victory FC | 4
July 29–Silverlakes Sports Complex
NW Boise FC (p) | 1(5)
WC FC Golden State Force | 1(4)

Semifinals
July 29–Silverlakes Sports Complex
WP Strikers FC South Coast | 0
WP L.A. Wolves FC | 3
July 29–Silverlakes Sports Complex
NW California Victory FC | 2
NW Boise FC | 1

Final
July 30–Silverlakes Sports Complex
WP L.A. Wolves FC | 2
NW California Victory FC | 1
