= Leif Hansen (businessman) =

Leif Christopher Hansen (born 1957) is the founder and owner of a chain of auto body shops, Leif's Auto Collision Centers.

== History ==
Leif Hansen was born in Bellingham, Washington and raised in Oahu, Hawaii. In 1986, he opened a Honolulu body and repair shop called Pristine Coachworks. In 1990, Hansen moved to Portland in order to invest in a new type of auto body shop. In 1991, he opened Olympic Auto, a one-man auto-body company that served about 80 cars per year. By 1999, the company had grown so much that the organization split into two separate entities - Olympic Auto Body and Paint and Leif's Auto Collision Centers. As of 2005, Leif's Auto Collision Centers' flagship shop in Tigard employed 70 people and handled over 4,000 cars a year.

== Political Action ==
In 1994, Hansen went to Oregon Legislature to protect consumers from illegal steering practices, after recognizing that several autobody repair shops were paying kickbacks to insurance companies in exchange for referrals.

In 2005, Hansen founded a consumer-focused political action committee, Oregonians for Safe Auto Repair (OSAR) to push for legislative changes. In June 2007, OSAR was successful in passing Oregon Senate Bill 523-A. On June 20, 2007, Oregon Governor Ted Kulongoski signed the bill with Hansen present, and on January 1. 2008, the Bill officially became Oregon law. The law requires insurance companies to inform consumers that they have the legal right to choose where their vehicle is repaired. Insurance companies must inform consumers of their rights prior to making a recommendation for a repair provider. The law also prevents insurance companies from limiting reimbursement when consumers choose a repair provider without a referral from the insurance company.

== Class Action Law Suits ==
=== Leif's Auto Collision Centers v. Oregon Mutual et al. ===
Hansen's company went to court against Oregon Mutual and Grange Insurance due to antitrust activities in relation to price requirements on repairs. The case was referred by the United States District Court for the District of Oregon to be a part of the nationwide antitrust suit (A&E BODY SHOP INC. et al. v. 21ST CENTURY CENTENNIAL INSURANCE COMPANY et al.) against some of America's largest insurance companies including Progressive, Hartford, and Allstate.

== Community Involvement ==
In 2011, Leif's Autobody and Collision was the primary sponsor for the 20th Annual Susan G. Komen Race for the Cure in Portland, Oregon. Hansen's efforts helped the foundation raise over $2.5 million in just two days
