= Westside Christian High School =

School in Tigard, Oregon, U.S.

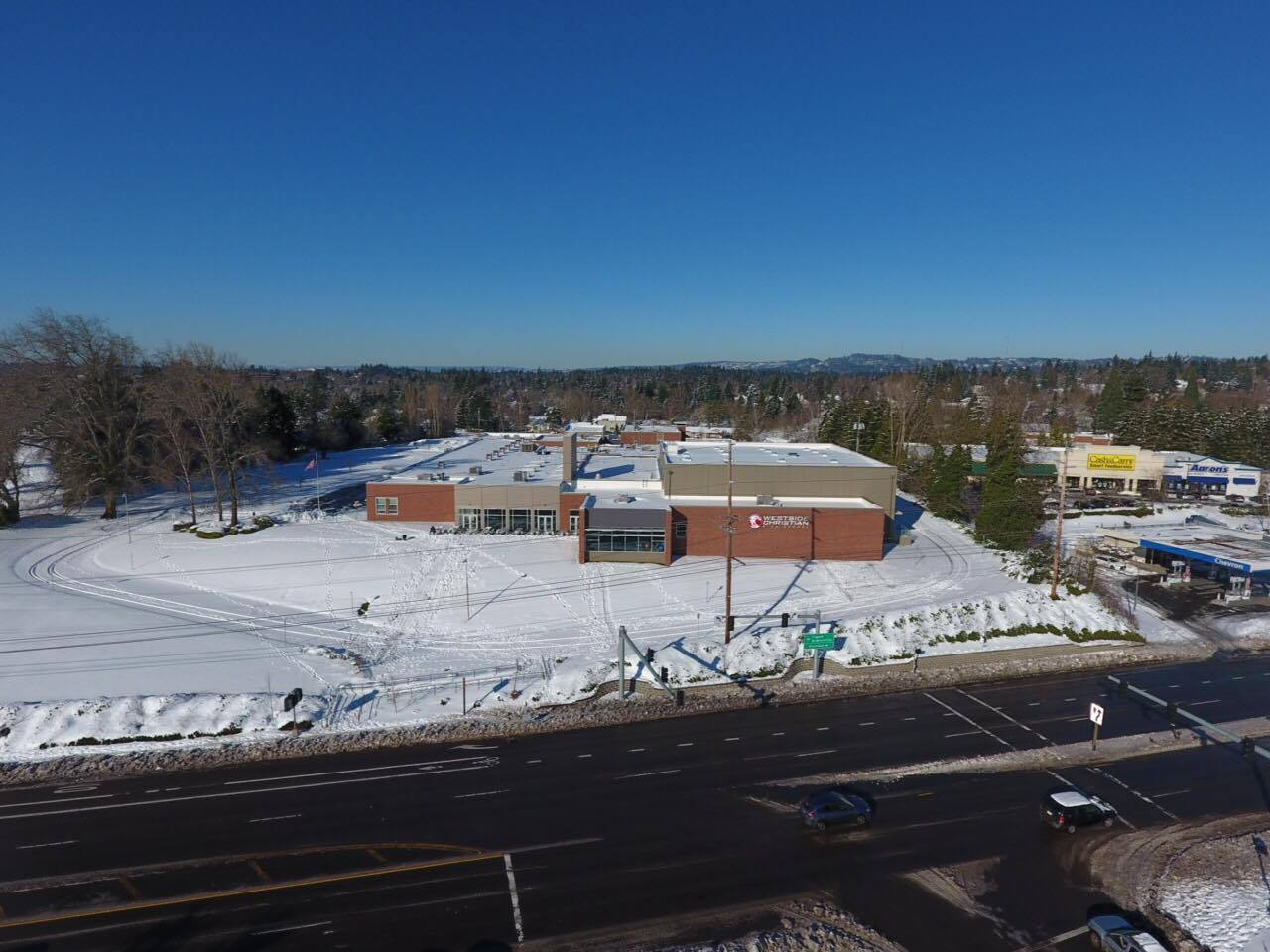

Location
- 8200 SW Pfaffle Street; Tigard, (Washington County), Oregon 97223; United States; 45°26′11″N 122°45′39″W

Information
- Type: Private
- Opened: 1981
- Head of school: Stephen Torode
- Grades: 9–12
- Enrollment: 290
- Colors: Red, black, and white
- Athletics conference: OSAA 3A Lewis & Clark League
- Mascot: The Eagle
- Team name: Eagles
- Website: wchsonline.org

Westside Christian High School is a private, Christian high school located in Tigard, Oregon, United States.

== History ==
In 1981, with 10 students and 6 teachers, Westside Christian High School opened its doors in the Collins View School building (now Riverdale High School) to serve families on the west side of town. In 1992, after a collaborative effort with Lake Bible Church, a new combined church and high school structure was built on the corner of Kruse Way and Carman Drive in Lake Oswego, Oregon.

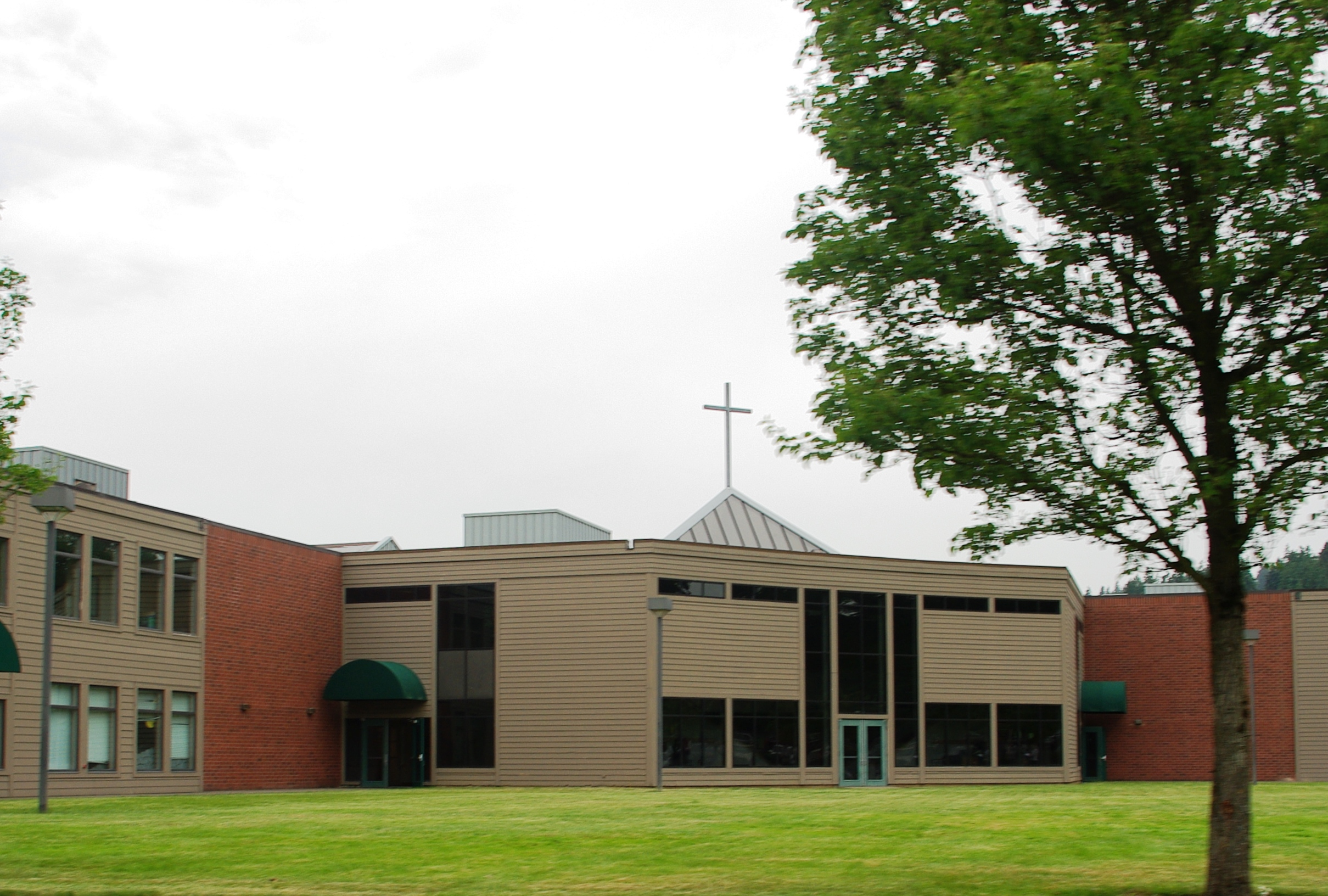
The Lake Oswego location, 2009

In 2011, the school announced plans to move to Tigard and a new, larger campus (7.4 acres) where they planned to eventually grow their enrollment to 450 students. The school received a $1 million grant from the M.J. Murdock Charitable Trust, to help pay for the new location.

In April 2013, Westside purchased the property at the intersection of Highway 99W and Highway 217, 20 minutes south of downtown Portland. They moved into this new campus in January 2014.

== Mission ==
Westside is a non-denominational Christian school whose mission is to inspire Godly transformation and Christ-like character through exceptional education and intentional discipleship to impact the world for Christ.

== Faculty and staff ==
The current head of Westside Christian High School is Stephen Torode.

Caleb Turner has been the athletic director since 2025.

== Academics ==
Westside offers 10 AP classes: AP Language and Composition, AP Literature and Composition, AP Calculus AB, AP Biology, AP Physics, AP European History, AP US History, AP World History, AP Human Geography, and AP Studio Art.

Westside offers 13 concurrent credit classes. WCHS has partnerships with both George Fox University (GFU) and Northwest Nazarene University (NNU) to offer concurrent high school and college credit through a selected group of classes, allowing students to obtain up to a total of 43 semester units. 11 classes (12 through GFU and 1 through NNU) are eligible for concurrent credit.

2017-18 Courses through George Fox University (semester system)

1. AP Literature & Composition will generate credit in En 120: Intro to Literature (3 credits)
2. AP Language & Composition will generate credit in En 101: College Composition (3 credits)
3. Pre-Calculus will generate credit in MA 115: Precalculus (4 credits)
4. AP Calculus AB will generate credit in MA 251: Calculus 1 (4 credits)
5. AP US History will generate credit in HIS 201: US History (3 credits)
6. AP World History will generate credit in HIS 211: Survey of World History I (3 credits)
7. AP European History will generate credit in HIS 212: Survey of World History II (3 credits)
8. Anatomy & Physiology will generate credit in BIO 121: Intro to Anatomy & Physiology (4 credits)
9. AP Biology will generate credit in BIO 102: General Biology II (4 credits)
10. AP Physics will generate credit in PHS 121 Intro to Physics (4 credits)
11. AP Chemistry
12. Government/Economics

2017-18 Courses through Northwest Nazarene University (semester system)

1. Spanish 4 will generate credit in SPAN 2010 & 2020 Intermediate Spanish (4 credits for each semester)

Historically, 90–95% of Westside students attend 4-year colleges after graduating. 95% of all WCHS teachers have a master's degree and/or their teaching credential.

=== Accreditation and memberships ===
- AdvancED (Northwest Accreditation Commission)
- Oregon Schools Athletic Association
- Pacific Northwest Association for College Admission Counseling

== Athletics ==
Westside competes in Oregon's 3A Lewis & Clark League and currently offers 8 unique sports across 3 seasons. Spring sports include track and field, boys' and girls’ golf, boys and girls' tennis, boys volleyball, baseball, and softball; in Fall, cross country, soccer, and girls' volleyball are available; and the winter sports are basketball and girls' cheerleading.

Westside boys basketball won their first 3A state title in February 2025. Boys soccer won their first state championship in November 2025. Westside’s game day cheer team won their first state small schools state title in January 2026.

== Performing arts ==
Westside's choir program has won the OSAA 3A State Championship for 15 consecutive years (skipping 2020 when there was no competition), from 2007 to 2023. Westside students also perform two full-length drama productions at Westside each year.

== See also ==
- List of high schools in Oregon
- Religion in Oregon
- Valley Catholic School
