= Norm Smith (American politician) =

American politician

Member of the Oregon House of Representatives from the 9th district
- In office 1979–1983
- Preceded by: Pat Whiting

Personal details
- Born: February 1947 (age 79) Portland, Oregon
- Party: Republican
- Profession: musician

Norman Smith (born February 1947), was an American politician who was a member of the Oregon House of Representatives. He is a former musician and member of the band Mr. Lucky & The Gamblers.
