= Pat Whiting =

American politician

Member of the Oregon House of Representatives from the 7th district
- In office January 8, 1973 – January 1979
- Preceded by: James Henderson, Roger E. Martin, Allen B. Pynn, Leo M. Thornton
- Succeeded by: Norm Smith

Personal details
- Born: Patricia D. Carpio; 22 October 1940 Chicago, Illinois, U.S.
- Died: 23 June 2010 (aged 69) Tigard, Oregon, U.S.
- Party: Democratic
- Spouse: Vince Whiting
- Education: San Jose State University (BA) Lewis & Clark College (Masters in Public Administration)

Pat Whiting (born Patricia D. Carpio, October 22, 1940 – June 23, 2010) was an American activist and politician from Oregon. Whiting served three terms in the Oregon House of Representatives, where she was the first Filipino and Asian American representative and the first woman representative from her district. Whiting served from 1973 through 1981.

Born in Chicago, and raised in California, Whiting relocated to Tigard, Oregon, just outside of Portland, after enrolling in graduate school and her marrying Vince Whiting. She was a community activist and a member of a number of organizations until her death due to lymphoma.

== Early life ==
Whiting was born Patricia D. Carpio to Doris Runolfson in Chicago, Illinois. Whiting was of Filipino, Icelandic and Native American descent. Whiting was the eldest child of eight children, born into a migrant farmworker family. Her mother, Doris, used a wheelchair due to her multiple sclerosis and depended on Whiting for assistance in raising her sisters and brothers. When Whiting was 10, she and her mother moved to Gilroy, California, where Whiting graduated from high school in 1959.

== Education ==
Whiting attended San Jose State College, completed graduate work at Oregon State University and received a master's degree from Lewis and Clark College in Public Administration. While at SJSC, Whiting majored in Arts and Humanities, and was "active in the student body and participated in multiple plays and musicals, choir, flamenco dance and the International Platform Speaker Association." While in school, Whiting travelled around the United States with a troupe of actors for a play entitled “So this is College" for the U.S.O. tour.

=== Mentorship with Carl D. Duncan ===
Whiting served as Carl Duncan's student assistant. Duncan hired Whiting to work as a student secretary in the Field Studies Department office from 1964-66. The two developed an admirable mentor-student relationship and Whiting became Duncan's "Goddaughter". Duncan financial supported Whiting and her family, including Duncan's estate funding the college educations of Whiting's siblings and leaving his Menlo Park home to her in his will.

== Political career ==
=== Election ===
First elected to the Oregon House of Representatives as a Democrat in 1973, Whiting served three terms as representative. Whiting was the only member from Metzger and the first Democratic woman from Washington County, Oregon to serve as well as the only Asian American elected to the House. A year before her election, Whiting gave the keynote speech for the 37th North American Wildlife and Natural Resources Conference in Mexico City, Mexico. Whiting was a member of the Interim Committee on Agriculture, Natural Resources, Environment and Energy, the Land Conservation and Development Commission and civilian representative to the Solid Waste Advisory Committee in Washington County.

=== Co-sponsored legislation ===
Whiting co-sponsored legislation to ban smoking tobacco products in public places, the first of its kind in Oregon.

Whiting was a co-sponsor of the Oregon Bottle Bill, an effort intended to curb litter and pollution that first passed in 1971.

Whiting co-sponsored legislation to establish Project Independence, a program that helps senior citizens age in place and maintain their autonomy.

In her first year as representative, Whiting co-sponsored House Bill 2930, which would have made anti-LGBTQ discrimination illegal. The activist who authored the bill noted that legislators who sponsored HB2930 took a risk in their political careers.

=== Chlorofluorocarbon ban ===
She wrote and helped to pass legislation that banned chlorofluorocarbon pollution that contributes to the depletion of the earth's stratospheric ozone layer, the first such legislation in the country. "In the area of national energy policy, our energy resource allocation, use, and depletion is now one of the major confrontations of our time," Whiting wrote.

The legislation passed in 1975 and after the Oregon ban went into effect in 1977, 13 other states and Congress introduced similar proposals. The New York Times said that, "Oregon is an innovator in such environmental legislation.

Whiting appeared on the Today Show in defense of the ban on chlorofluorocarbons.

Whiting pushed the House to establish the Oregon Department of Energy and adopt an "Oregon Energy Policy". Whiting wrote: "It is essential that future generations not be left a legacy of vanished or depleted resources, resulting in massive environmental, social and financial impact. The Oregon goal is to promote the efficient use of energy and to develop permanently sustainable energy resources."

=== Equal Rights Amendment ===
In the House of Representatives, Whiting was a member of the Oregon Women's Political Caucus, which worked to ratify the Equal Rights Amendment. Betty Roberts, who served with Whiting, and Gail Wells wrote, "We were a diverse group of Republicans and Democrats ranging in age from thirty to seventy-five, lawyers and housewives, office workers, social workers and union workers, most married but some not, with children from pre-school age to grown and out on their own. The convergence of these women in my committee room was no accident. Every one of us had spirit and a common purpose." The state was the 25th in the country to ratify the ERA.

=== Land Use Planning ===
As a member of the Oregon Joint Legislative Committee, which oversaw the Land Conservation and Development Commission responsible for Land Use Planning Directives, Whiting advocated for preservation of open spaces and development of recreational land. Whiting stated concern for the flood plain, urban sprawl, public transportation, congestion and population density, and the environmental toll of increased resource consumption. As such, Whiting believed that a more "progressive attitude" was necessary to address the "limited carrying capacity based on limited life support systems." Whiting believed that the state of Oregon needed to conserve energy and invest in public transportation research.

== Community work ==
Whiting, who "rose out of poverty as a migrant worker," believed in advancing personal and professional opportunities for women. Whiting advocated for the preservation of and investment in Metzger Park. The park's public hall is named the Patricia D. Whiting Hall. Whiting served as a board member for the Washington County Community Action poverty program. Whiting was also a board member of the tri-county Loaves and Fishes, Beaverton's Police Advisory and the Citizen Participation Organization.

== Personal life ==
Whiting was married to Vince Whiting for 42 years. The couple renewed their wedding vows eight times, every five years complete with new rings, the last of which took place at Legacy Meridian Park Medical Center.

Whiting is survived by her husband, Vince, as well as seven siblings, Connie Melanson, Elyse Cotant, George, Mason, Masao Jim and Morton Uyeda, and Leon Castillo. On April 3, 2015, the Oregon House of Representatives passed a resolution that recorded Whiting as a "devoted and inspirational community leader, legislator, wife and sister. Dress for Success of Oregon named their career center after Whiting in 2013.

== Awards and achievements ==
- Izaak Walton League Conservationist of the Year, 1979
- Carnegie Foundation Top 10 U.S. State Legislation Award, 1975
- Eagleton Institute of Politics, Top 10 state legislators in United States
- Rutgers University top 10 state legislators in United States
- Washington County OSU Extension Service Pioneer Citizen Stateswoman Award
- Distinguished Service Award from the city of Tualatin
- Harold M. Hayes Award, 2009, for citizen involvement in Washington County, Oregon
