= 2018 U.S. Open Cup =

105th edition of cup competition in American soccer

2018 Lamar Hunt U.S. Open Cup
Tournament details
- Country: United States
- Teams: 97

Final positions
- Champions: Houston Dynamo (1st title)
- Runners-up: Philadelphia Union
- 2019 CONCACAF Champions League: Houston Dynamo

Tournament statistics
- Matches played: 96
- Goals scored: 332 (3.46 per match)
- Top goal scorer: Mauro Manotas (6 goals)

The 2018 Lamar Hunt U.S. Open Cup was the 105th edition of the U.S. Open Cup, a knockout cup competition in American soccer. It is the oldest ongoing competition in the United States and was contested by 97 teams from leagues in the U.S. system.

The 97 entrants included the 20 American clubs from Major League Soccer and 22 non-affiliated American clubs in the United Soccer League. The qualification tournament, held in 2017, determined the 13 teams from local amateur leagues. The 20 entrants from the Premier Development League and 19 of the 22 from the National Premier Soccer League were determined based on results achieved in those leagues in 2017. Cash prizes and travel reimbursement costs were also increased for the 2018 edition. Sporting Kansas City was the defending champion but were not able to successfully defend the title, losing in the quarterfinals to Houston Dynamo.

The 2018 tournament initially excluded clubs from the North American Soccer League, which suspended operations for the year, but a decision by the Open Cup Committee in March 2018 allowed for the entry of NPSL teams Jacksonville Armada FC, Miami FC 2, and New York Cosmos B as part of an added play-in round, which brought the total number of NPSL teams participating in the tournament to 22.

== Qualification ==
Enter in Play-in round (Open Division)	Enter in First round (Open Division)			Enter in Second round (Second Division)	Enter in Fourth round (First Division)
NPSL/PDL; 4 teams/2 teams	Local Qualifiers; 13 teams	NPSL; 18 teams	PDL; 18 teams	USL; 22 teams	MLS; 20 teams
NPSL: Brooklyn Italians; Jacksonville Armada FC; Miami FC 2; New York Cosmos B; PDL: FC Miami City; The Villages SC	Azteca FC; Christos FC; FC Denver; FC Kendall; Kendall Wanderers; La Máquina FC; Lansdowne Bhoys FC; L.A. Wolves FC; NTX Rayados; Red Force FC; Rochester River Dogz; Santa Ana Winds FC; Sporting Arizona FC	AFC Ann Arbor; CD Aguiluchos USA; Dakota Fusion FC; Detroit City FC; Duluth FC; Elm City Express; Erie Commodores FC; FC Arizona; FC Motown; FC Wichita; Fort Worth Vaqueros FC; Inter Nashville FC; Kingston Stockade FC; Kitsap Soccer Club; Miami United FC; Midland-Odessa FC; New Orleans Jesters; Orange County FC	Charlotte Eagles; FC Golden State Force^{$}; FC Tucson; Lakeland Tropics; Long Island Rough Riders; Michigan Bucks; Mississippi Brilla; Myrtle Beach Mutiny; New York Red Bulls U-23; Ocean City Nor'easters; OKC Energy U23; Portland Timbers U23s; Reading United AC; San Francisco City FC; Seacoast United Phantoms; SIMA Águilas; South Georgia Tormenta FC; Western Mass Pioneers	Charleston Battery; Charlotte Independence; Colorado Springs Switchbacks FC; FC Cincinnati; Fresno FC; Indy Eleven; Las Vegas Lights FC; Louisville City FC^{$}; Nashville SC; North Carolina FC; Oklahoma City Energy FC; Orange County SC; Penn FC; Phoenix Rising FC; Pittsburgh Riverhounds SC; Reno 1868 FC; Richmond Kickers; Sacramento Republic FC; Saint Louis FC; San Antonio FC; Tampa Bay Rowdies; Tulsa Roughnecks FC	Atlanta United FC; Chicago Fire; Colorado Rapids; Columbus Crew SC; D.C. United; FC Dallas; Houston Dynamo^{$$$}; LA Galaxy; Los Angeles FC; Minnesota United FC; New England Revolution; New York City FC; New York Red Bulls; Orlando City SC; Philadelphia Union^{$$}; Portland Timbers; Real Salt Lake; San Jose Earthquakes; Seattle Sounders FC; Sporting Kansas City

- $: Winner of $25,000 bonus for advancing the furthest in the competition from their respective divisions.
- $$: Winner of $100,000 for being the runner-up in the competition.
- $$$: Winner of $300,000 for winning the competition.

== Brackets ==
Play-in round May 6
**NPSL**	**Brooklyn Italians**	**3**
NPSL	New York Cosmos B	2
**NPSL**	**Jacksonville Armada FC**	**2**
PDL	The Villages SC	1
PDL	FC Miami City	1
**NPSL**	**Miami FC 2**	**3**

First round May 8–9
NPSL	Brooklyn Italians	0
**LQ**	**Lansdowne Bhoys FC**	**2**
NPSL	AFC Ann Arbor	0
**PDL**	**Ocean City Nor'easters**	**3**
**NPSL**	**Erie Commodores FC**	**1(5)**
LQ	Rochester River Dogz	1(4)
**NPSL**	**Detroit City FC**	**1(5)**
PDL	Michigan Bucks	1(4)
**PDL**	**Reading United AC**	**1(5)**
LQ	Christos FC	1(4)
**NPSL**	**FC Motown**	**2**
PDL	New York Red Bulls U-23	1
PDL	Myrtle Beach Mutiny	1
**PDL**	**South Georgia Tormenta FC**	**2**
**PDL**	**Seacoast United Phantoms**	**2(7)**
LQ	Kendall Wanderers	2(6)
PDL	Western Mass Pioneers	1
**NPSL**	**Elm City Express**	**2**
**PDL**	**Long Island Rough Riders**	**6***
NPSL	Kingston Stockade FC	3
**NPSL**	**Duluth FC**	**4(3)**
NPSL	Dakota Fusion FC	4(0)
PDL	SIMA Águilas	0
**NPSL**	**Jacksonville Armada FC**	**2**
**NPSL**	**Miami FC 2**	**4**
LQ	Red Force FC	0
**NPSL**	**Miami United FC**	**5**
LQ	FC Kendall	2
PDL	Charlotte Eagles	1
**NPSL**	**Inter Nashville FC**	**6**
NPSL	New Orleans Jesters	1(2)
**PDL**	**Mississippi Brilla**	**1(3)**
**LQ**	**NTX Rayados**	**2***
NPSL	Fort Worth Vaqueros FC	1
**NPSL**	**FC Wichita**	**3**
PDL	OKC Energy U23	1
**NPSL**	**Midland-Odessa Sockers FC**	**3**
PDL	Lakeland Tropics	0
**LQ**	**FC Denver**	**4**
LQ	Azteca FC	2
NPSL	FC Arizona	0
**LQ**	**Sporting Arizona FC**	**1**
**NPSL**	**Orange County FC**	**3**
LQ	Santa Ana Winds FC	0
**PDL**	**FC Golden State Force**	**3**
LQ	L.A. Wolves FC	1
**PDL**	**FC Tucson**	**2**
LQ	La Máquina FC	1
**PDL**	**Portland Timbers U23s**	**5**
NPSL	Kitsap Soccer Club	0
NPSL	CD Aguiluchos USA	0
**PDL**	**San Francisco City FC**	**4**

Second round May 16
**USL**	**North Carolina FC**	**3**
LQ	Lansdowne Bhoys FC	0
USL	Charlotte Independence	1
**PDL**	**Ocean City Nor'easters**	**3**
NPSL	Erie Commodores FC	1
**USL**	**Pittsburgh Riverhounds SC**	**2**
**USL**	**FC Cincinnati**	**4***
NPSL	Detroit City FC	1
PDL	Reading United AC	1(3)
**USL**	**Richmond Kickers**	**1(4)**
NPSL	FC Motown	1
**USL**	**Penn FC**	**3**
**USL**	**Charleston Battery**	**1**
PDL	South Georgia Tormenta FC	0
PDL	Seacoast United Phantoms	0
**NPSL**	**Elm City Express**	**2**
**USL**	**Louisville City FC**	**5**
PDL	Long Island Rough Riders	0
NPSL	Duluth FC	0
**USL**	**Saint Louis FC**	**2**
**NPSL**	**Jacksonville Armada FC**	**1**
USL	Tampa Bay Rowdies	0
NPSL	Miami FC 2	1
**NPSL**	**Miami United FC**	**3**
**USL**	**Nashville SC**	**2**
NPSL	Inter Nashville FC	0
**PDL**	**Mississippi Brilla**	**1**
USL	Indy Eleven	0
**LQ**	**NTX Rayados**	**5***
USL	Oklahoma City Energy FC	2
USL	Tulsa Roughnecks FC	3
**NPSL**	**FC Wichita**	**4**
NPSL	Midland-Odessa Sockers FC	0
**USL**	**San Antonio FC**	**4**
**USL**	**Colorado Springs Switchbacks FC**	**3**
LQ	FC Denver	2
**LQ**	**Sporting Arizona FC**	**1(5)**
USL	Phoenix Rising FC	1(4)
**USL**	**Fresno FC**	**2**
NPSL	Orange County FC	0
USL	Orange County SC	2
**PDL**	**FC Golden State Force**	**4**
**USL**	**Las Vegas Lights FC**	**4**
PDL	FC Tucson	2
**USL**	**Reno 1868 FC**	**7**
PDL	Portland Timbers U23s	3
**USL**	**Sacramento Republic FC**	**3**
PDL	San Francisco City FC	1

Third round May 22–23
**USL**	**North Carolina FC**	**4**
PDL	Ocean City Nor'easters	1
USL	Pittsburgh Riverhounds	1
**USL**	**FC Cincinnati**	**3**
**USL**	**Richmond Kickers**	**3**
USL	Penn FC	2
**USL**	**Charleston Battery**	**1**
NPSL	Elm City Express	0
**USL**	**Louisville City FC**	1
USL	Saint Louis FC	0
NPSL	Jacksonville Armada	0
**NPSL**	**Miami United FC**	**2**
**USL**	**Nashville SC**	**3**
PDL	Mississippi Brilla	1
**LQ**	**NTX Rayados**	**3**
NPSL	FC Wichita	2
**USL**	**San Antonio FC**	**1(5)**
USL	Colorado Springs Switchbacks FC	1(3)
LQ	Sporting Arizona FC	1
**USL**	**Fresno FC**	**2***
**PDL**	**FC Golden State Force**	**2**
USL	Las Vegas Lights FC	1
USL	Reno 1868 FC	0
**USL**	**Sacramento Republic FC**	**1**

Host team listed first
Bold = winner
* = after extra time, ( ) = penalty shootout score

Fourth round June 5–6
**MLS**	**Houston Dynamo**	**5**
LQ	NTX Rayados	0
USL	FC Cincinnati	0(1)
**MLS**	**Minnesota United FC**	**0(3)**
MLS	Real Salt Lake	0
**MLS**	**Sporting Kansas City**	**2**
USL	San Antonio FC	0
**MLS**	**FC Dallas**	**1**
**MLS**	**Los Angeles FC**	**2**
USL	Fresno FC	0
**USL**	**Sacramento Republic FC**	**2***
MLS	Seattle Sounders FC	1
**MLS**	**Portland Timbers**	**2**
MLS	San Jose Earthquakes	0
**MLS**	**LA Galaxy**	**3**
PDL	FC Golden State Force	1
**MLS**	**Philadelphia Union**	**5**
USL	Richmond Kickers	0
**MLS**	**New York Red Bulls**	**4**
MLS	New York City FC	0
**MLS**	**D.C. United**	**1(4)**
USL	North Carolina FC	1(3)
NPSL	Miami United FC	0
**MLS**	**Orlando City SC**	**3**
**MLS**	**Atlanta United FC**	**3**
USL	Charleston Battery	0
MLS	Columbus Crew SC	2(9)
**MLS**	**Chicago Fire**	**2(10)**
**USL**	**Louisville City FC**	**3**
MLS	New England Revolution	2
**USL**	**Nashville SC**	**2**
MLS	Colorado Rapids	0

Round of 16; June 15–20
**MLS**	**Houston Dynamo**	**1**
MLS	Minnesota United FC	0
**MLS**	**Sporting Kansas City**	**3**
MLS	FC Dallas	2
**MLS**	**Los Angeles FC**	**3**
USL	Sacramento Republic FC	2
**MLS**	**Portland Timbers**	**1**
MLS	LA Galaxy	0
**MLS**	**Philadelphia Union**	**2**
MLS	New York Red Bulls	1
MLS	D.C. United	1(2)
**MLS**	**Orlando City SC**	**1(4)**
MLS	Atlanta United FC	0
**MLS**	**Chicago Fire**	**1**
**USL**	**Louisville City FC**	**2**
USL	Nashville SC	1

Quarterfinals; July 18
**MLS**	**Houston Dynamo**	**4**
MLS	Sporting Kansas City	2
**MLS**	**Los Angeles FC**	**3**
MLS	Portland Timbers	2
**MLS**	**Philadelphia Union**	**1**
MLS	Orlando City SC	0
**MLS**	**Chicago Fire**	**4**
USL	Louisville City FC	0

Semifinals; August 8
**MLS**	**Houston Dynamo**	**3(7)**
MLS	Los Angeles FC	3(6)
**MLS**	**Philadelphia Union**	**3**
MLS	Chicago Fire	0

Final; September 26
**MLS**	**Houston Dynamo**	**3**
MLS	Philadelphia Union	0

- Host team listed first
- **Bold** = winner
- * = after extra time, ( ) = penalty shootout score

== Match details ==
All times local to game site.

=== Play-in round ===
Draw announced April 4.

May 6	The Villages SC (PDL)	1–2	Jacksonville Armada FC (NPSL)	Jacksonville, Florida
7:00 pm EDT	De Melo (yellow card) 3'; Maciel (yellow card) 20'; Torres 59'; Lopes (yellow card) 69'	USSF Report; JAX Report	Kilduff 6'; Yuma (yellow card) 49'; Charpie 70'; Doyle (yellow card) 73'; Beckie (yellow card) 90'	Stadium: Southern Oak Stadium; Referee: Sean-Michael Kemp

May 6	FC Miami City (PDL)	1–3	Miami FC 2 (NPSL)	Miami, Florida
7:00 pm EDT	Nembhard 55'	USSF Report; MFC Report	Smart 11'; Ruthven (yellow card) 21'; Suárez 57'; Michaud 90+1'	Stadium: Tropical Park Stadium; Referee: Alejo Calume

May 6	Brooklyn Italians (NPSL)	3–2	New York Cosmos B (NPSL)	Brooklyn, New York
8:00 pm EDT	Barone 32'; Hansen 58', 85'	USSF Report; NYC Report; BKN Report	Bardic 37'; Wojcik 59'	Stadium: Long Island University Field; Referee: Christian Centeno

=== First round ===
Draw announced April 4.

May 8	Portland Timbers U23s (PDL)	5–0	Kitsap Soccer Club (NPSL)	Salem, Oregon
7:00 pm PDT	Ortiz-Flores 14'; Shahmirzadi 33' (o.g.); Eronemo 51' (o.g.); Tchilao 62'; Walker 85'	Report; KSC Report; POR Report	Francis (red card) 12'	Stadium: McCulloch Stadium; Attendance: 470; Referee: Katja Koroleva

May 9	AFC Ann Arbor (NPSL)	0–3	Ocean City Nor'easters (PDL)	Ypsilanti, Michigan
6:00 pm EDT		OC Report; USSF Report	N'Dah 10'; Raioli 27'; Mompremier 52'	Stadium: Scicluna Field; Referee: Eric Lott

May 9	Miami FC 2 (NPSL)	4–0	Red Force FC (LQ)	Miami, Florida
7:00 pm EDT	Tyrpak 22', 45'; Mares 60'; Suárez 87'	MFC Report; USSF Report		Stadium: FIU Soccer Stadium; Referee: Juan Pablo Casas

May 9	Western Mass Pioneers (PDL)	1–2	Elm City Express (NPSL)	Ludlow, Massachusetts
7:00 pm EDT	Alencar Junior 45'	USSF Report	Asante 23', 82'	Stadium: Lusitano Stadium; Referee: Adam Kilpatrick

May 9	FC Motown (NPSL)	2–1	New York Red Bulls U-23 (PDL)	Madison, New Jersey
7:00 pm EDT	Duka 34', 45'; (red card) 88'	USSF Report	Saramago 21'	Stadium: Ranger Stadium; Referee: John Hartley

May 9	Reading United AC (PDL)	1–1 (a.e.t.) (5–4 p)	Christos FC (LQ)	Reading, Pennsylvania
7:00 pm EDT	Roberts 59'	RUAC Report; USSF Report	Rudy 4'	Stadium: Alvernia University Stadium; Referee: Jarosław Werel
	Penalties
	Molloy (penalty scored); Hauret (penalty scored); Chretien (penalty scored); Lipinski (penalty scored); Roberts (penalty scored)

May 9	Erie Commodores FC (NPSL)	1–1 (a.e.t.) (5–4 p)	Rochester RiverDogz (LQ)	Erie, Pennsylvania
7:00 pm EDT	Philpot 27'	USSF Report	Gerber 45'	Stadium: Gannon University Stadium; Referee: Brian Miller

May 9	SIMA Águilas (PDL)	0–2	Jacksonville Armada FC (NPSL)	Montverde, Florida
7:00 pm EDT		JAX Report; USSF Report	Castellanos 53'; Doyle 76'	Stadium: Montverde Academy; Referee: Madžid Coric

May 9	Charlotte Eagles (PDL)	1–6	Inter Nashville FC (NPSL)	Matthews, North Carolina
7:00 pm EDT	Fidler 56' (pen.)	USSF Report	Aruh 4', 6', 35'; Reichenberger 18'; Sakou 45+', 85'	Stadium: Sportsplex at Matthews; Referee: Eric Barnes

May 9	Myrtle Beach Mutiny (PDL)	1–2	South Georgia Tormenta FC (PDL)	Little River, South Carolina
7:30 pm EDT	Delusma 56'	USSF Report	Arslan 76'; Soler 82'	Stadium: North Myrtle Beach Sports Park Field No. 1 Referee: Sergii Demianchuk

May 9	Seacoast United Phantoms (PDL)	2–2 (a.e.t.) (7–6 p)	Kendall Wanderers (LQ)	Amesbury, Massachusetts
7:30 pm EDT	Sakei 45'; Jordan 86'	USSF Report	Noctor (red card) 14'; Samati 37'; Robertson 90'	Stadium: Seacoast United Sports Park; Referee: Max Perkins

May 9	Miami United FC (NPSL)	5–2	FC Kendall (LQ)	Hialeah, Florida
7:30 pm EDT	Granitto 17'; Gorbsov 24'; Ochoa 31', 42', 73'	USSF Report	Mion 15'; Schmid 90+4'	Stadium: Ted Hendricks Stadium

May 9	Detroit City FC (NPSL)	1–1 (a.e.t.) (5–4 p)	Michigan Bucks (PDL)	Hamtramck, Michigan
7:30 pm EDT	Lawson 57'; Janicki (red card) 96'	Report	Pinheiro 84'	Stadium: Keyworth Stadium; Attendance: 3,416; Referee: Nick Balcer

May 9	Brooklyn Italians (NPSL)	0–2	Lansdowne Bhoys FC (LQ)	Brooklyn, New York
8:00 pm EDT		Report	Kavanagh 9'; 47' (o.g.)	Stadium: Long Island University Field; Referee: Thomas Snyder

May 9	Long Island Rough Riders (PDL)	6–3 (a.e.t.)	Kingston Stockade FC (NPSL)	Massapequa Park, New York
8:00 pm EDT	Botte 56', 114'; Wharf 80'; Rosario 108'; Ledula 112', 120+2'	LIRR Report	Jeter 11'; Creswick 52'; Mattos (yellow card) ?' (yellow-red card) 90+2'; Koziol 119'	Stadium: John Burns Park; Referee: Dave Breckner

May 9	New Orleans Jesters (NPSL)	1–1 (a.e.t.) (2–3 p)	Mississippi Brilla (PDL)	New Orleans, Louisiana
7:00 pm CDT	Peers 72'	USSF Report	Brock 65'	Stadium: Pan American Stadium; Referee: Tyler Mitcham

May 9	FC Wichita (NPSL)	3–1	OKC Energy U23 (PDL)	Wichita, Kansas
7:00 pm CDT	Sosa 38', 39'; Andoh 90+1'	USSF Report	Garcia 77'	Stadium: Trinity Academy; Referee: Luis Tribaldo

May 9	Duluth FC (NPSL)	4–4 (a.e.t.) (3–0 p)	Dakota Fusion FC (NPSL)	Duluth, Minnesota
7:30 pm CDT	Watt 31'; Ramos 32', 35', 50'; Adika (red card) 93'	Duluth FC Report; USSF Report	Stockman-Willis 4'; Johnson 47', 48'; Gauld 63'	Stadium: James S. Malosky Stadium; Referee: Matt Printup
	Penalties
	Castro (penalty scored); Watt (penalty scored); Margolin (penalty scored)

May 9	Midland-Odessa Sockers FC (NPSL)	3–0	Lakeland Tropics (PDL)	Midland, Texas
7:30 pm CDT	Lao 33' (pen.); Dominguez 39'; Velazquez 44'	USSF Report		Stadium: Grande Communications Stadium; Attendance: 657; Referee: Ramón Bermudez, Jr.

May 9	NTX Rayados (LQ)	2–1 (a.e.t.)	Fort Worth Vaqueros (NPSL)	Dallas, Texas
7:30 pm CDT	Martinez 6'; Okeke 115'	USSF Report	Edet 25'	Stadium: Richland College Field No. 10; Referee: Brandon Gardner

May 9	CD Aguiluchos USA (NPSL)	0–4	San Francisco City FC (PDL)	Oakland, California
6:00 pm PDT		USSF Report	Lombardi 44'; Hurlow-Paonessa 45'; Hughes 80'; Bagramyan 90'	Stadium: Raimondi Park; Referee: Turan Ozdemir

May 9	FC Denver (LQ)	4–2	Azteca FC (LQ)	Westminster, Colorado
7:15 pm MDT	Castillo 29', 54', 90+17'; Bernhardt 37'	Report	Munoz 58'; Aguilera 90+7'	Stadium: North Stadium; Referee: Adam Zarrin

May 9	FC Golden State Force (PDL)	3–1	L.A. Wolves FC (LQ)	Whittier, California
7:00 pm PDT	Manfredini 19'; Faramilio 56'; Lopez Ruiz 71'	LAW Report; USSF Report	Gomez 85'	Stadium: Rio Hondo College; Referee: Robert Sarfaraz

May 9	Orange County FC (NPSL)	3–0	Santa Ana Winds FC (LQ)	Irvine, California
7:00 pm PDT	ten Bosch 43', 80'; Canale	Report		Stadium: Championship Soccer Stadium; Referee: Samantha Martinez

May 9	FC Arizona (NPSL)	0–1	Sporting Arizona FC (LQ)	Mesa, Arizona
7:00 pm MST		Report	Guse 73'	Stadium: John Riggs Stadium; Referee: Robi Hullner

May 9	FC Tucson (PDL)	2–1	La Máquina FC (LQ)	Tucson, Arizona
7:30 pm MST	Romero 2'; Gonzalez 55'	Report	Velazquez 31'	Stadium: Kino North Stadium; Referee: Todd Woodhull

=== Second round ===
Draw announced April 11.

May 16	North Carolina FC (USL)	3–0	Lansdowne Bhoys FC (LQ)	Cary, North Carolina
7:00 pm EDT	Tobin 2'; Lomis 44'; Luxbacher 74'	NCFC Report		Stadium: Sahlen's Stadium at lWakeMed Soccer Park; Attendance: 1,754; Referee: Gabriel Rivera

May 16	Erie Commodores FC (NPSL)	1–2	Pittsburgh Riverhounds SC (USL)	Erie, Pennsylvania
7:00 pm EDT	Philpot 45'	PIT Report Report	Vancaeyezeele 4'; Kerr 30' (pen.)	Stadium: McConnell Family Stadium; Attendance: 451; Referee: James Duling

May 16	Reading United AC (PDL)	1–1 (a.e.t.) (3–4 p)	Richmond Kickers (USL)	Reading, Pennsylvania
7:00 pm EDT	Bennett 70'	Report; RIC Report; RUAC Report Report	Osei-Wusu 8'; Umar (red card) 115'	Stadium: Don Thomas Stadium; Attendance: 119; Referee: Brandon Smith
	Penalties
	Molloy (penalty scored); Krutzen (penalty scored); Lipinski (penalty missed); Maloney (penalty scored); Bennett (penalty missed)		(penalty scored) Imura; (penalty scored) Gonzalez; (penalty missed) Williams; (penalty scored) Cordovés; (penalty scored) Hlavaty

May 16	Louisville City FC (USL)	5–0	Long Island Rough Riders (PDL)	Louisville, Kentucky
7:00 pm EDT	Smith 25'; Ilić 37'; Spencer 68'; Ownby 81'; Lancaster 86'	LOU Report Report		Stadium: Lynn Stadium; Attendance: 2,000; Referee: Brandon Artis

May 16	FC Motown (NPSL)	1–3	Penn FC (USL)	Madison, New Jersey
7:00 pm EDT	Duka 53'	PFC Report Report	Jaime 79'; Baffoe 80'; Galvão 90+'	Stadium: Ranger Stadium; Attendance: 525; Referee: Luis Arroyo

May 16	Charleston Battery (USL)	1–0	South Georgia Tormenta FC (PDL)	Charleston, South Carolina
7:00 pm EDT	Okonkwo 21'; Rittmeyer (yellow card) 46' (yellow-red card) 63'	CHB Report Report	Vinyals (yellow card) 37' (yellow-red card) 87'	Stadium: MUSC Health Stadium; Attendance: 1,284; Referee: David Erbacher

May 16	Charlotte Independence (USL)	1–3	Ocean City Nor'easters (PDL)	Matthews, North Carolina
7:30 pm EDT	Herrera 58'	OCN Report Report	Gurrieri 4', 7'; Mompremier 44'	Stadium: Sportsplex at Matthews; Attendance: 300; Referee: Eric Usher

May 16	Seacoast United Phantoms (PDL)	0–2	Elm City Express (NPSL)	Amesbury, Massachusetts
7:30 pm EDT	Bennett (red card) 90'	Report	Saunchez 80', 88'	Stadium: Seacoast United Sports Park; Attendance: 150; Referee: Michael Dee

May 16	FC Cincinnati (USL)	4–1 (a.e.t.)	Detroit City FC (NPSL)	Cincinnati, Ohio
7:30 pm EDT	Welshman 35', 99', 110'; Bone 94'	http://www.ussoccer.com/lamar-hunt-us-open-cup/open-cup-tournaments/2018-usoc/2018-us-open-cup-second-round/20180516-us-open-cup-second-round-fc-cincinnati-vs-detroit-city-fc Report	Lawson 31'	Stadium: Gettler Stadium; Attendance: 2,500; Referee: Eric Tattersall

May 16	Mississippi Brilla (PDL)	1–0	Indy Eleven (USL)	Clinton, Mississippi
7:00 pm CDT	Easterling 82'	IND Report; MIS Report Report		Stadium: Clinton High School; Attendance: 400; Referee: Alex Connelly

May 16	Tulsa Roughnecks FC (USL)	3–4	FC Wichita (NPSL)	Tulsa, Oklahoma
7:00 pm CDT	Pírez 30', 38'; Lennon 50'; Vuković (yellow card) 68' (yellow-red card) 87'	USSF Report; TUL Report; WIC Report Report	Gomez (yellow card) 25' (yellow-red card) 48'; Wells 35'; F. Tayou 47', 90+1'	Stadium: Hurricane Soccer & Track Stadium; Attendance: 634; Referee: Jose Lara

May 16	Duluth FC (NPSL)	0–2	Saint Louis FC (USL)	Duluth, Minnesota
7:00 pm CDT		USSF Report; STL Report Report	Dacres 25'; Hertzog 35'	Stadium: Public Schools Stadium; Attendance: 584; Referee: Chris Ruska

May 16	Sacramento Republic FC (USL)	3–1	San Francisco City FC (PDL)	Sacramento, California
5:00 pm PDT	Alemán 24'; Bijev 61'; Moffat 68'	SAC Report Report	Lombardi 31'	Stadium: Hornet Field; Attendance: 300; Referee: Elijio Arreguin

May 16	Jacksonville Armada (NPSL)	1–0	Tampa Bay Rowdies (USL)	Jacksonville, Florida
8:30 pm EDT	Banks 58'	TBR Report; JAX Report; Report		Stadium: Southern Oak Stadium; Attendance: 374; Referee: Matthew Miscannon

May 16	Miami FC 2 (NPSL)	1–3	Miami United FC (NPSL)	Miami, Florida
8:30 pm EDT	Mares 17'; Tyrpak (red card) 45'	MIAF Report Report	Ochoa 49', 52'; Pelae 90+3'	Stadium: FIU Soccer Stadium; Attendance: 100; Referee: Andres Vidales

May 16	Nashville SC (USL)	2–0	Inter Nashville FC (NPSL)	Nashville, Tennessee
7:30 pm CDT	Hume 19', 89'	NSC Report Report		Stadium: Vanderbilt Soccer/Lacrosse Complex; Attendance: 2,077; Referee: Leland Grant

May 16	NTX Rayados (LQ)	5–2 (a.e.t.)	OKC Energy FC (USL)	Dallas, Texas
7:30 pm CDT	Rodriguez 41', 118'; Okeke 90' (pen.), 105'; Martinez 109'	OKC Report Report	Rasmussen 51' (pen.); González 60'	Stadium: Richland College Field No. 10; Attendance: 250; Referee: Ramon Bermudez Jr.

May 16	Midland-Odessa Sockers FC (NPSL)	0–4	San Antonio FC (USL)	Midland, Texas
7:30 pm CDT		SAFC Report; MOS Report Report	King 33'; Lopez 87'; Rodriguez 90'; Gordon 90'	Stadium: Grande Communications Stadium; Attendance: 460; Referee: Jorge Luna Hernandez

May 16	Colorado Springs Switchbacks FC (USL)	3–2	FC Denver (LQ)	Colorado Springs, Colorado
7:00 pm MDT	Eboussi 55'; Macias 58'; Burt 86' (pen.)	COS Report Report	Magallanes 36'; Castillo 77' (pen.)	Stadium: Weidner Field; Attendance: 135; Referee: Chris Greer

May 16	Sporting Arizona FC (LQ)	1–1 (a.e.t.) (5–4 p)	Phoenix Rising FC (USL)	Chandler, Arizona
7:30 pm MST	Arrubla 67'	PHX Report; SAZ Report	Cortez 64'	Stadium: Chandler-Gilbert Community College; Referee: Paul Nothman
	Penalties
	Flood (penalty scored); Vulovich (penalty scored); LaMarca (penalty scored); Guse (penalty scored); Paul (penalty missed); Kishimoto (penalty scored)		(penalty missed) Cortez; (penalty scored) Johnson; (penalty scored) Frater; (penalty scored) Awako; (penalty scored) Dia; (penalty missed) Wakasa

May 16	Fresno FC (USL)	2–0	Orange County FC (NPSL)	Clovis, California
7:00 pm PDT	Campbell 95'; Bustamante 118'	FRE Report Report		Stadium: Lamonica Stadium; Attendance: 1,671; Referee: Turan Ozdemir

May 16	Orange County SC (USL)	2–4	FC Golden State Force (PDL)	Irvine, California
7:00 pm PDT	Duke 28'; Enevoldsen 33'	Report	Villalobos 30'; Ricardo 48' (pen.) (yellow card) 76'; Villava 67'; Kelly (yellow card) 80'; Fonseca 89' (yellow card) 89'; Miranda (yellow card) 90+2'	Stadium: Orange County Great Park; Attendance: 500; Referee: Omeed Azadpour

May 16	Reno 1868 FC (USL)	7–3	Portland Timbers U23s (PDL)	Reno, Nevada
7:30 pm PDT	van Ewijk 45+1', 47', 82'; Musovski 69' (pen.), 73'; Mfeka 85'; Thierjung 90+3'	RNO Report; POR Report Report	Shimazaki 29'; Verstraaten 40'; Yomba 58' (o.g.)	Stadium: Greater Nevada Field; Attendance: 1,500; Referee: Nicholas Marin

May 16	Las Vegas Lights FC (USL)	4–2	FC Tucson (PDL)	Paradise, Nevada
7:30 pm PDT	Alvarez 5'; Alatorre 9'; Ochoa 56', 66'	LVL Report; TUC Report Report	Romero 39'; Valenzuela 48'	Stadium: Peter Johann Soccer Field; Attendance: 2,251; Referee: Alejandro Aguilera

=== Third round ===
Draw announced May 14.

May 22	North Carolina FC (USL)	4–1	Ocean City Nor'easters (PDL)	Cary, North Carolina
7:00 pm EDT	Lomis 8' da Luz 26'; Fortune 66'; Ewolo 83'	NCFC Report	Ilic 17'	Stadium: Sahlen's Stadium at WakeMed Soccer Park; Attendance: 1,778; Referee: Gustavo Solorio

May 23	Pittsburgh Riverhounds SC (USL)	1–3	FC Cincinnati (USL)	Pittsburgh, Pennsylvania
7:00 pm EDT	Lubahn (yellow card) 78'; Chin 88'	CIN report PGH report Box score Report	McLaughlin 39'; Laing 61' (yellow card) 68'; Haber 62'	Stadium: Highmark Stadium; Attendance: 1,500; Referee: Kevin Fikar

May 23	Richmond Kickers (USL)	3–2	Penn FC (USL)	Richmond, Virginia
7:00 pm EDT	Fernando 13', 22'; Cordovés 83'	RIC Report; PENN Report	Rivera 36', 60'	Stadium: City Stadium; Attendance: 1,927; Referee: JC Griggs

May 23	Charleston Battery (USL)	1–0	Elm City Express (NPSL)	Charleston, South Carolina
7:00 pm EDT	Wild 83'	CHB Report Report		Stadium: MUSC Health Stadium; Attendance: 1,242; Referee: Sergii Demianchuk

May 23	Louisville City FC (USL)	1–0	Saint Louis FC (USL)	Louisville, Kentucky
7:00 pm EDT	Totsch 68'	LOU Report; STL Report	Greig (yellow card) 80'	Stadium: Lynn Stadium; Attendance: 2,008; Referee: Joshua Brooks

May 23	Jacksonville Armada (NPSL)	0–2	Miami United FC (NPSL)	Jacksonville, Florida
7:00 pm EDT		JAX Report Report	Granitto 21'; Gorobsov 26'	Stadium: Southern Oak Stadium; Attendance: 504; Referee: Matthew Miscannon

May 23	NTX Rayados (LQ)	3–2	FC Wichita (NPSL)	Dallas, Texas
7:30 pm CDT	Ramos 6'; Escalera 28'; Salas 86'	WIC Report Report	Landaverde 60'; Ochoa 65'; Cubero (red card) 90+5'	Stadium: Richland College Field No. 10; Attendance: 200; Referee: Travis Haight

May 23	Nashville SC (USL)	3–1	Mississippi Brilla (PDL)	Nashville, Tennessee
7:30 pm CDT	Allen 19'; Woodberry 30'; Shroot 90+1'	NSH Report Report	Matsoso 60'	Stadium: Vanderbilt Soccer/Lacrosse Complex; Attendance: 1,047; Referee: Jose Lara

May 23	San Antonio FC (USL)	1–1 (a.e.t.) (5–3 p)	Colorado Springs Switchbacks FC (USL)	San Antonio, Texas
7:30 pm CDT	Castillo 8' (pen.); McCarthy (yellow card) 89'	SA Report; COS Report	Uzo 26'; Eboussi (yellow card) 58'; Robinson (yellow card) 104' (red card) 120'; Jack (yellow card) 120'	Stadium: Toyota Field; Attendance: 4,853; Referee: Elton Garcia
	Penalties
	Escalante (penalty scored); King (penalty scored); Rodriguez (penalty scored); Seth (penalty scored); Lopez (penalty scored)		Vercollone (penalty scored); Jack (penalty scored); Suggs (penalty scored); Macias (penalty missed)

May 23	Sporting Arizona FC (LQ)	1–2 (a.e.t.)	Fresno FC (USL)	Mesa, Arizona
7:30 pm MST	Flood 66'	FRE Report Report	Barrera 75'; Bustamante 99'	Stadium: John D. Riggs Stadium; Attendance: 500; Referee: Anthony Bersano

May 23	FC Golden State Force (PDL)	2–1	Las Vegas Lights FC (USL)	Downey, California
7:00 pm PDT	Faramilio 75', 90' (pen.)	LVL Report Report	Huiqui 81'	Stadium: Allen Layne Stadium; Attendance: 524; Referee: Samantha Martinez

May 23	Reno 1868 FC (USL)	0–1	Sacramento Republic FC (USL)	Reno, Nevada
7:30 pm PDT		RNO Report Report	Alemán 69'	Stadium: Greater Nevada Field; Attendance: 1,800; Referee: Vince Apple-Chiarella

=== Fourth round ===
Draw announced May 24.

June 5	Philadelphia Union (MLS)	5–0	Richmond Kickers (USL)	Chester, Pennsylvania
7:00 pm EDT	Elliott 3'; Accam 27' (pen.); Fontana 44'; Epps 45+2'; Simpson 49'; Rosenberry (yellow card) 88'	MLS Report; Philadelphia Report; Richmond Report		Stadium: Talen Energy Stadium; Attendance: 3,565; Referee: Lorant Varga (New York)

June 5	Louisville City FC (USL)	3–2	New England Revolution (MLS)	Louisville, Kentucky
7:00 pm EDT	Jimenez 11', (yellow card) 85'; Lancaster 37'; Ownby 62'	MLS Report; LCFC Report; New England Report	Segbers 5'; McMahon 26' (o.g.); Agudelo (yellow card) 90+4'	Stadium: Lynn Stadium; Attendance: 5,196; Referee: Aaron Hernandez (Kentucky)

June 5	D.C. United (MLS)	1–1 (a.e.t.) (4–3 p)	North Carolina FC (USL)	Germantown, Maryland
7:00 pm EDT	Harkes 25' (yellow card) 80'	DC Report; NCFC Report	Lomis 83'; Kandziora (yellow card) 109'; Smith (yellow card) 120+1'	Stadium: Maryland SoccerPlex; Attendance: 3,118; Referee: Matt Franz (Virginia)
	Penalties
	Asad (penalty scored); Mattocks (penalty scored); Acosta (penalty scored); Harkes (penalty missed); Miranda (penalty scored)		(penalty scored) Ríos; (penalty missed) Bekker; (penalty scored) Lomis; (penalty missed) Doue; (penalty scored) Tobin

June 6	Columbus Crew SC (MLS)	2–2 (a.e.t.) (9–10 p)	Chicago Fire (MLS)	Columbus, Ohio
7:00 pm EDT	Martinez 10'; Jahn 114'	Columbus Report; Chicago Report	Nikolić 45' 109'	Stadium: Mapfre Stadium; Attendance: 4,992; Referee: Marcos de Oliveira (Florida)
	Penalties
	Valenzuela (penalty scored); Jiménez (penalty missed); Argudo (penalty scored); Abubakar (penalty scored); Jahn (penalty scored); Martinez (penalty scored); Crognale (penalty scored); Sosa (penalty scored); Abu (penalty scored); Opoku (penalty scored); Ketterer (penalty missed)		(penalty missed) Nikolić; (penalty scored) Katai; (penalty scored) McCarty; (penalty scored) Campos; (penalty scored) Schweinsteiger; (penalty scored) Bronico; (penalty scored) Lillard; (penalty scored) Corrales; (penalty scored) Ramos; (penalty scored) Campbell; (penalty scored) Sánchez

June 6	New York Red Bulls (MLS)	4–0	New York City FC (MLS)	Harrison, New Jersey
7:30 pm EDT	Bezecourt 2'; Davis (yellow card) 34'; Long 52'; Royer 87', 89'	NYRB Report		Stadium: Red Bull Arena; Attendance: 9,496; Referee: Fotis Bazakos (Minnesota)

June 6	Miami United FC (NPSL)	0–3	Orlando City SC (MLS)	Hialeah, Florida
7:30 pm EDT	Shamar (yellow card) 45'; Schenfeld (yellow card) 51'; Tejera (yellow card) 68'; Domingues (yellow card) 70'	MUFC Report; OCFC Report	El Monir (yellow card) 33'; Stéfano 37'; Powers 53'; Victor 63' (yellow card) 73'	Stadium: Ted Hendricks Stadium; Attendance: 2,721; Referee: Elvis Osmanovic (Florida)

June 6	Atlanta United FC (MLS)	3–0	Charleston Battery (USL)	Kennesaw, Georgia
7:30 pm EDT	Carleton 14'; Barco 47' (pen.); Williams 64'	AUFC Report; Charleston Report	Candela (yellow card) 86'	Stadium: Fifth Third Bank Stadium; Attendance: 9,742; Referee: Guido Gonzales Jr. (Georgia)

June 6	FC Cincinnati (USL)	0–0 (a.e.t.) (1–3 p)	Minnesota United FC (MLS)	Cincinnati, Ohio
7:30 pm EDT	Smith (yellow card) 115'		Maximniiano (yellow card) 76'; Warner (yellow card) 80'; Kallman (yellow card) 120'	Stadium: Nippert Stadium; Attendance: 15,486; Referee: Eric Tattersall (Ohio)
	Penalties
	Walker (penalty missed) de Wit (penalty missed); Lahoud (penalty scored); Albadawi (penalty missed)		Ramirez (penalty scored); Martin (penalty scored); Kallman (penalty scored); Warner (penalty missed)

June 6	Nashville SC (USL)	2–0	Colorado Rapids (MLS)	Nashville, Tennessee
7:30 pm CDT	Azira 39' (o.g.); Jome (yellow card) 47'; Mensah 78'; James (yellow card) 90+4'	Nashville Report; Colorado Report	Serna (yellow card) 82'; Price (yellow card) 90+3'	Stadium: Vanderbilt Stadium; Attendance: 4,453; Referee: Kevin Broadley (North Carolina)

June 6	Houston Dynamo (MLS)	5–0	NTX Rayados (LQ)	Houston, Texas
7:30 pm CDT	Rodriguez 55', 71' (pen.); Padilla (yellow card) 65'; Quintanilla 68', 90+2'; Senderos (yellow card) 74'; Zaldivar 88'	MLS Report; Houston Report	Burciaga (yellow card) 9' (yellow-red card) 70'	Stadium: BBVA Compass Stadium; Attendance: 6,212; Referee: Rosendo Mendoza (Texas)

June 6	San Antonio FC (USL)	0–1	FC Dallas (MLS)	San Antonio, Texas
7:30 pm CDT		SAFC Report; FCD Report	Akindele 46'; Cannon (yellow card) 52'	Stadium: Toyota Field; Attendance: 6,224; Referee: Elton Garcia (Texas)

June 6	Real Salt Lake (MLS)	0–2	Sporting Kansas City (MLS)	Sandy, Utah
8:00 pm MDT	Herrera (yellow card) 28'; Ruíz (yellow card) 47'	Report	Russell 47'; Belmar 74'	Stadium: Rio Tinto Stadium; Attendance: 15,833; Referee: Malik Badawi (California)

June 6	Los Angeles FC (MLS)	2–0	Fresno FC (USL)	Los Angeles, California
7:00 pm PDT	Rossi 53'; Blessing 56'	LAFC Report; Fresno Report	Caffa (yellow card) 63'; Cazarez (yellow card) 80'	Stadium: Banc of California Stadium; Attendance: 7,500; Referee: Mark Allatin (California)

June 6	LA Galaxy (MLS)	3–1	FC Golden State Force (PDL)	Carson, California
7:30 pm PDT	Jamieson IV 15'; Lassiter 37', 85'; Requejo (yellow card) 39'; Pedro (yellow card) 65'; Klimenta (yellow card) 75'	LA Report	López (yellow card) 31'; Fonseca 48'; Oduro (yellow card) 54'	Stadium: StubHub Center Track & Field Stadium; Attendance: 2,626; Referee: Ramy Touchan (California)

June 6	Portland Timbers (MLS)	2–0	San Jose Earthquakes (MLS)	Portland, Oregon
7:30 pm PDT	Ebobisse 28'; Asprilla 66' (Chara)	Report	Alashe (yellow card) 41'; Ockford (yellow card) 54'	Stadium: Providence Park; Attendance: 12,769; Referee: Farhad Dadkho (Washington)

June 6	Sacramento Republic FC (USL)	2–1 (a.e.t.)	Seattle Sounders FC (MLS)	Sacramento, California
8:00 pm PDT	Iwasa 60'; Bijev (yellow card) 84'; Hall (yellow card) 85'; Matjašič 115'	Report	Chenkam (yellow card) 11'; Roldan (yellow card) 62'; Ele (yellow card) 81'; Shipp 90+1'; Olsen (yellow card) 110'	Stadium: Papa Murphy's Park; Attendance: 5,619; Referee: Joe Dickerson (California)

=== Round of 16 ===
Draw announced June 7.

June 15	Portland Timbers (MLS)	1–0	LA Galaxy (MLS)	Portland, Oregon
8:00 pm PDT	Blanco 30' (Adi); Asprilla (yellow card) 90+2'	Report	Kitchen (yellow card) 42'; Carrasco (yellow card) 62'	Stadium: Providence Park; Attendance: 14,556; Referee: Joe Dickerson (California)

June 16	Philadelphia Union (MLS)	2–1	New York Red Bulls (MLS)	Chester, Pennsylvania
7:00 pm EDT	Medunjanin 52' (Bedoya); Burke	Report	Wright-Phillips 77' (Kaku)	Stadium: Talen Energy Stadium; Attendance: 4,009; Referee: Jon Freemon (Kansas)

June 16	Sporting Kansas City (MLS)	3–2	FC Dallas (MLS)	Kansas City, Kansas
8:00 pm CDT	Sallói 66' (Kuzain); Amor (yellow card) 83'; Croizet 89'	Report	Gruezo 18' (Barrios); Lamah (yellow card) 20' (goal) 77'; Barrios (yellow card) 37'; Hayes (yellow card) 72'; Ulloa (yellow card) 74'	Stadium: Children's Mercy Park; Attendance: 15,238; Referee: Ramy Touchan (California)

June 18	Houston Dynamo (MLS)	1–0	Minnesota United FC (MLS)	Houston, Texas
7:30 pm CDT	Manotas 47' (Lundqvist); Fuenmayor (yellow card) 89'; Seitz (yellow card) 90'	Dynamo Report	Boxall (yellow card) 67'; Kallman (yellow card) 90+3'	Stadium: BBVA Compass Stadium; Attendance: 1,930; Referee: Guido Gonzales Jr.

June 20	D.C. United (MLS)	1–1 (a.e.t.) (2–4 p)	Orlando City SC (MLS)	Germantown, Maryland
7:00 pm EDT	Acosta 10' (Mattocks); Fisher (yellow card) 24'; Durkin (yellow card) 52' (yellow-red card) 99'	Report	Meram 17' (Kljestan); El-Munir (yellow card) 116'; Mueller (yellow card) 117'	Stadium: Maryland SoccerPlex; Attendance: 3,254; Referee: Marcos de Oliveira
	Penalties
	Asad (penalty missed); Acosta (penalty missed); Harkes (penalty scored); Mullins (penalty scored)		Johnson (penalty scored); Kljestan (penalty scored); Mueller (penalty scored); Villarreal (penalty missed); Colmán (penalty scored)

June 20	Louisville City FC (USL)	2–1	Nashville SC (USL)	Louisville, Kentucky
7:00 pm EDT	Craig; DelPiccolo (yellow card) 35' (goal) 58' (Davis IV); Ownby (yellow card) 52'	Report	LaGrassa 68'	Stadium: Lynn Stadium; Attendance: 4,463

June 20	Atlanta United FC (MLS)	0–1	Chicago Fire (MLS)	Atlanta, Georgia
7:30 pm EDT	González Pírez (yellow card) 81'	Report	Katai (yellow card) 39'; Nikolic	Stadium: Mercedes-Benz Stadium; Attendance: 41,012; Referee: Rubiel Vazquez

June 20	Los Angeles FC (MLS)	3–2	Sacramento Republic FC (USL)	Los Angeles, California
7:30 pm PDT	Feilhaber 58' (Atuesta); Rossi 67' (Nguyen); Blessing	Report	Rodriguez (yellow card) 18'; Hord 35'; Gomez (yellow card) 45+2'; Bijev 60' (Villarreal); Matjasic (yellow card) 66'	Stadium: Banc of California Stadium; Attendance: 8,750; Referee: Nima Saghafi

=== Quarterfinals ===
Draw announced June 7.

July 18	Philadelphia Union (MLS)	1–0	Orlando City SC (MLS)	Chester, Pennsylvania
7:00 pm EDT	Bedoya 4'	Union Report; Orlando Report	Toia (yellow card) 85'; Johnson (yellow card) 90+1'	Stadium: Talen Energy Stadium; Attendance: 7,176; Referee: Rubiel Vazquez

July 18	Chicago Fire (MLS)	4–0	Louisville City FC (USL)	Bridgeview, Illinois
7:30 pm CDT	Nikolić 16' (Katai); Katai 32' (Schweinsteiger); Collier (yellow card) 86' (goal) 90+2' (Corrales); Campos 90'	Fire Report; Louisville Report	Craig (yellow card) 62'; DelPiccolo (yellow card) 64'; Smith (red card) 84'; Totsch (yellow card) 89'; Rasmussen (red card) 90+3'	Stadium: Toyota Park; Attendance: 3,322; Referee: Nima Saghafi

July 18	Houston Dynamo (MLS)	4–2	Sporting Kansas City (MLS)	Houston, Texas
7:30 pm CDT	Quioto (yellow card) 26' (goal) 35', 66' (Cerén); Boniek García (yellow card) 45'; Manotas 69', 88' (Rodriguez); Fuenmayor (yellow card) 79'	Dynamo Report; Sporting KC Report	Russell 2'; Croizet 90+3'	Stadium: BBVA Compass Stadium; Attendance: 6,431; Referee: Allen Chapman

July 18	Los Angeles FC (MLS)	3–2	Portland Timbers (MLS)	Los Angeles, California
7:30 pm PDT	Harvey (yellow card) 10'; Guzmán 30' (o.g.); Vela 38' (Zimmerman); Ureña 51' (Harvey); Nguyen (yellow card) 58'	LAFC Report; Timbers Report	Andriuškevičius (yellow card) 31' (goal) 52' (Asprilla); Blanco (yellow card) 44'; Cascante 45+2' (Guzmán) (yellow card) 90+3'; Valentin (yellow card) 67'; Guzmán (yellow card) 83'	Stadium: Banc of California Stadium; Attendance: 17,898; Referee: Ramy Touchan

=== Semifinals ===
Draw announced July 23.

August 8	Philadelphia Union (MLS)	3–0	Chicago Fire (MLS)	Chester, Pennsylvania
7:00 pm EDT	Burke 59', 77'; Sapong 86'	Report		Stadium: Talen Energy Stadium; Attendance: 7,934; Referee: Ramy Touchan

August 8	Houston Dynamo (MLS)	3–3 (a.e.t.) (7–6 p)	Los Angeles FC (MLS)	Houston, Texas
7:30 pm CDT	Wenger 12'; Manotas 25'; Rodríguez 75'	Report	Rossi 6', 78', 90+5'	Stadium: BBVA Compass Stadium; Attendance: 7,581; Referee: Rubiel Vazquez
	Penalties
	Cerén (penalty scored); Rodríguez (penalty scored); Elis (penalty scored); García (penalty missed); Martínez (penalty scored); Gil (penalty scored); Wenger (penalty scored); Senderos (penalty scored)		(penalty scored) Beitashour; (penalty scored) Kovar; (penalty scored) Horta; (penalty scored) Vela; (penalty missed) Ciman; (penalty scored) Harvey; (penalty scored) Rossi; (penalty missed) Blessing

=== Final ===
September 26, 2018
19:00 CDT

Houston Dynamo	3–0	Philadelphia Union
Manotas 4', 25'; Trusty 65' (o.g.)	Report

BBVA Compass Stadium, Houston, Texas
Attendance: 16,060
Referee: Nima Saghafi

== Top goalscorers ==
Team eliminated for this round.

Rank	Player	Team	Goals	By round								
Rank	Player	Team	Goals	PL	1R	2R	3R	4R	R16	QF	SF	F
1	(Colombia) Mauro Manotas	Houston Dynamo	6						1	2	1	2
2	(Colombia) David Ochoa	Miami United FC	5		3	2						
2	(Uruguay) Diego Rossi	Los Angeles FC	5					1	1		3	
4	(United States) Cesar Castillo	FC Denver	4		3	1						
4	(Brazil) Allisson Faramilio	FC Golden State Force	4		1	1	2					
4	(Hungary) Nemanja Nikolić	Chicago Fire	4					2	1	1		
4	(United States) Christian Okeke	NTX Rayados	4		1	2	1					
8	(England) Chuka Aruh	Inter Nashville FC	3		3							
8	(Jamaica) Cory Burke	Philadelphia Union	3						1		2	
8	(United States) Dilly Duka	FC Motown	3		2	1						
8	(Netherlands) Jerry van Ewijk	Reno 1868	3			3						
8	(Netherlands) Marios Lomis	North Carolina FC	3			1	1	1				
8	(Portugal) Ricardo Ramos	Duluth FC	3		3							
8	(United States) Memo Rodríguez	Houston Dynamo	3					2			1	
8	(Guyana) Emery Welshman	FC Cincinnati	3			3						
