= American Premier Soccer League (2015–2018) =

Former soccer league

- Founded: 2015; 11 years ago
- First season: 2015
- Folded: 2019; 7 years ago
- Country: United States
- Confederation: CONCACAF (North American Football Union)
- Number of clubs: 10
- Domestic cup: U.S. Open Cup
- International cup: CONCACAF Champions League
- Last champions: Red Force FC
- Most championships: Boca Raton FC (4 titles)
- Website: apslsoccer.com

The American Premier Soccer League (APSL) was a soccer league sanctioned by the United States Adult Soccer Association (USASA) with teams primarily in Southern Florida.

== Competition format ==
The official regular season ran from January through September. For the playoffs, the four top seeded teams faced each other in semifinal games with championship being decided between the two winners. The APSL also organized a Fall Season that ran from September to December.

== Organization ==
The APSL was organized in a mostly decentralized structure and was managed as a team-run league. Each year the member clubs helped elect a Commissioner, Treasurer and Secretary. Each team was individually owned and operated, and was responsible for maintaining league minimum standards. New teams seeking membership into the league were subject to approval from an executive committee of existing team owners. Member clubs had the right to make localized decisions for their respective markets, conferences and regions based on what they believed was best for their particular region.

== Teams ==
APSL Teams
Team	City	Stadium	Founded	First season	Head coach
Boca Raton FC	Boca Raton, Florida	Atlantic High School	2015	2015	(United States) Jim Rooney
South Florida FC	Pembroke Pines, FL	Broward College Stadium	2010	2015	(Colombia) Norberto (Bert) N. Mahecha
FC Kendall	Kendall, FL	Tropical Park Stadium	2008	2015	(Uruguay) Mauro Grignola
Red Force FC	Kendall, FL	Tropical Park Stadium	2009	2015	(Argentina) Gabriel Vega
Deerfield Beach Heights FC	Deerfield Beach, FL	Somerset Academy	2018	2018	
Palm Beach Spartans	Delray Beach, FL	Boynton Beach HS	2011	2018	Cheddi Johnson
UD Miami	Miami, FL	Tropical Park Stadium	2017	2017	

=== Former teams ===
- Alianza Miami FC
- Duluth FC
- Elite Soccer Academy
- Estudiantes del Guayas
- Fargo FC
- Granite City FC
- Hurricanes FC
- Miami Dade FC
- Miami Fusion FC
- Miami Nacional SC
- Miami Storm FC
- Miami United
- Minneapolis FC
- MV Twinstars Reserves
- Olympiakos APL
- Palm Beach Piranhas FC
- Real Miami FC

== Champions ==
Season	Winner	Runner-up	Result
2015	Boca Raton FC	Uruguay Kendall FC	1-0
2015 Fall	Boca Raton FC	Alianza Miami FC	2-0
2016	Boca Raton FC	Uruguay Kendall FC	2-1
2016 Fall	Boca Raton FC	Red Force FC	2-1
2017	Miami Dade FC	South Florida FC	3-1
2017 Fall	FC Kendall	South Florida FC	3-0
2018	Red Force FC	FC Kendall	3-1
2018 Fall	Tournament forgone		

== Executive Board of Directors ==
APSL Board
	Name
President / Commissioner	Norberto (Bert) N. Mahecha
COO	Gabriel Vega
CFO	Mauro Grignola
Secretary	Pedro Heizer

== See also ==
- North American Soccer League
- United Soccer League
- USL Premier Development League
- National Premier Soccer League
- United Premier Soccer League
