= 2018 U.S. Open Cup qualification =

2018 Lamar Hunt U.S. Open Cup qualification
Tournament details
- Dates: September 23, 2017 – November 19, 2017
- Teams: 108

The 2018 Lamar Hunt U.S. Open Cup tournament proper will feature teams from all five tiers of the men's American soccer pyramid. A record 108 open division amateur teams have entered qualifying this year.

US Soccer oversaw the qualifying process that was formerly handled by each association. All teams within the Division I and II professional leagues qualified automatically as in past years. Any open division national league could use its previous year's league standings as its qualification method. Remaining open division teams participated in qualifying rounds to determine entrants into the tournament proper. Final slot allocation was determined when team registration concluded.

== National league track ==
=== Premier Development League ===
On March 14, 2018, it was announced that 20 PDL teams would be participating in the 2018 U.S. Open Cup. The teams are

Charlotte Eagles, FC Golden State Force, FC Miami City, FC Tucson, Lakeland Tropics, Long Island Rough Riders, Michigan Bucks, Mississippi Brilla, Myrtle Beach Mutiny, New York Red Bulls U-23, Ocean City Nor'easters, OKC Energy U23, Portland Timbers U23, Reading United A.C., San Francisco City FC, Seacoast United Phantoms, SIMA Aguilas, South Georgia Tormenta FC, The Villages SC, Western Mass Pioneers

=== National Premier Soccer League ===
On March 14, 2018, it was announced that 19 NPSL teams would be participating in the 2018 U.S. Open Cup. The teams are

AFC Ann Arbor, Brooklyn Italians, CD Aguiluchos USA, Dakota Fusion FC, Detroit City FC, Duluth FC, Elm City Express, Erie Commodores FC, FC Arizona, FC Motown, FC Wichita, Fort Worth Vaqueros FC, Inter Nashville FC, Kingston Stockade FC, Kitsap Pumas, Miami United FC, Midland-Odessa FC, New Orleans Jesters, Orange County FC

== Local qualifying track ==
All qualifying matches took place in 2017.

=== First qualifying round ===
==== Northeast Region ====
Carpathia FC (Michigan)	Forfeit; 0–1	(Michigan) Ann Arbor FC

Santa Fe Wanderers KC (Kansas)	Forfeit; 0–1	(Minnesota) Stegman's Soccer Club

Aurora Borealis Soccer Club (Illinois)	Forfeit; 1–0	(Wisconsin) United Serbian Soccer Club

September 23	Unations FC (Massachusetts)	1–5	(Massachusetts) Safira FC	Worcester, Massachusetts
10:00 EDT				Stadium: Burncoat High School

September 23	Kendall Wanderers (Massachusetts)	5–2	(Massachusetts) Boston Siege FC	Cambridge, Massachusetts
14:00 EDT				Stadium: Danehy Park

September 23	Lynn United (Massachusetts)	3–8	(Massachusetts) GPS Omens	Lynn, Massachusetts
15:00 EDT				Stadium: Manning Stadium

September 23	Southie FC (Massachusetts)	3–3 (a.e.t.) (3–4 p)	(Massachusetts) Mass United FC	Medford, Massachusetts
16:00 EDT				Stadium: Medford High School

September 23	Salone FC (Pennsylvania)	1–3	(Pennsylvania) Junior Lone Star FC U23s	West Chester, Pennsylvania
16:30 EDT				Stadium: West Chester United Turf Field

September 23	West Chester United SC (Pennsylvania)	4–2	(Pennsylvania) Junior Lone Star FC	West Chester, Pennsylvania
19:30 ET				Stadium: West Chester United Turf Field

September 24	New York Pancyprian-Freedoms (New York (state))	2–1	(Connecticut) Newtown Pride FC	Jamaica, New York
12:00 EDT				Stadium: Belson Stadium

September 24	NLS Graduates (Maryland)	1–3 (a.e.t.)	(Maryland) Izee Auto FC	Baltimore, Maryland
13:00 EDT				Stadium: Banner Field at Latrobe Park

September 24	Christos FC (Maryland)	3–0	(Maryland) Aegean Hawks	Elkridge, Maryland
13:00 PDT				Stadium: Troy Park - Field 4

September 24	Phoenix SC (Pennsylvania)	3–0	(Pennsylvania) Upper Darby FC	Trevose, Pennsylvania
14:30 EDT				Stadium: Phoenix Sports Club

September 24	Vereinigung Erzgebirge (Pennsylvania)	1–2 (a.e.t.)	(Pennsylvania) United German Hungarians	Warminster, Pennsylvania
16:00 EDT				Stadium: Vereinigung Erzgebirge Clubhouse

September 24	Tartan Devils Oak Avalon (Pennsylvania)	1–2	(New York (state)) Rochester River Dogz	Pittsburgh, Pennsylvania
16:00 EDT				Stadium: Arthur J. Rooney Athletic Field

September 24	Jackson Lions FC (New Jersey)	1–2	(New York (state)) Lansdowne Bhoys FC	Jackson, New Jersey
19:30 EDT				Stadium: Jackson Justice Complex

==== Southeast Region ====
Byes: (Louisiana) Cajun Soccer Club, (Tennessee) Nashville United

Miami Wolves FC (Florida)	Forfeit; 0–1	(Florida) Miami Nacional SC

September 23	Majestic Soccer Club (Georgia (U.S. state))	2–0	(South Carolina) Lowcountry United	Marietta, Georgia
15:30 EDT				Stadium: Atlanta United Training Ground

September 23	Central Texas Lobos	0–2	(Texas) NTX Rayados	Kyle, Texas
17:00 CDT				Stadium: Gregg-Clarke Park

September 23	Austin Real Cuauhtemoc (Texas)	2–3	(Texas) Celtic Cowboys Premier	Georgetown, Texas
18:00 CDT				Stadium: McMasters Athletic Complex

September 23	Hurricane FC (Florida)	3–4	(Florida) Boca Raton FC	Delray Beach, Florida
19:30 EDT				Stadium: Seacrest Soccer Complex - Field 1

September 24	FC Ginga (Florida)	1–8	(Florida) Red Force FC	Miami Shores, Florida
10:00 EDT				Stadium: Barry University

September 24	South Florida FC	3–1	(Florida) Miami United FC U23	Cooper City, Florida
17:00 EDT				Stadium: Brian Piccolo Park

September 24	Orlando Storm (Florida)	0–0 (a.e.t.) (4–3 p)	(Florida) Inter United AC	Orlando, Florida
19:00 EDT				Stadium: UCF Soccer and Track Stadium

September 24	Gaffa FC (Mississippi)	1–4	(Louisiana) Motagua New Orleans	Ridgeland, Mississippi
18:00 CDT				Stadium: Freedom Ridge Stadium

September 24	Leu Blacks FC (Florida)	0–11	(Florida) FC Kendall	Hialeah, Florida
20:00 EDT				Stadium: Amelia Earhart Park Field 5

==== Mountain Region ====
Byes: (Arizona) Galati FC, (Arizona) Sporting AZ FC

September 23	Gam United FC (Colorado)	0–3	(Colorado) FC Denver	Aurora, Colorado
16:30 MDT				Stadium: Aurora Public Schools Stadium

September 23	Azteca FC (Colorado)	2–0	(Colorado) Denver Metro FC	Aurora, Colorado
19:00 MDT				Stadium: Aurora Public Schools Stadium

September 23	Chiapas FC (Arizona)	0–9	(Arizona) Inter EmpireWorks FC	Phoenix, Arizona
20:00 MST				Stadium: Desert West Sports Complex - Field 1

September 23	Ojuelos Jalisco (Arizona)	4–0	(Arizona) Allstars SC	Phoenix, Arizona
20:00 MST				Stadium: Desert West Sports Complex - Synthetic Field

September 24	FC Boulder (Colorado)	2–2 (a.e.t.) (5–6 p)	(Colorado) Harpo's FC	Boulder, Colorado
15:00 MDT				Stadium: Fairview High School

September 24	Indios Denver FC (Colorado)	6–2	(Colorado) FC Union Jerez	Englewood, Colorado
15:45 MDT				Stadium: Englewood High School Stadium

September 24	Colorado Springs FC	2–0	Colorado Rovers	Colorado Springs, Colorado
16:30 MDT				Stadium: Grace Center for Athletics

September 24	Colorado Rush	2–1 (a.e.t.)	(Colorado) Club El Azul	Highlands Ranch, Colorado
17:00 MDT				Stadium: Shea Stadium

September 24	Fort Collins United (Colorado)	5–1	(Colorado) FC Greeley	Loveland, Colorado
19:30 MDT				Stadium: Loveland Sports Park

==== Pacific Region ====
Valley United SC (California)	Forfeit; 1–0	(California) Los Angeles SC

September 23	Davis Legacy SC (California)	2–0	Western Nevada Futbol Club	Davis, California
17:00 PDT				Stadium: Davis Legacy Soccer Complex

September 23	Academica Soccer Club (California)	1–0	(California) Oakland Pamperos	Turlock, California
19:00 PDT				Stadium: Academica Fields

September 23	Dynamos FC (California)	0–3	(California) El Farolito Soccer Club	San Ramon, California
19:00 PDT				Stadium: Dougherty Valley High School

September 23	Las Vegas Mobsters (Nevada)	3–2	(California) Pacific Side FC	Las Vegas, Nevada
19:00 PDT				Stadium: Kellogg-Zaher Soccer Complex

September 23	Santa Ana Winds FC (California)	5–2	(California) Outbreak FC	Lake Forest, California
19:00 PDT		Report		Stadium: Lake Forest Sports Park

September 23	IPS/Marathon Taverna (Oregon)	3–2 (a.e.t.)	(Idaho) Boise FC Cutthroats	Portland, Oregon
19:00 PDT				Stadium: Rob Strasser Memorial Field

September 23	Bell Gardens FC (California)	0–5	(California) La Máquina FC	Bell Gardens, California
19:30 PDT				Stadium: John Anson Ford Park

September 23	Real San Jose (California)	2–3	(California) Cal Victory FC	San Jose, California
19:30 PDT				Stadium: PAL Stadium

September 23	Vanquish FC (California)	3–2 (a.e.t.)	(California) C.F. Cachorros USA	Irvine, California
20:00 PDT				Stadium: Orange County Great Park, Main Stadium

September 24	Buena Park FC (California)	3–0	(California) Newport FC	La Palma, California
15:00 PDT				Stadium: John F. Kennedy High School

September 24	SFV Scorpions (California)	3–1	(California) AC Brea Steaua	Mission Hills, California
16:00 PDT				Stadium: Bishop Alemany High School

September 24	Newcastle United FC (California)	13–0	(California) Del Rey City SC	Norco, California
17:00 PDT				Stadium: SilverLakes Sports Complex

September 24	UFA Hawks L.A. (California)	0–5	(California) Santa Clarita Storm	Los Angeles, California
17:10 PDT				Stadium: Los Angeles City College

September 24	San Pedro Monsters FC (California)	4–0	(California) Fontana International SC	Wilmington, California
18:30 PDT				Stadium: Phineas Banning High School Stadium

September 24	Strikers FC South Coast (California)	1–5	(California) Chula Vista FC	Lake Forest, California
19:00 PDT				Stadium: Lake Forest Sports Park

September 24	L.A. Wolves FC (California)	6–1	(California) Real Sociedad Royals	Bell Gardens, California
19:30 PDT				Stadium: John Anson Ford Park

=== Second qualifying round ===
==== Northeast Region ====
Rochester River Dogz (New York (state))	Forfeit; 1–0	(Michigan) Ann Arbor FC	Spencerport, New York
			Stadium: Doug Miller Family Sports Park

October 21	GPS Omens (Massachusetts)	2–2 (a.e.t.) (4–5 p)	(Massachusetts) Kendall Wanderers	Marlborough, Massachusetts
10:00 EDT				Stadium: Hillside School Field

October 21	Mass United FC (Massachusetts)	2–0	(Massachusetts) Safira FC	Medford, Massachusetts
19:00 EDT				Stadium: Hormel Stadium

October 21	West Chester United SC (Pennsylvania)	0–1	(Pennsylvania) Phoenix SC	West Chester, Pennsylvania
19:30 EDT				Stadium: West Chester United Turf Field

October 22	New York Pancyprian-Freedoms (New York (state))	0–0 (a.e.t.) (4–5 p)	(New York (state)) Lansdowne Bhoys FC	Jamaica, New York
14:00 EDT				Stadium: Belson Stadium

October 22	Christos FC (Maryland)	1–0 (a.e.t.)	(Maryland) Izee Auto FC	Arnold, Maryland
15:00 EDT				Stadium: Anne Arundel Community College

October 22	United German Hungarians (Pennsylvania)	2–3	(Pennsylvania) Junior Lone Star FC U23s	Oakford, Pennsylvania
15:00 EDT				Stadium: United German Hungarian Club

October 22	Aurora Borealis Soccer Club (Illinois)	2–3 (a.e.t.)	(Minnesota) Stegman's Soccer Club
15:00 CDT

==== Southeast Region ====
October 21	Celtic Cowboys Premier (Texas)	1–4	(Texas) NTX Rayados	Austin, Texas
15:30 CDT				Stadium: Onion Creek Soccer Complex

October 22^{a}	Miami Nacional SC (Florida)	0–5	(Florida) Red Force FC	Miami, Florida
15:00 EDT				Stadium: Ives Estates Park

October 22	Nashville United Majestic Soccer Club (Tennessee)	3–0	(Georgia (U.S. state)) Majestic Soccer Club	Murfreesboro, Tennessee
15:30 CDT				Stadium: Richard Siegel Soccer Park - Stadium Field

October 22	South Florida FC	5–1	(Florida) Boca Raton FC	Cooper City, Florida
17:00 EDT				Stadium: Brian Piccolo Park

October 22	Cajun Soccer Club (Louisiana)	1–3	(Louisiana) Motagua New Orleans	Lafayette, Louisiana
17:00 CDT				Stadium: Moore Park

October 22	Orlando Storm (Florida)	0–4	(Florida) FC Kendall	Auburndale, Florida
19:00 EDT				Stadium: Lake Myrtle Sports Complex

^a Miami Nacional SC conceded the game at halftime.

==== Mountain Region ====
October 21	Azteca FC (Colorado)	3–2	Colorado Rush	Aurora, Colorado
17:00 MDT				Stadium: Aurora Public Schools Stadium

October 21	FC Denver (Colorado)	1–0	(Colorado) Fort Collins United	Aurora, Colorado
18:30 MDT				Stadium: Aurora Sports Park

October 21	Ojuelos Jalisco (Arizona)	1–6	(Arizona) Galati FC	Phoenix, Arizona
20:00 MST				Stadium: Desert West Sports Complex

October 21	Sporting AZ FC (Arizona)	3–1	(Arizona) Inter EmpireWorks FC	Scottsdale, Arizona
20:00 MST				Stadium: Phoenix Rising Soccer Complex

October 22	Colorado Springs FC	1–2 (a.e.t.)	(Colorado) Harpo's FC	Colorado Springs, Colorado
15:00 MDT				Stadium: Grace Center for Athletics

October 22	Indios Denver FC (Colorado)	4–2	(Oregon) IPS/Marathon Taverna	Englewood, Colorado
15:45 MDT				Stadium: Englewood High School Stadium

==== Pacific Region ====
L.A. Wolves FC (California)	Forfeit; 1–0	(California) Vanquish FC

La Máquina FC (California)	Forfeit; 1–0	(Nevada) Las Vegas Mobsters

October 21	Valley United SC (California)	0–1	(California) Chula Vista FC	North Hills, California
17:30 PDT				Stadium: Heritage High school

October 21	San Pedro Monsters FC (California)	4–0	(California) SFV Scorpions	Wilmington, California
18:45 PDT				Stadium: Phineas Banning High School Stadium

October 21	Santa Ana Winds FC (California)	6–0	(California) Newcastle United FC	Lake Forest, California
19:00 PDT				Stadium: Lake Forest Sports Park

October 22	El Farolito Soccer Club (California)	5–0	(California) Academica Soccer Club	San Francisco, California
11:15 PDT				Stadium: Boxer Stadium

October 22	Buena Park FC (California)	3–1	(California) Santa Clarita Storm	La Palma, California
15:00 PDT				Stadium: John F. Kennedy High School

October 22	Cal Victory FC (California)	4–2	(California) Davis Legacy SC	Petaluma, California
17:00 PDT				Stadium: Casa Grande High School

=== Third qualifying round ===
==== Northeast Region ====
November 18	Mass United FC (Massachusetts)	1–2	(Massachusetts) Kendall Wanderers	Somerville, Massachusetts
19:15 EST				Stadium: Dilboy Stadium

November 18	Lansdowne Bhoys FC (New York (state))	3–1	(Pennsylvania) Junior Lone Star FC U23s	Yonkers, New York
20:00 EST				Stadium: Tibbetts Brooke Park

November 19	Rochester River Dogz (New York (state))	2–1	(Minnesota) Stegman's Soccer Club	Pittsford, New York
13:00 EST				Stadium: Thornell Farm Park Turf Field

November 19	Christos FC (Maryland)	5–1	(Pennsylvania) Phoenix SC	Arnold, Maryland
13:00 EST				Stadium: Anne Arundel Community College

==== Southeast Region ====
November 18	Nashville United Majestic Soccer Club (Tennessee)	2–4	(Florida) FC Kendall	Nashville, Tennessee
18:00 CST				Stadium: E. S. Rose Park

November 18	NTX Rayados (Texas)	2–1	(Louisiana) Motagua New Orleans	Balch Springs, Texas
19:00 CST				Stadium: Premier Park

November 19	Red Force FC (Florida)	2–1 (a.e.t.)	South Florida FC	Miami, Florida
18:30 EST				Stadium: Kendall Soccer Park

==== Mountain Region ====
November 18	FC Denver (Colorado)	2–0 (a.e.t.)	(Colorado) Indios Denver FC	Aurora, Colorado
14:30 MST				Stadium: Aurora Sports Park

November 18	Harpo's FC (Colorado)	3–4	(Colorado) Azteca FC	Broomfield, Colorado
15:00 MST				Stadium: Broomfield County Commons Park

November 18	Sporting AZ FC (Arizona)	6–1	(Arizona) Galati FC	Chandler, Arizona
19:00 MST				Stadium: Chandler-Gilbert Community College

==== Pacific Region ====
November 18	Santa Ana Winds FC (California)	4–1	(California) San Pedro Monsters FC	Lake Forest, California
19:00 PST				Stadium: Lake Forest Sports Park

November 19	Chula Vista FC (California)	1–4	(California) La Máquina FC	Chula Vista, California
14:00 PST				Stadium: Chula Vista Elite Training Center

November 19	El Farolito Soccer Club (California) ^{b}	8–0	(California) Cal Victory FC	San Francisco, California
11:15 PST				Stadium: Boxer Stadium

November 19	Buena Park FC (California)	0–4	(California) L.A. Wolves FC	La Palma, California
15:00 PST				Stadium: John F. Kennedy High School

^b El Farolito joined the National Premier Soccer League (NPSL) as an expansion team on November 20, 2017. Clubs must remain playing members in good standing within their leagues from the date of the open division entry deadline through the date of the U.S. Open Cup Final in order to be eligible to compete in the U.S. Open Cup. Since El Farolito left the San Francisco Soccer Football League to join the NPSL, the club became ineligible for the 2018 U.S. Open Cup.
