= Thomas Peers =

Thomas Peers may refer to:

- Thomas Peers, American footballer (soccer), see 2018 U.S. Open Cup
- Tom Peers (born 1995), English footballer, see 2019–20 National League
