= 2016 U.S. Open Cup qualification =

2016 Lamar Hunt U.S. Open Cup qualification
Tournament details
- Dates: 17 October 2015 – 22 November 2015
- Teams: 56

The 2016 Lamar Hunt U.S. Open Cup tournament proper will feature teams from all five tiers of men's soccer of the American Soccer Pyramid.

Starting with the 2016 tournament, US Soccer took over the qualifying process that used to be handled by each association. According to US Soccer, all teams within the Division I, II, & III professional leagues will qualify automatically as in past years. Any national league not in the top three divisions can apply to use previous year's league standings as their qualification method. Remaining teams will participate in up to five qualifying rounds to determine entrants into the tournament proper. In prior years, slots were allocated and the individual associations created tournaments and qualifiers to determine their representatives. Final slot allocation will be determined when team registration has concluded.

As of September 8, 2015, US Soccer has made the decision to ban all lower division teams that are majority owned by a higher division team. This means Bethlehem Steel, LA Galaxy 2, New York Red Bulls 2, Orlando City B, Portland Timbers 2, Real Monarchs, Seattle Sounders 2, and Swope Park Rangers (all from the United Soccer League) will not qualify for the 2016 tournament. On November 5, 2015, New York Cosmos Chief Operating Officer Erik Stover stated that eligible New York Cosmos B would not enter as "the integrity of the tournament is more important". Just before the tournament, USL side Rio Grande Valley FC Toros and their MLS parent Houston Dynamo asked that RGVFC be banned from the tournament by US Soccer. While RGVFC is not owned by the Dynamo, the MLS side staffs and coaches the Toros.

== Local Qualifying Track (56) ==
=== First qualifying round ===
October 17	Battery Park Gunners	0–2	Southie FC	Roxbury, Massachusetts
12:00 ET				Stadium: Madison Park High School

October 17	Vereinigung Erzgebirge	0–1	Salone FC	Warminster, Pennsylvania
14:00 ET				Stadium: Vereinigung Erzgebirge

October 17	Aromas Café FC	3–1	Tartan Devils Oak Avalon	Charlottesville, Virginia
15:00 ET				Stadium: South Fork Soccer Park

October 17	Junior Lone Star FC	1–2 (a.e.t.)	West Chester United	Wayne, Pennsylvania
18:30 ET				Stadium: YSC Sports Field

October 17	Jersey Shore Boca	2–1	South Jersey Elite Barons	Brick, New Jersey
19:00 ET				Stadium: Pinewood Park

October 17	Lansdowne Bhoys FC	3–0	Newtown Pride FC	Bronx, New York
19:30 ET				Stadium: Gaelic Park

October 18	Boston Olympiakos FC	0–5	Global Premier Soccer Omens	West Roxbury, Massachusetts
14:00 ET				Stadium: West Roxbury High School

October 18	Aegean Hawks	2–1 (a.e.t.)	Maryland Bays	Boyds, Maryland
14:30 ET				Stadium: Maryland SoccerPlex

October 18	New York Greek Americans SC	2–4 (a.e.t.)	New York Pancyprian-Freedoms	Maspeth, New York
18:00 ET				Stadium: Metropolitan Oval

October 18	Worcester FC	2–0	Newport FC	Worcester, Massachusetts
19:30 ET				Stadium: Foley Stadium

October 24	Harpo's FC	4–1	Colorado Rovers S.C.	Commerce City, Colorado
16:30 MT				Stadium: Dick's Sporting Goods Park, Field 8 Referee: Karen Abt

October 24	Strikers FC South Coast	2–3	La Máquina FC	Lake Forest, California
18:00 PT				Stadium: Lake Forest Sports Park and Recreation Center

Forfeit	International Portland Select	1–0	KC Athletics

October 24	Corinthians USA	0–2	San Nicolas FC	Rialto, California
19:00 PT				Stadium: Rialto High School

October 24	San Pedro Monsters FC	9–0	Footballers Academy	San Pedro, California
19:00 PT				Stadium: Daniel's Field

October 24	L.A. Wolves FC	3–1	Del Rey City SC	Torrance, California
20:00 PT				Stadium: Toyota Sports Complex

Forfeit	Motagua New Orleans	1–0	Tobacco Road FC

October 25	San Francisco City FC	2–0	El Farolito	San Francisco, California
15:00 PT				Stadium: Kezar Stadium

October 25	Real Miami Club of Football	1–2 (a.e.t.)	Boca Raton Football Club	Miami, Florida
16:30 ET				Stadium: St. John Bosco Football Stadium

October 25	FC Boulder	2–5	Colorado Rush	Boulder, Colorado
15:00 MT				Stadium: Pleasant View Soccer Complex

October 25	Buena Park FC	1–5	Outbreak FC	La Palma, California
15:00 PT				Stadium: John F. Kennedy High School

October 25	Queen City United FC	4–1	Charlotte Sporting Soccer Academy FC	Charlotte, North Carolina
19:00 ET				Stadium: West Mecklenburg Stadium

October 25	Ozzy's Laguna FC	2–2 (a.e.t.) (1–4 p)	Real Sociedad	Monterey Park, California
16:00 PT				Stadium: East Los Angeles College

October 25	Uruguay Kendall FC	3–0	Red Force FC	Pembroke Pines, Florida
20:00 ET				Stadium: Broward College - South Campus

October 25	IFX Ballistic	0–1	Davis Legacy	Livermore, California
17:00 PT				Stadium: Las Positas College

October 25	Cal FC	4–0	Valley United SC	Agoura Hills, California
19:00 PT				Stadium: Agoura High School

October 25	Temecula FC	2–5	Chula Vista FC	Temecula, California
19:00 PT				Stadium: Linfield Christian School

October 31	Austin Real Cuauhtemoc	2–4	NTX Rayados	Georgetown, Texas
				Stadium: McMasters Athletic Complex, Field B

=== Second qualifying round ===
November 14	New York Pancyprian-Freedoms	2–1	Jersey Shore Boca	New York, New York
19:00 ET				Stadium: Randall's Island Wards Meadow Fields #75

November 14	Worcester FC	0–5	Lansdowne Bhoys FC	Worcester, Massachusetts
19:15 ET				Stadium: Foley Stadium

November 15	Aromas Café FC	3–1	Aegean Hawks	Charlottesville, Virginia
15:00 ET				Stadium: Charlottesville High School

November 15	Southie FC	4–0	Global Premier Soccer Omens	Lawrence, Massachusetts
16:00 ET				Stadium: Veterans Memorial Stadium

November 15	West Chester United	3–0	Salone FC	West Chester, Pennsylvania
17:00 ET				Stadium: West Chester United Turf Field

November 21	Motagua New Orleans	5–2	Queen City United FC	New Orleans, Louisiana
19:00 CT				Stadium: Pan American Stadium

November 21	Chula Vista FC	0–4	La Maquina	Chula Vista, California
18:00 PT				Stadium: Stan Canaris Stadium

November 21	L.A. Wolves FC	2–1	Cal FC	Torrance, California
19:30 PT				Stadium: Toyota Sports Complex, Field 1

November 22	Uruguay Kendall FC	1–1 (a.e.t.) (4–5 p)	Boca Raton Football Club	Pembroke Pines, Florida
15:30 ET				Stadium: Broward College – South Campus

November 22	Harpo's FC	3–1	Colorado Rush	Commerce City, Colorado
14:00 MT				Stadium: Dick's Sporting Goods Park, Field 8

November 22	San Francisco City FC	4–3	Davis Legacy	San Francisco, California
14:00 PT				Stadium: Kezar Stadium; Attendance: 862

Forfeit	NTX Rayados	1–0	International Portland Select	Dallas, Texas
				Stadium: Richland Community College

November 22	Real Sociedad	0–3	San Nicolas FC	Bellflower, California
16:30 PT				Stadium: St. John Bosco High School

November 22	San Pedro Monsters FC	3–4 (a.e.t.)	Outbreak FC	Torrance, California
19:30 PT				Stadium: Toyota Sports Complex, Field 2

=== Third qualifying round ===
On February 3, teams scheduled for the Third Qualifying Round received letters from USSF advising them that due to the withdrawal of some professional teams (the USL clubs mentioned above), the round was cancelled and all twelve teams had qualified for the First Round of the main tournament along with the two teams who had received prior byes.

Teams scheduled to receive byes to the First Round

- San Francisco City FC
- Harpo's FC

Teams scheduled to play in the Third Qualifying Round before cancellation

- West Chester United
- Southie FC
- Lansdowne Bhoys FC
- New York Pancyprian-Freedoms
- Motagua New Orleans
- NTX Rayados
- La Maquina
- Outbreak FC
- L.A. Wolves FC
- San Nicolas FC
- Aromas Café FC
- Boca Raton Football Club

== National League Track ==
=== Premier Development League (15) ===
On September 16, 2015, US Soccer announced the 15 PDL sides for the US Open Cup listed below. 2015 league results were used to determine the qualifying teams.

- Kitsap Pumas (Northwest Division Winner) (Granted bye to Second Round due to late withdrawal of Rio Grande Valley FC)
- Burlingame Dragons FC (Southwest Division Winner)
- Charlotte Eagles (South Atlantic Division Winner)
- Des Moines Menace (Heartland Division Winner)
- FC Tucson (Mountain Division Winner)
- GPS Portland Phoenix (Northeast Division Winner)
- Michigan Bucks (Great Lakes Division Winner)
- Mississippi Brilla (Mid South Division Winner)
- New York Red Bulls U-23 (Mid Atlantic Division Winner)
- Ocala Stampede (Southeast Division Winner)
- Jersey Express (at-large Berth)
- Long Island Rough Riders (at-large Berth)
- Reading United (at-large Berth)
- Seacoast United Phantoms (at-large Berth)
- Ventura County Fusion (at-large Berth)

=== National Premier Soccer League (13) ===
On September 13, 2015, the NPSL announced the 13 NPSL sides for the US Open Cup listed below. Detroit City was added later as a late addition at-large berth due to the withdrawal of New York Cosmos B. 2015 league results were used to determine the qualifying teams.

- New York Cosmos B (Championship Game Winner) ^{†}
- Chattanooga FC (Championship Runner-Up) (Granted bye to Second Round due to late withdrawal of Rio Grande Valley FC)
- CD Aguiluchos USA (Playoff Semifinalist)
- Indiana Fire (Playoff Semifinalist)
- AFC Cleveland (Playoff Quarterfinalist)
- Clarkstown SC Eagles (Playoff Quarterfinalist)
- Myrtle Beach Mutiny (Playoff Quarterfinalist)
- Sacramento Gold (Playoff Quarterfinalist)
- Atlanta Silverbacks Reserves (at-large Berth)
- FC Wichita (at-large Berth)
- Fredericksburg FC (at-large Berth)
- Miami Fusion FC (at-large Berth)
- New York Athletic Club (at-large Berth)
- Detroit City FC (at-large Berth)

^{†} Withdrew on November 5, 2015
