= Primera División de México Apertura 2008 =

Primera División de México
- Season: 2008−09
- Champions: Toluca (9th title)
- Champions League: Toluca; Cruz Azul (Preliminary Round)
- Copa Libertadores: San Luis; Guadalajara; Pachuca (First Stage)
- SuperLiga: Guadalajara; Pachuca; Atlante; Santos Laguna
- Matches: 183
- Goals: 431 (2.36 per match)
- Top goalscorer: Héctor Mancilla (13 goals)
- Biggest home win: Atlas 5–0 Jaguares (July 26, 2008)
- Biggest away win: Monterrey 0–4 Morelia (September 20, 2008)
- Highest scoring: Guadalajara 3–5 Santos Laguna (with a total of 8 goals; August 23, 2008)

The 2008 Primera División Apertura is the first football tournament of the Mexican Primera División 2008−09 season. The tournament began in August 2008 and was contested by the league's 18 teams.

Reigning champion Santos Laguna failed to advance to the final losing 2-1 on a two-leg aggregate (0-0 in the first leg) to eventual champions Toluca in the semifinals, and were unable to defend their title. The team of Toluca would beat Cruz Azul 7-6 in penalties after tying 2-2 on a two-leg aggregate (2-0 in the first leg). This was Toluca's 9th championship, placing them as the third most successful club behind América and Guadalajara.

== Clubs ==
Club	Home city	Stadium	Capacity
América	Mexico City	Azteca	115,000
Atlante	Cancún	Andrés Quintana Roo	20,000
Atlas	Guadalajara	Jalisco	72,600
Chiapas	Tuxtla Gutiérrez	Víctor Manuel Reyna	23,208
Ciudad Juárez	Ciudad Juárez	Olímpico Benito Juárez	22,300
Cruz Azul	Mexico City	Azul	35,000
Guadalajara	Guadalajara	Jalisco	72,600
Monterrey	Monterrey	Tecnológico	38,000
Morelia	Morelia	Morelos	41,500
Necaxa	Aguascalientes	Victoria	25,000
Pachuca	Pachuca	Hidalgo	30,000
Puebla	Puebla	Cuauhtémoc	42,649
San Luis	San Luis Potosí	Alfonso Lastras	24,000
Santos	Torreón	Corona	18,050
Toluca	Toluca	Nemesio Díez	27,000
Tecos	Guadalajara	3 de Marzo	30,015
UANL	Monterrey	Universitario	41,000
UNAM	México	Olímpico Universitario	83,700

Locations of the Primera División 2008–09 teams

=== Managerial changes ===
This is a list of managerial changes made during the tournament.

Team	Outgoing manager	Manner of departure	Date of departure	Incoming manager	Date hired	Position in table
Ciudad Juárez	(Mexico) Sergio Orduña	Sacked	Aug. 18, 2008	(Uruguay) Héctor Hugo Eugui	Aug. 19, 2008	18th
Tecos	(Mexico) José Trejo	Sacked	Sep. 1, 2008	(Mexico) Miguel Herrera	Sep. 2, 2008	8th
Atlas	(Argentina) Miguel Brindisi	Resigned	Sep. 4, 2008	(Argentina) Darío Franco	Sep. 5, 2008	17th
Puebla	(Mexico) José Sánchez	Sacked	Sep. 17, 2008	(Mexico) Mario Carrillo	Sep. 17, 2008	16th
Chiapas	(Mexico) Sergio Almaguer	Sacked	Oct. 1, 2008	(Mexico) Francisco Avilán	Oct. 1, 2008	18th
Necaxa	(Mexico) Salvador Reyes Jr.	Sacked	Oct. 13, 2008	(Mexico) Octavio Becerril	Oct. 14, 2008	18th

== Regular phase ==
=== Standings ===
Pos	Team	Pld	W	D	L	GF	GA	GD	Pts	Qualification
1	San Luis	17	8	5	4	24	20	+4	29	2009 Copa Libertadores Second Stage
2	Toluca	17	7	6	4	25	16	+9	27	2009 InterLiga
3	Atlante	17	7	6	4	22	16	+6	27 (Note: Atlante, UNAM, Cruz Azul, and Santos Laguna do not qualify to the InterLiga due to existing commitment in the 2008–09 CONCACAF Champions League.)	
4	UNAM	17	7	5	5	22	13	+9	26	
5	Cruz Azul	17	7	5	5	29	23	+6	26	
6	UANL	17	7	5	5	22	16	+6	26	2009 InterLiga
7	UAG	17	7	4	6	30	28	+2	25	2009 InterLiga
8	Guadalajara	17	6	7	4	23	23	0	25	2009 InterLiga
9	Morelia	17	6	6	5	27	20	+7	24	2009 InterLiga
10	Santos Laguna	17	5	7	5	22	20	+2	22	
11	Atlas	17	6	4	7	23	27	−4	22	2009 InterLiga
12	Pachuca	17	5	6	6	25	25	0	21	2009 InterLiga
13	América	17	5	6	6	22	23	−1	21	2009 InterLiga
14	Ciudad Juárez	17	5	4	8	18	26	−8	19	
15	Monterrey	17	5	4	8	18	26	−8	19	
16	Chiapas	17	5	3	9	20	34	−14	18	
17	Necaxa	17	3	8	6	17	24	−7	17	
18	Puebla	17	2	9	6	12	21	−9	15	

Updated to match(es) played on November 16, 2009. Source: FeMexFut
Rules for classification: 1) points; 2) goal difference; 3) number of goals scored.

=== Group standings ===
Group 1
Pos	Team	Pld	W	D	L	GF	GA	GD	Pts
1	Atlante (A)	17	7	6	4	22	16	+6	27
2	Santos Laguna (A)	17	5	7	5	22	20	+2	22
3	Pachuca	17	5	6	6	25	25	0	21
4	Monterrey	17	5	4	8	18	26	−8	19
5	Ciudad Juárez	17	5	4	8	18	26	−8	19
6	Puebla	17	2	9	6	12	21	−9	15

(A) Advances to the Final Phase as the two-best teams in their group.

Group 2
Pos	Team	Pld	W	D	L	GF	GA	GD	Pts
1	UNAM (A)	17	7	5	5	22	13	+9	26
2	Cruz Azul (A)	17	7	5	5	29	23	+6	26
3	UAG (Q)	17	7	4	6	30	28	+2	25
4	Guadalajara	17	6	7	4	23	23	0	25
5	Morelia	17	6	6	5	27	20	+7	24
6	América	17	5	6	6	22	23	−1	21

(A) Advances to the Final Phase as the two-best teams in their group.; (Q) Qualifies to the Final Phase as the two-highest teams remaining in the general table.

Group 3
Pos	Team	Pld	W	D	L	GF	GA	GD	Pts
1	San Luis (A)	17	8	5	4	24	20	+4	29
2	Toluca (A)	17	7	6	4	25	16	+9	27
3	UANL (Q)	17	7	5	5	22	16	+6	26
4	Atlas	17	6	4	7	23	27	−4	22
5	Chiapas	17	5	3	9	20	34	−14	18
6	Necaxa	17	3	8	6	17	24	−7	17

Source: FeMexFut
Rules for classification: 1) points; 2) goal difference; 3) number of goals scored.
(A) Advances to the Final Phase as the two-best teams in their group.; (Q) Qualifies to the Final Phase as the two-highest teams remaining in the general table.

== Results ==
Home \ Away	AMÉ	ATE	ATL	CHI	CIU	CAZ	GUA	MON	MOR	NEC	PAC	PUE	SLA	SLU	TOL	UAG	UNL	UNM
América		1–2		2–3		2–0	1–2	1–0	1–1			1–1	3–2				1–3	
Atlante			2–2		3–3	1–1				0–1	2–1			1–0	2–1	3–1		2–0
Atlas	1–1			5–0		2–4	0–1	0–0	2–1			2–0	2–1	0–1				
Chiapas		1–1			2–1					4–0	2–1				0–0	1–3	1–3	0–3
Ciudad Juárez	0–0		2–4			1–0				2–3	2–1	1–0		2–3	1–1	0–1		
Cruz Azul				4–1			2–2	3–2	0–2	2–1	1–2		1–1		1–1	2–0		
Guadalajara		1–0		1–0	2–0			1–1	1–1				3–5				2–2	1–1
Monterrey		2–1		1–2	2–0				0–4				2–0			2–4	1–4	1–0
Morelia		0–0		5–2	0–1					3–1					3–2	2–2	1–2	1–0
Necaxa	2–0		0–1				2–2	0–1			1–1	0–0		1–1	1–1			
Pachuca	1–1		1–1				5–2	2–1	1–1			2–0	2–0	2–3				
Puebla		0–2		1–1		2–2	2–1	2–2	2–0				0–0				0–0	0–0
Santos Laguna		0–0		1–0	3–0				1–0	1–1						2–0	1–1	1–1
San Luis	1–2			2–0		2–1	0–0	2–0	2–2			1–1	2–2				1–0	
Toluca	2–1		4–0				0–1	0–0			3–0	3–1	2–1	1–0				
UAG	1–3		3–1				1–0			2–2	2–2	3–0		5–2	2–2			
UANL		1–0	3–0		0–1	1–3				1–1	0–0				0–1	1–0		0–2
UNAM	1–1		3–0		1–1	0–2				2–0	3–1			0–1	2–1	3–0		

Updated to match(es) played on November 16, 2009. Source: RSSSF
Legend: Blue = home team win; Yellow = draw; Red = away team win.

== Final phase (Liguilla) ==
Quarterfinals
1	San Luis	1	1	2
8	Santos Laguna	3	2	5
2	Toluca	0	2	2
7	UAG	0	0	0
4	UNAM	0	1	1
5	Cruz Azul	0	3	3
3	Atlante	1	1	2
6	UANL	1	1	2

Semifinals
8	Santos Laguna	0	1	1
2	Toluca	0	2	2
5	Cruz Azul	3	1	4
3	Atlante	1	1	2

Finals
2	Toluca (p)	2	0	2 (7)
5	Cruz Azul	0	2	2 (6)

Champions

9th title

Notes

- If the two teams are tied after both legs, the higher seeded team advances.
- Both finalist qualify to the 2009–10 CONCACAF Champions League. The champion qualifies directly to the Group Stage, while the runner-up qualifies to the Preliminary Round.

== Top goalscorers ==
P	Player	Team	Goals
1	(Chile) Hector Mancilla	Toluca	13
2	(Peru) Andrés Mendoza	Morelia	10
3	(Mexico) Adolfo Bautista	Chiapas	9
3	(Colombia) Hugo Rodallega	Necaxa	9
5	(Argentina) Christian Giménez	Pachuca	8
5	(Argentina) Lucas Lobos	UANL	8
7	(Ecuador) Christian Benítez	Santos Laguna	7
7	(Paraguay) Ariel Bogado	Atlas	7
7	(Uruguay) Víctor Piríz	San Luis	7
7	(Paraguay) Pablo Zeballos	Cruz Azul	7

Source: MedioTiempo

== See also ==
- List of Transfers of Torneo Clausura 2008 (Mexico)
