= List of Transfers of Torneo Clausura 2008 (Mexico) =

Player transfers involving clubs in Mexico's Torneo Clausura 2008 are listed below by club as incoming and outgoing transfers. They include both transfers between Mexican clubs and moves to or from clubs in other countries.

== América ==
In

- (Uruguay) Richard Núñez from (Mexico) Cruz Azul
- (Argentina) Federico Higuaín from (Turkey) Beşiktaş
- (Argentina) Sebastián Domínguez from (Argentina) Estudiantes de La Plata

Out

- (Mexico) Duilio Davino to (United States) FC Dallas
- (Argentina) Lucas Castromán to (Argentina) Boca Juniors
- (Mexico) Santiago Fernández to (Mexico) Toluca
- (Chile) Ricardo Rojas to (Chile) Colo-Colo

== Atlante ==
In

- (Venezuela) Daniel Arismendi from (Venezuela) Caracas FC
- (Mexico) David Toledo from (Mexico) UNAM
- (Mexico) Edwin Borboa from (Mexico) Chivas

Out

- (Mexico) José Joel González to (Mexico) Monterrey
- (Mexico) Fernando López to (Mexico) Necaxa

== Atlas ==
In

- (Paraguay) Jorge Achucarro from (Paraguay) Cerro Porteño
- (Argentina) Emanuel Centurión from (Argentina) Colón
- (Uruguay) Jorge Bava from (Paraguay) Libertad

Out

- (Mexico) Juan Carlos Valenzuela to (Mexico) Tecos
- (Argentina) Hernán Encina to (Argentina) Colón
- (Uruguay) Nicolás Olivera to (Mexico) Puebla F.C.
- (Mexico) Aarón Padilla to (Mexico) Chiapas
- (Mexico) Carlos Balcázar to (Mexico) Chiapas
- (Argentina) Lucas Barrios to (Chile) Colo-Colo
- (Mexico) Christian Sánchez to (Mexico) Chiapas

== Chivas ==
In

- (Mexico) Omar Arellano from (Mexico) Pachuca

Out

- (Mexico) Edwin Borboa to (Mexico) Atlante F.C.

== Cruz Azul ==
In

- (Mexico) Jaime Lozano from (Mexico) Tigres
- (Mexico) Joaquín Beltrán from (Mexico) Necaxa
- (Mexico) José Luis López from (Mexico) UNAM
- (Uruguay) Nicolás Vigneri from (Uruguay) Peñarol
- (Paraguay) Pablo Zeballos from (Paraguay) Sol de América

Out

- (Mexico) Israel López to (Mexico) Toluca
- (Uruguay) Richard Núñez to (Mexico) América
- (Argentina) César Delgado to (France) Olympique Lyonnais
- (Mexico) Luis Orozco to (Mexico) Monarcas Morelia
- (Mexico) Jared Borgetti to (Mexico) Monterrey

== Jaguares de Chiapas ==
In

Out
