= Abdullah Qazi =

Pakistani footballer

Abdulah Qazi
Personal information
- Date of birth: 26 July 1987 (age 39)
- Place of birth: Karachi, Pakistan
- Height: 1.82 m (6 ft 0 in)
- Position: Defender

Senior career*
Years	Team	Apps	(Gls)
2015–2016	Melita		
2018–2019	La Máquina		
2019–2020	A.S. Los Angeles		

International career
2018–2019	Pakistan	6	(0)
- * Club domestic league appearances and goals

Abdulah Qazi (born 26 July 1987), is a Pakistani former footballer who played as a defender.

== Club career ==
Qazi started playing football late, at the age of 23.

From 2015 to 2016, Qazi was member of Maltese club Melita F.C.

In 2018, Qazi played for La Máquina at the United Premier Soccer League, where his defensive ability was brought to attention and soon was called up to the national team.

In 2019, Qazi signed for A.S. Los Angeles.

== International career ==
Qazi earned his first national team call up in July 2018. He made his debut at the 2018 SAFF Championship, where he made three appearances against Nepal, Bangladesh and Bhutan, as sealed its place in the semi-finals. He was called up once more in December in a friendly against Palestine. He last played in June 2019 against Cambodia at the 2022 FIFA World Cup qualifiers.

== Career statistics ==
=== International ===
Appearances and goals by year and competition
National team	Year	Apps	Goals
Pakistan	2018	5	0
Pakistan	2019	1	0
Total		6	0
