= Edwin Borboa =

Mexican footballer (born 1983)

Personal information
- Full name: Edwin Alejandro Borboa Pérez
- Date of birth: 11 January 1983 (age 43)
- Place of birth: Los Mochis, Sinaloa, Mexico
- Height: 1.75 m (5 ft 9 in)
- Position: Forward

Senior career*
| Years | Team | Apps | (Gls) |
| 2004–2008 | Guadalajara | 28 | (2) |
| 2007–2008 | → Atlante (loan) | 4 | (1) |
| 2008 | → León (loan) | 13 | (1) |
| 2008–2011 | Pachuca | 3 | (0) |
| 2009–2010 | → Dorados (loan) | 38 | (9) |
| 2010 | → Atlante UTN (loan) | 4 | (0) |
| 2011–2012 | Indios de Ciudad Juarez | 21 | (7) |
| 2012 | U. de G. | 14 | (1) |
| 2013 | Lobos BUAP | 5 | (0) |
| 2015 | La Máquina | 105 | (88) |
- * Club domestic league appearances and goals as of 26 April 2013

Edwin Alejandro Borboa Pérez (Note: In this Spanish name, the first or paternal surname is Borboa and the second or maternal family name is Pérez.) (born 11 January 1983) is a Mexican former professional footballer who played as a forward for La Máquina of the United Premier Soccer League.

He previously played for Indios de Ciudad Juarez, Atlante UTN (the filial team of Atlante), Pachuca and Dorados de Sinaloa.

He started his career with C.D. Guadalajara.

== Honours ==
Guadalajara

- Mexican Primera División: Apertura 2006

Atlante

- Mexican Primera División: Apertura 2007
