= Kieran Roberts =

American actor and singer

Kieran
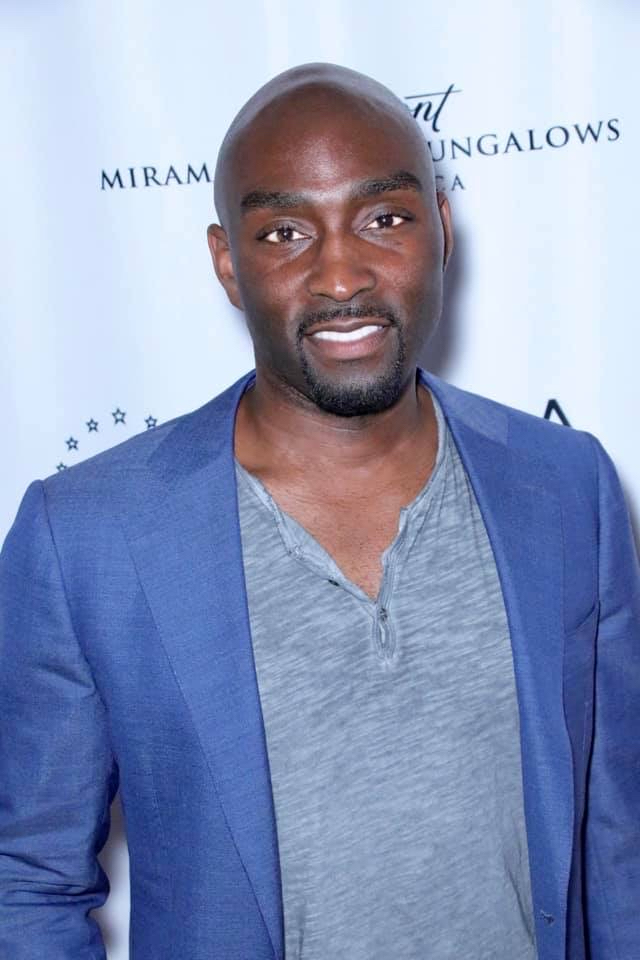
- Roberts in 2019
- Born: Kieran Roberts; June 25, 1981 (age 45); Brooklyn, U.S.
- Occupations: Actor, Singer, Entrepreneur
- Years active: 2002–present
- Height: 5 ft 10 in (178 cm)
- Spouse: To-Tam Sachika
- Children: 2
- Parent(s): Linwood Roberts, Dorrett Roberts
- Relatives: Bryan Roberts (brother), Chad Roberts (brother)
- Musical career
- Origin: New York City, New York, U.S.
- Genres: R&B
- Instrument: Vocals
- Label: Black Rain Records
- Website: www.kieranhroberts.com

Kieran Roberts, also known as Kieran, is an American television & film actor, singer and entrepreneur. He scored three hits on Billboard's Adult R&B charts, "Hard Time" (peaking at No. 24 on February 24, 2007), "You Saved My Life" (peaking at No. 25 on August 4, 2007) and "Oh Darlin'" (peaking at No. 39 on October 14, 2006). Roberts has also opened for Snoop Dogg, Lil Wayne, Boyz II Men and others, as well as collaborating with Yung Joc and Shawty Lo on the track "My Way". Roberts has also appeared in TV and streaming series.

== Early life and career ==
Roberts was born in New York City, the son of Linwood Roberts Sr., a real estate investor and record label owner, and his mother, a registered nurse. Roberts' father founded Black Rain Records when he was 15. Roberts, who had sung in his church choir, expressed interest in entering the entertainment industry while attending Fordham University, and shifted his focus to music full-time.

His first and only album, released under his father's label in 2005 and produced by Roberts' father, is Breathe as Kieran, generating the Billboard Adult R&B hits "Hard Time", "You Saved My Life" and "Oh Darlin'". He also released "My Way", a collaborative track with Shawty Lo and Yung Joc.

Roberts appeared on The Montel Williams Show in support of his album; he is currently pursuing acting as Kieran Roberts. Roberts also owned the Green Grotto Juice Bar, a juice bar brand in Los Angeles.

Roberts began acting in 2011 and has appeared in TV and streaming series, including CBS’ FBI: International, ABC’s For Life and Peacock’s Bust Down. He also appears in Netflix’s Me Time.

== Discography ==
=== Albums ===
- Breathe (2005)
- Breathe (Special Edition) (2006)

=== Singles ===
- "Thinking About Me" (Remix) (2002)
- "Thinking About Me" (2002)
- "R U Awake" (2003)
- "Keep It Cool" (2005)
- "Keep It Cool / Let's Get Away" (2005)
- "Keep It Cool / Let's Get Away / No More" (2005)
- "Hard Time" (2006)
- "Let's Get Away" (featuring Fabolous) (2006)
- "Let's Get Away / R U Awake" (2006)
- "R U Awake" (featuring Jadakiss) (2006)
- "Lemme See Ya (Stick Stick)" (featuring Trick Daddy and Big Will) (2007)
- "You Saved My Life" (2007)
- "My Way" (featuring Yung Joc and Shawty Lo) (2008)

== Filmography ==
=== Film ===
Year	Title	Role	Notes
2011	Unidentified	David	Short
2011	Pitch Black	Fonte	Short
2014	Office Ninja	Employee	
2021	Up Country	John	
2022	Me Time	Ibrahim	
2022	Four on the Mantle	Julius	Short

=== Television ===
Year	Title	Role	Notes
2021	For Life	Court Officer Roberts	Episode: "Andy Josiah"
2022	Bust Down	Abegunde Madu	Episode: “Party of Two”
2022	FBI: International	Jeremy Wilcox	Episode: “On These Waters”
