= Amelia Earhart Park =

Urban park in unincorporated Miami-Dade County, Florida, US

Coordinates: 25.8862646°N 80.2786059°W

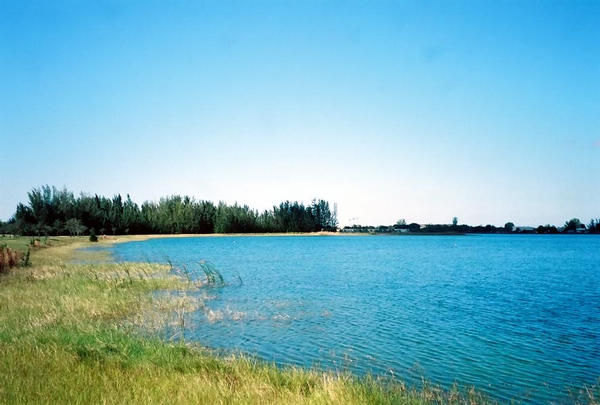
- Lakeshore near the park's main road, a disk golf course in the distance
- Interactive map of Amelia Earhart Park
- Type: Municipal
- Location: Miami, Miami-Dade County, Florida, United States
- Area: 515 acres (0.805 mi^{2})
- Created: 1980
- Operator: Miami-Dade County Parks and Recreation Department
- Website: Amelia Earhart Park

Amelia Earhart Park is a 515-acre (208.41 ha) urban park in unincorporated Miami-Dade County, just north of Hialeah, Florida. It offers a number of recreational attractions like bike trails, skateboarding, and fishing.

== History ==
This Miami-Dade County regional park was the southern undeveloped portion of decades old Naval Air Station Miami. It was never an airport and never part of the City of Miami-owned Miami Municipal Airport which was on the east side of LeJeune Road and south of NW 119th Street (E. 65th Street) in Hialeah. Amelia Earhart's last ill-fated trip around the world flight left from Miami Municipal Airport in 1937 en route to San Juan, PR, and then south from there and across the Atlantic to Africa. Miami Municipal Airport was renamed Amelia Earhart Field in October 1947. When the Navy discontinued operations at Naval Air Station Miami the U. S. Marine Corps moved to the Navy property from Master Field, another large airport on NW 27th Avenue, east of Amelia Earhart Field . Marine Corps Air Station Miami only operated a couple of years before the Marines shut it down. The federal government's General Services Administration was then charged with disposition of the property and they granted a Dade County bid to assume ownership of the air station's existing airport facilities except for a portion reserved for the U. S. Coast Guard's Air Station Miami. The county named the airport "Opa-locka Airport" due to the name of the city immediately east of the airport. Community leaders, notably Bill Graham (dairy farmer and developer of the Miami Lakes community) successfully lobbied the federal government to be granted about half of the property on the southern portion of the former Naval Air Station, extending from LeJeune Road westward to approximately W. 2nd Avenue in Hialeah, to be given to the county for a large regional park. The remaining southern portion of undeveloped air station land was auctioned off to private developers west and north of Amelia Earhart Regional Park. Amelia Earhart's Farm Village is named after Bill Graham, son of former state senator Ernest R. "Cap" Graham, and the developer of the Miami Lakes residential and commercial development west of Opa-locka Executive Airport.

== Facilities ==
The park offers 8-mile (13 km) of bike trails. They include single track and fire road trails with a number of climbs, downhills, and banked corners. The Bill Graham Farm Village is a farm replica featuring a demonstration shed where visitors can watch horseshoeing, cow-milking, livestock judging and sheep shearing, as well as a petting zoo, exhibit hall, sugar cane press and pony ring. Near the barn is a country store and an adjoining insect museum.

There is fenced, 5-acre (20,000 m^{2}) dog park, an 18-hole disc golf course, and other amenities which include paved walkways, playgrounds, benches, shade trees, waste dispenser stations.

== See also ==
- Glenn Curtiss
- Amelia Earhart

== Gallery ==
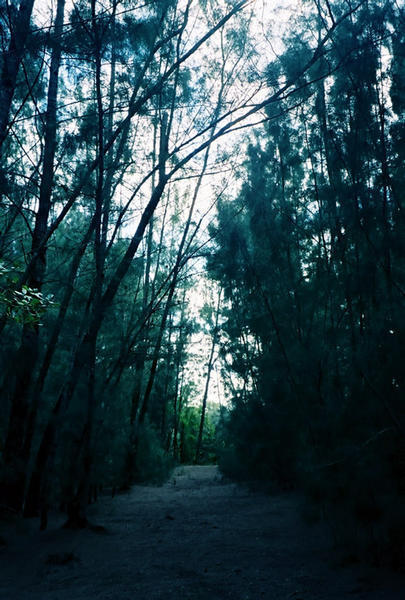
A bike path through Australian pines

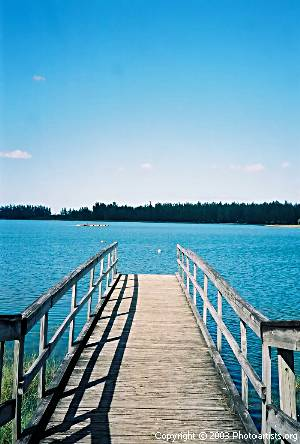
Fishing dock by a lake across near bike trails
