= La Máquina FC =

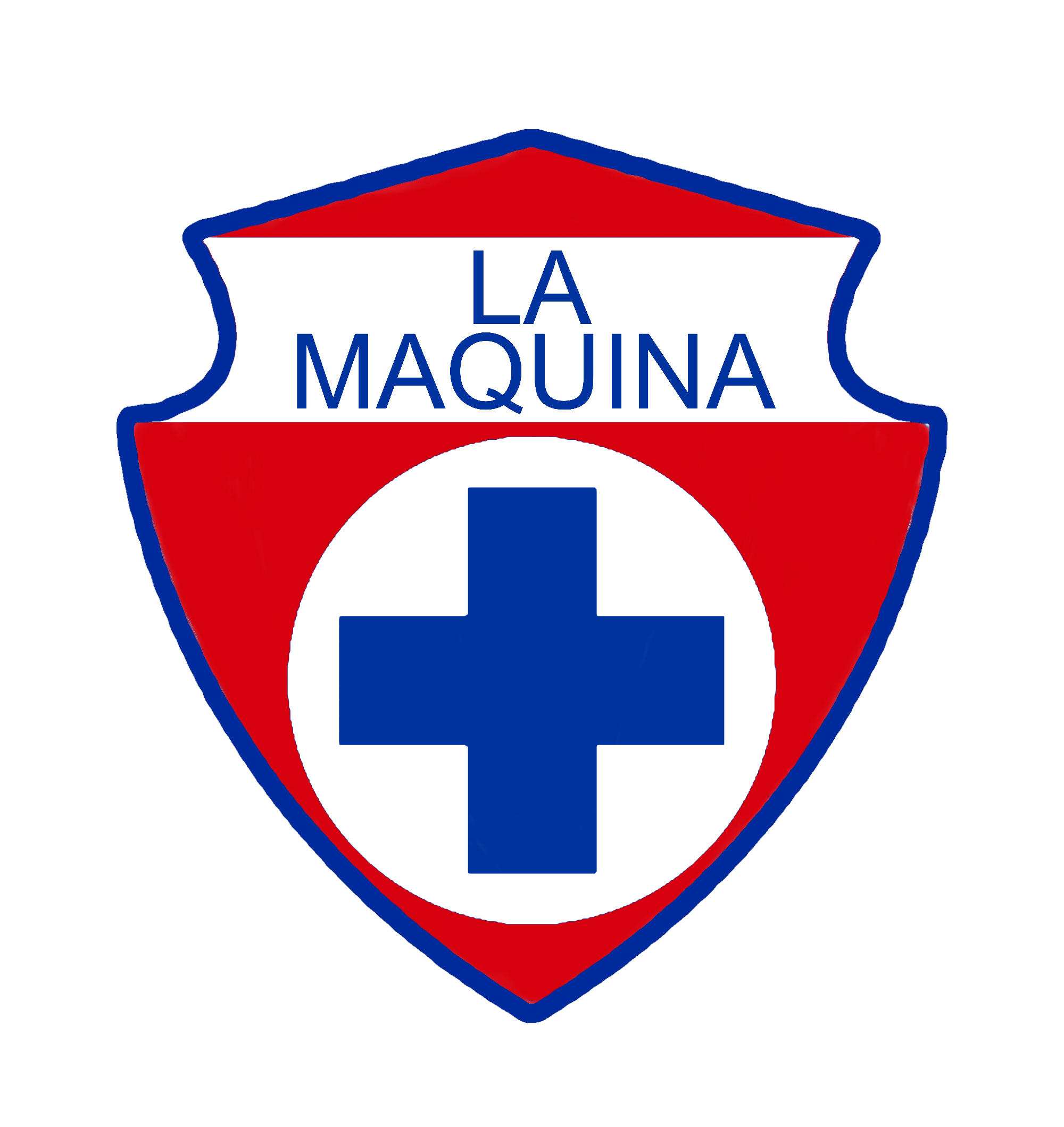
- Nickname: La Máquina
- Founded: 2004
- Ground: Santa Ana Valley H.S. (UPSL); Lake Forest Sports Park (UPSL); Mater Dei (Training); Westminster High School (Open Cup)
- League: United Premier Soccer League
Home colors

La Máquina is an American amateur football club, based out of the Santa Ana, California area, in central Orange County, competing in the United Premier Soccer League. The club takes its name and identity from Cruz Azul of Liga MX, and was formed as a branch of the Irvine Premier Soccer Club's FC Golden State, for competing in the UPSL.

== U.S. Open Cup record ==
=== 2016 ===
La Máquina entered the 2016 U.S. Open Cup, in the first round against the Portland Timbers U-23 of the Premier Development League, and advanced to the second round by defeating the Timbers by a score of 2–0. La Máquina qualified to the First Round of the 2016 U.S. Open Cup by defeating 2015 Lamar Hunt U.S. Open Cup Chula Vista FC by a score of 4–0.

La Máquina defeated the Sacramento Gold of the National Premier Soccer League by a score of 2–0 in the second round of the Open Cup on May 18, 2016 at Westminster High School in Westminster, California and advanced to face fellow UPSL side LA Wolves FC in a historic face off putting two new clubs and leagues in the third round. This was the first Open Cup for both teams.

On June 1, 2016, La Máquina defeated L.A. Wolves in the third round of the U.S. Open Cup and advanced to the following round to face the LA Galaxy at the StubHub Center on June 14, 2016.

La Máquina faced the LA Galaxy at the StubHub Center in Carson, CA and fell in extra time by a score of 4–1 on June 14, 2016, after a controversial goal was allowed by the referee in favor of the Galaxy. The match commentators said that the final score was not reflective of how the match played out, given that La Máquina held the Galaxy to a 1–1 tie for 90 minutes. Although there were questionable calls in the match, La Máquina had a man advantage for about 70 minutes of regulation time, after Galaxy midfielder Rafael García was ejected from the game upon receiving a straight red card on a foul to La Máquina's midfielder Ramiro Zurdo Díaz. La Máquina were incapable of closing the game in regulation time.

May 11, 2016 2016 First Round	Portland Timbers U23 (PDL)	0–2	La Máquina FC (UPSL)	Portland, Oregon
7:00 pmPDT		USSF Report; PTU23 Report	Diaz 6'; Borboa 90+3'	Stadium: Providence Park

May 18, 2016 2016 Second Round	La Máquina FC (UPSL)	2–0	Sacramento Gold (NPSL)	Westminster, California
7:00 pmPDT	Borboa 70'; Pérez 79'	Report		Stadium: Boswell Field at Westminster High School

June 1, 2016 2016 Third Round	La Máquina FC (UPSL)	2–0	LA Wolves FC (UPSL)	Westminster, California
7:00 pmPDT	Borboa 17'; Borboa 68'	Report		Stadium: Boswell Field at Westminster High School

June 14, 2016 2016 Fourth Round	LA Galaxy (MLS)	4–1 (a.e.t.)	La Máquina FC (UPSL)	Carson, California
7:00 pmPDT	José Villareal 15'; Dave Romney 96'; Sebastian Lletget 105'; Sebastian Lletget 115'		Edwin Borboa 28'	Stadium: StubHub Center; Referee: Ramón Hernández

==== 2016 Qualifying ====
La Máquina qualified to their first U.S. Open Cup in two qualifying rounds. There were to be three elimination rounds, but the U.S. Soccer Federation used its discretion to qualify the winners of the second qualifying rounds, due to the restructuring of the tournament that took place that year.

2016 First Qualifying Round	Strikers FC South Coast	2–3	La Máquina FC	Lake Forest, California
	2		3	Stadium: Lake Forest Sports Park

2016 Second Qualifying Round	Chula Vista FC	0–4	La Máquina FC	Chula Vista, California
	0		4

=== 2017 ===
La Máquina qualified to their second consecutive U.S. Open Cup, in two qualifying rounds, by defeating Orange County FC and Santa Ana Winds FC in late 2016. However, the club would not match the deep run they made the year prior, after being eliminated in the first round by Fresno Fuego of the Premier Development League.

May 10, 2017 2017 First Round	Fresno Fuego (PDL)	4–1	La Máquina FC (UPSL)	Fresno, California
	4		1	Stadium: Chukchansi Park

==== 2017 Qualifying ====
2017 First Qualifying Round	La Máquina FC (UPSL)	3–0	Orange County FC (So Cal Premier)	Jurupa, California
	3		0	Stadium: Rancho Jurupa Regional Sports Park

2017 Second Qualifying Round	La Máquina FC (UPSL)	3–0	Santa Ana Winds FC (UPSL)	Irvine, California
	3		0	Stadium: Orange County Great Park

=== 2018 ===
La Máquina qualified to their third consecutive U.S. Open Cup on November 19, 2017 by defeating Chula Vista FC of the So Cal Premier League by a score of 4–1. La Máquina defeated fellow UPSL club Bell Gardens FC in the first round and Las Vegas Mobsters in the second round by forfeit.

==== 2018 Qualifying ====
2018 First Qualifying Round	Bell Gardens FC (UPSL)	0–5	La Máquina FC (UPSL)	Bell Gardens, California
	0		5	Stadium: John Anson Ford Park

2018 Second Qualifying Round	La Máquina FC (UPSL)	1–0 (forfeit)	Las Vegas Mobsters (UPSL)	Santa Ana, California
	1		0	Stadium: Santa Ana Valley Falcons Stadium

2018 Third Qualifying Round	Chula Vista FC (So Cal Premier)	1–4	La Máquina (UPSL)	Chula Vista, California
	1		4	Stadium: Chula Vista Elite Athlete Training Center

== Year by year ==
La Máquina was suspended from Spring 2016 UPSL play for being involved in a brawl with fellow league club San Nicolas FC in 2015, however, La Máquina returned to the UPSL after serving a six-game suspension.

Year	Division	League	Spring Season	Fall Season	Playoffs	Open Cup
2014	4	UPSL	Combined		Champions	
2015	4	UPSL (Southeast Conference)	Combined - 2nd (8-0-2)		Runner Up	
2016	4	UPSL (Southeast Conference)	Suspended	3rd (10-3-1)		Fourth round
2017	4	UPSL (Western Conference)	2nd Pro Premier-SoCal North (10-1-0)	4th Pro Premier-SoCal North (8-3-2)	Spring: DNQ Fall: Western Pro Premier Final	
2018	4	UPSL (Western Conference)	4th Pro Premier-SoCal North (8-3-2)	Hiatus	Spring: Quarterfinals	
2019						

== Squad ==
The following players formed La Máquina's 2016 U.S. Open Cup squad:

Note: Flags indicate national team as defined under FIFA eligibility rules; some limited exceptions apply. Players may hold more than one non-FIFA nationality. Squad correct as of June 7, 2016.

No.	Pos.	Nation	Player
1		MEX	Luis Sosa
3		USA	Víctor Vásquez
4		PAK	Abdullah Qazi
5		USA	Joel Palomares
6		USA	Carlos Aguilar
7		USA	Edgar Orozco
8		MEX	Edwin Borboa
9		MEX	Jorge Pineda
10		MEX	Ramiro Diaz
11		USA	Rolando Pinedo
14		USA	Rodolfo Godínez, Jr.
15		MEX	Rosendo Castro Pérez
16		MEX	José Castro Pérez
17		USA	David Paniagua
18		USA	Ricardo Ramírez
19		USA	Carlos Godínez
20		USA	Jonathan Canales Martínez
—		USA	Ricardo Canales
—		USA	Julio Madrigal
—		MEX	Óscar Reyes Zárate
