= FC Kendall =

- Full name: Football Club Kendall
- Founded: 2008
- Ground: Kendall Soccer Park (KSP)
- President: Hans Neuman and Mauro Grignola
- League: UPSL

FC Kendall is an elite amateur team based in Miami, FL competing in the United Premier Soccer League (UPSL) which is affiliated to the Florida State Soccer Association (FSSA), United States Adult Soccer Association (USASA), and the U.S. Soccer Federation (USSF).

== History ==
Formed in 2008 as Uruguay Kendall FC as a representation of the founders' Uruguayan roots, the club changed their name to FC Kendall in July 2017. The team has competed in the local South Florida Leagues. In 2015 the team joined as an original member of the regional American Premier Soccer League, finishing as runner-up in the inaugural season.

On March 1, 2020, FC Kendall was crowned CHAMPIONS of the South Florida League, A division. They decided to continue there season and join the UPSL.
