= Tropical Park Stadium =

Stadium in Florida, United States

Coordinates: 25°43′48″N 80°19′22″W

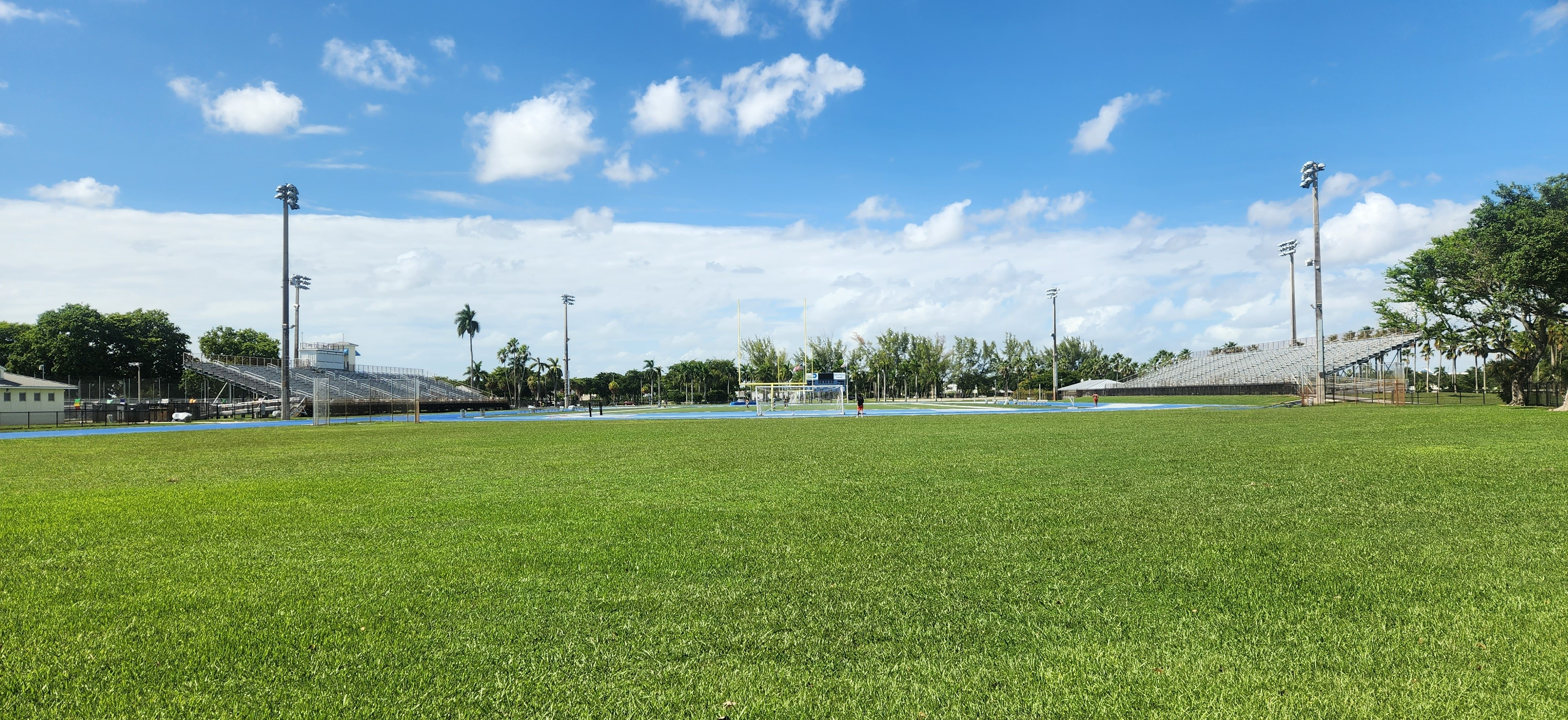
- Tropical Park Stadium in September 2023
- Interactive map of Tropical Park Stadium
- Location: 7900 SW 40th Street; Miami, FL 33155
- Owner: Miami-Dade Parks & Recreation
- Operator: Miami-Dade Parks & Recreation
- Capacity: 7,000
- Surface: Bermuda grass
- Field size: 105 x 68 meters

Construction
- Built: 1979

Tenants
- Miami Americans (ASL) (1980); Miami FC (USL First Division) (2006–08); Miami Dade FC (APSL) (2015–present); FC Miami City (USL2) (2016–present); Red Force FC (UPSL)

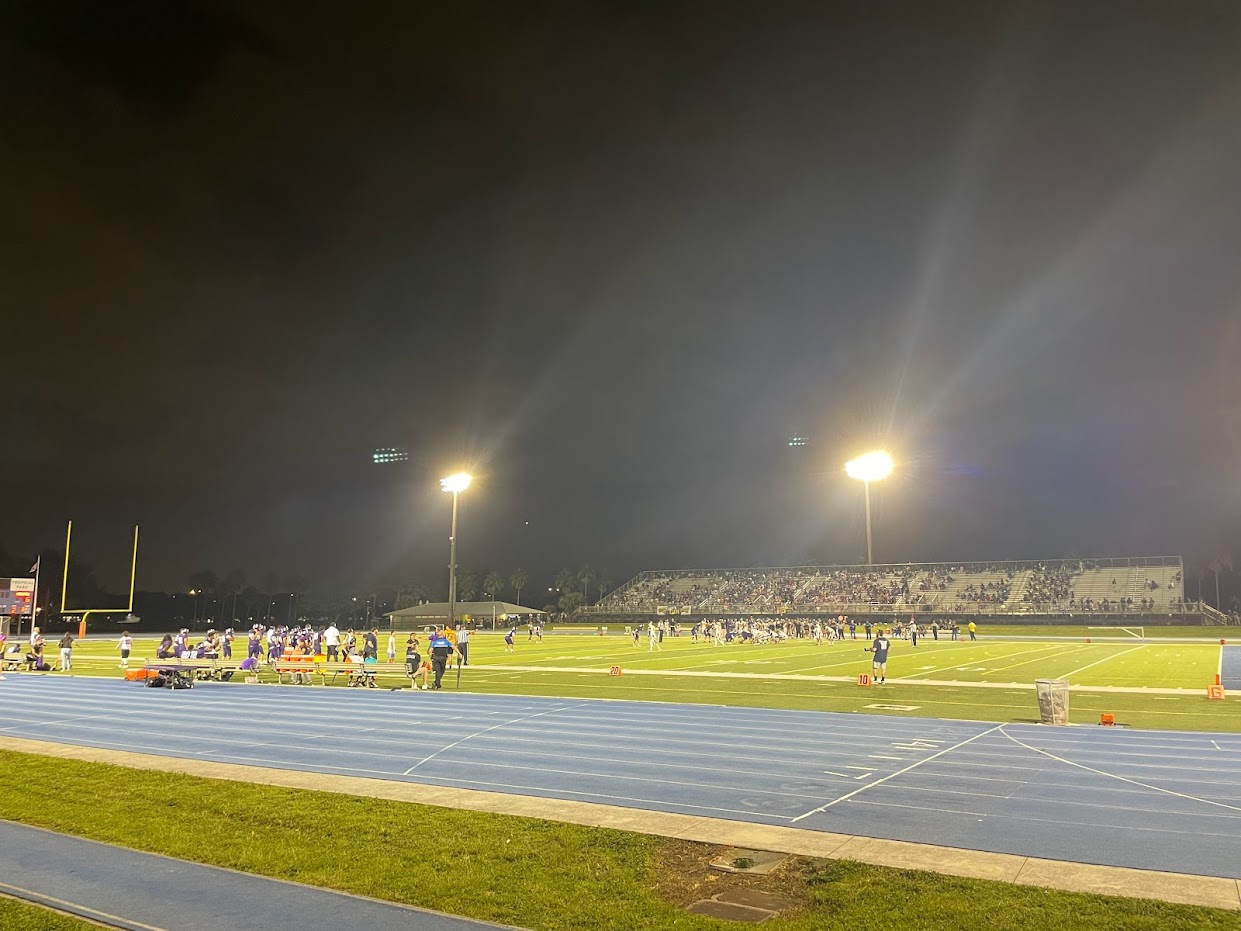
View of stadium at night

Tropical Park Stadium is a 7,000-seat stadium located in Olympia Heights, Florida, a census-designated place near Miami, Florida, United States. The stadium is located in Tropical Park and is the home field of Miami Dade FC and FC Miami City. Also, many local high-school football teams use it as their home field. It was also former home Miami FC of USL First Division.

The multi-purpose stadium features an athletics track, and a grass field used for soccer, American football, rugby, and other various sports.

Tropical Park hosted matches during the 2006 CONCACAF Women's Gold Cup.

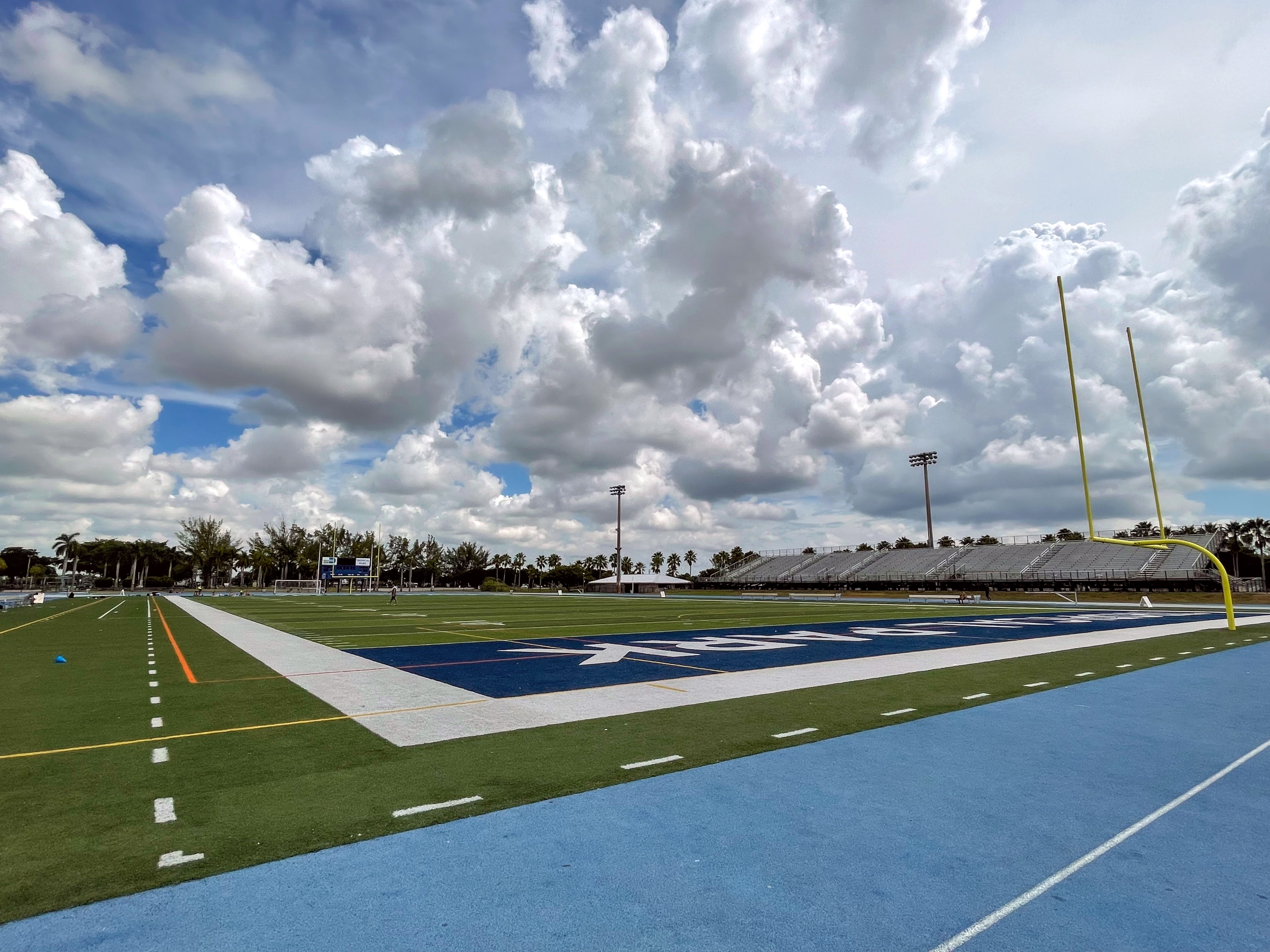
View of the Tropical Park Stadium field.
