= FC Denver =

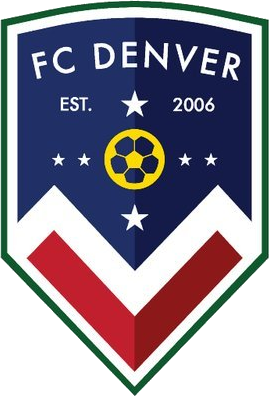
- Full name: FC Denver
- Founded: 2005
- President: Eric Fulton
- General Manager: Luke Elbin
- Head Coach: Drew Melin
- League: Colorado Premier League
- Website: http://fcdenver.org/
Home colors	Away colors

FC Denver is an American soccer club based in Denver, Colorado. The club plays in the Colorado Premier League (under USSSA umbrella) and participates in regional and national tournaments the U.S. Open Cup, The Las Vegas Silver Mug, and Colorado State Cup tournaments. Previously, the club participated in the Premier Arena Soccer League between 2012 and 2014. The club has five men's teams (Premier, United, U19, Masters (Over-30), & Legends (Over-30)). Although the club's crest honors the colors of Denver's city flag, the club wears its traditional colors of green, white, and black.

== History ==
FC Denver was founded in winter 2005/2006 and played its first match in March 2006. FC Denver began as a single men's amateur soccer team playing in the now defunct Comets Soccer League. The club grew to four outdoor teams by 2011.

The club's top men's team, Premier, which has won the 2013 & 2015 Colorado State Cup. The win qualified them for the 2013-14 USSSA national championships in March 2014 where they lost in the semifinals to eventual champion Colorado Rovers S.C.

During the Fall of 2017, FC Denver won three qualifying matches to qualify for the 2018 US Open Cup. FC Denver went on to win its 2018 US Open Cup round 1 match vs Azteca FC by a 4–2 scoreline and lose 3–2 to USL team Colorado Switchbacks FC in Round. In Summer of 2018, the club announced its first youth team, a U19 team to begin league play in Spring 2019.

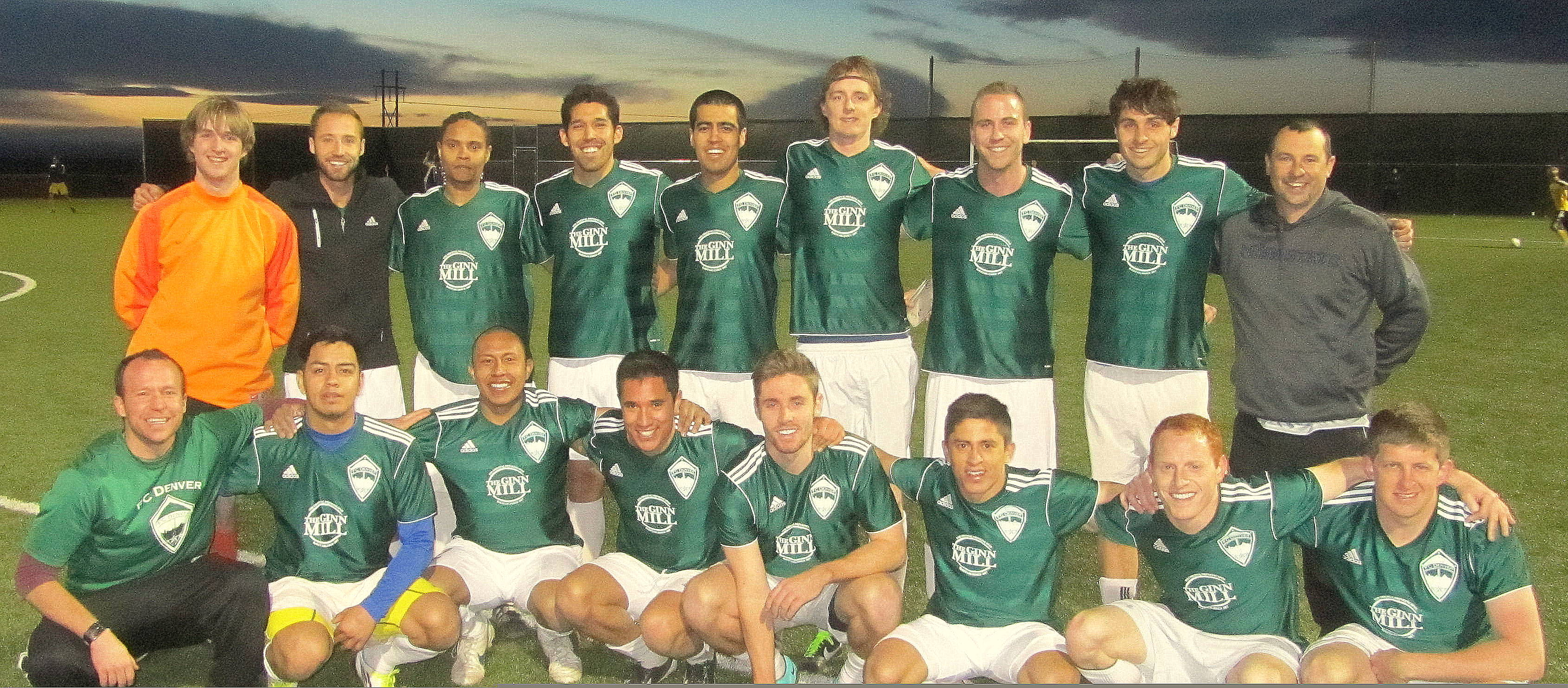
Taos Eco Park Championship Team - Spring 2013

== Honors ==
- US Open Cup 2018 Round 1 Winners - May 2018
- US Open Cup 2018 Qualifiers - Fall 2017
- CASL 1st Division champions - Fall 2015
- USSSA Colorado State Cup champions - July 2015
- USSSA National Cup Semifinalist - March 2014
- USSSA Colorado State Cup champions - July 2013
- Choice Wireless Spring Soccer Showcase Champions - April 2013
- CASL 1st Division champions - Fall 2012
- CASL 1st Division champions - Fall 2011
- Comets Soccer League Premier Division champions - Spring 2007
- Colorado State Cup Eid Cup champions - August 2006

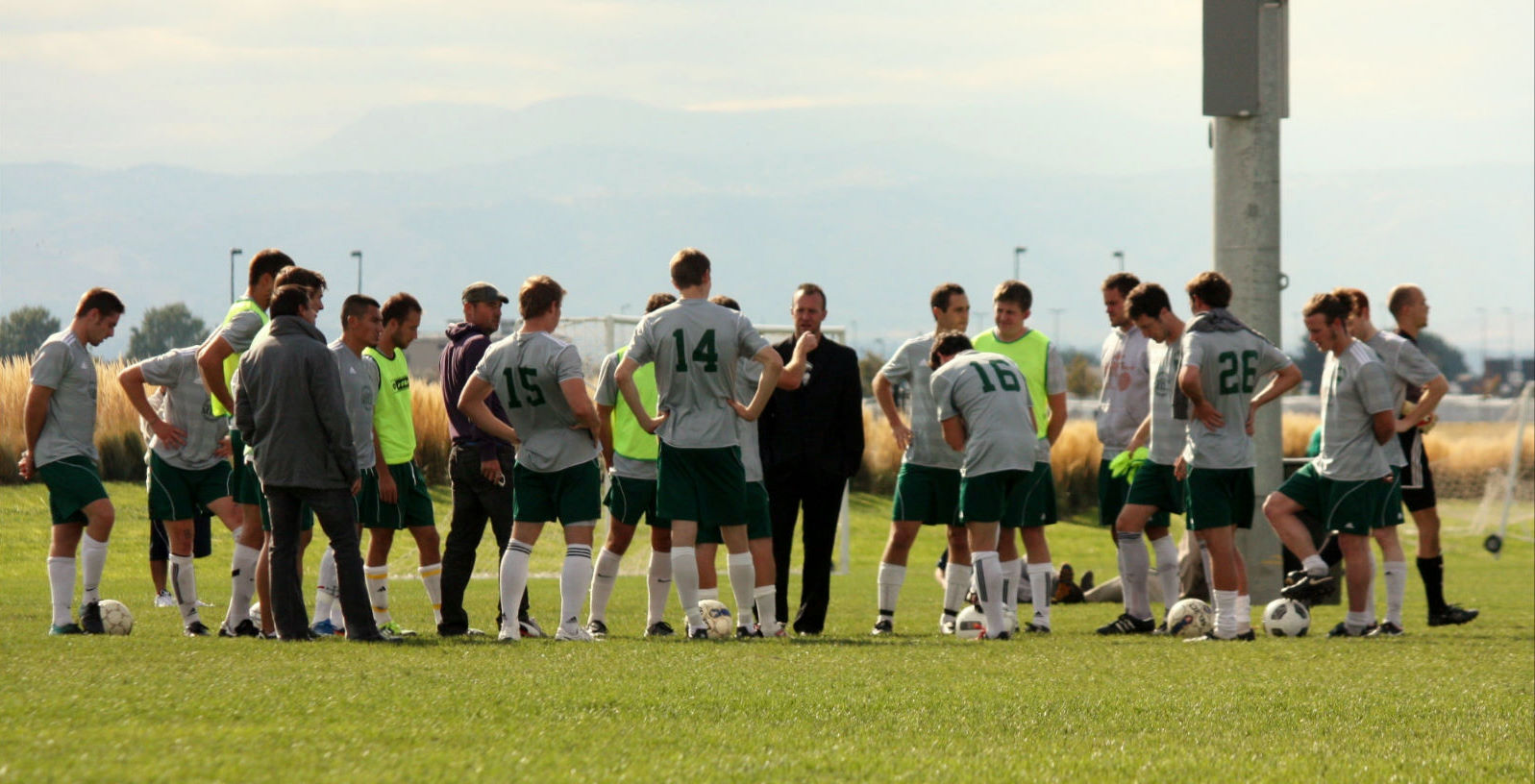
Team preparing for a match

== PASL Indoor Standings Year-by-year ==
Year	Win	Loss	Tie	GF	GA	GD	Division	Reg. season	Avg. attendance
2013-2014	5	3	0	46	41	5	Rocky Mountain	2nd Place	240
2012-2013	5	3	0	47	35	12	Rocky Mountain	2nd Place	190

== Head coaches ==
- (United States) Drew Melin (2015–Present)
- (United States) Luke Elbin (2013–2015)
- (United States) Kyle Firebaugh (2009-2012)
- (United States) Eric Fulton (2006-2008)
