= Red Force FC =

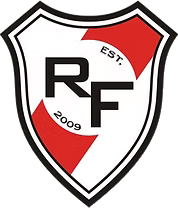
- Full name: Red Force Football Club
- Founded: 2009
- Ground: Tropical Park Stadium; Miami, Florida
- Capacity: 7,000
- Head Coach: Gabriel Vega
- League: National Premier Soccer League
Home colors	Away colors

Red Force Football Club is an amateur soccer team based in Miami, Florida that has played in the National Premier Soccer League since 2020. The club was founded in 2009, and it is coached by Gabriel Vega, alongside team managers Christian Vega and Juan Vega.

Their accomplishments include being four time SSM Premier League champions, winning the State Cup in 2012 and being runner-up in the 2013 regionals, as well as winning the Florida Open Cup in 2013.

In 2013, Red Force qualified for the 2013 Lamar Hunt U.S. Open Cup via winning the 2013 Florida Open Cup. The team hosted PDL outfit, Ocala Stampede and lost 4–2.
