= 2018 Fall UPSL season =

United Premier Soccer League
- Season: 2018 Fall
- Champions: California United FC II

The 2018 Fall United Premier Soccer League season is the 11th season of the UPSL. Milwaukee Bavarian SC are the reigning champions. However, the Midwest Conference will not participate in the fall season, and the Bavarians will not be able to defend their title.

For the Fall 2018 season, UPSL had 89 teams compete in 13 Pro Premier Divisions divided into 5 conferences. An additional 29 teams competed in 3 Championships Divisions from 2 Conferences. The overall structure of the League by Conference and roughly from west to east is represented in the table below

Conference	Western				Mountain	Colorado	Central			Southeast			
Pro Premier Divisions	SoCal North	SoCal South	Wild West North	Wild West South	Mountain	Colorado	North	Heart	South	Mid-Atlantic North	Mid-Atlantic South	Florida Central	Florida South
Championship Divisions	SoCal North	SoCal South	n/a		n/a	n/a	n/a			n/a		Florida Central	n/a

* Not participating

== Pro Premier ==
=== Team changes ===
Joined Heart Division

- Austin Real Cuauhtemoc — joined from Texas Premier Soccer League
- FC Thunder Boerne — new senior team of youth club
- Coyotes FC — new club
- FC Knights — transferred from South Division
- FC Waco — new club
- Major Academy Competitive FC — new senior team of youth club
- Round Rock SC — transferred from South Division
- San Antonio Runners SC — new club

Joined North Division
- Dallas City FC — joined from National Premier Soccer League during offseason
- FC Denton — joined from North Texas Premier Soccer Association
- Irving City FC
- Terrell FC — joined from North Texas Premier Soccer Association

Left North Division

- OKC 1889 FC — on hiatus
- Texas Spurs

Joined South Division
- Armadillos FC — new senior team of youth club
- FC Imperial — new senior team of youth club
- Houston FC — joined from Premier Development League during offseason

Left South Division

- FC Knights — transferred to Heart Division
- Round Rock SC — transferred to Heart Division

Joined Colorado Conference
- Bright Stars of Colorado SC — promoted from Pro Premier

Left Colorado Conference

- Colorado Springs FC
- Denver Metro FC
- FC Boulder — expelled from league
- FC Greeley — expelled from league
- Northern Colorado FC

Joined Mountain Conference

None

Left Mountain Conference

- Idaho Lobos FC
- Provo Premier
- Magic Valley FC

Joined Florida Central Division
- Huracan ECUSA FC
- The Institute FC — new club

Left Florida Central Division

- Clay County SC — on hiatus
- Golden Goal Sports SC — on hiatus
- Macca Ballers FC — on hiatus
- St. Petersburg FC Aztecs — on hiatus

Joined Florida South Division
- Gold Coast Inter AFC — joined from Beaches Adult Soccer League
- International Soccer Association — new senior team of youth club
- FSI Vultures FC — new club
- Palm Beach Spartans — joined from American Premier Soccer League
- Sharks FC — new senior team of youth club
- UD Miami FC — joined from American Premier Soccer League

Left Florida South Division

- Broncos United FC — on hiatus
- Hialeah City FC — on hiatus
- Miami Dade FC — on hiatus
- Pinecrest SC — on hiatus

Joined Mid-Atlantic North Division

- Catrachos De INCAEF — transferred from Northeast Conference American Division
- Germantown City FC — joined from local amateur play
- Northern Virginia FC — new club

Joined Mid-Atlantic South Division

- San Lee FC — new senior team of youth club
- Soda City FC — new club
- Union FC — new senior team of youth club

Left Mid-Atlantic Division

- Atlanta ASA FC
- Bragg FC
- Lowcountry United FC — on hiatus

Joined SoCal North Division

- Cal FC — returned from hiatus; last played 2016 Spring season
- FC Santa Clarita — formed from merger of Santa Clarita Storm and San Fernando Valley Scorpions
- Kern County Mustangs FC — promoted from Championship
- San Nicolas FC — promoted from Championship

Joined SoCal South Division

- Cuervos FC — joined from California Champions League
- Gremio FC San Diego — new club
- OC Real Force SC — promoted from Championship and rebranded from CF Cachorros USA
- Orange County FC 2 — returned from hiatus; last played 2017 Fall season
- San Diego Zest FC — returned from hiatus; last played 2017 Fall season

Left SoCal Division

- La Máquina FC
- L.A. Galaxy OC PSC
- Ontario Fury II
- San Fernando Valley Scorpions — merged with Santa Clarita Storm to form FC Santa Clarita
- Santa Clarita Storm — merged with San Fernando Valley Scorpions to form FC Santa Clarita

Joined Wild West North Division

- Azteca FC — returned from hiatus; last played 2017 Fall season
- Vacaville Elite — joined from LIGA NorCal

Left Wild West Division

- AFC San Francisco Hearts — on hiatus
- California Victory FC — on hiatus
- Southern Oregon Starphire FC — on hiatus
- Redding Royals FC — on hiatus
- Visalia Golden Bears

Rebranded

- Interunited Academy rebranded from Internacional USA
- Oakland Stompers rebranded from East Bay FC Tecos Fire

=== Competition format ===
Teams are divided into five conferences, some of which are further subdivided into divisions. Unless specified otherwise, all playoff matches are contested over a single leg, hosted by the team with the best points-per-game ratio. Extra time is not used in any round; matches drawn after 90 minutes advance directly to a penalty shootout.

- Central Conference: Teams are divided into Heart, North, and South divisions. Each division plays a double round robin for 14, 12, and 10 matches respectively. The top two teams from each division plus the two best third place teams by points-per-game qualify for the playoffs.
- Colorado Conference: Teams play a double round robin in a single division for eight matches. The top four teams qualify for the playoffs.
- Mountain Conference: Teams play a double round robin in a single division for four matches. The top two teams qualify for the playoffs.
- Southeast Conference: Teams are divided into Mid-Atlantic, Florida Central, and Florida South divisions. Each division determines its own champion. The champions of the Florida divisions then play, with the winner facing the champion of the Mid-Atlantic division to determine the conference champion.
  - Florida Central Division: Teams play a double round robin for 14 matches. The top seven teams qualify for the playoffs with the division leader receiving a bye to the divisional semifinals.
  - Florida South Division: Teams play a single round robin for 13 matches. The top eight teams qualify for the playoffs.
  - Mid-Atlantic Division: Teams are further divided into north and south sections. Each section plays a double round robin for eight and ten matches respectively. The top eight teams by points-per-game across both sections qualify for the playoffs.
- Western Conference: Teams are divided into SoCal and Wild West divisions. Each division determines its own champion with the two divisional champions then matched up to determine the conference champion.
  - SoCal Division: Teams are further divided into north and south sections. Each section plays a single round robin for eight matches. The top three teams in each section qualify for the playoffs, with the section leaders receiving byes to the divisional semifinals. The last placed team in each section is relegated to the Championship.
  - Wild West Division: Teams are further divided into north and south sections. Each section plays a double round robin for eight matches. The top two teams in each division qualify for the playoffs, with the top seed in each section hosting the second seed in the other section.
- National Playoffs: The champions of the Colorado and Mountain conferences play. The winner of that match then plays the champion of the Western conference while the champions of the Central and Southeast conferences play. The two winners then contest the national championship.

=== Standings ===
==== Heart Division ====
Pos	Team	Pld	W	D	L	GF	GA	GD	Pts	Qualification
1	San Antonio Runners SC	14	11	3	0	53	14	+39	36	Qualification for the Central Conference playoffs
2	Round Rock SC	14	9	3	2	37	14	+23	30	Qualification for the Central Conference playoffs
3	FC Waco	14	7	6	1	44	13	+31	27	Qualification for the Central Conference playoffs
4	FC Thunder Boerne	14	8	2	4	35	25	+10	26	
5	Coyotes FC	14	5	3	6	31	23	+8	18	
6	Austin Real Cuauhtemoc	14	4	2	8	20	30	−10	14	
7	FC Knights	14	2	1	11	8	87	−79	7	
8	Major Academy Competitive FC	14	0	0	14	1	23	−22	0	

Rules for classification: 1) Points; 2) Goal difference; 3) Goals scored; 4) Head-to-head points; 5) Head-to-head goal difference; 6) Head-to-head goals scored; 7) Head-to-head matches won; 8) Playoff

==== North Division ====
Pos	Team	Pld	W	D	L	GF	GA	GD	Pts	Qualification
1	Dallas Elite FC	12	10	1	1	43	10	+33	31	Qualification for the Central Conference playoffs
2	Inocentes FC	12	8	2	2	39	15	+24	26	Qualification for the Central Conference playoffs
3	Irving City FC	12	7	1	4	31	17	+14	22	Qualification for the Central Conference playoffs
4	FC Denton	12	5	1	6	22	33	−11	16	
5	Keene FC	12	4	1	7	26	26	0	13	
6	Terrell FC	12	2	3	7	18	44	−26	9	Relegation to the Championship
7	Dallas City FC	12	1	1	10	17	51	−34	4	Relegation to the Championship

Rules for classification: 1) Points; 2) Goal difference; 3) Goals scored; 4) Head-to-head points; 5) Head-to-head goal difference; 6) Head-to-head goals scored; 7) Head-to-head matches won; 8) Playoff

==== South Division ====
Pos	Team	Pld	W	D	L	GF	GA	GD	Pts	Qualification
1	Atletico Katy	10	9	0	1	44	5	+39	27	Qualification for the Central Conference playoffs
2	Houston FC	10	6	1	3	26	19	+7	19	Qualification for the Central Conference playoffs
3	Samba FC San Antonio	10	4	1	5	22	19	+3	13	
4	FC Imperial	10	4	1	5	21	28	−7	13	
5	Bay Area Oilers FC	10	4	1	5	24	32	−8	13	
6	Armadillos FC	10	0	2	8	16	50	−34	2	

Rules for classification: 1) Points; 2) Goal difference; 3) Goals scored; 4) Head-to-head points; 5) Head-to-head goal difference; 6) Head-to-head goals scored; 7) Head-to-head matches won; 8) Playoff

==== Colorado Conference ====
Pos	Team	Pld	W	D	L	GF	GA	GD	Pts	Qualification
1	Logroñes Denver SC	8	7	1	0	31	11	+20	22	Qualification for the Colorado Conference playoffs
2	GAM United FC	8	4	2	2	27	13	+14	14	Qualification for the Colorado Conference playoffs
3	Colorado Rush	8	3	2	3	18	18	0	11	Qualification for the Colorado Conference playoffs
4	Bright Stars of Colorado SC	8	2	0	6	10	32	−22	6	Qualification for the Colorado Conference playoffs
5	Indios Denver FC	8	1	1	6	10	22	−12	4	

Rules for classification: 1) Points; 2) Goal difference; 3) Goals scored; 4) Head-to-head points; 5) Head-to-head goal difference; 6) Head-to-head goals scored; 7) Head-to-head matches won; 8) Playoff

==== Mountain Conference ====
Pos	Team	Pld	W	D	L	GF	GA	GD	Pts	Qualification
1	San Juan FC	4	4	0	0	19	6	+13	12	Qualification for the Mountain Conference playoffs
2	Boise Cutthroats FC	4	2	0	2	14	9	+5	6	Qualification for the Mountain Conference playoffs
3	Utah Saints FC	4	0	0	4	1	19	−18	0	

Rules for classification: 1) Points; 2) Goal difference; 3) Goals scored; 4) Head-to-head points; 5) Head-to-head goal difference; 6) Head-to-head goals scored; 7) Head-to-head matches won; 8) Playoff

==== Florida Central Division ====
Pos	Team	Pld	W	D	L	GF	GA	GD	Pts	Qualification
1	America SC	13	13	0	0	77	11	+66	39	Qualification for the Florida Central Division playoffs semifinals
2	The Institute FC	14	9	1	4	39	17	+22	28	Qualification for the Florida Central Division playoffs quarterfinals
3	Sporting Orlando	14	9	1	4	43	24	+19	28	Qualification for the Florida Central Division playoffs quarterfinals
4	Deportivo Lake Mary	14	9	1	4	31	33	−2	28	Qualification for the Florida Central Division playoffs quarterfinals
5	Interunited Academy	14	7	1	6	45	33	+12	22	Qualification for the Florida Central Division playoffs quarterfinals
6	Huracan ECUSA FC	13	3	0	10	18	44	−26	9	Qualification for the Florida Central Division playoffs quarterfinals
7	Instituto Atletico FC	13	2	0	11	10	72	−62	6	Qualification for the Florida Central Division playoffs quarterfinals
8	Winter Haven United FC	13	0	0	13	10	39	−29	0	

Rules for classification: 1) Points; 2) Goal difference; 3) Goals scored; 4) Head-to-head points; 5) Head-to-head goal difference; 6) Head-to-head goals scored; 7) Head-to-head matches won; 8) Playoff

==== Florida South Division ====
Pos	Team	Pld	W	D	L	GF	GA	GD	Pts	Qualification
1	Florida Soccer Soldiers	12	11	0	1	56	6	+50	33	Qualification for the Florida South Division playoffs
2	Miami Sun FC	11	10	0	1	52	11	+41	30	Qualification for the Florida South Division playoffs
3	Jupiter United SC	13	9	1	3	43	31	+12	28	Qualification for the Florida South Division playoffs
4	Hebraica Miami FC	13	7	3	3	43	31	+12	24	Qualification for the Florida South Division playoffs
5	Hurricane FC	13	7	2	4	41	28	+13	23	Qualification for the Florida South Division playoffs
6	Palm Beach Spartans	13	7	0	6	37	28	+9	21	Qualification for the Florida South Division playoffs
7	FSI Vultures FC	13	6	2	5	31	21	+10	20	Qualification for the Florida South Division playoffs
8	Gold Coast Inter AFC	13	6	0	7	31	31	0	18	Qualification for the Florida South Division playoffs
9	International Soccer Association	13	5	3	5	25	32	−7	18	
10	Miami Wolves FC	11	4	0	7	22	20	+2	12	
11	UD Miami FC	10	3	1	6	26	27	−1	10	
12	Sharks FC	11	2	0	9	13	43	−30	6	
13	Fullersfield FC Lions	12	1	0	11	8	55	−47	3	
14	West Park FC	12	1	0	11	8	72	−64	3	

Rules for classification: 1) Points; 2) Goal difference; 3) Goals scored; 4) Head-to-head points; 5) Head-to-head goal difference; 6) Head-to-head goals scored; 7) Head-to-head matches won; 8) Playoff

==== Mid-Atlantic Division North ====
Pos	Team	Pld	W	D	L	GF	GA	GD	Pts	Qualification
1	Northern Virginia FC	8	7	1	0	27	6	+21	22	Qualification for the Mid-Atlantic Division playoffs
2	Germantown City FC	8	6	1	1	22	5	+17	19	Qualification for the Mid-Atlantic Division playoffs
3	FC Cardinals	8	3	0	5	12	19	−7	9	Qualification for the Mid-Atlantic Division playoffs
4	Catrachos De INCAEF	7	1	0	6	5	16	−11	3	
5	C-Ville FC	7	1	0	6	5	25	−20	3	

Rules for classification: 1) Points; 2) Goal difference; 3) Goals scored; 4) Head-to-head points; 5) Head-to-head goal difference; 6) Head-to-head goals scored; 7) Head-to-head matches won; 8) Playoff

==== Mid-Atlantic Division South ====
Pos	Team	Pld	W	D	L	GF	GA	GD	Pts	Qualification
1	San Lee FC	10	7	0	3	33	21	+12	21	Qualification for the Mid-Atlantic Division playoffs
2	Savannah Clovers FC	10	7	0	3	30	20	+10	21	Qualification for the Mid-Atlantic Division playoffs
3	Soda City FC	10	6	2	2	23	15	+8	20	Qualification for the Mid-Atlantic Division playoffs
4	Union FC	10	2	3	5	12	16	−4	9	Qualification for the Mid-Atlantic Division playoffs
5	Sparta 20/20 FC	10	2	3	5	18	26	−8	9	Qualification for the Mid-Atlantic Division playoffs
6	Broncos United FC NC	10	1	2	7	18	36	−18	5	

Rules for classification: 1) Points; 2) Goal difference; 3) Goals scored; 4) Head-to-head points; 5) Head-to-head goal difference; 6) Head-to-head goals scored; 7) Head-to-head matches won; 8) Playoff

==== SoCal Division North ====
Pos	Team	Pld	W	D	L	GF	GA	GD	Pts	Qualification
1	Cal FC	7	6	1	0	29	6	+23	19	
2	L.A. Wolves FC	7	6	0	1	20	9	+11	18	Qualification for the SoCal Division playoffs semifinals
3	Sporting San Fernando	7	4	2	1	21	13	+8	14	Qualification for the SoCal Division playoffs quarterfinals
4	Kern County Mustangs FC	7	4	0	3	18	13	+5	12	Qualification for the SoCal Division playoffs quarterfinals
5	Lionside FC	7	3	1	3	17	16	+1	10	
6	FC Santa Clarita	7	1	1	5	9	20	−11	4	
7	Valley United SC	7	0	2	5	4	23	−19	2	
8	Panamerican FC (R)	7	0	1	6	5	23	−18	1	Relegation to the Championship
9	San Nicolas FC	0	0	0	0	0	0	0	0	Withdrew

Rules for classification: 1) Points; 2) Goal difference; 3) Goals scored; 4) Head-to-head points; 5) Head-to-head goal difference; 6) Head-to-head goals scored; 7) Head-to-head matches won; 8) Playoff
(R) Relegated

==== SoCal Division South ====
Pos	Team	Pld	W	D	L	GF	GA	GD	Pts	Qualification
1	California United FC II	8	8	0	0	53	1	+52	24	Qualification for the SoCal Division playoffs semifinals
2	Santa Ana Winds FC	8	6	0	2	19	10	+9	18	Qualification for the SoCal Division playoffs quarterfinals
3	Orange County FC 2	8	5	1	2	21	10	+11	16	Qualification for the SoCal Division playoffs quarterfinals
4	San Diego Premier Pros FC	8	4	2	2	21	17	+4	14	
5	San Diego Zest FC	8	4	1	3	21	23	−2	13	
6	Cuervos FC	8	3	0	5	9	21	−12	9	
7	Newcastle United FC	8	2	0	6	10	19	−9	6	
8	Gremio FC San Diego	8	1	1	6	11	32	−21	4	
9	OC Real Force SC (R)	8	0	1	7	5	37	−32	1	Relegation to the Championship

Rules for classification: 1) Points; 2) Goal difference; 3) Goals scored; 4) Head-to-head points; 5) Head-to-head goal difference; 6) Head-to-head goals scored; 7) Head-to-head matches won; 8) Playoff
(R) Relegated

==== Wild West Division North ====
Pos	Team	Pld	W	D	L	GF	GA	GD	Pts	Qualification
1	Nevada Coyotes FC	8	6	1	1	29	6	+23	19	Qualification for the Wild West Division playoffs
2	Napa Sporting SC	8	6	0	2	13	6	+7	18	Qualification for the Wild West Division playoffs
3	Azteca FC	8	4	1	3	14	14	0	13	
4	Vacaville Elite	8	3	0	5	9	16	−7	9	
5	Chico City Rangers FC	8	0	0	8	2	25	−23	0	

Rules for classification: 1) Points; 2) Goal difference; 3) Goals scored; 4) Head-to-head points; 5) Head-to-head goal difference; 6) Head-to-head goals scored; 7) Head-to-head matches won; 8) Playoff

==== Wild West Division South ====
Pos	Team	Pld	W	D	L	GF	GA	GD	Pts	Qualification
1	JASA RWC	8	5	3	0	21	8	+13	18	Qualification for the Wild West Division playoffs
2	Oakland Stompers	8	4	2	2	25	9	+16	14	Qualification for the Wild West Division playoffs
3	Real San Jose	8	3	2	3	11	16	−5	11	
4	San Leandro United FC	8	2	3	3	14	20	−6	9	
5	Dynamos FC	8	1	0	7	7	25	−18	3	

Rules for classification: 1) Points; 2) Goal difference; 3) Goals scored; 4) Head-to-head points; 5) Head-to-head goal difference; 6) Head-to-head goals scored; 7) Head-to-head matches won; 8) Playoff

=== Playoffs ===
==== Central Conference playoffs ====
Quarterfinals
December 8 – UT - San Antonio
H1 San Antonio Runners SC	3(4)
N3 Irving City FC	3(2)
December 8 – Prestonwood Christian
N1 Dallas Elite FC	4
H3 FC Waco	0
December 8 – Matias Almeyda Training
S1 Atletico Katy	2(2)
N2 Inocentes FC	2(4)
December 9 – Round Rock Multipurpose
H2 Round Rock SC	0
S2 Houston FC	2

Semifinals
December 15 – STAR Soccer Complex
H1 San Antonio Runners SC	0
N1 Dallas Elite FC	2
December 16 – Polytechnic HS
N2 Inocentes FC	4
S2 Houston FC	1

Final
December 22 – Prestonwood Christian
N1 Dallas Elite FC	0
N2 Inocentes FC	2

==== Colorado Conference playoffs ====
Semifinals
December 2 – Five Star Stadium
1 Logroñes Denver SC	7
4 Bright Stars of Colorado SC	3
December 9 – Rangeview High School
2 GAM United FC
3 Colorado Rush

Final
December 15 – Five Star Stadium
1 Logroñes Denver SC	2
2 GAM United FC	1

==== Mountain Conference playoffs ====
Final
November 25 – Zions Bank Stadium
1 San Juan FC
2 Boise Cutthroats FC	w/o

The match originally ended 5-1 in favor of San Juan FC, but they were subsequently ruled to have fielded an ineligible player. Boise Cutthroats FC was advanced to the next round.

==== Florida Central Division playoffs ====
Quarterfinals
December 8 – Lake Mary Athletic Fields
4 Deportivo Lake Mary	2
5 Interunited Academy	1
December 7 – ESPN Wide World of Sports
2 The Institute FC	6
7 Instituto Atletico FC	0
December 9 – Celebration High School
3 Sporting Orlando	2(4)
6 Huracan ECUSA FC	2(2)

Semifinals
December 15 – West Orange HS
1 America SC	5
4 Deportivo Lake Mary	0
December 14 – ESPN Wide World of Sports
2 The Institute FC	0
3 Sporting Orlando	1

Final
December 20 – West Orange HS
1 America SC	2
3 Sporting Orlando	0

==== Florida South Division playoffs ====
Quarterfinals
December 9 – Ives Estates Park
1 Florida Soccer Soldiers	3
8 Gold Coast Inter AFC	0
December 13 – Hilltopper Stadium
4 Hebraica Miami FC	2
5 Hurricane FC	3
December 8 – Ives Estates Park
2 Miami Sun FC	9
7 FSI Vultures FC	2
December 8 – Ives Estates Park
3 Jupiter United SC	2
6 Palm Beach Spartans	4

Semifinals
December 16 – Ives Estates Park
1 Florida Soccer Soldiers	5
5 Hurricane FC	0
December 15 – Ives Estates Park
2 Miami Sun FC	1
6 Palm Beach Spartans	0

Final
December 21 – Ives Estates Park
1 Florida Soccer Soldiers	2(3)
2 Miami Sun FC	2(4)

==== Mid-Atlantic Division playoffs ====
Quarterfinals
December 8 – Evergreen Sportsplex
1 Northern Virginia FC	1(4)
8 Sparta 20/20 FC	1(3)
December 9 – Memorial Stadium
4 Savannah Clovers FC	3
5 Soda City FC	0
December 8 – Laytonia Park
2 Germantown City FC	3
7 Union FC	1
December 8 – Lee County High School
3 San Lee FC	1
6 FC Cardinals	0

Semifinals
December 15 – BB&T Soccer Park
1 Northern Virginia FC	2
4 Savannah Clovers FC	1
December 15 – BB&T Soccer Park
2 Germantown City FC	4
3 San Lee FC	2

Final
December 16 – BB&T Soccer Park
1 Northern Virginia FC	2
2 Germantown City FC	3

==== SoCal Division playoffs ====
Quarterfinals
December 8 – LA Harbor College
S2 Santa Ana Winds FC	1
N3 Kern County Mustangs	2
December 8 – LA Harbor College
N2 Sporting San Fernando	2
S3 Orange County FC 2	4

Semifinals
December 15 – OC Great Park
S1 California United FC II	11
N3 Kern County Mustangs FC	0
December 16 – OC Great Park
N1 L.A. Wolves FC	2
S3 Orange County FC 2	3

Final
January 4 – OC Great Park
S1 California United FC II	6
S3 Orange County FC 2	1

==== Wild West Division playoffs ====
Semifinals
December 8 – Damonte Ranch HS
N1 Nevada Coyotes FC	3
S2 Oakland Stompers	0
December 8 – Red Morton Park
S1 JASA RWC	2
N2 Napa Sporting SC	1

Final
December 15 – Damonte Ranch HS
N1 Nevada Coyotes FC	0
S1 JASA RWC	1

==== National playoffs ====
Conference Semifinal
January 13 – West Orange High School
FC America SC	1(6)
FS Miami Sun FC	1(7)

National Quarterfinal & Conference Finals
January 13 – Lindsay High School
SC California United FC II	1
WW JASA RWC	0
January 6
CO Logroñes Denver SC	w/o
M Boise Cutthroats FC
January 18 – West Orange High School
FS Miami Sun FC	1
MA Germantown City FC	2

National Semifinals
January 26 – Orange County Great Park
W California United FC II	9
CO Logroñes Denver SC	1
January 26 – Memorial Stadium
SE Germantown City FC	1
C Inocentes FC	3

National Final
February 9 – LA Harbor College
W California United FC II	1(4)
C Inocentes FC	1(2)

== Championship ==
=== Southeast Conference ===
==== Florida Central Division ====
The following 7 clubs joined the division for its inaugural season

- CD Miguelense
- Independiente FC
- Instituto Atletico FC II
- Millos United FC
- Nationwide FC
- The A Team
- Valencia College FC

===== Standings =====
Pos	Team	Pld	W	D	L	GF	GA	GD	Pts
1	Nationwide FC	8	6	2	0	38	17	+21	20
2	The A Team	8	5	1	2	42	18	+24	16
3	Independiente FC	7	4	2	1	19	13	+6	14
4	Millos United FC	7	2	2	3	21	25	−4	8
5	CD Miguelense	8	2	0	6	18	34	−16	6
6	Valencia College FC	7	1	2	4	12	22	−10	5
7	Instituto Atletico FC II	7	1	1	5	8	29	−21	4

Updated to match(es) played on November 11, 2018. Source:
Rules for classification: 1) Points; 2) Goal difference; 3) Goals scored; 4) Head-to-head points; 5) Head-to-head goal difference; 6) Head-to-head goals scored; 7) Head-to-head matches won; 8) Playoff

=== Western Conference ===
==== SoCal Division ====
===== SoCal North Division =====
The following 4 northern SoCal Championship clubs left the division before the season

- Kern County Mustangs FC — promoted to Pro Premier
- San Nicolas FC — promoted to Pro Premier
- USA/MEX SoCal
- USA Soccer Stars FC

The following 5 clubs joined the division before the season

- CD Independiente
- San Fernando Valley FC — returned from hiatus; last played 2017 Fall season
- Sporting San Fernando II — new reserve team of Pro Premier club
- Warriors FC — new club
- Xolos Academy L.A.

The following club rebranded before the season

- LA 10 FC — rebranded from L.A. Roma FC

====== Standings ======
Pos	Team	Pld	W	D	L	GF	GA	GD	Pts	Qualification
1	LA 10 FC (P)	10	8	1	1	44	11	+33	25	Promotion to the Pro Premier
2	Newhall Premier FC	10	8	1	1	27	7	+20	25	Qualification for the SoCal Championship Division Playoffs
3	Warriors FC	10	8	0	2	34	16	+18	24	Qualification for the SoCal Championship Division Playoffs
4	Revolution FC	10	6	1	3	24	21	+3	19	
5	San Fernando Valley FC	10	5	2	3	15	10	+5	17	
6	Bell Gardens FC	9	3	1	5	15	21	−6	10	
7	High Desert FC	9	3	1	5	14	26	−12	10	
8	Xolos Academy L.A.	10	3	0	7	16	21	−5	9	
9	Tiburones Rojos USA	10	2	2	6	13	33	−20	8	
10	CD Independiente	9	1	3	5	15	24	−9	6	
11	Sporting San Fernando II	9	0	0	9	11	38	−27	0	

Rules for classification: 1) Points; 2) Goal difference; 3) Goals scored; 4) Head-to-head points; 5) Head-to-head goal difference; 6) Head-to-head goals scored; 7) Head-to-head matches won; 8) Playoff
(P) Promoted

===== SoCal South Division =====
The following 3 southern SoCal Championship clubs left the division before the season

- CF Cachorros USA — promoted to Pro Premier
- L.A. Galaxy OC PSC II
- La Habra City FC

The following 2 clubs joined the division before the season

- California Rush SC — new senior team of youth club
- City Legends FC — new club

The following club rebranded before the season

- Santa Ana Winds FC II — rebranded from MX Dream SC

====== Standings ======
Pos	Team	Pld	W	D	L	GF	GA	GD	Pts	Qualification
1	City Legends FC (P)	10	8	2	0	25	11	+14	26	Promotion to the Pro Premier
2	Inland Empire FC (P)	10	7	1	2	28	8	+20	22	Qualification for the SoCal Championship Division Playoffs
3	Disciples FC	10	5	4	1	24	12	+12	19	Qualification for the SoCal Championship Division Playoffs
4	Anaheim Legacy FC	10	6	1	3	18	9	+9	19	
5	SoCal Troop FC	10	6	0	4	24	16	+8	18	
6	Santa Ana Winds FC II	10	6	0	4	22	17	+5	18	
7	California Rush SC	10	5	1	4	30	20	+10	16	
8	Newport FC	10	2	2	6	13	26	−13	8	
9	Anaheim FC	10	2	1	7	17	37	−20	7	
10	Toros Neza USA	10	1	0	9	18	28	−10	3	
11	Fontana International SC	10	1	0	9	17	52	−35	3	

Rules for classification: 1) Points; 2) Goal difference; 3) Goals scored; 4) Head-to-head points; 5) Head-to-head goal difference; 6) Head-to-head goals scored; 7) Head-to-head matches won; 8) Playoff
(P) Promoted

===== Playoffs =====
Semifinals
December 8 – Grand Terrace HS
S2 Inland Empire FC	3
N3 Warriors FC	1
December 9 – Lake Forest Sports Park
N2 Newhall Premier FC	0
S3 Disciples FC	5

Final
December 16 – Grand Terrace HS
S2 Inland Empire FC	4
S3 Disciples FC	0
