= 2017 Fall UPSL season =

United Premier Soccer League
- Season: 2017 Fall
- Champions: OC Invicta FC

The 2017 Fall United Premier Soccer League season was the 9th season of the UPSL.

== Western Conference ==
=== Western Pro Premier ===
The following 7 clubs left the division before the season

- Avalanche FC
- L.A. Highlanders FC
- Mesoamerica FC
- Newhall Premier — relegated to Championship Division
- Ozzy's Laguna FC
- San Nicolas FC
- USA Soccer Stars FC

The following 5 clubs joined the division before the season

- Bell Gardens FC — promoted from Championship Division
- OC Invicta FC — new reserve team of North American Soccer League club
- Orange County FC 2 — new reserve team of National Premier Soccer League club
- San Diego Zest FC 2 — new reserve team of Premier Development League club
- Vanquish FC — new team

==== Standings ====
Pos	Team	Pld	W	D	L	GF	GA	GD	Pts	Qualification
1	OC Invicta	14	12	2	0	61	6	+55	38	Qualification for the Western Pro Premier Playoffs Finals
2	Orange County FC 2	14	11	1	2	45	16	+29	34	Qualification for the Western Pro Premier Playoffs Finals
3	Santa Ana Winds FC	14	9	4	1	60	23	+37	31	Qualification for the Western Pro Premier Playoffs Semifinals
4	La Máquina FC	13	8	3	2	46	27	+19	27	Qualification for the Western Pro Premier Playoffs Semifinals
5	Santa Clarita Storm	14	8	1	5	40	32	+8	25	Qualification for the Western Pro Premier Playoffs Semifinals
6	L.A. Wolves FC	13	7	3	3	32	13	+19	24	Qualification for the Western Pro Premier Playoffs Semifinals
7	Sporting San Fernando	14	6	1	7	26	25	+1	19	
8	San Diego Zest FC 2	14	5	3	6	28	43	−15	18	
9	Strikers FC South Coast	14	4	4	6	24	29	−5	16	
10	SFV Scorpions FC	14	4	4	6	20	31	−11	16	
11	PSC Football Club	13	4	3	6	27	35	−8	15	
12	Valley United SC	14	4	1	9	15	52	−37	13	
13	Anaheim Legacy FC	13	3	0	10	15	54	−39	9	Relegation to the 2018 Western Championship
14	Bell Gardens FC	13	2	2	9	21	49	−28	8	Relegation to the 2018 Western Championship
15	Vanquish FC	14	0	0	14	2	26	−24	0	Relegation to the 2018 Western Championship

Rules for classification: 1) points; 2) goal differential; 3) wins; 4) win percentage

==== Playoffs ====
Semifinal			Final
			1	OC Invicta FC	4
4	La Maquina FC	6	4	La Maquina FC	0
5	Santa Clarita Storm	3

OC Invicta FC advance to the national playoffs.

Semifinal			Final
			2	Orange County FC 2	2(5)
3	Santa Ana Winds FC	4	3	Santa Ana Winds FC	2(6)
6	L.A. Wolves FC	1

Santa Ana Winds FC advance to the national playoffs.

=== Western Championship ===
The following 6 clubs left the division before the season

- Bell Gardens FC — promoted to Pro Premier Division
- FC Golden State Force U23
- High Desert United
- Irvine Outcasts SC
- L.A. Sharks FC
- OC Crew SC

The following 8 clubs joined the division before the season

- Black Gold Oil FC — new team
- L.A. Roma FC — new team
- Lionside FC — joined from South Bay Sports League
- Long Beach City FC — returned from 3 season hiatus
- Newcastle United FC — returned from 1 season hiatus
- Newhall Premier — relegated from Championship Division
- Pacific Side FC — new team
- San Fernando Valley FC

The following club was rebranded before the season

- L.A. Wolves FC (Reserves) rebranded from L.A. W17 FC

==== Standings ====
Pos	Team	Pld	W	D	L	GF	GA	GD	Pts	Qualification
1	Lionside FC	19	17	2	0	79	18	+61	53	Promotion to the 2018 Western Pro Premier
2	Newcastle United FC	19	15	1	3	41	18	+23	46	Promotion to the 2018 Western Pro Premier
3	Tiburones Rojos USA	19	13	3	3	60	26	+34	42	Qualification for the Western Championship Promotion Playoffs
4	Toros Neza USA	19	13	3	3	47	23	+24	42	Qualification for the Western Championship Promotion Playoffs
5	Panamerican FC	19	12	3	4	48	32	+16	39	Qualification for the Western Championship Promotion Playoffs
6	CF Cachorros USA	19	11	3	5	55	41	+14	36	Qualification for the Western Championship Promotion Playoffs
7	Pacific Side FC	19	11	2	6	54	24	+30	35	
8	SoCal Troop FC	19	10	5	4	56	34	+22	35	
9	Fontana International SC	19	9	5	5	36	30	+6	32	
10	San Fernando Valley FC	19	8	4	7	41	36	+5	28	
11	L.A. Roma FC	19	7	6	6	36	40	−4	27	
12	Newport FC	19	7	3	9	41	43	−2	24	
13	Del Rey City SC	19	7	1	11	26	62	−36	22	
14	Strikers FC South Coast (Reserves)	19	5	3	11	34	50	−16	18	
15	Long Beach City FC	19	4	2	13	17	41	−24	14	
16	L.A. Wolves FC (Reserves)	19	4	1	14	20	56	−36	13	
17	Newhall Premier FC	19	4	1	14	20	58	−38	13	
18	UFA Hawks	19	3	3	13	17	31	−14	12	
19	Atlas USA FC	19	3	1	15	21	67	−46	10	
20	Black Gold Oil FC	19	0	0	19	0	19	−19	0	

Rules for classification: 1) points; 2) goal differential; 3) wins; 4) win percentage

==== Promotion Playoffs ====
Semifinals
3	Tiburones Rojos USA	0(11)
6	C.F. Cachorros USA	0(10)
4	Toros Neza USA	1
5	Panamerican FC	4

Finals
3	Tiburones Rojos USA	1
5	Panamerican FC	3

Panamerican FC was promoted to the Pro Premier Division.

== Wild West Conference ==
The following 3 clubs left the conference before the season

- Boise FC — transferred to Desert Mountain Conference
- IFX Ballistic
- Magic Valley FC

=== Wild West Blue Division ===
The following club joined the division before the season

- Azteca FC

==== Standings ====
Pos	Team	Pld	W	D	L	GF	GA	GD	Pts	Qualification
1	California Victory FC	8	7	0	1	20	10	+10	21	Qualification for the Wild West Playoffs
2	FC Sacramento	8	4	1	3	17	12	+5	13	Qualification for the Wild West Playoffs
3	Azteca FC	8	4	1	3	14	10	+4	13	
4	Western Nevada FC	8	2	3	3	8	8	0	9	
5	CD Aguiluchos USA U23	8	0	1	7	12	31	−19	1	

Rules for classification: 1) points; 2) goal differential; 3) wins; 4) win percentage

=== Wild West Red Division ===
The following 3 clubs joined the division before the season

- Dynamos FC
- East Bay FC Stompers Juniors
- JASA RWC

==== Standings ====
Pos	Team	Pld	W	D	L	GF	GA	GD	Pts	Qualification
1	East Bay FC Stompers Juniors	8	6	1	1	31	18	+13	19	Qualification for Wild West Playoffs
2	Real San Jose	8	4	2	2	11	12	−1	14	Qualification for Wild West Playoffs
3	JASA RWC	8	4	0	4	21	12	+9	12	
4	Dynamos FC	8	3	1	4	11	16	−5	10	
5	Oakland Pamperos	8	1	0	7	8	24	−16	3	

Rules for classification: 1) points; 2) goal differential; 3) wins; 4) win percentage

=== Wild West Playoffs ===
Finals
R1	East Bay FC Stompers Juniors	5
B2	FC Sacramento	1

East Bay FC Stompers Juniors advance to the national playoffs.

Finals
B1	California Victory	1
R2	Real San Jose	3

Real San Jose advance to the national playoffs.

== Desert Mountain Conference ==
The following 8 clubs joined the conference for its inaugural season

- Boise FC — transferred from Northwest Conference
- Las Vegas City FC — transferred from Nevada Conference
- Las Vegas Mobsters — transferred from Nevada Conference
- Las Vegas Soccer Club
- Logan United FC
- Provo Premier
- San Juan FC
- Sporting AZ FC — transferred from Arizona Conference

=== Standings ===
Pos	Team	Pld	W	D	L	GF	GA	GD	Pts	Qualification
1	Boise FC	12	8	3	1	34	16	+18	27	Qualification for the Desert Mountain Playoffs
2	San Juan FC	11	8	2	1	26	9	+17	26	Qualification for the Desert Mountain Playoffs
3	Las Vegas Soccer Club	10	7	1	2	27	11	+16	22	Qualification for the Desert Mountain Playoffs
4	Provo Premier	10	5	1	4	11	18	−7	16	Qualification for the Desert Mountain Playoffs
5	Las Vegas City FC	10	4	3	3	9	9	0	15	
6	Logan United FC	11	2	0	9	3	28	−25	6	
7	Sporting AZ FC	9	0	2	7	0	7	−7	2	
8	Las Vegas Mobsters	9	0	2	7	0	12	−12	2	

Rules for classification: 1) points; 2) goal differential; 3) wins; 4) win percentage

=== Playoffs ===
Finals
1	Boise FC
4	Las Vegas City FC

Boise FC advance to the national playoffs.

Finals
2	Las Vegas Soccer Club
3	San Juan FC

Las Vegas Soccer Club advance to the national playoffs.

== Colorado Conference ==
=== Colorado Pro Premier ===
The Pro Premier Division consisted of the same 8 clubs as in the previous season.

==== Standings ====
Pos	Team	Pld	W	D	L	GF	GA	GD	Pts	Qualification
1	FC Boulder	14	10	3	1	34	17	+17	33	Qualification for the Colorado Pro Premier Playoffs
2	Indios Denver FC	14	8	5	1	37	17	+20	29	Qualification for the Colorado Pro Premier Playoffs
3	Colorado Rush	14	6	3	5	27	24	+3	21	Qualification for the Colorado Pro Premier Playoffs
4	Logroñes Denver SC	14	5	5	4	27	28	−1	20	Qualification for the Colorado Pro Premier Playoffs
5	Colorado Springs FC	14	5	3	6	22	23	−1	18	
6	Club El Azul	14	4	3	7	25	30	−5	15	
7	FC Greeley	14	3	2	9	20	40	−20	11	
8	FC United	14	2	2	10	14	27	−13	8	

Rules for classification: 1) points; 2) goal differential; 3) wins; 4) win percentage

==== Playoffs ====
Semifinals
1	FC Boulder	1
4	Logroñes SC	2
2	Indios Denver FC	1
3	CO Rush	0

Finals
4	Logroñes SC	2
2	Indios Denver FC	6

Indios Denver FC advance to the national playoffs.

=== Colorado Championship Division ===
The following 5 clubs joined the division for its inaugural season

- Denver Metro FC
- GAM United FC
- Indios Denver FC U23
- Legions FC
- Northern Colorado FC

==== Standings ====
Pos	Team	Pld	W	D	L	GF	GA	GD	Pts	Qualification
1	GAM United FC	8	6	1	1	34	10	+24	19	Promotion to the 2018 Colorado Pro Premier
2	Northern Colorado FC	8	4	1	3	16	19	−3	13	Promotion to the 2018 Colorado Pro Premier
3	Denver Metro FC	7	3	2	2	13	14	−1	11	Promotion to the 2018 Colorado Pro Premier
4	Indios Denver FC U23	7	1	3	3	8	16	−8	6	
5	Legions FC	8	1	1	6	9	21	−12	4	

Rules for classification: 1) points; 2) goal differential; 3) wins; 4) win percentage

== South Florida Conference ==
The following 7 clubs joined the conference for its inaugural season

- Broncos United FC
- FC Ginga
- Hialeah City FC
- Miami Dade FC Elite
- Miami Wolves FC
- Plantation FC
- West Park FC

=== Standings ===
Pos	Team	Pld	W	D	L	GF	GA	GD	Pts	Qualification
1	Plantation FC	6	4	1	1	18	7	+11	13	Qualification for the South Florida Playoffs
2	West Park FC	6	4	1	1	20	12	+8	13	Qualification for the South Florida Playoffs
3	Broncos United FC	6	4	1	1	13	10	+3	13	Qualification for the South Florida Playoffs
4	FC Ginga	6	2	3	1	17	11	+6	9	Qualification for the South Florida Playoffs
5	Miami Dade FC Elite	6	1	1	4	9	15	−6	4	
6	Miami Wolves FC	6	1	1	4	10	20	−10	4	
7	Hialeah City FC	6	0	2	4	7	19	−12	2	

Rules for classification: 1) points; 2) goal differential; 3) wins; 4) win percentage

=== Playoffs ===
Semifinals
1	Plantation FC
4	FC Ginga
2	West Park FC
3	Broncos United FC

Finals
4	FC Ginga	1()
3	Broncos United FC	1()

FC Ginga advance to the national playoffs.

== National Playoffs ==
Quarterfinals
Real San Jose	5
Indios Denver FC	2
OC Invicta FC	w/o
FC Ginga
Santa Ana Winds FC	3
Boise FC	1
Las Vegas Soccer Club	2
East Bay FC Stompers Juniors	5

Semifinals
Real San Jose	1
OC Invicta FC	5
Santa Ana Winds FC	2
East Bay FC Stompers Juniors	0

Final
OC Invicta FC	3
Santa Ana Winds FC	2
