= Samuel Gómez =

American soccer player

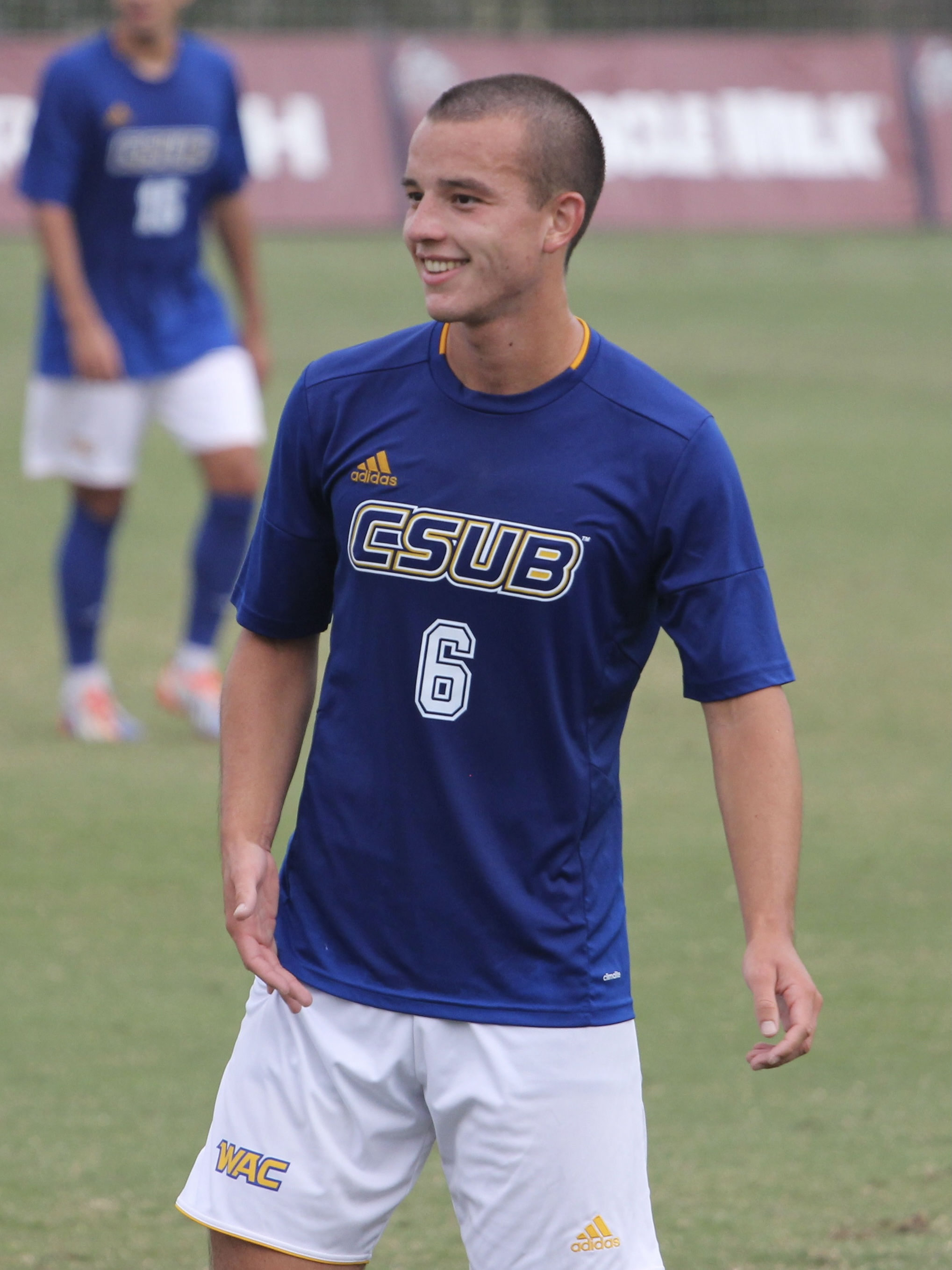
- Gómez playing for CSUB in 2016

Personal information
- Full name: Samuel Benjamin Gómez
- Date of birth: August 6, 1996 (age 30)
- Place of birth: Bremerton, Washington, United States
- Height: 5 ft 11 in (1.80 m)
- Position: Midfielder

Team information
- Current team: Real España
- Number: 17

Youth career
- 2011–2014: Washington Crossfire
- 2014–2015: Seattle Sounders FC

College career
Years	Team	Apps	(Gls)
2015–2018	Cal State Bakersfield	72	(0)

Senior career*
Years	Team	Apps	(Gls)
2017	San Diego Zest FC	13	(0)
2018	Kitsap Pumas	18	(0)
2021-	Real España	3	(0)
- * Club domestic league appearances and goals

Samuel Benjamin Gómez (born 6 August 1996) is an American soccer player who plays as a midfielder for Real España in the Liga Nacional de Fútbol de Honduras.

== Career ==
Before the 2021 season, Gómez signed for Honduran side Real España.
