= Erlys García =

Cuban footballer (born 1985)

Personal information
- Full name: Erlys García Baró
- Date of birth: July 28, 1985 (age 41)
- Place of birth: Havana, Cuba
- Height: 5 ft 11 in (1.80 m)
- Position: Defender

Team information
- Current team: San Nicolas

Senior career*
Years	Team	Apps	(Gls)
2007–2009	Ciudad de La Habana		
2010	Los Angeles Azul Legends	6	(0)
2011–2013	Los Angeles Blues	53	(0)
2014	Los Angeles Misioneros	1	(0)
2014	Orange County Blues	7	(0)
2015	LA Laguna		
2016	San Nicolas		
2017	Golden State Force	1	(0)

International career^{‡}
2008	Cuba	2	(0)
- * Club domestic league appearances and goals as of May 7, 2020 ‡ National team caps and goals as of February 6, 2011

Erlys García Baró (born July 28, 1985, in Havana) is a Cuban footballer who plays as a defender.

== Career ==
=== Cuba ===
García began his career in his native Cuba, playing with Ciudad de La Habana in the Campeonato Nacional de Fútbol de Cuba.

While playing for the Cuba U-23 national team in the Olympic qualifying tournament in Tampa, Florida, in March 2008, García—along with several other members of the team—defected to the United States under the wet foot dry foot scheme that allows Cubans who reach U.S. soil to obtain asylum.

=== United States ===
Following several unsuccessful trials with clubs such as FC Tampa Bay, García found his way to Los Angeles, and played in various LA-area amateur leagues before signing with the Los Angeles Azul Legends of the USL Premier Development League in early 2010. He made six appearances for Azul during the regular season.

In February 2011, García signed with the expansion Los Angeles Blues of the new USL Professional Division. The club announced on November 10, 2011, that Garcia would return for the 2012 season.

=== International ===
In addition to playing with the Cuba U-23 national team, García also obtained two caps with the full Cuba national team prior to his defection, in two friendlies against Guyana in February 2008.
