= San Diego Zest FC Women =

- Full name: San Diego Zest FC Women
- Founded: May 22, 2017; 7 years ago
- Ground: TBA
- Owners: San Diego Sports Authority
- League: Women's Premier Soccer League
- Website: http://www.sandiegozestfc.us/
Home colors	Away colors

San Diego Zest FC Women is an American soccer team based in San Diego, California. The club was founded in 2017. It is owned and operated by San Diego Sports Authority, a sports management company. Zest FC Women competes in the Women's Premier Soccer League.

== History ==
San Diego Zest FC Women was founded as an extension of its parent club, San Diego Zest FC, which competes in the Premier Development League and its brother team, San Diego Zest FC 2, which competes in the United Premier Soccer League. On May 22, 2017, the Women's Premier Soccer League announced that it had awarded the franchise to San Diego Zest Women.
