= LA Wolves =

LA Wolves may refer to:

- Los Angeles Wolves; member of United Soccer Association in 1967 and North American Soccer League in 1968
- L.A. Wolves FC; member of United Premier Soccer League which are based in Torrence, California and began play in 2014
