= Florida Soccer Soldiers =

- Full name: Florida Soccer Soldiers
- Founded: 2018; 7 years ago
- Ground: SDG Soccer Complex; North Miami Beach, Florida
- Head Coach: Daniel Godoy
- League: United Premier Soccer League
- 2018 Fall: Florida South Division: 1st Florida South Division Playoffs: Runners-up
- Website: http://www.floridasoccersoldiers.com/home
Home colours

Florida Soccer Soldiers is an American semi-professional soccer club based in North Miami Beach, Florida, that plays in the United Premier Soccer League. The club was established in 2018 and gained notoriety after they qualified for the third round of the 2019 U.S. Open Cup, defeating professional clubs Miami FC and Charlotte Independence.

== History ==
The Florida Soccer Soldiers were founded in 2018 and joined the United Premier Soccer League Florida South Division. During their first season, the club managed to finish top of their division and won in the playoffs, defeating Miami Sun 2–1. During the national championships, the club defeated Inocentes FC in the Quarterfinals 2–0 before falling to eventual champions, Milwaukee Bavarian, 2–0.

The next year, the Soccer Soldiers qualified for the 2019 U.S. Open Cup, the national domestic cup competition in American soccer. Their first round match was against reigning National Premier Soccer League champions Miami FC on May 9. The club managed a major upset, coming from behind to win 2–1 away from home and thus qualified for the second round. Their second-round match was against USL Championship side Charlotte Independence on May 14. The Soccer Soldiers managed to pull off another upset, defeating the second division club in a penalty shootout 5–4. The Soccer Soldiers' run ended in the third round, losing 1–0 to North Carolina FC of USL Championship.

== Management team ==
Position	Name
Head coach	(Venezuela) Daniel Godoy

== Statistics and records ==
=== Season-by-season ===
As of May 31, 2020

Season	League								Playoffs	U.S. Open Cup
Season	P	W	D	L	GF	GA	Pts	Position	Playoffs	U.S. Open Cup
2018 Spring	9	9	0	0	46	7	27	1st	NP: Semi-finals	Did not play
2018 Fall	12	11	0	1	56	6	33	1st	FS: Runners-up	Qualified
2019 Spring	9	7	1	1	22	1	22	3rd	FS: Quarterfinals	Third Round
2019 Fall	12	9	3	0	39	9	30	1st	FS: Runners-up	Second Qualifying Round
