= Carlos Aguilar =

American soccer player

Personal information
- Full name: Carlos Aguilar
- Date of birth: May 25, 1988 (age 38)
- Place of birth: Palmdale, California, United States
- Height: 5 ft 11 in (1.80 m)
- Position: Midfielder

College career
Years	Team	Apps	(Gls)
2006–2007	Taft Cougars		
2008–2009	UC Irvine Anteaters		

Senior career*
Years	Team	Apps	(Gls)
2008	Lancaster Rattlers	8	(2)
2009	Bakersfield Brigade	3	(1)
2009	Lancaster Rattlers	7	(1)
2010	Rochester Rhinos	4	(0)
2011	Los Angeles Blues 23	11	(3)

Managerial career
- 2011–2014: UC Irvine Anteaters (asst.)
- 2014–2019: Cal State Fullerton Titans (asst.)
- 2020–: San Diego State Aztecs (asst.)
- * Club domestic league appearances and goals as of November 22, 2011

Carlos Aguilar (born May 25, 1988) is an American soccer player who is currently an assistant coach at San Diego State University.

== Career ==
=== College and amateur ===
Carlos attended Palmdale High School played two years of college soccer at Taft College, where he scored both goals as his team won the 2007 California Collegiate State Soccer Championship, before transferring to the University of California, Irvine in his junior year. He scored six goals and made seven assists UCI in his senior season, and was named to the All-Big West Conference First Team.

During his college years Aguilar also played with the Lancaster Rattlers and Bakersfield Brigade in the USL Premier Development League.

=== Professional ===
Undrafted out of college, Aguilar signed with Rochester Rhinos in February 2010. He made his professional debut on April 10, 2010, in Rochester's season opening game against Miami FC, and went on to make two further appearances in his debut pro season.

Aguilar was not listed on the 2011 Rochester roster released April 12, 2011, and subsequently returned to California to play for Los Angeles Blues 23 in the USL Premier Development League.

== Honors ==
=== Rochester Rhinos ===
- USSF Division 2 Pro League Regular Season Champions (1): 2010
