= Round Rock SC =

Soccer club in Round Rock, Texas

- Full name: Round Rock Soccer Club
- Founded: 2017
- Stadium: Round Rock Multipurpose Complex
- Owner: Janna Palacios and Edgar Palacios
- League: USL League Two
- 2023: 6th, Lone Star Division; Playoffs: DNQ
- Website: https://roundrocksc.com/
Home colors	Away colors

Round Rock SC is an American semi-pro soccer club in Round Rock, Texas competing in the Lone Star Division of the Southern Conference in USL League Two. They previously played in the United Premier Soccer League in 2018 and 2019.

== History ==
Founded in 2017, the club joined the United Premier Soccer League, in the unofficial fifth tier of the United States soccer league system for the 2018 Spring UPSL season. They transferred to USL League Two, a fourth tier league, beginning in the 2021 season.

== Year-by-year ==
=== First Team ===
Year	Level	League	Reg. season	Playoffs	Open Cup
2018 Spring	5	UPSL	2nd, South	Semi-finals, Central Conference	did not enter
2018 Fall	5	UPSL	2nd, Heart	Quarter-finals, Central Conference	did not enter
2019 Spring	5	UPSL	7th, Central Heart	did not qualify	did not enter
2019 Fall	did not participate				did not enter
2020 Spring	did not participate				Not held
2020 Fall	5	UPSL	3rd, Heart	did not qualify	Not held
2021	4	USL League Two	7th, Mid South	did not qualify	Not held
2022	4	USL League Two	4th, Lone Star Division	did not qualify	did not qualify
2023	4	USL League Two	6th, Lone Star Division	did not qualify	did not qualify

=== Second Team ===
Year	League	Reg. season
2021 Spring	UPSL Premier	5th, Texas Heart
2021 Fall	UPSL Premier	10th, Texas South
2023 Fall	UPSL Division 1	2nd, Central Texas
2024 Spring	UPSL Division 1	4th, Central Texas
