= Santa Ana Water Tower =

Historic water tower in California

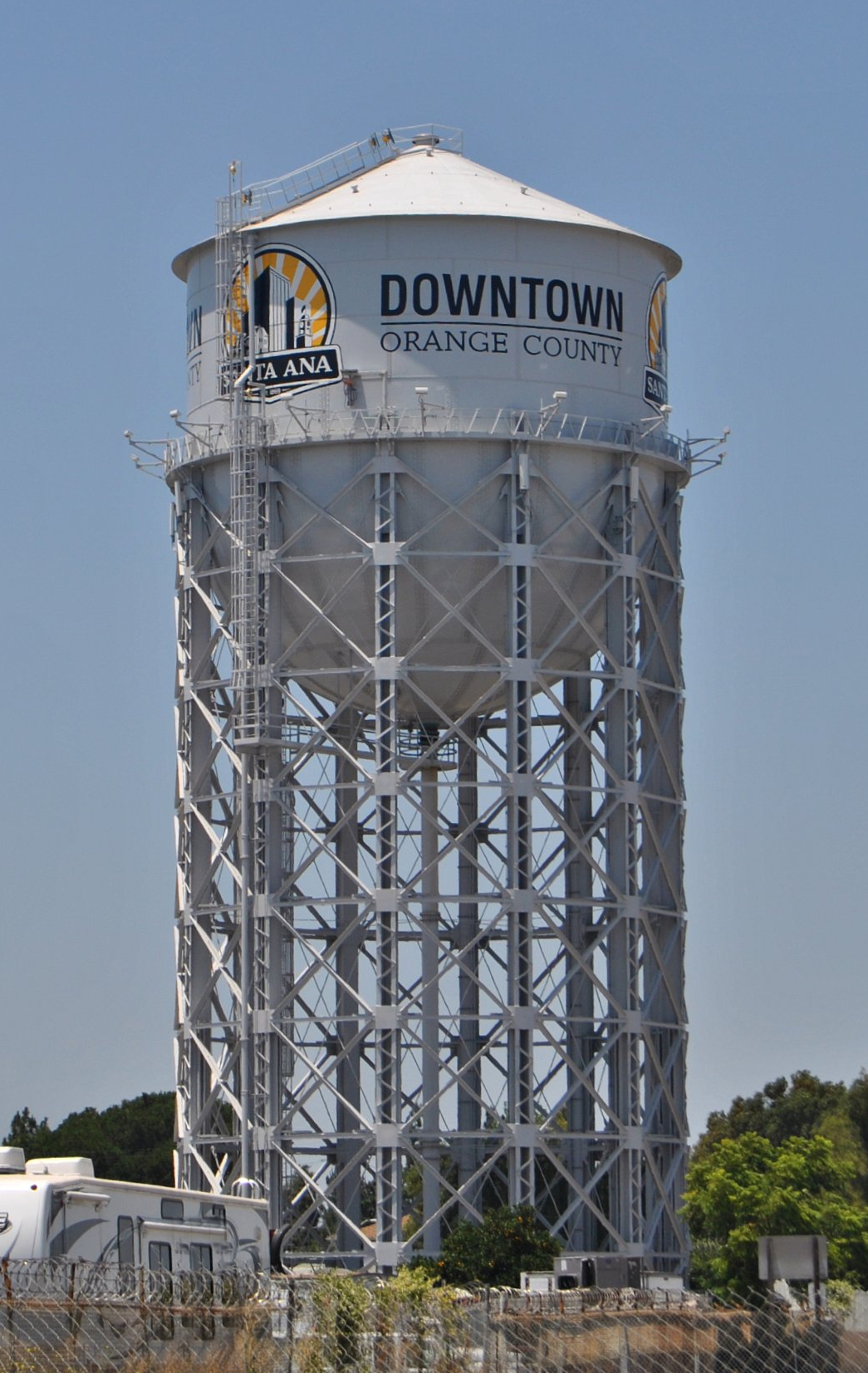
- The water tower in 2011

- Location within the Los Angeles metropolitan area Location within California Location within the United States
- 33.75780°N 117.86184°W
- Type: Water tower
- Location: 1524 Penn Way #1494, Santa Ana, CA 92701

History
- Built: 1928

Site notes
- Height: 153 ft (47 m)
- Governing body: City of Santa Ana

The Santa Ana Water Tower is a historic water tower in Santa Ana, California. A recognizable symbol of the city, it is a common sight for people passing through on the I-5.

The water tower is on the Santa Ana Register of Historic Properties List, number 253. It is designated as a "Landmark." It is frequently scaled illegally. The tower is also featured on the crest of the football club Santa Ana Winds FC.

== History ==
The water tower was built in 1928 to hold water for the 30,000 residents of Santa Ana at the time. However, once the city expanded to its present-day population of more than ten times that number, it became more of a landmark. The tower was repainted in 1990 and 2008. Ladders were also added near that time.

== Features ==
At 153 ft (47 m) tall, the water tower was designed to hold a maximum of one million gallons of water. Currently, it contains about 800,000. Internet companies pay the city to use the tower as a cell tower. The tower also contains a vent, which allows air to escape as the water fills up. The vent is sealed in order to keep out debris and animals. It meets all of California's seismic engineering standards.

The tower is illuminated with different colors, sometimes reflecting recent events, such as turning purple and gold in memory of Kobe Bryant or becoming blue and yellow in support of Ukraine during the Russian invasion of Ukraine.
