= FC Santa Clarita =

Santa Clarita Storm
- Full name: Futbol Club Santa Clarita Storm
- Nickname: Storm
- Founded: 2006 (as Lancaster Rattlers)
- Ground: Santa Clarita, California
- Owner: (United States) Gerald Brunner
- Head Coach: (United States) Oscar Moreno and Martin Rubio
- League: United Premier Soccer League
- 2013: 3rd, Southern Division; Playoffs: DNQ
- Website: http://www.santaclaritastorm.com/default.asp
Home colors	Away colors

FC Santa Clarita (FCSC) is an American soccer team based in Santa Clarita, California, United States. FC Santa Clarita also known as the Santa Clarita Storm make just north of Los Angeles home, as they compete in the United Premier Soccer League (UPSL). Santa Clarita FC announced they joined the UPSL's Western Conference November 5, 2014. The team is owned by American businessman Gary Brunner, President and CEO of United Sports International Inc. The team is Santa Clarita's only sports franchise calling the area home with the encouragement and support of the city.

Founded in 2006 as the Lancaster Rattlers, the team played in the USL Premier Development League (PDL), before re-branding in 2011 as the Santa Clarita Storm joining the NPSL then in 2014 moving up to join the UPSL. In 2018, Santa Clarita Storm merged with San Fernando Valley Scorpions to form FC Santa Clarita. The team's colors are red, black and white.

== History ==
=== PDL ===
The Lancaster Rattlers entered the USL Premier Development League in 2007 as the first ever soccer franchise from the Antelope Valley area of Southern California. They played their first competitive game on April 28, 2007, a 2–1 loss to fellow expansion franchise, Ventura County Fusion, and this unfortunately set the standard for a disappointing first season. Four straight losses – including a 5–1 hammering by Bakersfield Brigade – left the Rattlers languishing at the bottom of the table. Head coach Steve McKenzie was replaced halfway through the season by Gary Brunner, the boss's son, but the change resulted in limited success; their first victory (2–1 over the San Francisco Seals) was the single bright spot of a summer which saw them lose eight of their next nine games, scoring 15 goals but conceding an astonishing 32. A difficult first season ended with the Rattlers managing a 2–2 draw against Los Angeles Storm, but finishing dead last in the division, six points adrift of their closest rivals, and second-worst in the entire PDL (only Cocoa Expos had a worse record). Martin Galvan was top scorer.

2008 wasn't much better for the team from Antelope Valley; they started the season with third new head coach, Costas Skouras, but the on-field products remained poor. After a 2–2 tie with Bakersfield Brigade in their opening fixture, the Rattlers went on to lose seven straight games, including a 5–0 hammering by Los Angeles Legends, a 4–2 loss to San Fernando Valley Quakes, and a 4–1 home defeat to Fresno Fuego. The Rattlers finally picked up their first win in a see-saw game against Orange County Blue Star which saw them emerge on the right side of a 4–2 scoreline, and they followed this up with a 2–1 win on the road against Bakersfield Brigade – the first time in franchise history that the Rattlers had enjoyed back-to-back victories. However, this proved to be the year's single bright spot. Coach Skouras was replaced mid-season by Javier Gallegos – the second time the Rattlers made a coaching change during their campaign – but they failed to win another game, ending their year with three ties and three losses, including 4–0 thrashing by Ventura County Fusion. The Rattlers finished the year dead last in the division for the second time, four points adrift of their closest rivals, Southern California Seahorses. Mauricio Harrie was top scorer, with three goals.

Lancaster had their best season to date in 2009. Under new head coach David Lopez – their fifth in three years – the Rattlers showed slow and steady improvement as the season progressed. The year began well with a 3–2 win over the Los Angeles Legends thanks to a pair of goals from Mauricio Harrie, but quickly turned sour as the Antelope Valley side failed to win any of their next eight games. They let a four-goal lead slip in their agonizing 5–5 tie with Fresno Fuego at the end of May, and suffered several heavy defeats, including a 3–0 loss away to the Hollywood United Hitmen and 6–1 thrashing at the hands of Los Angeles Legends, who clearly wanted revenge for their defeat earlier in the season. However, sometime in the middle of June, something happened to the Lancaster team, and they began 'rattling' off win after win. They beat Ogden Outlaws 4–3 in a seesaw game in which Richard Galvan scored an 84th-minute winner, comfortably knocked off Bakersfield Brigade 3–0 at home, fought back to tie 2–2 with Ventura County Fusion having gone behind twice, and pummelled Ogden for a second time, winning 5–2 on the road in the penultimate game of the season with two more goals from Mauricio Harrie. The rocky early part of the season meant that the best the Rattlers could do was 7th place in the division – but this was a significant improvement over previous years. Harrie was the team's top scorer with an impressive nine goals, and the fact that Moises Alvarez, Jose Garay, Christian Hernandez and Miguel Ibarra all score five or more goals each highlights their improved fortunes in front of goal.

The Rattlers changed their coach yet again during the 2009–2010 offseason, with Jarrod Cline taking over duties from David Lopez as player-coach.

The team left the USL PDL after the 2010 season to join the National Premier Soccer League.

=== NPSL ===
In August 2011, the team moved to Santa Clarita, California and became the FC Santa Clarita Storm.

In the 2012 season, the team finished in 2nd Place in the Southwest Conference with an 8–3–3 record. The highlight was defeating the San Diego Flash 4–3 on July 7, denying the Flash an undefeated season. They lost to the Bay Area Ambassadors in the West Division Semi-Final 3–2. In the 2013 season the team was one point behind the flash and played each other in the last game of the season. Flash only needing a tie to clinch a playoff berth and the Storm needing a win to jump the San Diego rivalry. in the 82nd minute in a 1–1 tie the Storm was awarded a Penalty Kick and scored but called back on an infringement call. But instead of a retake as it calls for in FIFA rules, the official called it a goal kick. To much objections and protest the decision was given to the home team the Flash. The Storm was kept from advancing because of the misapplication of a FIFA rule. In 2014, the club finished in fourth place in a rebuilding year that was not the best since its move to Santa Clarita.

=== UPSL ===
In 2014 the United Premier Soccer League announced that the Santa Clarita Storm joined the UPSL and officially were new team member of the Western Conference for the 2014/15 UPSL Season. The UPSL currently consists of two conferences covering Los Angeles County which includes Los Angeles, Orange County and the Inland Empire.

The UPSL ran a 2014 fall and winter schedule with playoffs that concluded in March, 2015. The Storm joined the L.A. Wolves FC, Santa Monica Sporting FC, Penmar LA FC, L.A. South Bay, So Cal Troop, Las Vegas High Rollers, and Del Rey City SC to make up the Western Conference. The Southeast Conference was made up of OC Crew, PSA Elite, Banning USA, OC Stars, Santa Ana Winds FC, Cal Dream, UC Irvine, UC Riverside, Garden Grove City FC, La Máquina FC, and Glory United.

=== Notable former players ===
This list of notable former players comprises players who went on to play professional soccer after playing for the team in the Premier Development League, or those who previously played professionally before joining the team.

- Moises Alvarez joins Rattlers on loan from Querétaro FC, Mexico. Signed with Mérida FC of Mexico in 2007, the team is currently playing in the Liga de Ascenso. Signed with Querétaro FC in 2008, Querétaro plays in the Liga MX. Attended camp for Mexico youth soccer Academy in 2006. Moises was called up to Mexico National under-18 football team in 2007, and Mexico National under-20 football team in 2009. After the Rattlers season, Moises return to Querétaro FC in 2010. Moises was loan to Alacranes de Durango for the 2010–2011 season. At the time Alacranes de Durango we're competing in the Liga de Ascenso in Mexico.
- (United States) Carlos Aguilar
- Miguel Ibarra signed with Minnesota United of the NASL in 2011. Currently playing for Mexican club León and the United States national team.
- (United States) Aaron Perez signed with LA Blues in 2012 resigned with O.C Blues (formerly LA Blues) of USL Pro
- Alex Harlley signed by Eric Wynalda of the Atlantic Silverbacks in 2014 Alex came from Togo Africa in 2011 and played with the Storm up to his signing with the NASL team.

== Year-by-year ==
Year	Division	League	Regular season	Playoffs	Open Cup
2007	4	USL PDL	10th, Southwest	did not qualify	did not qualify
2008	4	USL PDL	10th, Southwest	did not qualify	did not qualify
2009	4	USL PDL	7th, Southwest	did not qualify	did not qualify
2010	4	USL PDL	7th, Southwest	did not qualify	did not qualify
2011	4	NPSL	5th, Southwest	did not qualify	did not qualify
2012	4	NPSL	2nd, Southwest	West Division Semifinals	did not qualify
2013	4	NPSL	3rd, West-Southern	did not qualify	did not qualify

== Head coaches ==
- (United States) Steve Mackenzie (2007)
- (United States) Gary Brunner (2007)
- (United States) Costa Skouras (2008)
- (United States) Javier Gallegos (2008)
- (El Salvador) David Lopez (2009)
- (United States) Jarrod Cline (2010–2011)
- (United States) Jose Meza (2012–present)

== Stadia ==
- Stadium at Palmdale High School; Palmdale, California (2007)
- Stadium at Pete Knight High School; Palmdale, California (2008)
- Brent Newcomb Stadium at Antelope Valley High School; Lancaster, California (2009–2011)
- Stadium at Hart High School; Santa Clarita, California (2012)
- Stadium at Valencia High School; Santa Clarita, California (2012)
- Stadium at Canyon High School; Santa Clarita, California (2012)

== Average attendance ==
Attendance stats are calculated by averaging each team's self-reported home attendances from the historical match archive at https://web.archive.org/web/20100105175057/http://www.uslsoccer.com/history/index_E.html.

- 2007: 238
- 2008: 155
- 2009: 225
- 2010: 129
- 2011: 125
- 2012: 175
- 2013: 225
- 2014: 175
