= San Nicolas FC =

San Nicolás FC
- Full name: San Nicolás FC
- League: United Premier Soccer League

San Nicolás FC is an American soccer club from Pomona, California, competing in the United Premier Soccer League.

== 2017 UPSL Resurgence ==
San Nicolás FC returned to the UPSL in June 2017, taking the place of Moreno Valley FC, that dropped out of league competition after being eliminated from the Cal South State Cup, by L.A. Wolves FC, and from the second round of the 2017 U.S. Open Cup by OKC Energy FC.

== 2016 UPSL & Open Cup ==
Although San Nicolás FC competed in the UPSL, both they and fellow UPSL squad and 2016 Open Cup entrant La Máquina FC were suspended from UPSL play due to them being involved in a brawl. San Nicolas FC competed in another league called the "Los Angeles Premier Soccer League," in 2016 and seasons prior, not to be confused with the Los Angeles Premier League, which is based in the Santa Monica / Los Angeles Westside. The LAPSL listed only five teams in 2015, making San Nicolas ineligible to compete in future Open Cups, due to US Soccer's requirement of having Open Division teams qualify by virtue of playing in leagues with at least 10 teams.

The club entered the 2016 U.S. Open Cup, against FC Tucson of the Premier Development League on May 11, 2016, a game they lost 3–0, thus being eliminated in the first round.

San Nicolás qualified to the 2016 U.S. Open Cup, first by satisfying U.S. Soccer's requirement of competing in a league with at least 10 teams (UPSL), then by defeating Corinthians USA on October 24 and 3–0 win vs. Real Sociedad, both of the SoCal Premier League on November 22, 2015.
