= Orange County FC =

- Orange County Football Club logo
- Full name: Orange County Football Club
- Nickname: OCFC
- Founded: 2009; 17 years ago
- Ground: Portola High School; Irvine, California
- Owner(s): Nader Dejbakhsh; NW Promotions
- Manager: Paul Caligiuri
- League: United Premier Soccer League
- 2018: 3rd - NPSL Southwest

Orange County FC is an American soccer club based in Lake Forest, California, that currently plays in the United Premier Soccer League. They previously played in the National Premier Soccer League and SoCal Premier League. The club's colors are light blue and white. NPSL home matches are currently played at Portola High School.

== History ==
Orange County FC was founded in 2009, and competed in the SoCal Premier League between 2009 and 2016.

=== NPSL ===
On November 15, 2016, the club announced that it would join the NPSL as an expansion team for the 2017 season.

==== 2017 season ====
OCFC finished second in the NPSL Southwest in its inaugural season in the NPSL Southwest, with a record of ten wins, five draws, and only one defeat. The club qualified to the playoffs where it defeated Riverside Coras 1–0 in the Regional First round and eliminated conference leader FC Arizona in the regional semifinal by a score of 2–0. The victory meant that Orange County FC would qualify to the 2018 Lamar Hunt U.S. Open Cup.

OCFC eventually fell to CD Aguiluchos USA by a score of 1–0 in the Regional Final, one game away from reaching the national semifinals.

==== 2018 season ====
Orange County FC qualified to the West Region Playoff for the second year in a row after finishing third in the NPSL Southwest behind conference winners ASC San Diego and conference runners-up FC Golden State. OCFC finished the season with seven wins, four draws, and one loss.

OCFC defeated FC Arizona 3–0 in a Southwest Conference play-in match to advance to the regional quarterfinals.

After a 3–1 win over ASC San Diego in the Quarterfinals, OCFC defeated FC Golden State 4–2 to advance to the Regional Finals for the second season in a row and qualified to the 2019 U.S. Open Cup. However, OCFC missed out on the national semifinals once again after a shocking 6–4 defeat to FC Mulhouse Portland on July 21, 2018.

==== 2020 season ====
The team was not listed as a member of the NPSL ahead of the 2020 season.

=== UPSL ===
==== 2020 season ====
Orange County Football Club participated in the UPSL Western Conference - Socal North League. They played one match against USA Soccer Stars FC and won by a score of 6-3. The UPSL suspended their season on March 13.

== U.S. Open Cup ==
=== 2018 ===
Orange County FC qualified to the 2018 U.S. Open Cup by finishing as one of the top eight teams in the 2017 NPSL Playoffs. On April 4, 2018, the US Soccer Federation announced the pairings for the first round of the U.S. Open Cup in which OCFC drew Santa Ana Winds FC of the United Premier Soccer League.

OCFC defeated Santa Ana Winds FC 3–0 in its U.S. Open Cup debut on May 9, 2018, and advanced to the second round to face Fresno FC of the USL Championship.

Orange County FC was eliminated in the second round after a 2–0 defeat in extra time to Fresno FC.

=== 2019 ===
For the second consecutive year, Orange County FC qualified to the second round of the U.S. Open Cup after a hard-fought 2–0 win over FC Golden State Force of USL League Two on May 7, 2019.

Orange County FC was drawn with Orange County SC of the USL Championship for the second round in a match that would become labeled by soccer journalists as "The Battle of Orange County". It would be OCFC's first time playing against a professional soccer club in a competitive match.

Orange County SC led 2–1 in stoppage time but center back Ryan Holland scored the equalizer to tie the game at 2-2. The match went to penalties and Orange County FC won 5–3 to advance to the third round to face Las Vegas Lights FC.

They lost the fourth round of the cup to the LA Galaxy, 3-0.

== Front office ==
- (United States) (Iran) Nader Dejbakhsh – Co-Founder
- (United States) (Iran) Carmel Dejbakhsh – Co-Founder
- (United States) (Iran) Dara Dejbakhsh – Co-Founder

== See also ==
- Orange County Blue Star
