= Santa Ana Winds FC =

Santa Ana
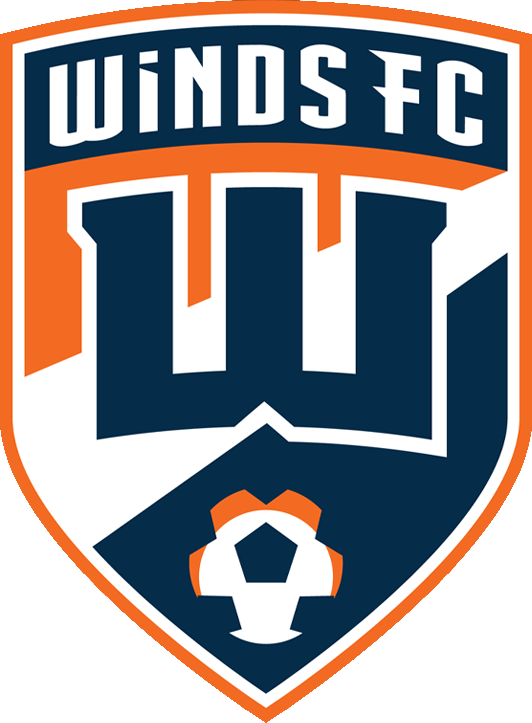
- Full name: Santa Ana Winds FC
- Nicknames: Winds FC; Los Vendavales; Golden City FC; LA Winds
- Founded: 2006
- Ground: Lake Forest Sports Park; Championship Stadium; Santa Ana College
- Owner: Leonel López
- Head Coach: Marco Paniagua
- League: United Premier Soccer League
Home colors	Away colors

Santa Ana Winds FC, also known as Winds FC, is a soccer team founded in Santa Ana, California, and a founding United Premier Soccer League club currently playing at the Lake Forest Sports Park, with occasional matches played at Championship Stadium at the Orange County Great Park. The club takes its name from a Southern California weather condition known as the Santa Ana winds. Santa Ana Winds FC, an elite amateur and professional development club, has played international development squads in the past, namely matches against a Club Atlas U-20 squad in March 2011, and a Chivas de Guadalajara U-20 squad in November 2011. On November 18, 2017, the club made history by qualifying to the 2018 U.S. Open Cup for the first time. On Tuesday, June 5, 2018, Winds FC winger Juan Arellano became the first player to transfer directly from Santa Ana Winds FC to an international professional club.

Santa Ana Winds FC was founded in 2006 by Leonel López and brothers.

== History ==
=== SoCal Premier ===
Santa Ana Winds FC played in the SoCal Premier League from 2006 to 2011 before joining the National Premier Soccer League West Region-Flight Southwest Conference, also in 2011. The club played in the 2006–07 Raúl Briones Cup, Group B, that they shared with Morelos, PSA and OC United. Winds FC finished third behind Morelos and PSA.

==== 2006–07 Raúl Briones Cup, Group B ====
Place	Team	Pld.	W	T	L	GF	GA	GD	Points
1	Morelos	3	3	0	0	10	3	+7	9
2	PSA	3	2	0	1	7	1	+6	6
3	Santa Ana Winds FC	3	1	0	2	7	8	−1	3
4	OC United	3	0	0	3	5	17	−12	0

=== NPSL ===
Winds FC finished second in the NPSL Southwest Conference during their sole NPSL season, made the playoffs and fell in the first round to Hollywood United Hitmen, a national finalist that year, by a score of 3–1.

The club left the NPSL after one season due to a split between owners. One faction of ownership left and kept the Santa Ana Winds FC name, while forming a startup development league called the United Premier Soccer League, which was also founded in Santa Ana. The other faction of ownership continued to operate in the NPSL with the borrowed name Fullerton Rangers, and later called themselves Orange County Spartans, and then OC Pateadores, before disappearing from the NPSL. Winds FC shared the NPSL West – Flight Southwest conference with FC Hasental, Lancaster Rattlers (now FC Santa Clarita), San Diego Boca F.C. and the San Diego Flash.

==== 2011 NPSL West Division – Flight Southwest, Final Standings ====
Place	Team	Pld.	W	T	L	GF	GA	GD	Points
1	San Diego Flash	14	10	1	3	37	16	+21	31
2	Santa Ana Winds FC	14	8	2	4	25	19	+6	26
3	FC Hasental	14	6	3	5	27	27	0	21
4	San Diego Boca	14	6	1	7	29	32	−3	19
5	Lancaster Rattlers	14	3	0	11	26	52	−26	9

=== UPSL ===
Santa Ana Winds FC was a founding club of the United Premier Soccer League, established in 2011. The club has been playing UPSL, Open Cup and State Cup matches since in Lake Forest, California or Irvine, California consistently in the last few years, while attempting to find a home field in the City of Santa Ana. Winds FC has one UPSL Championship title, from the 2012–13 season, a league cup title (later named Admiral Cup) from 2014, two Western Conference, SoCal Division Championship titles and one Western Conference Championship title from the Spring-Summer 2018 season. The club played all of their Spring 2016 league matches at the Lake Forest Sports Complex in Lake Forest, approximately 17 miles away from the City of Santa Ana, and began scheduling UPSL summer/fall season matches at Santa Ana College in July 2016. Other fields where the club has played UPSL matches include the Orange County Great Park and Las Lomas Park, both in Irvine.

The club began playing UPSL matches at the SAUSD Sports Complex Stadium, also known as Valley Falcons Stadium, in April 2017. On December 7, 2017 Santa Ana Winds FC played their first UPSL league match at the newly built Championship Stadium at the Orange County Great Park against the LA Wolves, a game Winds FC won 3–1. Winds FC returned to Championship Stadium on January 7, 2018 in a playoff match against Orange County FC, a game Winds FC won 6–5 in penalty kicks. On January 13, Winds FC defeated the East Bay Stompers Juniors in the UPSL National Semi-final at Championship Stadium.

=== Juan Arellano Transfer to Cartaginés ===
On Tuesday, June 5, 2018, Club Sport Cartaginés of Costa Rica, coached by Paulo Wanchope announced new player signings ahead of their 2018 season among which Winds FC winger Juan Arellano was included. Juan Arellano became the first player to transfer directly from Santa Ana Winds FC to a professional club. Juan Arellano spent a week-long trial with the club prior to being invited to preseason and subsequently presented with C.S. Cartaginés.

=== Santa Ana Winds FC México ===
In 2017, a Mexican development club using the Santa Ana Winds FC name sprouted in Mexico City, in the Avante section of the Coyoacán borough. The team trained and played at the Jesús Clark Flores sporting park, between Santa Ana and Avenida Calzada de la Virgen streets. Winds FC founders Leonel López and Pedro Magallón granted use of the club name to Mexico-based trainer Roberto Vásquez.

=== Costa Rica and Central America ===
Winds FC named Costa Rican soccer personality José Luis Bustos Director of International Soccer Operations for Costa Rica and Central America in October 2018. Part of Bustos's tasks include forming a partnership with a professional Costa Rican club and organizing a tournament in Costa Rica where Winds FC along with Asociación Deportiva Carmelita are set to participate in.

== Club Crest ==
The first Santa Ana Winds FC crest dates from 2006 to 2013 and features the Spurgeon Building's clock tower, located in the Downtown Santa Ana Historic District and named after city founder William H. Spurgeon.

The second Santa Ana Winds FC crest (2014–17) was redesigned in 2014 by sports logo artist Slavo Kiss for Sigma Kappa Brands, based in the Slovak Republic. The crest featured the City of Santa Ana Water Tower, visible from the Santa Ana Freeway, also known as the Interstate 5 Freeway or Golden State Freeway, which connects the cities of Los Angeles and San Diego, and connects at the Mexico–United States border to the city of Tijuana.

The third and most-current Santa Ana Winds FC crest was redesigned in late 2017 again by Slavo Kiss looking to 2018 and the club's debut in the U.S. Open Cup.

Santa Ana Winds logo history
2014–17

== Rivalries ==
- The Golden City Classic (an all-Santa Ana rivalry versus La Máquina)
- The Sunset Derby (versus LA Wolves FC)
- The I-5 Derby (versus Orange County FC)

== Supporter Groups ==
The Aeolian Guard
The Angeltown Post
The I-Fivers

== 2018 Open Cup Squad ==
The following players were called to the September 23 Open Cup qualifying match versus Outbreak Soccer.

Player Number, Name, Position:

1. Adrian Urquizo, GK

2. Ezequiel Estrada

3. Juan Fuentes, RB

4. Oscar Sandoval

5. Israel Espinoza

8. Kyle O'Brien, MF

9. Carlos Andrade

13. Khalil Zaid

14. Quinn M. Harter, CB

16. Derek Solano

17. Juan Arellano, LW

19. Ruben Ortiz

20. Osvaldo Hernandez

21. Kramer Runager, F

23. George Zuniga

- Jordan Gorman
- Omar Perez

== Front Office ==
- (Mexico) (United States) Leonel López: Founder, President
- (Costa Rica) (United States) Marco Paniagua: General Manager

== Head coaches ==
- (Costa Rica) (United States) Marco Paniagua (2018–present)
- (United States) Jose Lopez (2016–2018)
- (United States) Arturo Martínez (2016)
- (United States) Cesar Reyes (2015–2016)
- (United States) Mele López (2013–2014)

== Team records ==
=== 2018 Spring UPSL Playoffs ===
Western Conference, SoCal Division Champion

July 15, 2018 Round 1	Santa Ana Winds FC	4–1	LA Galaxy OC	Lake Forest, California
7:00 p.m	4		1	Stadium: Lake Forest Sports Park

July 22, 2018 Round 2	LA Wolves FC	1–1 (4–5 pk)	Santa Ana Winds FC	Lake Forest, California
7:00 p.m	4		5	Stadium: Lake Forest Sports Park

July 28, 2018 Round 3	Santa Ana Winds FC	3–3 (4–3 pk)	Sporting San Fernando	Lake Forest, California
7:00 p.m	3		3	Stadium: Lake Forest Sports Park; Attendance: 193

August 4, 2018 Round 4	Nevada Coyotes FC	0–3	Santa Ana Winds FC	Salinas, California
4:00 p.m	0		3	Stadium: Rabobank Stadium

==== Final Rounds ====
August 10, 2018 Quarterfinal	FC Boulder	1–1 (3–4 pk)	Santa Ana Winds FC	Arvada, Colorado
7:30 p.m. MDT	1		1	Stadium: NAAC Stadium

August 11, 2018 Semifinal	Sporting Arizona FC	2–1	Santa Ana Winds FC	Arvada, Colorado
8:00 pm MDT	2		1	Stadium: NAAC Stadium

=== 2017–18 Fall/Winter UPSL Playoffs ===
National Finalist, Runner-Up

January 6, 2018 Round 1	Santa Ana Winds FC	4–1	LA Wolves FC	Lake Forest, California
7:00 p.m	4		1	Stadium: Lake Forest Sports Park

January 7, 2018 Round 2	Orange County FC 2	1–1 (5–6 aet)	Santa Ana Winds FC	Irvine, California
7:00 p.m	1		1	Stadium: Championship Stadium

January 13, 2018 Quarterfinal Round	Boise Cutthroats FC	1–3	Santa Ana Winds FC	Lake Forest, California
10:30 a.m.	1		3	Stadium: Lake Forest Sports Park

January 13, 2018 Semifinal Round	Santa Ana Winds FC	2–0	East Bay FC Stompers Jrs	Irvine, California
8:00 p.m	2		0	Stadium: Championship Stadium

January 14, 2018 Final Round	OC Invicta	3–2	Santa Ana Winds FC	Norco, California
4:00 p.m	3		2	Stadium: SilverLakes Sports Complex

=== 2016–17 Fall/Winter UPSL Playoffs ===
Winds FC defeated regional powerhouse and conference rival La Máquina FC on Tuesday, January 24, 2017 at Santa Ana Stadium by a score of 2–1.

January 24, 2017 Match 1	Santa Ana Winds FC	2–1	La Máquina	Santa Ana, California
8:00 p.m				Stadium: Santa Ana Stadium

== U.S. Open Cup record ==
=== 2018 Open Cup ===
May 9, 2017 Round 1	Orange County FC	3–0	Santa Ana Winds FC	Irvine, California
7:00 p.m	3		0	Stadium: Championship Stadium

=== 2018 Open Cup Qualifying ===
September 23, 2017 Qualifying Round 1	Santa Ana Winds FC	5–2	Outbreak Soccer	Lake Forest, California
7:00 p.m	5	Report	2	Stadium: Lake Forest Sports Park

October 21, 2017 Qualifying Round 2	Santa Ana Winds FC	6–0	Newcastle United FC	Lake Forest, California
7:00 p.m	6	Report	0	Stadium: Lake Forest Sports Park

November 18, 2017 Qualifying Round 3	Santa Ana Winds FC	4–1	San Pedro Monsters FC	Lake Forest, California
7:00 p.m	4	Report	1	Stadium: Lake Forest Sports Park

=== 2017 Open Cup Qualifying ===
Santa Ana Winds FC were scheduled to host fellow UPSL club La Habra City FC at Lake Forest Sports Park on Sunday, September 18 in a qualifying match to the first round of the 2017 U.S. Open Cup, but had the match moved to Colton High School in Colton, California. Santa Ana defeated La Habra City FC by a score of 5–0 in the first-ever U.S. Open Cup qualifying match for either team.

The October 23 Open Cup qualifier vs La Máquina was cancelled due to a thunderstorm in Irvine, and was rescheduled for October 30 at 6 pm at Orange County Great Park.

September 18, 2016 Qualifying Round 1	Santa Ana Winds FC (UPSL)	5–0	La Habra City FC (UPSL)	Colton, CA
6:30 pm	5	Report	0	Stadium: Colton High School Stadium

October 30, 2016 Qualifying Round 2	La Maquina FC (UPSL)	3–0	Santa Ana Winds FC (UPSL)	Irvine, California
6:00 pm	3	Report	0	Stadium: Orange County Great Park

== Honors ==
=== Titles ===
- UPSL National Championship: Runner-Up, 2019–20
- UPSL Western Conference Champion, Fall-Winter 2019-20
- UPSL Western Conference, SoCal Division Champion, Fall-Winter 2019-20
- UPSL Western Conference Champion, Spring 2018
- UPSL Western Conference, SoCal Division Champion, Spring 2018
- UPSL Western Conference, SoCal Division Champion, Fall-Winter, 2017–18
- UPSL National Championship: Runner-Up, Fall-Winter 2017–18
- UPSL, Admiral Cup Champions: 2014
- United Premier Soccer League Champions: Fall-Winter 2012–13

=== Individual Honors ===
- National United Premier Soccer League Most Valuable Player: Kyle O'Brien, Fall 2017
- National Player of the Week: Jordan Gorman, 2017, Western Pro Premier Division, Week 17
- National Player of the Week: Adan Coronado, 2017, Western Pro Premier Division, Week 3

=== Tournament Finishing ===
- U.S. Open Cup: Qualified, First Round, 2018
- UPSL Fall-Winter National Championship: Runner-Up, 2017–18
- Cal South State Cup, Quarterfinals, 2018
- Cal South State Cup, Quarterfinals, 2017
- US Open Cup, Second Qualifying Round, 2016

== Home fields (All time: SoCal Premier, NPSL, UPSL) ==
- Heritage Park Field; Irvine, California (2006–2008)
- Rancho Capistrano; San Juan Capistrano, California (2006–2008)
- Centennial Park Field; Santa Ana, California (2009–2010)
- Oak Creek Park Field; Irvine, California (2009–2010)
- Westgrove Park; Garden Grove, California (2009–2010)
- Santa Ana Stadium; Santa Ana, California (2011–2013)
- Santa Ana College; Santa Ana, California (2013)
- Orange County Great Park; Irvine, California (2013–2016)
- Las Lomas Community Park; Irvine, California (2014)
- Lake Forest Sports Park; Lake Forest, California (2016–2017)
- Championship Stadium at OC Great Park; Irvine, California (Dec. 2017)

== Sponsors and partners ==
- Score Sports, 2018–21
- Admiral Sportswear, 2014–18
- Molten, 2014–18

== Season-by-season ==
Year	Division	League	Combined Season	Playoffs	Open Cup
2006	USASA	SoCal Premier	7th, Premier Division		
2007	USASA	SoCal Premier	7th, Premier Division		
2008	USASA	SoCal Premier	8th, Premier Division		
2009	USASA	SoCal Premier	7th, Premier Division		
2010	USASA	SoCal Premier	7th, Premier Division		
2011	USASA	SoCal Premier	7th, Premier Division		
2011	USASA	NPSL	2nd, West – Southwest Conference	First Round	
2012	USASA	UPSL			
2013	USASA	UPSL	1st, Southeast	Champions	
2014	USASA	UPSL		Admiral Cup Champions	
2015	On Hiatus				
2016–2017	USASA	UPSL Fall/Winter	7th, Southeast	did not qualify	Second Round
2017	USASA	UPSL Spring/Summer	8th, Western Pro Premier Conference	did not qualify	
2017–2018	USASA	UPSL Fall/Winter	3rd, Western Pro Premier Conference	SoCal Division Champions	First Round
2018	USASA	UPSL Spring/Summer	3rd, Western Conference, SoCal Division	Western Conference Champion; SoCal Division Champion	
