= San Diego Zest FC =

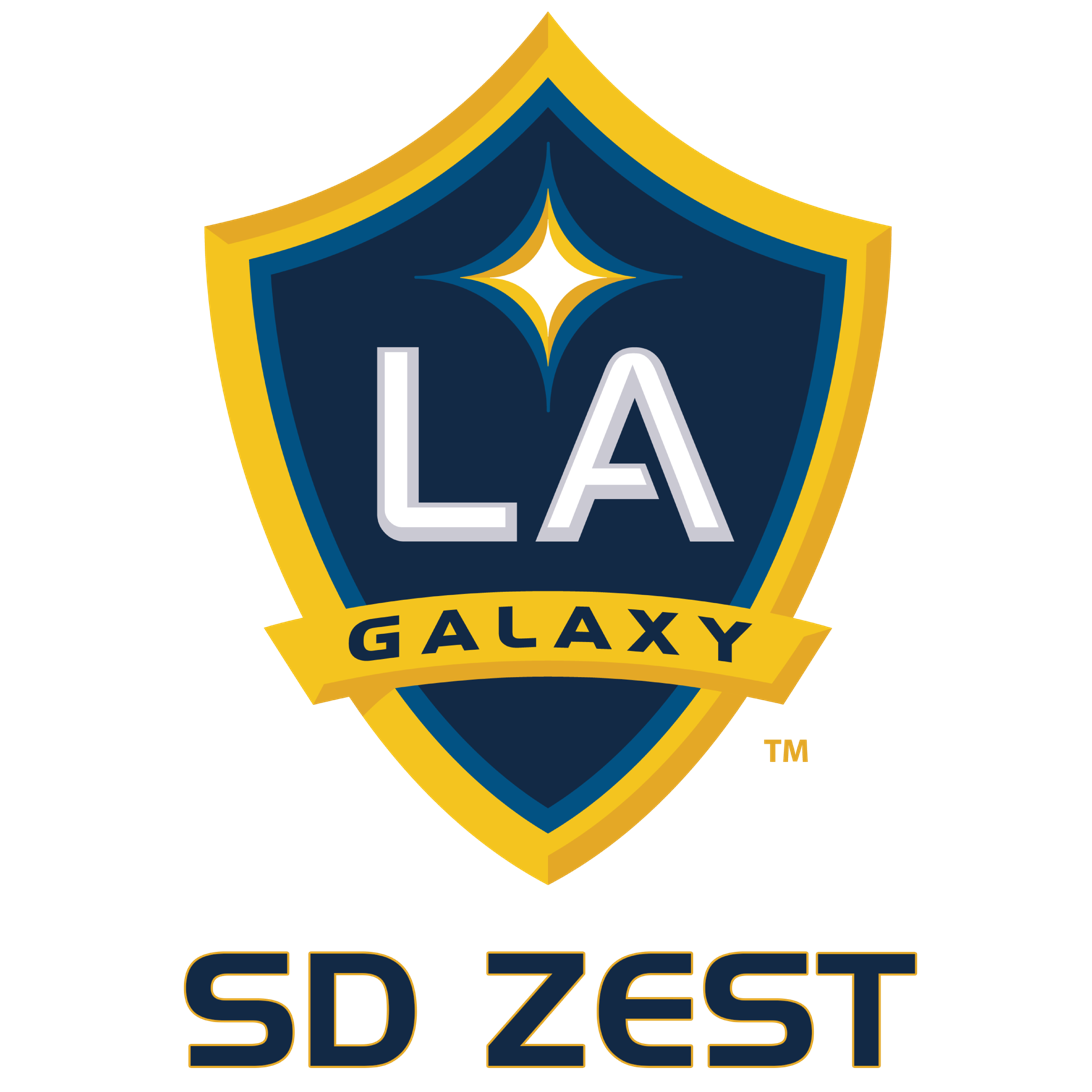
- Full name: San Diego Zest FC
- Short name: Zest FC
- Founded: 2016; 10 years ago
- Stadium: Multiple
- Owners: San Diego Sports Authority
- Head Coach: (South Korea) Jaewoo Kim
- League: USL League Two
- 2019: 7th, Southwest Division; Playoffs: DNQ
- Website: http://www.sandiegozestfc.us/
| Home colors | Away colors |

San Diego Zest FC is an American soccer team based in San Diego, California. The club was founded in 2016 and is owned and operated by the San Diego Sports Authority, a Japanese–owned sports management company. They compete as LA Galaxy SD Zest in USL League Two and play their home matches at James Madison High School's George Hoagland Stadium. The team colors are orange and navy.

== History ==
San Diego Zest FC was established in 2016 by a sports management company called the San Diego Sports Authority, hereafter SDSA, located in San Diego, California. The project was started in 2014 with aim of developing the local community soccer level and providing Japanese soccer players the path to pro in the U.S. On January 21, 2016, the USL PDL announced that it had awarded the franchise to San Diego Zest FC, starting with the 2016 season. "San Diego has for a long time been a target city for the USL PDL, we are very excited the outstanding leadership of the San Diego Sports Authority will be the group that brings the league to a great soccer city, and are looking forward to working with the club for many years to come.” said league director Todd Eason.

=== 2016: Inaugural Season ===
- San Diego Zest FC had a very successful inaugural season campaign. They finished with an 8-1-5 record, which resulted in a 2nd-place finish in the Southwestern Division and clinching a berth into the USL PDL playoffs. They lost in a very close match to FC Golden State Force 2–3 in overtime.

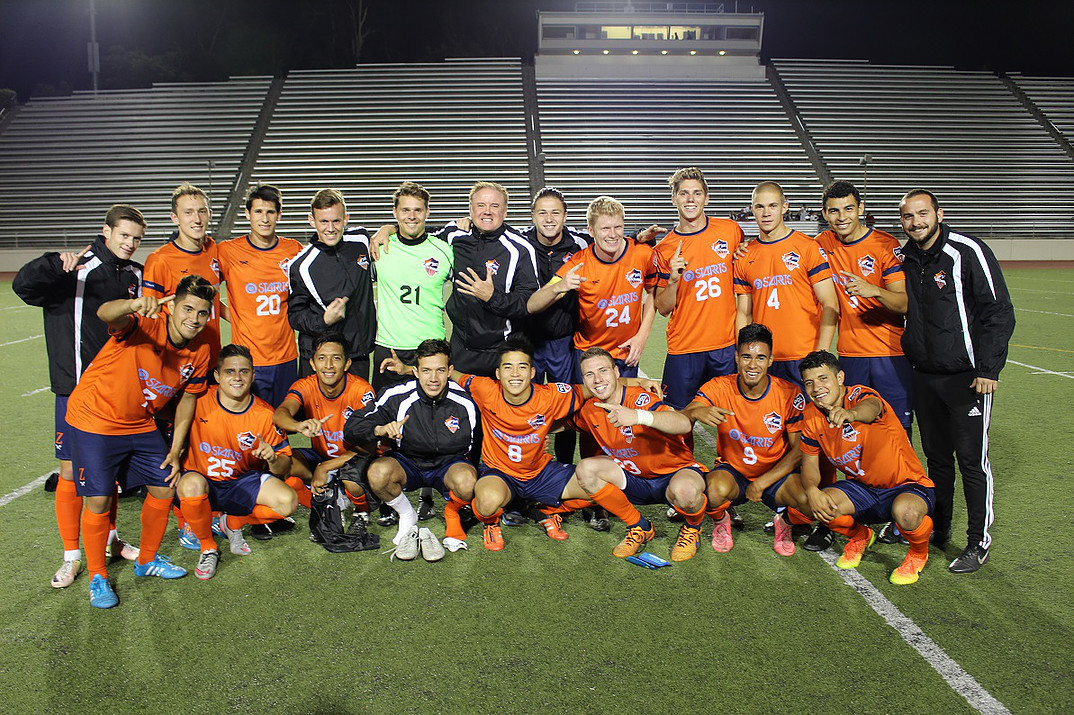
Zest FC players celebrate after defeating FC Golden State Force 5–1 during its 2016 season regular season match.

- Zest FC was led by its two stars, UCLA's DF/MF Erik Holt, and Chico State's FW Matthew Hurlow-Paonessa. Holt was named to PDL's All-Western Conference team, scoring 2 goals and playing very well in the playoffs. Hurlow-Paonessa was a scoring phenomenon for Zest FC, scoring 9 goals and contributing an assist during his campaign.
- Hurlow-Paonessa became the first player to sign with a professional soccer club in San Diego Zest FC's history, agreeing to his first professional contract with Phoenix Rising FC.

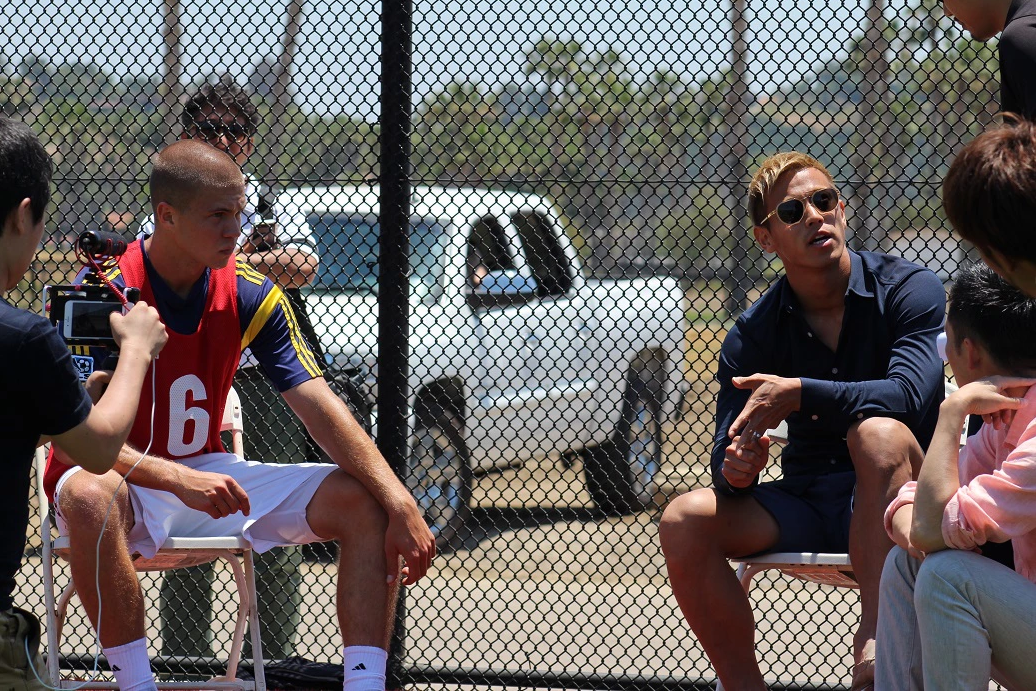
Erik Holt had an interview with SV Horn's owner Keisuke Honda after he proved his high performance to them at Horn's professional tryout.

=== 2017: Second Season ===
- On February 22, 2017, San Diego Zest FC officially clinched a berth for the 2017 Lamar Hunt U.S. Open Cup as a result from their very successful inaugural season. They lost to LA Wolves FC in the opening round 2-4 in their U.S. Open Cup debut. Zest FC was not able to carry its high performance from its inaugural season, finishing with a 3-9-2 record in its 2nd season.

==== Introduced Women's Team To Compete in 2018 ====
- On May 22, 2017, San Diego Zest FC announced the founding of an all woman's team to compete in the Women's Premier Soccer League, WPSL, starting in the 2018 season. The sister club of the San Diego Zest will hope to emulate the same success their founding team who are competing in their second season as members of the USL PDL.

==== New Ownership of Montenegrin Third Division Club FK Adria ====
- On October 4, San Diego Zest FC announced its new ownership of Montenegro soccer club, FK Adria, launched and started competing in the Montenegrin Third League in the 2017–2018 season. FK Adria, named after the Adriatic Sea, has a mission to groom people to be successful individuals, even after their playing careers have ended, at the international level by implementing a vision that includes what the team calls "character-building through soccer.

==== Partnership with Los Angeles Galaxy San Diego ====
- San Diego Zest FC announced a new partnership with Los Angeles Galaxy San Diego on November 17th. Zest FC and LA Galaxy San Diego are committed to benefiting each other through cooperation and developing good sportsmanship within the athletes while promoting enthusiasm within the community locally, nationally, and internationally through soccer.

==== U.S. Pro Soccer Combine in Japan ====
- San Diego Zest FC hosted a 2-Day U.S. Pro Soccer Combine on December 16th and 17th in Fukuoka, Japan. Four clubs from USL Championship including Charleston Battery, Richmond Kickers, North Carolina FC and Nashville SC. attended for scouting Asian talents. Several players from the combine were invited to each club's second tryout.
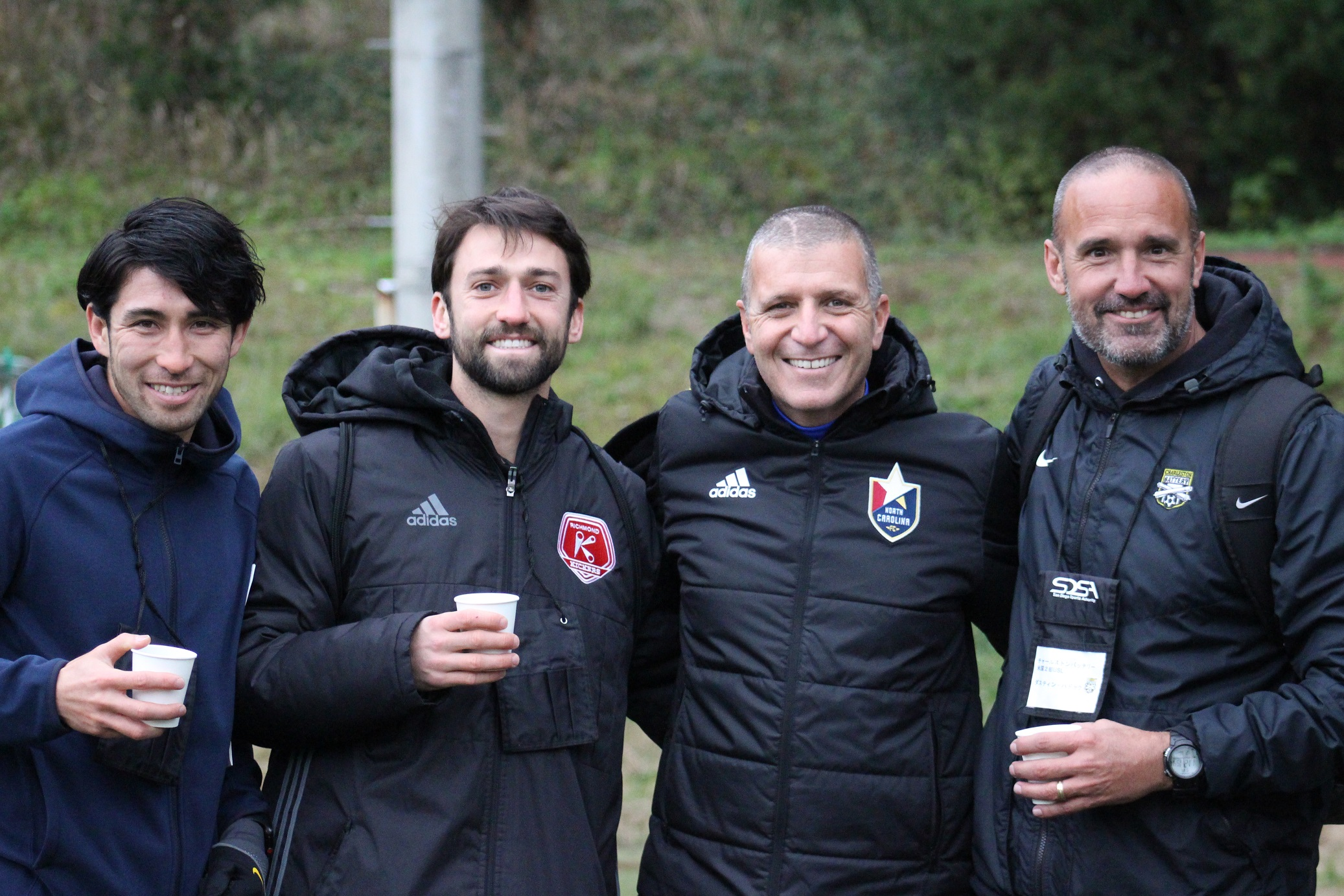
  Four of USL coaches came over to Fukuoka.
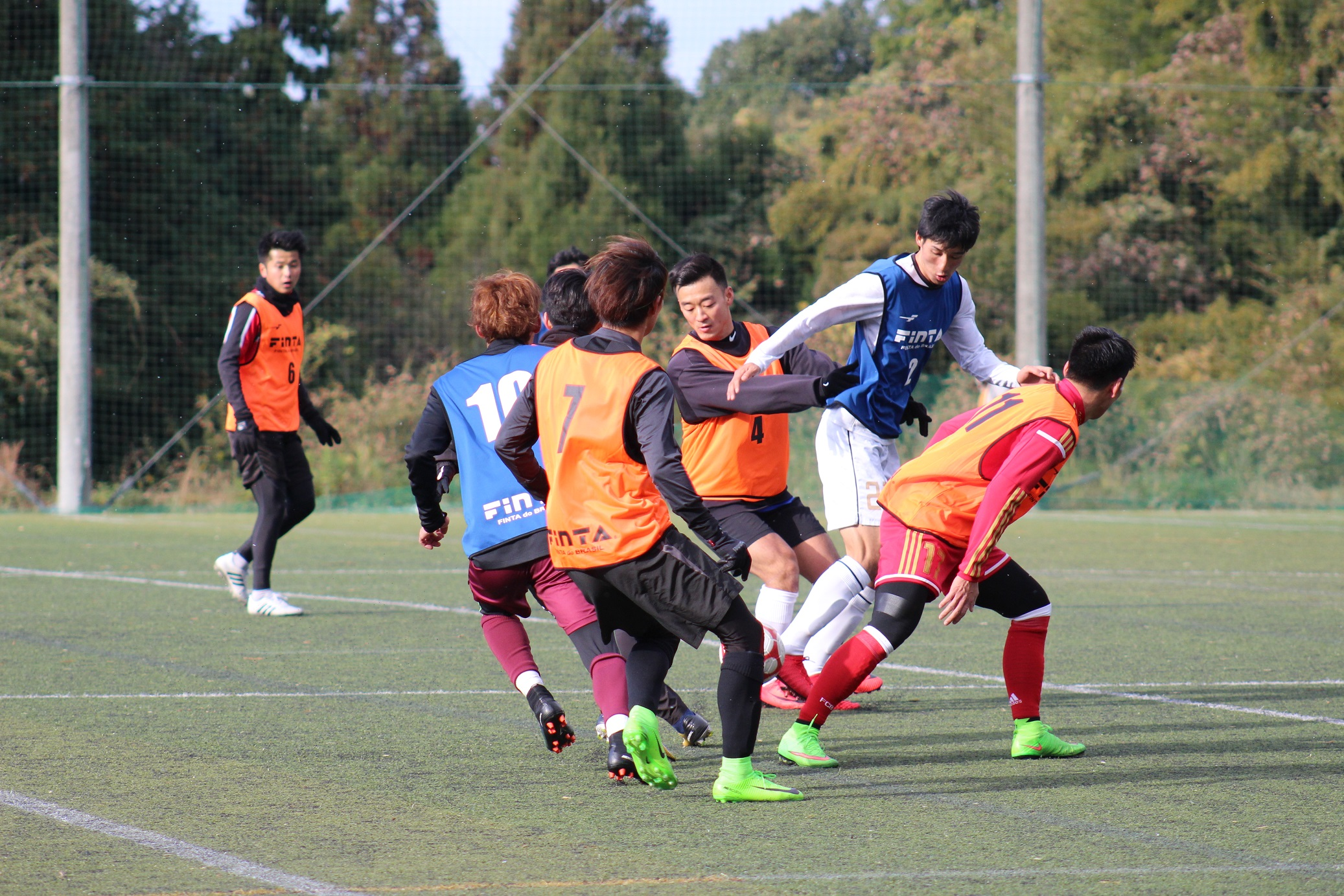
  A lot of talented Japanese and Korean players participated in the Pro combine in Fukuoka.

=== 2018: Third Season ===
==== Zest FC Women Announces New Affiliation with Japan's First Division Club AC Nagano Parceiro Ladies ====
- San Diego Zest FC has announced that its women’s team, San Diego Zest FC Women, which will be competing its inaugural season in Women’s Premier Soccer League this summer, has affiliated with Japanese club AC Nagano Parceiro Ladies, which currently competes in Japan’s women’s first division. AC Nagano Parceiro Ladies was established in 2000. The team is owned by AC Nagano Parceiro, which competes in Japan’s Men’s third division, J3 League. Former Parceiro Ladies player, Kumi Yokohama, has been selected for Japan’s national team squad since 2015 and currently plays for FFC Frankfurt, which competes in the first division of Women’s Bundesliga.

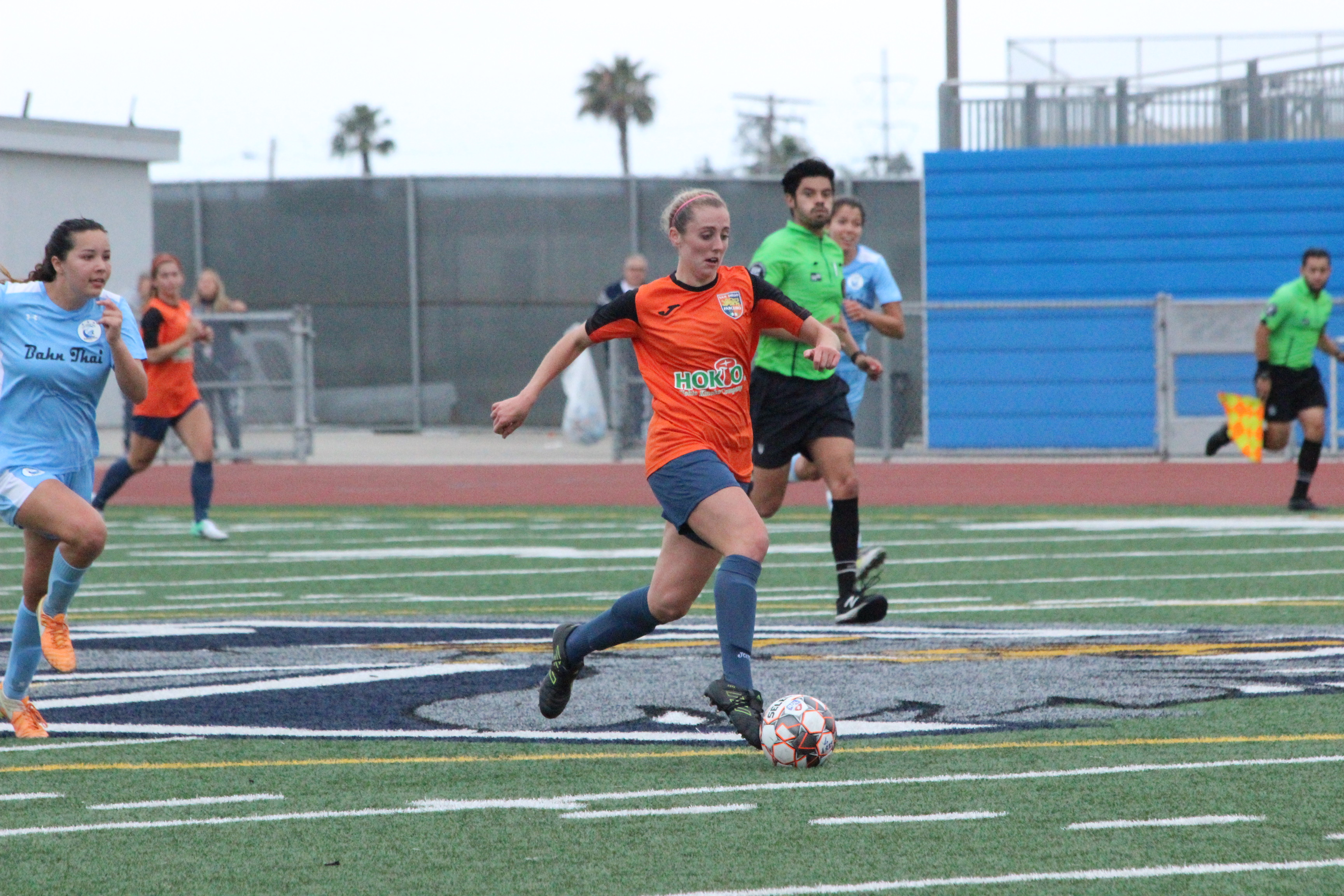
San Diego Parceiro Ladies had a first win on May 20 in their season opener match against San Diego WFC Sealions.

== Year-by-year ==
| Year | Division | League | Regular season | Playoffs | Open Cup |
|---|---|---|---|---|---|
| 2016 | 4 | USL PDL | 2nd, Southwest | Divisional Playoff | Did not enter |
| 2017 | 4 | USL PDL | 7th, Southwest | Did not qualify | First round |
| 2018 | 4 | USL PDL | 8th, Southwest | Did not qualify | Did not qualify |
| 2019 | 4 | USL League Two | 7th, Southwest | Did not qualify | Did not qualify |

== Head coaches ==
- (Turkey) Cem Tont, Asst. Neal Keith (2016–2017)
- (South Korea) Jaewoo Kim (2018–present)

== Coaching staff ==
| Role | Name | Nation |
|---|---|---|
| Head coach | Jaewoo Kim | South Korea |
| Assistant Coach | Jake Rowley | United Kingdom |
| Assistant Coach | Dong Rack Kim | South Korea |

== Players ==
As of May 3, 2019
Note: Flags indicate national team as defined under FIFA eligibility rules; some limited exceptions apply. Players may hold more than one non-FIFA nationality. Squad correct as of May 3, 2019.

| No. | Pos. | Nation | Player |
|---|---|---|---|
| 1 | GK | USA | Rodrigo Sarmiento |
| 2 | DF | USA | Jamie Pick |
| 3 | DF | FRA | Abdoulaye Cissoko |
| 4 | DF | USA | Kelee Cornfield-Saunders |
| 5 | DF | USA | Tosh Samkange |
| 6 | MF | USA | Sam Turner |
| 8 | MF | USA | Brandon Santel |
| 9 | FW | USA | Vardhin Manoj |
| 11 | FW | KOR | Sungyong Jung |
| 12 | DF | USA | Joe Daluz |
| 13 | MF | USA | Andy Sartor |
| 14 | MF | KOR | Lee SeongYong |
| 15 | FW | JPN | Kazuma Suzuki |
| 16 | DF | USA | Griffin Mallas |
| 17 | MF | USA | Erick Gonzalez |
| 18 | MF | USA | Hanif Wright |
| 19 | DF | USA | Santiago Majewski |
| 20 | MF | JPN | Shizu Yohena |
| 21 | MF | FRA | Nicolas Briere |
| 22 | MF | USA | Landen Carlson |
| 23 | DF | USA | Christopher Brusenback |

=== Notable former players ===
This list of notable former players comprises players who went on to play professional soccer after playing for the team in the Premier Development League, or those who previously played professionally before joining the team.

- (United States) Brian Iloski (2016, UCLA Bruins to Legia Warsaw)
- (United States) Erik Holt (2016, UCLA Bruins to Real Salt Lake)
- (United States) Justin Fiddes (2016, Washington Huskies to Vancouver Whitecaps FC)
- (United States) Don Tchilao (2017, Oregon State Beavers to LA Galaxy II)
- (France) Abdoulaye Cissoko (2019, Tacoma Defiance to Seattle Sounders FC)

== Average Attendance ==
- 2016: 365
- 2017: 293
- 2018: 121
- 2019: TBD
