= L.A. Wolves FC =

Amateur soccer club

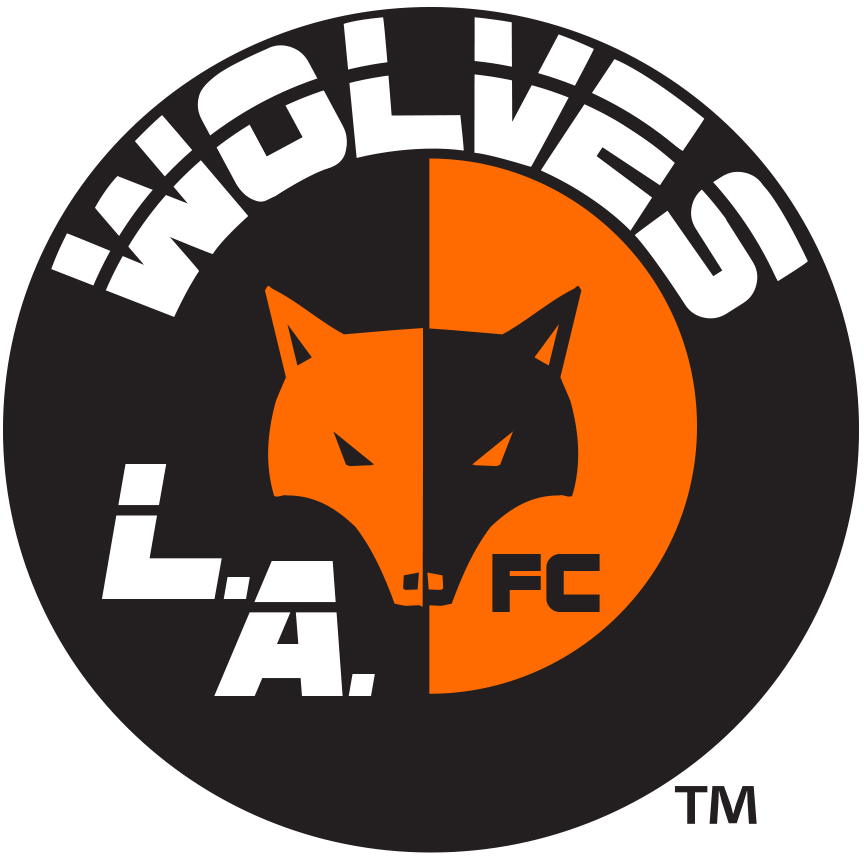
- Full name: L.A. Wolves FC
- Nicknames: Wolves, Lobos
- Founded: 2014
- Ground: Long Beach City College, Long Beach, California
- Chairman: Yan Skwara
- Manager: Nyder Chardonnay (men's) Jack Gidney (women's)
- League: United Premier Soccer League
- Website: https://www.lawolvesfc.com/
Home colors	Away colors

L.A. Wolves FC is an American semi-pro soccer club based in Los Angeles County, California. They are named after the Los Angeles Wolves who played in the United Soccer Association in 1967 and in the North American Soccer League in 1968.

The club features its men's pro development first team, L.A. Wolves FC (United Premier Soccer League), its women's pro development team, and its youth academy.

== History ==
Club owner and UPSL Commissioner Yan Skwara re-launched L.A. Wolves FC in 2014 with the aspiration of turning professional. L.A. Wolves play their home games in Long Beach and are a current member of the United Premier Soccer League (UPSL), a direct member of the US Soccer Federation.

On August 30, 2014 the L.A. Wolves played their first match, a 6–0 victory in a friendly over the Orange County Crew SC at Toyota Sports Complex.

On 18 December 2018, the Wolves announced a player development affiliation with Orange County SC of the USL Championship.

On February 27th 2026, the L.A. Wolves announced a Pro Pathway partnership with Belmopan FC (CONCACAF) out of Belize which will serve as an outlet for its players' path to professionalism.

== Lamar Hunt U.S. Open Cup ==
L.A. Wolves FC is a four-time participant in Open Qualifying for the Lamar Hunt U.S. Open Cup, and has twice advanced to the tournament's Third Round (2016–17).

During the club's opening USOC qualification effort in 2016, Wolves FC defeated Del Rey City SC (UPSL) and Cal FC (UPSL) to advance to the tournament proper. In the First Round, Wolves FC walked over Ventura County Fusion of the Premier Development League by way of protest and disqualification, due to VC Fusion fielding of an ineligible player. Wolves FC followed with a 4–2 shootout victory in the Second Round over Orange County Blues FC of the United Soccer League before falling to La Máquina FC (UPSL), 2–0, in the Third Round. La Maquina FC went on to lose, 4–2 in overtime, to L.A. Galaxy of Major League Soccer.

October 24, 2016; First Qualifying Round	L.A. Wolves FC (UPSL)	3–1	Del Rey City SC (UPSL)	Torrance, CA
8:00 PMPDT	3	Report	1	Stadium: Toyota Sports Complex

November 21, 2016; Second Qualifying Round	L.A. Wolves FC (UPSL)	2–1	Cal FC (Simi Valley Soccer League / UPSL)	Torrance, CA
7:30 PMPDT	2	Report	1	Stadium: Toyota Sports Complex

May 11, 2016; First Round	Ventura County Fusion (PDL)	Forfeit	L.A. Wolves FC (UPSL)	Ventura, CA
7:00 PMPDT		Report		Stadium: Ventura College Sportsplex

May 18, 2016; Second Round	L.A. Wolves FC (UPSL)	1–1 (a.e.t.) (4–2 p)	Orange County Blues FC (USL)	Wilmington, CA
8:00 PMPDT	1	Report	1	Stadium: Ventura College Sportsplex; Referee: Vincent Apple-Chiarella

June 1, 2016; Third Round	La Máquina FC (UPSL)	2–0	L.A. Wolves FC (UPSL)	Westminster, CA
8:00 PMPDT	2	Report	0	Stadium: Westminster High School; Referee: Timothy Ford

=== International results ===
==== L.A. Wolves FC vs Monarcas Morelia U-20 ====
The Wolves played Liga MX's Monarcas Morelia U-20 squad to a 4–4 draw on November 13, 2014, in a friendly in Inglewood, CA.

==== L.A. Wolves FC vs Club America U-20 ====
On Sunday, July 12, 2015, the Wolves lost 5–0 to Club América U-20 squad in a friendly at Mira Costa High School Soccer Stadium in Manhattan Beach, CA.

== Historic 2017 Spring Season ==
League or Cup Name	GP	W	L	GF	GA	DIF
UPSL Spring Season	12	11	1	50	8	+42
US Open Cup	3	2	1	5	3	+2
National Amateur Cup	6	5	1	30	2	+28
SoCal State Cup	5	5	0	30	10	+20
Total Games	26	23	3	115	23	+92

== Head coaches ==
- Yan Skwara (Spring/Fall 2014, Spring/Fall 2016 & Fall 2017)
- Costa Skouras (Spring/Fall 2015)
- Eric Wynalda (Spring 2017)
- Felipe Bernal (2018–2019)
- Hiatus (2020-2024)
- Kley Bejarno (2025-2026)
- Nyder Chardonnay (2026-current) (men's)
- Jack Gidney (2026-current) (women's)

== Notable players ==
- Delfino Zea - F.C Dallas
- Paolo Cardozo – L.A. Galaxy (MLS)
- Cameron Marlow – Queen's Park Football Club (Scotland)
- Eugene Martinez - Vancouver FC

== See also ==
- Los Angeles Wolves (1967–68)
