= 2026 National Premier Soccer League season =

American amateur soccer league season

National Premier Soccer League
- Season: 2026
- Dates: May 2 – July 4 (regular season)
- Champions: El Farolito (2nd Title)
- Regular season title: Bristol Rhythm AFC (1st Title)
- Matches: 294
- Goals: 1,323 (4.5 per match)
- Best player: Diego Pinto (Ambassadors FC Ohio)
- Top goalscorer: Patryk Rojek (Philadelphia Ukrainian Nationals) 14 goals in 10 matches
- Best goalkeeper: Noe Delmotte (Bristol Rhythm AFC)
- Biggest home win: El Farolito SC 12–0 Real San Jose (4/27); Michigan Rangers FC 12–0 Southern Indiana Guardians (5/9); Ambassadors FC Ohio 12–0 Niagara 1812 (6/27)
- Biggest away win: Hershey FC 0–15 West Chester United SC (6/3)
- Highest scoring: Hershey FC 0–15 West Chester United SC (6/3)
- All statistics correct as of 23:53, July 10, 2026 (UTC).

The 2026 National Premier Soccer League season is the 24th season of the National Premier Soccer League.

The regular season began on May 2 and is set to end on July 4. In total, 55 teams are set to participate in this season in 8 conferences.

On July 9, U.S. Soccer announced that the 2026 Champions and two additional teams would qualify directly for the 2027 U.S. Open Cup.

== Teams ==
Note: Teams that are italicized previously played in the NPSL and are returning from hiatus.

=== Incoming teams ===
- AC Newport
- Dakota Fusion FC
- Hub City FC
- Mint Hill FC
- Santa Cruz FC
- Statesville FC
- Sun City FC
- Vacaville Elite

=== Departing teams ===
- Appalachian FC (joined USL2)
- Arkansas Wolves FC (attempting to join NISA)
- FC Florida (joined Florida Champions League)
- Fort Worth Vaqueros FC (joined USL2)
- Hickory FC (joined USL2)
- Iowa Demon Hawks (kept team in MASL2)
- Jacksonville Armada U-23 (joined Florida Champions League)
- Lubbock Matadors SC (joined USL2)
- Naples United FC (played independent schedule)
- Oklahoma United FC (joined TLFC)
- Pennsylvania Classics AC (joined USL2)
- Port City FC (joined USL2)
- PSC FC Florida (joined TLFC)
- Syracuse FC (kept team in UPSL)
- West Texas FC (joined USL2)

=== Teams on hiatus or folded ===
- Alexandria Rough Diamonds
- Brownsville NPSL
- California Odyssey SC
- CF10 Houston FC
- Club de Lyon
- Electric City Shock SC
- Global Soccer Pathways
- Hartford City FC
- Miami Dutch Lions FC
- New Orleans Jesters
- Philadelphia Union
- Sacramento Gold FC
- San Leandro United FC

== Standings and results ==
=== Central States Conference ===
Pos	Team	Pld	W	T	L	GF	GA	GD	Pts	PPG	Qualification
1	Michigan Rangers FC (Q)	10	7	1	2	40	13	+27	22	2.20	Gateway Conference playoffs
2	FC Pride (Q)	10	6	2	2	37	15	+22	20	2.00	Gateway Conference playoffs
3	Gio's Lions SC Chicago (Q)	10	5	2	3	24	17	+7	17	1.70	Gateway Conference playoffs
4	FC Milwaukee Torrent (Q)	10	5	1	4	29	21	+8	16	1.60	Gateway Conference playoffs
5	Wisconsin Conquerors FC (E)	10	4	0	6	16	30	−14	12	1.20	
6	Southern Indiana Guardians FC (E)	10	0	0	10	10	60	−50	0	0.00	

Updated to match(es) played on July 1, 2026. Source: NPSL
(E) Eliminated; (Q) Qualified for the phase indicated

=== Golden Gate Conference ===
Pos	Team	Pld	W	T	L	GF	GA	GD	Pts	PPG	Qualification
1	El Farolito (Q)	10	8	2	0	50	6	+44	26	2.60	Golden Gate Conference playoffs
2	Oakland Stompers (Q)	10	6	2	2	39	19	+20	20	2.00	Golden Gate Conference playoffs
3	Sun City FC (Q)	8	4	1	3	29	9	+20	13	1.63	Golden Gate Conference playoffs
4	Cruziers FC (Q)	10	4	2	4	29	21	+8	14	1.40	Golden Gate Conference playoffs
5	Vacaville Elite (E)	10	2	2	6	10	52	−42	8	0.80	
6	Real San Jose (E)	10	0	1	9	9	59	−50	1	0.10	

Updated to match(es) played on July 7, 2026. Source: NPSL
(E) Eliminated; (Q) Qualified for the phase indicated

=== Great Lakes Conference ===
Pos	Team	Pld	W	T	L	GF	GA	GD	Pts	PPG	Qualification
1	Erie Commodores (Q)	12	10	1	1	35	6	+29	31	2.58	Great Lakes Conference Semifinal
2	Ambassadors FC Ohio (Q)	12	9	0	3	39	12	+27	27	2.25	Great Lakes Conference Semifinal
3	Cleveland SC (Q)	12	7	1	4	26	15	+11	22	1.83	Great Lakes Conference Semifinal
4	Flower City Union (Q)	12	4	3	5	20	15	+5	15	1.25	Great Lakes Conference Semifinal
5	Rochester NY FC Academy (E)	12	3	3	6	17	26	−9	12	1.00	
6	Buffalo Stallions (E)	12	2	1	9	14	43	−29	7	0.58	
7	Niagara 1812 (E)	12	1	3	8	12	46	−34	6	0.50	

Updated to match(es) played on July 7, 2026. Source: NPSL
(E) Eliminated; (Q) Qualified for the phase indicated

=== Keystone Conference ===
Pos	Team	Pld	W	T	L	GF	GA	GD	Pts	PPG	Qualification
1	Jackson Lions FC (Q)	10	7	1	2	43	19	+24	22	2.20	Keystone East Conference playoffs
2	West Chester United SC (Q)	10	6	4	0	57	27	+30	22	2.20	Keystone East Conference playoffs
3	Philadelphia Ukrainians Nationals SC (Q)	10	6	2	2	41	21	+20	20	2.00	Keystone East Conference playoffs
4	FC Motown (Q)	10	6	1	3	24	14	+10	19	1.90	Keystone East Conference playoffs
5	West Chester Predators (E)	10	3	3	4	33	31	+2	12	1.20	
6	New Jersey United AC (E)	10	3	2	5	24	24	0	11	1.10	
7	Player's Development Academy (E)	10	2	1	7	19	32	−13	7	0.70	
8	Hershey FC (E)	10	0	0	10	6	79	−73	0	0.00	

Updated to match(es) played on July 7, 2026. Source: NPSL
(E) Eliminated; (Q) Qualified for the phase indicated

=== Mid-Atlantic Conference ===
Pos	Team	Pld	W	T	L	GF	GA	GD	Pts	PPG	Qualification
1	Ristozi FC (Q)	10	8	0	2	32	12	+20	24	2.40	Mid-Atlantic Conference playoffs
2	Virginia Dream FC (Q)	10	7	1	2	30	13	+17	22	2.20	Mid-Atlantic Conference playoffs
3	Virginia Atlantic FC (Q)	10	6	0	4	18	18	0	18	1.80	Mid-Atlantic Conference playoffs
4	Alexandria Reds (Q)	10	5	1	4	21	14	+7	16	1.60	Mid-Atlantic Conference playoffs
5	Grove United (E)	10	5	0	5	15	19	−4	15	1.50	
6	FC Frederick (E)	10	4	2	4	22	29	−7	14	1.40	
7	District Elite FC (E)	10	4	1	5	21	21	0	13	1.30	
8	Hub City FC (E)	10	2	1	7	18	34	−16	7	0.70	
9	DMV Elite FC (E)	10	1	0	9	8	25	−17	3	0.30	

Updated to match(es) played on July 7, 2026. Source: NPSL
(E) Eliminated; (Q) Qualified for the phase indicated

=== North Atlantic Conference ===
Pos	Team	Pld	W	T	L	GF	GA	GD	Pts	PPG	Qualification
1	New Haven United FC (Q)	10	6	2	2	21	14	+7	20	2.00	North Atlantic Conference Semifinal
2	New York Shockers (Q)	10	6	1	3	28	16	+12	19	1.90	North Atlantic Conference Semifinal
3	American Soccer Club New York (Q)	10	4	4	2	24	16	+8	16	1.60	North Atlantic Conference Semifinal
4	AC Newport (E)	10	4	2	4	25	24	+1	14	1.40	
5	Stana Cruz FC (E)	10	4	2	4	16	20	−4	14	1.40	
6	OSNER'S FC (E)	10	0	1	9	8	32	−24	1	0.10	

Source: NPSL
(E) Eliminated; (Q) Qualified for the phase indicated

=== North Conference ===
Pos	Team	Pld	W	T	L	GF	GA	GD	Pts	PPG	Qualification
1	Siouxland United FC (Q)	10	7	3	0	25	7	+18	24	2.40	North Conference playoffs
2	Duluth FC (Q)	10	6	3	1	26	9	+17	21	2.10	North Conference playoffs
3	Dakota Fusion FC (Q)	10	5	1	4	24	17	+7	16	1.60	North Conference playoffs
4	Minnesota Blizzard FC (Q)	10	2	3	5	12	19	−7	9	0.90	North Conference playoffs
5	Sioux Falls Thunder FC (E)	10	2	2	6	13	28	−15	8	0.80	
6	Joy AC (E)	10	2	0	8	11	31	−20	6	0.60	

Source: NPSL
(E) Eliminated; (Q) Qualified for the phase indicated

=== Southeast Conference ===
Pos	Team	Pld	W	T	L	GF	GA	GD	Pts	PPG	Qualification
1	Bristol Rhythm AFC (Q)	10	9	1	0	21	6	+15	28	2.80	Southeast Conference playoffs
2	865 Alliance (Q)	10	4	2	4	17	15	+2	14	1.40	Southeast Conference playoffs
3	Statesville FC (Q)	10	4	2	4	21	14	+7	14	1.40	Southeast Conference playoffs
4	Greenville United (Q)	10	4	2	4	15	17	−2	14	1.40	Southeast Conference playoffs
5	Charlottetowne Hops FC (E)	10	3	2	5	13	14	−1	11	1.10	
6	Mint Hill FC (E)	10	3	1	6	11	22	−11	10	1.00	
7	Burlington United FC (E)	10	2	2	6	16	26	−10	8	0.80	

Source: NPSL
(E) Eliminated; (Q) Qualified for the phase indicated

== Playoffs ==
Notes: Games are hosted by the highest seed unless noted otherwise. NPSL announced all Playoff formats, except for Golden Gate Conference, on June 10.

=== Conference playoffs ===
==== Central States Conference playoffs ====
Semifinals; July 8
**1**	**Michigan Rangers FC**	**3**
4	FC Milwaukee Torrent	2
**2**	**FC Pride**	**4**
3	Gio's Lions SC Chicago	2

Finals; July 11
**1**	**Michigan Rangers FC**	**4**
2	FC Pride	0

Bold = winner
* = after extra time, ( ) = penalty shootout score, FF = forfeit

July 8, 2026 Conference Semifinal	**Michigan Rangers FC**	**3–2**	FC Milwaukee Torrent	Byron Center, Michigan
6:00 PM CT	Baumann 8', 39'; Mendez 79'; Wilhelm (yellow card) 80'		Espinosa Jr (yellow card) 12'; Huwiler 29' (pen.); Kaup 35'	Stadium: Byron Center High School West Athletic Complex

July 8, 2026 Conference Semifinal	**FC Pride**	**4–2**	Gio's Lions SC Chicago	Lawrence, Indiana
7:00 PM CT	Thompson 10'; Wesseling 13'; Kurzawa 23' (yellow card) 88'; Swartzendruber (yellow card) 90'; Nakamae 90+1'		Abdulwahab 16', 35'; Dimitrijevic (yellow card) 19'	Stadium: Pride Performance Center

July 12, 2026 Conference Final	**Michigan Rangers FC**	**4–0**	FC Pride	Caledonia, Michigan
1:00 PM CT	Takawira 16'; Baumann 44'; Power 84'; Williams 89'	Report	Longo (yellow card) 83'	Stadium: Davenport University Farmers Insurance Athletic Complex

==== Golden Gate Conference playoffs ====
Semifinals; July 10
**1**	**El Farolito**	**4**
4	Cruziers FC	0
2	Oakland Stompers	0
**3**	**Sun City FC**	**5**

Finals; July 12
**1**	**El Farolito**	**2**
3	Sun City FC	0

Bold = winner
* = after extra time, ( ) = penalty shootout score, FF = forfeit

July 10, 2026 Conference Semifinals	Oakland Stompers	**0–5**	**Sun City FC**	Hayward, California
7:15 PM CT	Downes (yellow card) 77'; Ramirez (yellow card) 80'		Legarda 15' (yellow card) 80'; Tamayo (yellow card) 19'; Meza (yellow card) 40'; Vizcarra 41', 64'; Vejsmose 44'; Carriel (yellow card) 56'; Tarin 85'	Stadium: Chabot College

July 10, 2026 Conference Semifinals	**El Farolito**	**4–0**	Cruziers FC	Fremont, California
8:30 PM CT	Kreye 1', 27'; Soto 43'; Valdivia 53'			Stadium: Ohlone College Soccer Field

July 12, 2026 Conference Final	**El Farolito**	**2–0**	Sun City FC	San Francisco, California
7:00 PM CT	Kreye 28'; García (red card) 43'; Cifuentes (yellow card) 45+7'; Benson (yellow card) 50' (goal) 64' (pen.)		S. Mejia (yellow card) 36' (yellow-red card) 45+7'; Meza (yellow card) 45+3'; Vejsmose (yellow card) 45+6'; Castillo (yellow card) 45+7'; Vizcarra (yellow card) 58'; Rueda (red card) 61'; Carriel (yellow card) 75'; Ulloa (yellow card) 89'	Stadium: Kezar Stadium

==== Great Lakes Conference playoffs ====
Semifinals; July 8
1	Erie Commodores FC	1
**4**	**Flower City Union**	**2**
**2**	**Ambassadors FC Ohio**	**2**
3	Cleveland SC	0

Finals; July 11
4	Flower City Union	1
**2**	**Ambassadors FC Ohio**	**2**

Bold = winner
* = after extra time, ( ) = penalty shootout score, FF = forfeit

July 8, 2026 Conference Semifinal	Erie Commodores FC	**1–2**	**Flower City Union**	Erie, Pennsylvania
6:00 PM CT	Jaime (yellow card) 30'; Ros (yellow card) 33'; Temitayo (yellow card) 45+3' (goal) 73'; Silva (yellow card) 88'; Bustamante (yellow card) 90+1'		Avallone 23'; Nelson (yellow card) 30'; Safari 87'	Stadium: Saxon Stadium

July 8, 2026 Conference Semifinal	**Ambassadors FC Ohio**	**2–0**	Cleveland SC	Canton, Ohio
6:00 PM CT	Spratt 10' (yellow card) 45+2'; Smith-Skladany (yellow card) 56'; Akins (yellow card) 63'; Pinto (yellow card) 82'		Gotting (yellow card) 87'; Sandahl (yellow card) 90+6'; Romero (yellow card) 90+8'	Stadium: Dr. David & Winnie King Field

July 11, 2026 Conference Final	**Ambassadors FC Ohio**	**2–1**	Flower City Union	Canton, Ohio
6:00 PM CT	Zemanski (yellow card) 30', (goal) 53'; Pinto 62'; Akins (yellow card) 73'	Report	Rippe (yellow card) 25'; Masucci (yellow card) 77'; O'Dwyer-Hall (yellow card) 85'; Murphy 90+3'	Stadium: Dr. David & Winnie King Field

==== North Conference playoffs ====
Semifinals; July 8
**1**	**Siouxland United FC**	**4**
4	Minnesota Blizzard FC	1
**2**	**Duluth FC**	**4**
3	Dakota Fusion FC	2

Finals; July 11
1	Siouxland United FC	0
**2**	**Duluth FC**	**3**

Bold = winner
* = after extra time, ( ) = penalty shootout score, FF = forfeit

July 8, 2026 Conference Semifinal	**Siouxland United FC**	**4–1**	Minnesota Blizzard FC	Sioux City, Iowa
6:00 PM CT	Urakami 19', 53' (yellow card) 50'; Inagaki 66', 73'		Langendam (yellow card) 22'; Zich 37'; Esteban (yellow card) 55'; Snyder (yellow card) 75'	Stadium: Bishop Heelan Memorial Field

July 8, 2026 Conference Semifinal	**Duluth FC**	**4–2**	Dakota Fusion FC	Duluth, Minnesota
7:00 PM CT	Davidson 4', 46'; Magalhaes (yellow card) 51'; Cervantes (yellow card) 59'; Wyles (yellow card) 62'; Soulemana 77'; Carles 90'		Green (yellow card) 6' (goal) 88'; Wilkening 17'; Yamaguchi (yellow card) 63' (yellow-red card) 63'; Abrahim (yellow card) 70'	Stadium: Walt Hunting Stadium

July 11, 2026 Conference Final	Siouxland United FC	**0–3**	**Duluth FC**	Sioux City, Iowa
12:00 PM CT	Urakami (yellow card) 39'; Cohen (yellow card) 55'	Report	Magalhaes 32', 78'; Davidson 52'; Carles (yellow card) 90+3'	Stadium: Bishop Heelan Memorial Field

==== Southeast Conference playoffs ====
Semifinals; July 8
**1**	**Bristol Rhythm AFC**	**2 (8)**
4	Greenville United	2 (7)
**2**	**865 Alliance**	**1**
3	Statesville FC	0

Finals; July 11
**1**	**Bristol Rhythm AFC**	**4**
2	865 Alliance	1

Bold = winner
* = after extra time, ( ) = penalty shootout score, FF = forfeit

July 8, 2026 Conference Semifinal	**Bristol Rhythm AFC**	**2–2** (a.e.t.) (**8–7** p)	Greenville United	Bristol, Virginia
6:00 PM CT	Enchill (yellow card) 29'; Thompson (yellow card) 55' (goal) 90+8'; Jorge Gracia 69' (yellow card) 90+4'; Ojeda (yellow card) 120'		Mensah (yellow card) 19'; Ivanov (yellow card) 43' (goal) 81'; Sevalie-Gborie 68'; Fall (yellow card) 80'	Stadium: Gene Malcolm Stadium; Attendance: 430
	**Penalties**
	Edwards (penalty scored); Jorge Gracia (penalty scored); Lattanzi (penalty scored); Slinn (penalty scored); Salkeld (penalty scored); Klamler (penalty scored); Martinez (penalty scored); Ojeda (penalty scored)		(penalty scored) Mensah; (penalty scored) Fofana; (penalty scored) Sevalie-Gborie; (penalty scored) Fall; (penalty scored) Salazar; (penalty scored) Richter; (penalty scored) Balonge

July 8, 2026 Conference Semifinal	**865 Alliance**	**1–0**	Statesville FC	Knoxville, Tennessee
6:00 PM CT	Argueta 13'; Coles (yellow card) 36'; Lambert (yellow card) 85'; Rodrigues (yellow card) 90+4'		Buitendijk (yellow card) 42'	Stadium: Hawk Stadium

July 11, 2026 Conference Final	**Bristol Rhythm AFC**	**4–1**	865 Alliance	Bristol, Virginia
6:00 PM CT	Edwards 7'; Salkeld (yellow card) 15'; Thompson 44', 63'; Enchill 59'; Vorbrich (yellow card) 86'	Report	Castro (yellow card) 31'; Quigley (yellow card) 45+3'; Baker (yellow card) 56'; Dukes 89'	Stadium: Gene Malcolm Stadium; Attendance: 555

==== Keystone Conference playoffs ====
Semifinals; July 8
1	Jackson Lions FC	1
**4**	**FC Motown**	**3**
**2**	**West Chester United SC**	**4**
3	Philadelphia Ukrainians Nationals SC	3

Finals; July 11
4	FC Motown	1
**2**	**West Chester United SC**	**2**

Bold = winner
* = after extra time, ( ) = penalty shootout score, FF = forfeit

July 8, 2026 Conference Semifinal	Jackson Lions FC	**1–3**	**FC Motown**	Toms River, New Jersey
6:00 PM CT	Abbey 44'; Fala (yellow card) 66'; Jarusevicius (yellow card) 83'; Sanchez (yellow card) 84'		Germain 11'; Perez (yellow card) 18'; Collins 45'; Mcgregor 47' (yellow card) 65'; Bermudez (yellow card) 84'	Stadium: Donovan Catholic High School

July 8, 2026 Conference Semifinal	**West Chester United SC**	**4–3**	Philadelphia Ukrainians Nationals SC	West Chester, Pennsylvania
6:30 PM CT	Ricks 4'; Robinson (yellow card) 53'; Weaver 63'; Zhang 65'; Slack (yellow card) 78'; Gomaa 90+6'		Brown 7'; Zama 50', 67' (pen.); Murray (yellow card) 79'	Stadium: Kildare's Field

July 11, 2026 Conference Final	**West Chester United SC**	**2–1**	FC Motown	West Chester, Pennsylvania
6:30 PM CT	Zhang (yellow card) 22'; Weaver (yellow card) 25'; Gomaa 38'; Demars (yellow card) 42'; Robinson 65'; Costin (yellow card) 82'	Report	Mcgregor 42'; Perez (yellow card) 49'; Ouedraogo (yellow card) 89'	Stadium: Kildare's Field

==== Mid-Atlantic Conference playoffs ====
Semifinals; July 8
**1**	**Ristozi FC**	**4**
4	Alexandria Reds	1
**2**	**Virginia Dream FC**	**4***
3	Virginia Atlantic FC	3

Finals; July 11
**1**	**Ristozi FC**	**2**
2	Virginia Dream FC	1

Bold = winner
* = after extra time, ( ) = penalty shootout score, FF = forfeit

July 8, 2026 Conference Semifinal	**Ristozi FC**	**4–1**	Alexandria Reds	Owings Mills, Maryland
6:00 PM CT	Petty 10', 59'; Webb-Johnson (yellow card) 34'; Miyahara 36', 74'; Gansallo (yellow card) 38'; Ono (yellow card) 53'; Inaba (yellow card) 81'; Pastore (yellow card) 90'		Marbray (red card) 8'; Waller 50'; Vandehei (yellow card) 84'; Androus (yellow card) 90'	Stadium: Mustang Stadium

July 8, 2026 Conference Semifinal	**Virginia Dream FC**	**4–3** (a.e.t.)	Virginia Atlantic FC	Falls Church, Virginia
7:45 PM CT	Diarra 17'; Slavov 53'; Akinkoye 57'; Emson 97'		Togashi (yellow card) 10'; Harris 20', 42' (yellow card) 104'; Thomas 39'; Kilosho (yellow card) 113'	Stadium: Meridian High School Stadium

July 11, 2026 Conference Final	**Ristozi FC**	**2–1**	Virginia Dream FC	Owings Mills, Maryland
6:00 PM CT	Tubbs (yellow card) 14'; Petty 45+2'; 49' (o.g.); Davis (yellow card) 56'	Report	Diarra 16'	Stadium: Mustang Stadium

==== North Atlantic Conference playoffs ====
Semifinals; July 8			Finals; July 11
			1	New Haven United FC
2	New York Shockers	1	3	American Soccer Club New York
**3**	**American Soccer Club New York**	**3**

Bold = winner
* = after extra time, ( ) = penalty shootout score, FF = forfeit

July 8, 2026 Conference Semifinal	New York Shockers	**1–3**	**American Soccer Club New York**	Colonie, New York
6:00 PM CT	DaCosta (yellow card) 20'; Apolon (yellow card) 70'; Hallinan (yellow card) 79'; Pederson 87'; Fazio (yellow card) 90+5'		Mejia (yellow card) 7'; Rosero 58', 61'; Walker 90+3'; Romero (yellow card) 90+4'	Stadium: Afrim's Sports Park

July 12, 2026 Conference Final	**New Haven United FC**	**2–2** (a.e.t.) (**5–4** p)	**American Soccer Club New York**	New Haven, Connecticut
5:30 PM CT	Meira 13'; Samms (yellow card) 17'; Hendriks (yellow card) 45+3'; Malango (yellow card) 68'; Taleb (yellow card) 90+5'; Loura 90+6'; Almeida (yellow card) 90+7'; Rodriguez (yellow card) 90+7'		Nicolaou (yellow card) 12' (yellow-red card) 62'; Mejia 22' (yellow card) 30'; Sanchez 90+5' (pen.) (yellow card) 90+5'; Romero (yellow card) 90+5'; Mena (yellow card) 105'	Stadium: University of New Haven
	**Penalties**
	Alessio (penalty scored); Bermudez (penalty scored); Morgan (penalty scored); Germano (penalty scored); Fogarty (penalty scored)		(penalty scored) Sanchez; (penalty scored) Kirilenko; (penalty scored) Wagner; (penalty scored) Adamek

=== National playoffs ===
Quarterfinal matchups are predetermined. Hosts will be determinted by Regular Season PPG. National Semifinals will be determined by the league based on geographic and/or economic factors.

Quarterfinals; July 18
**SE**	**Bristol Rhythm AFC**	**2**
MA	Ristozi FC	1
KS	West Chester United SC	2
**NA**	**New Haven United FC**	**4**
**GL**	**Ambassadors FC Ohio**	**3**
CS	Michigan Rangers FC	1
NT	Duluth FC	0
**GG**	**El Farolito**	**3**

Semifinals; July 25
**Bristol Rhythm AFC**	**2**
New Haven United FC	0
Ambassadors FC Ohio	2
**El Farolito**	**3**

Finals; August 1
Bristol Rhythm AFC	0
**El Farolito**	**3**

Bold = winner
* = after extra time, ( ) = penalty shootout score, FF = forfeit

==== National Quarterfinals ====
July 18, 2026	**Bristol Rhythm AFC**	**2–1**	Ristozi FC	Bristol, Virginia
7:00 pm EDT	Gracia 27', 35'; Slinn (yellow card) 62'; Enchill (yellow card) 90'		Gansallo 18'	Stadium: Gene Malcolm Stadium; Attendance: 690

July 18, 2026	**Ambassadors FC Ohio**	**3–1** (a.e.t.)	Michigan Rangers FC	Canton, Ohio
7:00 pm EDT	Akins (yellow card) 76'; 89' (o.g.); French 92'; Spratt 98'; Pinto (yellow card) 105'		Postlewait (yellow card) 54'; Hall 63'; Jansen (yellow card) 112' (yellow-red card) 116'	Stadium: Dr. David & Winnie King Field

July 18, 2026	West Chester United SC	**2–4**	**New Haven United FC**	Chester, Pennsylvania
7:00 pm EDT	Ricks 26'; Gomaa (yellow card) 30'; Brenes (yellow card) 67'; Burris 68'; Axtman (red card) 80'; Robinson (yellow card) 90'		Almeida 17'; Alessio 35', 64'; Malango (yellow card) 42'; Taleb 45+1' (yellow card) 52'; Loura (yellow card) 50'	Stadium: WSFS Bank Sportsplex

July 18, 2026	**El Farolito**	**3–0**	Duluth FC	San Francisco, California
8:00 pm EDT	Soto 6', 59'; Cifuentes (yellow card) 24'; Martinez (yellow card) 48'; Benson 80'; Da Silva (yellow card) 86'		Nozawa (yellow card) 35'; Wilson (yellow card) 75'; Cervantes (yellow card) 87'	Stadium: Kezar Stadium

==== National Semifinals ====
July 25, 2026	**Bristol Rhythm AFC**	**2–0**	New Haven United FC	Bristol, Virginia
7:00 PM ET	Ramos 76'; Booth 87'			Stadium: Gene Malcolm Stadium; Attendance: 896

July 25, 2026	**El Farolito**	**3–2**	Ambassadors FC Ohio	Milwaukee, Wisconsin (Note: El Farolito hosted the semifinal in Milwaukee due to their participation in the 2026 National Amateur Cup Finals.)
12:00 PM ET	Soto 2'; Benson 33'; Yabur 59'		Pinto 86'; Werthmuller 90+6'	Stadium: Uihlein Soccer Park

==== 2026 NPSL National Championship Game ====
August 1, 2026
7:00 PM ET

Bristol Rhythm AFC	0-3	El Farolito
Enchill (red card) 54'; Salkeld (yellow card) 80'; Gracia (yellow card) 81'		Villareal (yellow card) 7'; Sacre 47', 90+4'; Benson 59'

Gene Malcolm Stadium, Bristol, Virginia
Attendance: 2,159

Championship MVP: (Ivory Coast) Kipre Sacre El Farolito
