= 2025 National Premier Soccer League season =

American amateur soccer league season

National Premier Soccer League
- Season: 2025
- Dates: March 17 – July 5 (regular season)
- Champions: Hickory FC (1st Title)
- Regular season title: El Farolito
- Matches: 377
- Goals: 1,538 (4.08 per match)
- Best player: (United States) Antonio Pineda (Hickory FC)
- Top goalscorer: (France) Nicolas Likulia (Virginia Dream FC) (17 Goals)
- Best goalkeeper: (United States) Kevin Gonzalez – (El Farolito)
- Biggest home win: Virginia Dream FC 14–0 Alexandria Rough Diamonds (5/4)
- Biggest away win: Alexandria Rough Diamonds 0–10 Virginia Dream FC (5/25); Hershey FC 0–10 Pennsylvania Classics AC (5/28); Alexandria Rough Diamonds 0–10 Alexandria Reds (7/05)
- Highest scoring: Virginia Dream FC 14–0 Alexandria Rough Diamonds (5/4)
- Longest winning run: El Farolito SC (12 wins)
- Longest unbeaten run: El Farolito SC (12 games)
- Longest winless run: Alexandria Rough Diamonds; Burlington United FC; Global Soccer Pathways; Hershey FC; Southern Indiana Guardians FC; Syracuse FC (10 games)
- Longest losing run: Alexandria Rough Diamonds; Hershey FC; Southern Indiana Guardians FC (10 losses) Entire Season
- All statistics correct as of July 6, 2025.

The 2025 National Premier Soccer League season is the 23rd season of the National Premier Soccer League.

The regular season began on March 17 and ends on July 5. In total, 76 teams participated in this season.

== Teams ==
Note: Teams that are italicized previously played in the NPSL and are returning from hiatus.

=== Incoming teams ===
- Ambassadors FC Ohio
- American Soccer Club New York
- Buffalo Stallions
- Burlington United FC
- Club De Lyon FC
- Cruizers FC
- District Elite FC
- FC Florida
- New Haven United FC
- Oklahoma United FC
- Osner's FC
- Players Development Academy
- FC Pride Elite
- PSC FC Florida
- Real San Jose
- Ristozi FC
- Rochester NY FC Academy
- San Leandro United FC

=== Name change ===
- Des Moines United FC renamed Iowa Demon Hawks

=== Departing teams ===
- Akron City FC (joined USL2)
- Annapolis Blues FC (joined USL2)
- Apotheos FC (joined USL2)
- Atlantic City FC (joined TLFC)
- Austin United FC (joined TLFC)
- Columbus United FC (joined USL2)
- Denton Diablos FC (joined USL2)
- FC Monmouth (joined TLFC)
- First State FC (joined TLFC)
- Kingston Stockade FC (joined TLFC)
- Laredo Heat (joined USL2)
- Las Vegas Legends (returned to NISA Nation)
- Napa Valley 1839 FC (joined TLFC)
- Oakland SC (joined TLFC)
- Oklahoma City 1889 FC (joined TLFC)
- Pensacola FC (joined TLFC)
- Steel City FC (joined USL2)
- San Ramon FC (joined TLFC)
- Sunflower State FC (joined USL2)
- Tallahassee SC (joined TLFC)

=== Teams on hiatus or folded ===
- Club Atletico Saint Louis
- Dakota Fusion FC
- Demize NPSL
- Ehtar Belleville FC
- FC Arizona
- FCAZ Tucson
- Glendale Lions FC
- Kansas City Sol
- Las Vegas Knights
- Minnesota Twin Stars
- Lions United FC
- Valeo FC

== Standings and results ==
=== West Region ===
==== Golden Gate Conference ====
Pos	Team	Pld	W	L	T	GF	GA	GD	Pts	PPG	Qualification
1	El Farolito (Q)	12	12	0	0	41	3	+38	36	3.00	Golden Gate Conference playoffs
2	Cruziers FC (Q)	12	7	5	0	34	32	+2	21	1.75	Golden Gate Conference playoffs
3	California Odyssey SC (Q)	12	6	5	1	22	24	−2	19	1.58	Golden Gate Conference playoffs
4	Sacramento Gold (Q)	12	6	6	0	25	19	+6	18	1.50	Golden Gate Conference playoffs
5	Oakland Stompers	12	5	6	1	22	28	−6	16	1.33	
6	San Leandro United FC	12	2	7	3	19	35	−16	9	0.75	
7	Real San Jose	12	1	10	1	10	32	−22	4	0.33	

Updated to match(es) played on July 4, 2025. Source: NPSL
Rules for classification: 1) points; 2) head-to-head; 3) goal differential in head-to-head results; 4) wins; 5) total goal differential; 6) fewest losses; 7) coin toss. If three or more teams are tied on points, a mini-table involving only the tied teams is used, and teams are ranked in the mini-table on points. If two teams are tied on points in the mini-table, the two-team rules for classification apply. If three or more teams are tied on points in the mini-table, they are ranked based on 1) wins in conference competition; 2) total goal differential in conference competition; 3) fewest losses in conference competition; 4) coin toss.
(Q) Qualified for the phase indicated

=== Midwest Region ===
==== Central States Conference ====
Pos	Team	Pld	W	L	T	GF	GA	GD	Pts	PPG	Qualification
1	Michigan Rangers FC (Q)	10	8	2	0	34	12	+22	24	2.40	Gateway Conference playoffs
2	FC Milwaukee Torrent (Q)	10	8	2	0	32	14	+18	24	2.40	Gateway Conference playoffs
3	FC Pride (Q)	10	6	3	1	29	12	+17	19	1.90	Gateway Conference playoffs
4	Gio's Lions SC Chicago (Q)	10	5	4	1	21	19	+2	16	1.60	Gateway Conference playoffs
5	Wisconsin Conquerors FC	10	2	8	0	6	36	−30	6	0.60	
6	Southern Indiana Guardians FC	10	0	10	0	8	37	−29	0	0.00	

Updated to match(es) played on July 5, 2025. Source: NPSL
Rules for classification: 1) points; 2) head-to-head; 3) goal differential in head-to-head results; 4) wins; 5) total goal differential; 6) fewest losses; 7) coin toss. If three or more teams are tied on points, a mini-table involving only the tied teams is used, and teams are ranked in the mini-table on points. If two teams are tied on points in the mini-table, the two-team rules for classification apply. If three or more teams are tied on points in the mini-table, they are ranked based on 1) wins in conference competition; 2) total goal differential in conference competition; 3) fewest losses in conference competition; 4) coin toss.
(Q) Qualified for the phase indicated

==== Great Lakes Conference ====
Pos	Team	Pld	W	L	T	GF	GA	GD	Pts	PPG	Qualification
1	Flower City Union (Q)	10	8	1	1	31	8	+23	25	2.50	Great Lakes Conference Semifinal
2	Ambassadors FC Ohio (Q)	10	7	2	1	28	11	+17	22	2.20	Great Lakes Conference Semifinal
3	Rochester NY FC Academy (Q)	10	7	3	0	22	9	+13	21	2.10	Great Lakes Conference Semifinal
4	Erie Commodores (Q)	10	6	4	0	18	13	+5	18	1.80	Great Lakes Conference Semifinal
5	Cleveland SC	10	5	3	2	20	18	+2	17	1.70	
6	Buffalo Stallions	10	3	7	0	10	23	−13	9	0.90	
7	Niagara 1812	10	1	8	1	5	27	−22	4	0.40	
8	Syracuse FC	10	0	9	1	3	28	−25	1	0.10	

Updated to match(es) played on July 5, 2025. Source: NPSL
Rules for classification: 1) points; 2) head-to-head; 3) goal differential in head-to-head results; 4) wins; 5) total goal differential; 6) fewest losses; 7) coin toss. If three or more teams are tied on points, a mini-table involving only the tied teams is used, and teams are ranked in the mini-table on points. If two teams are tied on points in the mini-table, the two-team rules for classification apply. If three or more teams are tied on points in the mini-table, they are ranked based on 1) wins in conference competition; 2) total goal differential in conference competition; 3) fewest losses in conference competition; 4) coin toss.
(Q) Qualified for the phase indicated

==== North Conference ====
Pos	Team	Pld	W	L	T	GF	GA	GD	Pts	PPG	Qualification
1	Duluth FC (Q)	10	7	1	2	17	8	+9	23	2.30	North Conference playoffs
2	Siouxland United FC (Q)	10	6	4	0	26	13	+13	18	1.80	North Conference playoffs
3	Sioux Falls Thunder FC (Q)	10	4	5	1	15	22	−7	13	1.30	North Conference playoffs
4	Joy AC (Q)	10	4	5	1	20	21	−1	13	1.30	North Conference playoffs
5	Iowa Demon Hawks	10	4	5	1	14	20	−6	13	1.30	
6	Minnesota Blizzard FC	10	2	7	1	10	18	−8	7	0.70	

Updated to match(es) played on July 5, 2025. Source: NPSL
Rules for classification: 1) points; 2) head-to-head; 3) goal differential in head-to-head results; 4) wins; 5) total goal differential; 6) fewest losses; 7) coin toss. If three or more teams are tied on points, a mini-table involving only the tied teams is used, and teams are ranked in the mini-table on points. If two teams are tied on points in the mini-table, the two-team rules for classification apply. If three or more teams are tied on points in the mini-table, they are ranked based on 1) wins in conference competition; 2) total goal differential in conference competition; 3) fewest losses in conference competition; 4) coin toss.
(Q) Qualified for the phase indicated

=== South Region ===
==== Gulf Coast Sunshine Conference ====
Pos	Team	Pld	W	L	T	GF	GA	GD	Pts	PPG	Qualification
1	Jacksonville Armada U-23 (Q)	10	8	1	1	35	9	+26	25	2.50	Gulf Coast Conference playoffs
2	Naples United FC (Q)	10	7	1	2	35	9	+26	23	2.30	Gulf Coast Conference playoffs
3	New Orleans Jesters (Q)	6	3	2	1	10	10	0	10	1.67	Gulf Coast Conference playoffs
4	Club de Lyon FC (Q)	10	5	4	1	31	16	+15	16	1.60	Gulf Coast Conference playoffs
5	FC Florida	10	3	5	2	18	21	−3	11	1.10	
6	Miami Dutch Lions FC	10	2	5	3	13	29	−16	9	0.90	
7	PSC FC Florida	4	1	3	0	7	15	−8	3	0.75	
8	Global Soccer Pathways	10	0	8	2	10	50	−40	2	0.20	

Updated to match(es) played on July 5, 2025. Source: NPSL
(Q) Qualified for the phase indicated

==== Lone Star Conference ====
Pos	Team	Pld	W	L	T	GF	GA	GD	Pts	PPG	Qualification
1	West Texas FC (Q)	10	7	2	1	29	15	+14	22	2.20	Lone Star Conference playoffs
2	Lubbock Matadors SC (Q)	10	7	2	1	28	9	+19	22	2.20	Lone Star Conference playoffs
3	Oklahoma United FC (Q)	10	6	2	2	30	17	+13	20	2.00	Lone Star Conference playoffs
4	Fort Worth Vaqueros FC (Q)	10	5	5	0	20	21	−1	15	1.50	Lone Star Conference playoffs
5	Arkansas Wolves FC	10	3	7	0	11	23	−12	9	0.90	
6	FC Brownsville	10	3	5	2	21	20	+1	11	1.10	
7	CF10 Houston FC	10	1	9	0	7	41	−34	3	0.30	

Updated to match(es) played on July 5, 2025. Source: NPSL
Rules for classification: 1) points; 2) head-to-head; 3) goal differential in head-to-head results; 4) wins; 5) total goal differential; 6) fewest losses; 7) coin toss. If three or more teams are tied on points, a mini-table involving only the tied teams is used, and teams are ranked in the mini-table on points. If two teams are tied on points in the mini-table, the two-team rules for classification apply. If three or more teams are tied on points in the mini-table, they are ranked based on 1) wins in conference competition; 2) total goal differential in conference competition; 3) fewest losses in conference competition; 4) coin toss.
(Q) Qualified for the phase indicated

|notes=FC Brownsville deducted 4 points for failure to meet financial obligation to the league

==== Southeast Conference ====
Pos	Team	Pld	W	L	T	GF	GA	GD	Pts	PPG	Qualification
1	Hickory FC (Q)	10	9	0	1	31	7	+24	28	2.80	Southeast Conference playoffs
2	Appalachian FC (Q)	10	7	3	0	25	11	+14	21	2.10	Southeast Conference playoffs
3	Charlottetowne Hops FC (Q)	10	5	4	1	25	20	+5	16	1.60	Southeast Conference playoffs
4	Port City FC (Q)	10	5	4	1	20	19	+1	16	1.60	Southeast Conference playoffs
5	Greenville United	10	3	4	3	16	16	0	12	1.20	
6	Bristol Rhythm AFC	10	3	5	2	18	23	−5	11	1.10	
7	865 Alliance	10	2	6	2	10	24	−14	8	0.80	
8	Burlington United FC	10	0	8	2	7	32	−25	2	0.20	

Updated to match(es) played on July 5, 2025. Source: NPSL
Rules for classification: 1) points; 2) head-to-head; 3) goal differential in head-to-head results; 4) wins; 5) total goal differential; 6) fewest losses; 7) coin toss. If three or more teams are tied on points, a mini-table involving only the tied teams is used, and teams are ranked in the mini-table on points. If two teams are tied on points in the mini-table, the two-team rules for classification apply. If three or more teams are tied on points in the mini-table, they are ranked based on 1) wins in conference competition; 2) total goal differential in conference competition; 3) fewest losses in conference competition; 4) coin toss.
(Q) Qualified for the phase indicated

=== East Region ===
==== Keystone East Conference ====
Pos	Team	Pld	W	L	T	GF	GA	GD	Pts	PPG	Qualification
1	New Jersey United AC (Q)	10	8	1	1	24	11	+13	25	2.50	Keystone East Conference playoffs
2	FC Motown (Q)	10	6	2	2	24	11	+13	20	2.00	Keystone East Conference playoffs
3	Jackson Lions FC (Q)	10	5	3	2	28	16	+12	17	1.70	Keystone East Conference playoffs
4	Player's Development Academy (Q)	10	3	6	1	15	28	−13	10	1.00	Keystone East Conference playoffs
5	Philadelphia Union Development Squad	10	2	7	1	19	25	−6	7	0.70	
6	West Chester Predators	10	2	7	1	15	34	−19	7	0.70	

Updated to match(es) played on July 5, 2025. Source: NPSL
Rules for classification: 1) points; 2) head-to-head; 3) goal differential in head-to-head results; 4) wins; 5) total goal differential; 6) fewest losses; 7) coin toss. If three or more teams are tied on points, a mini-table involving only the tied teams is used, and teams are ranked in the mini-table on points. If two teams are tied on points in the mini-table, the two-team rules for classification apply. If three or more teams are tied on points in the mini-table, they are ranked based on 1) wins in conference competition; 2) total goal differential in conference competition; 3) fewest losses in conference competition; 4) coin toss.
(Q) Qualified for the phase indicated

==== Keystone West Conference ====
Pos	Team	Pld	W	L	T	GF	GA	GD	Pts	PPG	Qualification
1	West Chester United SC (Q)	10	8	1	1	38	9	+29	25	2.50	Keystone West Conference playoffs
2	Philadelphia Ukrainians Nationals SC (Q)	10	6	4	0	33	18	+15	18	1.80	Keystone West Conference playoffs
3	Pennsylvania Classics AC (Q)	10	5	2	3	24	12	+12	18	1.80	Keystone West Conference playoffs
4	Electric City Shock SC (Q)	10	3	5	2	16	18	−2	11	1.10	Keystone West Conference playoffs
5	Hershey FC	10	0	10	0	4	58	−54	0	0.00	

Updated to match(es) played on July 5, 2025. Source: NPSL
Rules for classification: 1) points; 2) head-to-head; 3) goal differential in head-to-head results; 4) wins; 5) total goal differential; 6) fewest losses; 7) coin toss. If three or more teams are tied on points, a mini-table involving only the tied teams is used, and teams are ranked in the mini-table on points. If two teams are tied on points in the mini-table, the two-team rules for classification apply. If three or more teams are tied on points in the mini-table, they are ranked based on 1) wins in conference competition; 2) total goal differential in conference competition; 3) fewest losses in conference competition; 4) coin toss.
(Q) Qualified for the phase indicated

==== Mid-Atlantic Conference ====
Pos	Team	Pld	W	L	T	GF	GA	GD	Pts	PPG	Qualification
1	Virginia Dream FC (Q)	10	9	0	1	57	7	+50	28	2.80	Mid-Atlantic Conference playoffs
2	Ristozi FC (Q)	10	8	2	0	39	6	+33	24	2.40	Mid-Atlantic Conference playoffs
3	Alexandria Reds (Q)	10	5	1	4	27	7	+20	19	1.90	Mid-Atlantic Conference playoffs
4	Grove United (Q)	10	5	3	2	26	19	+7	17	1.70	Mid-Atlantic Conference playoffs
5	District Elite FC	10	4	5	1	23	26	−3	13	1.30	
6	DMV Elite FC	10	3	5	2	16	19	−3	11	1.10	
7	Virginia Beach City FC	10	3	6	1	16	28	−12	10	1.00	
8	FC Frederick	10	2	7	1	15	38	−23	7	0.70	
9	Alexandria Rough Diamonds	10	0	10	0	3	72	−69	0	0.00	

Updated to match(es) played on July 5, 2025. Source: NPSL
Rules for classification: 1) points; 2) head-to-head; 3) goal differential in head-to-head results; 4) wins; 5) total goal differential; 6) fewest losses; 7) coin toss. If three or more teams are tied on points, a mini-table involving only the tied teams is used, and teams are ranked in the mini-table on points. If two teams are tied on points in the mini-table, the two-team rules for classification apply. If three or more teams are tied on points in the mini-table, they are ranked based on 1) wins in conference competition; 2) total goal differential in conference competition; 3) fewest losses in conference competition; 4) coin toss.
(Q) Qualified for the phase indicated

==== North Atlantic Conference ====
Pos	Team	Pld	W	L	T	GF	GA	GD	Pts	PPG	Qualification
1	Hartford City FC (Q)	10	6	2	2	21	11	+10	20	2.00	North Atlantic Conference Semifinal
2	New Haven United FC (Q)	10	4	4	2	20	19	+1	14	1.40	North Atlantic Conference Semifinal
3	New York Shockers (Q)	10	2	2	6	10	13	−3	12	1.20	North Atlantic Conference Semifinal
4	Osner's FC (Q)	10	3	5	2	15	21	−6	11	1.10	North Atlantic Conference Semifinal
5	American Soccer Club New York	10	2	4	4	18	20	−2	10	1.00	

Updated to match(es) played on July 5, 2025. Source: NPSL
Rules for classification: 1) points; 2) head-to-head; 3) goal differential in head-to-head results; 4) wins; 5) total goal differential; 6) fewest losses; 7) coin toss. If three or more teams are tied on points, a mini-table involving only the tied teams is used, and teams are ranked in the mini-table on points. If two teams are tied on points in the mini-table, the two-team rules for classification apply. If three or more teams are tied on points in the mini-table, they are ranked based on 1) wins in conference competition; 2) total goal differential in conference competition; 3) fewest losses in conference competition; 4) coin toss.
(Q) Qualified for the phase indicated

== Playoffs ==
Note: Games are hosted by the highest seed unless noted otherwise

=== West Region Conference playoffs ===
==== Golden Gate Conference playoffs ====
Semifinal; July 12
**1**	**El Farolito**	**2**
4	Sacramento Gold	1
**2**	**Cruziers FC**	**2**
3	California Odyssey SC	1

Final; July 19
**1**	**El Farolito**	**4**
2	Cruziers FC	1

Bold = winner
* = after extra time, ( ) = penalty shootout score, FF = forfeit

July 12 Conference Semifinals	**El Farolito**	**2–1**	Sacramento Gold	San Francisco, California
6:00 PM CDT	Kreye 30'; Jo. Murillo (yellow card) 50'; Benson 65'; Arias (yellow card) 70'; Yabur (yellow card) 85'		Viera (yellow card) 40'; JA. Murillo (yellow card) 44'; Cruz-Perez 55'; Mena (yellow card) 57'	Stadium: Kezar Stadium

July 12 Conference Semifinals	**Cruziers FC**	**2–1**	California Odyssey SC	Modesto, California
9:00 PM CDT	Mayorca 45+2'; Medina 47' (yellow card) 90+2'; Avila (yellow card) 87'		Singh (yellow card) 6'; Silva (yellow card) 24'; Rico 89'	Stadium: Roy Blakeley Field

July 19 Conference Final	**El Farolito**	**4–1**	Cruziers FC	San Francisco, California
6:30 PM PDT	Benson 41', 82'; Sacre (yellow card) 49'; 67' (o.g.); Kreye 88'		Medina 16'; Cortez (yellow card) 24'; Ramos (yellow card) 47'; Angeles (yellow card) 66' (yellow-red card) 75'; Flores (yellow card) 84'	Stadium: Kezar Stadium

=== Midwest Region Conference playoffs ===
==== Central States Conference playoffs ====
Semifinals; July 9
**1**	**Michigan Rangers FC**	**2**
4	Gio's Lions SC Chicago	0
2	FC Milwaukee Torrent	0
**3**	**FC Pride**	**1**

Finals; July 12
**1**	**Michigan Rangers FC**	**2**
3	FC Pride	1

Bold = winner
* = after extra time, ( ) = penalty shootout score, FF = forfeit

July 9 Conference Semifinal	**Michigan Rangers FC**	**2–0**	Gio's Lions SC Chicago	Caledonia, Michigan
6:00 PM CDT	Kervick 33'; Baumann (yellow card) 45'; Ambeha 75' (yellow card) 85'		Velazquez (yellow card) 45+4' (yellow-red card) 79'; Dutra (yellow card) 59'; Abdulwahab (red card) 83'; Agbokou (red card) 85'; Reyes (yellow card)	Stadium: Davenport Univ Farmers Athletic Insurance Complex

July 9 Conference Semifinal	FC Milwaukee Torrent	**0–1**	**FC Pride**	Wauwatosa, Wisconsin
7:00 PM CDT	Chartrand (yellow card) 20'; Garcia (yellow card) 50'; Weber (yellow card)		Eldridge (yellow card) 41' (goal) 45'; Allen (yellow card) 88'; Gilbert (yellow card)	Stadium: Hart Park

July 12 Conference Final	**Michigan Rangers FC**	**2–1**	FC Pride	Caledonia, Michigan
6:00 PM CDT	Mendez 14'; Smith 72'; Arellano (yellow card) 90+4'		Oneacre 45'; Bell (yellow card) 82'; Havice (yellow card) 88'	Stadium: Davenport Univ Farmers Athletic Insurance Complex

==== Great Lakes Conference playoffs ====
Semifinal; July 9
**1**	**Flower City Union**	**3**
4	Erie Commodores	1
**2**	**Ambassadors FC Ohio**	**2**
3	Rochester NY FC Academy	1

Final; July 12
**1**	**Flower City Union**	**3**
2	Ambassadors FC Ohio	0

Bold = winner
* = after extra time, ( ) = penalty shootout score, FF = forfeit

July 9 Conference Semifinal	**Flower City Union**	**3–1** (a.e.t.)	Erie Commodores	North Chili, New York
6:00 PM CDT	de Almeida 14', 97' (pen.); Fitzgerald (yellow card) 43'; Rippe (yellow card) 65'; Sevene (yellow card) 82'; Egan (yellow card) 105'; Alexandre 110'		Wurstner (yellow card) 28' (yellow-red card) 119'; Ganser (yellow card) 42'; Buckley 58' (pen.) (yellow card) 89'; O’Brien (yellow card) 95'; Lovett (yellow card) 105+2'; O. Petersen (yellow card) 119'; C. Petersen (yellow card) 68' (yellow-red card) 119'	Stadium: Roberts Wesleyan University-Turf Field

July 9 Conference Semifinal	**Ambassadors FC Ohio**	**2–1**	Rochester NY FC Academy	Canton, Ohio
6:00 PM CDT	Spratt (yellow card) 34'; O'Callaghan (yellow card) 45'; Smith-Skladany 54'; Depperschmidt (yellow card) 68'; Mihalek (yellow card) 86'; Trujillo 90+5'		Catanzarite (yellow card) 54'; Railey (yellow card) 58'; Drayer (yellow card) 63'; McDermott (yellow card) 90+4'	Stadium: Malone University

July 12 Conference Final	**Flower City Union**	**3–0**	Ambassadors FC Ohio	Rochester, New York
4:00 PM CDT	Rice 14', 69'; Palmer 22'; Nelson (yellow card) 29'		Spratt (yellow card) 11'	Stadium: Rochester Community Sports Complex Stadium

==== North Conference playoffs ====
Semifinals; July 9
1	Duluth FC	2
**4**	**Joy AC**	**3**
**2**	**Siouxland United FC**	**2**
3	Sioux Falls Thunder FC	0

Final; July 12
**2**	**Siouxland United FC**	**3**
4	Joy AC	0

Bold = winner
* = after extra time, ( ) = penalty shootout score, FF = forfeit

July 9 Conference Semifinals	**Siouxland United FC**	**2–0**	Sioux Falls Thunder FC	Sioux City, Iowa
6:00 PM CDT	Rocha 11' (yellow card) 49'; Portorreal 50'			Stadium: Bishop Heelan Memorial Field

July 9 Conference Semifinals	Duluth FC	**2–3**	**Joy AC**	Superior, Wisconsin
7:00 PM CDT	Garcia 1'; Pritchard 5'		Price 21'; Alvarado 52'; Tierney 67'; Folstad (yellow card) 87'; Caputo (yellow card) 90'	Stadium: SCCU Stadium at UW - Superior

July 12 Conference Final	**Siouxland United FC**	**3–0**	Joy AC	Sioux City, Iowa
7:00 PM CDT	Rocha 48'; Takayama 68'; Faulkner (yellow card) 79'; Tientcheu 85' (yellow card) 90'; Eguchi (yellow card) 90+2'		Alvarado (yellow card) 63'; Caputo (yellow card) 77'; Mohrlok (yellow card) 90'	Stadium: Bishop Heelan Memorial Field

=== South Region Conference playoffs ===
==== Gulf Coast Conference playoffs ====
Semifinals; July 9
**1**	**Jacksonville Armada U-23**	**2**
2	New Orleans Jesters	1
**2**	**Naples United FC**	**3**
4	Club de Lyon FC	1

Final; July 12
**1**	**Jacksonville Armada U-23**	**2***
2	Naples United FC	0

Bold = winner
* = after extra time, ( ) = penalty shootout score, FF = forfeit

July 9 Conference Semifinals	**Jacksonville Armada U-23**	**2–1**	New Orleans Jesters	Jacksonville, Florida
6:00 PM CDT	M. Zettl 27' (yellow card) 45+1'; S. Zettl (yellow card) 58'; Matton 63'; Hrvojevic (yellow card) 90+4'		Gomez (yellow card) 27'; Gunera (yellow card) 27' (goal) 42' (pen.); Izaias (yellow card) 54'; Pinto (yellow card) 90+2'	Stadium: Nathaniel Glover Stadium

July 9 Conference Semifinals	**Naples United FC**	**3–1**	Club de Lyon FC	Naples, Florida
6:00 PM CDT	Marisi 17', 90+4' (pen.); Guerra (yellow card) 49'; Ramos 51'; Vaca (yellow card) 55'; Ruth (yellow card) 60'; Spaulding (yellow card) 77'		Reina (yellow card) 4' (yellow-red card) 80'; Ortiz (yellow card) 31'; Pourrain (yellow card) 44'; Pineyro (red card) 67'; Parra (yellow card) 67' (goal) 70'	Stadium: Community School of Naples

July 12 Conference Final	**Jacksonville Armada U-23**	**2–0** (a.e.t.)	Naples United FC	Jacksonville, Florida
6:00 PM CDT	Marques (yellow card) 41'; Zettl (yellow card) 45+3'; Csato 110' (yellow card) 110'; Scargle (yellow card) 113'; Msabaha 120+3'; Matton (yellow card) 120+3'		L. Furione (yellow card) 16'; Vaca (yellow card) 52'; Marisi (yellow card) 69' (yellow-red card) 98'; Luengo (yellow card) 86' (yellow-red card) 90+3'; M. Furione (yellow card) 87' (yellow-red card) 116'; Guerra (yellow card) 106'; Spaulding (yellow card) 120'	Stadium: Nathaniel Glover Stadium

==== Lone Star Conference playoffs ====
Semifinals; July 9
**1**	**West Texas FC**	**3**
4	Fort Worth Vaqueros FC	0
**2**	**Lubbock Matadors**	**5**
3	Oklahoma United FC	2

Final; July 12
1	West Texas FC	2
**2**	**Lubbock Matadors**	**4***

Bold = winner
* = after extra time, ( ) = penalty shootout score, FF = forfeit

July 9 Conference Semifinals	**West Texas FC**	**3–0**	Fort Worth Vaqueros FC	Midland, Texas
7:30 PM CDT	Arous 17'; Marques 33', 45+2'; Mrvcic (yellow card) 38'; Nnuro-Frimpong (yellow card) 78'		Conway (yellow card) 52'; Barbee (yellow card) 57'; Stephens (yellow card) 84'	Stadium: Astound Broadband Stadium

July 9 Conference Semifinals	**Lubbock Matadors**	**5–2**	Oklahoma United FC	Lubbock, Texas
7:30 PM CDT	Torre 5', 12' (yellow card) 27'; Canchila 6' (yellow card) 38'; Thomas 7'; Pascoe (yellow card) 50'; Schlaefli (yellow card) 60'; Butterworth 75'; Avila (yellow card) 85'		Tremblez 47'; Diallo 64'	Stadium: Lowrey Field at Plains Capital Park

July 12 Conference Final	West Texas FC	**2–4** (a.e.t.)	**Lubbock Matadors**	Midland, Texas
7:30 PM CDT	Duffau (yellow card) 52' (yellow-red card) 117'; Marques 60'; Freire 69'; Mrvcic (yellow card) 79'		Cardona (yellow card) 10'; Torre 23' (yellow card) 52'; Canchila (yellow card) 56'; Naidoo (yellow card) 82'; Aboohamidi (yellow card) 89' (goal) 119'; Butterworth 90+6', 104'	Stadium: Astound Broadband Stadium

==== Southeast Conference playoffs ====
Semifinals; July 9
1	**Hickory FC**
4	Port City FC	FF
**2**	**Appalachian FC**	**6**
3	Charlottetowne Hops FC	1

Final; July 12
**1**	**Hickory FC**	**1***
2	Appalachian FC	0

Bold = winner
* = after extra time, ( ) = penalty shootout score, FF = forfeit

July 9 Conference Semifinals	**Appalachian FC**	**6–1**	Charlottetowne Hops FC	Boone, North Carolina
6:30 PM CDT	Diakos 1'; Oughterson 30'; Rajkovic (yellow card) 37'; Applewhaite 57'; Frost 65', 69' (pen.); Taylor (yellow card) 80'; Purewal 82'; Güell (red card) 87'; Gilley (yellow card) 90+3'		Carol (yellow card) 42'; Schwartz (yellow card) 60'; Martinovic (yellow card) 68'; Faye 88' (pen.)	Stadium: Ted Mackorell Soccer Complex

July 10 Conference Semifinals	**Hickory FC**	**FF**	Port City FC	Hickory, North Carolina
11:00 AM CDT				Stadium: Moretz Stadium; Attendance: +

July 12 Conference Final	**Hickory FC**	**1–0** (a.e.t.)	Appalachian FC	Hickory, North Carolina
6:00 PM CDT	Souza (yellow card) 50'; Correa (yellow card) 51'; Pino Jara (yellow card) 90'; Blondel (yellow card) 90+4'; Pollacchi 119'		Applewhaite (yellow card) 29'; Rajkovic (yellow card) 86'; Purewal (yellow card) 97'; Walker (yellow card) 101'	Stadium: Moretz Stadium; Attendance: 5,758

=== East Region Conference playoffs ===
==== Keystone East Conference playoffs ====
Semifinals; July 10
**1**	**New Jersey United AC**	**2**
4	Player's Development Academy	0
2	FC Motown	0
**3**	**Jackson Lions FC**	**2**

Final; July 13
1	New Jersey United AC	0
**3**	**Jackson Lions FC**	**1**

Bold = winner
* = after extra time, ( ) = penalty shootout score, FF = forfeit

July 9 Conference Semifinals	**New Jersey United AC**	**2–0**	Player's Development Academy	New Brunswick, New Jersey
6:00 PM CDT	Moya 38'; 45+2'; Barboto (yellow card) 75'		Olson-Warwick (yellow card) 10'; Valeri (yellow card) 18'; Dlabal (yellow card) 74'; Finkielstein (yellow card) 85'	Stadium: Memorial Stadium

July 9 Conference Semifinals	FC Motown	**0–2**	**Jackson Lions FC**	Montclair, New Jersey
6:00 PM CDT	Hagen (yellow card) 40'; Perez (yellow card) 48'; Bednarsky (yellow card) 60'; Espinosa (yellow card) 87'		10' (o.g.); Krongold (yellow card) 45+5'; De Leon (yellow card) 56'; Johnson 61'; Anderson (yellow card) 88'	Stadium: MSU Soccer Park at Pittser Field

July 12 Conference Final	New Jersey United AC	**0–1**	**Jackson Lions FC**	New Brunswick, New Jersey
6:00 PM CDT	Cadigan (yellow card) 25'; Petreski (yellow card) 83'; McKinney (yellow card) 90+1'		Johnson (yellow card) 27'; Golden (yellow card) 31'; Quist 45+1'; Diaz (yellow card) 67'	Stadium: Memorial Stadium

==== Keystone West Conference playoffs ====
Semifinals; July 9
**1**	**West Chester United SC**	**1**
4	Electric City Shock SC	0
**2**	**Philadelphia Ukrainians Nationals SC**	**2**
3	Pennsylvania Classics AC	1

Final; July 12
**1**	**West Chester United SC**	**2**
2	Philadelphia Ukrainians Nationals SC	1

July 9 Conference Semifinals	**Philadelphia Ukrainians Nationals SC**	**2–1**	Pennsylvania Classics AC	North Wales, Pennsylvania
6:00 PM CDT	LaMaina (yellow card) 8'; Zama 73'; 79' (o.g.); Combs (yellow card) 90+2'		McEvoy (yellow card) 37'; Cardona 65'	Stadium: Ukrainian American Sport Center

July 9 Conference Semifinals	**West Chester United SC**	**1–0**	Electric City Shock SC	Wayne, Pennsylvania
6:30 PM CDT	Elkahloun 43'; Ricks (yellow card) 73'; Wilson (yellow card) 73' (yellow-red card) 82'		Dwamena (yellow card) 67'; Coulibaly (yellow card) 84'	Stadium: Kildares Field

July 12 Conference Final	**West Chester United SC**	**2–1**	Philadelphia Ukrainians Nationals SC	Wayne, Pennsylvania
6:00 PM CDT	Slack 9'; Bhogal (yellow card) 45+2'; Beckwith (yellow card) 53'; Roby 59'; Mouhou (yellow card) 90+2'; Kneis (yellow card) 90+6'		Zama 45+2' (pen.); Murray (yellow card) 86'	Stadium: Kildares Field

==== Mid-Atlantic Conference playoffs ====
Semifinals; July 9
**1**	**Virginia Dream FC**	**6**
4	Grove United	3
**2**	**Ristozi FC**	**2**
3	Alexandria Reds	1

Final; July 12
1	Virginia Dream FC	1
**2**	**Ristozi FC**	**2***

Bold = winner
* = after extra time, ( ) = penalty shootout score, FF = forfeit

July 8 Conference Semifinals	**Ristozi FC**	**2–1**	Alexandria Reds	Owings Mills, Maryland
6:00 PM CDT	Katsuma 8' (yellow card) 25'; Petty 15' (pen.); Nogami (yellow card) 62'; Crow (yellow card) 75'; Langon (yellow card) 90+1'		Aikens (yellow card) 15'; Murphy (yellow card) 22'; Vandehei (yellow card) 59'; Graser (yellow card) 84'; Rubio-Amaya 90+1'	Stadium: Mustang Stadium

July 9 Conference Semifinals	**Virginia Dream FC**	**6–3** (a.e.t.)	**Grove United**	Falls Church, Virginia
4:00 PM CDT	Wachsman (yellow card) 50'; Akinkoye 62'; Campbell (yellow card) 82'; Beil 83', 102'; Diarra 105'; Conde 115' (yellow card) 115'; Slavov 120+2'		29' (o.g.); Broussard 31'; Chidzvondo (yellow card) 33'; Ihnat (yellow card) 55'; Javier (yellow card) 81'; Lagos (yellow card) 87'; Martins (yellow card) 97'; Senior 115' (pen.); Enamorado (yellow card) 120+3'	Stadium: Meridian High School Stadium

July 12 Conference Final	Virginia Dream FC	**1–2** (a.e.t.)	**Ristozi FC**	Falls Church, Virginia
6:00 PM CDT	Filerman (yellow card) 34'; Diarra 40'; O'Neill (yellow card) 51'; Rodriguez (yellow card) 87'; Shepard-Lewis (yellow card) 115'		Katsuma 37'; Ono 93'; Braga (yellow card) 106'	Stadium: Meridian High School Stadium

==== North Atlantic Conference playoffs ====
Semifinal; July 9
**1**	**Hartford City FC**	**1 (5)**
4	Osner's FC	1 (3)
**2**	**New Haven United FC**	**2**
3	New York Shockers	1

Final; July 12
1	Hartford City FC	0
**2**	**New Haven United FC**	**1**

Bold = winner
* = after extra time, ( ) = penalty shootout score, FF = forfeit

July 9 Conference Semifinals	**New Haven United FC**	**2–1**	New York Shockers	New Haven, Connecticut
6:00 PM CDT	Casas (yellow card) 36'; Aidoo (yellow card) 56'; Dobruna 68'; Meira 78' (yellow card) 78'; Alessio (yellow card) 90+2'; Morgan (yellow card) 90+3'		LaVallee (yellow card) 16'; Okine (yellow card) 43'; DaCosta (yellow card) 45+1'; Ehlin 50'	Stadium: Reese Stadium

July 9 Conference Semifinals	**Hartford City FC**	**1–1** (a.e.t.) (**5–3** p)	Osner's FC	Farmington, Connecticut
6:00 PM CDT	Becher 75' (pen.); Azambuja (yellow card) 96'		Viloria (yellow card) 22'; Chery 58'; Guzman (yellow card) 61'; Martinez (red card) 73'; Martinez (yellow card) 89'; Vasquez (yellow card); Herrera (yellow card)	Stadium: Farmington Sports Arena
	**Penalties**
	Humienny (penalty scored); Rau (penalty scored); Becher (penalty scored); Grant (penalty scored); Pollard (penalty scored)		(penalty scored) Chery; (penalty scored) Martinez; (penalty scored) Guzman

July 12 Conference Final	Hartford City FC	**0–1**	**New Haven United FC**	Hartford, Connecticut
3:00 PM CDT	Harris (yellow card) 29'; Mounts (yellow card) 90'		Diliberti 23' (o.g.); Rosén (yellow card) 29'; Armas (yellow card) 57'; Morgan (yellow card) 76'; Hess (yellow card) 90'; Aidoo (yellow card) 87' (yellow-red card) 90'	Stadium: Trinity Health Stadium

=== Regional and National playoffs ===
Regional semifinals July 16
**1**	**West Chester United SC**	**4**
4	New Haven United FC	0
**2**	**Ristozi FC**	**3**
3	Jackson Lions FC	0
**South Region**
2	Jacksonville Armada U-23	0
**3**	**Lubbock Matadors**	**1**
**1**	**El Farolito**	**2**
4	Sacramento Gold	1
**West Region**
**2**	**Cruziers FC**	**2**
3	California Odyssey SC	1
**Midwest Region**
**2**	**Michigan Rangers FC**	**3**
3	Siouxland United FC	2

Regional Finals; July 19
1	West Chester United SC	1
**2**	**Ristozi FC**	**2**
**1**	**Hickory FC**	**1**
3	Lubbock Matadors	0
**1**	**El Farolito**	**4**
2	Cruziers FC	1
1	Flower City Union	0
**2**	**Michigan Rangers FC**	**3**

National semifinals (Note: The remaining four teams are reseeded for the national semifinals.); July 26
Ristozi FC	2
**Hickory FC**	**3**
**El Farolito**	**2**
Michigan Rangers FC	0

National Final; August 2
**Hickory FC**	**3**
El Farolito	2

Bold = winner
* = after extra time, ( ) = penalty shootout score, FF = forfeit

==== Regional Semifinals ====
July 12 West Region Semifinal	**El Farolito**	**2–1**	Sacramento Gold	San Francisco, California
6:00 PM CDT	Kreye 30'; Jo. Murillo (yellow card) 50'; Benson 65'; Arias (yellow card) 70'; Yabur (yellow card) 85'		Viera (yellow card) 40'; JA. Murillo (yellow card) 44'; Cruz-Perez 55'; Mena (yellow card) 57'	Stadium: Kezar Stadium

July 12 West Region Semifinal	**Cruziers FC**	**2–1**	California Odyssey SC	Modesto, California
9:00 PM CDT	Mayorca 45+2'; Medina 47' (yellow card) 90+2'; Avila (yellow card) 87'		Singh (yellow card) 6'; Silva (yellow card) 24'; Rico 89'	Stadium: Roy Blakeley Field

July 16 Midwest Region Semifinal	**Michigan Rangers FC**	**3–2**	Siouxland United FC	Caledonia, Michigan
6:00 PM CDT	Keane (yellow card) 11'; Mendez 43', 77'; Ifaturoti 74' (yellow card) 88'; Postlewait (yellow card) 76'; Baigrie (yellow card) 90+5'		Takayama 55'; Davidson 61'	Stadium: Davenport Univ Farmers Athletic Insurance Complex

July 16 South Region Semifinal	Jacksonville Armada U-23	**0–1**	**Lubbock Matadors**	Jacksonville, Florida
6:00 PM CDT	Shanley (yellow card) 41'		Torre 20' (yellow card) 41'; Bilinac (yellow card) 50'; Koczulap (yellow card) 72'; Butterworth (yellow card) 76'	Stadium: Nathaniel Glover Stadium

July 16 East Region Semifinal	**West Chester United SC**	**4–0**	New Haven United FC	Chester, Pennsylvania
6:00 PM CDT	Mouhou 18', 57' (pen.); Whitchurch (yellow card) 31'; Perez-Gasiba 79'; Lacy 90+2'		Mohammed (yellow card) 49'; Dobruna (yellow card) 75'; Carchipulla (yellow card) 87'; Germano (yellow card) 90+2'	Stadium: Leslie C. Quick Jr. Stadium

July 17 East Region Semifinal	**Ristozi FC**	**3–0** (a.e.t.)	Jackson Lions FC	Washington D.C.
6:00 PM CDT	Lewis (yellow card) 23' (yellow-red card) 116'; Nogami (yellow card) 36'; Soriano (yellow card) 45+2'; Katsuma 98', 120'; Braga (yellow card) 105' (goal) 120+5'; Langon (yellow card) 108'		McGiff (yellow card) 75'; Kuster (yellow card) 120+2'	Stadium: Cardinal Stadium

==== Regional Finals ====
July 19 Midwest Region Final	Flower City Union	**0–3**	**Michigan Rangers FC**	Rochester, New York
6:00 PM CDT	Masucci (yellow card) 76'; Rippe (yellow card) 83'		Davis 30'; Mendez 61'; Postlewait (yellow card) 64'; Smith 70'	Stadium: Rochester Community Sports Complex Stadium

July 19 South Region Final	**Hickory FC**	**1–0**	Lubbock Matadors	Hickory, North Carolina
6:00 PM CDT	Gomez (yellow card) 39'; Gonzalez 63'; Galizzi (yellow card) 86'; Rowe (yellow card) 90+4'		Torre (yellow card) 41'; Naidoo (yellow card) 48'; Schlaefli (yellow card) 63'; Butterworth (yellow card) 78'; Kröss (yellow card) 88' (yellow-red card) 90+2'	Stadium: Moretz Stadium; Attendance: 5,000

July 19 East Region Final	West Chester United SC	**1–2**	**Ristozi FC**	Reading, Pennsylvania
6:00 PM CDT	Roby (yellow card) 89' (goal) 90+1'		Clapp 36'; Soriano (yellow card) 42'; Petty 49'; Beauman-Ansah (yellow card) 75'	Stadium: Alvernia Turf Field

July 19 West Region Final	**El Farolito**	**4–1**	Cruziers FC	San Francisco, California
8:30 PM CDT	Benson 41', 82'; Sacre (yellow card) 49'; 67' (o.g.); Kreye 88'		Medina 16'; Cortez (yellow card) 24'; Ramos (yellow card) 47'; Angeles (yellow card) 66' (yellow-red card) 75'; Flores (yellow card) 84'	Stadium: Kezar Stadium

==== National Semifinals ====
July 26	**Hickory FC**	**3–2**	Ristozi FC	Hickory, North Carolina
6:00 PM CDT	O'Mahony 28'; Letienne 41'; Pollacchi 67'		Ono 60'; Soriano (yellow card) 90+3'; Katsuma 90+9'; Beauman-Ansah (yellow card) 90+10'	Stadium: Moretz Stadium; Attendance: 6,247

July 26	Michigan Rangers FC	**0–2**	**El Farolito**	Caledonia, Michigan
6:00 PM CDT	Deppe (yellow card) 42'; Durand (yellow card) 51' (yellow-red card) 90+26'; Arellano (yellow card) 90+15'		Martinez 17' (yellow card) 90+26'; Hernandez (yellow card) 34'; Soto 90+29'	Stadium: Davenport Univ Farmers Athletic Insurance Complex

==== 2025 NPSL National Championship Game ====
August 2

El Farolito	2–3	Hickory FC
Sacre (yellow card) 15'; Hernandez (yellow card) 34' (red card) 90+7'; Benson 39'; Yabur (yellow card) 52'; Murillo (yellow card) 59'; Mosquera (yellow card) 82'; Arias (yellow card) 87'; Perez 90+5'		Letienne (yellow card) 17' (goal) 52'; Pineda 30' (yellow card) 56' (yellow-red card) 86'; Correa (yellow card) 40'; Galizzi (yellow card) 67'; Miklosi (yellow card) 68'; Pollacchi 90+3'; Rowe (yellow card) 90+5'

Kezar Stadium, San Francisco, California
Attendance: 1,000

Championship MVP: (Argentina) Lucas Hazi Pollacchi Hickory FC
