= Bristol Rhythm AFC =

- Founded: 2023; 3 years ago
- Ground: Gene Malcolm Stadium
- Capacity: 4,000
- Owner: Mountain Empire Sports
- President: Matt Smith
- Manager: Dave Neijenhuis
- League: NPSL
- 2026: 2nd, National
- Website: Website

Bristol Rhythm AFC is a United States soccer club representing the twin cities of Bristol, Tennessee and Bristol, Virginia and the wider Tri-Cities region. The club currently competes in the Southeast Conference of the National Premier Soccer League.

== Stadium ==
The team's home venue is the Gene Malcolm Stadium in Bristol, Virginia.

== History ==
It was announced in August 2023 that Bristol was granted an expansion team in the National Premier Soccer League for the 2024 season. Diane Smith would serve as principal owner under the Mountain Empire Sports umbrella. Matt Smith would serve as the club's president.

Bristol Rhythm AFC played its first-ever match on May 11, 2024, a home fixture against Appalachian FC. Barbados international Niall Reid-Stephen scored for the visitors in the 36th-minute to become the first-ever player to score against Bristol. Appalachian FC won the match 3–0. The following week, Bristol defeated Port City FC 3–1 for the first victory in team history. Joseph McMahon scored the club's opening goal of the contest to become the club's first-ever goalscorer. Stooge Mbaakanyi scored for Bristol before McMahon rounded out the team's scoring with his second goal of the match. Despite being a new team that struggled on the pitch, Bristol Rhythm had the second-highest attendance in the league that season.

For the 2026 season, Bristol Rhythm went undefeated in the regular season with a record of 9-1-0 to earn its first-ever regular season championship and its first play-off berth. The club advanced through the play-offs to reach the conference final. Bristol went on to defeat New Haven United FC 2–0 in the match to advance to the national championship. Bristol hosted the championship match against El Farolito SC at Gene Malcolm Stadium. An all-time record crowd for the NPSL final of 2,159 were in attendance at the match. Despite taking a 0–0 draw into half-time, El Farolito scored three goals in the second half to win their second national championship in three years. Despite the loss, the season was the most successful in club history, setting a single-season record for wins, in addition to its first regular season and conference championships. With the second-place finish, the club qualified directly for the 2027 U.S. Open Cup. Following the season, manager Dave Neijenhuis and Goalkeeper Noe Delmotte were named the league best in their positions while Delmotte was also named the Southeast Conference MVP.

== Current roster ==
As of October 2, 2026

Note: Flags indicate national team as defined under FIFA eligibility rules; some limited exceptions apply. Players may hold more than one non-FIFA nationality.

No.	Pos.	Nation	Player
6	DF	ESP	Albert Montragull
4	DF	USA	Clayton Butler
18	FW	USA	Constantine Barlas
23	MF	ESP	Daniel Ojeda
14	FW	USA	Elliot Edwards
0	GK	GER	Florian Quast
13	DF	USA	Grayson Cunningham
12	DF	USA	Grayson Hammond
17	FW	USA	Hugo Martinez
6	MF	USA	Israel Garcia-Perez
7	DF	AUS	Jack Neumann
1	DF	USA	Jake Kellerhals
2	DF	ENG	James Bakou
8	MF	ENG	Kai Slinn

No.	Pos.	Nation	Player
4	DF	IRL	Kirk Rahill
6	MF	ESP	Koke Gracia
9	FW	AUT	Lorenzo Klamler
4	MF	ENG	Louis Salkeld
19	MF	ENG	Lucas Schofield
21	FW	ESP	Marco Lattanzi
11	MF	RSA	Nathan Booth
1	GK	FRA	Noe Delmotte
67	FW	GHA	Patrick Enchill
0	GK	USA	Quincy Howard
—	MF	PER	Rodrigo Nina Ortiz
3	DF	USA	Taylor Vorbrich
17	FW	AND	Unai Cruz

== Record ==
=== Seasons ===
Key

Champion Runners-up 3rd Place

Season	League									Play-offs (Conference)	Play-offs (Regional)	Play-offs (National)	Coach	Notes
Season	Div.	Pos. (Conference)	Pl.	W	D	L	GF	GA	Pts.	Play-offs (Conference)	Play-offs (Regional)	Play-offs (National)	Coach	Notes
2024	NPSL	6th	10	2	0	8	10	26	6	DNQ	DNQ	DNQ	(United States) Louis Sharp	
2025	NPSL	6th	10	3	2	5	18	23	9	DNQ	DNQ	DNQ	(United States) Louis Sharp	
2026	NPSL	1st	10	9	1	0	21	6	28	First, Southeast	N/A	2nd	(Netherlands) Dave Neijenhui	

Source: NPSL

=== U.S. Open Cup ===
Year	Tournament	Round	Opponent	Result	Ref.
2027	U.S. Open Cup	First Round	TBD		
