= Siouxland United FC =

- Nickname: The Outlaws
- Founded: 2023; 3 years ago
- Ground: Bishop Heelan Memorial Field
- Capacity: 1,600
- Owner: Siouxland Pro Sports LLC
- Manager: Alex Trent
- League: NPSL
- 2026: 2nd, Northern Conference
- Website: Website

Siouxland United FC is a United States soccer club based in Sioux City, Iowa that currently competes in the National Premier Soccer League.

== Stadium ==
The team's home venue is the Bishop Heelan Memorial Field on the campus of Briar Cliff University.

== History ==
Siouxland United FC was announced as a new club in October 2023. The club's identity is an homage to the tri-sate region including Iowa, Nebraska, and South Dakota, locally referred to as "Siouxland" for the local Sioux people. The team would debut in the National Premier Soccer League for the 2024 season with former England youth international Robbie Carroll serving as its first-ever head coach.

The Outlaws debuted on May 18, 2024 away at Duluth FC. Duluth's Charlie Wood became the first player to score against the club with a 47th-minute strike in the eventual 2–1 victory for Duluth. Australian midfielder Flynn Faulkner scored Siouxland's goal in the match, the first ever scored by the club. The following week, Siouxland United played its first home match and earned its first win in a 2–1 victory over Minnesota Twin Stars. The club finished its debut season with a 6-0-6 record

Prior to the 2025 season, Alex Trent was named the team's new head coach after leading Dakota Fusion FC the previous year. The club began the season with back-to-back defeats before winning its home opener 5–0 over Joy Athletic Club. During the season, two of the team's players from the NCAA Division I Creighton Bluejays left mid-season to join USL Championship side Miami FC while another went on trial with Sporting Kansas City of Major League Soccer. After finishing second in the Northern Conference during the regular season, Siouxland advanced to the play-off final. The team defeated Joy AC 3–0 to win the conference title and advance to the Mid-West Regional play-offs. Michigan Rangers FC, Central Conference champions, defeated Siouxland 2–1 in the regional semi-final to end the team's second campaign.

Alex Trent returned as head coach for a second season in 2026. After eight matches, Siouxland United sat at the top of the Northern Conference table. With a 2–0 victory over Minnesota Blizzard FC on July 1st, the club clinched first place in the Northern Conference for its first regular-season championship. They finished the season with a 7-0-3 record, clinching home-field advantage for the conference play-offs. The club again advanced to the conference final, this time losing to Duluth FC to end the Iowan club's campaign.

== Record ==
Key

Champion Runners-up 3rd Place

Season	League									Play-offs (Conference)	Play-offs (Regional)	Coach	Notes
Season	Div.	Pos. (Conference)	Pl.	W	D	L	GF	GA	Pts.	Play-offs (Conference)	Play-offs (Regional)	Coach	Notes
2024	NPSL	5th	12	6	0	6	25	24	18	DNQ	DNQ	(England) Robbie Carroll	
2025	NPSL	2nd	10	6	0	4	26	13	18	1st, Northern	Semi-finals	(United States) Alex Trent	
2026	NPSL	1st	10	7	3	0	25	7	24	2nd, Northern	DNQ	(United States) Alex Trent	

Source: NPSL
