= Moretz =

Moretz may refer to:

- Chloë Grace Moretz (born 1997), American actress
- Moretz Stadium, stadium in North Carolina
