= Hickory FC =

Soccer club in Hickory, North Carolina

- Full name: Hickory Football Club
- Nickname: The Trees
- Founded: 2023; 3 years ago
- Stadium: Moretz Stadium; Hickory, North Carolina
- Coach: Carlos Rubio
- League: USL League Two
- 2026: USL League Two; South Atlantic Division: 4th; Playoffs: DNQ
- Website: hickoryfc.com
Home colours	Away colours

Hickory FC is a semi-professional men's soccer club based in Hickory, North Carolina. Led by an ownership group consisting of five families, the club was founded in 2023. It competes in USL League Two, an amateur league in the United States league system, and previously played in the National Premier Soccer League. It plays its home games at Moretz Stadium.

== History ==
Serious discussions about bringing a semi-professional soccer club to Hickory began in late 2022, with the club being officially announced as an expansion club of the NPSL in late 2023.

In their inaugural season, Hickory FC finished the regular season second in the NPSL's Southeast Conference. In the playoffs, they won the Southeast Conference championship before falling in the South Region semifinals. In their second season, Hickory FC finished the regular season first in the NPSL's Southeast Conference. In the conference playoff final, Hickory FC beat Appalachian FC 1-0 after extra time, in front of a then record crowd of 5,758 fans, to win the Southeast Conference championship for the second straight season. Hickory FC would go on to win two more home matches in the 2025 NPSL playoffs, defeating Lubbock Matadors SC 1-0 in the South region final and Ristozi FC 3-2 in the National semifinals. The home win over Ristozi FC set a new home attendance record of 6,247 fans. In the NPSL National final played in San Francisco, Hickory FC beat the defending NPSL champions El Farolito SC 3-2 to win the club's first NPSL national championship.

== Club culture ==
=== Colors and crest ===
The club colors are red and black. The crest draws from the foundations of Hickory as a city with the Hickory tree and the railroad track that played a prominent role.

=== Supporters ===
Hickory FC's supporters group is the 28601. The group consists of fans that play different instruments including drums and trumpets, and they put up tifos across the stadium.

=== Rivalries ===
Hickory FC's main rivalry is with Appalachian FC. The clubs' cities, Hickory and Boone, are separated by just 45 miles. Coincidently, both cities are also home to a campus of Appalachian State University. Hickory FC also has secondary rivalries with Asheville City SC and Statesville FC. Hickory FC, Appalachian FC, and Asheville City SC play in a three-way derby series known as the Old North Cup, given that all three clubs are located in cities considered to be in Western North Carolina (coincidently, Asheville, Hickory, and Boone are the first, second, and third most populous cities, respectively, in the region as well). Hickory FC and Statesville FC compete in the I-40 Derby, named for Interstate 40 that passes through both Statesville and Hickory.

The club also had a rivalry with Charlottestowne Hops FC in the NPSL along with Appalachian FC in the Moonshine Cup.

== Year-by-year ==
Season	League										Position		Playoffs	U.S. Open Cup
Season	League	Conference/Division	Pld	W	D	L	GF	GA	GD	Pts	Conf./Div.	Overall	Playoffs	U.S. Open Cup
2024	NPSL	Southeast	10	7	1	2	26	14	+12	22	2nd of 8	18th of 92	Region Semifinals	DNQ
2025	NPSL	Southeast	10	9	1	0	31	7	+24	28	1st of 8	3rd of 75	National Champions	DNQ
2026	USL2	South Atlantic	14	9	1	4	28	15	+13	28	4th of 11	36th of 158	DNQ	DNQ
Total			34	25	3	6	85	36	+49	78				

== Honors ==
=== Club ===
- NPSL
  - Southeast Conference Regular Season Winners (1): 2025
  - Southeast Conference Champions (2): 2024, 2025
  - South Region Champions (1): 2025
  - National Champions (1): 2025
- Hank Steinbrecher Cup
  - Participants (1): 2026

=== Personnel ===
Year	Personnel	Country	Position	Honor
2025	Antonio Pineda	USA	Midfield	NPSL Southeast Conference MVP
2025	Antonio Pineda	USA	Midfield	NPSL Golden Ball
2025	Carlos Rubio	SPA	Manager	NPSL Coach of the Season
2025	Tomas Pollacchi	ARG	Midfield	NPSL National Final Man of the Match
