= Duluth FC =

American soccer club

- Full name: Duluth Football Club
- Nickname: the BlueGreens
- Founded: January 16, 2015; 11 years ago
- Stadium: Walt Hunting Stadium
- Capacity: 3,000
- Owner: John Shuster; Alex Giuliani
- Head Coach: William Maanstroem
- League: NPSL
- Regular Season: North Conference, 2nd Place Playoffs: National Quarterfinals
- Website: duluthfc.com
Home colors	Away colors

Duluth FC is an amateur men's soccer club based in Duluth, Minnesota. The club currently competes in the NPSL Midwest Region's North Conference. The club's colors are green and blue, and plays its home matches at Duluth Public Schools Stadium in West Duluth.

== History ==
Duluth FC was founded in 2015 by Father Timothy Sas. In their inaugural season (2015), the club competed in the Duluth Amateur Soccer League. The club joined the American Premier League for the 2016 season, placing second in their six-team division.

On December 15, 2016, NPSL announced that Duluth FC would join the league as an expansion team for the 2017 season, and would compete in the NPSL Midwest Region's North Conference. On July 15, 2017; Duluth FC defeated the Sioux Falls Thunder in the final game of the season to win the NPSL North Conference.

Duluth FC is unique in the sense that it requires its players and supporters to follow certain rules when it comes to match day behavior, requesting that both avoid swearing and other forms of offensive language. Duluth FC are most commonly known as "The BlueGreens," coming from the colors blue and green in Duluth's city flag.

On February 6, 2019, it was announced that 2019 home games would be held at Duluth East's Ordean Stadium while their previous home field, Public Schools Stadium, was undergoing construction. Games are now back at Public Schools Stadium in West Duluth.

In November 2022, the club ownership was transferred to Olympic curling gold medalist John Shuster and local businessman Alex Giuliani.

== Personnel ==
=== Front office ===
- John Shuster – Owner
- Alex Giuliani – Owner
- Beckett Sherman – Assistant Coach
- Sidney Burell – General Manager
- Atle Rennan – Gameday Manager
- Kaden Bergman – Press Box Manager
- Cole Gewerth – Graphic Designer
- Jeffrey McClure – Head Staff Writer
- Sharon Lahti – Matchday Manager

=== Managers ===
- 2015: Tim Sas
- 2016–2017: Kyle Bakas
- 2018–2019: Joel Person
- 2020–2024: Sean Morgan
- 2025: Thomás Pazo
- 2026–Present: William Mannstroem

== Statistics ==
=== List of Seasons ===
Year	Division	League	Regular Season	Played	Won	Lost	Drawn	Goals For	Goals Against	Difference	Playoffs	Open Cup
2016	5	APL	2nd, Overall	8	4	0	4	26	15	+11	N/A	Not eligible
2017	4	NPSL	1st, North Conference	14	8	2	4	42	18	+24	Midwest Region Semifinals	Did not enter
2018	4	NPSL	2nd, North Conference	14	8	2	4	31	15	+16	National Semifinals	2nd Round
2019	4	NPSL	3rd, Midwest-North	12	8	2	2	38	11	+27	Did not qualify	1st Round
2020	4	NPSL	Season Cancelled due to Covid									Cancelled
2021	4	NPSL	2nd, North Conference	12	9	3	0	39	20	+19	Midwest Region Quarterfinals	Did not enter
2022	4	NPSL	2nd, North Conference	14	11	2	1	43	12	+31	Midwest Region Semifinals	Did not enter
2023	4	NPSL	1st, North Conference	12	11	0	1	39	6	+33	North Conference Final	Did not enter
2024	4	NPSL	2nd, North Conference	12	7	4	1	41	17	+24	National Semifinals	First Round
2025	4	NPSL	1st, North Conference	10	7	1	2	17	8	+9	North Conference Semifinals	First Round
2026	4	NPSL	2nd, North Conference	10	6	3	1	26	9	+17	National Quarterfinals	Did not enter
Overall				118	79	19	20	342	131	+211	–	

=== Historic Record vs Opponents ===
Opponent	Record (W-L-T)	Biggest Victory	Biggest Defeat
FC Minneapolis	2–0–0	W 3–0	N/A
Minnesota Twinstars FC	3–0–3	W 3–2	N/A
La Crosse Aris FC*	6–0–0	W 8–1	N/A
Minneapolis City SC	3–2–2	W 2–1	L 2–4
Sioux Falls Thunder FC	6–0–1	W 9–1	N/A
Dakota Fusion FC	4–1–1	W 6–0	L 1–2
Rochester Med City FC*	2–1–3	W 1–0	L 1–3
Viejos Son Los Trapos FC*	2–2–0	W 3–2	L 1–4
AFC Ann Arbor	1–0–0	W 3(4)-3(3)	N/A
Grand Rapids FC*	1–0–0	W 2(4)-2(3)	N/A
Miami FC	0–1–0	N/A	L 0–3
Saint Louis FC*	0–1–0	N/A	L 0–2
Detroit City FC	0–1–0	N/A	L 2–5
FC Fargo*	1–0–1	W 3–2	N/A
La Crosse Aris FC Reserves*	1–0–1	W 6–1	N/A
Minnesota TwinStars Reserves*	0–0–2	N/A	N/A

*Team folded

== Honors ==
=== NPSL ===
- Regular Season Champions (1): 2023
- Midwest Region Champions (2): 2018, 2024
- North Conference Champions (3): 2017, 2024, 2026
