= Sioux Falls Thunder FC =

Sioux Falls Thunder
- Full name: Sioux Falls Thunder Football Club
- Short name: Thunder
- Founded: November 4, 2016; 9 years ago
- Stadium: USF Bob Young Field
- Capacity: 5,000
- Owners: Matt, Naomi & Jon Dobson
- Head Coach: John Hakari
- League: NPSL
- Website: sfthunderfc.com
Home colors	Away colors

Sioux Falls Thunder FC is a men's soccer club based in Sioux Falls, South Dakota. The club currently competes in the National Premier Soccer League in the North Conference, having joined the league as an expansion team in 2016. The team's colors are red and black.

== History ==
=== Timeline ===
The club was founded by Amadu Meyers in 2016, coinciding with the announcement that it would be joining NPSL as an expansion team for the 2017 season. The club played their inaugural match on May 13, 2017, at Yankton Trail Park in Sioux Falls against the Dakota Fusion FC. The first goal scored in team history came in the 6th minute when Houston Hoffman connected on a penalty kick. The Thunder would end up losing the match 3-1. The Thunder got their first win on May 30, 2017, against LC Aris FC by a score of 3-0. On March 1, 2018, the club announced that Mekonnen Afa would become the third head coach in franchise history. The Thunder would start the 2018 season strong by taking 4 points in the first 2 games. But after that they would struggle and lose 9 straight games. The Thunder would finally get on the winning side of things by winning 5-2 against Dakota Fusion FC. They would carry that momentum and they would eventually win their next two games to finish the season with a total of 4 wins. After the regular season concluded Nigel Nielsen, Thunder midfielder, was named to the North Conference XI team.

=== Season-by-Season Record ===
Year	NPSL Regular season							Position			Postseason	
Year	P	W	L	T	GF	GA	Pts	Div.	Conf.	Leag.	NPSL	USOC
2017	14	3	7	4	22	31	13	7th	19th	72nd	Did not qualify	Did not qualify
2018	14	4	9	1	25	33	13	7th	18th	73rd	Did not qualify	Did not qualify
2019	12	2	8	2	15	26	8	5th	15th	70th	Did not qualify	Did not qualify
2021	12	2	7	3	18	35	9	6th	13th	61st	Did not qualify	Did not qualify
2022	14	3	6	5	27	28	14	5th	11th	58th	Did not qualify	Did not qualify
2023	12	1	8	3	19	27	6	7th		82nd	Did not qualify	Did not qualify
2024	12	1	7	4	10	27	7	6th		73rd	Did not qualify	Did not qualify
2025	10	4	5	1	15	22	13	3rd		44th	Conf SF	Did not qualify
2026	10	2	6	2	13	28	8	6th		44th	Did not qualify	Did not qualify

=== All-Time Top Goalscorers ===
Leading Career Goal Scorers
#	Name	Career	Total
1	(United States) Tyler Limmer	2017, 2021–22	12
2	(United States) Brice Holiday	2017-19	8
3	(Haiti) Stevenson Storm	2019, 2021–22	6
T4	(Republic of Ireland) James Bolger	2022	5
T4	(United States) Michael Haight	2017-18	5
T4	(Mexico) Manny Rosas Quiroz	2018	5
T4	(United States) Lucas Trimble	2019	5

Bold Signifies a Current Thunder Player

== Team ==
=== Current roster ===
Note: Flags indicate national team as defined under FIFA eligibility rules; some limited exceptions apply. Players may hold more than one non-FIFA nationality.

No.	Pos.	Nation	Player
1	GK	ENG	Johnny Thurbin
2	FW	USA	Josiah Trimble
3	MF	USA	Brennan Haggerty
4	DF	SOM	Ayanleh Hassan
5	DF	BDI	Bigirimana Omari
6	MF	CRC	Emmanuel Jon Coronado
7	FW	USA	Alex Jacobs
8	FW	SVK	Lubos Polacko
9	DF	SCO	Jack Crombie
10	MF	ENG	Callum Bryan
11	FW	JPN	Ryushiro Morita
12	FW	TAN	David Bizimana
13	MF	USA	Armando Garcia-Perez
14	FW	NOR	Vetle Auglænd

No.	Pos.	Nation	Player
15	DF	USA	Robert Amaro
16	MF	USA	Trace Dobson
17	DF	USA	Joshua Seyer
18	DF	DEN	Patrick Hedegård Hansen
19	MF	MEX	Eric Beltran
20	MF	BRA	Bernardo Torres
21	FW	ENG	Marcus Horwood (Captain)
22	DF	NGA	Stephen Ayodele
23	MF	ENG	Lewis Albert
24	MF	LBR	Samuel Dolobaipu
77	GK	USA	Wil Rieves
99	GK	ENG	Jack Howard
—	MF	MEX	Alexis Gonzalez
—	MF	GHA	Isaac Sam

=== Staff ===
As of March 5, 2023

Coaching staff
Team Owner	Matt, Naomi & Jon Dobson
Head coach	John Hakari
