= Jimmy Nielsen =

Danish footballer (born 1977)

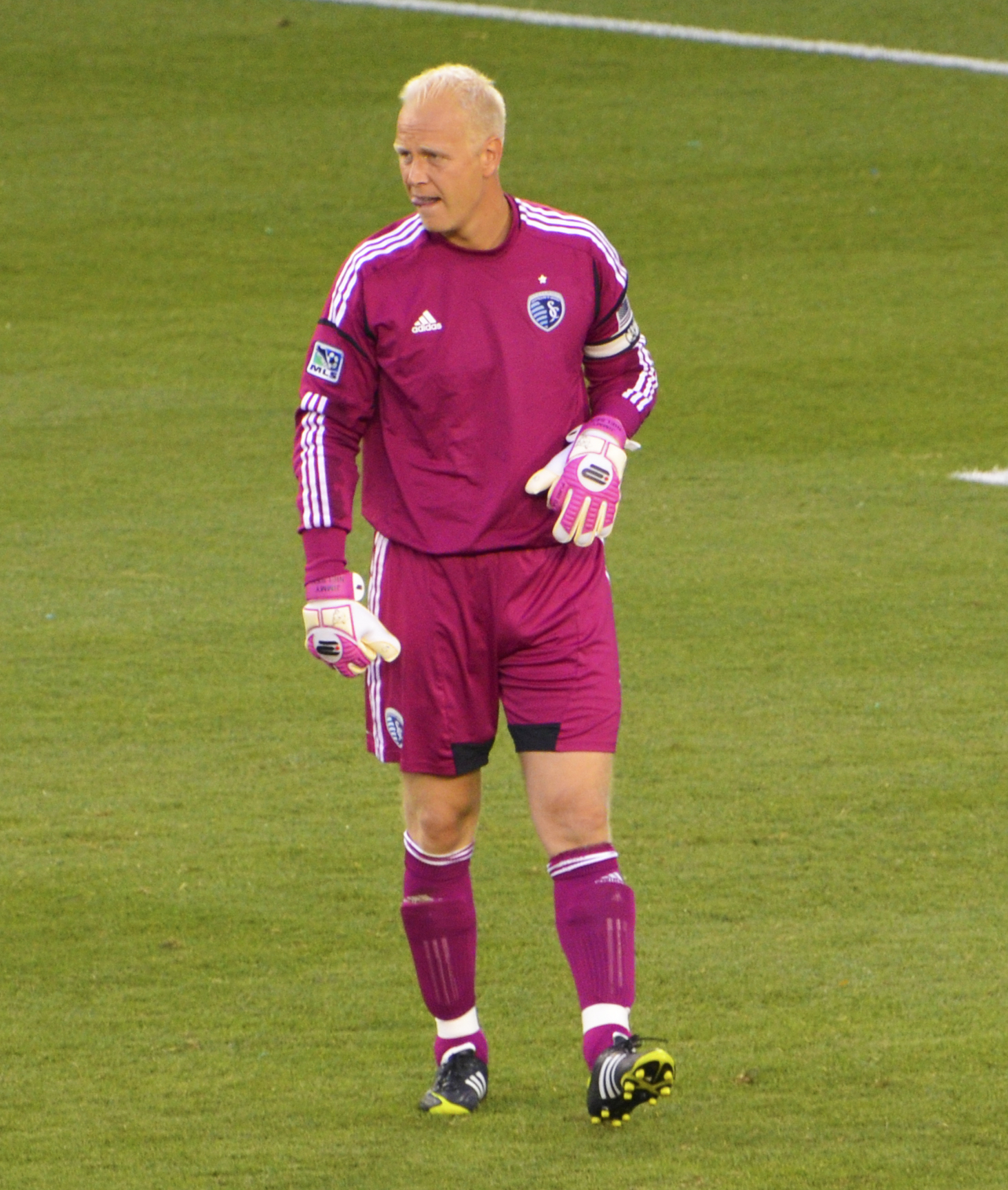
- Nielsen in 2012

Personal information
- Date of birth: 6 August 1977 (age 49)
- Place of birth: Aalborg, Denmark
- Height: 1.91 m (6 ft 3 in)
- Position: Goalkeeper

Youth career
- 1989–1992: Norwich City
- B52/Aalborg FC
- –1994: AaB

Senior career*
Years	Team	Apps	(Gls)
1994–1995	Millwall	0	(0)
1995–2007	AaB	342	(0)
2007–2008	Leicester City	0	(0)
2008–2010	Vejle	63	(0)
2010–2013	Sporting Kansas City	128	(0)
Total		533	(0)

International career
1994–1997	Denmark U19	11	(0)
1997–1999	Denmark U21	17	(0)
1999–2003	Denmark League XI	4	(0)

Managerial career
- 2014–2017: Oklahoma City Energy
- 2019: Hartford Athletic
- 2022: Houston Dynamo (assistant)
- 2025: Oklahoma United FC
- * Club domestic league appearances and goals

Jimmy Nielsen (born 6 August 1977) is a Danish retired footballer who played as a goalkeeper.

Until June 2007, he played 398 games for Danish team AaB Fodbold. Playing every league match for AaB since 1997, Nielsen won the 1999 Danish Superliga championship with AaB. Nielsen has on occasion featured in the Danish national team setup as an unused substitute. He won the 1998 and 2004 Danish Goalkeeper of the Year award.

== Club career ==
=== Europe ===
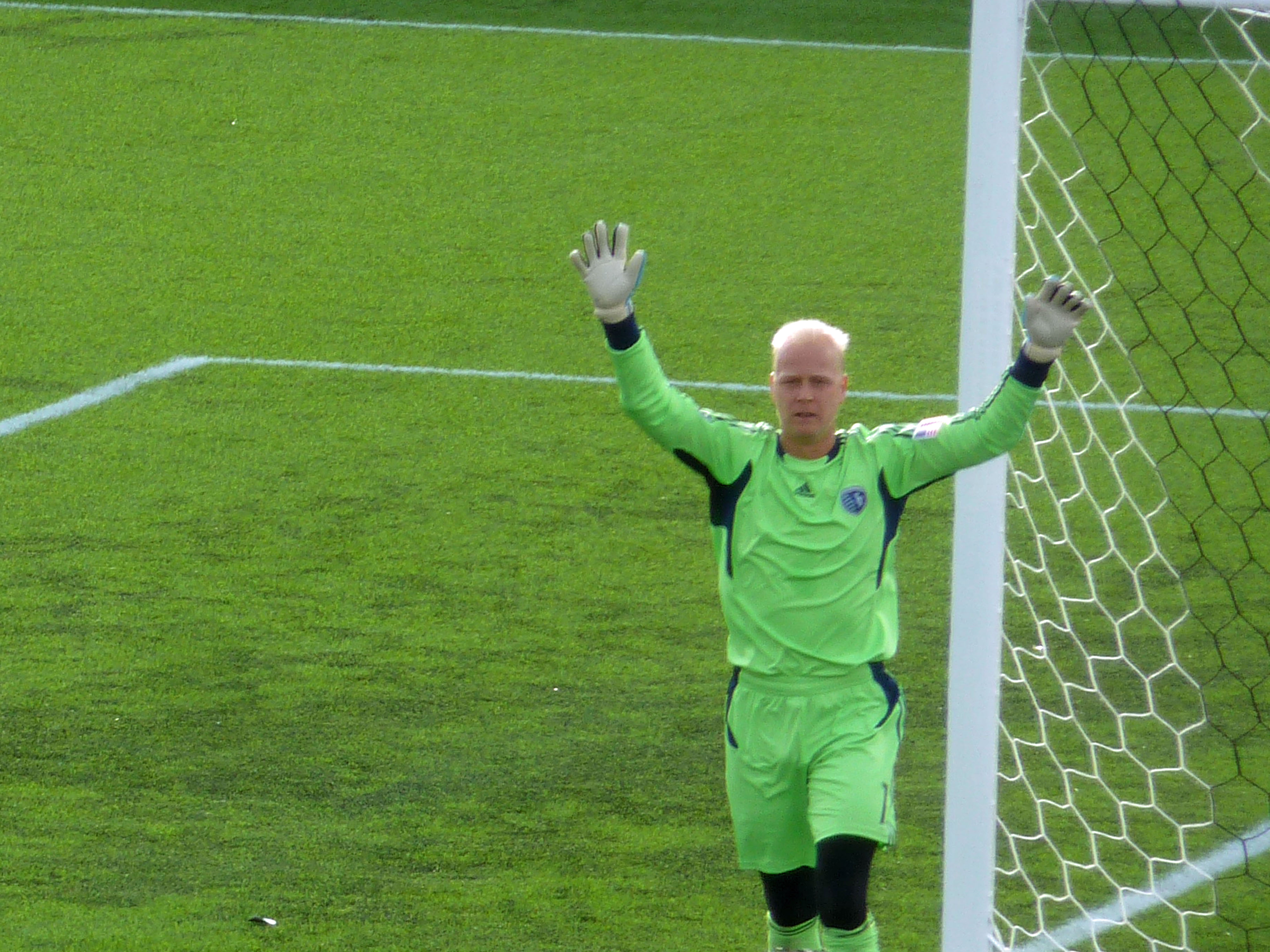
Jimmy Nielsen with Sporting Kansas City in April 2011

Nielsen began his career with Norwich City at the age of 12. He was discovered after Norwich City's youth team traveled to Aalborg to take part in a local youth tournament but their only goalkeeper, Ash Harrison, fell ill and Nielsen was recruited as a replacement. He played for Norwich City until the age of 15 when he was offered professional terms but his mother refused permission for him to move permanently to England. Following this he was signed by local amateur club B 52/Aalborg FC. He played youth football for AaB Fodbold, before signing for English club Millwall F.C. in 1994. He did not play for the club and moved back to Denmark, settling in at AaB in 1995. He made his senior debut in 1996, quickly becoming the starting goalkeeper in AaB. Nielsen was one of the cornerstones of AaB, culminating in the 1998–99 Danish Superliga championship.

Nielsen signed a contract with Leicester City on 4 June 2007. He joined via Martin Allen's agent, who claimed he was "another Peter Schmeichel". However, he was left in the reserve squad following the arrival of Hungarian goalkeeper Márton Fülöp. As a result, Nielsen revealed he planned to leave the club during the January transfer window, and was given the green light to do so on 14 November. He left the club on 22 January 2008 having his contract terminated by mutual consent without ever having played for the club. The next day he signed a 2 1/2-year contract with Danish team Vejle Boldklub. After the 2009 season, Nielsen was "very close" to retiring Vejle Boldklub, was relegated from the Danish Superliga.

=== Major League Soccer ===
In February 2010, after having a conversation with and receiving a contract offer from Peter Vermes, Nielsen moved to Major League Soccer team Sporting Kansas City. After his first season, Nielsen stated that he would love to stay with the club another two or three years before considering retirement again.

As reported on 15 December 2010, Nielsen signed a one-year contract extension to stay with the club through at least the 2011 MLS season. He was sent off for a handball outside the box on 9 June 2011, in Sporting Kansas City's inaugural game at their new stadium, Livestrong Sporting Park. On 28 November 2011, Nielsen signed a contract extension with Kansas City through the 2013 season. The contract also included an option for the 2014 season. Nielsen received the 2012 MLS Goalkeeper of the Year award. He broke the club record with 0.79 goals against average and helped the team finish first in their division. Nielsen retired following the 2013 season, which saw him win the MLS Cup. He played the MLS Cup with broken ribs.

== International career ==
During a session with the Denmark national under-21 football team in 1999, Nielsen and U-21 teammates Allan Kierstein Jepsen and Peter Degn went to the Munkebjerg casino in Vejle at night to gamble. They were subsequently excluded from all national team practices, a ban that lasted several years. This earned Nielsen the nickname Casino-Jimmy.

== Coaching career ==
Following his retirement, Nielsen was named head coach of OKC Energy FC of the United Soccer League.

Nielsen joined Hartford Athletic of the United Soccer League as head coach for its inaugural season in 2019. Nielsen and Hartford mutually agreed to part ways at the conclusion of the 2019 season.

Nielsen joined the technical staff of Houston Dynamo FC on 13 January 2022. On 5 September 2022 Nielsen was relieved of his duties at Houston alongside head coach Paulo Nagamura.

On 4 December 2025, Nielsen was announced as head coach of Oklahoma United FC for the inaugural season in the Lone Star Conference of the National Premier Soccer League.

== Managerial statistics ==
As of 17 April 2019

Managerial record by team and tenure
Team	From	To	Record				
Team	From	To	P	W	D	L	Win %
OKC Energy	20 December 2013	16 November 2017	136	54	38	44	39.71
Hartford Athletic	5 September 2018	27 October 2019	36	9	5	22	25.00
Career total			172	63	43	66	36.63

== Honours ==
AaB

- Danish Superliga: 1998–99

Sporting Kansas City

- Lamar Hunt U.S. Open Cup: 2012
- MLS Cup: 2013
- MLS Eastern Conference (playoff): 2013
- MLS Eastern Conference (regular season): 2010, 2012

Individual

- MLS All-Star: 2010, 2012
- MLS Best XI: 2012
- MLS Goalkeeper of the Year: 2012
- Sporting Kansas City Most Valuable Player: 2011, 2012
- Danish Goalkeeper of the Year: 1998, 2004

Sporting positions
Preceded by Bora Zivkovic	Vejle captain 2008–2010	Succeeded by Steffen Kielstrup
Preceded by Davy Arnaud	Sporting Kansas City captain 2012–2013	Succeeded by Matt Besler
