= West Chester United SC =

American soccer club

- Full name: West Chester United Soccer Club
- Nicknames: Predators, The PREDS, United, Dub C, WCUSC
- Founded: 1976; 50 years ago
- Stadium: Kildare's Field
- President: Mick Harrison & Brad Sugiyama
- Manager: Brad Sugiyama
- Head coach: Blaise Santangelo
- League: National Premier Soccer League; USL League Two
Home colors

West Chester United SC is an American soccer club based in West Chester, Pennsylvania, that currently competes in both the National Premier Soccer League (NPSL) and USL League Two. The organization also fields a side in the United Soccer League of Pennsylvania, a fully-amateur state league.

== History ==
The team was announced on January 18, 2017 as a National Premier Soccer League expansion team. West Chester is a non-profit youth organization, with over 3,400 boys and girls ages 3 to 18 and approximately 350 adult players.

On January 14, 2020, USL League Two announced that West Chester United would join the league for the 2020 season in the Mid Atlantic Division.

Since 2017, WCUSC has had a rivalry with fellow Pennsylvania side Philadelphia Lone Star FC, which also joined the NPSL in 2017. Both teams' first league match was against one-another and made the first leg of a derby, the Route 3 Derby, with the winner after both legs being awarded the Kildare's Cup. West Chester has won the cup every year of its existence, with the closest series coming in 2019 when United won 4–3 after initially losing the first game for the first time. WCUSC hasn't lost a Kildare's Cup in their history.

On July 26, 2025, West Chester United beat RWB Adria in extra-time 4-3 to win the 2025 National Amateur Cup in Milwaukee, Wisconsin. Although goals from Josh Luchini, Jack Jasinski, and Giuliano Whitchurch provided United with a 1-goal advantage heading into stoppage time, Manon secured his hat-trick in the 90+6' minute to send the game to an extra 30 minutes. In the second half of extra-time, with just 30 seconds on the clock before penalty kicks, Columbia University defender Joseph McDaid scored a header in the 120th minute of extra-time off a Dylan Lacy cross to secure the championship title. It was the first ever Amateur Cup won by a team in the Philadelphia area since Philadelphia Inter won back-to-back titles in 1973 and 1974.

West Chester United SC look to rebound off of a loss to Loudoun United in the U.S. Open Cup in 2025, after losing the game 3-2 with Kenneth Roby and Yassine Elkahloun on the scoresheet. The game at YSC Sports on March 17, 2026, is yet to be hosted, and is awaiting a result as of February 2026.

In February 2026, the Ultras 1772 fan group for West Chester United SC was created on YouTube and Instagram. The account has posted chants, informational content, and humorous posts relative to the squad's current status.

== Year-by-year ==
=== NPSL ===
Year	League	Regular season	Playoffs	U.S. Open Cup
2017	NPSL	3rd, Keystone Conference	Conference Semifinal	Ineligible
2018	NPSL	3rd, Keystone Conference	Conference Final	did not qualify
2019	NPSL	2nd, Keystone Conference	Conference Semifinal	did not qualify
2020	NPSL	Season cancelled due to COVID-19 pandemic		
2021	NPSL	1st, Keystone Conference	Conference Semifinal	did not qualify
2022	NPSL	2nd, Keystone Conference	Conference Final	did not qualify
2023	NPSL	1st, Keystone Conference West	Conference Champs	did not qualify
2024	NPSL	1st, Keystone Conference West	Regional Semifinals	First Round
2025	NPSL	1st, Keystone Conference West	Regional Finals	did not qualify
2026	NPSL	2nd, Keystone Conference West	Quarterfinals	First Round

=== USL League Two ===
Year	League	Reg. season	Playoffs	U.S. Open Cup
2020	USL League Two	Season cancelled due to COVID-19 pandemic		
2021	USL League Two	1st, Mid Atlantic	Conference Finals	did not qualify
2022	USL League Two	2nd, Mid Atlantic	did not qualify	1st Round
2023	USL League Two	2nd, Mid Atlantic	did not qualify	did not qualify
2024	USL League Two	3rd, Mid Atlantic	did not qualify	did not qualify
2025	USL League Two	1st, Mid Atlantic	Conference Quarterfinals	1st Round
2026	USL League Two	6th, Mid Atlantic	did not qualify	1st Round

== Honors ==
=== NPSL ===
- Kildare's Cup (3): 2017, 2018, 2019
- Keystone Conference (2): 2021, 2023
- East Region (1): 2023

=== USL League Two ===
- Mid Atlantic Division (1): 2021

=== Amateur ===
- United Soccer League of Pennsylvania (4): 2015–16, 2016–17, 2017–18, 2018–19
- Northeast Elite Soccer League: Champion (2019)
- Eastern Pennsylvania Soccer Association Open Cup (4): 2011–12, 2012–13, 2013–14, 2014–15
- Eastern Pennsylvania Soccer Association Amateur Open Cup (2): 2017–18, 2018–19
- USASA Region I Werner Fricker Open Cup (1): 2015
- Werner Fricker Open Cup (1): 2015
- USASA Region I Amateur Cup (2): 2018, 2025
- National Amateur Cup
  - Champions (1):2025
  - Runners-up (1): 2018
