= Carlos Martínez =

Carlos Martínez may refer to:

== People ==
=== Arts and entertainment ===
- Carlos Martínez (actor) (born 1955), Spanish actor
- Carlos Martínez Aguirre (born 1974), Spanish poet
- Carlos Martínez Baena (1889–1971), Spanish-Mexican actor
- Carlos Martínez Mínguez (born 1973), Spanish politician
- Carlos Martínez Rivas (1924–1998), Nicaraguan poet

=== Politicians ===
- Carlos Martínez Alonso (born 1950), Spanish politician
- Carlos Martínez de Irujo, 1st Marquis of Casa Irujo (1763–1864), Spanish prime minister (1823–1824) and diplomat
- Carlos Martínez de Irujo, 2nd Marquess of Casa Irujo (1802–1855), Spanish politician and prime minister (1847)
- Carlos Martínez Martínez (born 1964), Mexican politician
- Carlos Roberto Martínez (1889–1962), Chilean miner and politician
- Carlos Méndez Martínez (born 1943), Puerto Rican politician
- Carlos Walker Martínez (1842–1905), Chilean lawyer, politician and poet
- José Carlos Martínez (politician) (1962–2011), Argentine politician

=== Sportspeople ===
==== Baseball players ====
- Carlos Martínez (infielder) (1965–2006), Venezuelan baseball player
- Carlos Martínez (pitcher, born 1982), Dominican baseball player for the Florida Marlins
- Carlos Martínez (pitcher, born 1991), Dominican baseball player for the St. Louis Cardinals

==== Footballers ====
- Carlos Martínez (footballer, born 1980), Spanish football left winger
- Carlos Martínez (footballer, born April 1986), Spanish football rightback
- Carlos Martínez (footballer, born June 1986), Spanish football striker
- Carlos Martínez (footballer, born February 1989), Spanish football winger
- Carlos Martínez (footballer, born August 1989), Spanish football midfielder
- Carlos Martínez (footballer, 1995-2003), Mexican football attacking midfielder
- Carlos Martínez (footballer, born 1997), Spanish football forward
- Carlos Martínez (footballer, born 1999), Costa Rican football defender
- Carlos Martínez (Uruguayan footballer) (1940–2015), Uruguayan footballer
- Carlos Martínez Arribas (born 1988), known as Carletes, Spanish football forward
- Carlos Julio Martínez (born 1994), Dominican international football rightback
- Juan Carlos Martínez (footballer) (born 1991), Mexican football forward

==== Other sports ====
- Carlos Martínez (American football) (born 1980), American gridiron football kicker
- Carlos Martínez (sprinter) (born 1945), Cuban Olympic sprinter
- Carlos Martínez (boxer) (born 1978), Mexican boxer
- Carlos Alberto Martínez (born 1957), Argentine Olympic skier
- Carlos Martínez (Mexican runner) (1950–2013), Mexican middle-distance runner

=== Other fields ===
- Carlos Martínez Gorriarán (born 1959), Spanish scholar
- Carlos Martínez Shaw (born 1945), Spanish historian

== Places ==
- Capitán FAP Carlos Martínez de Pinillos International Airport, in Trujillo, Peru
- Polideportivo Carlos Martínez Balmori, indoor arena in Mineral de la Reforma, Mexico

== See also ==
- Carles Martínez (born 1988), Spanish football midfielder
- Martínez (surname)
