= Oklahoma United FC =

- Full name: Oklahoma United Football Club
- Founded: January 30, 2025; 17 months ago
- Stadium: Chad Richison Stadium
- Capacity: 12,000
- Owner: Abdullah Ashraf
- Manager: Jimmy Nielsen
- League: TLFC
- Website: oklahomaunitedfc.com
Home colours

Oklahoma United Football Club is an American men's soccer club based in Oklahoma City, Oklahoma. The club is a member of the The League for Clubs, an elite amateur league in US Soccer that includes qualification for and participation in the US Open Cup.

== History ==
The National Premier Soccer League announced the creation of the expansion club, Oklahoma United FC, on January 30, 2025. The club played in the Lone Star conference of the South Region of the NPSL for the 2025 season. The club joined The League for Clubs for the 2026 season.

== Players ==
=== Roster ===
As of April 24, 2025

Note: Flags indicate national team as defined under FIFA eligibility rules; some limited exceptions apply. Players may hold more than one non-FIFA nationality.

No.	Pos.	Nation	Player
0	GK	USA	Ryder Clayborn
1	GK	BEL	Alexis Bertrand
2	DF	ITA	Lorenzo Nardini
3	DF	BRA	Samuel Malhow
4	MF	NZL	Jarrod McKenchie
5	MF	JPN	Keita Kishino
6	MF	FRA	Thomas Brulay (captain)
7	FW	ESP	Alvar Silva
8	MF	COL	Juan David Valencia Vacca
9	FW	ITA	Marco Alongi
10	FW	FRA	David Imbert
11	FW	USA	Isaias Silva
13	DF	ENG	Tyler Ackah-Wheatcroft
15	FW	USA	Ivan Castañeda
16	DF	ENG	Jonty Clarke
17	FW	USA	Hannan Ashraf
18	FW	BRA	Bernardo Duarte
19	FW	ITA	Renato Disha
20	MF	ESP	Sergio Sanchez

No.	Pos.	Nation	Player
21	DF	USA	Ryan Moon
22	FW	MLI	Aboubakr Diallo
23	FW	ESP	Igor Caballero
25	DF	BRB	Shay Prescod
27	GK	ENG	Billy Panter
28	FW	BEL	Harry Tremblez
29	MF	BRA	Henrique Duarte
30	FW	USA	Ethan Nakolo
33	DF	USA	Isaac Dalhart
37	GK	GER	Fynn Körner
42	MF	IRL	AJ Bowman
44	MF	GHA	Gideon Quansah
66	FW	USA	Roman Hemphill
70	MF	BRA	Matheus Mantovani
87	MF	USA	Danny Gutierrez
88	DF	AUS	Elliott Forestier
90	FW	ENG	Louis Bassett
99	MF	FRA	François Geris-Rey

== Team management ==
=== Executive ===
Ownership and senior management
President	(United States) Abdullah Ashraf
Executive Vice President	(United States) Sauban Hanif
Executive Vice President	(United States) Zain Ahmed

=== Coaching ===
Coaching Staff
Head Coach	(Denmark) Jimmy Nielsen

== Year-by-year ==
=== Yearly results ===
Year	Division	League	Regular season	W-D-L	GF–GA	Playoffs	W-D-L	GF–GA
2025	4	NPSL	3rd of 7, Lonestar Conference	6–2–2	30–17	Conference Semifinals	0–0–1	2–5

=== All-Time table ===
Match Type	Played	Won	Drawn	Lost	Goals For	Goals Against	Goal Difference	Win %
Regular Season	10	6	2	2	30	17	+13	60.00
Playoffs	1	0	0	1	2	5	−3	0.00
Total	11	6	2	3	32	22	+10	54.55

== Head coaches ==
- Includes all competitive matches: regular season and playoffs

3
Coach	Nationality	Start	End	Games	Win	Draw	Loss	GF	GA	GD	Win %
Antonio Barros	Brazil	January 31, 2025	July 9, 2025	11	6	2	3	32	22	+10	54.55
Jimmy Nielsen	Denmark	December 3,2025	Present	1	1	0	0	3	0		
100
