= Reese Stadium =

Stadium in New Haven, Connecticut

- Interactive map of Reese Stadium
- Former names: Soccer-Lacrosse Stadium (1981–2011)
- Address: New Haven, CT; United States
- Coordinates: 41°18′42″N 72°57′44″W
- Owner: Yale University
- Operator: Yale University Athletics
- Capacity: 3,000
- Type: Stadium
- Surface: FieldTurf
- Current use: Soccer; Lacrosse

Construction
- Opened: 1981; 45 years ago
- Renovated: 2011, 2018

Tenants
- Yale Bulldogs (NCAA) teams: men's and women's soccer (1981–pres.); men's and women's lacrosse (1981–pres.); Professional teams: Elm City Express (NPSL) (2017–18); New Haven United FC (NPSL) (2025–pres.)

Website
- yalebulldogs.com/reese-stadium

Reese Stadium is a stadium located on the campus of Yale University in New Haven, Connecticut. It is home to the Yale Bulldogs men's and women's soccer and men's and women's lacrosse teams.

The venue stands at the heart of Yale's athletics complex, which includes facilities such as the Yale Bowl, the Cullman-Heyman Tennis Center, and other sports fields.

The stadium seats 3,000 people and opened in 1981. It was named "Soccer-Lacrosse Stadium" until April 2011 when the venue was renovated and renamed for the Reese family who donated money for the project. The stadium was named after the Reese family not only for their financial contributions to the renovation, but also in honor of their history of lacrosse excellence at Yale. Midfielder Jon Reese set the record for most goals in a season (82), while Jason Reese was a star goalkeeper.

During the 1995 Special Olympics World Summer Games, it hosted the soccer matches. Reese Stadium was also the home of the Elm City Express professional soccer team in 2017–18. The now-defunct team left the venue when it underwent renovation in 2018.
