= New Haven United FC =

Soccer club in Connecticut, US

- Full name: New Haven United Football Club
- Founded: 2025
- Stadium: Reese Stadium; New Haven, Connecticut
- Capacity: 3,000
- League: National Premier Soccer League
- 2025: Reg. Season: 2nd, North Atlantic Conference; Playoffs: Regional semifinals

New Haven United FC is an American soccer club based in New Haven, Connecticut. The team plays in the National Premier Soccer League Northeast Region, North Atlantic Conference. Their inaugural season was 2025. They play their home matches at Reese Stadium.

== History ==
New Haven United was announced as a new National Premier Soccer League club on February 25, 2025, beginning play in the 2025 season.

In the club's first season, they finished second in the North Atlantic Conference, qualifying for the playoffs. In the conference semifinal, New Haven defeated New York Shockers 2–1. In the conference final, New Haven defeated fellow Connecticut club Hartford City FC 1–0 to win the North Atlantic Conference.

=== Year-by-year ===
Year	Division	League	Venue	Record	Regular season	Playoffs
2025	4	NPSL	Reese Stadium	4–4–2	2nd, North Atlantic Conference	Regional semifinal
2026	4	NPSL	Reese Stadium	6–2–2	1st, North Atlantic Conference	National semifinal

== See also ==
- Elm City Express
- Hartford City FC
