= Buffalo Stallions (NPSL) =

Soccer team in New York state, US

- Founded: January 16, 2025; 20 months ago
- Ground: North Tonawanda High School; North Tonawanda, New York
- Capacity: 2,000
- Coordinates: 43.050764°N 78.870764°W
- President: William Van Slyke
- Head coach: Mark Spacone
- League: National Premier Soccer League
- Website: buffalostallions.org
Home colours

Buffalo Stallions are an American soccer team based in Buffalo, New York. Founded in 2025, it is the only nonprofit soccer franchise and youth academy in the Buffalo region.

The team competes in National Premier Soccer League (NPSL) as part of their Great Lakes Conference, the fourth tier of the American soccer pyramid. Home games are played at North Tonawanda High School.

== History ==
=== Franchise acquisition, 2025 ===
On January 16, 2025, National Premier Soccer League (NPSL) awarded an expansion franchise to Buffalo, New York. It is the fourth NPSL franchise in Buffalo's history, after Queen City FC (2007–2008), Buffalo City FC (2009), and FC Buffalo (2010–2022, now in USL2).

The franchise adopted the name and logo of the defunct indoor soccer team.

William Van Slyke operates the club as a nonprofit, along with a youth academy of the same name. The team has pledged to donate any profit the organization earns to funding scholarships for their academy players.

=== Inaugural season, 2025–present ===
Mark Spacone was named as the team's first head coach in January 2025. Spacone previously coached the Daemen Wildcats in NCAA Division II. He also co-founded Sam's Army while playing full-back for the Buffalo State Bengals.

Rudy Pompert was named the club's assistant coach and technical director. Pompert previously served as head coach of the Buffalo FFillies of W-League and Buffalo State Bengals of NCAA Division III.

The team plays at North Tonawanda High School, where Stallions director of operations Jeff Hoerner was a longtime soccer coach. Sportsplex in North Tonawanda is the team's indoor practice facility, and it was previously used by both the Buffalo Stallions and Buffalo Blizzard.

The club lost its inaugural game at home to Cleveland SC by a score of 3–0 on May 10, 2025. Stanislav Koval led Cleveland in scoring with two goals.

== Players ==
=== Current squad ===
As of July 5, 2025

Note: Flags indicate national team as defined under FIFA eligibility rules; some limited exceptions apply. Players may hold more than one non-FIFA nationality.

No.	Pos.	Nation	Player
0	GK	USA	Jack Petrie
1	GK	USA	Whitaker Sackman
1	GK	USA	Justin Vullo
2	MF	USA	JP Barone
3	DF	BDI	Chris Inganji
4	FW	USA	Andy Loomis
5	MF	USA	Jacob Korte
6	DF	BAH	Jean Tilo
7	DF	USA	Jason Hernandez
8	DF	CAN	Jake McConnery
8	MF	USA	Ben Schmidt
8	FW	CGO	Douglass Tshibuyi
9	FW	BAH	Larry Noel
10	FW	USA	Christopher Griffiths
11	DF	USA	Axel Lozoya

No.	Pos.	Nation	Player
12	DF	USA	Riley Wagner (captain)
13	FW	USA	Chris Cox
14	DF	USA	Sam Mann
15	DF	USA	Riley Quinn
16	DF	SWE	Alexander Khademi
17	FW	USA	Luke Szablewski
18	DF	USA	Thomas Mullane
19	MF	USA	James Bruneau
20	FW	USA	Gianni Pezzino
21	MF	USA	Keegan Herrmann
22	FW	USA	Tyler Warmington
23	DF	USA	Samuel LaMendola
24	DF	USA	Evan Osetkowski
26	GK	USA	Daniel Fiegel II

=== Notable alumni ===
==== Academy ====
Includes players trained under the academy's former incarnations as Buffalo United Soccer Club and the Buffalo branch of Empire United Soccer Academy.

- (Somalia) Abdi Salim
- (United States) Bobby Shuttleworth

== Personnel ==
=== Current technical staff ===
Position	Staff
Head coach	(United States) Mark Spacone
Assistant coach	(Netherlands) Rudy Pompert
Goalkeeping coach	(Colombia) Sebastian Perez-Arteaga

- Last updated: 10 May 2025

== Seasons ==
Buffalo Stallions History (2025–present)
Year	Division	League	Regular season	W-L-D	Playoffs	U.S. Open Cup	Top goalscorer(s)
2025	4	NPSL	6th, Great Lakes	3-7-0	Did not qualify	Did not qualify	Luke Szablewski (5)

== Sponsorships ==
Period	Kit manufacturer	Shirt sponsor (chest)	Shirt sponsor (back)
2025–present	Adidas	Austin Air Systems	Antonio's Banquet & Conference Center

== Media ==
External videos
- Buffalo Stallions home game broadcasts

All Buffalo Stallions home games are streamed live on the club's YouTube channel.

The club's broadcast team consists of Tony Occhiuto of WEBR on play-by-play, and Andy Cash (also of WEBR) on color commentary.
