= Hartford City FC =

- Full name: Hartford City Football Club
- Nickname: The Colts
- Founded: 2015; 11 years ago
- Stadium: Trinity Health Stadium; Hartford, Connecticut
- Capacity: 5,500
- Owner: Aaron Sarwar
- Director of Football: Nick Balistierri
- Head Coach: Louis Beddouri
- League: National Premier Soccer League
- 2024: Reg. Season: 2nd, North Atlantic Conference; Playoffs: Lost Conference Final
- Website: hartfordcity.com
Home colors

Hartford City FC is an American soccer team based in Hartford, Connecticut. Currently the team plays friendly matches as it tries to figure out its future home, the team played in the National Premier Soccer League Northeast Region, North Atlantic Conference in 2025 going deep into the playoffs. The team played its first game during the 2017 season. The Colts play their games at Farmington Sports Arena in Farmington, Connecticut.

== History ==
The team was originally set to play indoor soccer in the Major Arena Soccer League for the 2015–16 season and also planned to form an outdoor team to join the North American Soccer League.

Hartford City FC's ownership group was unable to sign a lease for the XL Center because the city had issues with the group's handling of an outdoor soccer stadium development deal, the legal status of its main financial backer, and other critical issues. The group hoped to reconstruct Dillon Stadium in the South End of Hartford to create a 15,000 seat soccer-only stadium for the 2017 season but the city ended the project in early October 2015 over financial and legal concerns with the group. In July 2017, a U.S. District Court judge found developers James Duckett Jr. and Mitchell Anderson guilty of wire fraud, conspiracy and money laundering.

On October 28, 2015, the MASL announced that Hartford City FC would not be permitted to enter the league that season and began league-wide schedule changes to replace the failed franchise.

In 2016, local restaurateur Aaron Sarwar bought the copyright, trademark and logo for the team and began to build the team from the ground up. In November, the National Premier Soccer League announced that Hartford City FC would join the Atlantic division's White Conference for the 2017 season.

The team played their inaugural game on May 6, 2017, defeating Kingston Stockade FC 3–1 away. Their inaugural game at CCSU Soccer Field took place on May 13, 2017, where HCFC defeated Seacoast United Mariners 2–0. In their first season, the Colts finished 3rd in the White Conference with a 5–3–4 record, which qualified them for the playoffs. In the White Conference Semifinals, the Colts defeated New England rivals Boston City FC 2–1 to reach the White Conference Finals, thanks to an 85th-minute golazo from substitute Paulinton Johnson. They would go on to lose to Kingston Stockade FC 2–1.

The 2018 season saw another third-place finish for HCFC, but they fell short after a 3–0 loss to Brooklyn Italians in the conference semifinal.

2019 was a year of new beginnings yet relative disappointment for the Colts. Head coach Christian Benjamin resigned in the offseason, technical director Nick Balistierri took over, and the club relocated to Al-Marzook Field at the University of Hartford. However, City struggled to string together momentum throughout the season, finishing .500 and out of the playoff picture for the first time in club history. Goalkeeper and club captain Hami Kara announced his retirement at the end of the season.

In 2021, further changes at the club provided an apparent boost on and off the field. Playing at a more intimate TD Bank Oakwood Soccer Park in nearby Portland; City found much success with a heavily rebuilt roster; highlighted by new captain Mark Grant; returnee Louis Beddouri; depth players-turned-stars Cooper Knecht, Noah Silverman, and goalkeeper Evan Dadonna; and newcomers Ben Awashie and Jamis Fite. The Colts finished the regular season with a seven-game unbeaten streak and their first 1st-place finish in club history. City would go on to extend their unbeaten streak in the playoffs. A scheduling conflict at Oakwood led to the Colts' first games at Dillon Stadium, years after their failed attempt to secure it as their permanent home field. HCFC defeated Valeo FC 1–0 in the conference semifinal, launching them to their first conference final in four years. Three days later, the Colts came out on the positive end of a hard-fought, back-and-forth affair against rival Kingston Stockade, avenging their Wooden Shoe loss and capturing their first trophy in club history.

The 2022 season looked to be their most promising yet. Nestled into the renamed Trinity Health Stadium and fully recovered from a first-round exit from the Lamar Hunt U.S. Open Cup, the Colts ran rampant through the North Atlantic Conference schedule. The Colts were led by leading scorer Alec Hughes (8 goals in 11 total matches), goalkeeper Jamis Fite taking over in net full time, the strongest team defense in club history, and a factor the club never truly had before: depth (11 different scorers scored the team's 21 goals). The club finished 8-0-2 in the regular season—highlighted by their first-ever Wooden Shoe (6-1 aggregate)--good for another 1-seed in the conference playoffs and a #3 overall ranking in the NPSL. All of that proved to be meaningless in the end, as City lost the playoff opener at home to the New York Shockers, 2–0. The Shockers went on to win the Conference Final.

In 2023, an inconsistent Colts squad peaked at the perfect time—finishing the season with a four-game unbeaten run and meeting Kingston in the Conference Final for the third time in six seasons. The rubber game of their title match history, in front of a packed crowd at Marist College, went into extra time with both teams goalless. Evan Southern earned a controversial penalty at the edge of the box, and a converted PK by Christian Dionne moved the scoring momentum forward for both teams. Despite a stoppage-time goal by Stockade, City came out on top, 2-1. The Colts would go on to lose the Regional Semifinal to FC Motown in a well-played match, 4-2.

The 2024 season saw an up-and-down first half of the season give way to the best stretch in club history. In the final five games of the season, City earned all 15 available points with five clean sheets (four by Nate DiLoreto, one by Jamis Fite). This unprecedented run of form landed them their second consecutive second-place finish and a home date with newcomers New Jersey United AC in the conference semifinal. Despite a 2-0 deficit in the second half, a Larson Richards goal and a deflected free kick by captain Jake Williams forced extra time, topped off by a dramatic penalty shootout victory. The New York Shockers lay in waiting, and hosted a thrilling final that also finished with a thrilling——albeit controversial——shootout. In the final round, a Colin Goodhines lower-left corner penalty would have forced an additional round, but when the ball bounced out of the net off the supplemental stanchion inside the net, the goalline referee deemed it off the post——ending the Colts’ season in confusion and disappointment. The club filed a protest with the league, which was subsequently denied due to lack of VAR.

== Supporters ==
The Agents of Hale are an independent supporters group, and actually predate the existence of Hartford City. AoH stand in the southern end of the CCSU Soccer Field stands with members traveling in an RV fondly called The Bucket.

AoH and supporters of Elm City Express sponsor a trophy awarded to the winner of the season series between Hartford City and Elm City. The trophy, known to the supporters as "The Big Dumb Whale", is a four-feet-long, 40-pound bull sperm whale carved from white oak. The sperm whale is the official state animal of Connecticut. The white oak is Connecticut's official state tree, and represents the Charter Oak, where, as tradition has it, Connecticut's Royal Charter of 1662 was hidden from the English governor-general. In the competition's inaugural season, Elm City won the series 3–2 on aggregate. In 2018, HCFC took The Whale in the regular season's lone matchup, in a 2–1 win at home. Hartford retained The Whale in 2019, as Elm City Express spent the season on hiatus.

In 2019, the Agents of Hale along with Kingston Stockade FC's Dutch Guard established the Wooden Shoe, a fan cup to be awarded to the winner of the season series between the two teams. The Wooden Shoe pays homage to the Dutch origins of both cities. Stockade FC defeated Hartford City 2–1 on aggregate to win the first Wooden Shoe.

In 2021, Stockade retained the Shoe, winning the series 4–1 on aggregate.

Kicked off with a season-opening, come-from-behind win in Kingston; Hartford City won their first Shoe in 2022, 6–1 on aggregate.

In 2023, Kingston took back the shoe, again winning 4–1 on aggregate.

As of 2024 (Hartford City victory, 4-2 on aggregate), the shoe remains with the Agents, as Stockade FC’s move to The League for Clubs left the two teams without a fixture for the upcoming 2025 season. It is unclear if the clubs intend to schedule any friendlies in the future.

AoH will, however, have an opportunity for supporters hardware in 2025, with the return of NPSL soccer to New Haven in the form of New Haven United FC——marking the return of The Big Dumb Whale after a seven-year hiatus.

== Record ==
=== Year-by-year ===
Year	Division	League	Venue	Record	Regular season	Playoffs	Open Cup
2017	4	NPSL	CCSU Soccer Field	5–3–4	3rd, Atlantic White	Conference Final	Ineligible
2018	4	NPSL	CCSU Soccer Field	6–3–1	3rd, North Atlantic	Conference Semi-Final	DNQ
2019	4	NPSL	Al-Marzook Field	5–5–4	4th, North Atlantic	DNQ	DNQ
2020	4	NPSL	season cancelled due to COVID-19 pandemic				
2021	4	NPSL	TD Bank Oakwood Soccer Park	6–2–2	1st, North Atlantic	Regional Semi-Final	DNQ
2022	4	NPSL	Trinity Health Stadium	8–0–2	1st, North Atlantic	Conference Semi-Final	Round 1
2023	4	NPSL	Trinity Health Stadium	5–3–2	2nd, North Atlantic	Regional Semi-Final	Round 1
2024	4	NPSL	Trinity Health Stadium	7–2–1	2nd, North Atlantic	Conference Final	DNQ
2025	4	NPSL	Trinity Health Stadium	6-2-2	1st, North Atlantic	Conference Final	DNQ
2026	4	Friendlies	Farmington Sports Arena	3-0-1	N/A	N/A	N/A

== Honors ==
National Premier Soccer League (Fourth Division)

- North Atlantic Conference
  - Champions (1): 2021, 2023
