= Virginia Dream FC =

- Full name: Virginia Dream Football Club
- Founded: 2022; 4 years ago
- Stadium: Meridian High School Stadium; Falls Church, Virginia
- Capacity: 2,000
- Owner: Lucas Mendes
- Head Coach: CJ Taylor
- League: National Premier Soccer League
- Website: virginiadreamfc.com
Home colors

Virginia Dream FC is an American soccer club. It currently competes in the Mid-Atlantic Conference of the National Premier Soccer League, considered the fourth tier of the United States soccer league system.

The team's home field is Meridian High School Stadium in Falls Church, Virginia.

== History ==
Virginia Dream FC was founded by 2016 Gatorade National Boys Soccer Player of the Year and former professional player Lucas Mendes in 2022. The team joined the National Premier Soccer League later the same year with plans to debut in the 2023 season. The team's first match was a 2–2 draw on the road against fellow expansion side Greenville United FC on May 6, 2023.

In May 2023, the team was announced as a participant in the inaugural edition of The Soccer Tournament in Cary, North Carolina. Dream was drawn into Group C alongside teams representing Liga MX side Club Necaxa, 13-time Israeli Premier League champion Hapoel Tel Aviv F.C., and SLC FC of Canada. The team lost all three of its group stage matches and failed to advance to the knockout round.

In November 2024, Dream qualified for the U.S. Open Cup for the first time, defeating Aegean Hawks to qualify for the 2025 U.S. Open Cup
