= Moretz Stadium =

Stadium in Hickory, North Carolina, United States

Coordinates: 35.741401°N 81.329387°W

Helen and Leonard Moretz Stadium is an 7,200-seat stadium located in Hickory, North Carolina. It serves as home to the Lenoir-Rhyne University Bears of the South Atlantic Conference. Moretz Stadium is the fourth oldest stadium in continuous use in NCAA Division II and one of the oldest in the country. It was built in 1924. Games played there are said to be played "between the bricks" as the walls separating the seating area from the field are built with brick which was part of the design of the stadium since it opened in 1924.

Moretz Stadium in 2024

The Stadium currently serves as the home field for L-R football as well as its men's and women's lacrosse teams. It and also houses the university's spring commencement exercises. Hickory FC, a member of the National Premier Soccer League plays their home games in the facility. The Lenoir-Rhyne baseball team also used the facility as its home field until a baseball-specific ground was built across the street.

In 1960, it was the site for the NAIA National Semifinal football game, which Lenoir-Rhyne won on its way to their only national championship in school history. Moretz Stadium was also home of a 1962 NAIA National Semifinal game and an NCAA Division II Semifinal game in 2013. The stadium has hosted four NCAA Playoff games in its history, all of which came in either 2012 or 2013. Moretz Stadium will host the NPSL National Semifinal in July 2025. Since 2025 it has become a host site for NCHSAA high school state finals in football, girls' flag football, and lacrosse.

A July 2019 assessment discovered problems with the structural integrity of the home stand. As a result of the findings, the university decided to tear down the stand and replace it with a temporary stand for the 2019 season. A permanent replacement was opened in 2022 as part of a $15 million renovation. The home side stand now includes tip-up stadium seating between the 40-yard lines, a two-level press box with private suites, and new restroom and concession facilities. The renovations also added two video scoreboards (one on each end of the field, rare in Division II), a new sound system, LED floodlights, and premium hospitality areas in the corners of the enclosed end zone.
