= Lubbock Matadors SC =

Soccer club based in Lubbock, Texas

- Founded: November 2021 (4 years ago)
- Stadium: Lowery Field; Lubbock, Texas
- Capacity: 8,471
- Owners: see § Staff
- Manager: Dustin McCorkle
- Coach: David Ormiston
- League: USL League Two
- 2025: National Premier Soccer League; Lone Star Conference: 2nd of 7; Playoffs: Regional finals
- Website: lubbockmatadors.com
Home colours	Away colours

Lubbock Matadors SC is a semi-professional men's soccer club based in Lubbock, Texas. Founded in 2021, it competes in USL League Two, an amateur league in the United States league system. It previously played in the National Premier Soccer League. It plays its home games at the 8,471-capacity Lowery Field.

== History ==
On December 14, 2021, the National Premier Soccer League announced a new expansion team would be placed in Lubbock for the 2022 season. The ownership effort was led by former DC United and FC Dallas front office member Michael Hitchcock, along with Texas Tech alumni Brent McCarty, David Joyner, Eric Cunningham, and Lance Patton.

The Matadors announced Paul Gilbert as the team's first head coach on December 20.

The team's first game was an NPSL matchup against Fort Worth Vaqueros FC on Monday, May 9 at Lowery Field. Their first game of the season ended in a 3–1 loss drawing in 4,239 fans for the first NPSL game in Lubbock.

On Friday May 30, 2025, the Matadors set a franchise record attendance with 6,223 fans in attendance for their home opener of the 2025 season.

Lubbock qualified for its first U.S. Open Cup in 2024 based on its league results from the previous season.

The team's home field returned to Lowery Field in Lubbock after spending their second season at Lubbock-Cooper High School's Pirate Stadium due to renovations to their typical home pitch.

== Stadiums ==
Stadium	Capacity	Location	Year(s)	Notes
Lowery Field	8,471	Lubbock, Texas	2022, 2024–Present	
Lubbock-Cooper Pirate Stadium	5,619	Lubbock, Texas	2023	
LCU Soccer & Track Facility	2,000	Lubbock, Texas	2024	Hosted the First and Second Round of the 109th Lamar Hunt U.S. Open Cup

== Players and staff ==
=== Head coaches ===
Name	Nationality	Tenure	G	W	L	T	Win %
Paul Gilbert	United States	December 21, 2021 – April 16, 2024	27	18	7	2	66.6
Brandon Misuraca	United States	April 17, 2024 – August 16, 2024	10	5	4	1	50.0
David Ormiston	England	February 18, 2025 – June 23, 2026	22	13	7	2	59.1

=== Staff ===
Executive
Owner	(United States) Michael Hitchcock
Owner	(United States) Brent McCarty
Owner/Investor	(United States) David Joyner
Owner/Investor	(United States) Eric Cunningham
Owner/Investor	(United States) Lance Patton
President	(United States) Dustin McCorkle
Community and Event Coordinator	(United States) Cooper Cowan
General Manager	(United States) Thomas Wolf
Account Executive & Ticket Sales	(United States) Tyler Logan
Coaching staff
Manager	(England) David Ormiston
Assistant Coach	Alan Martinez
Assistant Coach	Daniel De Mello
Goalkeeper Coach	Diego Berlingeri

== Club culture ==
=== Mascot ===
The Mascot of the Lubbock Matadors is a bull named Notorious. He was officially unveiled on February 25, 2023 at the Two Docs Brewing Company, the main kit sponsor for the Matadors. Notorious has since been a key part of the marketing efforts for the Matadors both at games and at different events throughout the community.

=== Supporters ===
The Lubbock Matadors' officially recognized supporters group is the Mozos. The group consists of fans that play different instruments, have chants and songs prepared for throughout the game, and smoke bombs that go off following a Matadors Goal.

=== Rivalries ===
The Lubbock Matadors' main rivalry is with West Texas FC in El Dustico. The two teams compete for the Golden Tumbleweed, symbolic of the two teams - who are separated by just 118 miles. On February 18, 2025 the rivalry grew more intense as the Matadors signed manager David Ormiston away from West Texas F.C. following their Lone Star Conference Championship.

== Record ==
=== Year-by-year ===
Season	League											Position		Playoffs	U.S. Open Cup
Season	League	Conference	Pld	W	L	D	GF	GA	GD	Pts	PPG	Conf.	Overall	Playoffs	U.S. Open Cup
**2022**	NPSL	Lone Star	12	6	4	2	25	15	+10	20	1.66	6th	36th	DNQ	DNE
**2023**	NPSL	Lone Star	11	10	1	0	36	8	+28	30	2.72	1st	3rd	Conference Finals	DNE
**2024**	NPSL	Lone Star	10	5	4	1	22	19	+3	16	1.60	5th	41st	DNQ	Third Round
**2025**	NPSL	Lone Star	12	9	2	1	28	9	+19	22	2.20	2nd	13th	Region Finals	DNE
**2026**	USL2	Ranger	12	3	7	2	14	16	-2	11	0.92	5th			
Total			56	33	13	11	137	70	+67	98	1.75				

=== Top all-time goalscorers ===
As of 23 May 2026
Active player name(s) in bold

#	Name	Career	USL 2	NPSL	NPSL Playoffs	U.S. Open Cup	Total
1	Pablo Diez	2022–2024	0	15	2	0	17
2	**Momo Diop**	**2025–Present**	7	7	0	0	14
3	Ethan Giwa-McNeil	2023	0	7	2	0	9
3	Luke Jones	2022–2023	0	9	0	0	9
5	**Jack Thomas**	**2025-Present**	0	7	1	0	8
6	Evan Howard	2024–2025	0	7	0	0	7
7	Markus Krogstad	2023	0	5	0	0	5
7	Mitar Mitrovic	2023	0	5	0	0	5
7	**Pablo Torre**	**2025–Present**	1	1	4	0	5
10	Francesco Pettinaroli	2024	0	4	0	0	4
10	Saad Faiz	2024	0	4	0	0	4
10	**Theo Buttersworth**	**2025–Present**	1	1	3	0	4

== Honors ==
=== NPSL ===
- Lone Star Conference Regular Season Champions: 2023
- Lone Star Conference Champions: 2025
