= Appalachian FC =

Soccer club based in Boone, North Carolina

- Founded: 2020 (6 years ago)
- Stadium: ASU Soccer Stadium; Boone, North Carolina
- Capacity: 2,000
- Coach: Tom Gillette
- League: USL League Two
- 2025: NPSL, 2nd of 8 (Southeast Conf.); Playoffs: Conference finals
- Website: appalachianfc.com
Home colors

Appalachian FC is a semi-professional men's soccer club based in Boone, North Carolina. Owned by a consortium of various organisations and individuals, the club was founded by former Appalachian State men's soccer coach Jason O'Keefe and businessman Michael Hitchcock in the aftermath of the program's discontinuation in May 2020. It played its first five seasons in the National Premier Soccer League, and currently competes in USL League Two, both amateur leagues in the United States league system. It plays its home games at the ASU Soccer Stadium.

== History ==
On May 26, 2020, Appalachian State discontinued varsity sports including men's soccer due to the financial impact of the COVID-19 pandemic. As a result of the men's soccer team being cut, head coach Jason O'Keefe and a soccer executive Michael Hitchcock joined up with a group of local business owners to create the team.

On November 18, 2020, Appalachian FC joined the National Premier Soccer League (NPSL), considered the fourth tier of the United States soccer pyramid and roughly equal to USL League Two. Appalachian FC played their first game on May 1, 2021, ending in a 1–1 draw with Metro Louisville FC. Appalachian FC finished the 2021 season third in their conference and advanced to the Southeast Conference playoffs. They finished the season with a 2–1 loss to Georgia Storm in the semifinals on July 14, 2021.

In just their second season, Appalachian FC finished the 2022 regular season as the #1 seed in the Southeast Conference playoffs. Appalachian FC would ride that momentum through the playoffs, winning the Southeast Conference championship 6-2 against North Alabama Soccer Coalition on July 16, 2022. Appalachian FC would go on to win their 2022 NPSL East Region semifinal matchup 2-1 against the Alexandria Reds before falling to Keystone Conference and eventual National Champion, FC Motown 3-0. Head Coach, Dale Parker, would earn NPSL Coach of the Year honors as a result of the team's 2022 campaign.

As a result of their success in 2022, Appalachian FC earned a berth into the 2023 Lamar Hunt U.S. Open Cup tournament. On March 22, 2023, Appalachian FC would make club history earning their first U.S. Open Cup victory against NC Fusion U-23s. The contest would remain tied through stoppage and extra time before ultimately being decided by penalty kicks. Appalachian FC's U.S. Open Cup run would end in the second round at the hands of USL League One side, Charlotte Independence

In 2026, Appalachian FC moved to USL League Two for its inaugural season in the league.

== Colors and crest ==
The club colors are black and gold. The club crest was designed by award-winning designer Christopher Payne, who has developed brand identities for several football clubs in the United States and the United Kingdom including Lexington SC, Flower City Union, Monterey Bay FC, and Eastleigh Football Club. The crest draws inspiration from the cryptozoological mythology and folklore of Sasquatch sightings in North Carolina and across the Appalachian Mountains.

== Seasons ==
List of Appalachian FC seasons
Season	League	Pld	W	D	L	GF	GA	GD	Pos	Playoffs	USOC
2021	NPSL	10	4	4	2	16	12	+4	3rd	Conference semi-finals	N/A
2022	NPSL	10	6	3	1	25	12	+13	1st	Regional finals	DNQ
2023	NPSL	10	5	2	3	21	16	+5	2nd	Conference semi-finals	Second round
2024	NPSL	10	8	2	0	25	7	+18	1st	Conference finals	DNQ
2025	NPSL	10	7	0	3	25	11	+14	2nd	Conference semi-finals	First round
2026	USL2	14	8	4	2	30	13	+17	3rd	Conference semi-finals	DNQ

== See also ==
- List of United Soccer League clubs
