= Dakota Fusion FC =

- Full name: Dakota Fusion Futbol Club
- Founded: February 1, 2016; 10 years ago
- Stadium: Jim Gotta Stadium; Moorhead, Minnesota
- Capacity: 3,000
- Chairman: Sajid Ghauri
- Head Coach: Kristoff Burkett
- League: NPSL
- Website: http://www.dakotafusionfc.com/

Dakota Fusion FC is a semi-professional soccer team based in Fargo–Moorhead. They have played in the National Premier Soccer League since May 2017 and the Women's Premier Soccer League since 2018. They have announced intent to begin play in the division 3 women's professional league WPSL PRO in 2026. The team colors are black and yellow.

== History ==
Dakota Fusion FC was announced as a National Premier Soccer League expansion team on December 17, 2016. On the day of the announcement, the leadership group was announced: chairman Joe Barone, general manager, Sajid Ghauri and team administration Rollie Bulock.

The team announced that they would be playing at two stadiums in the Fargo–Moorhead region on a rotating basis. Half of the Fusion's games would be played in Fargo at Sid Cichy Stadium while the other half would be played in Moorhead, Minnesota at Moorhead High School, but they ended up playing all the home games in 2016 and 2017 in Minnesota.

The first season was an eventful one for Coach Jim Robbins's team. They finished second in the NPSL North Conference and lost a playoff game (having taken the lead) on the road at Detroit City FC in Hamtramck, MI. The team's leading goalscorer, Jade Johnson of West Fargo High School and the University of Jamestown, came second in the Golden Boot (for leading goalscorer) and won the Golden Ball (for best player). In November 2017, Fusion announced the formation of a team in WPSL, to begin play in May 2018.

In 2023, the men's team led by Samuel Winning finished second in the North Conference again and secured a first ever home play-off game, the Conference Semifinal, against third-placed Med City FC from Rochester, MN. Yu Tsukanome finished with the Golden Boot and secured a contract with MLS Next Pro professional side Tacoma Defiance, the reserve team of Seattle Sounders FC.

== Staff ==
Position	Staff
Owner, General Manager	Sajid Ghauri
Director of Operations	Beth Garten
Men's Head Coach	Kristoff Burkett
Women's Head Coach	Jon Melendez

Last updated: July 6, 2023
Source: "Staff". Dakota Fusion Soccer.
