= 2022 U.S. Open Cup =

107th edition of cup competition in American soccer

2022 Lamar Hunt U.S. Open Cup
Tournament details
- Country: United States
- Dates: March 22 – September 7
- Teams: 103

Final positions
- Champions: Orlando City SC (1st title)
- Runners-up: Sacramento Republic FC
- 2023 CONCACAF Champions League: Orlando City SC

Tournament statistics
- Matches played: 87
- Goals scored: 283 (3.25 per match)
- Top goal scorer(s): Rodrigo López; Lucky Mkosana; Facundo Torres (4 goals each)

Awards
- Best player: Rodrigo López

The 2022 Lamar Hunt U.S. Open Cup was the 107th edition of the U.S. Open Cup, a knockout cup competition in American soccer. After the 2020 and 2021 competitions were suspended and ultimately canceled due to the COVID-19 pandemic, the United States Soccer Federation announced that the 2022 edition would run from March to mid-September of that year. The 2022 field features 103 clubs, 71 of them fully professional—both modern-era records.

On December 22, 2021, U.S. Soccer announced the final format for the 2022 tournament, with two major changes from prior editions. First, all eligible Division II and Division III professional teams entered the second round. Second, Major League Soccer had their teams entry staggered: Seventeen MLS teams entered the Third Round, and the remaining eight teams (the four playing in the 2022 CONCACAF Champions League, and the next highest two teams in both the Eastern and Western Conferences) entered the Round of 32.

For the first time since 2017, multiple leagues from the same division competed in the Open Cup. USL League One, of Division III, competed alongside teams from MLS Next Pro and the National Independent Soccer Association (NISA). NISA was set to make its Open Cup debut in 2020, before that tournament was canceled; MLS Next Pro was established in 2021, and while primarily a developmental league for MLS teams, its independent clubs are eligible for the Open Cup.

Atlanta United FC was the defending champion, when Atlanta won the 2019 tournament, but was eliminated in the Round of 32 by Nashville SC.

Orlando City SC won their first Open Cup title, defeating Sacramento Republic FC 3–0 in the final.

== Schedule ==
Schedule for 2022 Lamar Hunt U.S. Open Cup
Round	Draw date	Match day	Entrants	Teams entered to date
First round	February 2, 2022	March 22–23, 2022	11 teams from local qualification 2021 National Amateur Cup Champion; 10 NPSL teams 10 USL2 teams	32
Second round	February 11, 2022	April 5–7, 2022	16 winners from First Round; 23 USL Championship teams 2 MLS Next Pro teams 10 NISA teams 11 USL League One teams	78
Third round	April 8, 2022	April 19–20, 2022	31 winners from Second Round; 17 MLS teams	95
Round of 32	April 21, 2022	May 10–11, 2022	24 winners from Third Round; 8 MLS teams	103
Round of 16	May 12, 2022	May 24–25, 2022	16 winners from Round of 32	103
Quarterfinals	May 12, 2022	June 21–22, 2022	8 winners from Round of 16	103
Semifinals	June 23, 2022	July 27, 2022	4 winners from Quarterfinals	103
Final	June 23, 2022	September 7, 2022	2 winners from Semifinals	103

== Teams ==
Pro teams that are majority-owned or controlled by higher division professional clubs are barred from entering the competition. For this edition of the tournament, there are 21 such teams: Atlanta United 2 (USLC), LA Galaxy II (USLC), Loudoun United FC (USLC), New York Red Bulls II (USLC), and 17 out of 19 MLS Next Pro teams. The two MLS Next Pro teams entering are Rochester New York FC (independent club) and St. Louis City 2 (the club's senior team does not debut until the 2023 season).

=== Table ===
**Enter in First Round**		**Enter in Second Round**		**Enter in Third Round**	**Enter in Round of 32**
**Open Division**		**Division III**	**Division II**	**Division I**	
**USCS/USASA/USSSA/ANFEEU**; 12 teams	**NPSL/USL2**; 20 teams	**MLS Next Pro/NISA/USL1**; 23 teams	**USL Championship**; 23 teams	**MLS**; 25 teams	
National Amateur Cup: Lansdowne Yonkers FC (EPSL); Local Qualifiers: Azteca FC (Colo SL); Brockton FC United (BSSL); City Soccer FC (NSL); Contra Costa FC (NPSL); D'Feeters Kicks Soccer Club (RL); Escondido FC (UPSL); Lynchburg FC (UPSL); Northern Virginia FC (EPSL); Orlando FC Wolves (NSL); Oyster Bay United FC (UPSL); San Fernando Valley FC (UPSL)	NPSL: Cleveland SC; Denton Diablos FC; Georgia Revolution FC; Hartford City FC; Las Vegas Legends; Miami United FC; Minneapolis City SC; FC Motown $; Southern States Soccer Club; Tulsa Athletic; USL2: Chicago FC United; Des Moines Menace; North Carolina Fusion U23; Ocean City Nor'easters; Park City Red Wolves SC; Portland Timbers U23s; South Carolina United; The Villages SC; West Chester United SC; Western Mass Pioneers	MLS Next Pro: Rochester New York FC; St. Louis City 2; NISA: Albion San Diego; Bay Cities FC; California United Strikers FC; Chattanooga FC; Flower City Union; Los Angeles Force; Maryland Bobcats FC; Michigan Stars FC; AC Syracuse Pulse; Valley United FC; USL1: Central Valley Fuego FC; Charlotte Independence; Chattanooga Red Wolves SC; Forward Madison FC; Greenville Triumph SC; North Carolina FC; Northern Colorado Hailstorm FC; Richmond Kickers; South Georgia Tormenta FC; FC Tucson; Union Omaha $	Birmingham Legion FC; Charleston Battery; Colorado Springs Switchbacks FC; Detroit City FC; El Paso Locomotive FC; Hartford Athletic; Indy Eleven; Las Vegas Lights FC; Louisville City FC; Memphis 901 FC; Miami FC; Monterey Bay FC; New Mexico United; Oakland Roots SC; Orange County SC; Phoenix Rising FC; Pittsburgh Riverhounds SC; Rio Grande Valley FC; Sacramento Republic FC $$; San Antonio FC; San Diego Loyal SC; Tampa Bay Rowdies; FC Tulsa	Atlanta United FC; Austin FC; Charlotte FC; Chicago Fire FC; FC Cincinnati; Columbus Crew; D.C. United; FC Dallas; Houston Dynamo FC; Inter Miami CF; Los Angeles FC; LA Galaxy; Minnesota United FC; New York Red Bulls; Orlando City SC $$$; Real Salt Lake; San Jose Earthquakes	Colorado Rapids; Nashville SC; New England Revolution; New York City FC; Philadelphia Union; Portland Timbers; Seattle Sounders FC; Sporting Kansas City

- **Bold** denotes team is still active in the tournament.
- $: Winner of $25,000 bonus for advancing the furthest in the competition from their respective divisions.
- $$: Winner of $100,000 for being the runner-up in the competition.
- $$$: Winner of $300,000 for winning the competition.

=== Map ===
Locations of teams in the tournament proper.
- MLS
- USLC
- Division 3 (MLS Next Pro/NISA/USL1)
- Open Division (NPSL/USL2)
- Local Qualifiers & National Amateur Cup Champion
- Multiple Teams

Metro areas with multiple teams:
Atlanta: Atlanta United FC (MLS), Georgia Revolution FC (NPSL)
Boston: New England Revolution (MLS), Brockton FC United (Local)
Charlotte: Charlotte FC (MLS), Charlotte Independence (USL1)
Chattanooga: Chattanooga FC (NISA), Chattanooga Red Wolves SC (USL1)
Chicago: Chicago Fire FC (MLS), Chicago FC United (USL2)
Dallas: FC Dallas (MLS), Denton Diablos FC (NPSL), D'Feeters Kicks Soccer Club (Local)
Denver: Colorado Rapids (MLS), Azteca FC (Local)
Detroit: Detroit City FC (USLC), Michigan Stars FC (NISA)
Hartford: Hartford Athletic (USLC), Hartford City FC (NPSL)
Las Vegas: Las Vegas Lights FC (USLC), Las Vegas Legends (NPSL)
Los Angeles: Los Angeles FC (MLS), LA Galaxy (MLS), Orange County SC (USLC), California United Strikers FC (NISA), Los Angeles Force (NISA), San Fernando Valley FC (Local)
Miami: Inter Miami CF (MLS), Miami FC (USLC), Miami United FC (NPSL)
Minneapolis/St. Paul: Minnesota United FC (MLS), Minneapolis City SC (NPSL)
New York City: New York City FC (MLS), New York Red Bulls (MLS), FC Motown (NPSL), Lansdowne Yonkers FC (Local), Oyster Bay United FC (Local)
Orlando: Orlando City SC (MLS), Orlando FC Wolves (Local)
Philadelphia: Philadelphia Union (MLS), West Chester United SC (USL2)
Phoenix: Phoenix Rising FC (USLC), Valley United FC (NISA)
Rochester: Rochester New York FC (MLS Next Pro), Flower City Union (NISA)
San Diego: San Diego Loyal SC (USLC), Albion San Diego (NISA)
San Francisco Bay Area: San Jose Earthquakes (MLS), Oakland Roots SC (USLC), Bay Cities FC (NISA), Contra Costa FC (Local)
Tulsa: FC Tulsa (USLC), Tulsa Athletic (NPSL)

Washington, D.C.: D.C. United (MLS), Northern Virginia FC (Local)

=== Number of teams by state ===
A total of 35 states and the District of Columbia are represented by clubs in the U.S. Open Cup this year.

	States	Number	Teams
1	California	16	Albion San Diego, Bay Cities FC, California United Strikers FC, Central Valley Fuego FC, Contra Costa FC, Escondido FC, LA Galaxy, Los Angeles FC, Los Angeles Force, Monterey Bay FC, Oakland Roots SC, Orange County SC, Sacramento Republic FC, San Diego Loyal SC, San Fernando Valley FC, San Jose Earthquakes
2	Florida	8	City Soccer FC, Inter Miami CF, Miami FC, Miami United FC, Orlando City SC, Orlando FC Wolves, Tampa Bay Rowdies, The Villages SC
2	Texas	8	Austin FC, FC Dallas, Denton Diablos FC, D'Feeters Kicks SC, El Paso Locomotive FC, Houston Dynamo, Rio Grande Valley FC, San Antonio FC
4	New York	6	AC Syracuse Pulse, Flower City Union, Lansdowne Yonkers FC, New York City FC, Oyster Bay FC United, Rochester New York FC
5	Colorado	4	Azteca FC, Colorado Rapids, Colorado Springs Switchbacks FC, Northern Colorado Hailstorm FC
5	North Carolina	4	Charlotte FC, Charlotte Independence, North Carolina FC, North Carolina Fusion U23
5	Tennessee	4	Chattanooga FC, Chattanooga Red Wolves SC, Memphis 901 FC, Nashville SC
8	Arizona	3	Phoenix Rising FC, FC Tucson, Valley United FC
8	Georgia	3	Atlanta United FC, Georgia Revolution FC, South Georgia Tormenta FC
8	Massachusetts	3	Brockton FC United, New England Revolution, Western Mass Pioneers
8	New Jersey	3	FC Motown, New York Red Bulls, Ocean City Nor'easters
8	Ohio	3	FC Cincinnati, Cleveland SC, Columbus Crew
8	Pennsylvania	3	Philadelphia Union, Pittsburgh Riverhounds SC, West Chester United SC
8	South Carolina	3	Charleston Battery, Greenville Triumph SC, SC United Bantams
8	Virginia	3	Lynchburg FC, Northern Virginia FC, Richmond Kickers
16	Connecticut	2	Hartford Athletic, Hartford City FC
16	Illinois	2	Chicago FC United, Chicago Fire FC
16	Michigan	2	Detroit City FC, Michigan Stars FC
16	Minnesota	2	Minnesota United FC, Minneapolis City SC
16	Oklahoma	2	FC Tulsa, Tulsa Athletic
16	Oregon	2	Portland Timbers, Portland Timbers U23s
16	Nevada	2	Las Vegas Lights FC, Las Vegas Legends
16	Utah	2	Park City Red Wolves SC, Real Salt Lake
24	Alabama	1	Birmingham Legion FC
24	District of Columbia	1	D.C. United
24	Indiana	1	Indy Eleven
24	Iowa	1	Des Moines Menace
24	Kansas	1	Sporting Kansas City
24	Kentucky	1	Louisville City FC
24	Maryland	1	Maryland Bobcats FC
24	Mississippi	1	Southern States Soccer Club
24	Missouri	1	St. Louis City 2
24	Nebraska	1	Union Omaha
24	New Mexico	1	New Mexico United
24	Washington	1	Seattle Sounders FC
24	Wisconsin	1	Forward Madison FC

States without a team in the Open Cup: Alaska, Arkansas, Delaware, Hawaii, Idaho, Louisiana, Maine, Montana, New Hampshire, North Dakota, Rhode Island, South Dakota, Vermont, West Virginia, and Wyoming.

=== Open Cup debuts ===
31 teams played in their first Open Cup tournament in 2022.

- MLS: Austin FC, Charlotte FC, Inter Miami CF
- USLC: Monterey Bay FC, Oakland Roots SC, Rio Grande Valley FC Toros, San Diego Loyal SC
- MLS Next Pro: St. Louis City 2
- NISA: Albion San Diego, AC Syracuse Pulse, Bay Cities FC, California United Strikers FC, Flower City Union, Los Angeles Force, Maryland Bobcats FC, Michigan Stars FC, Valley United FC
- USL1: Central Valley Fuego FC, Northern Colorado Hailstorm FC, Union Omaha
- NPSL: Cleveland SC, Denton Diablos FC, Southern States Soccer Club, Las Vegas Legends
- USL2: Minneapolis City SC, Park City Red Wolves SC
- UPSL: Escondido FC, Lynchburg FC, Oyster Bay United FC, San Fernando Valley FC
- Other Open Division: Brockton FC United, D'Feeters Kicks SC

Due to their league's scheduling, Northern Colorado Hailstorm FC's 1-0 victory in the Second Round was the first time in the U.S. Open Cup's modern era that a club recorded their first-ever competitive match, goal, and victory in the Open Cup.

== Format ==
=== Draws ===
- No team who was playing their first Open Cup match was paired with another team also playing their first Open Cup match. An exception was made if there were no other teams that were geographically close in order to prevent excess travel.
- Random pairings were done in cases where three or more teams were from the same general area.
- In cases where a geographical fit didn't exist, a random selection occurred.
- Pairings between clubs and their parent clubs, clubs with shared ownership, or other clubs using the same technical resources was avoided in geographic selections and random pairings until the final. For 2022, these pairings included: Los Angeles FC (MLS) and Las Vegas Lights (USLC), Portland Timbers (MLS) and Portland Timbers U23 (USL2), Chattanooga Red Wolves SC (USL1) and Park City Red Wolves SC (USL2).

=== Matches ===
- Single-game-knockout format with two 45-minute halves and stoppage time.
- Tied matches are sent to two 15-minute extra time halves with stoppage time.
- Matches tied after extra time will be settled with a penalty shootout.
- Home teams are determined by a random selection among teams that apply to host. Teams that meet minimum tournament standards will be given priority over others in their pairing.
- Five substitutions during regulation time over three substitution windows and halftime.
- One extra substitution added during extra time. This substitution can be made at the end of regulation, over an additional substitution window, or at extra time halftime.
- Up to two extra substitutions over two extra substitution windows will be available in the case of a concussion. If a team uses this concussion substitution, the opposing team gains an additional substitution and substitution window.

== First and Second rounds ==
In the First round, teams (local, National Amateur Cup, NPSL, & USL2) were paired in a geographical manner, pitting teams closer together against each other. Once the First round pairings were made those pairings were matched with a Division II (USLC) or a Division III (MLS Next Pro, NISA, or USL1) team in a geographical manner for the Second round. Division II & III teams that remained unmatched were matched together, again geographically, avoiding any same-division matching (e.g., no II vs II or III vs III).

The complete draw for the First round, including match dates and times, was announced on February 2, 2022. Draws for the Second round were announced on February 11; match dates and times were announced on February 28.

=== Bracket ===
First round March 22–23
**NPSL**	**FC Motown**	**1**
USL2	West Chester United SC	0
NPSL	Hartford City FC	0
**LQ**	**Oyster Bay United FC**	**3**
USL2	South Carolina United	0
**USL2**	**North Carolina Fusion U23**	**1**
**USL2**	**The Villages SC**	**6**
LQ	Orlando FC Wolves	0
NPSL	Denton Diablos FC	2
**LQ**	**D'Feeters Kicks Soccer Club**	**3**
**NPSL**	**Southern States Soccer Club**	**3**
NPSL	Georgia Revolution FC	1
**LQ**	**San Fernando Valley FC**	**6**
LQ	Escondido FC	2
LQ	Lynchburg FC	1
**LQ**	**Northern Virginia FC**	**3**
USL2	Ocean City Nor'easters	1 (3)
**NAC**	**Lansdowne Yonkers FC**	**1 (4)**
**NPSL**	**Cleveland SC**	**2***
USL2	Chicago FC United	1
**NPSL**	**Miami United FC**	**3**
LQ	City Soccer FC	1
**USL2**	**Western Mass Pioneers**	**2**
LQ	Brockton FC United	0
**USL2**	**Des Moines Menace**	**3**
NPSL	Minneapolis City SC	2
**NPSL**	**Tulsa Athletic**	**3**
LQ	Azteca FC	0
**USL2**	**Portland Timbers U23s**	**2**
LQ	Contra Costa FC	1
**NPSL**	**Las Vegas Legends**	**3**
USL2	Park City Red Wolves SC	2

Second round April 5–7
NISA	AC Syracuse Pulse	0
**NPSL**	**FC Motown**	**1***
NISA	Albion San Diego	1
**USLC**	**San Diego Loyal SC**	**2**
**USLC**	**Hartford Athletic**	**3**
LQ	Oyster Bay United FC	1
**NISA**	**Bay Cities FC**	**2**
USLC	Monterey Bay FC	1
USL1	Charlotte Independence	2
**USL2**	**North Carolina Fusion U23**	**4**
USLC	Charleston Battery	0
**USL1**	**South Georgia Tormenta FC**	**1**
**USLC**	**Tampa Bay Rowdies**	**6**
USL2	The Villages SC	0
**NISA**	**Chattanooga FC**	**3**
USLC	Memphis 901 FC	1
**USLC**	**San Antonio FC**	**3**
LQ	D'Feeters Kicks Soccer Club	1
USLC	Colorado Springs Switchbacks FC	0
**USL1**	**Northern Colorado Hailstorm FC**	**1***
**USLC**	**Birmingham Legion FC**	**2**
NPSL	Southern States Soccer Club	1
**USLC**	**Detroit City FC**	**3**
NISA	Michigan Stars FC	0
**NISA**	**California United Strikers FC**	**5**
LQ	San Fernando Valley FC	0
USLC	El Paso Locomotive FC	1
**USL1**	**Central Valley Fuego FC**	**4**
**USL1**	**Richmond Kickers**	**1**
LQ	Northern Virginia FC	0
**USL1**	**FC Tucson**	**3**
USLC	Las Vegas Lights FC	2
**MLSNP**	**Rochester New York FC**	**1**
NAC	Lansdowne Yonkers FC	0
**USL1**	**Greenville Triumph SC**	**2**
USLC	Oakland Roots SC	0
**USL1**	**Forward Madison FC**	**3**
NPSL	Cleveland SC	0
**USLC**	**Louisville City FC**	**1**
USL1	Chattanooga Red Wolves SC	0
**USLC**	**Miami FC**	**3**
NPSL	Miami United FC	0
USL1	North Carolina FC	1
**USLC**	**Rio Grande Valley FC**	**2**
**NISA**	**Flower City Union**	**1***
USL2	Western Mass Pioneers	0
**USLC**	**Orange County SC**	**5**
NISA	Los Angeles Force	2
**USL1**	**Union Omaha**	**2**
USL2	Des Moines Menace	1
**USLC**	**Phoenix Rising FC**	**1***
NISA	Valley United FC	0
**USLC**	**FC Tulsa**	**2**
NPSL	Tulsa Athletic	1
**USLC**	**Pittsburgh Riverhounds SC**	**2**
NISA	Maryland Bobcats FC	0
**USLC**	**Sacramento Republic FC**	**6**
USL2	Portland Timbers U23s	0
**MLSNP**	**St. Louis City 2**	**2**
USLC	Indy Eleven	0
**USLC**	**New Mexico United**	**5**
NPSL	Las Vegas Legends	0

Host team listed first
Bold = winner
* = after extra time, ( ) = penalty shootout score

=== First round ===
All times local to game site.

March 22	**Cleveland SC (NPSL) (Ohio)**	**2–1** (a.e.t.)	**(Illinois)** Chicago FC United (USL2)	Berea, Ohio
7:15 pm EDT	Michael Derezic 90'; Vinny Bell 107'	Report	Mounir Alami 17'	Stadium: George Finnie Stadium; Attendance: 250; Referee: Austin Saini

March 22	Hartford City FC (NPSL) **(Connecticut)**	**0–3**	**(New York (state)) Oyster Bay United FC (LQ)**	Hartford, Connecticut
7:30 pm EDT		Report	Junior Rosero 16'; Franco Paz 32'; Sebastián Ruiz 45+2'	Stadium: Trinity Health Stadium; Attendance: 200; Referee: Jeremy Scheer

March 22	**The Villages SC (USL2) (Florida)**	**6–0**	**(Florida)** Orlando FC Wolves (LQ)	Summerfield, Florida
7:30 pm EDT	Juan Felipe Rojas 12'; Rafael Vacas Barba 21', 63'; Daniel Farias de Oliveira 41'; Jose Victor Rua France 57'; Payton Rausch 84'	Report		Stadium: The Villages SC Complex; Attendance: 225; Referee: Wesley Costa

March 22	Denton Diablos FC (NPSL) **(Texas)**	**2–3**	**(Texas) D'Feeters Kicks Soccer Club (LQ)**	Denton, Texas
7:30 pm CDT	Julio Vargas 10'; Brandon Cerda 40'; Alejandro Estrada (red card) 70'; Carlos Flores (red card) 90+2'	Report	Sebastian Mendez 24'; Miles Byass 32'; Steven Chavez 45'; Adrian Renteria (red card) 54'	Stadium: Mean Green Soccer Stadium; Attendance: 100; Referee: Gloria Resendiz

March 22	**Southern States SC (NPSL) (Mississippi)**	**3–1**	**(Georgia (U.S. state))** Georgia Revolution FC (NPSL)	Hattiesburg, Mississippi
7:30 pm CDT	Jean Rivera 26'; Thomas Roy Shepherd 65', 73'	Report	Karim Tmimi 82'	Stadium: The Oakes; Attendance: 300; Referee: Muhammad Hassan

March 23	**San Fernando Valley FC (LQ) (California)**	**6–2**	**(California)** Escondido FC (LQ)	Encino, California
2:45 pm PDT	Tomas Bosuel 29', 62', 68'; Irvin Rivas 43'; Giancarlo Ponciano 47'; Ramiro Hermida 90'	Report	David A. Martín 45' (pen.), 79'	Stadium: Sepulveda Basin Sports Complex; Attendance: 100; Referee: Trevor Wiseman

March 23	Ocean City Nor'easters (USL2) **(New Jersey)**	**1–1** (a.e.t.) (**3–4** p)	**(New York (state)) Lansdowne Yonkers FC (NAC)**	Ocean City, New Jersey
7:00 pm EDT	Pablo Da Silva Marquez 8', (red card) 118'		Shamir Mullings 12'	Stadium: Carey Stadium; Attendance: 110
	**Penalties**
	Adam Sternberger (penalty scored); Kevin Curran (penalty missed); Emanuel de Jesus Teixeira (penalty missed); Nico Tramontana (penalty scored); Kyle Galloway (penalty scored); Leandro Tiago Louro da Silva (penalty missed)		Andrew Sousa (penalty scored); Joseph Devivo (penalty scored); Yohance Alexander (penalty missed); Kyle Parish (penalty scored); Johan Mauritzson (penalty missed); Shamir Mullings (penalty scored)

March 23	South Carolina United FC (USL2) **(South Carolina)**	**0–1**	**North Carolina Fusion U23 (USL2)**	Columbia, South Carolina
7:30 pm EDT				Stadium: SEFL Soccer Complex
Note: South Carolina United forfeited the match after failing a pregame roster check, and the official result is a 1–0 win for North Carolina Fusion. The two teams elected to play a friendly, which ended in a 3–1 (aet) win for North Carolina.

March 23	**Miami United FC (NPSL) (Florida)**	**3–1**	**(Florida)** City Soccer FC (LQ)	Hialeah, Florida
7:30 pm EDT	Robertino Insúa 79'; Lucas Espindola 83', 90+5' (pen.)		Oscar E. Reyes 82'	Stadium: Ted Hendricks Stadium; Attendance: 100

March 23	**Western Mass Pioneers (USL2) (Massachusetts)**	**2–0**	**(Massachusetts)** Brockton FC United (LQ)	Ludlow, Massachusetts
7:30 pm EDT	Gabriel Vitalino Ganzer 48'; Joshua Calderón (red card) 71'; Jacob Mannix 90+5'		Rudney Delgado (red card) 44'	Stadium: Lusitano Stadium; Attendance: 200

March 23	**Des Moines Menace (USL2) (Iowa)**	**4–2**	**(Minnesota)** Minneapolis City SC (NPSL)	West Des Moines, Iowa
7:00 pm CDT	Maximiliano Galizzi 38'; William De Jesus Rodrigues 57'; Alessandro Salvadego 68', 78'		Lionel Vang 20'; Loïc Mesanvi 61'	Stadium: Valley Stadium; Attendance: 150

March 23	**Tulsa Athletic (NPSL) (Oklahoma)**	**3–0**	**(Colorado)** Azteca FC (LQ)	Tulsa, Oklahoma
7:00 pm CDT	Aaron Ugbah 25'; Joseph Garcia 72' (pen.); Ruben Torres 75'		Cesar Meza (red card) 79'	Stadium: Case Soccer Complex at ORU; Attendance: 350

March 23	**Portland Timbers U23s (USL2) (Oregon)**	**2–1**	**(California)** Contra Costa FC (LQ)	Salem, Oregon
7:00 pm PDT	Thomas Petersen 51'; Eduardo Sanchez 51'		Roberto González 90+2'	Stadium: John Chambers Field; Attendance: 500

March 23	**Las Vegas Legends (NPSL) (Nevada)**	**3–2**	**(Utah)** Park City Red Wolves SC (USL2)	Las Vegas, Nevada
7:00 pm PDT	Samuel Aina 10'; Brandon Vargas 34'; Roberto Soto 68'		Leonardo Fuchs 84'; Kevin Jara-Collante 90+2'	Stadium: Peter Johanan Soccer Field at UNLV; Attendance: 724

March 30	Lynchburg FC (LQ) **(Virginia)**	**1–3**	**Northern Virginia FC (LQ)**	Lynchburg, Virginia
7:30 pm EDT	Mitch Reed 25'; Bhayle Kearns (red card) 90+2'		Luke Campbell 13'; Jean-Philippe Ayolmbong 48'; Jhonny De Souza 85' (pen.) (red card) 90+3'	Stadium: Lynchburg City Stadium; Attendance: 254

April 1	**FC Motown (NPSL) (New Jersey)**	**1–0**	**(Pennsylvania)** West Chester United SC (USL2)	Montclair, New Jersey
7:00 pm EDT	Ryan Peterson 90+1'			Stadium: MSU Soccer Park; Attendance: 176
Note: Match was originally played March 22 and resulted in a 2–3 (aet) win for West Chester. FC Motown lodged a protest, citing an illegal substitute made by West Chester, and won. The first result was nullified and the match will be replayed in its entirety.

=== Second round ===
All times local to game site.

April 5	Charlotte Independence (USL1) **(North Carolina)**	**2–4**	**North Carolina Fusion U23 (USL2)**	Charlotte, North Carolina
7:00 pm EDT	Dutey 14'; Páez 41'; Mbuyu (red card) 70'	Report	Luis Neto 37'; João da Silva 51'; Marriott 88'; William Lorentz 90+5'	Stadium: American Legion Memorial Stadium; Referee: John Rush

April 5	**Pittsburgh Riverhounds SC (USLC) (Pennsylvania)**	**2–0**	**(Maryland)** Maryland Bobcats FC (NISA)	Pittsburgh, Pennsylvania
7:00 pm EDT	Sims 37', 55'	Report		Stadium: Highmark Stadium; Referee: Samuel Reynolds

April 5	Indy Eleven (USLC) **(Indiana)**	**0–2**	**(Missouri) St. Louis City 2 (MLSNP)**	Indianapolis, Indiana
7:30 pm EDT		Report	Armstrong 18'; Kuzain 72'	Stadium: Carroll Stadium; Referee: Carlos Rodriguez

April 5	**Detroit City FC (USLC) (Michigan)**	**3–0**	**(Michigan)** Michigan Stars FC (NISA)	Hamtramck, Michigan
7:30 pm EDT	Rutz 45'; Lewis 45+2', 63'	Report		Stadium: Keyworth Stadium; Referee: Conlan Campbell

April 5	**Tampa Bay Rowdies (USLC) (Florida)**	**6–0**	**(Florida)** The Villages SC (USL2)	St. Petersburg, Florida
7:30 pm EDT	Mkosana 12', 20', 53'; Scarlett 36'; LaCava 63'; Wyke 72'	Report		Stadium: Al Lang Stadium; Referee: Alex Billeter

April 5	**Union Omaha (USL1) (Nebraska)**	**2–1**	**(Iowa)** Des Moines Menace (USL2)	Omaha, Nebraska
7:30 pm CDT	Scearce 19'; Alfeu Bertini 81' (o.g.)	Report	Hertzog 14'	Stadium: Morrison Stadium; Referee: TJ Bartels

April 5	**FC Tulsa (USLC) (Oklahoma)**	**2–1**	**(Oklahoma)** Tulsa Athletic (NPSL)	Tulsa, Oklahoma
7:30 pm CDT	Brown 5'; Rodríguez 19'	Report	Billy Nzojyibwami 77'	Stadium: ONEOK Field; Attendance: 2,388; Referee: Mathew Corrigan

April 5	**San Antonio FC (USLC) (Texas)**	**3–1**	**(Texas)** D'Feeters Kicks Soccer Club (LQ)	San Antonio, Texas
7:30 pm CDT	Sakshaug 53', 57'; Maloney 54'	Report	Sebastian Mendez 62'; Ramirez (red card) 83'	Stadium: Toyota Field; Attendance: 2,145; Referee: Elton Garcia

April 5	**New Mexico United (USLC)**	**5–0**	**(Nevada)** Las Vegas Legends (NPSL)	Albuquerque, New Mexico
7:30 pm MDT	Wehan 7' (pen.); Kiesewetter 17', 86' (pen.); Ovouka 40'; Sainté 47'	Report	Guzman (red card) 82'	Stadium: University of New Mexico Soccer Complex; Attendance: 2,128; Referee: Cuauhtemoc Delgadillo

April 5	**Central Valley Fuego FC (USL1) (California)**	**4–1**	**(Texas)** El Paso Locomotive FC (USLC)	Clovis, California
7:30 pm PDT	Bijev 4', 44'; Smith 15'; Chaney 62'	Report	John-Brown (red card) 58'; Calvillo 90'	Stadium: Lamonica Stadium at Clovis High School; Attendance: 4,000; Referee: Michael Zapata

April 5	**Orange County SC (USLC) (California)**	**5–2**	**(California)** Los Angeles Force (NISA)	Irvine, California
7:30 pm PDT	Pedersen 24'; Iloski 31'; Okoli 33'; Kuningas 53'; Henry 69'	Report	Goñi 37'; Clayton Torr 90'	Stadium: Championship Soccer Stadium; Referee: Joseph Salinas

April 6	**FC Motown (NPSL) (New Jersey)**	**1–0** (a.e.t.)	**(New York (state))** AC Syracuse Pulse (NISA)	Montclair, New Jersey
7:00 pm EDT	Federico de Oliveira 96'	Report		Stadium: MSU Soccer Park at Pittser Field; Attendance: 50; Referee: Luis Arroyo

April 6	**Miami FC (USLC) (Florida)**	**3–0**	**(Florida)** Miami United FC (NPSL)	Miami, Florida
7:00 pm EDT	Murphy 12' (pen.); Reid 30'; Parkes 82'	Report		Stadium: FIU Soccer Stadium; Attendance: 527; Referee: Anya Voigt

April 6	North Carolina FC (USL1) **(North Carolina)**	**1–2**	**(Texas) Rio Grande Valley FC Toros (USLC)**	Cary, North Carolina
7:00 pm EDT	Servania 45'	Report	López 54'; Nodarse 79'	Stadium: WakeMed Soccer Park; Attendance: 575; Referee: John Rush

April 6	Western Mass Pioneers (USL2) **(Massachusetts)**	**0–1** (a.e.t.)	**(New York (state)) Flower City Union (NISA)**	Ludlow, Massachusetts
7:30 pm EDT		Report	Fernandes 94'; Marcus Micheletti (red card) 110'	Stadium: Lusitano Stadium; Attendance: 580; Referee: Jeremy Scheer

April 6	**Louisville City FC (USLC) (Kentucky)**	**1–0**	**(Tennessee)** Chattanooga Red Wolves SC (USL1)	Louisville, Kentucky
7:30 pm EDT	Harris 75'	Report		Stadium: Lynn Family Stadium; Attendance: 4,520; Referee: Nabil Bensalah

April 6	Northern Virginia FC (LQ) **(Virginia)**	**0–1**	**(Virginia) Richmond Kickers (USL1)**	Leesburg, Virginia
8:00 pm EDT		Report	Olsen 34'	Stadium: Virginia Revolution Sportsplex; Attendance: 575; Referee: Nicholas Karnovsky

April 6	**Forward Madison FC (USL1) (Wisconsin)**	**3–0**	**(Ohio)** Cleveland SC (NPSL)	Madison, Wisconsin
7:00 pm CDT	Sukow 37'; Murillo 45+1'; Bartman 68'	Report		Stadium: Breese Stevens Field; Referee: Calin Radosav

April 6	Colorado Springs Switchbacks FC (USLC) **(Colorado)**	**0–1** (a.e.t.)	**Northern Colorado Hailstorm FC (USL1)**	Colorado Springs, Colorado
7:00 pm MDT	Hodge (yellow card) 90+6' (yellow-red card) 103'	Report	Parra (red card) 27'; Jerry Desdunes 96'	Stadium: Weidner Field; Attendance: 1,099; Referee: Laura Rodriguez
Note: First competitive game and goal for Northern Colorado.

April 6	**FC Tucson (USL1) (Arizona)**	**3–2**	**(Nevada)** Las Vegas Lights FC (USLC)	Tucson, Arizona
7:30 pm MST	Crull 45'; Romero 71' (o.g.); Allen 77'	Report	Traore 66'; Crisostomo 80'	Stadium: Kino North Stadium; Referee: Benjamin Davis

April 6	**Phoenix Rising FC (USLC) (Arizona)**	**1–0** (a.e.t.)	**(Arizona)** Valley United FC (NISA)	Chandler, Arizona
7:30 pm MST	Repetto 115'	Report	Contreras (red card) 81'	Stadium: Wild Horse Pass Stadium; Referee: Dejan Susak

April 6	Albion San Diego (NISA) **(California)**	**1–2**	**(California) San Diego Loyal SC (USLC)**	San Diego, California
7:30 pm PDT	Malango 65'; Jacob Haupt (red card) 90+2'	Report	Conway 45'; Taylor Crull 89'	Stadium: Canyon Crest Academy; Attendance: 1,750; Referee: Saul Rojas

April 6	**Bay Cities FC (NISA) (California)**	**2–1**	**(California)** Monterey Bay FC (USLC)	San Jose, California
7:30 pm PDT	Rei Dorwart 55'; Edson Cardona 90+1'	Report	Crawford 87'	Stadium: PayPal Park; Attendance: 1,083; Referee: Turan Özdemir

April 7	Charleston Battery (USLC) **(South Carolina)**	**0–1**	**(Georgia (U.S. state)) South Georgia Tormenta FC (USL1)**	Mount Pleasant, South Carolina
11:00 am EDT			Bosua 61'	Stadium: Patriots Point Soccer Complex; Attendance: Played behind Closed Doors
Note: Moved from April 6 due to extreme weather.

April 7	**Rochester New York FC (MLSNP) (New York (state))**	**1–0**	**(New York (state))** Lansdowne Yonkers FC (NAC)	Brighton, New York
4:00 pm EDT	Rayo 45+5'	Report		Stadium: John L. DiMarco Field at Monroe Community College; Attendance: 267; Referee: Alex Parent

April 7	**Chattanooga FC (NISA) (Tennessee)**	**3–1**	**(Tennessee)** Memphis 901 FC (USLC)	Chattanooga, Tennessee
7:00 pm EDT	Alex McGrath 1'; Ward 29'; Taylor Gray 45+3'		Seagrist 39'	Stadium: Finley Stadium; Attendance: 2,057; Referee: Wes Caouette

April 7	**Greenville Triumph SC (USL1) (South Carolina)**	**2–0**	**(California)** Oakland Roots SC (USLC)	Greenville, South Carolina
7:00 pm EDT	Keegan 29'; Smart 90+4'	Report		Stadium: Legacy Early College Field; Referee: Wilmer Soriano

April 7	**Hartford Athletic (USLC) (Connecticut)**	**3–1**	**(New York (state))** Oyster Bay United FC (LQ)	Hartford, Connecticut
7:00 pm EDT	Johnson 49'; Prpa 70'; Saydee 90+2'	Report	Junior Rosero 59' (pen.)	Stadium: Trinity Health Stadium; Attendance: 1,634; Referee: Kenneth Rojas

April 7	**Birmingham Legion FC (USLC) (Alabama)**	**3–1**	**(Mississippi)** Southern States SC (NPSL)	Tuscaloosa, Alabama
7:00 pm CDT	Kasim 48'; Lapa 62'; Marlon 63'		Mason Walsh 73'	Stadium: Alabama Soccer Stadium; Referee: Benjamin Meyer

April 7	**California United Strikers FC (NISA)**	**5–0**	**(California)** San Fernando Valley FC (LQ)	Irvine, California
7:30 pm PDT	Marcus Lee 4'; Anthony López-Carrillo 15', 78'; Aydan Bowers 31'; Guilherme Farias 71'			Stadium: Championship Soccer Stadium; Referee: Samantha Martinez

April 7	**Sacramento Republic FC (USLC) (California)**	**6–0**	**(Oregon)** Portland Timbers U23s (USL2)	Sacramento, California
7:30 pm PDT	Lacroix 13', 35'; Viader 22'; LaGrassa 26'; López 30'; Lewis 41'	Report		Stadium: Heart Health Park; Attendance: 2,260; Referee: Michael Zapata

== Third round ==
The winners of the second round and the new entrants to the tournament were grouped geographically into groups of four (12 groups) or six (eight groups), depending on the distribution of teams after the second round. Division I (MLS) teams entering the tournament were spread among the groups as evenly as possible (groups of four: five groups with two and seven groups with one MLS team; groups of six: one group with three and seven groups with two MLS teams). All MLS teams faced a lower-division team. Random selection for each group determined the pairs. Instances where geographical fit didn't exist when creating groups was resolved by random selection.

Teams for Third round draw
Previous round winners	New entrants (MLS)
FC Motown (NPSL); North Carolina Fusion U23 (USL2); Rochester New York FC (MLSNP); St. Louis City 2 (MLSNP); Bay Cities FC (NISA); California United Strikers FC (NISA); Chattanooga FC (NISA); Flower City Union (NISA); Central Valley Fuego FC (USL1); Forward Madison FC (USL1); Greenville Triumph SC (USL1); Northern Colorado Hailstorm FC (USL1); Richmond Kickers (USL1); South Georgia Tormenta FC (USL1); FC Tucson (USL1); Union Omaha (USL1); Birmingham Legion FC (USLC); Detroit City FC (USLC); Hartford Athletic (USLC); Louisville City FC (USLC); Miami FC (USLC); New Mexico United (USLC); Orange County SC (USLC); Phoenix Rising FC (USLC); Pittsburgh Riverhounds SC (USLC); Rio Grande Valley FC (USLC); Sacramento Republic FC (USLC); San Antonio FC (USLC); San Diego Loyal SC (USLC); Tampa Bay Rowdies (USLC); FC Tulsa (USLC)	Atlanta United FC; Austin FC; Charlotte FC; Chicago Fire FC; FC Cincinnati; Columbus Crew; D.C. United; FC Dallas; Houston Dynamo FC; Inter Miami CF; Los Angeles FC; LA Galaxy; Minnesota United FC; New York Red Bulls; Orlando City SC; Real Salt Lake; San Jose Earthquakes

Draw Groups
North	Northeast	Southern California	Texas	Central	Florida	Mountain	Northern California	Piedmont	Southeast
Chicago Fire FC (MLS); Minnesota United FC (MLS); Louisville City FC (USLC); St. Louis City 2 (MLSNP); Forward Madison FC (USL1); Union Omaha (USL1)	D.C. United (MLS); New York Red Bulls (MLS); Hartford Athletic (USLC); Rochester New York FC (MLSNP); Flower City Union (NISA); FC Motown (NPSL)	Los Angeles FC (MLS); LA Galaxy (MLS); Orange County SC (USLC); San Diego Loyal SC (USLC); FC Tucson (USL1); California United Strikers FC (NISA)	Austin FC (MLS); FC Dallas (MLS); Houston Dynamo FC (MLS); Rio Grande Valley FC (USLC); San Antonio FC (USLC); FC Tulsa (USLC)	FC Cincinnati (MLS); Columbus Crew (MLS); Detroit City FC (USLC); Pittsburgh Riverhounds SC (USLC)	Inter Miami CF (MLS); Orlando City SC (MLS); Miami FC (USLC); Tampa Bay Rowdies (USLC)	Real Salt Lake (MLS); New Mexico United (USLC); Phoenix Rising FC (USLC); Northern Colorado Hailstorm FC (USL1)	San Jose Earthquakes (MLS); Sacramento Republic FC (USLC); Bay Cities FC (NISA); Central Valley Fuego FC (USL1)	Charlotte FC (MLS); Greenville Triumph SC (USL1); Richmond Kickers (USL1); North Carolina Fusion U23 (USL2)	Atlanta United FC (MLS); Birmingham Legion FC (USLC); Chattanooga FC (NISA); South Georgia Tormenta FC (USL1)

All times local to game site.

April 19	Miami FC (USLC) (Florida)	0–1	(Florida) Inter Miami CF (MLS)	Miami, Florida
7:00 pm EDT		Report	Campana 83'	Stadium: Riccardo Silva Stadium; Attendance: 11,158; Referee: Alex Billeter

April 19	Flower City Union (NISA) (New York (state))	0–3	(Washington, D.C.) D.C. United (MLS)	Rochester, New York
7:00 pm EDT		Report	Kamara 73', 86' (pen.); Robertha 81'	Stadium: Rochester Community Sports Complex; Attendance: 556; Referee: Luis Arroyo

April 19	Detroit City FC (USLC) (Michigan)	2–1	(Ohio) Columbus Crew (MLS)	Hamtramck, Michigan
7:00 pm EDT	Rodriguez 64', 86' (pen.)	Report	Zardes 7' (pen.)	Stadium: Keyworth Stadium; Attendance: 6,121; Referee: Chris Ruska

April 19	FC Cincinnati (MLS) (Ohio)	2–0 (a.e.t.)	(Pennsylvania) Pittsburgh Riverhounds SC (USLC)	Cincinnati, Ohio
7:30 pm EDT	Barreal 95' (pen.), 99'	Report		Stadium: TQL Stadium; Attendance: 5,458; Referee: Eric Tattersall

April 19	Birmingham Legion FC (USLC) (Alabama)	0–2	(Georgia (U.S. state)) South Georgia Tormenta FC (USL1)	Tuscaloosa, Alabama
7:00 pm CDT		Report	Thorn 33'; Dengler 45'	Stadium: Alabama Soccer Stadium; Referee: Sergii Demianchuk

April 19	Chicago Fire FC (MLS) (Illinois)	2–2 (a.e.t.) (4–5 p)	(Nebraska) Union Omaha (USL1)	Chicago, Illinois
7:00 pm CDT	Czichos 53' (pen.), 115' (pen.)	Report	Meza 68'; Touche 120+2'	Stadium: Soldier Field; Referee: Calin Radosav
	Penalties
	Przybyłko (penalty missed); Czichos (penalty scored); Espinoza (penalty scored); Ivanov (penalty scored); Bezerra (penalty scored); Navarro (penalty missed)		(penalty scored) Kametani; (penalty scored) Alihodžić; (penalty missed) Meza; (penalty scored) Knutson; (penalty scored) Montesdeoca; (penalty scored) Acoff

April 19	FC Dallas (MLS) (Texas)	2–1	(Oklahoma) FC Tulsa (USLC)	Frisco, Texas
7:30 pm CDT	Jara 32' (pen.); Obrian 56'	Report	Bourgeois 42'	Stadium: Toyota Stadium; Attendance: 2,287; Referee: Lorenzo Hernandez

April 19	Houston Dynamo FC (MLS) (Texas)	2–1	(Texas) Rio Grande Valley FC (USLC)	Houston, Texas
7:30 pm CDT	Nodarse 9' (o.g.); Junqua 90+3'	Report	Hadebe 48' (o.g.)	Stadium: PNC Stadium; Attendance: 7,983; Referee: Elton García

April 19	FC Tucson (USL1) (Arizona)	1–2	California United Strikers FC (NISA)	Tucson, Arizona
7:30 pm MST	Calixtro 17'	Report	Nuño 71'; Kawashima 90+2'	Stadium: Kino North Stadium; Attendance: 528; Referee: Dejan Susak

April 19	San Jose Earthquakes (MLS) (California)	5–0	(California) Bay Cities FC (NISA)	San Jose, California
7:30 pm PDT	Skahan 25'; Marie 37'; Cowell 59' (pen.); Tsakiris 82'; Bouda 88'	Report		Stadium: PayPal Park; Attendance: 8,058; Referee: Malik Badawi

April 19	LA Galaxy (MLS) (California)	1–0	(California) San Diego Loyal SC (USLC)	Carson, California
7:30 pm PDT	Cabral 28'	Report		Stadium: Dignity Health Sports Park; Attendance: 9,473; Referee: Brandon Stevis

April 20	Rochester New York FC (MLSNP) (New York (state))	2–2 (a.e.t.) (4–3 p)	(New Jersey) FC Motown (NPSL)	Brighton, New York
6:00 pm EDT	Batista 22'; Inalien 39'		Duka 40'; Fala 90+1'	Stadium: John L. DiMarco Field; Attendance: 396; Referee: Christian Centeno
	Penalties
	Rissi (penalty scored); Williams (penalty missed); Garrett (penalty missed); Djaló (penalty scored); Drai (penalty scored); Vanacker (penalty scored)		(penalty missed) Duka; (penalty scored) Fala; (penalty scored) Pieles; (penalty missed) de Oliveira; (penalty scored) Alberto; (penalty missed) Perez

April 20	Richmond Kickers (USL1) (Virginia)	1–0 (a.e.t.)	(North Carolina) North Carolina Fusion U23 (USL2)	Richmond, Virginia
6:30 pm EDT	Terzaghi 118'			Stadium: City Stadium; Attendance: 1,219

April 20	Hartford Athletic (USLC) (Connecticut)	1–2	(New Jersey) New York Red Bulls (MLS)	Hartford, Connecticut
7:00 pm EDT	McGlynn 51'		Morgan 18'; Long 25'	Stadium: Trinity Health Stadium; Attendance: 5,144

April 20	Orlando City SC (MLS) (Florida)	2–1	(Florida) Tampa Bay Rowdies (USLC)	Orlando, Florida
7:00 pm EDT	Pato 52'; Urso 63'		Mkosana 65'	Stadium: Exploria Stadium; Attendance: 8,057
Note: Game originally scheduled to be played at Osceola County Stadium in Kissimmee, Florida. Location changed on April 11.

April 20	Greenville Triumph SC (USL1) (South Carolina)	1–2 (a.e.t.)	(North Carolina) Charlotte FC (MLS)	Greenville, South Carolina
7:00 pm EDT	Keegan 59'	Report	Ortiz 39'; Afful 105+1'	Stadium: Legacy Early College Field; Attendance: 4,064

April 20	Forward Madison FC (USL1) (Wisconsin)	0–2	Minnesota United FC (MLS)	Madison, Wisconsin
6:00 pm CDT			Hunou 51'; Kallman 83'	Stadium: Breese Stevens Field; Attendance: 2,663; Referee: Jervis Atagana

April 20	Atlanta United FC (MLS) (Georgia (U.S. state))	6–0	(Tennessee) Chattanooga FC (NISA)	Kennesaw, Georgia
7:30 pm EDT	Hernández 21'; Dwyer 25', 35'; Moreno 53' (pen.); Luiz Araújo 67'; Lennon 84'			Stadium: Fifth Third Bank Stadium; Attendance: 3,740

April 20	Louisville City FC (USLC) (Kentucky)	0–0 (a.e.t.) (9–8 p)	(Missouri) St. Louis City 2 (MLSNP)	Louisville, Kentucky
7:30 pm EDT		Report		Stadium: Lynn Family Stadium; Attendance: 5,243; Referee: Kyle Johnston
	Penalties
	Totsch (penalty scored); Harris (penalty scored); Gonzalez (penalty missed); Matsoso (penalty scored); Moguel (penalty scored); Pino (penalty scored); Serrano (penalty scored); Leinhos (penalty scored); Gibson (penalty scored); Wynder (penalty scored)		(penalty missed) Schneider; (penalty scored) Di Rosa; (penalty scored) Hiebert; (penalty scored) Armstrong; (penalty scored) Yaro; (penalty scored) Rivas; (penalty scored) Heard; (penalty scored) Volmar; (penalty scored) Awuah; (penalty missed) Armstrong

April 20	San Antonio FC (USLC) (Texas)	2–1 (a.e.t.)	(Texas) Austin FC (MLS)	San Antonio, Texas
8:00 p.m. CDT	Collier 82'; Manley 96'		Fagúndez 47'	Stadium: Toyota Field; Attendance: 7,922

April 20	Real Salt Lake (MLS) (Utah)	0–1	Northern Colorado Hailstorm FC (USL1)	Sandy, Utah
7:30 pm MDT			Cornwall 70'	Stadium: Rio Tinto Stadium; Attendance: 19,301

April 20	Phoenix Rising FC (USLC) (Arizona)	2–1	(New Mexico) New Mexico United (USLC)	Chandler, Arizona
7:30 pm MST	Calistri 6'; Hurst 81'		Brett 65'	Stadium: Wild Horse Pass Stadium

April 20	Sacramento Republic FC (USLC) (California)	2–1	(California) Central Valley Fuego FC (USL1)	Sacramento, California
7:30 pm PDT	Casey 44'; López 90+5' (pen.)		Bustamante 76'	Stadium: Heart Health Park; Attendance: 3,712

April 20	Los Angeles FC (MLS) (California)	5–1	(California) Orange County SC (USLC)	Los Angeles, California
7:30 pm PDT	Musovski 13', 71'; Arango 34', 45'; Jennings 68'		Torres 73'	Stadium: Banc of California Stadium

== Round of 32 ==
The winners of the Third Round and the new entrants to the tournament were grouped geographically into groups of four (eight groups). Each group had one of the MLS teams entering this round. Random selection for each group determined the pairs. Instances where geographical fit didn't exist when creating groups was resolved by random selection. The draw for the Round of 32 took place on April 21.

Teams for Round of 32 Draw
Previous Round winners	New Entrants (MLS)
Rochester New York FC (MLSNP); California United Strikers FC (NISA); Northern Colorado Hailstorm FC (USL1); Richmond Kickers (USL1); South Georgia Tormenta FC (USL1); Union Omaha (USL1); Detroit City FC (USLC); Louisville City FC (USLC); Phoenix Rising FC (USLC); Sacramento Republic FC (USLC); San Antonio FC (USLC); Atlanta United FC (MLS); Charlotte FC (MLS); FC Cincinnati (MLS); D.C. United (MLS); FC Dallas (MLS); Houston Dynamo FC (MLS); Inter Miami CF (MLS); LA Galaxy (MLS); Los Angeles FC (MLS); Minnesota United FC (MLS); New York Red Bulls (MLS); Orlando City SC (MLS); San Jose Earthquakes (MLS)	Colorado Rapids; Nashville SC; New England Revolution; New York City FC; Philadelphia Union; Portland Timbers; Seattle Sounders FC; Sporting Kansas City

Draw Groups
East Central	North Central	Northern Atlantic	Northern Pacific	South	South Central	Southern Atlantic	Southern Pacific
FC Cincinnati (MLS); New England Revolution (MLS); Detroit City FC (USLC); Louisville City FC (USLC)	Colorado Rapids (MLS); Minnesota United FC (MLS); Northern Colorado Hailstorm FC (USL1); Union Omaha (USL1)	D.C. United (MLS); New York City FC (MLS); New York Red Bulls (MLS); Rochester New York FC (MLSNP)	Seattle Sounders FC (MLS); San Jose Earthquakes (MLS); Phoenix Rising FC (USLC); Sacramento Republic FC (USLC)	Atlanta United FC (MLS); Charlotte FC (MLS); Nashville SC (MLS); Richmond Kickers (USL1)	FC Dallas (MLS); Houston Dynamo FC (MLS); Sporting Kansas City (MLS); San Antonio FC (USLC)	Inter Miami CF (MLS); Orlando City SC (MLS); Philadelphia Union (MLS); South Georgia Tormenta FC (USL1)	LA Galaxy (MLS); Los Angeles FC (MLS); Portland Timbers (MLS); California United Strikers FC (NISA)

All times local to game site.

May 10	Orlando City SC (MLS) (Florida)	2–1	(Pennsylvania) Philadelphia Union (MLS)	Orlando, Florida
7:00 pm EDT	Kara 54'; Perea 57'	Report	Findlay 77'	Stadium: Exploria Stadium; Attendance: 7,601; Referee: Elvis Osmanovic

May 10	D.C. United (MLS) (Washington, D.C.)	0–3	(New Jersey) New York Red Bulls (MLS)	Washington, D.C.
7:30 pm EDT		Report	Luquinhas 45+3'; Tolkin 48'; Ryan 68'	Stadium: Audi Field; Attendance: 8,920; Referee: Matt Franz

May 10	Detroit City FC (USLC) (Michigan)	1–1 (a.e.t.) (2–4 p)	(Kentucky) Louisville City FC (USLC)	Hamtramck, Michigan
7:30 pm EDT	Rodriguez 14' (pen.)	Report	Harris 24'	Stadium: Keyworth Stadium; Attendance: 6,837; Referee: Calin Radosav
	Penalties
	Rodriguez (penalty scored); Williams (penalty missed); Hoppenot (penalty scored); Carroll (penalty missed)		(penalty scored) Totsch; (penalty scored) McCabe; (penalty scored) Harris; (penalty scored) Pino

May 10	Inter Miami CF (MLS) (Florida)	3–1	(Georgia (U.S. state)) South Georgia Tormenta FC (USL1)	Fort Lauderdale, Florida
8:00 pm EDT	Lassiter 45', 83'; Robinson 47'	Report	Sterling 88'	Stadium: DRV PNK Stadium; Attendance: 3,198; Referee: Alejo Calume

May 10	Sporting Kansas City (MLS)	4–2 (a.e.t.)	(Texas) FC Dallas (MLS)	Kansas City, Kansas
7:30 pm CDT	Vujnović 60'; Tzionis 90+8'; Cerrillo 94' (o.g.); Shelton 113'	Report	Jara 8'; Munjoma 34'	Stadium: Children's Mercy Park; Attendance: 14,922; Referee: Malik Badawi

May 10	Los Angeles FC (MLS) (California)	2–0	(Oregon) Portland Timbers (MLS)	Los Angeles, California
7:30 pm PDT	Arango 32'; Fall 54'	Report		Stadium: Banc of California Stadium; Attendance: 11,014; Referee: Mark Allatin

May 11	Richmond Kickers (USL1) (Virginia)	1–5	(North Carolina) Charlotte FC (MLS)	Richmond, Virginia
6:30 pm EDT	Morán 53'	Report	Ríos 34'; Reyna 54'; Gaines 58', 61'; Shinyashiki 86'	Stadium: City Stadium; Attendance: 4,621; Referee: Luis Arroyo

May 11	New York City FC (MLS) (New York (state))	3–1	(New York (state)) Rochester New York FC (MLSNP)	New York, New York
7:00 pm EDT	Thiago Andrade 23'; Héber 31'; Chanot 76'	Report	Batiz 45+3'	Stadium: Belson Stadium; Attendance: 1,002; Referee: Ernie Constantine

May 11	New England Revolution (MLS) (Massachusetts)	5–1	(Ohio) FC Cincinnati (MLS)	Foxborough, Massachusetts
7:00 pm EDT	Gil 34' (pen.), 37', 53'; Buksa 47', 57'	Report	Barreal 12'	Stadium: Gillette Stadium; Attendance: 2,017; Referee: Lukasz Szpala

May 11	Nashville SC (MLS) (Tennessee)	3–2 (a.e.t.)	(Georgia (U.S. state)) Atlanta United FC (MLS)	Nashville, Tennessee
7:00 pm CDT	Mukhtar 50' (pen.); Sapong 90+2'; Zubak 93'	Report	Almada 13'; Luiz Araújo 29'	Stadium: Geodis Park; Attendance: 12,375; Referee: Elton García

May 11	Union Omaha (USL1) (Nebraska)	2–0	(Colorado) Northern Colorado Hailstorm FC (USL1)	Omaha, Nebraska
7:00 pm CDT	Meza 46'; Doyle 58'	Report		Stadium: Al F. Caniglia Field; Attendance: 1,931; Referee: Esad Omanovic

May 11	Houston Dynamo FC (MLS) (Texas)	1–0	(Texas) San Antonio FC (USLC)	Houston, Texas
7:30 pm CDT	Ferreira 82'	Report		Stadium: PNC Stadium; Attendance: 2,541; Referee: Nima Saghafi

May 11	Seattle Sounders FC (MLS) (Washington (state))	2–2 (a.e.t.) (9–10 p)	(California) San Jose Earthquakes (MLS)	Tukwila, Washington
7:00 pm PDT	Medranda 54'; Montero 77'	Report	Skahan 10' (pen.); Cowell 50'	Stadium: Starfire Sports Complex; Attendance: 3,773; Referee: Esad Omanovic
	Penalties
	Montero (penalty scored); Cissoko (penalty scored); Léo Chú (penalty missed); Teves (penalty scored); Adeniran (penalty scored); Rowe (penalty scored); Ragen (penalty scored); Atencio (penalty scored); Vargas (penalty scored); Tolo (penalty scored); Cleveland (penalty missed)		(penalty scored) Espinoza; (penalty missed) Yueill; (penalty scored) Ebobisse; (penalty scored) Calvo; (penalty scored) Jamiro; (penalty scored) López; (penalty scored) Beason; (penalty scored) Skahan; (penalty scored) Ågren; (penalty scored) Remedi; (penalty scored) Bersano

May 11	Sacramento Republic FC (USLC) (California)	2–0	(Arizona) Phoenix Rising FC (USLC)	Sacramento, California
7:30 pm PDT	Luis Felipe 30'; Martínez 88'	Report		Stadium: Heart Health Park; Attendance: 3,273; Referee: Joseph Salinas

May 11	California United Strikers FC (NISA) (California)	2–3	(California) LA Galaxy (MLS)	Irvine, California
7:30 pm PDT	Kadono 19'; Garcia-Lopez 87'	Report	Joveljić 45' (pen.), 83' (pen.); Lambe 80'	Stadium: Championship Soccer Stadium; Attendance: 3,749; Referee: Samantha Martinez

May 12	Minnesota United FC (MLS)	2–1	(Colorado) Colorado Rapids (MLS)	Saint Paul, Minnesota
1:00 pm CDT	Danladi 8'; Reynoso 87'	Report	Mezquida 15'	Stadium: Allianz Field; Referee: Brandon Stevis
Note: Match was originally scheduled for May 11 and was suspended in the 20th minute due to lightning.

== Round of 16 and Quarterfinals ==
The winners of the Round of 32 were grouped geographically into groups of four (four groups). Random selection for each group determined the pairs. The Round of 16/Quarterfinal draw took place on May 12 at 8:30 PM EDT on Futbol Americas on ESPN+.

Draw Groups
Central	Northeast	Southeast	West
Houston Dynamo FC (MLS); Minnesota United FC (MLS); Sporting Kansas City (MLS); Union Omaha (USL1)	Charlotte FC (MLS); New England Revolution (MLS); New York City FC (MLS); New York Red Bulls (MLS)	Inter Miami CF (MLS); Nashville SC (MLS); Orlando City SC (MLS); Louisville City FC (USLC)	LA Galaxy (MLS); Los Angeles FC (MLS); San Jose Earthquakes (MLS); Sacramento Republic FC (USLC)

Round of 16; May 24–25
MLS	**Sporting Kansas City**	**2**
MLS	Houston Dynamo FC	1
Central
MLS	Minnesota United FC	1
USL1	**Union Omaha**	**2**
MLS	**New York Red Bulls**	**3**
MLS	Charlotte FC	1
Northeast
MLS	**New York City FC**	**1***
MLS	New England Revolution	0
MLS	**Orlando City SC**	**1 (4)**
MLS	Inter Miami CF	1 (2)
Southeast
USLC	Louisville City FC	1
MLS	**Nashville SC**	**2**
MLS	**LA Galaxy**	**3**
MLS	Los Angeles FC	1
West
USLC	**Sacramento Republic FC**	**2**
MLS	San Jose Earthquakes	0

Quarterfinals; June 21–22, 29
MLS	**Sporting Kansas City**	**6**
USL1	Union Omaha	0
MLS	**New York Red Bulls**	**3**
MLS	New York City FC	0
MLS	**Orlando City SC**	**1 (6)**
MLS	Nashville SC	1 (5)
MLS	LA Galaxy	1
USLC	**Sacramento Republic FC**	**2**

Bold = winner
* = after extra time, ( ) = penalty shoot-out score

=== Round of 16 ===
All times local to game site.

May 25	**Orlando City SC (MLS) (Florida)**	**1–1** (a.e.t.) (**4–2** p)	**(Florida)** Inter Miami CF (MLS)	Orlando, Florida
7:00 pm EDT	Torres 97'	Report	Mota 94'	Stadium: Exploria Stadium; Attendance: 11,509; Referee: Kevin Broadley
	**Penalties**
	Kara (penalty scored); Jansson (penalty scored); Perea (penalty scored); Pereyra (penalty scored)		(penalty scored) Campana; (penalty missed) Duke; (penalty missed) Yedlin; (penalty scored) Lassiter

May 25	Louisville City FC (USLC) **(Kentucky)**	**1–2**	**(Tennessee) Nashville SC (MLS)**	Louisville, Kentucky
7:00 pm EDT	Ownby 37'	Report	Loba 39'; Mukhtar 89'	Stadium: Lynn Family Stadium; Attendance: 8,638; Referee: Eric Tatersall

May 25	**New York City FC (MLS) (New York (state))**	**1–0** (a.e.t.)	**(Massachusetts)** New England Revolution (MLS)	New York, New York
7:30 pm EDT	Rodríguez 94'	Report		Stadium: Belson Stadium; Attendance: 1,200; Referee: Luis Arroyo

May 25	**New York Red Bulls (MLS) (New Jersey)**	**3–1**	**(North Carolina)** Charlotte FC (MLS)	Montclair, New Jersey
8:00 pm EDT	Klimala 2'; Nealis 63'; Barlow 90+2'	Report	Ríos 8'	Stadium: MSU Soccer Park; Attendance: 3,500; Referee: Ernie Constantine

May 25	Minnesota United FC (MLS) **(Minnesota)**	**1–2**	**(Nebraska) Union Omaha (USL1)**	Saint Paul, Minnesota
7:00 pm CDT	Hunou 6'	Report	Kametani 45+1'; Brito 51'	Stadium: Allianz Field; Referee: Elton García

May 25	**Sporting Kansas City (MLS)**	**2–1**	**(Texas)** Houston Dynamo FC (MLS)	Kansas City, Kansas
7:30 pm CDT	Russell 52', 73' (pen.)	Report	Baird 41'	Stadium: Children's Mercy Park; Attendance: 14,913; Referee: Calin Radosav

May 25	**LA Galaxy (MLS) (California)**	**3–1**	**(California)** Los Angeles FC (MLS)	Carson, California
7:30 pm PDT	Cabral 51'; Hernández 57'; Joveljić 81'	Report	Hollingshead 85'	Stadium: Dignity Health Sports Park; Attendance: 24,174; Referee: Brandon Stevis

May 25	**Sacramento Republic FC (USLC) (California)**	**2–0**	**(California)** San Jose Earthquakes (MLS)	Sacramento, California
7:30 pm PDT	Luis Felipe 28'; López 83'	Report		Stadium: Heart Health Park; Attendance: 11,569; Referee: Elijio Arreguin

=== Quarterfinals ===
All times local to game site.

June 21	LA Galaxy (MLS) **(California)**	**1–2**	**(California) Sacramento Republic FC (USLC)**	Carson, California
7:30 pm PDT	Donovan 18' (o.g.)	Report	López 4'; Luis Felipe 70'	Stadium: Dignity Health Sports Park; Attendance: 12,315; Referee: Malik Badawi

June 22	**New York Red Bulls (MLS) (New Jersey)**	**3–0**	**(New York (state))** New York City FC (MLS)	Harrison, New Jersey
7:00 pm EDT	Morgan 52'; Luquinhas 70'; Fernandez 90+1'	Report		Stadium: Red Bull Arena; Attendance: 12,575; Referee: Matthew Thompson

June 22	**Sporting Kansas City (MLS)**	**6–0**	**(Nebraska)** Union Omaha (USL1)	Kansas City, Kansas
7:30 pm CDT	Sallói 10', 53'; Ford 37'; Shelton 56'; Hernández 66', 81'	Report		Stadium: Children's Mercy Park; Attendance: 18,552; Referee: Brandon Stevis

June 29	**Orlando City SC (MLS) (Florida)**	**1–1** (a.e.t.) (**6–5** p)	**(Tennessee)** Nashville SC (MLS)	Orlando, Florida
7:00 pm EDT	Schlegel 90+4'	Report	Mukhtar 52'	Stadium: Exploria Stadium; Attendance: 11,940; Referee: Mark Allatin
	**Penalties**
	Kara (penalty scored); Jansson (penalty scored); Perea (penalty missed); Smith (penalty scored); Pato (penalty scored); Carlos (penalty scored); Torres (penalty scored)		(penalty missed) Muyl; (penalty scored) Loba; (penalty scored) Maher; (penalty scored) Zimmerman; (penalty scored) Zubak; (penalty scored) Romney; (penalty missed) Miller

== Semifinals and Final ==
The Quarterfinal winners were matched geographically to determine the pairings for the semifinal round. The draw to determine the home teams for the semifinals and the final was held on June 23.

Semifinals; July 27
MLS	Orlando City SC	5
MLS	New York Red Bulls	1
USLC	Sacramento Republic FC	0 (5)
MLS	Sporting Kansas City	0 (4)

Final; September 7
MLS	Orlando City SC	3
USLC	Sacramento Republic FC	0

=== Semifinals ===
All times local to game site.

July 27	Orlando City SC (MLS) (Florida)	5–1	(New Jersey) New York Red Bulls (MLS)	Orlando, Florida
7:30 pm EDT	Araújo 45+5', 62'; Pereyra 47'; Torres 75'; Michel 83'	Report	Morgan 45+1'	Stadium: Exploria Stadium; Attendance: 11,612; Referee: Victor Rivas

July 27	Sacramento Republic FC (USLC) (California)	0–0 (a.e.t.) (5–4 p)	(Kansas) Sporting Kansas City (MLS)	Sacramento, California
7:30 pm PDT		Report		Stadium: Heart Health Park; Attendance: 11,569; Referee: Allen Chapman
	Penalties
	Viader (penalty scored); Fernandes (penalty scored); Archimède (penalty scored); Foster (penalty scored); López (penalty scored)		(penalty scored) Russell; (penalty scored) Sallói; (penalty scored) Agada; (penalty scored) Hernández; (penalty missed) Zusi

=== Final ===
September 7, 2022
8:00 pm EDT

Orlando City SC (MLS)	3–0	Sacramento Republic FC (USLC)
Torres 75', 80' (pen.); Michel 90+6'	Report

Exploria Stadium, Orlando, Florida
Attendance: 25,527
Referee: Ramy Touchan

== Top goal scorers ==
Team eliminated for this round.

Rank	Player	Team	Goals	By round							
Rank	Player	Team	Goals	1R	2R	3R	R32	R16	QF	SF	F
1	(United States) Rodrigo López	Sacramento Republic FC	4		1	1		1	1		
1	(Zimbabwe) Lucky Mkosana	Tampa Bay Rowdies	4		3	1					
1	(Uruguay) Facundo Torres	Orlando City SC	4					1		1	2
4	(Colombia) Cristian Arango	Los Angeles FC	3			2	1				
4	(Argentina) Álvaro Barreal	FC Cincinnati	3			2	1				
4	(Argentina) Tomas Bosuel	San Fernando Valley FC	3	3							
4	(United States) Luis Felipe	Sacramento Republic FC	3				1	1	1		
4	(Spain) Carles Gil	New England Revolution	3				3				
4	(Serbia) Dejan Joveljić	LA Galaxy	3				2	1			
4	(Scotland) Lewis Morgan	New York Red Bulls	3			1			1	1	
4	(Germany) Hany Mukhtar	Nashville SC	3				1	1	1		
4	(United States) Maxi Rodriguez	Detroit City FC	3			2	1				
13	(Spain) David Achaerandio Martín	Escondido FC	2	2							
13	(Uruguay) César Araújo	Orlando City SC	2							2	
13	(Brazil) Luiz Araújo	Atlanta United FC	2			1	1				
13	(Bulgaria) Villyan Bijev	Central Valley Fuego FC	2		2						
13	(Poland) Adam Buksa	New England Revolution	2				2				
13	(France) Kévin Cabral	LA Galaxy	2			1		1			
13	(United States) Evan Conway	San Diego Loyal SC	2		2						
13	(United States) Cade Cowell	San Jose Earthquakes	2			1	1				
13	(Germany) Rafael Czichos	Chicago Fire FC	2			2					
13	(United States) Dom Dwyer	Atlanta United FC	2			2					
13	(Argentina) Lucas Espíndola	Miami United FC	2	2							
13	(United States) McKinze Gaines	Charlotte FC	2				2				
13	(United States) Wilson Harris	Louisville City FC	2		1		1				
13	(Colombia) Felipe Hernández	Sporting Kansas City	2						2		
13	(France) Adrien Hunou	Minnesota United FC	2			1		1			
13	(Argentina) Franco Jara	FC Dallas	2			1	1				
13	(Norway) Ola Kamara	D.C. United	2			2					
13	(United States) Jake Keegan	Greenville Triumph SC	2		1	1					
13	(United States) Jerome Kiesewetter	New Mexico United	2		2						
13	(Haiti) Duke Lacroix	Sacramento Republic FC	2		2						
13	(Costa Rica) Ariel Lassiter	Inter Miami CF	2				2				
13	(United States) Matt Lewis	Detroit City FC	2		2						
13	(United States) Tony López	California United Strikers FC	2		2						
13	(Brazil) Luquinhas	New York Red Bulls	2				1		1		
13	(United States) Sebastian Mendez	D'Feeters Kicks Soccer Club	2	1	1						
13	(United States) Noe Meza	Union Omaha	2			1	1				
13	(United States) Benji Michel	Orlando City SC	2							1	1
13	(United States) Danny Musovski	Los Angeles FC	2			2					
13	(Mexico) Daniel Ríos	Charlotte FC	2				1	1			
13	(Scotland) Johnny Russell	Sporting Kansas City	2					2			
13	(United States) Henrik Sakshaug	San Antonio FC	2		2						
13	(Hungary) Dániel Sallói	Sporting Kansas City	2						2		
13	(Italy) Alessandro Salvadego	Des Moines Menace	2	2							
13	(United States) Khiry Shelton	Sporting Kansas City	2				1		1		
13	(England) Tom Shepherd	Southern States SC	2	2							
13	(United States) Jack Skahan	San Jose Earthquakes	2			1	1				
13	(England) Toby Sims	Pittsburgh Riverhounds SC	2		2						
13	(Spain) Rafael Vacas Barba	The Villages SC	2	2							

== Broadcasting ==
First Round matches were split between ESPN+ and U.S. Soccer's YouTube channel; all matches from the second round to the final were broadcast on ESPN+. This is the final year of a four-year agreement between ESPN and U.S. Soccer to broadcast the tournament. Warner Bros. Discovery Sports will have the rights starting in 2023, as part of an 8-year agreement with U.S. Soccer.
