= 2021 National Amateur Cup =

97th edition of cup competition in American soccer

2021 USASA National Amateur Cup
Tournament details
- Country: United States
- Teams: 46

Final positions
- Champions: Lansdowne Yonkers FC (2nd title)
- Runners-up: Cal FC

Tournament statistics
- Matches played: 50
- Goals scored: 232 (4.64 per match)

The 2021 National Amateur Cup was the 97th edition of the National Amateur Cup, a knockout cup competition open to amateur teams affiliated with the United States Adult Soccer Association (USASA). This is the third edition of the tournament to award its champion a spot in the U.S. Open Cup.

Lansdowne Yonkers FC won their second National Amateur Cup title, defeating Cal FC 2–1 in the final.

== Format ==
All four regions of the USASA will hold tournaments to crown champions, which would then qualify for the final tournament. Qualification for these regionals was determined individually. The final four teams then compete in a single location knockout tournament to determine a national champion, with an additional game in place to crown both third and fourth place.

== Region I ==
Eight associations in USASA Region I sent representatives to the tournament for the Fritz Marth Amateur Cup. Due to the 2020 tournament's cancelation, five associations elected to send both their 2020 and 2021 amateur cup champions increasing the field to 13 teams.

The final of the regional tournament took place on June 19 at the Ukrainian American Sports Center in North Wales, Pennsylvania.

Home teams listed on top of bracket

First Round; April 11/17/18	Quarterfinals; May 2/9
MA	Safira FC	0
NY	**Lansdowne Yonkers**	**2**
NY	**Lansdowne Yonkers**	**2**
NJ	FC Motown (Note: Match broadcast)	1
**North**
CT	Newtown Pride FC	0
MA	**Brockton FC United**	**5**
MA	**Brockton FC United** (Note: Match broadcast)	**2(5)**
NY	Pancyprian-Freedoms	2(3)
NY	**Pancyprian-Freedoms**	**5**
NJ	Vistula Garfield SC	1
PA	**Steel FC**	**2**
MD	All Stars United	1
PA	Steel FC	1
PA	**West Chester United**	**6**
**South**
VA	Sporting 804 (Note: Originally LOKO Football Club (Virginia) was slatted to take part in the tournament but dropped out)	1
PA	**Vereinigung Erzgebirge**	**5**
PA	**Vereinigung Erzgebirge**	**1***
MD	Christos FC	0

Semifinals; May 23
NY	**Lansdowne Yonkers** (Note: Match broadcast)	**3***
MA	Brockton FC United	2
PA	**West Chester United** (Note: Match broadcast, Source)	**1**
PA	Vereinigung Erzgebirge	0

Final; June 19
NY	**Lansdowne Yonkers**	**3**
PA	West Chester United	1

Bold = winner
* = after extra time, ( ) = penalty shootout score

== Region II ==
In total, 19 teams across eight states signed up to compete in the tournament for the Bill Davey Amateur Cup. The full bracket was revealed on April 2, with the first round acting as "play-in" games for the bracket proper.

The final of the regional tournament took place on June 26 at the SeatGeek Stadium Turf Fields in Bridgeview, Illinois.

First round

April 10	**Livonia City FC (Michigan)**	**3–2**	**(Michigan) Teranga Lions**	Wixom, Michigan
8:00pm (EDT)	Zach Hill 22'; Jacob Kunnath 45+2'; Kyle Johnson 47'	Report	(red card) 58'; 68'; (red card) 77'; 90+2'	Stadium: Total Sports Complex

April 17	**Springfield FC (Illinois)**	**0–0** (a.e.t.) (**5–4** p)	**(Kansas) Focus FC**	Springfield, Illinois
3:00pm (CDT)		Report; PK Shootout		Stadium: SASA Soccer Complex
	**Penalties**
	Penalty scored Penalty missed		Penalty scored Penalty missed

April 17	**Vlora FC (Minnesota)**	**5–0**	**(Minnesota) Turbo Sports FC**	Saint Paul, Minnesota
7:30pm (CDT)	Alvaro Arce; Romaine Garrick; Aldahir Hernandez; Frank Rojas	Report		Stadium: McMurray Athletic Fields

Bracket

Home teams listed on top of bracket

Second Round; Apr. 21–May 2	Quarterfinals; May 12–22
WI	Barron Soccer Team
MN	**Vlora FC**
MN	Vlora FC	1
MN	**FC Minneapolis**	**3**
MN	**FC Minneapolis**	**7**
WI	Hayward Wolfpack FC	1
**West**
WI	**Milwaukee Bavarian**	**4**
WI	United Serbians SC	1
WI	**Milwaukee Bavarian**	**8**
IA	Union Dubuque F.C.	0
IA	**Union Dubuque F.C.** (Note: Sources)	**14**
WI	Spartan Football Club	0
IN	**Fort Wayne Sport Club**	**5**
OH	Cincy SC	0
IN	Fort Wayne Sport Club	2
MI	**Ann Arbor FC**	**3**
MI	**Ann Arbor FC**	**2**
MI	Livonia City FC	1
**East**
IL	Chicago Athletic FC	2
IL	**Springfield FC**	**3**
IL	**Springfield FC**	**2(4)**
IL	RWB Adria	2(1)
IL	**RWB Adria**	**1**
IL	Edgewater Castle FC	0

Semifinals; June 5/12
MN	**FC Minneapolis**	**3**
WI	Milwaukee Bavarian	0
MI	Ann Arbor FC	0
IL	**Springfield FC**	**3**

Final; June 26
MN	FC Minneapolis	0
IL	**Springfield FC**	**2**

Bold = winner
* = after extra time, ( ) = penalty shootout score

== Region III ==
Applications for the Region III tournament closed on May 8. On June 9, the field of eight teams, representing five different states, was announced along with the tournament format. (Note: Originally Kalonji Pro-Profile (Georgia) was scheduled to take part in the tournament but was replaced by Music City SC (Tennessee)) Unlike the other regions, Region III separated its entrants into two groups with each playing three games over two days. The highest finishing team from each group moved on to the Region III Amateur Cup Final on Sunday, June 13.

The regional tournament took place between June 11–13 at the Richard Siegel Soccer Complex in Murfreesboro, Tennessee.

Group A

Pos	Team	Pld	W	D	L	GF	GA	GD	Pts	Final result
1	(Florida) OFC Wolves	3	3	0	0	12	1	+11	9	Advance to Region III Final
2	(South Carolina) Platinum FC	3	2	0	1	9	3	+6	6	
3	(North Carolina) K'Vars FC	3	1	0	2	5	7	−2	3	
4	(Georgia (U.S. state)) Buckhead SC	3	0	0	3	2	17	−15	0	

Source: Match reports
Rules for classification: 1) points; 2) head to head; 3) goal differential.

Home \ Away	PFC	BSC	KFC	OFW
Platinum FC	—	6–0 (Note: USASA Region III incorrectly reported this match finished 3–0. Team social media and independent sources confirm the final score of this match was 6–0 in favor of Platinum FC.)	3–1	—
Buckhead SC	—	—	—	1–7
K'Vars FC	—	4–1	—	0–3
OFC Wolves	2–0	—	—	—

Source: Match reports
Legend: Blue = home team win; Yellow = draw; Red = away team win.

Group B

Pos	Team	Pld	W	D	L	GF	GA	GD	Pts	Final result
1	(Tennessee) Nashville United	3	3	0	0	16	4	+12	9	Advance to Region III Final
2	(North Carolina) Goldsboro Strike Eagles FC	3	2	0	1	13	8	+5	6	
3	(South Carolina) SCU-Heat	3	1	0	2	14	8	+6	3	
4	(Tennessee) Music City SC	3	0	0	3	5	28	−23	0	

Source: Match reports
Rules for classification: 1) points; 2) head to head; 3) goal differential.

Home \ Away	NUN	MSC	GSE	SCU
Nashville United	—	8–1	4–2	—
Music City SC	—	—	—	1–12
Goldsboro Strike Eagles FC	—	8–3	—	3–1
SCU-Heat	1–4	—	—	—

Source: Match reports
Legend: Blue = home team win; Yellow = draw; Red = away team win.

Region III Final

June 13	OFC Wolves (Florida)	2–7	(Tennessee) Nashville United	Murfreesboro, Tennessee
9:00 a.m. CST		Report		Stadium: Richard Siegel Soccer Complex

== Region IV ==
Six teams from two states will compete for the Region IV amateur cup. Only two of the region's 20 member state associations (Colorado Soccer Association and Cal South) will have teams taking part in the tournament, with all five Colorado teams coming from the Colorado Super League.

The final of the regional tournament will take place on June 23 and will be hosted by Cal FC at Orange County Great Park in Irvine, California.

Home teams listed on top of bracket

First Round; May 20–21
CO	**Peak XI FC**	**1**
CO	Guadalajara Denver	0
CO	FC Denver	1
CO	**Harpos FC**	**3***

Second Round; June 3–4
CO	Peak XI FC	0
CA	**Cal FC**	3
CO	Harpos FC	2(0)
CO	**Colorado Rush**	**2(3)**

Final; June 23
CA	**Cal FC**	**2**
CO	Colorado Rush	1

Bold = winner
* = after extra time, ( ) = penalty shootout score

== National Amateur Cup Finals ==
The national finals were held between August 6 and 7 at the SeatGeek Stadium Turf Fields in Bridgeview, Illinois, a suburb of Chicago. Lansdowne Yonkers FC won the championship for a second time in five years by beating Cal FC, 2–1. As champion Lansdowne receives a spot in the 2022 U.S. Open Cup and $7,000. Cal receives $5,000 as runner-up while Springfield FC and Nashville United each receive $3,500 as semifinalists.

Semifinals; August 6
CA	**Cal FC**	**4**
IL	Springfield FC	2
NY	**Lansdowne Yonkers**	**1**
TN	Nashville United	0

Final; August 7
CA	Cal FC	1
NY	**Lansdowne Yonkers**	**2**
