= David Greczek =

American soccer player

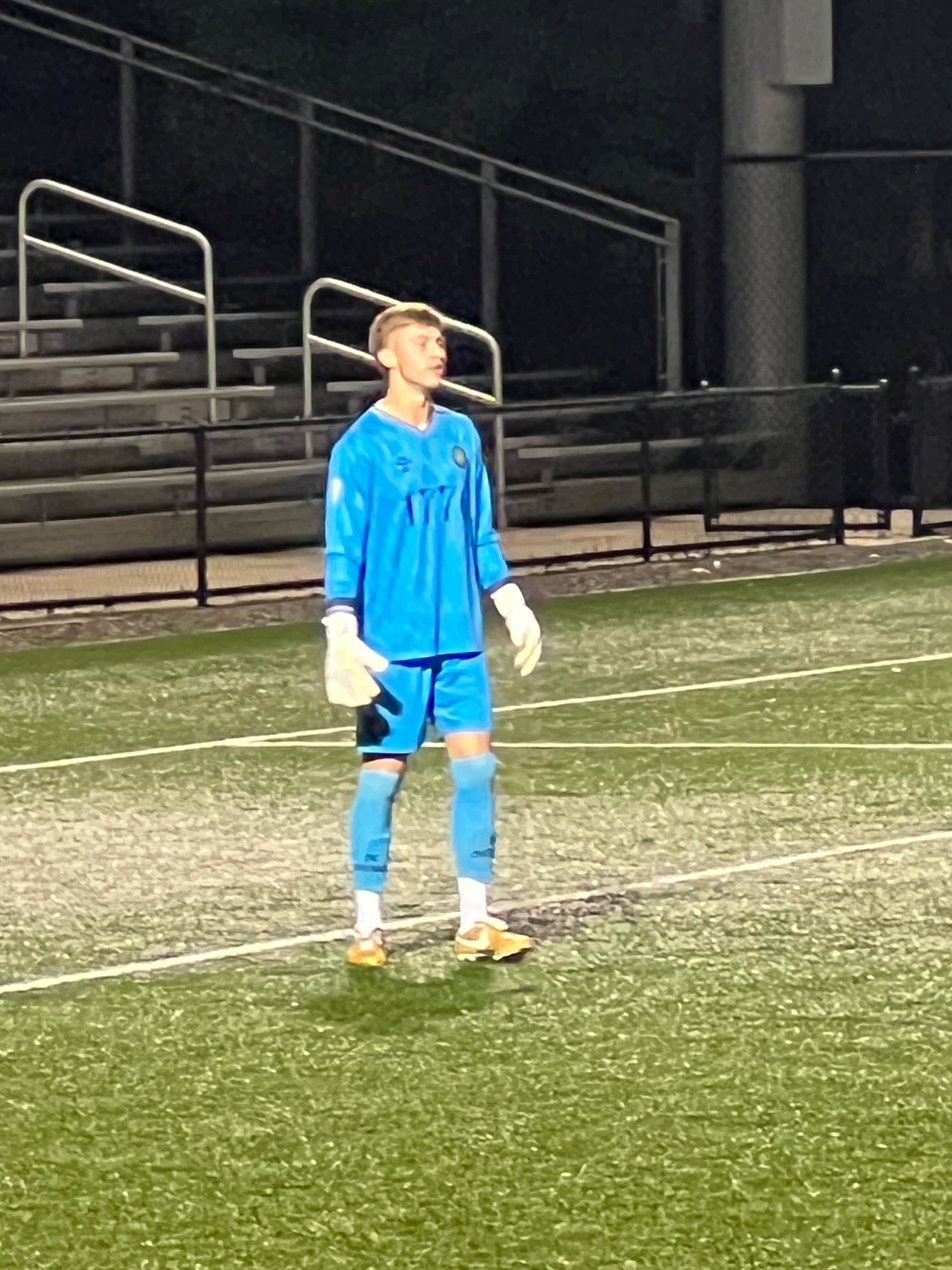
- David Greczek playing for FC Motown in 2023

Personal information
- Date of birth: October 29, 1994 (age 32)
- Place of birth: Fairfield, New Jersey, United States
- Height: 1.88 m (6 ft 2 in)
- Position: Goalkeeper

Team information
- Current team: FC Motown

College career
Years	Team	Apps	(Gls)
2013–2016	Rutgers Scarlet Knights	75	(0)

Senior career*
Years	Team	Apps	(Gls)
2016	Jersey Express	7	(0)
2017	Swope Park Rangers	3	(0)
2019	FC Motown	7	(0)
2019	Greenville Triumph	0	(0)
2021–	FC Motown		
- * Club domestic league appearances and goals as of 18:25, 5 September 2019 (UTC)

David Greczek (born October 29, 1994) is an American professional soccer player who plays as a goalkeeper for FC Motown.

== Career ==
=== College and youth ===
Greczek grew up in Fairfield Township, Essex County, New Jersey and attended West Essex High School. He played four years of college soccer at Rutgers University between 2013 and 2016. While at college, Greczek also appeared for USL PDL side Jersey Express in 2016.

=== Professional ===
On January 17, 2017, Greczek was drafted in the third-round (58th overall) during the 2017 MLS SuperDraft by Sporting Kansas City. He signed with Kansas City's United Soccer League affiliate club Swope Park Rangers on February 8, 2017.

Ahead of the 2019 season, Greczek signed for NPSL team FC Motown.

On September 5, 2019, he joined USL League One club Greenville Triumph SC. However, he failed to make an appearance for Greenville.

Ahead of the 2021 season, Greczek rejoined FC Motown.
