= 2019 Hank Steinbrecher Cup =

Tournament details
- Country: United States of America
- Dates: May 31 – June 1, 2019
- Teams: 4

Final positions
- Champions: Flint City Bucks (third title)

Tournament statistics
- Matches played: 4
- Goals scored: 17 (4.25 per match)

The 2019 Hank Steinbrecher Cup was the seventh edition of the United States Adult Soccer Association's (USASA) tournament whose winner is recognized with the title of U.S. National Amateur Champions.

USL League Two (USL L2) side Flint City Bucks are the defending champion.

== Host selection ==
Milwaukee Bavarian SC was selected to host the tournament.

== Teams ==
The tournament featured the 2018 USASA National Amateur Cup winner Milwaukee Bavarian SC and the defending Steinbrecher Cup winner Flint City Bucks, rebranded from Michigan Bucks. Ordinarily the tournament would have featured the 2018 PDL champion Calgary Foothills FC and the 2018 National Professional Soccer League (NPSL) champion Miami FC 2, but Calgary was ineligible due to being based in Canada and Miami was ineligible due to being a professional club. In their place, PDL runner-up Reading United AC and NPSL runner-up FC Motown were invited. Chicago FC United 2018 PDL National Semi-Finalist took the USL League 2 spot after Reading elected not to participate.

== Matches ==
=== Bracket ===
The semifinal draw was held on March 1.

Semifinals
USL2 | Chicago FC United | 3
NAC | Milwaukee Bavarian SC | 2
NPSL | FC Motown | 1
Def. | Flint City Bucks | 4

Final
USL2 | Chicago FC United | 0
Def. | Flint City Bucks | 3
Third Place
NPSL | FC Motown | 3
NAC | Milwaukee Bavarian SC | 1

* = after extra time

=== Semifinals ===
| May 31, 2019 | Chicago FC United | 3-2 | Milwaukee Bavarian SC | Glendale, Wisconsin |
| | | Report | | Stadium: Bavarian Sports Complex |

| May 31, 2019 | FC Motown | 1-4 | Flint City Bucks | Glendale, Wisconsin |
| | 77' | Report | Timmer 42' 90'; Barone 62'; McNitt 77' | Stadium: Bavarian Sports Complex |

=== Third-Place Match ===
| June 1, 2019 | Milwaukee Bavarian SC | 1-3 | FC Motown | Glendale, Wisconsin |
| | | Report | | Stadium: Bavarian Sports Complex |

=== Final ===
| June 1, 2019 | Flint City Bucks | 3-0 | Chicago FC United | Glendale, Wisconsin |
| | Barone 16'; McNitt; Mwambia 38'o.g. | Report | | Stadium: Bavarian Sports Complex |

== See also ==
- 2018 NPSL season
- 2018 PDL season
