= Nii Armah Ashitey (footballer) =

Togolese footballer

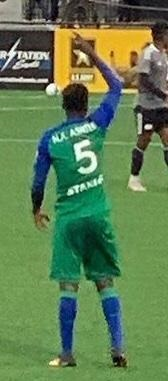
- Ashitey with Hartford Athletic in 2021

Personal information
- Full name: Samuel Nii Armah Ashitey
- Date of birth: 1 March 2000 (age 26)
- Place of birth: Ghana
- Height: 1.78 m (5 ft 10 in)
- Position: Defensive midfielder

Team information
- Current team: FC Motown

Youth career
- Still Believe FC

Senior career*
Years	Team	Apps	(Gls)
2015–2018	Still Believe FC		
2018	Crystal Palace Ghana		
2019–2020	Dreams FC	10	(0)
2019	→ Berekum Chelsea (loan)	0	(0)
2021	Hartford Athletic	14	(1)
2021-	FC Motown	?	(?)
- * Club domestic league appearances and goals as of 17 June 2024

Samuel Nii Armah Ashitey (born 1 March 2000) is a Ghanaian footballer who plays as a midfielder for National Premier Soccer League (NPSL) and USL League Two side FC Motown.

== Career ==
=== Ghana ===
Ashitey made his debut in 2016 for Still Believe F.C. and eventually reached the Ghanaian Premier League in 2018 with Crystal Palace FC. During the 2019 season, he signed with Dreams FC, and was loaned out to Berekum Chelsea, where he took part in the 2019 U-20 Viareggio Cup. He had a stellar tournament, playing all five games in Breekum Chelsea's run to the quarterfinals. He earned man of the match honors twice in games against Brazil's Atletico Paranaense and Seria A team Spezia Calcio. Ashitey returned to Dreams FC and played in 8 games during the 2020 season before it was cancelled due to the COVID-19 pandemic.

=== Hartford Athletic ===
On 6 January 2021, Ashitey signed with USL Championship side Hartford Athletic. He made his debut on 30 April 2021, starting in a 3–2 win over New York Red Bulls II and was subsequently named to the USL Championship Team of the Week.
