= MSU Soccer Park at Pittser Field =

Soccer Park

MSU Soccer Park
- The Mini Fortress
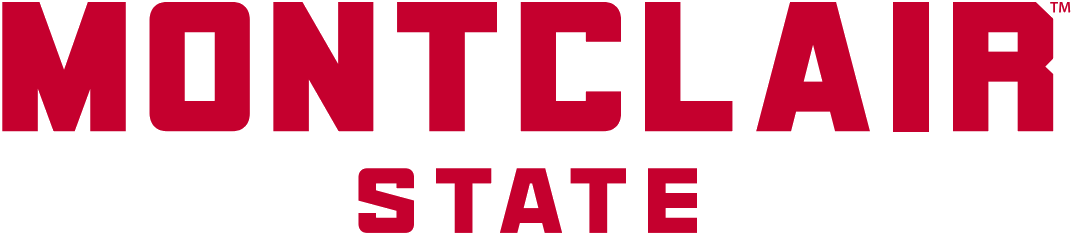

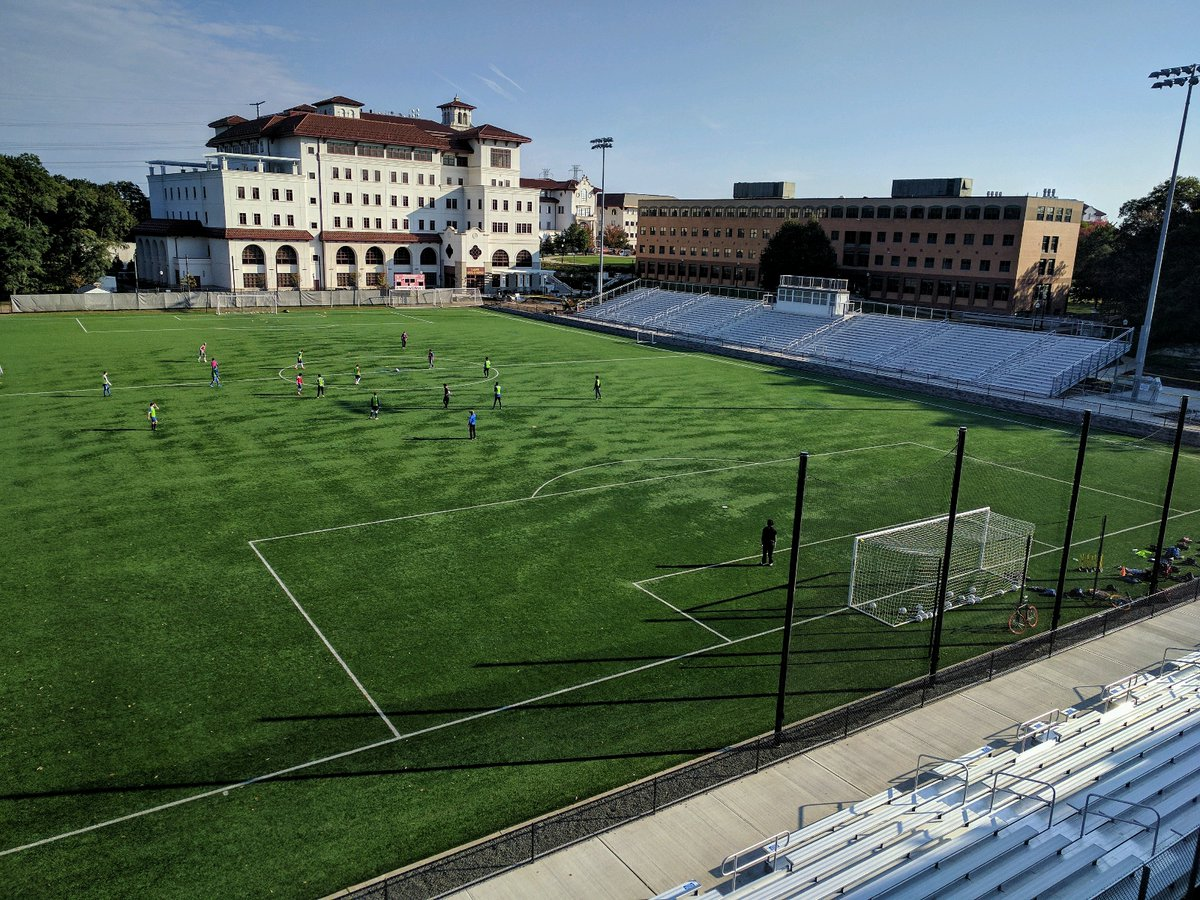
- The stadium in 2016
- Interactive map of MSU Soccer Park
- Full name: MSU Soccer Park at Pittser Field
- Location: 1 Normal Avenue; Montclair, New Jersey 07043
- Coordinates: 40.860694°N 74.200555°W
- Owner: Montclair State University
- Operator: Montclair State University
- Capacity: 5,000
- Type: Soccer-specific stadium
- Surface: FieldTurf
- Field size: 120 yd × 75 yd (110 m × 69 m)
- Current use: Soccer

Construction
- Opened: 1998; 28 years ago
- Expanded: 2016, 2018

Tenants
- Montclair State Red Hawks (NCAA) (1998–present); New York Red Bulls II (MLSNP) (2017–present); New York Red Bulls U-23 (USL2) (2017–present); FC Motown (NPSL/USL2) (2022–present, part-time); Gotham FC (NWSL) (2020–2021)

Website
- montclairathletics.com/msu-soccer-park

MSU Soccer Park at Pittser Field is a soccer-specific stadium on the campus of Montclair State University in Montclair, New Jersey. The stadium serves as home to the Montclair Red Hawks men's and women's soccer teams, although it has also been a frequent venue for professional soccer teams.

== History ==
Built on the site of a former baseball field, MSU Soccer Park opened in 1998 as the home of the Montclair State Red Hawks men's and women's soccer teams.

From 2007 to 2013, Montclair State was the training site for the Major League Soccer club New York Red Bulls while their Red Bull Training Facility was constructed in nearby Hanover Township, New Jersey. The Red Bulls helped finance the construction of a new field house, as well as the installation of a FIFA approved FieldTurf surface at MSU Soccer Park. Lights were installed in 2012 allowing for night matches to be played.

In 2016 it was announced that the Red Bulls' USL Championship affiliate club, New York Red Bulls II, would move into MSU Soccer Park in 2017. To accommodate the Red Bulls II, MSU Soccer Park underwent significant renovations to keep the facility in line with stadium standards set by the United States Soccer Federation for lower division professional soccer clubs. MSU Soccer Park's capacity was expanded to 3,000 seats for the 2017 season and again by 1,500 seats in 2018 bringing the total capacity to 5,000 seats. In addition to the expanded seating capacity, the club built new locker rooms adjacent to the playing field and upgraded the FieldTurf playing surface. The renovations were made ahead of and during the 2018 USL season, forcing the Red Bulls II to play their first six home matches at Red Bull Arena.

In December 2016, Major League Soccer Commissioner Don Garber, a Montclair resident, became the first season ticketholder for Red Bulls II at MSU Soccer Park. At this event, it was also announced that MSU Soccer Park would host select matches for New York Red Bulls U-23, the MLS franchise's affiliate club in USL League Two.

In 2020, Gotham FC played two matches at MSU Soccer Park on October 3 and October 10 as part of the National Women's Soccer League Fall Series. This abbreviated season series was held following the onset of the COVID-19 pandemic which cancelled the regular season. Gotham FC had to play at MSU instead of Red Bull Arena due to scheduling conflicts with the New York Red Bulls and New York City FC sharing that facility at the time.

In 2022, FC Motown became part time tenants of MSU Soccer Park with their National Premier Soccer League (NPSL) and USL League Two teams playing part of their regular season schedules at the facility. Their NPSL team has also hosted several U.S. Open Cup matches at the park. On August 6, 2022, FC Motown won the 2022 National Premier Soccer League Championship, their first title in club history, by defeating Crossfire Redmond 4–3.

== Notable matches ==
- Winning teams in **bold**

Date	Teams	Event	Att.	Ref.
May 7, 2019	**New York Red Bulls U-23** 4–4 FC Motown	2019 U.S. Open Cup; First Round	302	
Jun 11, 2019	New York Red Bulls 2–3 **New England Revolution**	2019 U.S. Open Cup; Fourth Round	2,185	
Apr 20, 2021	**Gotham FC** 4–3 North Carolina Courage	2021 NWSL Challenge Cup	n/a	
May 2, 2021	Gotham FC 0–0 Racing Louisville FC	2021 NWSL Challenge Cup	n/a	
Mar 23, 2022	FC Motown 2–3 **West Chester United SC**	2022 U.S. Open Cup; First Round	323	
Apr 1, 2022	**FC Motown** 1–0 West Chester United SC	2022 U.S. Open Cup; First Round Replay	176	
Apr 6, 2022	**FC Motown** 1–0 AC Syracuse Pulse	2022 U.S. Open Cup; Second Round	50	
May 25, 2022	**New York Red Bulls** 3–1 Charlotte FC	2022 U.S. Open Cup; Round of 16	3,500	
Aug 6, 2022	**FC Motown** 4–3 Crossfire Redmond	2022 NPSL; National Championship	2,065	
May 9, 2023	**New York Red Bulls** 1–0 D.C. United	2023 U.S. Open Cup; Round of 32	2,396	
Nov 4, 2023	**Montclair State Red Hawks** 4–2 Rowan University	NJAC Men's Soccer Championship	827	
Mar 20, 2024	**New York Red Bulls II** 5–1 Hudson Valley Hammers	2024 U.S. Open Cup; First Round	1,073	
Mar 21, 2024	FC Motown 0–3 **New York City FC II**	2024 U.S. Open Cup; First Round	450	
Mar 18, 2025	FC Motown 0–1 **Westchester SC**	2025 U.S. Open Cup; First Round	534	
