= Salvador Pliego =

Mexican footballer

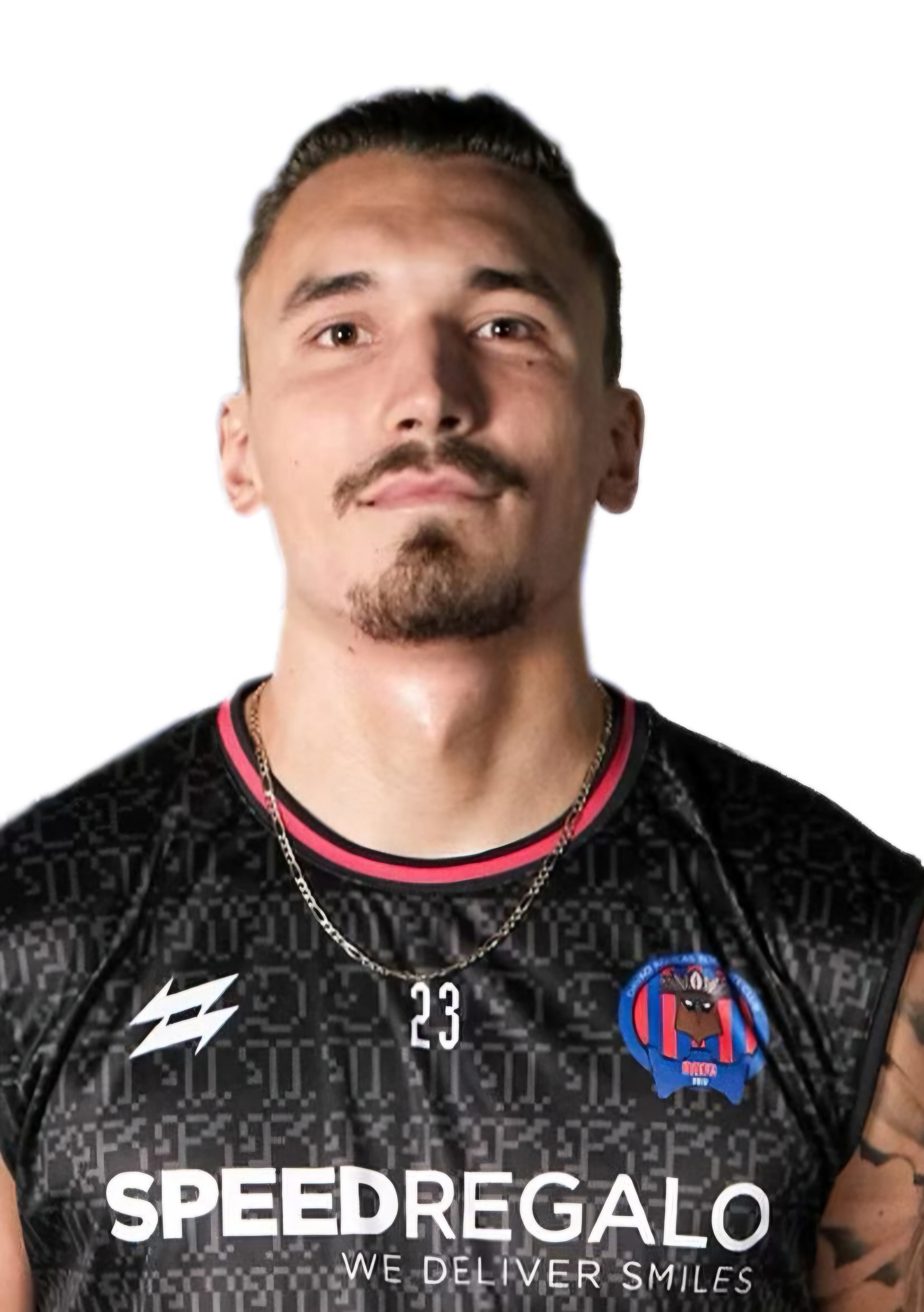

Personal information
- Date of birth: 10 January 2001 (age 25)
- Place of birth: Mexico City, Mexico
- Height: 1.98 m (6 ft 6 in)
- Positions: Centre-back; left-back; defensive midfielder

Senior career*
Years	Team	Apps	(Gls)
2022	FC Weesen	4	(0)
2022–2023	FK Kozara Gradiška	8	(1)
2023–2024	FK Alfa Modriča	14	(0)
2024–2025	Davao Aguilas F.C.	4	(0)
2026–	FC Motown		
- * Club domestic league appearances and goals as of 9 October 2026

Salvador Pliego (born 10 January 2001) is a Mexican professional footballer who plays as a left centre-back. He most recently played for FC Motown in the National Premier Soccer League.

== Club career ==
=== Youth ===
Pliego joined the New York Red Bulls academy in 2014, winning the 2015 Regional and National Championships, leaving the club in 2016. He joined TSF Academy in 2017, before joining Pumas UNAM in 2018. He played for the Pumas Premier (reserve team) in Liga Premier de México winning the 2019 league championship. He joined Saint Louis FC in 2020, before moving to CD Leganés in Spain later that year.

=== FC Weesen ===
On 21 February 2022, Pliego signed for FC Weesen in Weesen, Switzerland. He played in four matches for the club.

=== FK Kozara Gradiška ===
On 22 July 2022, Pliego signed for FK Kozara Gradiška in Gradiška, Bosnia and Herzegovina. Pliego made his debut against Sloboda Novi Grad. Pliego scored a goal against FK Sutjeska Foča.

=== FK Alfa Modriča ===
On 22 September 2023, Pliego signed for FK Alfa Modriča in Modriča, Bosnia and Herzegovina. Pliego had 14 appearances for the club and accumulated 1450 minutes of playing time.

=== Davao Aguilas FC ===
On 1 August 2024, Pliego signed for the first division team Davao Aguilas F.C. in Philippines. Pliego had 4 appearances for the club.

=== FC Motown ===
Pliego appeared for FC Motown, an amateur American side that competes in the National Premier Soccer League, during a 2027 U.S. Open Cup Second Qualifying Round match. He started the match on 4 October 2026 against SC Vistula Garfield, playing over 120 minutes in the loss before being sent off for a second yellow card in extra time.

== International career ==
In August 2015, Pliego was called up to the U.S. U-14 National Team training camp in Carson, California.

In December 2016, Pliego was called up to the Mexico U-16 National Team training camp in Mexico City. He was also called up to two other training camps in February and March 2017.

== Honours ==
=== Club ===
- 2018–19 Liga Premier de México champion

== Career statistics ==
=== Club ===
As of match played 12 December 2024

Appearances and goals by club, season and competition
Club	Season	League	League		Cup		Continental		Total	
Club	Season	League	Apps	Goals	Apps	Goals	Apps	Goals	Apps	Goals
FC Weesen	2021–22	2. Liga Interregional	4	0	–		–		4	0
FK Kozara Gradiška	2022–23	First League of RS	8	1	–		–		8	1
FK Alfa Modriča	2023–24	First League of RS	14	0	–		–		14	0
Davao Aguilas F.C.	2024-25	Philippines Football League	4	0					4	0
Tlaxcala F.C.	2025-	Liga de Expansión MX								
Career total			30	1	–		–		30	1
