= FC Motown =

- Full name: FC Morristown Celtics
- Nickname: Motown
- Founded: 2012; 14 years ago
- Stadium: Ranger Stadium; Madison, New Jersey; MSU Soccer Park; Montclair, New Jersey
- Capacity: 1,200 (Ranger); 5,000 (MSU)
- Owner(s): Dan Karosen; Scott Kindzierski
- Head coach: Touré Weaver
- League: National Premier Soccer League
- 2024: 1st, Keystone East Conf. Playoffs: National Final
- Website: fcmotownsoccer.com
Home colors	Away colors

FC Motown STA
- Full name: FC Morristown STA
- Nicknames: Motown, STA
- Founded: 2021
- Stadium: Ranger Stadium; Madison, New Jersey; MSU Soccer Park; Montclair, New Jersey
- Capacity: 1,200 (Ranger); 5,000 (MSU)
- Owner(s): Dan Karosen; Scott Kindzierski; Shane Bullock
- Head coach: Tom Shields
- League: USL League Two
- 2024: 2nd, Metropolitan Div. Playoffs: Conf. Qualifying Round
- Website: stasoccer.org

FC Motown is an American soccer club based in Morristown, New Jersey. Founded in 2012, the team currently fields teams in both the National Premier Soccer League (NPSL) and USL League Two. In 2020, the team formed a U23 side that competes in the EDP 23U league.

The team plays its home games at Drew University's Ranger Stadium and Montclair State University's MSU Soccer Park. Since 2024, the club's NPSL team has been coached by former New York Red Bulls player Dilly Duka.

Motown has one league championship in the franchise history, winning the 2022 National Premier Soccer League National Championship.

== History ==
=== Early years and state leagues ===
FC Morristown was founded in 2012 by Scott Kindzierski and Dan Karosen and began playing in the Garden State Soccer League (GSSL), an amateur soccer league governed by the New Jersey Soccer Association (NJSA) and the United States Adult Soccer Association (USASA).

The team's first head coach was former New York Red Bulls Homegrown player Šaćir Hot. The organization fielded a team in the GSSL up until the end of the 2021–22 season, winning the Super Division eight times in that span (2014, 2015, 2016, 2017, 2018, 2019, 2020, and 2022). Entering the 2018 season, Motown held a 23-game undefeated streak in the GSSL before falling to Jackson Lions FC in the middle of the season.

Motown regularly entered its GSSL team into the NJSA Men's Open State Cup, which it won on four occasions (2018, 2020, 2021, and 2022). In addition the team was also a Fricker Cup Region 1 finalist in 2016 and regional semifinalist in 2017. The team was also an Amateur Cup Region 1 semifinalist in 2014 and 2015.

In 2018, Motown joined the Northeast Elite Soccer League (NESL) – a league founded by members of USASA Region I that was to be played alongside the team's regular seasons. Motown partnered with fellow New Jersey amateur side Jackson Lions FC to form Motown Lions, which won the inaugural NESL Championship over West Chester United SC, 3–1. Motown and Jackson separated for the 2019 NESL season, which saw Motown return to the league final but lose in a rematch against West Chester, 3–2. Due to COVID and other circumstances the league ceased play in 2021.

While fully amateur, the team qualified for the 2017 U.S. Open Cup by beating tournament regular Lansdowne Bhoys FC, 3–2. The team advanced to the second round by beating NPSL side New Jersey Copa FC, 2–1, before falling to Rochester Rhinos of the United Soccer League, 3–0.

In 2017, the team began working with NPSL side Clarkstown SC Eagles and supplied most of Clarkstown's players and staff.

In 2020, Motown formed a U23 team which competes in the EDP. The team went 7–0 in its first season, winning the Men's Central Red Division.

=== 2018 ===
On December 6, 2017, the NPSL announced Clarkstown SC Eagles would officially rebrand as FC Motown for 2018. Like Clarkstown, Motown would also compete in the league's Keystone Conference in the Northeast Region. Hot remained the team's head coach in the NPSL and GSSL.

Motown qualified for the 2018 U.S. Open Cup via the automatic bid Clarkstown had earned with its 2017 results. The team defeated New York Red Bulls U-23 of the Premier Development League at Ranger Stadium in the First Round, 2–1, thanks to a first half brace from former professional Dilly Duka. In the Second Round, Motown hosted Penn FC of the second division United Soccer League at Ranger Stadium. Duka scored to give the team a lead but three goals in the last eleven minutes eliminated Motown, 3–1.

In the regular season, Motown finished first in the Keystone Conference with nine wins and one loss. In the conference playoffs, the team beat fourth seed FC Monmouth in the semifinal before beating West Chester United SC in the final via a penalty kick shootout to capture its first Keystone Conference title. In the Northeast Region Playoffs, second seed Motown beat third seed FC Baltimore and first seed New York Cosmos B to win its first regional championship. In the national semifinal, Motown hosted FC Mulhouse Portland at Ranger Stadium and won in extra time, 2–1.

In the 2018 NPSL National Championship game, top seed Motown hosted second seed Miami FC 2 – which had played professionally in the North American Soccer League the previous season. Motown lost, 3–1, in front of a sold-out crowd of 2,143 at Ranger Stadium.

=== 2019 ===
In the 2019 U.S. Open Cup, Motown once again faced New York Red Bulls U-23 of USL League Two, formerly known as the PDL, in the First Round. Playing as the away team at MSU Soccer Park, Motown lost on penalty kicks, 4–4 (5:3 pks), in front of over 300 people.

Motown finished the regular season third in the Keystone Conference with six wins, one draw, and three loses. In the conference playoffs, third seed Motown beat second seed West Chester United SC, 3–2. The team hosted the conference final versus fourth seed Philadelphia Lone Star FC and won, 2–0, for its second straight Keystone championship. In the Northeast Region Semifinal, third seed Motown lost to second seed FC Baltimore, 1–0.

=== 2020 ===
Motown qualified for the 2020 U.S. Open Cup and was scheduled to host local qualifier New York Pancyprian-Freedoms in the First Round, with the winner hosting USL Championship side Saint Louis FC in the Second Round. However the tournament was suspended in mid-March and eventually cancelled in August due to the COVID-19 pandemic.

In late March, the 2020 NPSL season was also cancelled due to COVID. Motown did continue to play in state leagues however, winning the GSSL Super Division and NJSA Men's Open State Cup later in the year once play resumed.

=== 2021 ===
NPSL

The team returned to NPSL play in the Keystone Conference following the COVID stoppage. The regular season saw Motown finish third in the conference with seven wins, two draws, and one loss. In the conference playoffs, third seed Motown beat second seed Atlantic City FC on the road, 3–2, behind three first half goals from Marcus Hackett, Roy Boateng, and Ryan Peterson. In the conference final, Motown hosted fourth seed FC Monmouth at MSU Soccer Park and won, 2–0, off a brace from Peterson. The team entered the Northeast Region Playoffs, hosted by FC Baltimore Christos, as the third seed. In the semifinals, Motown beat second seed Georgia Revolution FC, 2–1, off a late goal from Boateng. In the region final, Motown lost to first seed Baltimore Christos, 3–3 (4:3 on penalty kicks).

USL

On January 13, 2021, USL League Two announced FC Motown as its latest expansion side and would compete in the Metropolitan Division beginning in the 2021 season alongside teams like the Long Island Rough Riders, Morris Elite SC, and New York Red Bulls U-23. Northern Ireland native and NPSL assistant coach Alan McClintock was named inaugural head coach of the USL side on March 15, 2021.

In the regular season, Motown finished fifth in the Metropolitan Division and missed the playoffs.

=== 2022 ===
NPSL

Following two cancelled editions of the tournament Motown returned to the U.S. Open Cup in 2022. The team achieved its best performance in the tournament to date, reaching the Third Round and earning $25,000 as the farthest reaching Open Division that year. Motown beat West Chester in the First Round at Montclair State following a protest and replay in only the second successful protest in the tournament since 1995. Motown hosted National Independent Soccer Association side AC Syracuse Pulse in the Second Round and earned its first win over a professional side, 1–0 AET, but lost on the road to Rochester New York FC (formerly the Rochester Rhinos) in penalty kicks in the next round.

Hot and the team parted ways following the USOC. Gideon Baah, a former New York Red Bulls player who'd been playing with the side in the competition, was named the NPSL team's new head coach ahead of the regular season.

Motown finished the regular season first in the Keystone Conference, beating out Electric City Shock SC on tiebreakers for the first seed. In the conference playoffs, Motown beat Pennsylvania side Philadelphia Ukrainian Nationals and West Chester United to capture the conference championship. In the Northeast Region Playoffs, top seed Motown beat the New York Shockers and Appalachian FC at home to claim the organization's second-ever regional championship. The team's only road game in the playoffs came in the national final four, where third seed Motown beat second seed Tulsa Athletic, 2–1.

In the 2022 NPSL National Championship game, Motown beat fourth seed Crossfire Redmond, 4–3, in front of 2,065 fans at MSU Soccer Park. Coby Handy Jean Rodriguez was named Man of the Match for scoring a late brace to equalize and eventually win the team's first-ever national title.

USL

On January 17, it was announced that Motown's USL League Two team would be partnered with youth club STA Soccer. The team was renamed to FC Motown STA. Former Rutgers Scarlet Knights men's soccer assistant coach and STA Technical Director Tom Shields was named the team's head coach.

In the regular season, STA finished seventh in the Metropolitan Division and missed the playoffs. Peter Stroud was named to the USL League Two All-Conference team (Eastern) and the All-League team.

=== 2023 ===
NPSL

In the 2023 U.S. Open Cup, Motown lost in the First Round to USL League Two side Manhattan SC in extra time, 2–1.

This season, the NPSL split the Keystone Conference in two to form the Keystone West Conference and the Keystone East Conference. Motown, playing in the latter, finished the regular season in first place and undefeated. The team beat second seed Atlantic City FC to win the Keystone East Conference championship. In the East Region Playoffs, Motown beat Hartford City FC in the semifinals but lost to rivals West Chester United in the regional final, 4–1.

Following the playoff exit, Baah announced he was leaving the head coaching role.

USL

In the regular season, STA finished sixth in the Metropolitan Division and missed the playoffs.

=== 2024 ===
NPSL

On January 5, 2024, former Motown captain and Major League Soccer midfielder Dilly Duka was named the third-ever coach of Motown's first team.

Motown qualified for its seven straight U.S. Open Cup tournament in 2024, falling to Division III professional side New York City FC II of MLS Next Pro, 3–0, in the First Round.

In the regular season, the team went undefeated in the Keystone East Conference. Haitian midfielder Maudwindo Germain was named the conference's Most Valuable Player. Motown entered the conference playoffs as the top seed, beating Jackson Lions FC in the final for its sixth straight conference championship. In the East Region playoffs, #1 seed Motown beat Virginia Dream FC off a second half goal past former D.C. United and United States men's national soccer team keeper Bill Hamid. The team won its third regional championship in team history by beating New York Shockers, 5–0, in the final.

Motown reached the 2024 NPSL National Championship Game by beating Columbus United FC, 2–0, at Drew University in the National Semifinals. Hosting its third-ever NPSL Final, Motown lost, 2–1, to El Farolito in front of 1,300 fans at Rangers Stadium.

USL

Motown STA competed in the USL's Metropolitan Division, finishing the regular season in second place with a record of eight wins, three draws, and one loss. The team qualified for the USL League Two postseason for the first time as a wildcard. In the Eastern Conference Qualifying Round STA went on the road and led Western Mass Pioneers late but fell in extra time, 3–1.

== Players & staff ==
=== Current squad ===
NPSL

As of October 3, 2024

Note: Flags indicate national team as defined under FIFA eligibility rules; some limited exceptions apply. Players may hold more than one non-FIFA nationality.

No.	Pos.	Nation	Player
1	GK	USA	David Greczek
2	DF	USA	Brian Paredes
3	DF	HAI	Jean Voltaire
4	FW	MAR	El Mahdi Youssoufi
4	MF	USA	Danny Cordeiro
6	DF	USA	Mike da Fonte
7	FW	USA	Joe Fala
8	FW	USA	Ryan Peterson
9	MF	SEN	Babacar Diene
10	MF	HAI	Junior Delva

No.	Pos.	Nation	Player
13	DF	USA	Marcus Hackett
16	MF	USA	Coby Rodriguez
17	MF	USA	Jason Bouregy
18	FW	SEN	Ben Assane
19	DF	USA	Zach Perez
20	FW	USA	Hayden Criollo
21	FW	USA	Franco Catania
22	MF	GHA	Nii Ashitey
23	MF	HAI	Nerlin Saint-Vil
25	MF	HAI	Samuel Pompée
27	FW	ENG	Joe Holland

USL

As of July 16, 2024

Note: Flags indicate national team as defined under FIFA eligibility rules; some limited exceptions apply. Players may hold more than one non-FIFA nationality.

No.	Pos.	Nation	Player
—	MF	USA	Matthew Acosta
—	MF	USA	Justin Aguirre-Rosas
—	DF	USA	Zachary Barrett
—	MF	USA	Liam Beckwith
—	MF	USA	Jason Bouregy
—	GK	USA	Evan Chomow
—	DF	USA	Nick Collins
—	FW	USA	Thomas Cooklin Levey
—	MF	USA	Nick Cruz
—	MF	USA	Miguel Diaz
—	GK	USA	Ryan Friedberg
—	FW	USA	Micaah Garnette
—	FW	USA	Charles Giordano
—	DF	USA	Ethan Hagen
—	FW	USA	Charlie Herley
—	DF	USA	Elijah Hope
—	FW	USA	Daniel Ittycheria
—	DF	USA	Maximus Jennings
—	GK	USA	Shane Keenan

No.	Pos.	Nation	Player
—	DF	USA	Jack Kelesoglu
—	DF	USA	Bryce LeBel
—	MF	USA	Noah Levy
—	DF	USA	Maxwell Murray
—	FW	USA	Nicolas Née
—	DF	USA	Joaquin Niehenke
—	DF	USA	Patrick O'Toole
—	FW	USA	Kasper Piela
—	FW	USA	Lucas Ross
—	FW	USA	Gabe Ruitenberg
—	DF	USA	Erick Ruiz
—	MF	USA	Adrian Saad
—	GK	ENG	Ben Voase
—	DF	USA	Patrick Weir
—	DF	USA	Maurice "Mo" Williams
—	MF	USA	Sam Williams
—	FW	USA	Nate Zimmermann
—	MF	USA	Giacomo Zizza
—	DF	USA	Giovanni Zizza

=== Staff ===
NPSL

- (United States) Dilly Duka - Head coach
- (United States) Touré Weaver - Assistant coach
- (United States) Adam Kelemet - Assistant coach
- (United States) Gregory Irwin - General Manager

USL

- (United States) Tom Shields - Head coach
- (Northern Ireland) Alan McClintock - Assistant coach
- (United States) Zach Roth - Goalkeeper coach
- (United States) Gregory Irwin - General Manager

EDP

- (Northern Ireland) Alan McClintock - Head coach

==== Former head coaches ====
- (United States) Šaćir Hot (2012–2022) NPSL head coach
- (Ghana) Gideon Baah (2022–2024) NPSL head coach
- (Northern Ireland) Alan McClintock (2021–2022) USL head coach

=== Notable players ===
This list of notable former players comprises players who went on to play professional soccer after playing for the team or those who previously played professionally before joining the team.

- (United States) R. J. Allen
- (Ghana) Nii Armah Ashitey
- (Ghana) Gideon Baah
- (Peru) Nelson Becerra
- (Ghana) Roy Boateng
- (United States) Samad Bounthong
- (United States) Mike da Fonte
- (Senegal) Babacar Diene
- (United States) Dilly Duka
- (United States) Kene Eze
- (United States) Joe Fala
- (Haiti) Christiano François
- (United States) Hunter Freeman
- (United States) David Greczek
- (England) Joe Holland
- (Japan) Kodai Iida
- (Trinidad and Tobago) Julius James
- (Republic of Ireland) Daryl Kavanagh
- (United States) Michael Knapp
- (United States) Mitchell Lurie
- (United States) Brendan McSorley
- (United States) Jimmy Mulligan
- (United States) Nicolas Née
- (United States) Zach Perez
- (United States) Ryan Peterson
- (Mexico) Salvador Pliego
- (Haiti) Samuel Pompée
- (Puerto Rico) Sidney Rivera
- (United States) Peter Stroud
- (Cameroon) Tony Tchani
- (Taiwan) Christopher Tiao
- (United States) Cameron Vickers
- (United States) Sam Williams
- (Morocco) El Mahdi Youssoufi

==== All Time MLS Draft Picks ====
Player name	College	Years with Motown (NPSL & USL)	Draft year	Round	Team
Michael Knapp	Montclair State	2019, 2024	2022 MLS SuperDraft	Round 3 (61st overall)	Austin FC
Kyle Linhares	Georgetown	2022, 2023	2024 MLS SuperDraft	Round 2 (40th overall)	Portland Timbers
Maximus Jennings	Georgetown	2022, 2023, 2024	2024 MLS SuperDraft	Round 3 (76th overall)	Real Salt Lake
Brendan McSorley	Providence	2023	2024 MLS SuperDraft	Round 3 (79th overall)	St. Louis City SC
Emil Jääskeläinen	Akron	2023	2025 MLS SuperDraft	Round 1 (7th overall)	St. Louis City SC
Max Murray	Vermont	2024	2025 MLS SuperDraft	Round 1 (17th overall)	New York City FC
Daniel Ittycheria	Princeton	2024	2025 MLS SuperDraft	Round 2 (40th overall)	D.C. United
Samuel Sarver	Indiana	2023	2025 MLS SuperDraft	Round 2 (41th overall)	FC Dallas
Nick Collins	Rutgers	2024	2025 MLS SuperDraft	Round 3 (85th overall)	Minnesota United FC
Tomas Hut	Syracuse	2022	2026 MLS SuperDraft	Round 1 (21st overall)	New York Red Bulls
Kenan Hot	Duke	2021, 2025	2026 MLS SuperDraft	Round 2 (32nd overall)	Inter Miami CF

== Record ==
=== Year-by-year ===
Clarkstown SC Eagles History (2012–2017)
Year	League	Regular season	Playoffs	U.S. Open Cup	Notes
2012	NPSL	3rd, Keystone Conference	Did not qualify	Ineligible	Played as Jersey City Eagles FC
2013	NPSL	3rd, Keystone Conference	Did not qualify	Did not qualify	
2014	NPSL	5th, Keystone Conference	Did not qualify	Did not qualify	
2015	NPSL	1st, Keystone Conference	Regional Final	Did not qualify	Lost in Northeast Regional Final to New York Cosmos B
2016	NPSL	1st, Keystone Conference	National semifinal	1st Round	Lost in National semifinal to AFC Cleveland
2017	NPSL	2nd, Keystone Conference	Northeast Regional Final	1st Round	Lost in Northeast Regional Final to Elm City Express

Note: Clarkstown & Motown history and records are considered separate. However, Motown acquiring Clarkstown's NPSL franchise is officially considered a "rebrand" and the team qualified for the 2018 U.S. Open Cup based on the Eagles' 2017 NPSL results.

FC Motown First Team History
Year	League	Regular season	Playoffs	U.S. Open Cup	Notes
2017	GSSL	1st, Super Division	N/A	2nd Round	Played as a fully amateur side
2018	NPSL	1st, Keystone Conference	National Final	2nd Round	Lost in National Final to Miami FC 2
2019	NPSL	3rd, Keystone Conference	Northeast Regional semifinal	1st Round	Lost in Northeast Regional semifinal to FC Baltimore Christos
2020	NPSL	Season cancelled due to COVID-19 pandemic		Cancelled	
2021	NPSL	3rd, Keystone Conference	East Regional Final	Cancelled	Lost in East Regional Final to FC Baltimore Christos
2022	NPSL	1st, Keystone Conference	Champions	3rd Round	Won National Final versus Crossfire Redmond
2023	NPSL	1st, Keystone East Conference	East Regional Final	1st Round	Lost in Eastern Regional Final to West Chester United SC
2024	NPSL	1st, Keystone East Conference	National Final	1st Round	Lost in National Final to El Farolito
2025	NPSL	2nd, Keystone East Conference	Conference Semifinal	1st Round	Lost in Keystone East Conference Semifinal to Jackson Lions FC
2026	NPSL	4th, Keystone East Conference	Conference Final	1st Round	Lost in Keystone East Conference Final to Ambassadors FC Ohio
2027	NPSL	TBD	TBD	2nd QF Round	

USL League Two
Year	League	Regular season	Playoffs	U.S. Open Cup	Notes
2021	USL League Two	5th, Metropolitan	Did not qualify	Ineligible	
2022	USL League Two	7th, Metropolitan	Did not qualify	Did not qualify	
2023	USL League Two	6th, Metropolitan	Did not qualify	Did not qualify	
2024	USL League Two	2nd, Metropolitan	Conference Qualifying Round	Did not qualify	Lost in Eastern Conference Qualifying Round to Western Mass Pioneers
2025	USL League Two	1st, Metropolitan	Conference Qualifying Round	Did not qualify	Unbeaten Regular Season Champions at 11-1-0, Lost in Eastern Conference Semifinals to Vermont Green FC
2026	USL League Two	1st, Metropolitan	Conference Quarterfinal Round	Did not qualify	Regular Season Champions at 10–1–1, Lost in Conference Quarterfinals to Ocean City Nor'easters

=== Games versus professional and national teams ===
Team	League	Competition	Date	Location	Result	Notes
Ecuador U-20 National Team	Ecuadorian Football Federation	Friendly	September 30, 2016	Central Park Of Morris County in Morris Plains, NJ	N/A	
New York Red Bulls II	United Soccer League	Friendly	March 4, 2017	Red Bull Training Facility in Whippany, NJ	L, 0–5	Preseason
Rochester Rhinos	United Soccer League	U.S. Open Cup	May 17, 2017	Capelli Sport Stadium in Rochester, NY	L, 0–3	Second Round
(Peru) Sport Boys	Peruvian Segunda División	Friendly	August 8, 2017	Cochrane Stadium in Jersey City, NJ	L, 0–4	
New York City FC	Major League Soccer	Friendly	October 7, 2017	Purchase Soccer Field in Purchase, NY	N/A	
Penn FC	United Soccer League	U.S. Open Cup	May 16, 2018	Drew University in Madison, NJ	L, 1–3	Second Round
Ecuador National Team	Ecuadorian Football Federation	Controlled scrimmage	March 24, 2019	Red Bull Training Facility in Whippany, NJ	D, 0–0	
AC Syracuse Pulse	National Independent Soccer Association	U.S. Open Cup	April 6, 2022	MSU Soccer Park in Montclair, NJ	W, 1–0 AET	Second Round
Rochester New York FC	MLS Next Pro	U.S. Open Cup	April 20, 2022	John L. DiMarco Field in Brighton, NY	D, 2–2 (3:4 PK loss)	Third Round
New York City FC II	MLS Next Pro	Friendly	February 11, 2023	Belson Stadium in Queens, NY	D, 2–2	Preseason
New York Red Bulls II	MLS Next Pro	Friendly	March 2, 2024	MSU Soccer Park in Montclair, NJ	L, 1–6	Preseason
New York City FC II	MLS Next Pro	U.S. Open Cup	March 21, 2024	MSU Soccer Park in Montclair, NJ	L, 0–3	First Round
New York City FC II	MLS Next Pro	Friendly	February 8, 2025	MSU Soccer Park in Montclair, NJ	L, 1–3	Preseason
Westchester SC	USL League One	U.S. Open Cup	March 18, 2025	MSU Soccer Park in Montclair, NJ	L, 0–1	First Round
New York Cosmos	USL League One	Friendly	February 28, 2026	Hinchliffe Stadium in Paterson, NJ	L, 0–2	Preseason
Hartford Athletic	USL Championship	U.S. Open Cup	March 18, 2026	Lubetkin Field (NJIT) in Newark, NJ		First Round

== Honors ==
Honor		Champions	Runners-up
National Premier Soccer League	National championship	2022	2018, 2024
National Premier Soccer League	Regional championship	2018, 2022, 2024	2021, 2023
National Premier Soccer League	Conference championship	2018, 2019, 2021, 2022, 2023, 2024	
USL League Two	Division championship	2025	2024

U.S. Open Cup

- Participants (7): 2017, 2018, 2019, 2022, 2023, 2024, 2025, 2026
- Additional qualification (1): 2020

Hank Steinbrecher Cup

- Participants (1): 2019 (3rd Place)

USASA Region I Werner Fricker Open Cup

- Runners-Up (1): 2016

Northeast Elite Super League

- Champions (1): 2018 (as Motown Lions with Jackson Lions FC)
  - Runners-up (1): 2019

New Jersey Soccer Association Men's Open State Cup

- Champions (4): 2018, 2020, 2021, 2022
  - Runners-up (1): 2019

Garden State Soccer League

- Super Division Champions (8): 2014, 2015, 2016, 2017, 2018, 2019, 2020, 2022

Lower League eCup

- PS4 Champions (1): 2020 (Player: Deiver Lopez)
