= FC Minneapolis =

- Full name: Football Club Minneapolis
- Nickname: The City Lions
- Founded: 2014; 12 years ago
- Stadium: Crimson Stadium, Maple Grove Senior High School
- Capacity: 4,000
- Sporting Director: David Adeola Oluwalaanu
- Head Coach: Ian Sendi
- League: UPSL
- 2021: 4th, Midwest Conference; Playoffs: Division Semis
- Website: http://www.fcminneapolis.com
Home colors	Away colors

FC Minneapolis (known informally as FCM or The City Lions) is an American soccer team based in Minneapolis, Minnesota, United States. Founded in 2014, the team plays in the United Premier Soccer League, a national league at the fourth tier of the American Soccer Pyramid.

== History ==
Founded in 2014 as a member of the Minnesota Recreational Soccer League, playing in the Sunday Division One, the club's mission was to provide a quality, accessible and equitable pathway to professional football for all players in the United States. As such, in 2015, the club became one of the founding members of the now defunct American Premier League, becoming league champions in their inaugural season and finishing 5th position out of five teams in 2016. The club is partially owned by "supporter group members" who make game related decisions for the team, such as the team jersey, game day amenities, and future opponents for friendly matches. In 2018, they joined the United Premier Soccer League. In 2019, they finished their spring season of the Midwest Conference West Division at four wins, three draws and three losses, good for third place in the league. Their first competitive game of the United Premier Soccer League was a 5-4 loss against Granite City FC in St. Cloud, Minnesota. The club's first goal of the United Premier Soccer League was scored by Lorestho Banks in their away match, a 5–4 defeat to Granite City FC at Huskys Dome of St. Cloud State University.

== Honors ==
- 2019 U.S. National Cup Regional Quarter Finals
- 2020 Minnesota Fall Cup Finals
- 2021 U.S. National Cup Regional Finals
- 2021 UPSL Midwest Conference Division Semi Finals
- 2021 U.S. National Cup Champions of Regions Semi Finals
- 2021 U.S. National Cup Champions of Regions Third Place
- 2022 Minnesota Fall Cup Champions

== Season-by-season ==
Season	Division	League	Wins	Draw	Losses	Regular season	Playoffs	US Open Cup	US National Cup
2014	Recreational	Minnesota Recreational Soccer League (Sunday Division)	0	0	14	8th	Did not qualify	Did not enter	Did not enter
2015	1	American Premier League	4	1	1	1st	Champions	Did not enter	Did not enter
2016	1	American Premier League	0	2	6	5th	Did not qualify	Did not enter	Did not enter
2018	Premier	UPSL (Midwest Conference, North Division)	0	1	9	6th	Did not qualify	Did not enter	Did not enter
2019	Premier	UPSL (Midwest Conference, West Division)	4	3	3	3rd	Did not qualify	Did not enter	Midwest Region Quarterfinals
2021	Premier	UPSL (Midwest Conference, West Division)	4	3	1	4th	Division Semis	Did not enter	Regional Finals
2022	Premier	UPSL (Midwest Conference, West Division)	7	1	2	3rd	Qualified	Did not enter	UPSL Midwest Play Off qualification
2023	Premier	UPSL (Midwest Conference, West Division)	4	0	6	7th	Maintained Position in Premier Division, didn't qualify for playoffs	Did not enter	Did not enter
2024	Premier	UPSL (Midwest Conference, West Division)	1	1	8	10th	Maintained Position in Premier Division, didn't qualify for playoffs	Did not enter	Did not enter
2025	Premier	UPSL (Midwest Conference, West Division)	1	2	7	11th	Did not qualify	Did not enter	Did not enter
2026	Division 1	UPSL (Midwest Conference, West Division)	1	0	10	12th	Relegation Zone	Did not enter	Did not enter

== Roster ==
As of 2025

Note: Flags indicate national team as defined under FIFA eligibility rules. Players may hold more than one non-FIFA nationality.

No.	Position	Nation	Player
1	GK	NGR	Gafar Ayodele
2	MF	CMR	Ramson Ashiley
3	DF	LBR	Emmanuel Menniboe
4	DF	USA	Joel Filiatrault
5	DF	USA	Evan W. Campbell
6	FW	BRA	Josemar Amorim
7	MF	UGA	Ian Sendi
8	MF	UGA	Micheal Ssekitoleko
9	FW	LBR	Blessing Quaqua
10	FW	PER	Jossue Valera
11	FW	USA	Aaron Mackall
18	MF	LBR	Martin Garr
20	MF	COL	Pedro Chacon Silva
21	MF	GUA	Josh A. Gomez
22	FW	LBR	Aerial Gbalenchey
23	DF	USA	Cole J. Madison

== Technical Team ==
- (United States) Ian Sendi - Head Coach
- (Togo) KPATCHA TOYYISON - Assistant Coach & Strength & Conditioning

Coach

- (Nigeria) Oluwalaanu David - Sporting Director
- (Uganda) Ian Sendi - DEVELOPMENT COACH

== Historic record vs opponents ==
Legend
0-0-0	Win–loss-draw
0-0	Win–loss
*	No games played

Opponent	Regular season	Friendly	U.S. Open	U.S National Cup	Playoffs	Total
Minneapolis City SC	0-1-0	0-2-0	*	*	0-1-0	0-4-0
Dakota Fusion	*	0-1-0	*	*	*	0-1-0
Granite City FC	3-2-0	6-0-0	*	*	*	9-2-0
FC Fargo	0-2-0	0-1-0	*	*	*	0-3-0
Minnesota Twinstars FC	0-2-0	1-1-0	*	*	*	1-3-0
Duluth FC	0-2-0	*	*	*	*	0-2-0
Lacrosse Aris FC	0-0-2	*	*	*	*	0-0-2
Green Bay United	0-1-1	*	*	*	*	0-1-1
Milwaukee Bavarian	0-2-0	*	*	1-1-0	*	1-3-0
Madison 56ers	0-2-0	*	*	*	*	0-2-0
Croatian Eagles SC	0-2-0	*	*	*	*	0-2-0
Vlora City FC	2-1-1	1-4-0	*	*	1-0-0	4-5-1
Minnesota United Reserve	*	0-1-0	*	*	*	0-1-0
St. Louis Lions FC	*	0-1-0	*	*	*	0-1-0
FC Wichita	*	0-1-0	*	*	*	0-1-0
Turbo Sports	1-0-2	3-1-0	*	*	*	4-1-2
North Central University	*	1-0-0	*	*	*	1-0-0
Minnesota Cranes	1-1-0	*	*	*	*	1-1-0
Brothers FC	1-0-1	*	*	*	*	1-0-1
Midnimo FC	2-0-0	*	*	*	1-0-0	3-0-0
Dakota Young stars FC	2-1-0	*	*	*	*	2-1-0
Rochester FC	1-1-1	*	*	*	*	1-1-1
Barron SC	*	*	*	1-0-0	*	1-0-0
Spring Field FC	*	*	*	0-1-0	*	0-1-0
ASC New Stars	*	*	*	0-1-0	*	0-1-0
Ann Arbor FC	*	*	*	0-1-0	*	0-1-0
Inter Minneapolis	0-0-1	0-0-2	*	*	*	0-0-3
Minnesota Brooklyn Knights	0-0-1	0-0-1	*	*	*	0-0-2
Total	13-19-10	12-13-4	*-*-*	3-4-0	0-1-0	28-37-14

- Updated to mid of August of 2021
