= Zach Perez =

American soccer player

Personal information
- Full name: Zachary Perez
- Date of birth: November 27, 1996 (age 29)
- Place of birth: Edison, New Jersey, United States
- Height: 5 ft 8 in (1.73 m)
- Position: Defender

Team information
- Current team: FC Motown
- Number: 19

Youth career
- 2014–2015: Philadelphia Union

College career
| Years | Team | Apps | (Gls) |
| 2015–2018 | William Paterson Pioneers | 79 | (3) |

Senior career*
| Years | Team | Apps | (Gls) |
| 2019 | FC Motown | 6 | (0) |
| 2019 | Richmond Kickers | 1 | (0) |
| 2020– | FC Motown | | |
- * Club domestic league appearances and goals as of March 20, 2025

Zach Perez (born November 27, 1996) is an American professional soccer player who plays as a defender for FC Motown.

Raised in Edison, New Jersey, Perez attended Edison High School before transferring to Rutgers Preparatory School.

== Career ==
Perez played college soccer at William Paterson University between 2015 and 2018, making 79 appearances, scoring 3 goals and tallying 6 assists.

Following college, Perez played with National Premier Soccer League side FC Motown during their 2019 season.

On September 5, 2019, Perez signed a professional contract with USL League One side Richmond Kickers.

Since leaving Richmond at the end of the 2019 season, Perez has been a stalwart for FC Motown. He helped lead the club to the 2022 NPSL Championship, and a second appearance in the final in 2024.
