= Joe Fala =

American soccer player

Joseph Fala
Personal information
- Date of birth: December 29, 1997 (age 28)
- Place of birth: Cape May Court House, New Jersey, United States
- Height: 2.01 m (6 ft 7 in)
- Positions: Center-back; forward

Team information
- Current team: Jackson Lions FC

College career
Years	Team	Apps	(Gls)
2016–2019	Ramapo Roadrunners	75	(47)

Senior career*
Years	Team	Apps	(Gls)
2019 Clubs = Jackson Lions FC	FC Motown	6	(0)
2020	New York Red Bulls II	14	(1)
2021–	FC Motown		
- * Club domestic league appearances and goals as of March 20, 2025

Joseph Fala (born December 29, 1997) is an American soccer player who plays as a defender for National Premier Soccer League club FC Motown.

== Career ==
=== Youth ===
Raised in the Cape May Court House section of Middle Township, New Jersey, Fala attended Middle Township High School, where he played basketball and tennis, in addition to soccer. He played college soccer from 2016 through 2019 with Ramapo Roadrunners. During his college career Fala played as a striker, appearing in 75 matches and scoring 47 goals and providing 17 assists.

=== Professional ===
On March 5, 2020, Fala was signed by New York Red Bulls II after impressing in a club combine while playing as a defender. He made his professional debut on March 7, starting in a 1–0 loss against Tampa Bay Rowdies.

He was released by Red Bulls II on November 30, 2020.
