= Lansdowne Yonkers FC =

American soccer club

- Full name: Lansdowne Yonkers FC
- Nicknames: LYFC, The Bhoys
- Founded: 1997
- Ground: Tibbetts Brook Park
- Club President: William McGrory
- Head Coach: Matthew Kane
- League: Eastern Premier Soccer League; Cosmopolitan Soccer League
- 1st (EPSL 2020-21 Season)
- Website: lansdowneyonkersfc.com
Home colors

Lansdowne Yonkers FC (formerly Lansdowne Bhoys FC) is an American soccer club based in Yonkers, New York. Founded in 1997, the team plays in Region I of the United States Adult Soccer Association. The club, also known as the "Bhoys", was formed by Irish American immigrants in 1997 and wears the same colours as Celtic FC. While including Irish players on its teams, there is a distinct multinational feel to the club as they have featured players from the US, New Zealand, Ivory Coast, Germany, Jamaica, and Gambia.

The Lansdowne Yonkers FC honorary President is ESPN soccer analyst Tommy Smyth.

== Honors ==
=== League ===
Cosmopolitan Soccer League Division 1 4-time winner (2013–14, 2014–15, 2015–16, 2016–17).

Eastern Premier Soccer League 1-time winner (2020–21).

=== Lamar Hunt US Open Cup ===
The Lamar Hunt US Open Cup is the American version of the FA Cup in England. The U.S. Open Cup includes professional teams from the USASA, NPSL, PDL, USL, as well as NASL and MLS. Similar to the FA Cup in England, amateur teams can qualify their way through their regions to take on the top Professional teams.

In 2016 Lansdowne Yonkers FC made its way to the 3rd Round proper of the 2016 Lamar Hunt US Open Cup, eliminating the Long Island Rough Riders of the Premier Development League and Pittsburgh Riverhounds of United Soccer League.

=== Werner Fricker National Amateur Cup ===
On August 6, 2017, Lansdowne Yonkers FC won the National Amateur Cup. After capturing the USASA Region I title, Lansdowne Yonkers FC traveled to Milwaukee to compete in the National Amateur Cup. Lansdowne defeated LA Wolves FC 1–0 in the semi-final, and then went on to beat Milwaukee Bavarian SC in the final 9–8 in a penalty shoot out. The winning penalty was scored by Momodou Sawaneh. In 2019 they won their second Werner Fricker Amateur Open Cup title over Texas side ASC New Stars in the final, 1–0. The team reached the final by downing Fort Wayne SC of Indiana, 6–0, two days prior. Lansdowne's Werner Fricker Open Cup Opponents:

USASA Region I Opponents: New York Athletic Club (NY) New York Greek Americans (NY) New York Pancyprian Freedom (NY) Kosmo Olimpious (NY) Cedar Stars Academy (NJ) FC Motown (NJ) Brockton United (MA) Yinz United (D.C.)

USASA Champion of Regions: Fort Wayne (ID) ASU New Stars (TX)

== Partnership with Celtic ==
In 2016, Lansdowne Yonkers FC signed an international club partnership with Scottish club Celtic FC.

This partnership allows Lansdowne Yonkers FC:

- To access to academy standard coaching curriculum
- Provide opportunities to visit Celtic FC
- Receive visits from Celtic FC coaches to partner club
- Provide opportunities for players to attend official Celtic FC coaching in Glasgow
- Allow Lansdowne Yonkers FC to host Celtic FC soccer camps/clinics

== Youth system ==
Lansdowne Yonkers FC had an affiliation with Yonkers United and their 25 youth teams. In 2016, Lansdowne sent teams to compete in the international SuperCupNI (formerly called the Northern Ireland Youth Soccer Tournament) in Derry. Previous winners of this tournament include world-famous clubs such as Manchester United, Newcastle United, and FC Barcelona.

Lansdowne's youth system is run by Jim Kelly, the club's Youth Director of Football and an experienced UEFA 'A Licensed' coach, and Michael Holzer, the club's Technical Director and a former New York Cosmos player. LYFC's youth system consists of 20 teams, ranging from ages 8 to 18. The club's youth teams play in the Westchester Youth Soccer League (WYSL), National Premier League (NPL), and the New York Club Soccer League (NYCSL). The club holds various youth events throughout the year, including tournaments, clinics, camps, and travel programs.
