= 2027 U.S. Open Cup qualification =

2027 Lamar Hunt U.S. Open Cup qualification
Tournament details
- Country: United States
- Dates: September 12 – November 22, 2026
- Teams: 155
- Qualified teams: (Ohio) Akron City FC; (Washington (state)) Bellevue Athletic FC; (Massachusetts) CD Faialense; (Illinois) Chicago Nation FC; (Arizona) Next Level Soccer Premier; (New York (state)) NY Renegades FC; (Pennsylvania) Philadelphia Lone Star FC; (Florida) Pinellas County United Pelicans SC; (South Carolina) SCU Heat

Tournament statistics
- Matches played: 123
- Goals scored: 568 (4.62 per match)
- All statistics correct as of 18:55, November 1, 2026 (UTC).

The 2027 Lamar Hunt U.S. Open Cup qualification will serve as local qualification for the 112th edition of the oldest soccer tournament in the United States. The tournament proper will feature both professional and amateur teams in the United States soccer league system.

Qualification for the 2027 tournament will include local qualifying matches contested by a record setting 155 amateur teams competing for 16 local qualifying slots, and will take place in 2026. United Premier Soccer League has the highest representation with 63 teams entering the tournament, while California will have the most teams of any state with 23. Sixteen amateur teams have already qualified for the 2027 U.S. Open Cup.

== Qualification procedure ==
Clubs based in the United States that play in an outdoor soccer league that is an organization member of U.S. Soccer are generally eligible to compete for the U.S. Open Cup, so long as their league includes at least four teams and has a schedule of at least 10 matches for each club. To be eligible, teams must be members in good standing of their leagues on December 31, 2026, and remain so through the 2027 final. Any team that started its first season of competition in an existing league must have started its new league's schedule no later 30 days prior to the Open Division Entry Deadline.

As in prior tournaments, automatic bids in to the first round of the tournament proper are awarded to the winner of the previous year's National Amateur Cup, the United Premier Soccer League Spring Champion, and the John Motta Trophy winner (Open-Division team that performed the best in the previous tournament). Starting in 2027, the runner-up in the United Premier Soccer League, The League for Clubs champion, and the Hank Steinbrecher Cup Champion from the previous year also earn automatic bids for the first round of the U.S. Open Cup. These six teams along with the 16 local qualifiers account for 22 of the 32 amateur teams that qualify for the tournament proper in 2027. The other 10 teams come from the National Premier Soccer League and USL League Two. The champions and two additional teams from the National Premier Soccer League and the champions and six additional teams from USL League Two qualify through national league pathways, which use previous summer season standings to determine teams that qualify.

== Amateur qualification ==
=== National Amateur Cup ===
El Farolito SC defeated Lansdowne Yonkers FC 3–1 in extra time, to win the 2026 National Amateur Cup and qualify for the 2027 U.S. Open Cup.

=== John Motta Trophy winner ===
Asheville City SC advanced the furthest in the 2026 U.S. Open Cup, earning both the $50,000 bonus and the John Motta Trophy. Based on their performance in the previous tournament, Asheville City SC qualifies directly into the 2027 U.S. Open Cup.

=== Hank Steinbrecher Cup winner ===
Vermont Green FC defeated West Chester United SC 4–1 in the final of the Hank Steinbrecher Cup, earning an automatic berth into the 2027 U.S. Open Cup

=== United Premier Soccer League Spring qualifiers ===
Deportivo Rose City defeated Miami United FC 3–1, to win the 2026 UPSL Spring Championships. Both teams earned a direct qualification into the 2027 U.S. Open Cup.

=== The League for Clubs Champions ===
Pensacola FC defeated Iron Rose FC 1–0 in extra time to earn their first league title and an automatic bid into the 2027 U.S. Open Cup.

=== National Premier Soccer League qualifiers ===
With El Farolito SC winning the National Amateur Cup, Bristol Rhythm AFC received an automatic berth to the 2027 U.S. Open Cup as the NPSL runners up for 2026 National Premier Soccer League season. Ambassadors FC Ohio and New Haven United FC also received automatic berths for reaching the semifinals in the 2026 NPSL season.

=== USL League Two qualifiers ===
Ballard FC, Colorado Storm, Laredo Heat, Little Rock Rangers, Minneapolis City SC, Ocean City Nor'easters, and San Francisco City FC all received automatic berths to the 2027 U.S. Open Cup based on league performances in the 2026 USL League Two season

=== Local qualifying ===
U.S. Soccer announced that 155 teams will participate in local qualifying. Four rounds of local qualifying matches will result in 16 clubs advancing to the tournament proper. The teams will be organized into 16 regional pools prior to the qualifying round draw. Teams will play in 2–4 of the qualifying rounds in route to securing one of the 16 advancing slots.

==== Schedule ====
Schedule for 2027 Lamar Hunt U.S. Open Cup Qualifying
Round	Match day	New Teams	Current Teams Remaining	Teams entered to date
First Qualifying Round	September 12 & 13	54	54	54
Second Qualifying Round	October 3 & 4	101	128	155
Third Qualifying Round	October 31 & November 1	0	64	155
Fourth Qualifying Round	November 21 & 22	0	32	155

==== Number of teams by state and league ====
A total of 29 states and the District of Columbia are represented by clubs in the U.S. Open Cup Qualification this year.

	States	Number	League	Teams
1	California (23)	8	United Premier Soccer League	Bay Area United FC, CV United FC, Irvine FC, Laguna United FC, Olympiacos CA, San Diego Internacional FC, Sonoma Valley United, Temecula FC
1	California (23)	4	Southwest Premier League	Chula Vista FC, DC Monsters, JSC Jasa, Legends SC
1	California (23)	4	The League for Clubs	CF San Rafael, Iron Rose FC, Napa Valley 1839 FC, San Ramon FC
1	California (23)	3	San Francisco Soccer Football League	International San Francisco, Norcal Shockwaves FC, San Francisco Vikings Soccer Club
1	California (23)	2	NISA Nation	Capo FC, Problems SC
1	California (23)	1	National Premier Soccer League	Oakland Stompers
1	California (23)	1	USL League Two	Academica SC
2	Florida (20)	15	United Premier Soccer League	Boca Jrs Miami FC, Bold City SC, Cape Coral City FC, FC America CFL Spurs, FC Kanks, Florida Badgers FC, Florida Island United FC, Harbor City FC, Inter City FC, Kissimmee SC, O'Shea's FC, Palm Beach Flames SC, Pinellas County United Pelicans SC, Stetson FA, SWFL SC
2	Florida (20)	2	Premier Futbol League	Dreamers AFC, Red Force FC
2	Florida (20)	1	NPSL-RL	Charlotte County FC
2	Florida (20)	1	Sunshine Conference League	Naples United FC
2	Florida (20)	1	USL League Two	Shark Coast FC
3	Texas (14)	4	The League for Clubs	Capital City SC, Central Texas Coyotes FC, FORO SC, RGV Red Crowns
3	Texas (14)	2	Dallas Soccer Alliance	Master Joga, StrikerZ DFW
3	Texas (14)	2	Houston Football Association	ASC New Stars, Aurora FC
3	Texas (14)	2	Metroplex Premier League	Inter Nova Havoc, Sporting NTX
3	Texas (14)	2	United States Soccer League	Houston Lions FC, Real Houston Futbol Club
3	Texas (14)	1	Austin Men's Soccer Association	ATX United
3	Texas (14)	1	USL League Two	Denton Diablos FC
4	New York (11)	5	United Premier Soccer League	FCY New York, NY Dash FC, NY Renegades FC, Osner's FC, Red Hook Football Club
4	New York (11)	4	American Premier Soccer League	Lansdowne Yonkers FC, New York Athletic Club, New York Greek American SC, New York Pancyprian-Freedoms
4	New York (11)	1	Cosmopolitan Soccer League	New Amsterdam FC
4	New York (11)	1	National Premier Soccer League	American Soccer Club New York
5	New Jersey (10)	4	United Premier Soccer League	Bulldogs SC, Five Rivers SC, Ironbound SCP, New Jersey Alliance FC
5	New Jersey (10)	4	American Premier Soccer League	Jersey Shore Boca, Oaklyn United FC, Real Central New Jersey, SC Vistula Garfield
5	New Jersey (10)	1	National Premier Soccer League	FC Motown
5	New Jersey (10)	1	The League for Clubs	FC Monmouth
6	Georgia (9)	4	United Premier Soccer League	Kalonji Pro-Profile, Lake Country United FC, Potros FC, UFA Lawrenceville
6	Georgia (9)	3	American Premier Soccer League	Peachtree FC, Prima Football Club, Buckhead SC
6	Georgia (9)	1	Atlanta District Amateur Soccer League	Terminus FC
6	Georgia (9)	1	USL League Two	Swarm FC
7	Pennsylvania (8)	5	American Premier Soccer League	Colonial SC, Philadelphia Soccer Club, Vereinigung Erzgebirge, Vidas United FC, WC Predators
7	Pennsylvania (8)	2	United Premier Soccer League	Pennsylvania Prime FC, Philadelphia Lone Star FC
7	Pennsylvania (8)	1	USL League Two	Steel City FC
8	Massachusetts (7)	3	Bay State Soccer League	Atletico Boston, CD Faialense, FC Omens
8	Massachusetts (7)	3	United Premier Soccer League	Brockton FC United, Fall River FC, South Coast Union
8	Massachusetts (7)	1	American Premier Soccer League	Somerville United FC
9	Colorado (6)	4	Colorado Premier League	Azteca FC 5280, Colorado Rovers S.C., FC Denver, Harpos FC
9	Colorado (6)	2	Mountain Premier League	Peak Eleven FC, Timbers SC
9	Virginia (6)	5	United Premier Soccer League	Arlington SA Pro, Doradus FC, Grove United, Los Toros, Virginia Dream FC
9	Virginia (6)	1	American Premier Soccer League	Nova FC
11	Illinois (4)	3	United Premier Soccer League	Chicago Nation FC, Chicago Strikers, Ethos United
11	Illinois (4)	1	Midwest Premier League	Chicago House AC
11	Maryland (4)	2	United Premier Soccer League	Bowleys Athletic, MSI
11	Maryland (4)	1	American Premier Soccer League	Patuxent FA
11	Maryland (4)	1	DC Premier League	Oranje FC
11	Ohio (4)	2	USL League Two	Akron City FC, Lorain County Leviathan FC
11	Ohio (4)	1	North Coast Soccer League	Croatia Cleveland
11	Ohio (4)	1	United Premier Soccer League	Columbus Astray
14	District of Columbia (3)	1	American Premier League	Aegean Hawks FC
14	District of Columbia (3)	1	Super Soccer League	Yinz United
14	District of Columbia (3)	1	United Premier Soccer League	DC Hyper
14	Nevada (3)	2	Southwest Premier League	Be Pro FC, Las Vegas United Football Club
14	Nevada (3)	1	NISA Nation	Sin City Football Club
16	Arizona (2)	1	United Premier Soccer League	Next Level Soccer Premier
16	Arizona (2)	1	USL League Two	Stars FC
16	North Carolina (2)	1	National Premier Soccer League	Mint Hill FC
16	North Carolina (2)	1	United Premier Soccer League	Briar United FC
16	Oklahoma (2)	2	The League for Clubs	Oklahoma United FC, Tulsa Athletic
16	Tennessee (2)	2	United Premier Soccer League	Tennessee Tempo FC, Tennessee United Soccer Club
16	Washington (2)	1	Seattle Recreational Adult Team Soccer	Sharktopus FC
16	Washington (2)	1	United Premier Soccer League	Bellevue Athletic FC
16	Wisconsin (2)	1	Midwest Premier League	Green Bay Glory
16	Wisconsin (2)	1	Milwaukee Premier League	Milwaukee Bavarians
22	Arkansas (1)	1	United Premier Soccer League	Arkansas Wolves 2
22	Connecticut (1)	1	American Premier Soccer League	KO Elites FC
22	Indiana (1)	1	United Premier Soccer League	Southern Indiana Guardians FC
22	Kansas (1)	1	Midwest Premier League	Woodland Football Club
22	Kentucky (1)	1	Ohio Valley Premier League	Mockingbird Valley Premier
22	Michigan (1)	1	United Premier Soccer League	Detroit Metro FC
22	Missouri (1)	1	Midwest Premier League	BOHFS St. Louis
22	Nebraska (1)	1	United Premier Soccer League	Omaha Street FC
22	South Carolina (1)	1	United Premier Soccer League	SCU Heat
22	Utah (1)	1	Southwest Premier League	STG Premier FC
22	West Virginia (1)	1	USL League Two	West Virginia United

== First Qualifying Round ==
The first qualifying round matches were held on September 12 & 13, 2025. 101 clubs got first qualifying round byes.

September 12, 2026	DC Hyper (UPSL) (Washington, D.C.)	3–0	(Maryland) Oranje FC (DCPL)	Largo, Maryland
4:00 pm ET		Report		Stadium: Prince George Community College

September 12, 2026	Naples United FC (SCL) (Florida)	5–1	(Florida) SWFL SC (UPSL)	Naples, Florida
5:00 pm ET		Report		Stadium: Seacrest Country Day School

September 12, 2026	Florida Island United FC (UPSL) (Florida)	2–3	(Florida) Boca Jrs Miami FC (UPSL)	Miami, Florida
5:30 pm ET		Report		Stadium: Oak Grove Park

September 12, 2026	Croatia Cleveland (NCSL) (Ohio)	1–1 (a.e.t.) (3–4 p)	(Pennsylvania) Steel City FC (USL2)	Mentor, Ohio
6:00 pm ET		Report		Stadium: Mentor High School

September 12, 2026	Bowleys Athletic (UPSL) (Maryland)	4–1	(Maryland) MSI (UPSL)	Middle River, Maryland
7:00 pm ET		Report		Stadium: Eastern Regional Park

September 12, 2026	Florida Badgers FC (UPSL)	1–0	(Florida) Red Force FC (PFL)	Pembroke Pines, Florida
7:00 pm ET		Report		Stadium: Broward College

September 12, 2026	Swarm FC (USL2) (Georgia (U.S. state))	5–1	(Georgia (U.S. state)) Prima Football Club (APSL)	Austell, Georgia
7:00 pm ET		Report		Stadium: Marathon Soccer Park

September 12, 2026	Lansdowne Yonkers FC (APSL) (New York (state))	1–0	(New York (state)) New York Athletic Club (APSL)	Yonkers, New York
7:30 pm ET		Report		Stadium: Tibbetts Park

September 12, 2026	Temecula FC (UPSL) (California)	5–1	(California) Problems FC (NISAN)	Temecula, California
5:00 pm PT		Report		Stadium: Chaparral High School

September 12, 2026	Chicago Strikers (UPSL) (Illinois)	1–1 (a.e.t.) (3–4 p)	(Illinois) Ethos United (UPSL)	Aurora, Illinois
7:30 pm CT		Report		Stadium: Marmion Academy

September 12, 2026	STG Premier FC (SWPL) (Utah)	5–0	(Nevada) Be Pro FC (SWPL)	St. George, Utah
7:30 pm MT		Report		Stadium: Snow Canyon High School

September 12, 2026	Sin City Football Club (NISAN) (Nevada)	2–1	(Nevada) Las Vegas United FC (SWPL)	Las Vegas, Nevada
8:00 pm PT		Report		Stadium: Mater Academy East

September 13, 2026	Peachtree FC (APSL) (Georgia (U.S. state))	4–5	(Georgia (U.S. state)) Kalonji Pro-Profile (UPSL)	Kennesaw, Georgia
4:00 pm ET				Stadium: Mount Paran Christian School

September 13, 2026	Southern Indiana Guardians FC (UPSL) (Indiana)	1–3 (a.e.t.)	(Kentucky) Mockingbird Valley Premier (OVPL)	Jeffersonville, Indiana
4:00 pm ET				Stadium: Woehrle Athletic Complex

September 13, 2026	Five Rivers SC (UPSL) (New Jersey)	1–4	(New Jersey) SC Vistula Garfield (APSL)	Carteret, New Jersey
4:30 pm ET				Stadium: Joseph Medwick Park

September 13, 2026	Arlington SA Pro (UPSL) (Virginia)	0–2	Virginia Dream FC (UPSL)	Alexandria, Virginia
5:00 pm ET				Stadium: Thomas Jefferson High School

September 13, 2026	Lorain County Leviathan FC (USL2) (Ohio)	3–4	(Ohio) Akron City FC (USL2)	Avon, Ohio
5:00 pm ET				Stadium: ForeFront Field

September 13, 2026	Doradus FC (UPSL) (Virginia)	2–1 (a.e.t.)	(Virginia) Nova FC (APSL)	West Springfield, Virginia
6:00 pm ET				Stadium: West Springfield High School

September 13, 2026	Tennessee United Soccer Club (UPSL) (Tennessee)	0–6	Tennessee Tempo FC (UPSL)	Hendersonville, Tennessee
6:00 pm CT				Stadium: Drakes Creek Park

September 13, 2026	UFA Lawrenceville (UPSL) (Georgia (U.S. state))	0–6	(Georgia (U.S. state)) Terminus FC (ADASL)	Lawrenceville, Georgia
7:00 pm ET				Stadium: Rhodes Jordan Park

September 13, 2026	Timbers SC (MPL) (Colorado)	0–6	(Colorado) FC Denver (MPL)	Highlands Ranch, Colorado
6:00 pm MT				Stadium: David A. Lorenz Regional Park

September 13, 2026	Osner's FC (UPSL) (New York (state))	3–2	(New York (state)) American Soccer Club New York (NPSL)	Brooklyn, New York
8:00 pm ET				Stadium: Floyd Bennett Sports Complex

September 13, 2026	Yinz United (SSL) (Washington, D.C.)	10–1	(Maryland) Patuxent FA (APSL)	McLean, Virginia
8:00 pm ET				Stadium: Langley High School

September 13, 2026	FC Kanks (UPSL) (Florida)	1–2	(Florida) Shark Coast FC (USL2)	Orlando, Florida
8:15 pm ET				Stadium: XL Lake Nona

September 13, 2026	StrikerZ DFW (DSA) (Texas)	1–4	(Texas) FORO SC (TLC)	McKinney, Texas
8:00 pm CT				Stadium: McKinney Boyd High School

September 13, 2026	Peak Eleven FC (MPL) (Colorado)	4–0	(Colorado) Colorado Rovers S.C. (CPL)	Thornton, Colorado
7:00 pm MT				Stadium: Pinnacle Athletic Complex

September 19, 2026	Buckhead SC (APSL) (Georgia (U.S. state))	1–3	(Georgia (U.S. state)) Potros FC (UPSL)	Decatur, Georgia
10:00 am ET				Stadium: Agnes Scott College

- Byes Academica SC, Aegean Hawks FC, Arkansas Wolves 2, ASC New Stars, Atletico Boston, ATX United, Aurora FC, Azteca FC 5280, Bay Area United FC, Bellevue Athletic FC, BOHFS St. Louis, Bold City SC, Briar United FC, Brockton FC United, Bulldogs SC, Cape Coral City FC, Capital City SC, Capo FC, CD Faialense, Central Texas Coyotes FC, CF San Rafael, Charlotte County FC, Chicago House AC, Chicago Nation FC, Chula Vista FC, Colonial SC, Columbus Astray, CV United FC, DC Monsters, Denton Diablos, Detroit Metro FC, Dreamers AFC, Fall River FC, FC America CFL Spurs, FC Monmouth, FC Motown, FC Omens, FCY New York, Green Bay Glory, Grove United, Harbor City FC, Harpos FC, Houston Lions FC, Inter City FC, Inter Nova Havoc, International San Francisco, Iron Rose FC, Ironbound SCP, Irvine FC, Jersey Shore Boca, JSC Jasa, Kissimmee SC, KO Elites FC, Laguna United FC, Lake Country United FC, Legends SC, Los Toros, Master Joga, Milwaukee Bavarians, Mint Hill FC, Napa Valley 1839 FC. New Amsterdam FC, New Jersey Alliance FC, New York Greek American SC, Next Level Soccer Premier, Norcal Shockwaves, NY Dash FC, NY Pancyprian Freedoms, NY Renegades FC, O’Shea’s FC, Oakland Stompers, Oaklyn United FC, Oklahoma United FC, Olympiacos CA, Omaha Street FC, Palm Beach Flames SC, Pennsylvania Prime FC, Philadelphia Lone Star FC, Philadelphia SC, Pinellas County United Pelicans SC, Real Central NJ Soccer, Real Houston FC, Red Hook FC, RGV Red Crowns, San Diego Internacional FC, San Ramon FC, SCU Heat, SF Vikings SC, Sharktopus FC, Somerville United FC, Sonoma Valley United, South Coast Union, Sporting NTX, Stars FC, Stetson FA, Tulsa Athletic, Vereinigung Erzgebirge, Vidas United FC, WC Predators, West Virginia United, Woodland FC

== Second Qualifying Round ==
The second qualifying round matches took place October 3–4, 2026. Columbus Astray advanced to the Third Qualifying Round after West Virginia United dropped from the competition.

October 3, 2026	Columbus Astray (UPSL) (Ohio)	1–0	(West Virginia) West Virginia United (USL2)
		Report
Note: West Virginia United forfeited when they dropped from the competition

October 3, 2026	Vereinigung Erzgebirge (APSL) (Pennsylvania)	8–1	(Pennsylvania) Philadelphia Soccer Club (APSL)	Warminster Township, Pennsylvania
2:00 pm EDT		Report		Stadium: Vereinigung Erzgebirge Clubhouse

October 3, 2026	Olympiacos CA (UPSL) (California)	3–1	(California) Irvine FC (UPSL)	Huntington Beach, California
2:00 pm PDT		Report		Stadium: Pleasant View Park

October 3, 2026	Naples United FC (SCL) (Florida)	0–1	(Florida) Inter City FC (UPSL)	Naples, Florida
5:00 pm EDT		Report		Stadium: Seacrest Country Day School

October 3, 2026	Steel City FC (USL2) (Pennsylvania)	5–1	(New York (state)) FCY New York (UPSL)	Pittsburgh, Pennsylvania
6:00 pm EDT		Report		Stadium: UPMC Graham Field

October 3, 2026	Colonial SC (APSL) (Pennsylvania)	3–1	(Pennsylvania) Vidas United FC (APSL)	Plymouth Meeting, Pennsylvania
6:00 pm EDT		Report		Stadium: Victory Field

October 3, 2026	New Jersey Alliance FC (UPSL)	2–1	(New Jersey) Ironbound SCP (UPSL)	Clifton, New Jersey
6:30 pm EDT		Report		Stadium: Athenia Steel Park

October 3, 2026	Florida Badgers FC (UPSL)	5–0	(Florida) O’Shea’s FC (UPSL)	Fort Lauderdale, Florida
7:00 pm EDT		Report		Stadium: Broward College

October 3, 2026	Cape Coral City FC (UPSL) (Florida)	0–3	(Florida) Charlotte County FC (NPSL)	Babcock Ranch, Florida
7:00 pm EDT		Report		Stadium: William & Mary Ann Smith Sports Complex

October 3, 2026	CD Faialense (BSSL) (Massachusetts)	3–2 (a.e.t.)	(Massachusetts) Brockton FC United (UPSL)	Malden, Massachusetts
7:00 pm EDT		Report		Stadium: Malden Catholic High School

October 3, 2026	WC Predators (APSL) (Pennsylvania)	3–0	(New Jersey) Oaklyn United FC (APSL)	Scott Auto Field
7:00 pm EDT		Report		Attendance: West Chester, Pennsylvania

October 3, 2026	Bulldogs SC (UPSL) (New Jersey)	7–4	(New Jersey) Jersey Shore Boca (APSL)	Old Bridge Township, New Jersey
7:00 pm EDT		Report		Stadium: Geick Park

October 3, 2026	Grove United (UPSL) (Virginia)	1–2	Virginia Dream FC (UPSL)	Midlothian, Virginia
7:00 pm EDT		Report		Stadium: River City Sportsplex

October 3, 2026	FC America CFL Spurs (UPSL) (Florida)	1–0	(Florida) Stetson FA (UPSL)	Lake Mary, Florida
7:15 pm EDT		Report		Stadium: Lake Mary High School

October 3, 2026	Ethos United (UPSL) (Illinois)	1–2 (a.e.t.)	(Illinois) Chicago House AC (MWPL)	Chicago, Illinois
6:00 pm CDT		Report		Stadium: Lions For Hope Sports Complex

October 3, 2026	Green Bay Glory (MWPL) (Wisconsin)	1–2	(Wisconsin) Milwaukee Bavarians (MPL)	Green Bay, Wisconsin
6:30 pm CDT		Report		Stadium: Aldo Santaga Stadium

October 3, 2026	Sporting NTX (MPL) (Texas)	1–2 (a.e.t.)	(Texas) Denton Diablos FC (USL2)	Dallas, Texas
7:00 pm CDT		Report		Stadium: Paul Quinn College

October 3, 2026	Master Joga (DSA) (Texas)	2–3 (a.e.t.)	Arkansas Wolves 2 (UPSL)	Richardson, Texas
7:00 pm CDT		Report		Stadium: JJ Pearce B Field Stadium

October 3, 2026	Osner's FC (UPSL) (New York (state))	0–2	(New York (state)) NY Renegades FC (UPSL)	Brooklyn, New York
8 pm EDT		Report		Stadium: Floyd Bennett Sports Complex

October 3, 2026	Lansdowne Yonkers FC (APSL) (New York (state))	3–0	(New York (state)) Red Hook Football Club (UPSL)	Yonkers, New York
8:30 pm EDT		Report		Stadium: Tibbetts Park

October 3, 2026	RGV Red Crowns (TLC) (Texas)	3–1	(Texas) Central Texas Coyotes FC (TLC)	Harlingen, Texas
7:30 pm EDT		Report		Stadium: Harlingen Field

October 3, 2026	Oklahoma United FC (TLC)	2–1	(Oklahoma) Tulsa Athletic (TLC)	Edmond, Oklahoma
8:00 pm CDT		Report		Stadium: Chad Richison Stadium

October 3, 2026	Aurora FC (HFA) (Texas)	1–2	(Texas) Houston Lions FC (USSL)	Katy, Texas
8:00 pm CDT		Report		Stadium: Union Park

October 3, 2026	Napa Valley 1839 FC (TLC) (California)	3–0	(California) Bay Area United FC (UPSL)	Napa, California
6:00 pm PDT		Report		Stadium: Justin-Siena High School

October 3, 2026	Norcal Shockwaves (SFSFL) (California)	1–20	(California) JSC Jasa (SWPL)	San Francisco, California
6:15 pm PDT		Report		Stadium: Beach Chalet Athletic Fields

October 3, 2026	San Ramon FC (TLC) (California)	4–2	(California) Academica SC (USL2)	San Ramon, California
6:30 pm PDT		Report		Stadium: Tiffany Roberts Field

October 3, 2026	Laguna United FC (UPSL) (California)	4–1	(California) Temecula FC (NPSL)	Laguna Niguel, California
6:30 pm EDT		Report		Stadium: La Paz Sports Park

October 3, 2026	CV United FC (UPSL) (California)	1–2 (a.e.t.)	(California) SF Vikings SC (SFSFL)	Livermore, California
7:00 pm PDT		Report		Stadium: Robertson Park

October 3, 2026	Oakland Stompers (NPSL) (California)	2–0 (a.e.t.)	(California) Sonoma Valley United (UPSL)	Antioch, California
7:00 pm PDT		Report		Stadium: Antioch High School

October 3, 2026	Sin City Football Club (NISAN) (Nevada)	3–1	(Utah) STG Premier FC (SWPL)	Las Vegas, Nevada
7:00 pm PDT		Report		Stadium: Mater Academy East

October 3, 2026	International San Francisco (SFSFL) (California)	0–1	(California) CF San Rafael (TLC)	San Francisco, California
7:30 pm EDT		Report		Stadium: Crocker Amazon Soccer Fields

October 3, 2026	San Diego Internacional FC (UPSL) (California)	3–0	(California) Chula Vista FC (SWPL)	San Diego, California
8:00 pm PDT		Report		Stadium: Mission Bay High School

October 3, 2026	Capo FC (NISAN) (California)	0–2	(California) DC Monsters (SWPL)	San Clemente, California
7:45 pm PDT		Report		Stadium: Vista Hermosa Sports Park

October 4, 2026	Mockingbird Valley Premier (OVPL) (Kentucky)	0–4	Tennessee Tempo FC (UPSL)	Louisville, Kentucky
1:00 pm EDT		Report		Stadium: Mercy Academy

October 4, 2026	New Amsterdam FC (CSL) (New York (state))	0–14	(New York (state)) New York Greek American SC (APSL)	New York, New York
1:00 pm EDT		Report		Stadium: Randalls and Wards Islands

October 4, 2026	South Coast Union (UPSL) (Massachusetts)	2–8	(Massachusetts) Fall River FC (UPSL)	New Bedford, Massachusetts
1:00 pm EDT		Report		Stadium: Greater New Bedford Regional Vocational-Technical High School

October 4, 2026	FC Omens (BSSL) (Massachusetts)	3–1	(Massachusetts) Atletico Boston (BSSL)	Boston, Massachusetts
1:00 pm EDT		Report		Stadium: West Roxbury High School

October 4, 2026	Somerville United FC (APSL) (Massachusetts)	0–1	(Connecticut) KO Elites FC (APSL)	Somerville, Massachusetts
1:00 pm EDT		Report		Stadium: Dilboy Stadium

October 4, 2026	Los Toros (UPSL) (Virginia)	2–5	(Maryland) Bowleys Athletic (UPSL)	Reston, Virginia
3:00 pm EDT		Report		Stadium: South Lakes High School

October 4, 2026	Philadelphia Lone Star FC (UPSL) (Pennsylvania)	1–0	(Pennsylvania) Pennsylvania Prime FC (UPSL)	Philadelphia, Pennsylvania
3:30 pm EDT		Report		Stadium: John Bartram High School Stadium
Note: forfeit

October 4, 2026	Harpos FC (CPL) (Colorado)	4–3 (a.e.t.)	(Colorado) Azteca FC 5280 (CPL)	Broomfield, Colorado
2:00 pm MDT		Report		Stadium: Broomfield Commons

October 4, 2026	BOHFS St. Louis (MWPL) (Missouri)	2–5	(Illinois) Chicago Nation FC (NPSL)	St. Charles, Missouri
4:30 pm CDT		Report		Stadium: Sport 360

October 4, 2026	Shark Coast FC (USL2) (Florida)	5–0	(Florida) Bold City SC (UPSL)	New Smyrna Beach, Florida
5:30 pm EDT		Report		Stadium: New Smyrna Beach Sports Complex

October 4, 2026	Mint Hill FC (NPSL) (North Carolina)	4–1	(North Carolina) Briar United FC (UPSL)	Charlotte, North Carolina
5:30 pm EDT		Report		Stadium: Queens University Sports Complex

October 4, 2026	Detroit Metro FC (UPSL) (Michigan)	3–4	(Ohio) Akron City FC (USL2)	Brighton, Michigan
6:00 pm EDT		Report		Stadium: Legacy Center

October 4, 2026	SCU Heat (UPSL) (South Carolina)	4–1	(Georgia (U.S. state)) Kalonji Pro-Profile (UPSL)	Columbia, South Carolina
6:00 pm EDT		Report		Stadium: Southeastern Freight Lines Stadium

October 4, 2026	Real Houston Futbol Club (USSL) (Texas)	0–5	(Texas) ASC New Stars (HFA)	Houston, Texas
6:00 pm CDT		Report		Stadium: Azteca Soccer League Park

October 4, 2026	FC Denver (CPL) (Colorado)	5–1	(Colorado) Peak XI FC (MPL)	Denver, Colorado
4:00 pm MDT		Report		Stadium: Northfield High School

October 4, 2026	FORO SC (TLC (Texas)	3–1	(Texas) Inter Nova Havoc (MPL)	Irving, Texas
5:00 pm CDT		Report		Stadium: The Highlands School

October 4, 2026	Yinz United (SSL) (Washington, D.C.)	5–0	(Virginia) Doradus FC (UPSL)	Vienna, Virginia
7:00 pm EDT		Report		Stadium: Oakton High School

October 4, 2026	Real Central New Jersey (APSL) (New Jersey)	2–3	(New Jersey) FC Monmouth (TLC)	West Windsor, New Jersey
7:00 pm EDT		Report		Stadium: Mercer County Community College

October 4, 2026	SC Vistula Garfield (APSL) (New Jersey)	5–3 (a.e.t.)	(New Jersey) FC Motown (NPSL)	Garfield, New Jersey
7:00 pm EDT	Elezaj 27', 87'; Karcz 90'; McGeechan 105'; Woftowicz 120'	Report	Vitella 5'; Catizone 20'; Crognale 88'	Stadium: Garfield High School; Attendance: 73

October 4, 2026	New York Pancyprian-Freedoms (APSL) (New York (state))	1–0	(New York (state)) NY Dash FC (UPSL)	Queens, New York
7:00 pm EDT		Report		Stadium: Belson Stadium

October 4, 2026	Pinellas County United Pelicans SC (UPSL) (Florida)	4–3 (a.e.t.)	(Florida) Kissimmee SC (UPSL)	St. Petersburg, Florida
7:00 pm EDT		Report		Stadium: Walter Fuller Soccer Complex

October 4, 2026	Potros FC (UPSL) (Georgia (U.S. state))	5–0	(Georgia (U.S. state)) Terminus FC (ADASL)	Marietta, Georgia
7:00 pm EDT		Report		Stadium: Marietta High School (Georgia)

October 4, 2026	Swarm FC (USL2) (Georgia (U.S. state))	8–1	(Georgia (U.S. state)) Lake Country United FC (UPSL)	Austell, Georgia
7:30 pm EDT		Report		Stadium: Marathon Soccer Park

October 4, 2026	ATX United (AMSA) (Texas)	1–0	(Texas) Capital City SC (TLC)	Round Rock, Texas
7:30 pm EDT		Report		Stadium: Round Rock Multipurpose Complex

October 4, 2026	Palm Beach Flames SC (UPSL) (Florida)	0–4	(Florida) Harbor City FC (UPSL)	Lake Worth Beach, Florida
7:45 pm EDT		Report		Stadium: Dr. Joaquin Garcia High School

October 4, 2026	Dreamers AFC (PFL) (Florida)	1–0	(Florida) Boca Jrs Miami FC (UPSL)	Miami, Florida
8:00 pm EDT		Report		Stadium: Miami Dade College

October 4, 2026	Aegean Hawks FC (APL) (Washington, D.C.)	0–3	(Washington, D.C.) DC Hyper (UPSL)	McLean, Virginia
8:00 pm EDT		Report		Stadium: Langley High School

October 4, 2026	Woodland Football Club (MWPL) (Kansas)	1–2	(Nebraska) Omaha Street FC (UPSL)	Shawnee, Kansas
7:00 pm CDT		Report		Stadium: St. Joseph Athletic Field

October 4, 2026	Bellevue Athletic FC (UPSL) (Washington (state))	4–0	(Washington (state)) Sharktopus FC (SRATS)	Bellevue, Washington
6:00 pm PDT		Report		Stadium: Bellevue College Soccer Field

October 4, 2026	Legends SC (SWPL) (California)	0–8	(California) Iron Rose FC (TLC)	Elk Grove, California
6:30 pm PDT		Report		Stadium: Bartholomew Sports Complex

October 4, 2026	Stars FC (USL2) (Arizona)	0–4	(Arizona) Next Level Soccer Premier (UPSL)	Surprise, Arizona
7:00 pm MDT		Report		Stadium: Spirit Field Ottawa University

== Third Qualifying Round ==
The third qualifying round matches took place October 31–November 1, 2026.

October 31, 2026	Fall River FC (UPSL) (Massachusetts)	5–1	(Connecticut) KO Elites FC (APSL)	Fall River, Massachusetts
3:30 pm EDT		Report		Stadium: Britland Park

October 31, 2026	Denton Diablos FC (USL2) (Texas)	1–2	(Texas) FORO SC (TLC)	Denton, Texas
4:00 pm CDT		Report		Stadium: Mean Green Soccer Stadium

October 31, 2026	SCU Heat (UPSL) (South Carolina)	8–2	(North Carolina) Mint Hill FC (NPSL)	Columbia, South Carolina
6:00 pm EDT		Report		Stadium: Southeastern Freight Lines Stadium

October 31, 2026	(Florida) Inter City FC (UPSL)	1–0	(Florida) Charlotte County FC (NPSL)
		Report
Note: Charlotte County FC forfeited when they dropped from the competition

October 31, 2026	Houston Lions FC (USSL) (Texas)	2–4	(Texas) ASC New Stars (HFA)	Houston, Texas
6:00 pm CDT		Report		Stadium: Matias Almeyda Stadium Center

October 31, 2026	Lansdowne Yonkers FC (APSL) (New York (state))	6–1	(New York (state)) New York Greek American SC (APSL)	Yonkers, New York
7:30 pm EDT		Report		Stadium: Tibbetts Park

October 31, 2026	NY Renegades FC (UPSL) (New York (state))	2–0	(New York (state)) New York Pancyprian-Freedoms (APSL)	Central Islip, New York
7:45 pm EDT		Report		Stadium: SUSA Orlin & Cohen Sports Complex

October 31, 2026	Laguna United FC (UPSL) (California)	2–5	(California) San Diego Internacional FC (UPSL)	Laguna Niguel, California
6:00 pm PDT		Report		Stadium: La Paz Sports Park

November 1, 2026	Philadelphia Lone Star FC (UPSL) (Pennsylvania)	4–4 (a.e.t.) (4–3 SO)	(Pennsylvania) WC Predators (APSL)	Philadelphia, Pennsylvania
1:30 pm EDT		Report		Stadium: John Bartram High School Stadium

November 1, 2026	FC Omens (BSSL) (Massachusetts)	1–2	(Massachusetts) CD Faialense (BSSL)	Boston, Massachusetts
1:30 pm EDT		Report		Stadium: West Roxbury High School

November 1, 2026	Vereinigung Erzgebirge (APSL) (Pennsylvania)	3–0	(Pennsylvania) Colonial SC (APSL)	Warminster Township, Pennsylvania
2:00 pm EDT		Report		Stadium: Vereinigung Erzgebirge Clubhouse

November 1, 2026	Tennessee Tempo FC (UPSL)	1–0	(Ohio) Columbus Astray (UPSL)	Murfreesboro, Tennessee
2:00 pm CDT		Report		Stadium: Richard Siegel Soccer Complex
Note: Columbus Astray forfeit the match

November 1, 2026	Shark Coast FC (USL2) (Florida)	0–1	(Florida) Harbor City FC (UPSL)	New Smyrna Beach, Florida
4:00 pm EDT		Report		Stadium: New Smyrna Beach Sports Complex

November 1, 2026	RGV Red Crowns (TLC) (Texas)	2–2 (a.e.t.) (7–6 SO)	(Texas) ATX United (AMSA)	Harlingen, Texas
4:00 pm CDT		Report		Stadium: Harlingen Field

November 1, 2026	Omaha Street FC (UPSL) (Nebraska)	4–4 (a.e.t.) (4–2 SO)	(Wisconsin) Milwaukee Bavarians (MPL)	La Vista, Nebraska
4:00 pm CDT		Report		Stadium: CHI Multisport Complex

November 1, 2026	Sin City Football Club (NISAN) (Nevada)	3–4	(Arizona) Next Level Soccer Premier (UPSL)	Las Vegas, Nevada
2:00 pm PDT		Report		Stadium: Mater Academy East

November 1, 2026	Steel City FC (USL2) (Pennsylvania)	1–3	(Ohio) Akron City FC (USL2)	Pittsburgh, Pennsylvania
6:00 pm EDT		Report		Stadium: UPMC Graham Field

November 1, 2026	Iron Rose FC (TLC) (California)	0–2	(Washington (state)) Bellevue Athletic FC (UPSL)	Roseville, California
3:00 pm PDT		Report		Stadium: Placer Valley Soccer Complex

November 1, 2026	New Jersey Alliance FC (UPSL) (New Jersey)	1–2	(New Jersey) SC Vistula Garfield (APSL)	Clifton, New Jersey
6:30 pm EDT		Report		Stadium: Athenia Steel Park

November 1, 2026	Arkansas Wolves 2 (UPSL) (Arkansas)	3–4	Oklahoma United FC (TLC)	North Little Rock, Arkansas
6:00 pm CDT		Report		Stadium: North Little Rock High School

November 1, 2026	FC Denver (CPL) (Colorado)	1–2	(Colorado) Harpos FC (CPL)	Golden, Colorado
5:00 pm MDT		Report		Stadium: Victoria Sports Park & Event Center

November 1, 2026	Pinellas County United Pelicans SC (UPSL) (Florida)	1–0	(Florida) FC America CFL Spurs (UPSL)	St. Leo, Florida
7:00 pm EDT		Report		Stadium: St. Leo University

November 1, 2026	Yinz United (SSL) (Washington, D.C.)	2–0	(Maryland) Bowleys Athletic (UPSL)	Vienna, Virginia
7:00 pm EDT		Report		Stadium: Oakton High School

November 1, 2026	Virginia Dream FC (UPSL) (Virginia)	1–2	(Washington, D.C.) DC Hyper (UPSL)	Falls Church, Virginia
7:30 pm EDT		Report		Stadium: Meridian High School

November 1, 2026	Bulldogs SC (UPSL) (New Jersey)	5–4	(New Jersey) FC Monmouth (TLC)	Old Bridge Township, New Jersey
7:30 pm EDT		Report		Stadium: Geick Park

November 1, 2026	Swarm FC (USL2) (Georgia (U.S. state))	3–1	(Georgia (U.S. state)) Potros FC (UPSL)	Austell, Georgia
7:30 pm EDT		Report		Stadium: Marathon Soccer Park

November 1, 2026	Chicago Nation FC (NPSL) (Illinois)	3–0	(Illinois) Chicago House AC (MWPL)	Glen Ellyn, Illinois
7:00 pm CDT		Report		Stadium: College of DuPage Stadium

November 1, 2026	Dreamers AFC (PFL) (Florida)	4–5 (a.e.t.)	Florida Badgers FC (UPSL)	Miami, Florida
8:00 pm EDT		Report		Stadium: Miami Dade College

November 1, 2026	CF San Rafael (TLC) (California)	2–4	(California) Napa Valley 1839 FC (TLC)	San Francisco, California
5:15 pm PDT		Report		Stadium: Beach Chalet Athletic Fields

November 1, 2026	San Ramon FC (TLC) (California)	6–0	(California) Oakland Stompers (NPSL)	San Ramon, California
6:00 pm PDT		Report		Stadium: Tiffany Roberts Field

November 1, 2026	DC Monsters (SWPL) (California)	3–0	(California) Olympiacos CA (UPSL)	Irvine, California
6:20 pm PDT		Report		Stadium: Great Park

November 1, 2026	JSC Jasa (SWPL) (California)	2–1	(California) SF Vikings SC (SFSFL)	Redwood City, California
7:00 pm PDT		Report		Stadium: Red Morton Park

== Final Qualifying Round ==
The thirty-two third round winners will play in the fourth and final qualifying round November 21–22. The winner of each of the 16 ties will officially qualify for the 2027 U.S. Open Cup.

November 21, 2026	Philadelphia Lone Star FC (UPSL) (Pennsylvania)	3–3 (a.e.t.) (5–4 SO)	(Pennsylvania) Vereinigung Erzgebirge (APSL)	Philadelphia, Pennsylvania
1:30 pm EDT				Stadium: John Bartram High School Stadium

November 21, 2026	Inter City FC (UPSL) (Florida)	0–2	(Florida) Pinellas County United Pelicans SC (UPSL)	Babcock Ranch, Florida
3:00 pm EDT				Stadium: William & Mary Ann Smith Sports Complex

November 21, 2026	Akron City FC (USL2) (Ohio)	5–1	(Tennessee) Tennessee Tempo FC (UPSL)	North Canton, Ohio
6:30 pm EDT				Stadium: Larry Staudt Field

November 21, 2026	Lansdowne Yonkers FC (APSL) (New York (state))	1–3	(New York (state)) NY Renegades FC (UPSL)	Yonkers, New York
7:00 pm EDT				Stadium: Tibbetts Park

November 21, 2026	CD Faialense (BSSL) (Massachusetts)	1–0	(Massachusetts) Fall River FC (UPSL)	Winthrop, Massachusetts
7:00 pm EDT				Stadium: Winthrop High School

November 21, 2026	SCU Heat (UPSL) (South Carolina)	2–1	(Georgia (U.S. state)) Swarm FC (USL2)	Columbia, South Carolina
7:00 pm EDT				Stadium: Southeastern Freight Lines Stadium

November 21, 2026	Next Level Soccer Premier (UPSL) (Arizona)	2–0	(Colorado) Harpos FC (CPL)	Gilbert, Arizona
7:00 pm MDT				Stadium: Higley High School

November 21, 2026	San Ramon FC (TLC) (California)	0–1	(Washington (state)) Bellevue Athletic FC (UPSL)	San Ramon, California
6:00 pm PDT				Stadium: Tiffany Roberts Field

November 22, 2026	Omaha Street FC (UPSL) (Nebraska)	0–2	(Illinois) Chicago Nation FC (NPSL)	Bellevue, Nebraska
3:00 pm CDT				Stadium: Bellevue University

November 22, 2026	SC Vistula Garfield (APSL) (New Jersey)	v	(New Jersey) Bulldogs SC (UPSL)	Garfield, New Jersey
5:00 pm EDT				Stadium: Garfield High School

November 22, 2026	Yinz United (SSL) (Washington, D.C.)	v	(Washington, D.C.) DC Hyper (UPSL)	Vienna, Virginia
7:00 pm EDT				Stadium: Oakton High School

November 22, 2026	ASC New Stars (HFA) (Texas)	v	(Texas) RGV Red Crowns (TLC)	Houston, Texas
7:00 pm CDT				Stadium: Houston Sports Park

November 22, 2026	Oklahoma United FC (TLC)	v	(Texas) FORO SC (TLC)	Edmond, Oklahoma
7:00 pm CDT				Stadium: Tom Thompson Field

November 22, 2026	San Diego Internacional FC (UPSL) (California)	v	(California) DC Monsters (SWPL)	San Diego, California
6:30 pm PDT				Stadium: Mission Bay High School

November 22, 2026	JSC Jasa (SWPL) (California)	v	(California) Napa Valley 1839 FC (TLC)	Redwood City, California
7:00 pm PDT				Stadium: Red Morton Park

November 28, 2026	Harbor City FC (UPSL) (Florida)	v	Florida Badgers FC (UPSL)	Melbourne, Florida
6:30 pm EDT				Stadium: Palm Bay High School
