= Crognale =

Crognale is a surname. Notable people with the surname include:

- Alex Crognale (born 1994), American soccer player
- Eli Crognale (born 1997), American soccer player
- Giuliano Crognale (1770–1862), Italian poet and painter
- Sabrina Crognale (born 1985), Italian modern pentathlete
