= Eli Crognale =

American soccer player (born 1997)

Eli Jude Crognale
Personal information
- Date of birth: December 15, 1997 (age 28)
- Place of birth: Columbus, Ohio, United States
- Height: 6 ft 0 in (1.83 m)
- Position: Midfielder

Team information
- Current team: FC Motown
- Number: 15

Youth career
- 2015–2016: Columbus Crew

College career
Years	Team	Apps	(Gls)
2016	Belmont Bruins	17	(1)
2017–2019	Maryland Terrapins	50	(5)

Senior career*
Years	Team	Apps	(Gls)
2018	Orange County SC U23	10	(1)
2020–2022	Birmingham Legion	44	(2)
2025–	FC Motown		
- * Club domestic league appearances and goals as of March 20, 2025

Eli Jude Crognale (born December 15, 1997) is an American retired professional soccer player. He currently plays for FC Motown.

== Career ==
=== Youth and college ===
Crognale played with the Columbus Crew SC academy, before playing college soccer at Belmont University in 2016. In 2017, Crognale transferred to the University of Maryland, College Park, where he made 50 appearances for the Terrapins, scoring 5 goals and tallying 9 assists.

While in college, Crognale played with USL PDL side Orange County SC U23 during their 2018 season.

=== Professional ===
On May 7, 2020, Crognale signed his first professional contract with USL Championship side Birmingham Legion. He made his debut on July 15, 2020, appearing as a 58th-minute substitute in a 3–0 win over Memphis 901. On March 22, 2022, Crognale announced his decision to retire from playing professional soccer.

Crognale joined FC Motown in 2025 for the club's appearance in the 2025 U.S. Open Cup. He also appeared in the team's 2027 U.S. Open Cup Second Qualifying Round match in October 2026, scoring a goal in a losing effort to SC Vistula Garfield.

== Personal ==
Eli is the brother of professional soccer player Alex Crognale, who also plays for Birmingham Legion.
