= Raffaele Ciappa =

Italian painter

Raffaele Ciappa (born Fanno 1760 - died after 1820s) was an Italian painter, active in a Neoclassical style. He was active mostly as a copyist and restorer.

== Biography ==
He was active in Naples. Along with Andrea Celestino, he help restore and design protections for antique Roman fresco paintings at Pompei. In Naples, among his pupils were Giuliano Crognale and Raffaele Carelli.
