= Bocconotto =

Type of Italian pastry

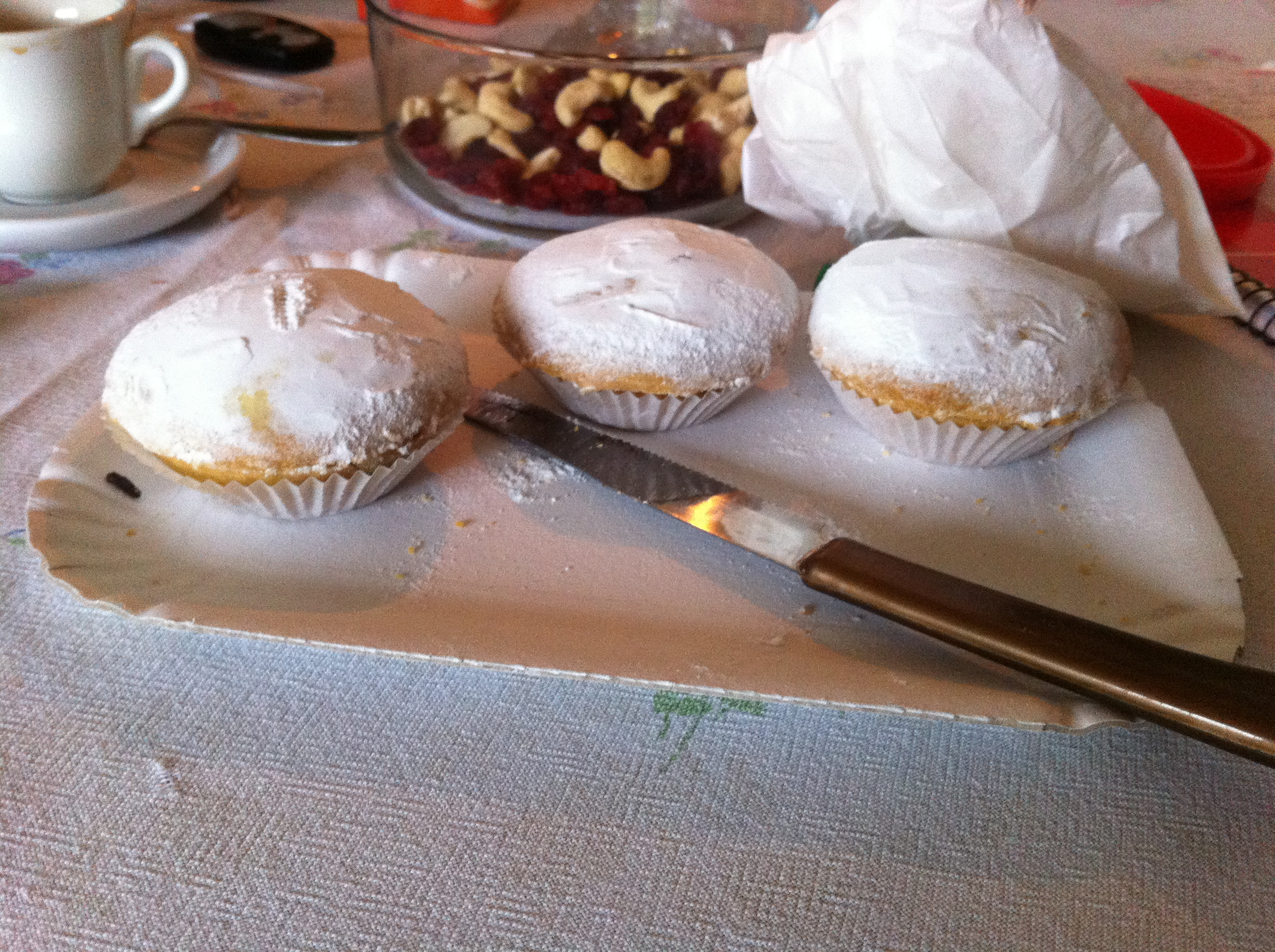
- Bocconotti from Castel Frentano, province of Chieti, Abruzzo
- Type: Pastry
- Place of origin: Italy
- Region or state: Abruzzo; Apulia; Calabria

Bocconotto is a pastry typical of the Italian regions of Abruzzo, Apulia and Calabria. It is often eaten at Christmas.

Its filling varies depending on the region in which it is produced. In Abruzzo, this filling may contain cocoa powder, cinnamon and toasted almonds.

== See also ==
- List of Italian desserts and pastries
