= Andrea Celestini =

Italian painter (1773–1830)

- Born: 1773; Naples, Italy
- Died: c. 1830s (aged 56–66)
- Other names: Celestino, Andrea
- Occupation: Italian painter

Andrea Celestini or Celestino (1773 – 1830s) was an Italian painter, active in a Neoclassical style.

== Biography ==
He was born in Naples. Details of his training and specific works are scant. In 1819, along with the fellow painters Paolo Girgenti and Costanzo Angelini, he was commissioned to create an inventory of the paintings at the Royal Art Gallery (Pinacoteca) in Naples, which would form the core of the collections of the Capodimonte Museum. By 1822 he was an associate member, along with Constanzo Angelini, Antonio Nicolini, and others, of the Royal Bourbon Society (Società Reale Borbonica) of the Fine Arts. In 1823 he successfully competed for the post of professor of painting in the Royal Academy of Design.

Among his works are Christ among the Doctors, Christ of the Charity, Christ of the Innocence. He is described as having a style recalling Titian.

Along with Raffaele Ciappa, Celestino was commissioned by the Bourbon authorities to help develop a method to restore and protect wall frescoes at Pompei.
