= 2026 U.S. Open Cup =

111th edition of cup competition in American soccer

2026 Lamar Hunt U.S. Open Cup
Tournament details
- Country: United States
- Dates: March 17 – October 21
- Teams: 80

Final positions
- Champions: St. Louis City SC (1st title)
- Runners-up: Columbus Crew

Tournament statistics
- Matches played: 79
- Goals scored: 246 (3.11 per match)
- Top goal scorer(s): Hugo Picard; Tola Showunmi (4 goals each)

The 2026 Lamar Hunt U.S. Open Cup was the 111th edition of the U.S. Open Cup, the knockout domestic cup competition of American soccer, organized by the United States Soccer Federation. It involved 80 teams, including 48 from all three professional tiers of the United States soccer league system, and 32 in the "Open Division". The competition began on March 17 and culminated in the final on October 21.

The full format was announced on January 27, 2025. U.S. Soccer changed several elements of the contest, altering the qualifying requirements to ensure the highest-level professional team enters the tournament, as well as removing the National League qualifying track. Participation was limited to teams that played a league season in 2025. It was reduced in size due to World Cup being partially hosted in the United States during the summer, with only 16 teams from each division plus 32 open division teams eligible to participate, effectively eliminating a round. Prize money included $600,000 for winning the competition, $250,000 for the runner-up, and $50,000 bonus for lower-ranked teams advancing the furthest in the competition from their respective divisions.

From Major League Soccer in Division 1, only teams that did not qualify for either the 2026 CONCACAF Champions Cup or 2026 Leagues Cup were eligible to take part. All eligible MLS teams entered in the round of 32 (third round). Based on Supporter's Shield standings, one half of the MLS entrants hosted their first matches, while the rest began with an away game. For Division 2, the USL Championship sent 17 of its teams, being granted an additional spot due to there only being 15 eligible division 3 teams. This included all teams entered in the 2025 USL Championship Playoffs plus the next team outside of playoff consideration. From Division 3, USL League One sent their 13 eligible teams, while only the two independent MLS Next Pro teams were eligible to appear in the competition (Carolina Core FC and Chattanooga FC). Championship, League One, and Next Pro, along with the 32 Open Division teams, entered in the first round.

Defending champions Nashville SC did not participate in the tournament due to the club's participation in the 2026 CONCACAF Champions Cup.

== Schedule ==
Schedule for 2026 Lamar Hunt U.S. Open Cup
Round	Draw date	Match day	Entrants	Teams entered to date
First Round	January 27	March 17–19	6 local qualifiers 1 National Amateur Cup champion 1 UPSL Spring Champion; 1 2025 John Motta Trophy winner 8 United Premier Soccer League teams 5 National Premier Soccer League teams 10 USL League Two teams 13 USL League One teams 2 MLS Next Pro teams 17 USL Championship teams	64 teams
Second Round	March 20	March 31 – April 1	32 winners from First Round	64 teams
Round of 32	April 2	April 14–15	16 winners from Second Round; 16 Major League Soccer teams	80 teams
Round of 16	April 2	April 28–29	16 winners from round of 32	80 teams
Quarterfinals	April 30	May 19–20	8 winners from round of 16	80 teams
Semifinals	April 30	September 16	4 winners from quarterfinals	80 teams
Final	April 30	October 21	2 winners from semifinals	80 teams

== Teams ==
=== Table ===
Enter in First Round				Enter in Round of 32
Open Division		Division III	Division II	Division I
USASA/USSSA; 17 teams	NPSL/USL2; 15 teams	MLS Next Pro/USL1; 15 teams	USL Championship; 17 teams	MLS; 16 teams
National Amateur Cup: West Chester United SC (USLP); UPSL Spring Champions: Tennessee Tempo FC; Local Qualifiers: ASC New Stars (HFA); Azteca FC (CPL); Badgers FC (UPSL); BOHFS St. Louis (MPL); CD Faialense (BSSL); FC America CFL Spurs (UPSL); Kalonji Pro-Profile (UPSL); Laguna United FC (UPSL); NY Renegades FC (UPSL); Red Force (PFL); San Ramon FC (LFC); SC Vistula Garfield (APSL); Southern Indiana FC (UPSL); Valley 559 FC (UPSL); Virginia Dream FC (UPSL)	John Motta Trophy Winner: El Farolito; NPSL: Flower City Union; ~~Hickory FC~~ (Note: Due to Hickory FC leaving the NPSL for USL2, Cruizers FC took their place.); Cruizers FC; Michigan Rangers; Ristozi FC; USL2: Asheville City SC (Note: Winner of $50,000 bonus for advancing the furthest in the competition from their respective divisions.); Des Moines Menace; FC Motown; Flint City Bucks; Laredo Heat SC; Little Rock Rangers; North Virginia FC; Steel City FC; Ventura County Fusion; Vermont Green FC	MLS Next Pro: Carolina Core FC; Chattanooga FC; USL1: AV Alta FC; Charlotte Independence; Chattanooga Red Wolves SC; FC Naples; Forward Madison FC; Greenville Triumph SC; One Knoxville SC; Portland Hearts of Pine; Richmond Kickers; ~~South Georgia Tormenta FC~~ (Note: On February 23, it was announced that South Georgia Tormenta FC would not participate in the 2026 USL League One season, including the U.S. Open Cup.); Spokane Velocity FC; Union Omaha; Westchester SC	Charleston Battery; Detroit City FC; Hartford Athletic; Indy Eleven; Loudoun United FC; Louisville City FC; Pittsburgh Riverhounds SC; Rhode Island FC; Colorado Springs Switchbacks FC; El Paso Locomotive FC; FC Tulsa; Lexington SC; New Mexico United; Orange County SC; Phoenix Rising FC; Sacramento Republic FC; San Antonio FC	Atlanta United FC; Austin FC; Charlotte FC; Chicago Fire FC; Colorado Rapids; Columbus Crew; D.C. United; Houston Dynamo FC; Minnesota United FC; New England Revolution; New York City FC; New York Red Bulls; Orlando City SC; San Jose Earthquakes; St. Louis City SC; Sporting Kansas City

=== Map ===
Locations of teams in the tournament proper.
- MLS
- USLC
- Division 3 (MLSNP/USL1)
- Open Division (USL2/NPSL)
- Open Division (USASA/USSSA)
- Multiple Teams

Metro areas with multiple teams:

- Atlanta: Atlanta United FC (MLS), Kalonji Pro-Profile (UPSL)
- Boston: New England Revolution (MLS), CD Faialense (BSSL)
- Chattanooga: Chattanooga FC (MLSNP), Chattanooga Red Wolves SC (USL1)
- Charlotte: Charlotte FC (MLS), Charlotte Independence (USL1), ~~Hickory FC (NPSL)~~
- Denver: Azteca FC (CPL), Colorado Rapids (MLS)
- Houston: Houston Dynamo (MLS), ASC New Stars (HFA)
- Los Angeles: Orange County SC (USLC), Laguna United FC (UPSL), Ventura County Fusion (USL2)
- Louisville: Louisville City FC (USLC), Southern Indiana FC (UPSL)
- New York City: New York City FC (MLS), New York Red Bulls (MLS), Westchester SC (USL1), FC Motown (NPSL), SC Vistula Garfield (APSL), NY Renegades FC (UPSL)
- Orlando: Orlando City SC (MLS), FC America CFL Spurs (UPSL)
- Pittsburgh: Pittsburgh Riverhounds SC (USLC), Steel City FC (USL2)
- San Francisco Bay Area: San Jose Earthquakes (MLS), El Farolito SC (NPSL), San Ramon FC (TLFC)
- St. Louis: St. Louis City SC (MLS), BOHFS St. Louis (MPL)
- Washington D.C.: D.C. United (MLS), Loudoun United FC (USLC), Virginia Dream FC (UPSL), Northern Virginia FC (USL2)

=== Number of teams by state ===
A total of 34 states and D.C. were represented by clubs in the U.S. Open Cup this year.

States	Number	Teams
California	10	AV Alta FC, Cruizers FC, El Farolito SC, Laguna United FC, Orange County SC, Sacramento Republic FC, San Jose Earthquakes, San Ramon FC, Ventura County Fusion, Valley 559 FC
Texas	6	ASC New Stars, Austin FC, El Paso Locomotive FC, Houston Dynamo FC, Laredo Heat SC, San Antonio FC
Florida	5	Orlando City SC, FC Naples, Badgers FC, Red Force, FC America CFL Spurs
North Carolina	4	Asheville City SC, Carolina Core FC, Charlotte FC, Charlotte Independence, ~~Hickory FC~~
New York	4	New York City FC, Westchester SC, NY Renegades FC, Flower City Union
Tennessee	4	One Knoxville SC, Tennessee Tempo FC, Chattanooga FC, Chattanooga Red Wolves SC
Virginia	4	Loudoun United FC, Virginia Dream FC, Northern Virginia FC, Richmond Kickers
Colorado	3	Colorado Rapids, Colorado Springs Switchbacks, Azteca FC
Georgia	3	Atlanta United FC, ~~South Georgia Tormenta FC~~, Kalonji Pro-Profile
Kentucky	3	Louisville City FC, Lexington SC, Southern Indiana FC
Michigan	3	Detroit City FC, Flint City Bucks, Michigan Rangers
New Jersey	3	New York Red Bulls, FC Motown, SC Vistula Garfield
Pennsylvania	3	Pittsburgh Riverhounds SC, Steel City FC, West Chester United SC
Indiana	2	Indy Eleven, Southern Indiana FC
Massachusetts	2	New England Revolution, CD Faialense
Missouri	2	St. Louis City SC, BOHFS St. Louis
South Carolina	2	Charleston Battery, Greenville Triumph SC
Arizona	1	Phoenix Rising FC
Arkansas	1	Little Rock Rangers
Connecticut	1	Hartford Athletic
Illinois	1	Chicago Fire
Iowa	1	Des Moines Menace
Kansas	1	Sporting Kansas City
Maine	1	Portland Hearts of Pine
Maryland	1	Ristozi FC
Minnesota	1	Minnesota United FC
Nebraska	1	Union Omaha
New Mexico	1	New Mexico United
Ohio	1	Columbus Crew
Oklahoma	1	FC Tulsa
Rhode Island	1	Rhode Island FC
Vermont	1	Vermont Green FC
Washington	1	Spokane Velocity FC
Washington D.C.	1	DC United
Wisconsin	1	Forward Madison FC

=== Open Cup debuts ===
8 teams made their Open Cup debuts in the 2026 tournament.

- NPSL: Cruizers FC
- UPSL: Valley 559 FC, Kalonji Pro-Profile, Badgers FC
- APSL: SC Vistula Garfield
- The League for Clubs: San Ramon FC
- Local: BOHFS St. Louis

== Early rounds ==
The first round of the tournament was drawn on January 27, 2026.

On February 23, 2026, South Georgia Tormenta FC went on hiatus and withdrew from the 2026 USL League One and U.S. Open Cup.

Number of teams per tier still in competition
Division I (Note: Division I teams joined the competition in the Round of 32.)	Division II	Division III	Open Division	Total
16 / 16	17 / 17	15 / 15	32 / 32	80 / 80

First round March 17–19; March 25
USLC	(Pennsylvania) Pittsburgh Riverhounds SC	2
USL2	(Pennsylvania) Steel City FC	1
MLSNP	(North Carolina) Carolina Core FC	1
UPSL	Virginia Dream FC	2
USL2	(North Carolina) Asheville City SC	3
USL1	(South Carolina) Greenville Triumph SC	1
APSL	(New Jersey) SC Vistula Garfield	1
USL1	(Tennessee) One Knoxville SC	3
USL1	(Florida) FC Naples	3
NPSL	(Florida) Red Force FC	0
USL1	(Georgia (U.S. state)) ~~South Georgia Tormenta FC~~
UPSL	(Florida) FC America CFL Spurs	w/o
USLC	(Indiana) Indy Eleven	3
USL2	(Iowa) Des Moines Menace	0
MPL	(Missouri) BOHFS St. Louis	0
USL1	(Nebraska) Union Omaha	8
USL1	(North Carolina) Charlotte Independence	4
NPSL	(Maryland) Ristozi FC	1
USLC	(South Carolina) Charleston Battery	2
UPSL	(Florida) Badgers FC	1
USL1	(California) AV Alta FC	0
UPSL	(California) Valley 559 FC	1
USLC	(California) Sacramento Republic FC (a.e.t.)	2
NPSL	(California) El Farolito	0
MLSNP	(Tennessee) Chattanooga FC	2
UPSL	(Georgia (U.S. state)) Kalonji Pro-Profile	1
UPSL	Tennessee Tempo FC	1
USL1	(Tennessee) Chattanooga Red Wolves SC	0
USL1	(Virginia) Richmond Kickers	2
USL2	Northern Virginia FC	0
USLP	(Pennsylvania) West Chester United SC	1
USLC	(Virginia) Loudoun United FC	2
USLC	Rhode Island FC	4
BSSL	(Massachusetts) CD Faialense	0
NPSL	(New Jersey) FC Motown	0
USLC	(Connecticut) Hartford Athletic	2
USL2	Vermont Green FC	1
USL1	(Maine) Portland Hearts of Pine	0
USL1	(New York (state)) Westchester SC	2
UPSL	(New York (state)) NY Renegades FC	0
USLC	(Kentucky) Lexington SC	9
NPSL	(New York (state)) Flower City Union	0
USLC	(Kentucky) Louisville City FC	2
UPSL	Southern Indiana FC	0
USL2	(Michigan) Flint City Bucks	2
USL1	(Wisconsin) Forward Madison FC	0
USLC	(Michigan) Detroit City FC	5
NPSL	Michigan Rangers	1
USLC	Colorado Springs Switchbacks FC	3
UPSL	(Colorado) Azteca FC	0
USL2	(California) Ventura County Fusion	1
USL1	(Washington (state)) Spokane Velocity FC	2
USLC	(Texas) San Antonio FC	6
HFA	(Texas) ASC New Stars	0
USL2	(Arkansas) Little Rock Rangers	2
USLC	(Oklahoma) FC Tulsa	4
USLC	New Mexico United	3
NPSL	(California) Cruizers FC	2
USL2	(Texas) Laredo Heat	0
USLC	(Texas) El Paso Locomotive FC	2
USLC	(California) Orange County SC	3
UPSL	(California) Laguna United FC	0
USLC	(Arizona) Phoenix Rising FC	4
LFC	(California) San Ramon FC	0

Second round March 31 – April 1
USLC	(Pennsylvania) Pittsburgh Riverhounds SC	2
UPSL	Virginia Dream FC	0
USL2	(North Carolina) Asheville City SC	1 (2)
USL1	(Tennessee) One Knoxville SC (p)	1 (3)
USL1	(Florida) FC Naples	3
UPSL	(Florida) FC America CFL Spurs	0
USLC	(Indiana) Indy Eleven	1
USL1	(Nebraska) Union Omaha	2
USL1	(North Carolina) Charlotte Independence	3
USLC	(South Carolina) Charleston Battery	2
UPSL	(California) Valley 559 FC	0
USLC	(California) Sacramento Republic FC	4
MLSNP	(Tennessee) Chattanooga FC	1
UPSL	Tennessee Tempo FC	0
USL1	(Virginia) Richmond Kickers	1
USLC	(Virginia) Loudoun United FC	0
USLC	Rhode Island FC	2
USLC	(Connecticut) Hartford Athletic	0
USL2	Vermont Green FC	0 (3)
USL1	(New York (state)) Westchester SC (p)	0 (4)
USLC	(Kentucky) Lexington SC	0
USLC	(Kentucky) Louisville City FC	2
USL2	(Michigan) Flint City Bucks	0
USLC	(Michigan) Detroit City FC	1
USLC	Colorado Springs Switchbacks FC (p)	1 (4)
USL1	(Washington (state)) Spokane Velocity FC	1 (2)
USLC	(Texas) San Antonio FC	0
USLC	(Oklahoma) FC Tulsa (a.e.t.)	1
USLC	New Mexico United	0
USLC	(Texas) El Paso Locomotive FC	4
USLC	(California) Orange County SC	1
USLC	(Arizona) Phoenix Rising FC (a.e.t.)	2

=== First round ===
The draw for the first round, including match dates and times, was announced on January 27, 2026.

March 17	South Georgia Tormenta FC (USL1) (Georgia (U.S. state))	0–1 (walkover)	(Florida) FC America CFL Spurs (UPSL)	Statesboro, Georgia
				Stadium: Tormenta Stadium

March 17	Richmond Kickers (USL1) (Virginia)	2–0	Northern Virginia FC (USL2)	Richmond, Virginia
6:30 p.m. ET	Kirkland 31'; Dourado 89'	Report		Stadium: City Stadium; Attendance: 1,663; Referee: Chuck Roberts

March 17	Rhode Island FC (USLC)	4–0	(Massachusetts) CD Faialense (BSSL)	Pawtucket, Rhode Island
7:00 p.m. ET	Rovira 13'; Williams 26'; Scardina 78'; Willis 80' (o.g.)	Report		Stadium: Centreville Bank Stadium; Attendance: 1,156; Referee: Joseph Poremba

March 17	Vermont Green FC (USL2)	1–0	(Maine) Portland Hearts of Pine (USL1)	Burlington, Vermont
7:00 p.m. ET	Ismail 40'	Report		Stadium: Virtue Field; Attendance: 2,500; Referee: Gurhan Dolgun

March 17	Detroit City FC (USLC) (Michigan)	5–1	Michigan Rangers (NPSL)	Brighton, Michigan
7:30 p.m. ET	Tabortetaka 22', 86'; Rodriguez 56'; Dalou 65'; Diouf 81'	Report	Barone 6'	Stadium: Legacy Center; Attendance: 675; Referee: Ryan Homik

March 17	West Chester United SC (USLP) (Pennsylvania)	1–2	(Virginia) Loudoun United FC (USLC)	Wayne, Pennsylvania
7:30 p.m. ET	Martin 84'	Report	Dias 3'; Amoh 21'	Stadium: YSC Sports; Attendance: 200; Referee: Stephen Foster

March 17	Colorado Springs Switchbacks (USLC)	3–0	(Colorado) Azteca FC (UPSL)	Colorado Springs, Colorado
8:00 p.m. ET	Fjellberg 6'; Masereka 82'; Bennett 86'	Report		Stadium: Weidner Field; Attendance: 1,500; Referee: Adam Rice

March 17	Indy Eleven (USLC) (Indiana)	3–0	(Iowa) Des Moines Menace (USL2)	Westfield, Indiana
8:00 p.m. ET	Mesanvi 31'; Okello 60'; Sharp 75'	Report		Stadium: Grand Park Sports Campus; Attendance: 3,073; Referee: Alex Beehler

March 17	Phoenix Rising FC (USLC) (Arizona)	4–0	(California) San Ramon FC (LFC)	Phoenix, Arizona
10:00 p.m. ET	Avayevu 15'; Carvajal 45+2'; Vukovic 90'; Hernandez 90+4'	Report		Stadium: Phoenix Rising Soccer Stadium; Attendance: 2,274; Referee: Edgar Sanchez Beltran

March 18	Chattanooga FC (MLSNP) (Tennessee)	2–1	(Georgia (U.S. state)) Kalonji Pro Profile (UPSL)	Chattanooga, Tennessee
6:00 p.m. ET	Ortiz 45+1'; Mohand 46'		Kalonji 13'	Stadium: Finley Stadium; Attendance: 2,139; Referee: Amin Hadzic

March 18	Asheville City SC (USL2) (North Carolina)	3–1	(South Carolina) Greenville Triumph SC (USL1)	Asheville, North Carolina
6:30 p.m. ET	Southern 13'; Bilow 82'; Fall 90+9'	Report	Boyce 19'	Stadium: Greenwood Soccer Field; Attendance: 500; Referee: Kevin Broadley

March 18	Charleston Battery (USLC) (South Carolina)	2–1	Florida Badgers FC (UPSL)	Mount Pleasant, South Carolina
6:30 p.m. ET	Swan 21', 90+12'	Report	Altidor 66'	Stadium: Patriots Point Soccer Complex; Attendance: 500; Referee: Tiago Don Santos

March 18	FC Motown (NPSL) (New Jersey)	0–2	(Connecticut) Hartford Athletic (USLC)	Newark, New Jersey
7:00 p.m. ET		Report	Presthus 33'; Hernández 51'	Stadium: Lubetkin Field at Mal Simon Stadium; Attendance: 206; Referee: Devin Dragon

March 18	FC Naples (USL1) (Florida)	3–0	(Florida) Red Force FC (NPSL)	Naples, Florida
7:00 p.m. ET	Torrellas 23'; Gay 30'; Gray 90+2'			Stadium: Paradise Coast Sports Complex; Attendance: 2,283; Referee: Jorge Escobar

March 18	Louisville City FC (USLC) (Kentucky)	2–0	(Indiana) Southern Indiana FC (UPSL)	Louisville, Kentucky
7:00 p.m. ET	Showunmi 20', 30'	Report		Stadium: Lynn Family Stadium; Attendance: 1,780; Referee: Salvador Flores

March 18	SC Vistula Garfield (APSL) (New Jersey)	1–3	(Tennessee) One Knoxville SC (USL1)	Garfield, New Jersey
7:30 p.m. ET	Gorczowski 1'	Report	Diene 13'; Gill 21'; Gøling 76'	Stadium: Garfield High School Stadium; Attendance: 250; Referee: Danielle Cornetta

March 18	BOHFS St. Louis (MPL) (Missouri)	0–8	(Nebraska) Union Omaha (USL1)	St. Louis, Missouri
8:00 p.m. ET		Report	Cabral 11'; Guediri 21'; Borczak 34'; Owusu 49', 90'; Ors 72', 74'; Botello-Faz 81'	Stadium: Harlen C. Hunter Stadium; Attendance: 2,100

March 18	Little Rock Rangers (USL2) (Arkansas)	2–4	(Oklahoma) FC Tulsa (USLC)	Little Rock, Arkansas
8:00 p.m. ET	Kistmann 51'; Turner 85'	Report	St Clair 19'; Webber 32'; Batista 70'; Pierre 85'	Stadium: Episcopal Collegiate School; Attendance: 1,200 or 600; Referee: Carson Alston

March 18	San Antonio FC (USLC) (Texas)	6–0	(Texas) ASC New Stars (HFA)	San Antonio, Texas
8:30 p.m. ET	Souahy 15'; Calov 37'; Sorto 59' (pen.), 68'; Erofeev 64'; Johnson 73'			Stadium: Toyota Field; Attendance: 1,766; Referee: Edgar García

March 18	New Mexico United (USLC)	3–2	(California) Cruizers FC (NPSL)	Albuquerque, New Mexico
9:30 p.m. ET	Flores 12' (o.g.); Gilchrist 38'; Nava 90'	Report	Mbumba 16', 45+3'	Stadium: UNM Soccer Complex; Attendance: 857

March 18	Sacramento Republic FC (USLC) (California)	2–0 (a.e.t.)	(California) El Farolito (NPSL)	Sacramento, California
10:00 p.m. ET	Ajago 95', 120+2'	Report		Stadium: Heart Health Park; Attendance: 2,430; Referee: Steven Cardozo

March 18	AV Alta FC (USL1) (California)	0–1	(California) Valley 559 FC (UPSL)	Lancaster, California
10:30 p.m. ET		Report	Amarikwa 65'	Stadium: Lancaster Municipal Stadium; Attendance: 1,518; Referee: Rafael Bonilla

March 18	Ventura County Fusion (USL2) (California)	1–2	(Washington (state)) Spokane Velocity (USL1)	Ventura, California
10:30 p.m. ET	Fofanah 79' (pen.)	Report	Peláez 20'; Gallardo 89' (pen.)	Stadium: Ventura College Sportsplex; Attendance: 300; Referee: Felix Granados

March 18	Orange County SC (USLC) (California)	3–0	(California) Laguna United FC (UPSL)	Irvine, California
10:30 p.m. ET	Kelly 25'; Doghman 29'; Hegardt 75'	Report		Stadium: Championship Soccer Stadium; Attendance: 1,521; Referee: Juma Abdu-Razzaq

March 19	Carolina Core FC (MLSNP) (North Carolina)	1–2	Virginia Dream FC (UPSL)	High Point, North Carolina
6:00 p.m. ET	Zeegers 52'	Report	Diarra 58'; Akinkoye 78'	Stadium: Truist Point; Attendance: 1,091; Referee: Yannick Rothfuss

March 19	Charlotte Independence (USL1) (North Carolina)	4–1	(Maryland) Ristozi FC (NPSL)	Matthews, North Carolina
6:30 p.m. ET	Dimick 4'; Martinez 69'; Ngah 87'; Jaime 89'	Report	Ono 38'	Stadium: Mecklenburg County Sportsplex at Matthews; Attendance: 682; Referee: MJ Tehini

March 19	Flint City Bucks (USL2) (Michigan)	2–0	(Wisconsin) Forward Madison FC (USL1)	Grand Blanc, Michigan
6:30 p.m. ET	Gyamfi 13' (o.g.); Lopez 67'	Report		Stadium: Don Batchelor Field; Attendance: 3,027; Referee: Quinton Mcfarlen

March 19	Lexington SC (USLC) (Kentucky)	9–0	(New York (state)) Flower City Union (NPSL)	Lexington, Kentucky
7:00 p.m. ET	Firmino 30', 48'; Molloy 36'; Epps 40'; Zengue 53'; Goodrum 61'; Ferri 68'; Henry-Scott 76'; Scott 83' (pen.)	Report		Stadium: Lexington SC Stadium; Attendance: 1,894; Referee: Promise Adebayo-Ige

March 19	Westchester SC (USL1) (New York (state))	2–0	(New York (state)) NY Renegades FC (UPSL)	Mount Vernon, New York
7:30 p.m. ET	Burko 34' (pen.), 83'	Report		Stadium: The Stadium at Memorial Field; Attendance: 100; Referee: Leonel Brito

March 19	Tennessee Tempo FC (UPSL)	1–0	(Tennessee) Chattanooga Red Wolves SC (USL1)	Murfreesboro, Tennessee
8:15 p.m. ET	Oyirwoth 34'	Report		Stadium: Richard Siegel Soccer Complex; Attendance: 125; Referee: Donovan Eubank

March 19	Laredo Heat SC (USL2) (Texas)	0–2	(Texas) El Paso Locomotive FC (USLC)	Laredo, Texas
8:30 p.m. ET		Report	Abitia 51'; Rubín 89'	Stadium: PEG Energy Stadium; Attendance: 450; Referee: Edgar García

March 25	Pittsburgh Riverhounds SC (USLC) (Pennsylvania)	2–1	(Pennsylvania) Steel City FC (USL2)	Pittsburgh, Pennsylvania
7:00 p.m. ET	Griffin 6'; Ahl 66'	Report	Graeca 76' (pen.)	Stadium: Highmark Stadium; Attendance: 4,287; Referee: Samuel Reynolds

=== Second round ===
The draw for the second round, including match dates and times, was announced on March 20, 2026.

March 31	Pittsburgh Riverhounds SC (USLC) (Pennsylvania)	2–0	Virginia Dream FC (UPSL)	Pittsburgh, Pennsylvania
7:00 p.m. ET	Griffin 51'; Goldthorp 59' (pen.)	Report		Stadium: Highmark Stadium; Attendance: 1,817; Referee: Shevket Dzhaparov

March 31	Asheville City SC (USL2) (North Carolina)	1–1 (a.e.t.) (2–3 p)	(Tennessee) One Knoxville SC (USL1)	Asheville, North Carolina
7:00 p.m. ET	Carlson 67' (pen.)	Report	Braudílio Rodrigues 33'	Stadium: Greenwood Soccer Field; Referee: Joe Surgan
	Penalties
	Carlson (penalty missed); Flood (penalty scored); Bilow (penalty scored); Pinto (penalty missed); Holmes (penalty missed)		(penalty missed) Gøling; (penalty scored) Skelton; (penalty scored) Conway; (penalty scored) Cordova

March 31	FC Naples (USL1) (Florida)	3–0	(Florida) FC America CFL Spurs (UPSL)	Naples, Florida
7:00 p.m. ET	Ferrín 3' (pen.); Cisneros 60'; Bachstein 90+2'	Report		Stadium: Paradise Coast Sports Complex; Attendance: 1,964; Referee: Edson Carvajal

March 31	Indy Eleven (USLC) (Indiana)	1–2	(Nebraska) Union Omaha (USL1)	Indianapolis, Indiana
7:00 p.m. ET	Blake 90+3'	Report	Owusu 75'; Tekiela 83'	Stadium: Michael A. Carroll Stadium; Attendance: 3,469; Referee: John Griggs

March 31	Charlotte Independence (USL1) (North Carolina)	3–2	(South Carolina) Charleston Battery (USLC)	Matthews, North Carolina
7:30 p.m. ET	Marou 37'; Álvarez 58'; Ortiz 118'	Report	Houssou 70'; Foester 77'	Stadium: Sportsplex at Matthews; Attendance: 400; Referee: Kevin Broadley

March 31	Valley 559 FC (UPSL) (California)	0–4	(California) Sacramento Republic FC (USLC)	Clovis, California
10:00 p.m. ET		Report	Desmond 11'; Wanner 36'; Edwards 38', 64'	Stadium: Clovis East High School; Attendance: 1,200; Referee: Robert Vincze

April 1	Chattanooga FC (MLSNP) (Tennessee)	1–0	(Tennessee) Tennessee Tempo FC (UPSL)	Chattanooga, Tennessee
6:00 p.m. ET	Koehler 44'	Report		Stadium: Finley Stadium; Attendance: 2,857; Referee: Kyle Johnston

April 1	Richmond Kickers (USL1) (Virginia)	1–0	(Virginia) Loudoun United FC (USLC)	Richmond, Virginia
6:30 p.m. ET	Dourado 90+6'	Report		Stadium: City Stadium; Attendance: 1,243; Referee: Matthew Corrigan

April 1	Rhode Island FC (USLC)	2–0	(Connecticut) Hartford Athletic (USLC)	Pawtucket, Rhode Island
7:00 p.m. ET	Sanchez 12'; Williams 30'	Report		Stadium: Centreville Bank Stadium; Attendance: 4,857; Referee: John Matto

April 1	Vermont Green FC (USL2) (Vermont)	0–0 (a.e.t.) (3–4 p)	(New York (state)) Westchester SC (USL1)	Burlington, Vermont
7:00 p.m. ET		Report		Stadium: Virtue Field; Attendance: 2,600; Referee: Thomas Snyder
	Penalties
	Millar (penalty missed); Hall (penalty scored); Akulov (penalty scored); Moloney (penalty scored); Baker (penalty missed); Miller (penalty missed)		(penalty scored) Conor McGlynn; (penalty missed) Armas; (penalty scored) Burko; (penalty missed) Blommestijn; (penalty scored) Mackic; (penalty scored) Vásquez

April 1	Lexington SC (USLC) (Kentucky)	0–2	(Kentucky) Louisville City FC (USLC)	Lexington, Kentucky
7:00 p.m. ET		Report	Niang 23'; Showunmi 51'	Stadium: Lexington SC Stadium; Attendance: 4,406; Referee: Amin Hadzic

April 1	Flint City Bucks (USL2) (Michigan)	0–1	(Michigan) Detroit City FC (USLC)	Grand Blanc, Michigan
7:30 p.m. ET		Report	Dalou 40'	Stadium: Don Batchelor Field; Attendance: 2,700; Referee: Atahan Yaya

April 1	Colorado Springs Switchbacks (USLC)	1–1 (a.e.t.) (4–2 p)	(Washington (state)) Spokane Velocity (USL1)	Colorado Springs, Colorado
8:00 p.m. ET	Maples 45'	Report	Booth 87'	Stadium: Weidner Field; Attendance: 1,613; Referee: Drew Klemp
	Penalties
	Bennett (penalty scored); Perez (penalty scored); Maples (penalty missed); Hanya (penalty scored); Masereka (penalty scored)		(penalty missed) Peláez; (penalty missed) Fitch; (penalty scored) Hernández; (penalty scored) Lewis

April 1	San Antonio FC (USLC) (Texas)	0–1 (a.e.t.)	(Oklahoma) FC Tulsa (USLC)	San Antonio, Texas
8:30 p.m. ET		Report	Cabral 105'	Stadium: Toyota Field; Attendance: 2,434; Referee: Muhammad Kaleia

April 1	New Mexico United (USLC) (New Mexico)	0–4	(Texas) El Paso Locomotive FC (USLC)	Albuquerque, New Mexico
9:30 p.m. ET		Report	Quezada 37'; Mendez 63'; Rubín 69'; Calvillo 86'	Stadium: UNM Soccer Complex; Attendance: 1,100; Referee: Rodrigo Albuquerque

April 1	Orange County SC (USLC) (California)	1–2 (a.e.t.)	(Arizona) Phoenix Rising FC (USLC)	Irvine, California
10:00 p.m. ET	Sylla 85'	Report	Studenthofft 35'; Vukovic 96'	Stadium: Championship Soccer Stadium; Attendance: 732; Referee: Mark Verso

== Round of 32 and 16 ==
=== Bracket ===
Teams were divided into eight roughly geographical groups of four teams each, named after the eight most-capped U.S. national team players to have won the Open Cup: Cobi Jones, Jeff Agoos, Landon Donovan, Clint Dempsey, DaMarcus Beasley, Carlos Bocanegra, Paul Caligiuri and Kasey Keller. As part of the procedure, a home field priority order was also drawn for the round of 16.

Round of 32; April 14–15
MLS	(Massachusetts) New England Revolution (p)	1 (3)
USLC	Rhode Island FC	1 (1)
USL1	(Florida) FC Naples	0
MLS	(Florida) Orlando City SC	1
USL1	(Virginia) Richmond Kickers	0
MLS	(Ohio) Columbus Crew	3
MLS	(Washington, D.C.) DC United	3 (5)
USL1	(Tennessee) One Knoxville SC (p)	3 (6)
MLS	(New Jersey) New York Red Bulls	3
USLC	(Pennsylvania) Pittsburgh Riverhounds SC	1
USL1	(New York (state)) Westchester SC	2
MLS	(New York (state)) New York City FC	5
MLS	(North Carolina) Charlotte FC	6
USL1	(North Carolina) Charlotte Independence	0
MLSNP	(Tennessee) Chattanooga FC	1
MLS	(Georgia (U.S. state)) Atlanta United FC	3
USLC	(Michigan) Detroit City FC	1
MLS	(Illinois) Chicago Fire FC	2
MLS	(Missouri) St. Louis City SC	4
USLC	(Oklahoma) FC Tulsa	0
MLS	(Texas) Houston Dynamo FC	4
USLC	(Texas) El Paso Locomotive FC	1
USLC	(Kentucky) Louisville City FC	2
MLS	(Texas) Austin FC	1
MLS	Colorado Rapids	1
USL1	(Nebraska) Union Omaha	0
USLC	Colorado Springs Switchbacks FC	3
MLS	Sporting Kansas City	0
MLS	(California) San Jose Earthquakes	2
USLC	(Arizona) Phoenix Rising FC	0
USLC	(California) Sacramento Republic FC	0 (8)
MLS	Minnesota United FC (p)	0 (9)

Round of 16; April 28–29
MLS	(Massachusetts) New England Revolution	3
MLS	(Florida) Orlando City SC	4
MLS	(Ohio) Columbus Crew	4
USL1	(Tennessee) One Knoxville SC	1
MLS	(New Jersey) New York Red Bulls	1
MLS	(New York (state)) New York City FC	3
MLS	(North Carolina) Charlotte FC	0
MLS	(Georgia (U.S. state)) Atlanta United FC	2
MLS	(Illinois) Chicago Fire FC	1
MLS	(Missouri) St. Louis City SC	2
MLS	(Texas) Houston Dynamo FC (a.e.t.)	2
USLC	(Kentucky) Louisville City FC	1
MLS	Colorado Rapids (p)	2 (5)
USLC	Colorado Springs Switchbacks FC	2 (4)
MLS	(California) San Jose Earthquakes	4
MLS	Minnesota United FC	2

=== Round of 32 ===
Number of teams per tier still in competition
Division I	Division II	Division III	Open Division	Total
16 / 16	9 / 17	7 / 15	0 / 32	32 / 80

==== Teams ====
Teams for Round of 32 draw
Previous round winners	New entrants (MLS)
Charlotte Independence (USL1); Chattanooga FC (MLSNP); Colorado Springs Switchbacks FC (USLC); Detroit City FC (USLC); El Paso Locomotive FC (USLC); FC Naples (USL1); FC Tulsa (USLC); Louisville City FC (USLC); One Knoxville SC (USL1); Phoenix Rising FC (USLC); Pittsburgh Riverhounds SC (USLC); Rhode Island FC (USLC); Richmond Kickers (USL1); Sacramento Republic FC (USLC); Union Omaha (USL1); Westchester SC (USL1)	Atlanta United FC; Austin FC; Charlotte FC; Chicago Fire FC; Colorado Rapids; Columbus Crew; D.C. United; Houston Dynamo FC; Minnesota United FC; New England Revolution; New York City FC; New York Red Bulls; Orlando City SC; San Jose Earthquakes; St. Louis City SC; Sporting Kansas City

Cobi Jones Group

April 14	New England Revolution (Massachusetts)	1–1 (a.e.t.) (3–1 p)	(Rhode Island) Rhode Island FC	Pawtucket, Rhode Island
7:00 PM ET	Fagundez 51'	Report	Williams 90+11'	Stadium: Centreville Bank Stadium; Attendance: 6,023; Referee: Atahan Yaya
	Penalties
	Langoni (penalty scored); Farrell (penalty scored); Feingold (penalty missed); Beason (penalty scored)		(penalty scored) Diop; (penalty missed) Kwizera; (penalty missed) Afonso; (penalty missed) Williams

April 15	FC Naples (Florida)	0–1	(Florida) Orlando City SC	Naples, Florida
7:00 PM ET		Report	Spicer 18'	Stadium: Paradise Coast Sports Complex; Attendance: 4,782; Referee: Elvis Osmanovic

Jeff Agoos Group

April 15	Richmond Kickers (Virginia)	0–3	(Ohio) Columbus Crew	Richmond, Virginia
7:30 PM ET		Report	Picard 41', 63'; Thiaré 73'	Stadium: City Stadium; Attendance: 5,046; Referee: Deny Kulasinac

April 15	DC United (Washington, D.C.)	3–3 (a.e.t.) (5–6 p)	(Tennessee) One Knoxville SC	Washington D.C.
7:30 PM ET	Peltola 61'; Markovic 83'; Peglow 97'	Report	Diene 75'; Krioutchenkov 78', 113'	Stadium: Audi Field; Attendance: 6,508; Referee: Matthew Corrigan
	Penalties
	Peglow (penalty scored); Kurokawa (penalty scored); Hefti (penalty scored); Murrell (penalty scored); Peltola (penalty scored); Pirani (penalty missed)		(penalty scored) Krioutchenkov; (penalty scored) Rodrigues; (penalty scored) Gøling; (penalty scored) Conway; (penalty scored) Fernandez; (penalty scored) Linhares

Landon Donovan Group

April 14	Westchester SC (New York (state))	2–5	(New York (state)) New York City FC	Mount Vernon, New York
7:30 PM ET	Burko 22'; Evans 83'	Report	Ojeda 13'; Magno 25' (pen.), 36', 70'; Farnós 41'	Stadium: The Stadium at Memorial Field; Attendance: 5,145; Referee: Muhammad Hassan

April 15	New York Red Bulls (New Jersey)	3–1	(Pennsylvania) Pittsburgh Riverhounds SC	Harrison, New Jersey
7:30 PM ET	Forsberg 25'; Hall 28', 47'	Report	Amann 79'	Stadium: Sports Illustrated Stadium; Attendance: 4,500; Referee: Jeremy Scheer

Clint Dempsey Group

April 15	Charlotte FC (North Carolina)	6–0	(North Carolina) Charlotte Independence	Matthews, North Carolina
7:00 PM ET	Goodwin 45+1'; Kessler 60'; Berchimas 68'; Schnegg 73'; Vargas 86'; Coulibaly 89'	Report		Stadium: Sportsplex at Matthews; Attendance: 3,684; Referee: Matthew Thompson

April 15	Chattanooga FC (Tennessee)	1–3	(Georgia (U.S. state)) Atlanta United	Chattanooga, Tennessee
7:30 PM EDT	Tcheuyap 6'	Report	Togashi 21'; Picault 64'; Amador 75'	Stadium: Finley Stadium; Attendance: 5,292; Referee: Igor Bych

DaMarcus Beasley Group

April 14	Detroit City FC (Michigan)	1–2	(Illinois) Chicago Fire FC	Hamtramck, Michigan
7:30 PM ET	Smith 78'	Report	Shokalook 34', 36'	Stadium: Keyworth Stadium; Attendance: 6,229; Referee: Abdou Ndiaye

April 15	St. Louis City SC (Missouri)	4–0	(Oklahoma) FC Tulsa	St. Louis, Missouri
8:00 PM ET	Hartel 20'; Jeong Sang-Bin 36'; Joyner 61'; Ostrák 78'	Report		Stadium: Energizer Park; Attendance: 2,733; Referee: Servando Berna Rico

Carlos Bocanegra Group

April 14	Louisville City FC (Kentucky)	2–1	(Texas) Austin FC	Louisville, Kentucky
7:00 PM ET	Totsch 26'; Showunmi 32'	Report	Fodrey 70'	Stadium: Lynn Family Stadium; Attendance: 6,023; Referee: Calin Radosav

April 15	Houston Dynamo (Texas)	4–1	(Texas) El Paso Locomotive FC	Houston, Texas
8:00 PM ET	Lingr 2'; Bogusz 46'; Markanich 58'; Ponce 80'	Report	Avila 75'	Stadium: Shell Energy Stadium; Attendance: 3,277; Referee: Trevor Wiseman

Paul Caligiuri Group

April 14	Colorado Springs Switchbacks FC	3–0	(Kansas) Sporting Kansas City	Colorado Springs, Colorado
8:00 PM ET	Tejada 11'; Masereka 31'; Bennett 83'	Report		Stadium: Weidner Field; Attendance: 1,902; Referee: Corbyn May

April 14	Colorado Rapids	1–0	(Nebraska) Union Omaha	Commerce City, Colorado
9:30 PM ET	Sealy 21'	Report		Stadium: Dick's Sporting Goods Park; Attendance: 1,629; Referee: Alyssa Pennington

Kasey Keller Group

April 14	Sacramento Republic FC (California)	0–0 (a.e.t.) (8–9 p)	Minnesota United FC	Sacramento, California
10:00 PM ET		Report		Stadium: Heart Health Park; Attendance: 7,513; Referee: Robert Vincze
	Penalties
	Wanner (penalty scored); Benítez (penalty scored); Essel (penalty missed); Rivas (penalty scored); Cambridge (penalty missed); Ajago (penalty scored); Rodriguez (penalty scored); Desmond (penalty scored); Kleemann (penalty scored); Ukaegbu (penalty scored); Vitiello (penalty missed); Wanner (penalty missed)		(penalty scored) Pereyra; (penalty scored) Chancalay; (penalty missed) Gene; (penalty scored) Triantis; (penalty missed) Markanich; (penalty scored) Trapp; (penalty scored) Harvey; (penalty scored) Díaz; (penalty scored) Gonzalez; (penalty scored) Padelford; (penalty missed) Smir; (penalty scored) Pereyra

April 15	San Jose Earthquakes (California)	2–0	(Arizona) Phoenix Rising FC	San Jose, California
10:00 PM ET	Fernandez 3'; Jasinski 23'	Report		Stadium: Paypal Park; Attendance: 7,868; Referee: Elton García

=== Round of 16 ===
Number of teams per tier still in competition
Division I	Division II	Division III	Open Division	Total
13 / 16	2 / 17	1 / 15	0 / 32	16 / 80

April 28	Charlotte FC (North Carolina)	0–2	(Georgia (U.S. state)) Atlanta United FC	Matthews, North Carolina
7:00 PM ET		Report	Miranchuk 22'; Sanchez 71'	Stadium: Sportsplex at Matthews; Attendance: 3,315

April 28	San Jose Earthquakes (California)	4–2	(Minnesota) Minnesota United FC	San Jose, California
10:00 PM ET	Leroux 15', 73'; Skahan 68'; Tsakiris 75'	Report	Vieira 59' (o.g.); Chancalay 63'	Stadium: PayPal Park; Attendance: 10,834

April 29	New York Red Bulls (New Jersey)	1–3	(New York (state)) New York City FC	Harrison, New Jersey
7:00 PM ET	Hall 14'	Report	Trewin 9'; Raul 39'; Martins 57'	Stadium: Sports Illustrated Stadium; Attendance: 9,000

April 29	New England Revolution (Massachusetts)	3–4	(Florida) Orlando City SC	Pawtucket, Rhode Island
7:00 PM ET	Fry 21'; Farrell 37'; Zambrano 58'	Report	Iago 31'; Dorsey 39'; Ellis 70'; Taifi 90+2'	Stadium: Centreville Bank Stadium; Attendance: 8,000

April 29	Columbus Crew (Ohio)	4–1	(Tennessee) One Knoxville SC	Columbus, Ohio
7:30 PM ET	Picard 10', 23'; Gazdag 72'; Adams 77'	Report	Rodrigues 11'	Stadium: ScottsMiracle-Gro Field; Attendance: 2,698

April 29	Chicago Fire FC (Illinois)	1–2	(Missouri) St. Louis City SC	Bridgeview, Illinois
8:00 PM ET	Salétros 63'	Report	Totland 71'; Löwen 78'	Stadium: SeatGeek Stadium; Attendance: 3,426

April 29	Houston Dynamo FC (Texas)	2–1 (a.e.t.)	(Kentucky) Louisville City FC	Houston, Texas
8:00 PM ET	Sviatchenko 89'; Ponce 101'	Report	Serrano 67'	Stadium: Shell Energy Stadium; Attendance: 2,991

April 29	Colorado Rapids	2–2 (a.e.t.) (5–4 p)	(Colorado) Colorado Springs Switchbacks FC	Commerce City, Colorado
9:00 PM ET	Manyoma 25'; Minoungou 114'	Report	Creek 34'; Bennett 120' (pen.)	Stadium: Dick's Sporting Goods Park; Attendance: 2,991
	Penalties
	R. Navarro (penalty scored); Holding (penalty scored); Herrington (penalty scored); Sealy (penalty scored); Minoungou (penalty missed); Atencio (penalty missed); Rosenberry (penalty scored)		(penalty scored) Bennett; (penalty scored) Tejada; (penalty missed) Williams; (penalty scored) Maples; (penalty scored) Magee; (penalty missed) Burner; (penalty missed) Fjellberg

== Quarterfinals and beyond ==
Quarterfinals; May 19–20
MLS	(Missouri) St. Louis City SC (p)	2 (4)
MLS	(Texas) Houston Dynamo FC	2 (2)
West
MLS	Colorado Rapids	2
MLS	(California) San Jose Earthquakes	0
MLS	(Florida) Orlando City SC	4
MLS	(Georgia (U.S. state)) Atlanta United FC	1
East
MLS	(Ohio) Columbus Crew	1
MLS	(New York (state)) New York City FC	0

Semifinals; September 16
MLS	(Missouri) St. Louis City SC	3
MLS	Colorado Rapids	0
MLS	(Florida) Orlando City SC	1
MLS	(Ohio) Columbus Crew	2

Final; October 21
MLS	(Missouri) St. Louis City SC (p)	0 (5)
MLS	(Ohio) Columbus Crew	0 (3)

=== Quarterfinals ===
Number of teams per tier still in competition
Division I	Division II	Division III	Open Division	Total
8 / 16	0 / 17	0 / 15	0 / 32	8 / 80

May 19	Orlando City SC (Florida)	4–1	(Georgia (U.S. state)) Atlanta United FC	Orlando, Florida
7:30 PM ET	Brekalo 5'; Dorsey 16'; Tiago 24', 45+4'	Report	Latte Lath 84'	Stadium: Inter&Co Stadium; Attendance: 14,254; Referee: Lorenzo Hernandez

May 19	St. Louis City SC (Missouri)	2–2 (a.e.t.) (4–2 p)	(Texas) Houston Dynamo FC	Saint Louis, Missouri
8:00 PM ET	Hartel 10', 51' (pen.)	Report	Bogusz 11'; Artur 42'	Stadium: Energizer Park; Referee: Sergii Demianchuk
	Penalties
	Löwen (penalty scored); Hartel (penalty scored); Baumgartl (penalty scored); Durkin (penalty scored)		(penalty missed) Guilherme; (penalty scored) Lingr; (penalty scored) Holmes; (penalty missed) Herrera

May 20	Columbus Crew (Ohio)	1–0	(New York (state)) New York City FC	Columbus, Ohio
7:30 PM ET	Arfsten 59'	Report		Stadium: ScottsMiracle-Gro Field; Referee: Marcos de Oliveira

May 20	Colorado Rapids	2–0	(California) San Jose Earthquakes	Commerce City, Colorado
10:00 PM ET	Yapi 40'; R. Navarro 45+10' (pen.)	Report		Stadium: Dick's Sporting Goods Park; Referee: Fotis Bazakos

=== Semifinals ===
Number of teams per tier still in competition
Division I	Division II	Division III	Open Division	Total
4 / 16	0 / 17	0 / 15	0 / 32	4 / 80

September 16	Columbus Crew (Ohio)	2–1	(Florida) Orlando City SC	Columbus, Ohio
7:00 pm ET	Martínez 9'; Méndez 52'	Report	M. Ojeda 40'	Stadium: ScottsMiracle-Gro Field; Referee: Joe Dickerson

September 16	Colorado Rapids (Colorado)	0–3	(Missouri) St. Louis City SC	Commerce City, Colorado
9:30 pm ET		Report	Jeong Sang-bin 32'; Becher 52'; Mățan 59'	Stadium: Dick's Sporting Goods Park; Referee: Alexis Da Silva

=== Final ===
The 2026 U.S. Open Cup final was held on October 21, with the winner earning a place in the 2027 CONCACAF Champions Cup.

October 21, 2026
20:00 EDT

Columbus Crew (Ohio)	0–0 (a.e.t.)	(Missouri) St. Louis City SC
	Report
Penalties
Rodríguez (penalty missed); Amundsen (penalty scored); Tapia (penalty scored); Herrera (penalty scored)	3–5	(penalty scored) Baumgartl; (penalty scored) MacNaughton; (penalty scored) Durkin; (penalty scored) Downs; (penalty scored) Edelman

ScottsMiracle-Gro Field, Columbus, Ohio
Attendance: 20,250
Referee: Guido Gonzales Jr.

== Broadcasting ==
As part of the second year of a two-year deal with U.S. Soccer, CBS Sports will broadcast games on Paramount+, with select games on the CBS Sports Golazo Network and CBS Sports Network. All remaining games will be broadcast on U.S. Soccer's YouTube channel.

== Top goalscorers ==
Team eliminated for this round.
Team was inactive for this round.

Rank	Player	Team	Goals	By round						
Rank	Player	Team	Goals	1R	2R	R32	R16	QF	SF	F
1	(France) Hugo Picard	Columbus Crew	4			2	2			
1	(England) Tola Showunmi	Louisville City FC	4	2	1	1				
3	(Jamaica) Khori Bennett	Colorado Springs Switchbacks FC	3	1		1	1			
3	(Norway) Daniel Burko	Westchester SC	3	2		1				
3	(United States) Julian Hall	New York Red Bulls	3			2	1			
3	(Germany) Marcel Hartel	St. Louis City SC	3			1		2		
3	(Brazil) Talles Magno	New York City FC	3			3				
3	(Ghana) Samuel Owusu	Union Omaha	3	2	1					
9	(Ghana) Forster Ajago	Sacramento Republic FC	2	2						
9	(Poland) Mateusz Bogusz	Houston Dynamo FC	2			1		1		
9	(Senegal) Babacar Diene	One Knoxville SC	2	1		1				
9	(United States) Griffin Dorsey	Orlando City SC	2				1	1		
9	(Brazil) Lucca Dourado	Richmond Kickers	2	1	1					
9	(Saint Vincent and the Grenadines) Kyle Edwards	Sacramento Republic FC	2		2					
9	(Brazil) Nicolas Firmino	Lexington SC	2	2						
9	(United States) Danny Griffin	Pittsburgh Riverhounds SC	2	1	1					
9	(Israel) Denis Krioutchenkov	One Knoxville SC	2			2				
9	(United States) Beau Leroux	San Jose Earthquakes	2				2			
9	(Uganda) Sadam Masereka	Colorado Springs Switchbacks FC	2	1		1				
9	(Democratic Republic of the Congo) Ariel Mbumba	Cruizers FC	2	2						
9	(Spain) Sergio Ors Navarro	Union Omaha	2	2						
9	(Argentina) Ezequiel Ponce	Houston Dynamo FC	2			1	1			
9	(Cameroon) Tabort Etaka Preston	Detroit City FC	2	2						
9	(Guinea-Bissau) Braudilio Rodrigues	One Knoxville SC	2		1		1			
9	(Guatemala) Rubio Rubin	El Paso Locomotive FC	2	1	1					
9	(South Korea) Jeong Sang-bin	St. Louis City SC	2			1			1	
9	(United States) Jason Shokalook	Chicago Fire FC	2			2				
9	(El Salvador) Christian Sorto	San Antonio FC	2	2						
9	(United States) Colton Swann	Charleston Battery	2	2						
9	(Brazil) Tiago	Orlando City SC	2					2		
9	(Serbia) Aleksandar Vukovic	Phoenix Rising FC	2	1	1					
9	(United States) JJ Williams	Rhode Island FC	2		1	1				
