= Giuliano Crognale =

Italian poet and painter (1770–1862)

Giuliano Crognale (10 July 1770 – 20 July 1862) was an Italian poet and painter, active in illuminated manuscripts and oil painting of sacred and historical subjects.

== Biography ==
He was born in Castel Frentano, province of Chieti, Abruzzo. His father was a physician. He initially studied literature and classics in a religious school and seminary in Lanciano. In 1787, he moved to Naples to study law. He gravitated to study painting under Raffaele Ciappa. In 1790, he moved to Rome, where he worked under the Sienese painter, Salvatore Tonci. Within a year he had returned to Lanciano.

During the 1790s, he showed sympathy for the Republican interests and this led to his incarceration by the local Bourbon authorities in Castelnuovo. He gained release by promising to write a panegyric poem about his captors. However, by 1799 he came under proscription again, and under a sentence of death, he fled into exile at Fermo until 1801, when he received amnesty. In his later years, he dedicated himself to writing polemics and poetry.

== Works ==
- Chiesa Santuario del Miracolo Eucaristico, Lanciano
- Chiesa di Santo Stefano, Castel Frentano
- Chiesa del Santissimo Rosario, Castel Frentano
- Santuario dell' Assunta, Castel Frentano
