= Castel Frentano =

- Comune
- Comune di Castel Frentano
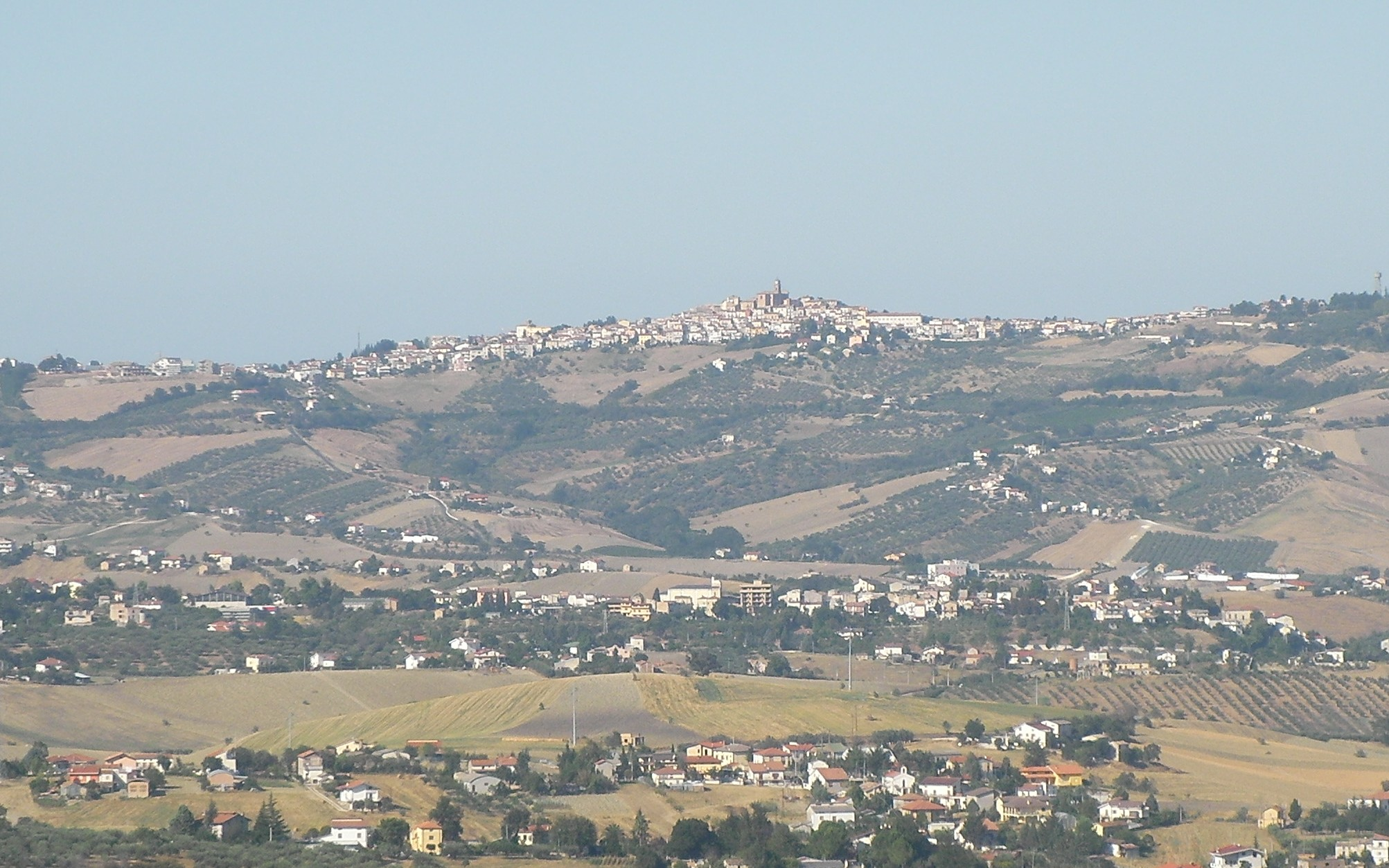

- Coat of arms

- Location within Italy Location within Abruzzo
- Coordinates: 42°12′N 14°21′E
- Country: Italy
- Region: Abruzzo
- Province: Chieti CH)
- Frazioni: Ciommi, Colle Ceraso, Crocetta, Feltrino, Lentesco, Pera, Pietragrossa, Porrechi, San Rocco, San Vincenzo, Trastulli

Government
  - Mayor: Patrizia De Santis Ciarrapico

Area
  - Total: 21.89 km^{2} (8.45 sq mi)
- Elevation: 400 m (1,300 ft)

Population (1 January 2023)
  - Total: 4,264
  - Density: 194.8/km^{2} (504.5/sq mi)
- Demonym: Castellini
- Time zone: UTC+1 (CET)
  - Summer (DST): UTC+2 (CEST)
- Postal code: 66032
- Dialing code: 0872
- Patron saint: St. Stephen
- Saint day: 3 August
- Website: Official website

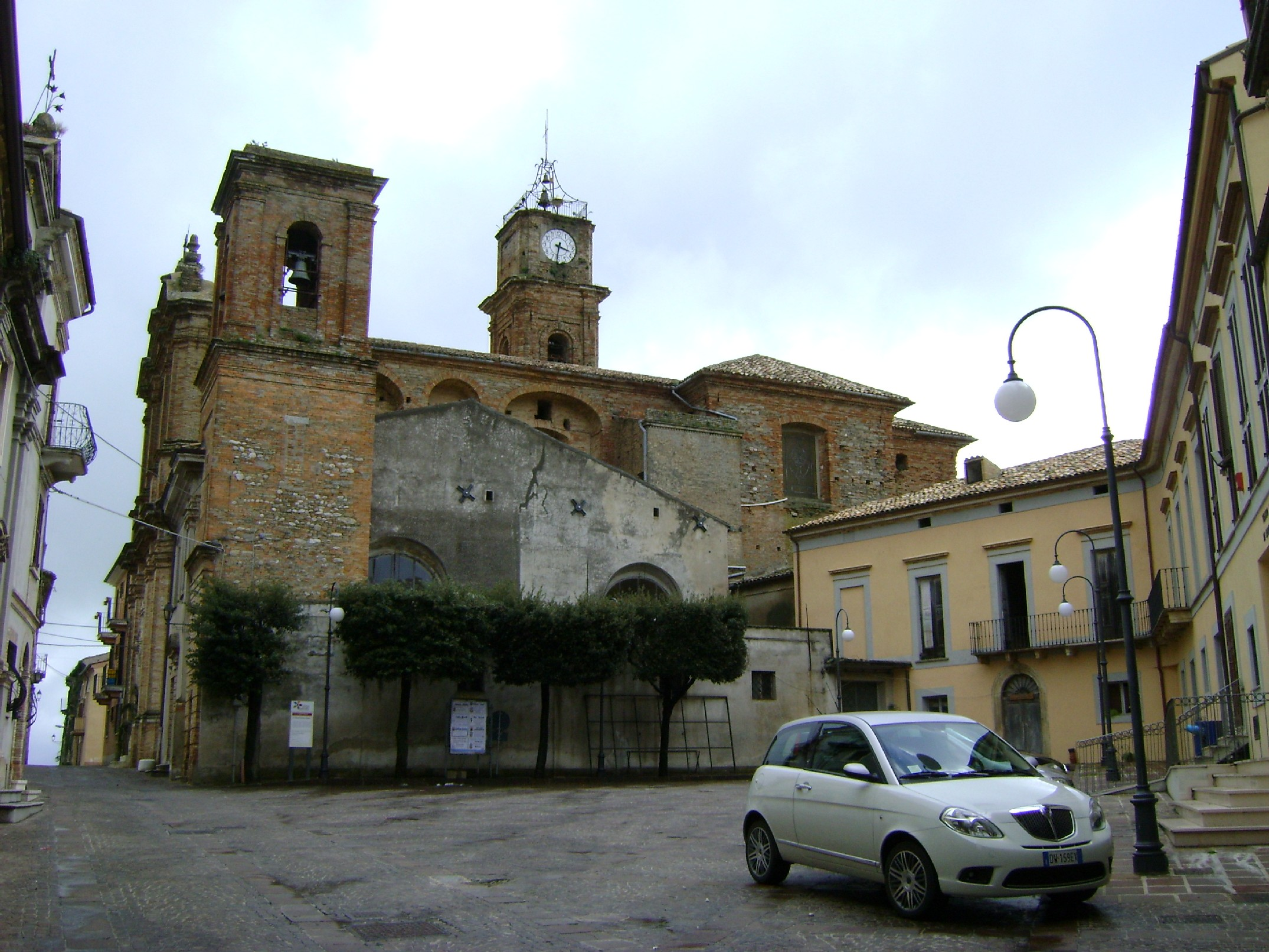
Santo Stefano Protomartire, a building in the town

Castel Frentano is a comune (municipality) in the province of Chieti, in the Italian region of Abruzzo.

During World War II, the town was liberated by the New Zealand Army (2nd New Zealand Division) on 2 December 1943.

It is known for bocconotto, a typical dessert.

== Main sights ==
- Church of St. Stephen, built in the late 13th and early 14th century, but rebuilt in the 18th century in neo-Classicist style
- Church of Santa Maria della Selva
- Church of San Rocco
- Palazzo Vergilj
- Palazzo Crognale
- 14th century defensive walls
