= Seacrest Country Day School =

Coordinates: 26.1367°N 81.7248°W

- 7100 Davis Boulevard; Naples, Florida 34104

Information
- Type: Independent, coeducational, college-preparatory school
- Established: 1983
- Heads of School: Dr. Kory Gallagher & Tyra Turner
- Head of Lower School: Tyra Turner
- Head of Middle School: Dr. Kory Gallagher
- Head of Upper School: Dr. Kory Gallagher
- Director of Enrollment: William Gledhill
- Staff: 90
- Grades: early learning through grade 12
- Enrollment: 450
- Colors: Blue and green
- Nickname: Stingrays
- Affiliations: National Association of Independent Schools, Southern Association of Independent Schools, Southern Association of Colleges and Schools
- Website: http://www.seacrest.org

Seacrest Country Day School is a private school in Naples, Florida that educates students from Preschool through 12th grade. Founded in 1983 by Dr. Jane Kern, Seacrest is a college-preparatory, co-educational independent school that, according to its mission, "fuels intellectual engagement, teaches ownership of the educational experience, cultivates quality of character, and inspires students to lead lives of significance."

The school is accredited by the National Association of Independent Schools, the Southern Association of Independent Schools, the Southern Association of Colleges and Schools, and the Florida Council of Independent Schools. It is also a founding member school of the Independent Curriculum Group, a "learning community of engaged academic leaders and schools working to promote the transformation of teaching and learning."

== Sports ==
=== Fall ===
- Cross Country
- Golf
- Volleyball
- Swimming and Diving

=== Winter ===
- Basketball
- Soccer

=== Spring ===
- Baseball
- Softball
- Track and Field
- Tennis
