= SC Vistula Garfield =

- Full name: Sport Club Vistula Garfield
- Nickname: Vistula
- Founded: 1952; 74 years ago
- Ground: Garfield High School Stadium, Garfield, New Jersey
- League: American Premier Soccer League
- Website: scvistula.soccer
Home colours

SC Vistula Garfield is an American amateur soccer club based in Garfield, New Jersey. Founded in 1952, the club is one of the oldest Polish-American soccer organizations in the United States. Vistula competes in regional amateur competitions and has participated in the Lamar Hunt U.S. Open Cup.

The club qualified for the 2026 U.S. Open Cup, marking its first appearance in the tournament proper since the 1970s.

== History ==
=== Founding and Polish heritage ===
SC Vistula Garfield was established in 1952 by members of the Polish immigrant community in northern New Jersey. The club takes its name from the Vistula River in Poland and has historically served as both an athletic organization and a cultural institution within the Polish-American community of Garfield.

Throughout the mid-20th century, Vistula competed in local and regional leagues as part of the ethnic club tradition common in American soccer during that period.

=== U.S. Open Cup appearances in the 1970s ===
Vistula entered the National Challenge Cup (now the Lamar Hunt U.S. Open Cup) during the 1970s, representing northern New Jersey in national competition. While the club did not advance to the latter stages, these appearances marked its first participation in the country’s national championship tournament organized by the United States Soccer Federation.

=== 2026 U.S. Open Cup ===
In November 2025, SC Vistula Garfield qualified for the 2026 Lamar Hunt U.S. Open Cup through the Open Division qualifying process.

In the final qualifying round, Vistula defeated Oaklyn United FC 2–1 to secure its first Open Cup berth in more than four decades.

The club was drawn against professional side One Knoxville SC of USL League One in the First Round, scheduled for March 18, 2026.

The club lost 3-1 to One Knoxville SC in their first round match, which eliminated them from the competition.

== Club identity ==
SC Vistula Garfield maintains strong ties to the Polish-American community in Garfield, New Jersey. The club name references Poland’s Vistula River, and the organization historically functioned as both a sporting and social institution for Polish immigrants and their descendants.

While rooted in Polish heritage, the club now serves a diverse player base across youth and senior levels.

== Honors ==
=== National competitions ===
- U.S. Open Cup
  - Qualified for tournament proper: 1970s
  - Qualified for tournament proper: 2026

=== Regional competitions ===
- Multiple northern New Jersey amateur league and cup titles (various seasons)
