= Tennessee Tempo FC =

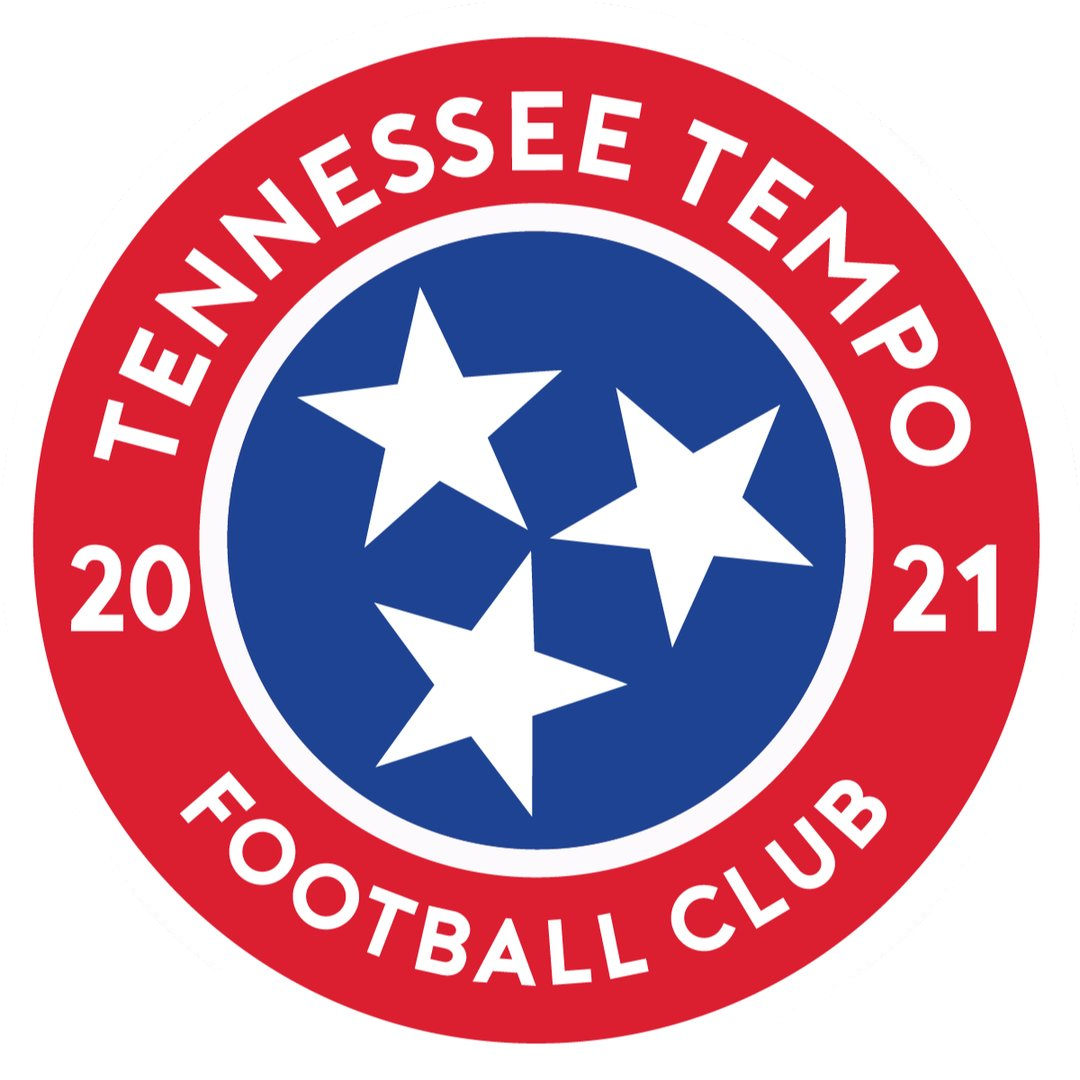
- Full name: Tennessee Tempo Football Club
- Founded: 2021 as Beaman United FC
- Ground: Richard Siegel Soccer Complex, Murfreesboro, Tennessee
- Owners: Gift Ndam; Tamra Simmons
- Manager: Gift Ndam
- Coach: Carianne Bricker (women's head coach)
- League: United Premier Soccer League (men); Women's Premier Soccer League (women)
- Website: https://www.tennesseetempofc.com

Tennessee Tempo FC is an American soccer team based in Murfreesboro, Tennessee. The team was founded in 2021 and plays in the United Premier Soccer League in the Southeast region, with its women's side set to join the Women's Premier Soccer League in 2025.

== History ==
Tennessee Tempo FC began in 2021 under the name Beaman United FC. The club was founded in Murfreesboro, Tennessee, by Gift Ndam and former New York City FC midfielder Kwadwo Poku, who returned to the Nashville area after his professional career. The founders aimed to build an inclusive, development-focused club that could serve the mid-state region, where lower-league teams had struggled to gain a foothold.

In Spring 2022, Beaman United entered the United Premier Soccer League. The team achieved immediate success, finishing top of the Kentucky-Tennessee Conference and reaching the UPSL national final in their debut season. That same summer, the club won the USASA Region III Amateur Cup but was later disqualified after it was discovered that several players retained professional status. In Fall 2022, the club won three U.S. Open Cup qualifying matches and advanced to the 2023 tournament proper, where it lost to Des Moines Menace in the first round.

In June 2023, the organization adopted the name Tennessee Tempo FC after launching its women's program and seeking greater national visibility. During this period, the club expanded its academy, strengthened community engagement, and continued to field strong UPSL sides. The team returned to U.S. Open Cup qualifying in late 2023 but missed out on qualification for the 2024 tournament after a defeat to South Carolina United Heat.

Also in 2024, the Women's Premier Soccer League announced that Tennessee Tempo FC would join the league as an expansion franchise for the 2025 season. Club ownership emphasized a mission centered on player development, inclusion, and expanding opportunities for women in the sport.

In the Spring 2025 UPSL season, Tennessee Tempo delivered their strongest campaign to date. They finished with a 10W-0D-1L record in conference play, scoring 48 goals and conceding seven. The squad included college players, internationals, and former professionals. Seth Poku emerged as a key figure, contributing goals throughout the playoff run. Tempo advanced through the national bracket with three consecutive shutouts, then defeated Chicago Nation FC 2–1 in an extra-time semifinal. On 1 June 2025 in Irvine, California, they beat Alessandro Del Piero's LA 10 FC 1–0 in the national championship match, securing the club's first UPSL national title. The championship also earned Tempo direct entry into the 2026 U.S. Open Cup.
