= 2026 U.S. Open Cup qualification =

2026 Lamar Hunt U.S. Open Cup qualification
Tournament details
- Country: United States
- Dates: September 13 – November 23, 2025
- Teams: 145
- Qualified teams: (Texas) ASC New Stars; (Colorado) Azteca FC; (Florida) Badgers FC; (Missouri) BOHFS St. Louis; (Massachusetts) CD Faialense; (Florida) FC America CFL Spurs; (California) Laguna United FC; (Georgia (U.S. state)) Kalonji Pro-Profile; (New York (state)) NY Renegades FC; (Florida) Red Force FC; (California) San Ramon FC; (New Jersey) SC Vistula Garfield; Southern Indiana FC; (Pennsylvania) Steel City FC; (California) Valley 559 FC; Virginia Dream FC

Tournament statistics
- Matches played: 129
- Goals scored: 529 (4.1 per match)
- All statistics correct as of 15:46, November 24, 2025 (UTC).

The 2026 Lamar Hunt U.S. Open Cup qualification served as local qualification for the 111th edition of the oldest soccer tournament in the United States. The tournament proper will feature both professional and amateur teams in the United States soccer league system.

Qualification for the 2026 tournament included local qualifying matches contested by 145 amateur teams competing for 16 local qualifying slots, and took place in 2025. United Premier Soccer League has the highest representation with 66 teams entering the tournament. Three teams have already qualified, West Chester United SC by winning the 2025 National Amateur Cup, Tennessee Tempo FC by winning the 2025 United Premier Soccer League Spring Championships, and the 2025 John Motta Trophy Winner El Farolito SC, the Open Division Prize Winner from the 2025 tournament.

== Qualification procedure ==
Clubs based in the United States that play in a league that is an organization member of U.S. Soccer are generally eligible to compete for the U.S. Open Cup, so long as their league includes at least four teams and has a schedule of at least 10 matches for each club. To be eligible, teams must be members in good standing of their leagues on December 31, 2025, and remain so through the 2026 final. Any team that started its first season of competition in an existing league must have started its new league's schedule no later 30 days prior to the Open Division Entry Deadline.

Starting in 2019, the winner of the previous year's National Amateur Cup automatically qualifies for the U.S. Open Cup. The cup winner enters the tournament proper in the first round with the other local qualifiers. Beginning in 2024, the United Premier Soccer League Spring Champion also earned a direct entry into the first round proper of the tournament. Starting in 2025, the Open-Division team that performed the best in the previous tournament are awarded the John Motta Trophy and granted direct access into the tournament proper. These three teams along with the 16 local qualifiers account for 19 of the 32 amateur teams that qualify for the tournament proper in 2025. The other 13 teams come from the National Premier Soccer League and USL League Two. Four teams from National Premier Soccer League and nine teams from USL League Two qualify through national league pathways, which use previous summer season standings to determine teams that qualify.

== Amateur qualification ==
=== National Amateur Cup ===
West Chester United SC defeated RWB Adria 4–3 in extra time, to win the 2025 National Amateur Cup and qualify for the 2026 U.S. Open Cup.

=== United Premier Soccer League Spring Champions ===
Tennessee Tempo FC defeated LA 10 FC 1–0, to win the 2025 UPSL Spring Championships and earning a direct qualification into the 2026 U.S. Open Cup.

=== John Motta Trophy winner ===
El Farolito SC advanced the furthest in the 2025 U.S. Open Cup, earning both the $50,000 bonus and the John Motta Trophy. Based on their performance in the previous tournament, El Farolito qualifies directly into the 2026 U.S. Open Cup.

=== Local qualifying ===
U.S. Soccer originally announced that 146 teams would participate in local qualifying. Four rounds of local qualifying matches will result in 16 clubs advancing to the tournament proper. The teams will be organized into 16 regional pools prior to the qualifying round draw.

==== Schedule ====
Schedule for 2025 Lamar Hunt U.S. Open Cup Qualifying
Round	Match day	New Teams	Entrants	Teams entered to date
First Qualifying Round	September 13 & 14	44	44	44
Second Qualifying Round	October 11 & 12	96	118	140
Third Qualifying Round	November 1 & 2	5	64	145
Fourth Qualifying Round	November 22 & 23	0	32	145

==== Number of teams by state and league ====
A total of 29 states and the District of Columbia are represented by clubs in the U.S. Open Cup Qualification this year.

	States	Number	League	Teams
1	Florida	13	United Premier Soccer League	America CFL Spurs, Badgers FC, Bold City SC, City Soccer FC, Deportivo Lake Mary FC, Emerald FC Orlando, FC Kanks, Florida Futbol Club, Harbor City FC, Miami United FC, Palm Beach Flames SC, Parkland Travel Soccer Club, Stetson FA
1	Florida	4	Soccer Premier League	Atletico Miami Internacional FC, Boca Jrs Miami FC, Fort Myers City FC, River Miami FC
1	Florida	3	United States Soccer League	Hurricane FC, Miami Soccer Academy, O’Shea's FC
1	Florida	1	Florida Suncoast Soccer League	Pinellas County United Pelicans SC
1	Florida	1	National Premier Soccer League	FC Florida
1	Florida	1	Premier Futbol League	Red Force FC
2	California	12	United Premier Soccer League	Apple Valley Storm, Ariana FC, Bay Area United FC, City SC San Diego, Eclipse Soccer Academy, FC Balboa, FC Folsom, Irvine FC, Laguna United FC, Rebels SC, San Diego Internacional, Valley 559 FC
2	California	4	San Francisco Soccer Football League	International San Francisco, Norcal Shockwaves FC, SF Vikings SC, The Olympic Club
2	California	4	The League for Clubs	Albion SC Silicon Valley, CF San Rafael, Napa Valley 1839 FC, San Ramon FC
2	California	1	National Premier Soccer League	Real San Jose
2	California	1	Southwest Premier League	Dublin Celtic FC
3	New York	6	American Premier Soccer League	Central Park Rangers FC, Doxa SC, Lansdowne Yonkers FC, New York Greek American SC, New York Pancyprian-Freedoms, Zum Schneider FC
3	New York	2	National Premier Soccer League	American Soccer Club New York, Osner's FC
3	New York	2	United Premier Soccer League	FCY New York, NY Renegades FC
3	New York	1	The League for Clubs	Metropolitan Oval Academy
4	Texas	4	United Premier Soccer League	210 FC, Foro SC, Sporting NTX, SVD Beaumont
4	Texas	2	Dallas Soccer Alliance	Master Joga, StrikerZ DFW Soccer Club
4	Texas	2	Metroplex Premier League	Dallas Atletico, Denton Diablos FC
4	Texas	1	Houston Football Association	ASC New Stars
5	New Jersey	3	America Premier Soccer League	Oaklyn United FC, Real Central NJ Soccer, SC Vistula Garfield
5	New Jersey	3	United Premier Soccer League	Bulldogs SC, Ironbound SCP, New Jersey Alliance FC
5	New Jersey	1	Garden State Soccer League	Scots-American Athletic Club
5	New Jersey	1	The League for Clubs	FC Monmouth
6	Maryland	2	America Premier Soccer League	Christos FC, Patuxent FA
6	Maryland	2	United Premier Soccer League	MoCo 1776 FC, MSI Pro
6	Maryland	1	DC Premier League	Oranje FC
6	Maryland	1	Maryland Super Soccer League	Baltimore City F.C.
6	Maryland	1	National Premier Soccer League	DMV Elite FC
6	Georgia	5	United Premier Soccer League	Atletico Buford FC, Kalonji Pro-Profile, Limeño Georgia, North Georgia United, Potros FC
6	Georgia	1	America Premier Soccer League	Majestic SC
6	Georgia	1	Atlanta District Amateur Soccer League	Terminus FC
6	Virginia	4	United Premier Soccer League	Alexandria Reds, Arlington SA Pro, Doradus FC, Virginia Dream FC
6	Virginia	2	American Premier League	Aegean Hawks, Yinz United
6	Virginia	1	National Premier Soccer League	Grove United F.C.
9	Colorado	5	Colorado Premier League	Azteca FC, Boulder United FC, Colorado Rovers, FC Denver, Harpos FC
9	Colorado	1	Mountain Premier League	Peak Eleven FC
9	Illinois	4	United Premier Soccer League	Black Cat FC, Chicago Strikers, United SC, Wisloka Chicago
9	Illinois	2	Midwest Premier League	Chicago House AC, Edgewater Castle FC
9	Massachusetts	3	Bay State Soccer League	Atletico Boston, CD Faialense, FC Omens
9	Massachusetts	1	America Premier Soccer League	Project Football
9	Massachusetts	1	United Premier Soccer League	Brockton FC United
9	Massachusetts	1	USL League Two	Western Mass Pioneers
9	Pennsylvania	2	United Soccer League of Pennsylvania	Colonial SC, Vereinigung Erzgebirge
9	Pennsylvania	1	America Premier Soccer League	Vidas United FC
9	Pennsylvania	1	National Premier Soccer League	Philadelphia Ukrainians Nationals
9	Pennsylvania	1	United Premier Soccer League	Capital City Islanders
9	Pennsylvania	1	USL League Two	Steel City FC
13	North Carolina	2	United Premier Soccer League	Briar United FC, Mint Hill FC
13	North Carolina	1	National Premier Soccer League	Greenville United Football Club
13	Ohio	1	North Coast Soccer League	Croatia Cleveland
13	Ohio	1	National Premier Soccer League	Cleveland SC
13	Ohio	1	USL League Two	Akron City FC
13	Washington	1	Seattle Recreational Adult Team Soccer	Sharktopus Football Club
13	Washington	1	United Premier Soccer League	Bellevue Athletic FC
13	Washington	1	USL League Two	Ballard FC
16	Arizona	2	United Premier Soccer League	Next Level Soccer, Olympians FC
16	Indiana	2	United Premier Soccer League	Southern Indiana FC, Southern Indiana Guardians FC
16	Oklahoma	1	The League for Clubs	Tulsa Athletic
16	Oklahoma	1	United Premier Soccer League	FC Bartlesville Buffaloes
19	District of Columbia	1	DC Premier League	Guerrilla FC
19	Iowa	1	National Premier Soccer League	Iowa Demon Hawks
19	Kansas	1	The Select League	Woodland Football Club
19	Kentucky	1	Ohio Valley Premier League	Bootleggers AC
19	Michigan	1	United Premier Soccer League	Detroit Metro FC
19	Mississippi	1	United Premier Soccer League	Eagles Sports Southaven F.C.
19	Missouri	1	Midwest Premier League	BOHFS St. Louis
19	Nebraska	1	United Premier Soccer League	Omaha Street FC
19	New Hampshire	1	United Premier Soccer League	FC Lonestar Gpse
19	New Mexico	1	United Premier Soccer League	UDA Soccer
19	South Carolina	1	United Premier Soccer League	SCU Heat
19	Tennessee	1	United Premier Soccer League	Tennessee United Soccer Club

== First Qualifying Round ==
The first qualifying round matches were held on September 13 & 14, 2025. 101 clubs got first qualifying round byes.

September 13, 2025	Black Cat FC (UPSL) (Illinois)	1–2	(Illinois) Edgewater Castle FC (MPL)	Bensenville, Illinois
5:00 pm CDT	Yumange 33'		Alami 21'; Vucic 71'	Stadium: Redmond Recreational Complex

September 13, 2025	Southern Indiana Guardians FC (UPSL) (Indiana)	0–10	Southern Indiana FC (UPSL)	Jeffersonville, Indiana
7:00 pm EDT	GK (red card) 54'	Report	5'; 12'; McClosky 39'; Clegg 44', 45'; Brown 50', 71'; E. McCloud 66'; J. McCloud 77'; Mohamed 85'	Stadium: Woehrle Athletic Complex

September 13, 2025	Philadelphia Ukrainian Nationals (NPSL) (Pennsylvania)	0–3	(Pennsylvania) Colonial SC (USLPA)	North Wales, Pennsylvania
7:30 pm EDT		Report	Underwood 20', 34'; Whitman 60'	Stadium: Ukrainian American Sports Center

September 13, 2025	Tulsa Athletic (TLC) (Oklahoma)	6–0	(Oklahoma) FC Bartlesville Buffaloes (UPSL)	Tulsa, Oklahoma
7:00 pm CDT	Diaz 12'; Diallo 45+3'; Geris-Rey 66'; Harris 81'; Ruiz 85'; Nino 90+2'	Report		Stadium: Athletic Community Field

September 13, 2025	Chicago Strikers (UPSL) (Illinois)	0–3	(Illinois) Wisloka Chicago (UPSL)	Glen Ellyn, Illinois
7:30 pm CDT		Report	Kielar 42'; Melnyk 57'; 83'	Stadium: College of DuPage

September 13, 2025	Eclipse Soccer Academy (UPSL) (California)	1–7	(California) Albion SC Silicon Valley (UPSL)	Santa Cruz, California
6:00 pm PDT	Homer 76'	Report	Hernandez 3'; Tafolla 9'; Lincona 35', 69', 75'; Orozco 60'; Romero	Stadium: Santa Cruz High School

September 13, 2025	Napa Valley 1839 FC (TLC) (California)	5–1	(California) SF Vikings SC (SFSFL)	Napa, California
7:00 pm PDT	Pavon 28'; Vega 35', 45'; Ortiz 50'; Vivan 85'	Report	79'	Stadium: Justin-Siena High School

September 14, 2025	Vidas United FC (APSL) (Pennsylvania)	1–2	(Pennsylvania) Vereinigung Erzgebirge (USLPA)	Philadelphia, Pennsylvania
1:00 pm EDT		Report		Stadium: John Bartram High School

September 14, 2025	Patuxent FA (APSL) (Maryland)	0–8	(Maryland) Christos FC (APSL)	Upper Marlboro, Maryland
2:00 pm EDT		Report		Stadium: Liberty Sports Park

September 14, 2025	The Olympic Club (SFSFL) (California)	4–2	(California) Norcal Shockwaves (SFSFL)	San Francisco, California
2:00 pm PDT		Report		Stadium: Negoesco Stadium

September 14, 2025	Boulder United FC (CPL) (Colorado)	4–0	(Colorado) Colorado Rovers S.C. (CPL)	Broomfield, Colorado
3:00 pm MDT		Report		Stadium: Broomfield Commons

September 14, 2025	Oranje FC (DCPL) (Maryland)	0–3	(Virginia) Doradus FC (UPSL)	Washington, D.C.
6:00 pm EDT		Report		Stadium: The Fields at RFK Campus - Field 3

September 14, 2025	Denton Diablos FC (MPL) (Texas)	6–2	(Texas) Sporting NTX (UPSL)	Ft. Worth, Texas
5:15 pm CDT		Report		Stadium: Alliance Park - Field 2

September 14, 2025	Scots-American Athletic Club (GSSL) (New Jersey)	3–1	(New Jersey) Real Central New Jersey (APSL)	Kearny, New Jersey
7:30 pm EDT		Report		Stadium: Kearny High School

September 14, 2025	Foro SC (UPSL) (Texas)	1–3	(Texas) Dallas Atletico (MPL)	Dallas, Texas
7:00 pm CDT		Report		Stadium: Bishop Lynch High School

September 14, 2025	Aegean Hawks (APSL) (Virginia)	1–3	(Virginia) Arlington SA Pro (UPSL)	McLean, Virginia
8:00 pm EDT		Report		Stadium: Langley High School

September 14, 2025	DOXA SC (APSL) (New York (state))	1–0	(New Jersey) New Jersey Alliance FC (UPSL)	New Rochelle, New York
8:00 pm EDT		Report		Stadium: Flowers Park

September 14, 2025	NY Renegades FC (UPSL) (New York (state))	2–1	(New York (state)) American Soccer Club New York (NPSL)	Central Islip, New York
8:00 pm EDT		Report		Stadium: SUSA Orlin & Cohen Sports Complex - Field 2

September 14, 2025	Peak Eleven FC (MPL) (Colorado)	3–2 (a.e.t.)	(Colorado) FC Denver (CPL)	Thornton, Colorado
6:00 pm MDT		Report		Stadium: Pinnacle Athletic Complex

September 14, 2025	Terminus FC (ADASL) (Georgia (U.S. state))	0–1	(Georgia (U.S. state)) Majestic SC (APSL)	Dunwoody, Georgia
8:00 pm EDT		Report		Stadium: Brook Run Soccer Fields
Note: Match was stopped in 73' when the lights at the host field turned off.

September 14, 2025	Yinz United (APSL) (Virginia)	1–2	(Maryland) MSI Pro (UPSL)	Vienna, Virginia
8:00 pm EDT		Report		Stadium: Oakton High School

September 14, 2025	NY Greek American SC (APSL) (New York (state))	2–0	(New York (state)) New York Pancyprian-Freedoms (APSL)	Hempstead, New York
9:00 pm EDT		Report		Stadium: James M. Shuart Stadium

- Byes: 210 FC, Akron City FC, Alexandria Reds, Apple Valley Storm, Ariana FC, ASC New Stars, Atletico Boston, Atletico Buford FC, Atletico Miami Internacional FC, Azteca FC, Badgers FC, Ballard FC, Baltimore City F.C., Bay Area United FC, Bellevue Athletic FC, Boca Jrs Miami FC, BOHFS St. Louis, Bold City SC, Bootleggers AC, Briar United FC, Brockton FC United, Bulldogs SC, Capital City Islanders, CD Faialense, Central Park Rangers FC, CF San Rafael, Chicago House AC, City SC San Diego, City Soccer FC, Cleveland SC, Croatia Cleveland, Deportivo Lake Mary FC, Detroit Metro FC, DMV Elite FC, Dublin Celtic FC, Eagles Sports Southaven F.C., Emerald FC Orlando, FC America CFL Spurs, FC Balboa, FC Florida, FC Folsom, FC Kanks, FC Lonestar Gpse, FC Monmouth, FC Omens FCY New York, Florida Futbol Club, Fort Myers City FC, Greenville United Football Club, Grove United, Guerrilla FC, Harbor City FC, Harpos FC, Hurricane FC, International San Francisco, Iowa Demon Hawks, Ironbound SCP, Irvine FC, Kalonji Pro-Profile, Laguna United FC, Lansdowne Yonkers FC, Limeno Georgia, Master Joga, Metropolitan Oval Academyy, Miami Soccer Academy, Miami United FC, Mint Hill FC, MoCo 1776 FC, Next Level Soccer, North Georgia United, Oaklyn United FC, Olympians FC, Omaha Street FC, O’Shea's FC, Osner's FC, Palm Beach Flames SC, Parkland Travel Soccer Club, Pinellas County United Pelicans SC, Potros FC, Project Football, Real San Jose, Rebels SC, Red Force, River Miami FC, San Diego Internacional, San Ramon FC, SC Vistula Garfield, SCU Heat, Sharktopus Football Club, Steel City FC, Stetson FC, StrikerZ DFW Soccer Club, SVD Beaumont, Tennessee United Soccer Club, UDA Soccer, United SC, Valley 559 FC, Virginia Dream FC, Western Mass Pioneers, Woodland Football Club, Zum Schneider FC

== Second Qualifying Round ==
The second qualifying round matches took place October 10–14, 2025. 5 clubs got second qualifying round byes.

October 10, 2025	Western Mass Pioneers (USL2) (Massachusetts)	1–4	(Massachusetts) Atletico Boston (BSSL)	Ludlow, Massachusetts
7:00 pm EDT		Report		Stadium: Lusitano Stadium

October 11, 2025	Vereinigung Erzgebirge (USLPA) (Pennsylvania)	2–1	(Pennsylvania) Colonial SC (USLPA)	Warminster, Pennsylvania
2:30 pm EDT		Report		Stadium: Vereinigung Erzgebirge Clubhouse

October 11, 2025	Mint Hill FC (UPSL) (North Carolina)	3–2	(South Carolina) SCU Heat (UPSL)	Mint Hill, North Carolina
3:00 pm EDT		Report		Stadium: Mint Hill Veterans Memorial Park

October 11, 2025	Baltimore City F.C. (MSSL) (Maryland)	2–5	(Maryland) Christos FC (APSL)	Glen Burnie, Maryland
3:00 pm EDT		Report		Stadium: North County High School

October 11, 2025	Parkland Travel SC (UPSL) (Florida)	0–3	Florida Futbol Club (UPSL)	Parkland, Florida
5:00 pm EDT		Report		Stadium: Terramar Park

October 11, 2025	CD Faialense (BSSL) (Massachusetts)	5–0	(Massachusetts) Project Football (APSL)	Winthrop, Massachusetts
6:00 pm EDT		Report		Stadium: Miller Field

October 11, 2025	ASC New Stars (HFA) (Texas)	3–0	(Texas) SVD Beaumont (UPSL)	Houston, Texas
6:00 pm CDT		Report		Stadium: Bayland Park

October 11, 2025	Briar United FC (UPSL) (North Carolina)	2–1	(North Carolina) Greenville United FC (NPSL)	Apex, North Carolina
7:00 pm EDT		Report		Stadium: Pleasant Park

October 11, 2025	Capital City Islanders (UPSL) (Pennsylvania)	5–2	(Maryland) MoCo 1776 FC (UPSL)	Harrisburg, Pennsylvania
7:00 pm EDT		Report		Stadium: Skyline Sports Complex

October 11, 2025	FC Monmouth (TLC) (New Jersey)	1–3	(New Jersey) Bulldogs SC (UPSL)	Red Bank, New Jersey
7:00 pm EDT		Report		Stadium: Count Basie Park

October 11, 2025	SC Vistula Garfield (APSL) (New Jersey)	2–1	(New Jersey) Ironbound SCP (UPSL)	Garfield, New Jersey
7:00 pm EDT		Report		Stadium: Garfield High School

October 11, 2025	Bold City SC (UPSL) (Florida)	1–0	(Florida) Stetson FA (UPSL)	Jacksonville, Florida
7:30 pm EDT		Report		Stadium: Fort Family Park

October 11, 2025	Dallas Atletico (MPPL) (Texas)	3–1	(Texas) StrikerZ DFW SC (DSA)	McKinney, Texas
7:00 pm CDT		Report		Stadium: Ron Poe Stadium

October 11, 2025	Fort Myers City FC (SPL) (Florida)	0–1	(Florida) Badgers FC (UPSL)	Punta Gorda, Florida
8:00 pm EDT		Report		Stadium: Babcock Ranch

October 11, 2025	Tulsa Athletic (TLC) (Oklahoma)	4–5 (a.e.t.)	(Texas) Denton Diablos (MPPL)	Tulsa, Oklahoma
6:00 pm CDT		Report		Stadium: Athletic Community Field

October 11, 2025	Woodland FC (TLS) (Kansas)	1–3	(Missouri) BOHFS St. Louis (MWPL)	Overland Park, Kansas
6:00 pm CDT		Report		Stadium: Shawnee Mission District Stadium

October 11, 2025	Grove United (NPSL) (Virginia)	4–2	(Virginia) Alexandria Reds (UPSL)	Glen Allen, Virginia
7:30 pm EDT		Report		Stadium: Glover Park

October 11, 2025	Deportivo Lake Mary FC (UPSL) (Florida)	0–1	(Florida) Emerald FC Orlando (UPSL)	Lake Mary, Florida
8:00 pm EDT		Report		Stadium: Lake Mary High School

October 11, 2025	MSI Pro (UPSL) (Maryland)	1–0	(Virginia) Arlington SA Pro (UPSL)	Silver Spring, Maryland
8:30 pm EDT		Report		Stadium: Blair High School

October 11, 2025	FC Kanks (UPSL) (Florida)	0–3	(Florida) Harbor City FC (UPSL)	Orlando, Florida
8:45 pm EDT		Report		Stadium: XL Soccer World

October 11, 2025	United SC (UPSL) (Illinois)	1–2	(Illinois) Edgewater Castle FC (MWPL)	Chicago, Illinois
8:30 pm CDT		Report		Stadium: Lions For Hope Sports Complex

October 11, 2025	Napa Valley 1839 FC (TLC) (California)	1–3	(California) FC Folsom (UPSL)	Napa, California
7:00 pm PDT		Report		Stadium: Justin-Siena High School

October 11, 2025	Next Level Soccer (UPSL) (Arizona)	3–1	(Arizona) Olympians FC (UPSL)	Gilbert, Arizona
8:00 pm MDT		Report		Stadium: Higley High School

October 11, 2025	Valley 559 FC (UPSL) (California)	2–1	(California) Real San Jose (NPSL)	Fresno, California
7:00 pm PDT		Report		Stadium: Keith Tice Park

October 12, 2025	Steel City FC (USL2) (Pennsylvania)	3–2	(New York (state)) FCY New York (UPSL)	Cheswick, Pennsylvania
3:00 pm EDT		Report		Stadium: Founders Field

October 12, 2025	Cleveland SC (NPSL) (Ohio)	0–2	(Ohio) Akron City FC (USL2)	North Olmsted, Ohio
4:00 pm EDT		Report		Stadium: North Olmsted Stadium Complex

October 12, 2025	Majestic SC (APSL) (Georgia (U.S. state))	0–2	(Georgia (U.S. state)) Atletico Buford FC (UPSL)	Decatur, Georgia
4:00 pm EDT		Report		Stadium: Ebster Park Soccer Field

October 12, 2025	Harpos FC (CPL) (Colorado)	3–0	(Colorado) Boulder United FC (CPL)	Broomfield, Colorado
1:30 pm MDT		Report		Stadium: Broomfield Commons

October 12, 2025	Croatia Cleveland (NCSL) (Ohio)	5–2	(Michigan) Detroit Metro FC (UPSL)	Mentor, Ohio
5:00 pm EDT		Report		Stadium: Mentor High School

October 12, 2025	Boca Jrs Miami FC (SPL) (Florida)	0–3	(Florida) Miami United FC (UPSL)	Hialeah, Florida
5:00 pm EDT		Report		Stadium: Ted Hendricks Stadium

October 12, 2025	Southern Indiana FC (UPSL)	4–1	(Kentucky) Bootleggers AC (OVPL)	New Albany, Indiana
4:00 pm CDT		Report		Stadium: Green Valley Soccer Complex

October 12, 2025	Doradus FC (UPSL) (Virginia)	1–2	Virginia Dream FC (UPSL)	Springfield, Virginia
6:00 pm EDT		Report		Stadium: West Springfield High School

October 12, 2025	FC Lonestar Gpse (UPSL) (Massachusetts)	2–1 (a.e.t.)	(Massachusetts) FC Omens (BSSL)	Lawrence, Massachusetts
6:00 pm EDT		Report		Stadium: Veterans Memorial Stadium

October 12, 2025	Guerrilla FC (DCPL) (Washington, D.C.)	1-1 (a.e.t.) (4-2 SO)	(Maryland) DMV Elite FC (NPSL)	Washington, D.C.
6:00 pm EDT		Report		Stadium: The Fields at RFK

October 12, 2025	Miami Soccer Academy (USSL) (Florida)	3–0	(Florida) River Miami FC (SPL)	Miami, Florida
6:00 pm EDT		Report		Stadium: Gibson Park

October 12, 2025	Oaklyn United FC (APSL) (New Jersey)	2–0	(New Jersey) Scots-American AC (GSSL)	Glassboro, New Jersey
6:00 pm EDT		Report		Stadium: Rowan University Soccer Stadium

October 12, 2025	Omaha Street FC (UPSL) (Nebraska)	W–L forfeit	(Iowa) Iowa Demon Hawks (NPSL)	Omaha, Nebraska
4:00 pm CDT		Report		Stadium: Blackburn High School

October 12, 2025	Pinellas County United Pelicans SC (FSSL) (Florida)	1–3 (a.e.t.)	(Florida) FC America CFL Spurs (UPSL)	St. Petersburg, Florida
6:00 pm EDT		Report		Stadium: Walter Fuller Park

October 12, 2025	Kalonji Pro-Profile (UPSL) (Georgia (U.S. state))	4–2	(Georgia (U.S. state)) Limeno Georgia (UPSL)	Snellville, Georgia
7:00 pm EDT		Report		Stadium: Shiloh High School

October 12, 2025	Metropolitan Oval Academy (TLC) (New York (state))	W–L forfeit	(New York (state)) Central Park Rangers FC (APSL)	Maspeth, New York
7:00 pm EDT		Report		Stadium: Metropolitan Oval

October 12, 2025	North Georgia United (UPSL) (Georgia (U.S. state))	0–2	(Georgia (U.S. state)) Potros FC (UPSL)	Dalton, Georgia
7:00 pm EDT		Report		Stadium: Riverbend Park

October 12, 2025	Zum Schneider FC (APSL) (New York (state))	7–3	(New York (state)) Osner’s FC (NPSL)	New York, New York
7:00 pm EDT		Report		Stadium: Jack McManus Field

October 12, 2025	Peak XI FC (MTPL) (Colorado)	1–2 (a.e.t.)	(Colorado) Azteca FC (CPL)
5:00 pm MDT		Report

October 12, 2025	FC Balboa (UPSL) (California)	1–7	(California) San Diego Internacional (UPSL)	San Diego, California
4:30 pm PDT		Report		Stadium: Logan Memorial Education Campus

October 12, 2025	Hurricane FC (USSL) (Florida)	1–6	(Florida) Palm Beach Flames SC (UPSL)	Delray Beach, Florida
7:30 pm EDT		Report		Stadium: Seacrest Soccer Complex

October 12, 2025	Chicago House AC (MWPL) (Illinois)	2–0	(Illinois) Wisloka Chicago (UPSL)	Lisle, Illinois
7:00 pm CDT		Report		Stadium: Benedictine University

October 12, 2025	Tennessee United SC (UPSL)	2–0	(Mississippi) Eagles Sports Southaven FC (UPSL)	Gallatin, Tennessee
7:00 pm CDT		Report		Stadium: Station Camp HS Soccer Field

October 12, 2025	DOXA SC (APSL) (New York (state))	1–2	(New York (state)) Lansdowne Yonkers FC (APSL)	New Rochelle, New York
8:00 pm EDT		Report		Stadium: Flowers Park
Note: DOXA SC protested match, but USSF denied the protest

October 12, 2025	New York Greek American SC (APSL) (New York (state))	2–3	(New York (state)) NY Renegades FC (UPSL)	Hempstead, New York
8:00 pm EDT		Report		Stadium: Hofstra Stadium

October 12, 2025	Albion SC Silicon Valley (TLC) (California)	0–1	(California) The Olympic Club (SFSFL)	San Francisco, California
5:00 pm PDT		Report		Stadium: Negoesco Stadium

October 12, 2025	210 FC (UPSL) (Texas)	6–2	(Texas) Master Joga (DSA)	San Antonio, Texas
7:30 pm CDT		Report		Stadium: STAR Soccer Complex

October 12, 2025	Atletico Miami Internacional FC (SPL) (Florida)	3–4 (a.e.t.)	(Florida) Red Force FC (PFL)	Miami, Florida
8:30 pm EDT		Report		Stadium: Kendall Soccer Park

October 12, 2025	City SC San Diego (UPSL) (California)	9–0	(California) Rebels SC (UPSL)	Carlsbad, California
6:00 pm PDT		Report		Stadium: Aviara Community Park

October 12, 2025	Sharktopus FC (SRATS) (Washington (state))	3–4 (a.e.t.)	(Washington (state)) Bellevue Athletic FC (UPSL)	Seattle, Washington
6:30 pm PDT		Report		Stadium: Jefferson Playfield
Note: Sharktopus protested because referee was member of Bellevue Athletic FC 2. USSF ruled to replay match.

October 12, 2025	International San Francisco (SFSFL) (California)	3–2	(California) CF San Rafael (TLC)	San Francisco, California
7:00 pm PDT		Report		Stadium: James P. Lang Soccer Field

October 12, 2025	Irvine FC (UPSL) (California)	3–3 (a.e.t.) (4–3 SO)	(California) Apple Valley Storm (UPSL)	Lake Forest, California
7:00 pm PDT		Report		Stadium: Lake Forest Sports Park

October 12, 2025	San Ramon FC (TLC) (California)	6–0	(California) Dublin Celtic FC (SWPL)	San Ramon, California
7:30 pm PDT		Report		Stadium: Tiffany Roberts Field

October 12, 2025	Ariana FC (UPSL) (California)	2–1 (a.e.t.)	(California) Bay Area United FC (UPSL)	Livermore, California
8:00 pm PDT		Report		Stadium: Cayetano Park

October 14, 2025	O’Shea’s FC (USSL) (Florida)	2–1	(Florida) FC Florida (NPSL)	West Palm Beach, Florida
7:00 pm EDT				Stadium: Gaines Park

- Byes: Ballard FC, Brockton FC United, City Soccer FC, Laguna United FC, UDA Soccer

=== Re-play ===
Replay was ordered by USSF after Sharktopus successfully protested the first match after discovering the referee was a member of the Bellevue Athletic organization.

October 28, 2025	Sharktopus FC (SRATS) (Washington (state))	5–0	(Washington (state)) Bellevue Athletic FC (UPSL)	Redmond, Washington
8:00 pm PDT		Report		Stadium: Athletic Marymoor Park (Field 1)

== Third Qualifying Round ==
The fifty-nine second round winners and five teams that received second round byes played the third qualifying round November 1-2.

November 1, 2025	Akron City FC (USL2) (Ohio)	3–3 (a.e.t.) (4–5 SO)	(Ohio) Croatia Cleveland (NCSL)	Akron, Ohio
3:00 pm EDT		Report		Stadium: St. Vincent–St. Mary High School

November 1, 2025	Ballard FC (USL2) (Washington (state))	5–1	(Washington (state)) Sharktopus FC (SRATS)	Seattle, Washington
12:00 pm PDT		Report		Stadium: Interbay Stadium

November 1, 2025	Brockton FC United (UPSL) (Massachusetts)	0–1 (a.e.t.)	(Massachusetts) CD Faialense (BSSL)	Boston, Massachusetts
6:00 pm EDT		Report		Stadium: Roberts Playground

November 1, 2025	Briar United FC (UPSL) (North Carolina)	1–1 (a.e.t.) (5–4 SO)	(Virginia) Grove United (NPSL)	Apex, North Carolina
7:00 pm EDT		Report		Stadium: Pleasant Park

November 1, 2025	Harbor City FC (UPSL) (Florida)	3–2 (a.e.t.)	(Florida) Bold City SC (UPSL)	Melbourne, Florida
7:00 pm EDT		Report		Stadium: Palm Bay Magnet High School

November 1, 2025	MSI Pro (UPSL) (Maryland)	5–0	(Maryland) Christos FC (APSL)	Boyds, Maryland
7:00 pm EDT		Report		Stadium: Maryland SoccerPlex

November 1, 2025	NY Renegades FC (UPSL) (New York (state))	5–3 (a.e.t.)	(New York (state)) Lansdowne Yonkers FC (APSL)	Central Islip, New York
7:45 pm EDT		Report		Stadium: SUSA Orlin & Cohen Sports Complex

November 1, 2025	Palm Beach Flames SC (UPSL) (Florida)	3–4 (a.e.t.)	(Florida) City Soccer FC (UPSL)	Lake Worth Beach, Florida
7:45 pm EDT		Report		Stadium: Dr. Joaquín García High School

November 1, 2025	Dallas Atletico (MPPL) (Texas)	1–2	(Texas) Denton Diablos (MPPL)	Dallas, Texas
7:00 pm CDT		Report		Stadium: Bishop Lynch High School

November 1, 2025	Irvine FC (UPSL) (California)	0–4	(California) Laguna United FC (UPSL)	Lake Forest, California
5:00 pm PDT		Report		Stadium: Lake Forest Sports Park

November 1, 2025	Next Level Soccer (UPSL) (Arizona)	7–0	(New Mexico) UDA Soccer (UPSL)	Gilbert, Arizona
7:00 pm MDT		Report		Stadium: Higley High School

November 1, 2025	Valley 559 FC (UPSL) (California)	5–2	(California) FC Folsom (UPSL)	Fresno, California
7:00 pm PDT		Report		Stadium: Keith Tice Park

November 1, 2025	San Diego Internacional (UPSL) (California)	2–1	(California) City SC San Diego (UPSL)	San Diego, California
8:00 pm PDT		Report		Stadium: Mission Bay High School

November 2, 2025	Steel City FC (USL2) (Pennsylvania)	1-0	(Pennsylvania) Capital City Islanders (UPSL)	Pittsburgh, Pennsylvania
3:00 pm EST	Paulino 49'	Report		Stadium: Arthur J. Rooney Athletic Field

November 2, 2025	Harpos FC (CPL) (Colorado)	1-0	(Colorado) Azteca FC (CPL)	Broomfield, Colorado
12:00 pm MST		Report		Stadium: Broomfield Commons

November 2, 2025	Miami United FC (UPSL) (Florida)	1-1 (a.e.t.) (4-3 p)	(Florida) Florida Futbol Club (UPSL)	Miami, Florida
5:00 pm EST		Report		Stadium: Oak Grove Park

November 2, 2025	Potros FC (UPSL) (Georgia (U.S. state))	2-1	(Georgia (U.S. state)) Atletico Buford FC (UPSL)	Marietta, Georgia
5:00 pm EST	Lima 25' Dadynho 86'	Report		Stadium: Marietta High School

November 2, 2025	The Olympic Club (SFSFL) (California)	4-1	(California) Ariana FC (UPSL)	San Francisco, California
2:30 pm PST		Report		Stadium: San Francisco Glens Stadium

November 2, 2025	Chicago House AC (MWPL) (Illinois)	3-0	(Illinois) Edgewater Castle FC (MWPL)	Lisle, Illinois
5:00 pm CST		Report		Stadium: Benedictine University

November 2, 2025	Oaklyn United FC (APSL) (New Jersey)	3-1	(Pennsylvania) Vereinigung Erzgebirge (USLPA)	Glassboro, New Jersey
6:00 pm EST		Report		Stadium: Rowan University Soccer Stadium

November 2, 2025	Atletico Boston (BSSL) (Massachusetts)	2–2 (a.e.t.) (4–5 SO)	(Massachusetts) FC Lonestar Gpse (UPSL)	Boston, Massachusetts
7:00 pm EST				Stadium: Moakley Stadium

November 2, 2025	Badgers FC (UPSL) (Florida)	5–0	(Florida) O’Shea’s FC (USSL)	Miami Gardens, Florida
7:00 pm EST				Stadium: Monsignor Edward Pace High School

November 2, 2025	Bulldogs SC (UPSL) (New Jersey)	0–1	(New Jersey) SC Vistula Garfield (APSL)	Tinton Falls, New Jersey
7:00 pm EST		Report		Stadium: Capelli Sports Complex

November 2, 2025	Emerald FC Orlando (UPSL) (Florida)	0–7	(Florida) FC America CFL Spurs (UPSL)	Orlando, Florida
7:00 pm EST		Report		Stadium: SoFive Winter Park

November 2, 2025	Kalonji Pro-Profile (UPSL) (Georgia (U.S. state))	4–0	(North Carolina) Mint Hill FC (UPSL)	Snellville, Georgia
7:00 pm EST		Report		Stadium: Shiloh High School

November 2, 2025	Tennessee United SC (UPSL) (Tennessee)	0–1	Southern Indiana FC (UPSL)	Gallatin, Tennessee
6:00 pm CST		Report		Stadium: Station Camp HS Soccer Field

November 2, 2025	Zum Schneider FC (APSL) (New York (state))	4–1	(New York (state)) Metropolitan Oval Academy (TLC)	New York, New York
7:00 pm EST		Report		Stadium: Jack McManus Field

November 2, 2025	Miami Soccer Academy (USSL) (Florida)	1–2	(Florida) Red Force FC (PFL)	Miami Gardens, Florida
7:00 pm EST				Stadium: Monsignor Edward Pace High School

November 2, 2025	210 FC (UPSL) (Texas)	0–5	(Texas) ASC New Stars (HFA)	Cibolo, Texas
7:30 pm CST		Report		Stadium: Cibolo Multi-Event Center

November 2, 2025	Virginia Dream FC (UPSL)	6–1	(Washington, D.C.) Guerrilla FC (DCPL)	Falls Church, Virginia
8:00 pm EST		Report		Stadium: Meridian High School

November 2, 2025	International San Francisco (SFSFL) (California)	0–4	(California) San Ramon FC (TLC)	San Francisco, California
5:15 pm PST		Report		Stadium: James P. Lang Soccer Field

November 2, 2025	Omaha Street FC (UPSL) (Nebraska)	2–4	(Missouri) BOHFS St. Louis (MWPL)	La Vista, Nebraska
7:30 pm CST		Report		Stadium: CHI Nebraska Multisport Complex

== Final Qualifying Round ==
The thirty-two third round winners played the fourth and final qualifying round November 22–23. The winner of each of the 16 ties officially qualified for the 2026 U.S. Open Cup.

November 22, 2025	Croatia Cleveland (NCSL) (Ohio)	2–3	(Pennsylvania) Steel City FC (USL2)	Mentor, Ohio
5:00 pm EST		Report		Stadium: Mentor High School

November 22, 2025	FC Lonestar Gpse (UPSL) (Massachusetts)	2–5	(Massachusetts) CD Faialense (BSSL)	Lawrence, Massachusetts
6:00 pm EST		Report		Stadium: Veterans Memorial Stadium

November 22, 2025	Southern Indiana FC (UPSL)	2–0	(North Carolina) Briar United FC (UPSL)	New Albany, Indiana
6:00 pm EST		Report		Stadium: Green Valley Soccer Complex

November 22, 2025	MSI Pro (UPSL) (Maryland)	0–2 (a.e.t.)	Virginia Dream FC (UPSL)	Silver Spring, Maryland
7:30 pm EST		Report		Stadium: Martin Luther King Jr. Park

November 22, 2025	Ballard FC (USL2) (Washington (state))	0–1	(California) Valley 559 FC (UPSL)	Seattle, Washington
5:00 pm PST		Report		Stadium: Interbay Stadium

November 22, 2025	Next Level Soccer (UPSL) (Arizona)	3–3 (a.e.t.) (3–4 SO)	(Colorado) Azteca FC (CPL)	Gilbert, Arizona
7:00 pm MST		Report		Stadium: Higley High School

November 22, 2025	Laguna United FC (UPSL) (California)	4–2	(California) San Diego Internacional (UPSL)	Laguna Niguel, California
7:00 pm EST		Report		Stadium: La Paz Sports Park

November 23, 2025	BOHFS St. Louis (MWPL) (Missouri)	3–2	(Illinois) Chicago House AC (MWPL)	St. Louis, Missouri
2:00 pm CST		Report		Stadium: St. Mary's High School

November 23, 2025	FC America CFL Spurs (UPSL) (Florida)	1–1 (a.e.t.) (5–4 SO)	(Florida) Harbor City FC (UPSL)	Lake Mary, Florida
4:30 pm EST		Report		Stadium: Lake Mary High School

November 23, 2025	Oaklyn United FC (APSL) (New Jersey)	1–2	(New Jersey) SC Vistula Garfield (APSL)
6:00 pm EST		Report

November 23, 2025	Miami United FC (UPSL) (Florida)	3–5 (a.e.t.)	(Florida) Badgers FC (UPSL)	Broward County, Florida
7:00 pm EST		Report		Stadium: Central Broward Park

November 23, 2025	Zum Schneider FC (APSL) (New York (state))	2–4	(New York (state)) NY Renegades FC (UPSL)	New York City, New York
7:00 pm EST		Report		Stadium: Jack McManus Field

November 23, 2025	Denton Diablos (MPPL) (Texas)	0–0 (a.e.t.) (3–4 SO)	(Texas) ASC New Stars (HFA)	Denton, Texas
2:00 pm CST		Report		Stadium: Norma Knobel Hunt Stadium

November 23, 2025	Kalonji Pro-Profile (UPSL) (Georgia (U.S. state))	1–0	(Georgia (U.S. state)) Potros FC (UPSL)	Snellville, Georgia
7:00 pm EST		Report		Stadium: Shiloh High School

November 23, 2025	Red Force FC (PFL) (Florida)	4–1	(Florida) City Soccer FC (UPSL)	Miami, Florida
7:30 pm EST		Report		Stadium: Kendal Soccer Park

November 23, 2025	San Ramon FC (TLC) (California)	2–1	(California) The Olympic Club (SFSFL)	San Ramon, California
7:00 pm PST		Report		Stadium: Tiffany Roberts Field
