= List of Canadian soccer clubs in American leagues =

The following lists contain Canadian soccer clubs who have played in US-based leagues at Division I, II, III, or below in the United States soccer league system. In the 2025 season, there were five of such clubs.

== Men's teams ==
=== Active teams ===
==== Division I ====
Major League Soccer
Team	City	Debut season
CF Montréal (Note: CF Montréal was previously known as the Montreal Impact)	Montreal, Quebec	2012
Toronto FC	Toronto, Ontario	2007
Vancouver Whitecaps FC (Note: The current Vancouver Whitecaps FC are a phoenix club of the 1974–1984 and 1987–2010 Vancouver Whitecaps teams)	Vancouver, British Columbia	2011

==== Division III ====
MLS Next Pro
Team	City	Debut season
Toronto FC II (Note: Toronto FC II previously played in the USL Championship from 2015–2018 and USL League One from 2019–2021)	Toronto, Ontario	2022
Whitecaps FC 2 (Note: Whitecaps FC 2 previously played in the USL Championship from 2015–2017)	Burnaby, British Columbia	2022

=== Former teams ===
==== Division I ====
United Soccer Association
Team	City	Seasons	Debut season	Final season
Toronto City	Toronto, Ontario	1	1967	
Vancouver Royal Canadians	Vancouver, British Columbia	1	1967	

National Professional Soccer League (1967)
Team	City	Seasons	Debut season	Final season
Toronto Falcons	Toronto, Ontario	1	1967	

North American Soccer League (1968–1984)
Team	City	Seasons	Debut season	Final season
Calgary Boomers	Calgary, Alberta	1	1981	
Edmonton Drillers	Edmonton, Alberta	4	1979	1982
Montreal Manic	Montreal, Quebec	3	1981	1983
Montreal Olympique	Montreal, Quebec	3	1971	1973
Toronto Metros/Metro-Croatia/Blizzard	Toronto, Ontario	14	1971	1984
Toronto Falcons	Toronto, Ontario	1	1968	
Vancouver Royals	Vancouver, British Columbia	1	1968	
Vancouver Whitecaps	Vancouver, British Columbia	11	1974	1984

==== Division II ====
North American Soccer Football League
Team	City	Seasons	Debut season	Final season
Toronto Greenbacks	Toronto, Ontario	2	1946	1947

Western Soccer Alliance
Team	City	Seasons	Debut season	Final season
Edmonton Brick Men	Edmonton, Alberta	1 (Note: Edmonton played as a guest team for some matches in the 1985 WSA season)	1986	
Victoria Riptides	Victoria, British Columbia	1	1985	

American Professional Soccer League
Team	City	Seasons	Debut season	Final season
Montreal Impact (Note: Montreal later played in the USL leagues from 1997–2010, the NASL in 2011, and the MLS beginning in 2012)	Montreal, Quebec	4	1993	1996
Toronto Blizzard	Toronto, Ontario	1	1993	
Toronto Rockets	Toronto, Ontario	1	1994	
Vancouver 86ers (Note: Vancouver later played in the USL leagues from 1997–2010 and the MLS beginning in 2011)	Vancouver, British Columbia	4	1993	1996

USL A-League / USL First Division / USSF Division 2 Professional League
Team	City	Seasons	Debut season	Final season
Calgary Storm/Mustangs (Note: Calgary played in the PDL in 2001)	Calgary, Alberta	3	2002	2004
Edmonton Aviators	Edmonton, Alberta	1	2004	
Montreal Impact (Note: Montreal also played in the APSL in 1993–1996 and afterwards played in the NASL in 2011, followed by the MLS beginning in 2012)	Montreal, Quebec	13 (Note: Montreal was on hitaus in 1999.)	1997	2010
Toronto Lynx (Note: Toronto Lynx played in the PDL from 2007 to 2014)	Toronto, Ontario	10	1997	2006
Vancouver 86ers/Whitecaps (Note: Vancouver also played in the APSL in 1993–1996 and afterwards played in the MLS beginning in 2011)	Vancouver, British Columbia	14	1997	2010

North American Soccer League (2011–2017)
Team	City	Seasons	Debut season	Final season
FC Edmonton	Edmonton, Alberta	7	2011	2017
Montreal Impact (Note: Montreal also played in the APSL in 1993–1994, the USL leagues from 1995–2010, afterwards the MLS beginning in 2012)	Montreal, Quebec	1	2011	
Ottawa Fury FC (Note: Ottawa played in the PDL from 2005–2013 and later the USL Championship from 2017–2019)	Ottawa, Ontario	3	2014	2016

USL Championship (Note: Division III league up to and including 2016)
Team	City	Seasons	Debut season	Final season
FC Montreal	Montreal, Quebec	2	2015	2016
Ottawa Fury FC (Note: Ottawa played in the PDL from 2005–2013 and the NASL from 2014–2016)	Ottawa, Ontario	3	2017	2019
Toronto FC II (Note: Toronto moved to USL League One in 2019)	Toronto, Ontario	4	2015	2018
Whitecaps FC 2	Vancouver, British Columbia	3	2015	2017

==== Division III ====
USL League One
Team	City	Seasons	Debut season	Final season
Toronto FC II (Note: Toronto FC II previously played in the USL Championship prior to 2019 and moved to MLS Next Pro in 2022)	Toronto, Ontario	2 (Note: Toronto FC II did not play in 2020 because of COVID-19 restrictions.)	2019	2021

==== Lower divisions ====
PDL/USL League Two
Team	City	Seasons	Debut season	Final season
Abbotsford Athletes in Action/86ers Select	Abbotsford, British Columbia	3	1998	2000
Calgary Foothills FC	Calgary, Alberta	5	2015	2019
Calgary Storm (Note: Calgary played in the USL A-League from 2002–2004)	Calgary, Alberta	1	2001	
Calgary Storm Prospects	Calgary, Alberta	2	2002	2003
FC London	London, Ontario	7	2009	2015
Abbotsford Rangers/Fraser Valley Mariners	Abbotsford, British Columbia	10	2003	2012
Hamilton Rage/K–W United FC	Kitchener, Ontario	7	2011	2017
FC Manitoba (Note: FC Manitoba was previously known as WSA Winnipeg)	Winnipeg, Manitoba	11 (Note: FC Manitoba did not play in 2020 and 2021 in USL2, due to the COVID-19 pandemic)	2011	2023
Montreal Impact U23	Montreal, Quebec	1	2014	
Okanagan Challenge	Kelowna, British Columbia	1	1998	
Okanagan Predators	Kelowna, British Columbia	1	2001	
Ottawa Fury (Note: Ottawa later played in the NASL from 2014–2016 and later the USL Championship from 2017–2019)	Ottawa, Ontario	9	2005	2013
Thunder Bay Chill	Thunder Bay, Ontario	23 (Note: Thunder Bay Chill did not play in 2020 and 2021 in USL2, due to the COVID-19 pandemic)	2000	2024
Toronto FC III	Toronto, Ontario	2	2015	2016
Toronto Lynx (Note: Toronto Lynx played in the USL leagues from 1997–2006)	Toronto, Ontario	8	2007	2014
Vancouver TSS Rovers	Burnaby, British Columbia	3	2017	2019
Vancouver Whitecaps FC U-23	Vancouver, British Columbia	8	2008	2014
Victoria Highlanders	Victoria, British Columbia	10 (Note: Victoria Highlanders did not play in the PDL in 2015)	2009	2019
Victoria Umbro Select	Victoria, British Columbia	1	1998	

United Premier Soccer League
Team	City	Seasons	Debut season	Final season
FC Berlin	Buffalo, New York (Note: FC Berlin is a club from Kitchener, Ontario, but operates the club out of Buffalo, NY for the UPSL season)	6	2021	2024
Chantilly Forever FC	Buffalo, New York (Note: Chantilly Forever FC is a club from Hamilton, Ontario, but operates the club out of Buffalo, New York for the UPSL season)	3	2022	2024

=== League Championship seasons ===
Div.	Team	Year	Final
I	Toronto Metros-Croatia	1976	3–0 vs Minnesota Kicks
I	Vancouver Whitecaps	1979	2–1 vs Tampa Bay Rowdies
I	Toronto FC	2017	2–0 vs Seattle Sounders FC
II	Montreal Impact	1994	1–0 vs Colorado Foxes
II	Montreal Impact (2)	2004	2–0 vs Seattle Sounders
II	Vancouver Whitecaps FC	2006	3–0 vs Rochester Raging Rhinos
II	Vancouver Whitecaps FC (2)	2008	2–1 Puerto Rico Islanders
II	Montreal Impact (3)	2009	6–3 (agg.) vs Vancouver Whitecaps FC
IV (Note: Leagues below tier three are not officially ranked. Division 4 is an unofficial classification.)	Thunder Bay Chill	2008	1–1 (4–1 p.) vs Laredo Heat
IV	Forest City London	2012	2–1 vs Carolina Dynamo
IV	K–W United FC	2015	4–3 vs New York Red Bulls U-23
IV	Calgary Foothills FC	2018	4–2 (a.e.t.) vs Reading United AC

== Women's teams ==
=== Active teams ===
There are currently no active Canadian teams in US leagues.

=== Former teams ===
==== Division II ====
USL W-League
Team	City	Seasons	Debut season	Final season
Calgary Wildfire	Calgary, Alberta	1	2004	
Edmonton Aviators Women	Edmonton, Alberta	1	2004	
Laval Dynamites	Laval, Quebec	3	1999	2001
Laval Comets	Laval, Quebec	10	2006	2015
Quebec Amiral/Dynamo	Quebec City, Quebec	7	2009	2015
Hamilton Avalanche/Rage/K-W United Women	Kitchener, Ontario	9	2006	2014
Montreal Xtreme	Montreal, Quebec	1	2004	
Ottawa Fury Women	Ottawa, Ontario	15	2000	2014
Sudbury Canadians	Sudbury, Ontario	2	2004	2006
Victoria Highlanders Women	Victoria, British Columbia	2	2011	2012
London Gryphons	London, Ontario	11	2004	2014
Toronto Inferno	Toronto, Ontario	6	1999	2004
Toronto Lady Lynx	Toronto, Ontario	10	2005	2014
Vancouver Breakers/Whitecaps Women	Vancouver, British Columbia	12	2001	2012

Women's Premier Soccer League
Team	City	Seasons	Debut season	Final season
Vancouver Angels	Vancouver, British Columbia	1	2000	
North Shore Girls SC	North Vancouver, British Columbia	2	2016	2017
TSS FC Rovers Women	Burnaby, British Columbia	2	2018	2019
Vancouver Island FC	Victoria, British Columbia	1	2019	

United Women's Soccer
Team	City	Seasons	Debut season	Final season
Calgary Foothills WFC	Calgary, Alberta	7	2017	2024
Queen City United SC	Regina, Saskatchewan	1	2019	
St. Albert Impact FC	St. Albert, Alberta	2	2021	2022
FC Berlin	Buffalo, New York (Note: FC Berlin is a club from Kitchener, Ontario, but operates the club out of Buffalo, NY for the UWS season)	3	2022	2024

=== League Championship seasons ===
Div.	Team	Year	Final
II (Note: Unlike men's soccer, the USSF has not specifically designated tiers or levels below the NWSL. However, the USL W-League, the Women's Premier Soccer League (WPSL), and the United Women's Soccer (UWS) act as unofficial lower divisions.)	Vancouver Whitecaps	2004	0–0 (4–2 p.) vs New Jersey Wildcats
II	Vancouver Whitecaps (2)	2006	3–0 vs Ottawa Fury
II	Ottawa Fury	2012	1–1 (4–3 p.) vs Pali Blues

== See also ==
- List of association football clubs playing in the league of another country
