= Lawrence Stadium =

Lawrence Stadium may refer to

in Arizona

- J. Lawrence Walkup Skydome in Flagstaff, Arizona

in California

- Tony Zupo Field, originally known as Lawrence Park, in Lodi, California

in Kansas

- Lawrence–Dumont Stadium in Wichita, Kansas
- Memorial Stadium (University of Kansas) in Lawrence, Kansas
- Haskell Memorial Stadium in Lawrence, Kansas
- Hoglund Ballpark in Lawrence, Kansas
- McCook Field (stadium) in Lawrence, Kansas

in Massachusetts

- Veterans Memorial Stadium in Lawrence, Massachusetts

in New York

- Robert K. Kraft Field at Lawrence A. Wien Stadium in Manhattan, New York

== See also ==
- List of stadiums in North America
