= Yazmeen Jamieson =

Canadian-Jamaican footballer (born 1998)

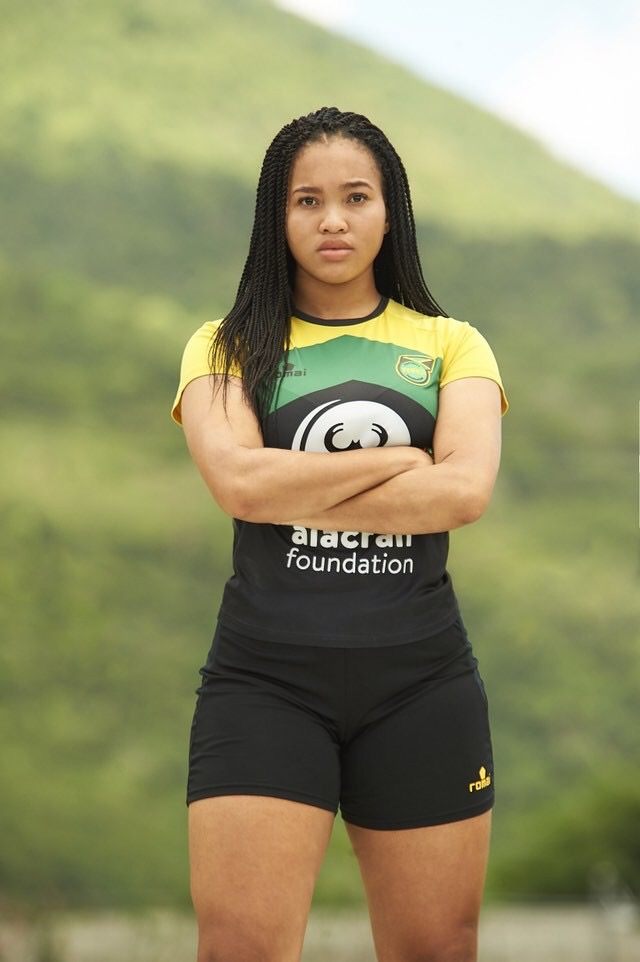
- Jamieson with Jamaica in 2019

Personal information
- Full name: Yazmeen Alexis Jamieson
- Date of birth: 17 March 1998 (age 28)
- Place of birth: Toronto, Ontario, Canada
- Height: 1.80 m (5 ft 11 in)
- Position: Goalkeeper

Team information
- Current team: FC Berlin (indoor)
- Number: 99

Youth career
- Toronto Eagles SC
- Unionville Milliken SC

College career
Years	Team	Apps	(Gls)
2016–2018	Carleton Ravens		
2024–2025	George Brown Huskies	10	(0)

Senior career*
Years	Team	Apps	(Gls)
2019	Papakura City	5	(0)
2021	P18 IK	7	(0)
2022	Simcoe County Rovers FC	12	(0)
2022	GPSO 92 Issy	1	(0)
2023	Simcoe County Rovers FC	9	(1)
2024	KFF Vllaznia Shkodër	0	(0)
2025	Guelph United	5	(0)
2026–	FC Berlin (indoor)	3	(2)

International career^{‡}
2017–2018	Jamaica U-20	5	(0)
2018–	Jamaica	6	(0)
Medal record
Representing Jamaica
CONCACAF W Championship
Third place	2022 Mexico
- * Club domestic league appearances and goals as of 4 August 2025 ‡ National team caps and goals as of 9 April 2022

Yazmeen Alexis Jamieson (born 17 March 1998) is a footballer who plays as a goalkeeper for FC Berlin in Major Arena Soccer League Women. Born in Canada, she plays for the Jamaica national team.

== Early life ==
Jamieson was born to a Jamaican father and a Grenadian mother. She started playing soccer at age 6. She attended Bayview Glen School, winning the Elite Athlete Award. She played youth soccer with Toronto Eagles SC and Unionville Milliken SC. She was awarded the 2017 Grenada Association of Toronto Diaspora Award.

== University career ==
She played for Carleton University from 2016 to 2018 and suffered from an injury in 2017. In 2019, she gave up her college eligibility in order to play professionally overseas in New Zealand to improve her chances for the Jamaican national team selection for the 2019 FIFA Women's World Cup.

In 2024, she began attending George Brown College, where she played for the women's soccer team. She made her debut on September 6 against the Loyalist Lad Lancers, recording a shutout. At the end of the 2024 season, she was named an OCAA East Division First Team All-Star.

== Club career ==
In 2019, she joined New Zealand club Papakura City, where she made her senior debut.

In 2021, Yazmeen signed a short-term contract with the Swedish club P18 IK in the second division. She started 6 out of the seven matches she was there for and helped bring the team to the final playoffs round. The team won the final match therefore promoting them to Division 1 in Sweden.

In 2022, she joined Canadian club Simcoe County Rovers in League1 Ontario. She was named a league Third Team All-Star in 2022.

In September 2022, she joined GPSO 92 Issy in the French Division 2 Féminine.

In 2023, she returned to Simcoe County Rovers FC. On July 12, she scored a penalty kick in a 7–0 victory over ProStars FC.

In 2024, she signed with Albanian Women's National Championship club KFF Vllaznia Shkodër.

In 2025, she signed with League1 Ontario club Guelph United.

In January 2026, she joined Major Arena Soccer League Women side FC Berlin.

== International career ==
In 2013, at age 15, while on a tour to Jamaica with her youth club team, the Jamaican women's technical director learned of her Jamaican heritage and arranged for her to trial with the Jamaican U20 team. Soon after, she made the roster for the Jamaican U17 team for the U17 World Cup qualifier, however, she was unable to secure her Jamaican citizenship and passport in time and was unable to join the team.

In November 2017, she received her first cap to the Jamaica U20. She was later named to the roster for the 2018 CONCACAF Women's U-20 Championship.

In 2018, she was named to the Jamaica senior team for the first time.
