= Brianne Desa =

Canadian-Guyanese footballer (born 2000)

Personal information
- Date of birth: 6 July 2000 (age 26)
- Place of birth: Pickering, Ontario, Canada
- Height: 1.75 m (5 ft 9 in)
- Position: Midfielder

Team information
- Current team: FC Berlin (indoor)

Youth career
- –2017: Pickering FC
- 2018: FC Durham Academy
- 2018: Markham SC

College career
Years	Team	Apps	(Gls)
2018	Brock Badgers	16	(5)
2020–	Seneca Sting		

Senior career*
Years	Team	Apps	(Gls)
2017	Durham United FA	3	(0)
2019	Durham United FA	9	(0)
2021	Vaughan Azzurri	11	(1)
2022–2023	Simcoe County Rovers	37	(14)
2024	Vaughan Azzurri	14	(4)
2024	→ Vaughan Azzurri B	2	(0)
2025–	Pickering FC	14	(2)
2025–	FC Berlin (indoor)	4	(10)

International career^{‡}
2020	Guyana U20	10	(2)
2018–	Guyana	13	(5)
- * Club domestic league appearances and goals as of 31 December 2025 ‡ National team caps and goals as of 5 Mar 2026

Brianne Desa (born 6 July 2000) is a footballer who plays as a midfielder for FC Berlin in Major Arena Soccer League Women.. Born in Canada, she represents Guyana at the international level.

== Early life ==
A native of Pickering, Ontario, Desa played youth soccer with Pickering FC, Markham SC and FC Durham Academy.

== College career ==
In 2018, Desa attended Brock University, playing for the women's soccer team. She scored two goals in her debut on August 24 in a 2–1 victory over the Waterloo Warriors. She was named an OUA Second Team All Star after leading Brock with five goals on the season.

Afterwards, she began attending Seneca College, where she played for the women's soccer team.

== Club career ==
In 2017, she played for Durham United FA in League1 Ontario, appearing in three matches. She returned to the side in 2019, appearing in nine matches

In 2021, she played for Vaughan Azzurri in League1 Ontario, appearing in 11 league games, scoring once against Hamilton United on October 14. She scored in the playoff semi-final match against Woodbridge Strikers, who defeated Vaughan in a penalty shootout. She was named a league Second Team All Star.

In 2022, she joined the Simcoe County Rovers. She scored her first goal on April 30 against Alliance United. She was named a league Second Team All-Star in 2022.

In 2024, she played with Vaughan Azzurri and was named a league First Team All-Star.

In 2025, she joined Pickering FC (who she previously played for when they were known as Durham United). She was named a league First Team All-Star in 2025.

In late 2025, she began playing indoor soccer with FC Berlin in Major Arena Soccer League Women.

== International career ==
Desa represents the Guyana women's national football team.

== International goals ==
Scores and results list Guyana's goal tally first

No.	Date	Venue	Opponent	Score	Result	Competition
1	23 May 2018	Synthetic Track and Field Facility, Leonora, Guyana	Bermuda	1–1	2–2	2018 CONCACAF Women's Championship qualification
2	25 May 2018	Synthetic Track and Field Facility, Leonora, Guyana	Suriname	2–1	6–1	2018 CONCACAF Women's Championship qualification
3	5 March 2026	Sir Vivian Richards Stadium, St. John's, Antigua and Barbuda	Antigua and Barbuda	2–0	4–0	2026 CONCACAF W Championship qualification
