= FC Berlin =

FC Berlin may refer to:

- FC Berlin (Canada/United States), a Canadian/American soccer team
- Berliner FC Dynamo, a German football club formerly known as FC Berlin
