= Potros FC =

- Full name: Potros Football Club
- Nickname: Los Potros
- Founded: 2016
- Ground: Marietta High School, Georgia
- League: United Premier Soccer League (UPSL), Georgia West
- Website: https://potrosfc.com

Potros FC (Potros Football Club), nicknamed Los Potros, is an American pre-professional soccer club based in Cobb County, Georgia, United States. Founded in 2016, the club competes in the United Premier Soccer League (UPSL).

== History ==
Potros FC competed in local amateur soccer before joining the UPSL in fall 2020. The club's admission was announced as part of the league's expansion in Georgia.

== U.S. Open Cup ==
=== 2026 qualification ===
Potros FC reached the final qualifying round for the 2026 U.S. Open Cup but lost 1–0 to Kalonji Pro-Profile in November 2025.

=== 2027 qualification ===
In qualifying for the 2027 U.S. Open Cup, Potros FC defeated Buckhead SC 3–1 in the first round and Terminus FC 5–0 in the second round. The results advanced the club to the third qualifying round.

On November 1st, 2026, the club faced Swarm FC in the third qualifying round losing 3-1.

== See also ==
United Premier Soccer League
