= Baltimore City F.C. =

- Full name: Baltimore City Football Club
- Nickname: BCFC
- Founded: 2023; 3 years ago
- Ground: Utz Field, Patterson Park
- League: APSL; UPSL; Maryland Super Soccer League
- 2025: ?
- Website: bcfc23.com
Home colors

Baltimore City Football Club is an American amateur soccer team based in Baltimore, Maryland. The club plays in the amateur Maryland Super Soccer League and the DMV division of the United Premier Soccer League. They have previously competed in the NISA Independent Cup, the Maryland Major Soccer League, and the Mid-Atlantic Division of the Eastern Premier Soccer League.

== History ==
Founded by a collective of local soccer players and up and local businesses, the club has aimed and been successful in keep its operations and outreach network within the city itself, with plans for a grassroots approach for sustainable success of the sport in the city.

The club, in its first season, won the Spring season of the Maryland Major Soccer League in penalties vs Columbia F.C. This was followed up with a further undefeated run of 12 games ending towards the end of the summer 2023 season despite having won the title already.

During the Summer League tournament, Baltimore City F.C. again came away with the trophy, its second in its first two competitions. The reserve team also won the Division 1 Howard County Soccer League.

In the fall of 2023, Baltimore City F.C. again reached the season final again versus Columbia F.C but this time, Columbia won the title on penalties. Nonetheless, the following week Baltimore City F.C. received an invitation to join the expanding Mid-Atlantic Division of the Eastern Premier Soccer League.

In its first Winter Cup, Baltimore City F.C. won on penalties versus cross-town rival Baltimore Kickers, but succumbed to Columbia F.C. in the second round.

In their debut Eastern Premier Soccer League season, Baltimore City F.C. finished above expectations claiming fourth place and the final playoff spot, qualifying on the final day over Columbia F.C. who were also in the running for that spot. In the playoffs, City fell to NoVa F.C. in the semi-final but qualified for the NISA Independent Cup. Here they came up against Maryland Bobcats F.C. and lead until minute 80, finishing in a 2–1 loss. In the Summer MDV Cup Baltimore City F.C. worked their way through the playoffs until the final, succumbing to Great Falls FC 2–1.

Autumn season brought a number of new players with a fresh focus on winning silverware. City finished fourth in the fall season narrowly missing automatic qualification for the Eastern Premier League soccer summer 2025 playoffs. They did however prevail in the Maryland Major Soccer League claiming their third title over Le Syli DMV.

In the Spring of 2025 Baltimore City F.C. went undefeated during the spring regular season of the American Premier Soccer League finishing top the league and awarding them the #2 seed heading into the APSL Mid-Atlantic Playoffs, which saw them matched up against cross-town rivals Christos F.C. Christos won that matchup 3–2, which would also be the final time both teams took part in the APSL, with Baltimore moving their efforts to the United Premier Soccer League & Maryland Super Soccer League. Meanwhile, Baltimore also got promoted from the second division of the MSSL on the final day.

Their efforts however did not go unrewarded and Baltimore will feature in the 2026 U.S. Open Cup qualifiers in September 2025.

=== Year-by-year ===
Year	Regional League	Conference	Regular season (WDL)	Regional Playoffs	State League	State Playoffs	MD Cup	U.S. Open Cup
2023 Spring	N/A	N/A	N/A	N/A	7-0-2 (1st out of 10)	Champions (MMSL)	Champion (MMSL Summer Tournament)	–
2023 Fall	N/A	N/A	N/A	N/A	6-0-3 (2nd out of 10)	Runner Up (MMSL)	MDV Cup Quarter-final	–
2024 Spring	Eastern Premier Soccer League	Mid-Atlantic	6-1-2 (4th out of 10)	Semi-Final	1-0-8 (7th out of 8)	Did not qualify	MDV Cup Runner-up	–
2024 Fall	Eastern Premier Soccer League	Mid-Atlantic	3-2-2 (5th out of 10)	Did not qualify	7-0-2 (1st out of 10)	Champions (MMSL)	Morton Cup Runner-up	–
2025 Spring	Eastern Premier Soccer League	Mid-Atlantic	7-0-1 (1st out of 10)	Semi-Final	5-2-3 (3rd out of 7)	Champions (Promotion Playoffs)	MDV Cup Semi-finalist	-
2025 Fall								2nd Qualifying Round

== Honours ==
- NISA Independent Cup
- Maryland Super Soccer League
  - Champions (3): 2023 Spring, 2023 Summer, 2024 Fall
  - Runners-up (1): 2024 Fall
- Maryland Super Soccer League D2
  - Runners-up (1): 2025 (promoted)
- Morton Cup
  - Runners-up (1): 2025
- MDV Cup
  - Runners-up (1): 2024 Summer
- Howard County Premier Division
  - Champions (1): 2023 Spring, 2022 Fall (as MD Old Boys)
