= 1974 National Challenge Cup =

- Dewar Challenge Cup

Tournament details
- Country: United States
- Dates: 27 January – 2 June 1974

Final positions
- Champions: Greek American AA (4th title)
- Runners-up: Chicago Croatian

The 1974 National Challenge Cup was the 61st edition of the United States Soccer Football Association's annual open soccer championship. Teams from the North American Soccer League declined to participate. The Greek American AA of New York City defeated the Croatian SC of Chicago in the final game. The match was held on June 2.

== Bracket ==
Round of 16
March 17 - New York
NY Greek American | 2
Doxa SC | 0
March 31 - New Britain
New Britain | 3
Boston | 0
February 24
Casa Bianca | 1
Co-Aurora | 0
March 17
Philadelphia Inter | 2
Newark Ukrainians | 1
April 21
Pepsi-Cola | w/o
Tulsa Internationals
April 21 - Chicago
Croatian | 3
Milwaukee Bavarian | 0
January 27 - San Pedro
San Pedro Yugoslavs | 1
LA Gauchos | 2
March 17 - San Francisco
SFIAC | 5
Tacoma Heidelberg | 0

Quarterfinals
April 14 - New York
Greek American | 4
New Britain | 1
April 14 - Baltimore
Casa Bianca | 2
Philadelphia Inter | 1
April 28 - Edwardsville
Pepsi-Cola | 0
Croatian | 1
March 31/April 7 - SP/SF
Gauchos | 3-1
SFAC | 1-1

Semi-finals
April 28 - New York
Greek American | 1
Casa Bianca | 0
May 19 - Chicago
Croatian | 1(3)
Gauchos | 1(2)

Final
June 2 - New York
Greek American | 1
Croatian | 0

== Sources ==
Chicago Tribune
Los Angeles Times
New York Times
St.Louis Post-Dispatch
San Francisco Chronicle
