= Jethro Yumange =

Papua New Guinean soccer player

Personal information
- Date of birth: 3 October 2002 (age 24)
- Place of birth: Wewak, Papua New Guinea
- Height: 1.70 m (5 ft 7 in)
- Position: Forward

Team information
- Current team: Diverse City

Youth career
- 2015–2017: Rockingham City

College career
Years	Team	Apps	(Gls)
2021–2022	Chicago State Cougars	28	(2)
2023–2024	Carthage Firebirds	23	(5)

Senior career*
Years	Team	Apps	(Gls)
2017–2021	Rockingham City		
2019–2020	→ Cockburn City (loan)		
2022–2023	Chicago City		
2024–2025	River Light	2	(0)
2025	RKC Third Coast	5	(0)
2025–2026	Black Cat		
2026–	Diverse City		

International career^{‡}
2024–	Papua New Guinea	3	(0)
- * Club domestic league appearances and goals as of 18:16, 10 February 2026 (UTC) ‡ National team caps and goals as of 18:50, 10 February 2026 (UTC)

Jethro Yumange (born 10 March 2002) is a Papua New Guinean footballer who currently plays for Diverse City FC and the Papua New Guinea national team.

== Club career ==
Born in Papua New Guinea, Yumange moved to Perth, Australia at age ten. He began playing football there with his school team. In 2015, he joined Rockingham City and played for the under-15 side. During his first season, the club went undefeated with Yumange as its top scorer. Two weeks before his sixteenth birthday, he was promoted to the senior side in the NPL Western Australia. In 2019 he moved to Cockburn City of the same league. That year, the team finished second in the state under-20 cup, falling to the academy of Perth Glory in the final with Yumange starting the match. Yumange departed the club following the season, and returned to Rockingham City in 2020. He remained with the club through the 2021 season.

In 2021, Yumange committed to play NCAA Division I college soccer in the United States with the Chicago State Cougars. Over his two seasons with the club, he made twenty-eight appearances, scoring two goals. Following the 2022 season, he transferred to Carthage College to play for the Firebirds in the NCAA Division III. During breaks in the college season, Yumange played semi-professional football in the USL League Two and Midwest Premier League to remain fit. He featured for Chicago City SC in the MPL in 2022. In 2024, he played for River Light FC of the USL League Two, but was limited to just two league appearances because of international duty.

Yumange moved to fellow-USL League Two side RKC Third Coast for the 2025 season. He made five appearances for the club throughout the season. By September of that year, he joined Black Cat FC of the United Premier Soccer League. He participated in the club in 2026 U.S. Open Cup qualification with the club. In the First Qualifying Round, he scored against Edgewater Castle FC of the Midwest Premier League. Black Cat FC went on to lose the match 1–2, ending its qualifying campaign. In December 2025, it was announced that Yumange had joined Diverse City FC, also of the UPSL Premier Division, for the 2026 season.

== International career ==
Yumange received his first call-up to the Papua New Guinea national team for the 2024 OFC Men's Nations Cup. He made his debut in Papua New Guinea's opening match against Fiji on 16 June 2024 and went on to appear in all three of his country's matches in the competition.

== Career statistics ==
=== International ===
As of match played 22 June 2024

Papua New Guinea
Year	Apps	Goals
2024	3	0
Total	3	0
