= Iowa Demon Hawks =

Semi-pro soccer team based in Des Moines, Iowa

- Full name: Iowa Demon Hawks
- Founded: 2017; 9 years ago
- Stadium: MidAmerican RecPlex (Outdoor) Buccaneer Arena (Indoor)
- Owner: Darwin Salas
- President: Darwin Salas
- League: Men's Outdoor: National Premier Soccer League (NPSL) Men's Indoor: Major Arena Soccer League 2 (MASL2) Women's Indoor: Major Arena Soccer League Women (MASLW)
- Website: https://www.iowademonhawks.com/

The Iowa Demon Hawks are an American soccer club based in Des Moines, Iowa. The club operates a men's outdoor team in the National Premier Soccer League (NPSL), a men's indoor team in the Major Arena Soccer League 2 (MASL2), and a women's indoor team in the Major Arena Soccer League Women (MASL-W).

== History ==
Originally founded as Des Moines United FC in 2017, it started as a futsal club before joining the UPSL in 2021. After two seasons in the UPSL, they joined the NPSL for 2023.

The club also connected to its futsal roots by launching an indoor soccer team. The team played in Major Arena Soccer League 3 in 2021–22; for 2022–23, the club moved to Major Arena Soccer League 2, competing as the Iowa Demon Hawks and playing out of Cedar Rapids.

They returned to Des Moines area for the 2023–24 season, playing at Buccaneer Arena in suburban Urbandale. They would defeat their former co-tenants, the Iowa Raptors, in their first game back in their home metro.

After operating under both the Des Moines United and Iowa Demon Hawks names, the team unified under the Demon Hawks name in 2024. In addition, the club launched a women's team in Major Arena Soccer League Women (MASL-W) and hosted the league's inaugural playoff tournament.

== Team record: year-by-year ==
=== Outdoor ===
Year	League	Finish	Record	Playoffs	Open Cup
2021	UPSL	1st, Midwest South	5–1–2	Round of 16	N/A
2022	UPSL	4th, Midwest South	4–4–2	Round of 32	N/A
2023	NPSL	1st, Gateway	8–1–1	Regional Semifinals	N/A
2024	NPSL	3rd, Gateway	6–2–2	Regional Semifinals	N/A
2025	NPSL	5th, North	4–5–1	did not qualify	N/A
2026	NPSL				2nd Qualifying Round

=== Indoor men ===
Year	League	Finish	Record	Playoffs
2021–22	MASL3	1st, Midwest	3–1–0	Division Final
2022–23	MASL2	3rd, North	7–4–1	DNQ
2023–24	MASL2	1st, North	12–0–0	Champions
2024–25	MASL2	1st, North	10–1–1	Runners-up
2025–26	MASL2	1st, Midwest	12–0–0	Runners-up

=== Indoor women ===
Year	League	Finish	Record	Playoffs
2024–25	MASLW	3rd, Great Lakes North	5–5–0	Semifinal
2025–26	MASLW	1st, Midwest	10–0–0	Champions
