= Doxa SC =

- Full name: Doxa Soccer Club
- Founded: 1962; 64 years ago
- League: CSL and APSL
Home colors

The Doxa SC are a soccer team based in New Rochelle, New York. They currently compete in the Cosmopolitan Soccer League (CSL) and the American Premier Soccer League (APSL).

== History ==
Founded in 1962, the club played the National Challenge Cup in 1973, 1974 and 1975.

== Year-by-year ==
| Year | Division | League | Regular season | Playoffs | Open Cup |
|---|---|---|---|---|---|
| 1973 | 5 | CSL | | | 1st Round |
| 1974 | 5 | CSL | | | Round of 16 |
| 1975 | 5 | CSL | | | Round of 16 |
| 2020-21 | 5 | EPSL | 1st | | n/a |
