= Major Arena Soccer League Women =

Major Arena Soccer League Women (MASLW)
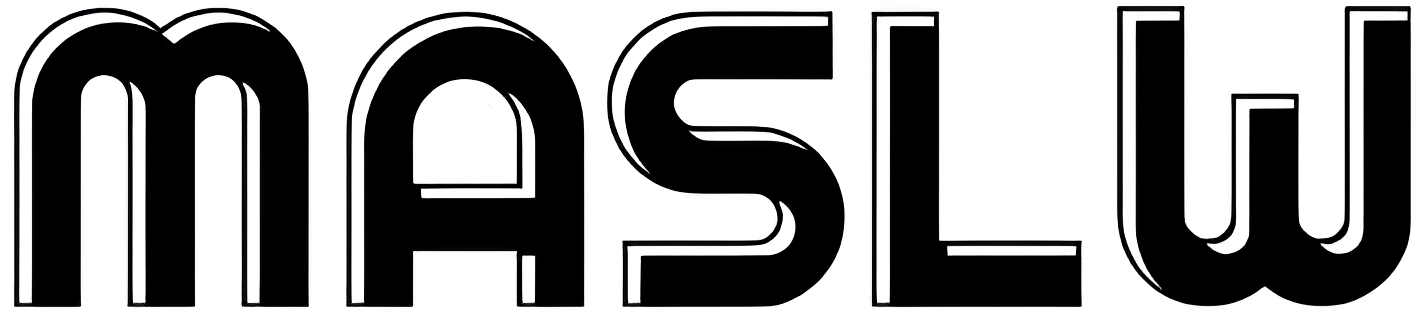
- Founded: 2024
- Number of clubs: 24
- Current champions: Iowa Demon Hawks (2025-26)
- Website: www.maslw.com

Major Arena Soccer League Women (MASLW) is a North American women's indoor soccer league that was created in 2024 and is part of the Major Arena Soccer League system. The commissioner is Chris Economides, who also serves as commissioner of MASL 2 and MASL 3.

== History ==
Established on September 3, 2024, the MASL formed a new women's indoor soccer league in North America under the MASL banner as a part of a historic unification of the main league, MASL 2 and MASL 3. They were rebranded from the former Premier Arena Soccer League's women's league.

== Teams ==
Inactive Club Active Club

| Division | Team | City/State | Arena | Joined |
|---|---|---|---|---|
| Great Lakes | Detroit City FC | Detroit, MI | Detroit City Fieldhouse | 2024 |
| Great Lakes | Indiana United FC | Hammond, IN | Hammond Sportsplex | 2024 |
| Great Lakes | FC Berlin | Kitchener, ON | Scarborough Soccer Centre | 2025 |
| Great Lakes | Youngstown Nighthawks | Youngstown, OH | Farmer Jim's Sports Complex | 2024 |
| Great Lakes | Cincinnati Sirens FC | Cincinnati, OH | GameTime Training Center | 2024 |
| Great Lakes | Chicago Mustangs | Hoffman Estates, IL | Grand Sports Arena | 2026 |
| Great Lakes | Columbus Eagles FC | Columbus, OH | Resolute Athletic Complex | 2024 |
| Great Lakes | Louisville Triumph FC | Louisville, KY | Mockingbird Valley Soccer Club | 2024 |
| Great Lakes | Süsserfuss Ballverein | Kent, OH | Akron Indoor Soccer Inc | 2024 |
| Heartland | ICT Aztecs | Wichita, KS | The Sports Zone | 2024 |
| Heartland | Side FC Cyclones | Oklahoma City, OK | Soccer City | 2024 |
| Heartland | OKC Ghosts | Oklahoma City, OK | Soccer Zone OKC | 2025 |
| Heartland | Tulsa FC Channel Cats | Tulsa, OK | Ascension St. John Sportsplex | 2024 |
| Heartland | Wichita Aero | Wichita, KS | The Sports Zone | 2024 |
| Heartland | Wichita Lady Luck | Park City, KS | Park City Arena | 2024 |
| Heartland | Iowa Demon Hawks | Urbandale, IA | Buccaneer Arena | 2024 |
| Heartland | Iowa Raptors | Cedar Rapids, IA | PowerHouse Arena | 2025 |
| Heartland | Indy Nights | Indianapolis, IN | SportsZone Indy | 2026 |
| Heartland | KS Astras | Kansas City, KS | SIG Sportsplex | 2025 |
| Heartland | Omaha Queens FC | Omaha, NE | Baxter Arena | 2024 |
| South | 512 FC | Austin, TX | Menchaca Soccer Zone | 2024 |
| South | Atlético Monterrey | Monterrey, Mexico | Liga Casabella | 2025 |
| South | Houston Bolt | Houston, TX | The Ballpark at League City | 2024 |
| South | Houston Indoor Club | Houston, TX | The Ballpark at League City | 2024 |
| South | RPFC | Richardson, TX | Soccer Spectrum | 2024 |
| South | Simply Futbol | Carrollton, TX | TOCA Soccer and Sports Center Carrolton | 2026 |
| South | Space City FC | Houston, TX | MAYA Indoor Soccer | 2026 |
| South | Texas Lone Star | Carrollton, TX | TOCA Soccer and Sports Center Carrolton | 2025 |

=== Champions ===
Overview of Major Arena Soccer League Women Champions
| Season | Champions | Runner-up | Score | Host |
|---|---|---|---|---|
| 2024–25 | Chihuahua Savage | Detroit City FC | 16–3 | Urbandale, Iowa |
| 2025–26 | Iowa Demon Hawks | RPFC (Dallas) | 7-4 | Detroit, MI |
