= Dr. Joaquín García High School =

Dr Joaquin García High School

Location
- Lake Worth, Florida 33467; United States; 26.6047°N 80.1879°W

Information
- School type: Public
- Established: 2023
- School district: School District of Palm Beach County
- Principal: Oscar Otero
- Teaching staff: 82.00 (FTE)
- Grades: 9-12
- Enrollment: 1,695 (2023–2024)
- Student to teacher ratio: 20.67
- Colors: Carolina Blue, Navy and White
- Nickname: Bulldogs
- Website: www.palmbeachschools.org/DrJoaquinGarciaHigh

Dr. Joaquín García High School is a public high school located in Lake Worth, Florida, United States.

== History ==
Dr. Joaquín García High School was established in 2023. The school is the first high school in Palm Beach County to be named after a Hispanic community leader. The school is named after Dr. Joaquín García, co-founder of the Hispanic Education Coalition, who died in December 2021.
