= American Premier Soccer League =

Soccer league in the Eastern United States

- Founded: July 23, 2020; 6 years ago (As the Eastern Premier Soccer League)
- First season: 2020–21
- Country: United States
- Confederation: CONCACAF (North American Football Union)
- Number of clubs: 74
- Relegation to: List: Delaware River Conference; Casa Select; Mayflower Conference; Casa Select Boston; Metropolitan Conference; Cosmopolitan Soccer League; Garden State Soccer League; Long Island Soccer Football League; Mid-Atlantic Conference; Maryland Major Soccer League; Mitten Conference; Michigan Premier Soccer League; Terminus Conference; Atlanta District Adult Soccer League
- Domestic cup(s): U.S. Open Cup (via qualifying tournament & NAC); National Amateur Cup (via USASA Region I)
- International cup(s): CONCACAF Champions League (via U.S. Open Cup)
- Current champions: WC Predators (1st title) (2024–25)
- Most championships: Northern Virginia FC (2 titles)
- Website: apslsoccer.com

The American Premier Soccer League (APSL) is a United States Adult Soccer Association affiliated amateur soccer league that includes teams from the eastern, midwest and southern portions of the country. Currently the league has members from Connecticut, Georgia, Maryland, Massachusetts, Michigan, New Jersey, New York, Pennsylvania, Texas, and Virginia competing in eight regional conferences.

Playing its first season in 2020–21 as the "Eastern Premier Soccer League" (EPSL), the league began as a partnership between the New York City–based Cosmopolitan Soccer League and the Maryland Major Soccer League. It was also an affiliate of the National Independent Soccer Association, a professionally sanctioned third division soccer association, from 2020 until 2025 when the National Independent Soccer Association, lost its professional sanctioning. The APSL is part of the only nationwide, inter-league promotion/relegation system in the United States.

== History ==
The league was announced on July 23, 2020, in a joint effort between the Cosmopolitan Soccer League and Maryland Major Soccer League to create a regional based multi-league promotion and relegation system in the United States. The league's goal is to have merit-based promotion from local amateur leagues, including champions, with the possibility of being relegated back into the local feeder leagues at the end of the season. The initial slate of members included many of the clubs that participated in the first division of the CSL the previous season.

In the following months, the EPSL added teams from additional leagues such as the Woodbridge Soccer League and United Premier Soccer League. On September 8, 2020, the league announced that the New Jersey–based Garden State Soccer League would become a feeder league for the EPSL. A future promotion spot in the Metropolitan Conference of the EPSL will be determined in a playoff between the champion of the GSSL and the champion of the Cosmopolitan Soccer League.

On September 4, 2020, the National Independent Soccer Association announced its latest amateur league affiliation with the EPSL. This affiliation ended on March 6, 2025 as a result of the National Independent Soccer Association losing its sanctioning as a professional league.

On February 20, 2025, prior to the second half of the 2024–25 season starting, the league officially changed its name to the "American Premier Soccer League". On April 4, 2025, the APSL announced its first expansion outside of the Northeast with the creation of Terminus Conference in Georgia. On December 28, 2025, the Trinity Conference in Texas was launched. The APSL announced its first conference in the Midwest, the Mitten Conference, in Michigan on January 15, 2026.

Overview of APSL clubs
Conference	Club	Location	Stadium	Founded	Joined	Conference Titles	League Titles
Constitution Conference	Caribbean FCA	Wilton, CT	Kristine Lilly Field	2018	2023	0	0
Constitution Conference	Glastonbury Celtic	Glastonbury, CT	Irish American Home Society	1972	2024	0	0
Constitution Conference	Hermandad Connecticut	Waterbury, CT	Municipal Stadium	2024	2024	1	0
Constitution Conference	KO Elites	Hartford, CT	Annie Fisher School	2019	2024	0	0
Constitution Conference	Wildcat FC	Waterbury, CT	Municipal Stadium	2023	2024	0	0
Delaware River Conference	Alloy Soccer Club	Lancaster, PA	Lancaster Bible College	2022	2023	1	0
Delaware River Conference	German American Kickers	Trenton, NJ	German American Society Field	1962	2025	0	0
Delaware River Conference	Jersey Shore Boca	Bayville, NJ	Veteran's Park	1978	2024	0	0
Delaware River Conference	Lighthouse 1893 SC	Philadelphia, PA	Lighthouse Field	1893	2024	0	0
Delaware River Conference	Medford Strikers	Medford, NJ	Universal Soccer Academy	1983	2025	0	0
Delaware River Conference	Oaklyn United FC	Oaklyn, NJ	Rowan Soccer Complex	2018	2020	0	0
Delaware River Conference	Philadelphia Heritage SC	Philadelphia, PA	Germantown Supersite	2020	2022	1	0
Delaware River Conference	Philadelphia SC	Philadelphia, PA	Northeast High School	1984	2022	0	0
Delaware River Conference	Real Central New Jersey	Trenton, NJ	Mercer County Community College	2020	2020	0	0
Delaware River Conference	Sewell Old Boys	Sewell, NJ	South Philadelphia Supersite	2023	2025	0	0
Delaware River Conference	Vidas United FC	Philadelphia, PA	John Bartram High School	2015	2022	0	0
Delaware River Conference	WC Predators	West Chester, PA	Penn Fusion - Kildare's Turf	2017	2024	1	1
Mayflower Conference	Falcons FC	Waltham, MA	James P. Falzone Field	2024	2024	0	0
Mayflower Conference	Fitchburg FC	Fitchburg, MA	Game On Fitchburg	2024	2024	0	0
Mayflower Conference	Invictus FC	North Shore, MA	Harry Della Russo Stadium	2025	2025	0	0
Mayflower Conference	Praia Kapital	Boston, MA	Ceylon Park	2008	2024	0	0
Mayflower Conference	Project Football	North Shore, MA	Harry Della Russo Stadium	2024	2025	0	0
Mayflower Conference	Scrub Nation	Boston, MA	Pine Banks Park	2018	2025	1	0
Mayflower Conference	Somerville United FC	Somerville, MA	Dilboy Stadium	2026	2026	0	0
Mayflower Conference	South Coast Union	New Bedford, MA	New Bedford Technical High School	2025	2025	1	0
Metropolitan Conference	Central Park Rangers	New York City, NY	Jack McManus Field	1995	2023	0	0
Metropolitan Conference	Doxa SC	New Rochelle, NY	Joseph F. Fosina Field	1962	2020	1	0
Metropolitan Conference	Hoboken FC 1912	Hoboken, NJ	Laurel Hill Park	1912	2022	0	0
Metropolitan Conference	Lansdowne Yonkers FC	Yonkers, NY	Tibbetts Brook Park	1997	2020	2	1
Metropolitan Conference	Leros SC	Central Islip, NY	Susa Orlin & Cohen Sports Complex	2011	2025	0	0
Metropolitan Conference	New York Athletic Club	New Rochelle, NY	Travers Island	1868	2020	0	0
Metropolitan Conference	New York Greek Americans	New York City, NY	Hofstra University	1941	2020	0	1
Metropolitan Conference	New York International	New York City, NY	Jack McManus Field	2020	2025	0	0
Metropolitan Conference	New York Pancyprian-Freedoms	New York City, NY	Belson Stadium	1974	2020	2	0
Metropolitan Conference	Richmond County FC	Staten Island, NY	Owl Hollow Field	2016	2024	0	0
Metropolitan Conference	SC Vistula Garfield	Garfield, NJ	Garfield High School	1952	2023	0	0
Metropolitan Conference	Zum Schneider FC 03	New York City, NY	Jack McManus Field	2003	2020	0	0
Mid-Atlantic Conference
Mid-Atlantic Conference	Baltimore City Academy	Baltimore, MD	TBD	2023	2026	0	0
Mid-Atlantic Conference	Baltimore City F.C.	Baltimore, MD	TBD	2023	2024	0	0
Mid-Atlantic Conference	Chiefs United	Upper Marlboro, MD	TBD	2023	2026	0	0
Mid-Atlantic Conference	Club Petrolero	Arlington, VA	Woodson High School	2023	2026	0	0
Mid-Atlantic Conference	Christos FC	Baltimore, MD	Under Armor Stadium	1997	2024	0	0
Mid-Atlantic Conference	Delmarva Thunder	Delmarva, MD	Seaford Senior High School	2026	2026	0	0
Mid-Atlantic Conference	DMV Rangers	TBD	TBD	2020	2026	0	0
Mid-Atlantic Conference	Germantown City FC	Germantown, MD	TBD	TBD	2026	0	0
Mid-Atlantic Conference	Grove Soccer United	Glen Allen, VA	Deep Run High School	2022	2020	0	0
Mid-Atlantic Conference	Northern Virginia FC	Leesburg, VA	Virginia Revolution Sportsplex	1998	2020	3	2
Mid-Atlantic Conference	Patuxent FA APSL	Great Mills, MD	Chancellors Run Regional Park	2020	2020	0	0
Mid-Atlantic Conference	PW Nova	Prince William, VA	TBD	TBD	2026	0	0
Mid-Atlantic Conference	VA Marauders FC	Fairfax, VA	Woodson HS	2020	2020	0	0
Mid-Atlantic Conference	Wave FC	Virginia Beach, VA	Norfolk Christian School	2019	2020	0	0
Mitten Conference	Alianza FC	Detroit, MI	TBD	2021	2026	0	0
Mitten Conference	Cavaliers United FC	Detroit, MI	TBD	TBD	2026	0	0
Mitten Conference	Drita SC	Detroit, MI	TBD	1990	2026	0	0
Mitten Conference	Hoverla FC	Warren, MI	TBD	2005	2026	0	0
Mitten Conference	Imlay City FC	Imlay City, MI	Yntema Park	2024	2026	0	0
Mitten Conference	Inter Detroit	Detroit, MI	TBD	TBD	2026	0	0
Mitten Conference	Intra United SC	Detroit, MI	TBD	2022	2026	0	0
Mitten Conference	Livonia City FC	Livonia, MI	TBD	TBD	2026	0	0
Mitten Conference	Monroe United	Monroe, MI	TBD	TBD	2026	0	0
Mitten Conference	World Class FC	Auburn Hills, MI	Evolution Sportsplex	TBD	2026	0	0
Terminus Conference	Alliance SC	Jefferson, GA	Empower College & Career Center Stadium	2025	2025	0	0
Terminus Conference	Bel Calcio FC	Atlanta, GA	Maynard H. Jackson High School	2023	2025	0	0
Terminus Conference	Buckhead SC	Atlanta, GA	Agnes Scott College	2019	2025	0	0
Terminus Conference	Georgia United FC	Atlanta, GA	The Best Academy	2024	2026	0	0
Terminus Conference	Majestic SC	Atlanta, GA	Maynard H. Jackson High School	1982	2025	0	0
Terminus Conference	Peachtree FC	Atlanta, GA	Atlanta International School	2020	2025	0	0
Terminus Conference	Prima FC	Atlanta, GA	Ebster Park	2011	2025	0	0
Terminus Conference	SC Gwinnett	Lawrenceville, GA	JM Tull YMCA	2025	2025	0	0
Terminus Conference	Terminus FC	Atlanta, GA	Brook Run Park	1987	2025	0	0
Trinity Conference	AC Arlington FC	Arlington, TX	Scarbourough-Handley Field	2025	2026	0	0
Trinity Conference	Carrollton Old Boys	Carrollton, TX	Coppell Middle School	2025	2026	0	0
Trinity Conference	Foro SC	Little Elm, TX	Jerry R. Walker Stadium	2018	2026	0	0
Trinity Conference	Texas Rage FC	Lucas, TX	Willow Springs Middle School	2024	2026	0	0
Trinity Conference	Texas Coyotes	Fort Worth, TX	Rolling Hills Soccer Complex	2026	2026	0	0

=== Notable Former clubs ===
Club	Location	Conference	Joined	Final season	Conf. titles	League titles	Current status
Boston City FC	Boston, MA	Mayflower	2022	2024	1	0	USL-2
Philadelphia Lone Star FC	Philadelphia, PA	Metropolitan	2020	2021	0	0	UPSL
Steel Pulse FC	Owings Mills, MD	Mid-Atlantic	2020	2021	1	0	MSSL
Scots-American AC	Kearny, NJ	Metropolitan	2021	2023	0	0	GSSL

== List of champions ==
=== League finals ===
Ed.	Season	Champion	Score	Runner-up	Venue	City	Ref.
1	2020–21	Lansdowne Yonkers (1)	2–0	New York Pancyprian	Capelli Sport Complex	Tinton Falls, NJ	
2	2021–22	Northern Virginia (1)	2–0	New York Pancyprian	Capelli Sport Complex	Tinton Falls, NJ	
3	2022–23	Northern Virginia (2)	4–0	Fall River	VA Revolution Sportsplex	Leesburg, VA	
4	2023–24	NY Greek Americans (1)	2–0	Northern Virginia	Lancaster Bible College	Lancaster, PA)	
5	2024–25	WC Predators (1)	5–1	Northern Virginia	Whitehall High School	Whitehall Township, PA	

=== Conference Champions ===
==== Constitution Conference champions ====
Season	Regular season	Playoff Champion	Runner-up	Score
2024–25	Hermandad Connecticut	KO Elites	Hermandad Connecticut	4–0

==== Delaware River Conference champions ====
Season	Regular season	Playoff Champion	Runner-up	Score
2021–22	International New Jersey FC	Salone FC	International New Jersey FC	3–2
2022–23	Philadelphia Heritage SC	Oaklyn United FC	Salone FC	4–1
2023–24	Alloy SC	Philadelphia SC	Oaklyn United FC	1–0
2024–25	WC Predators	WC Predators	Alloy SC	3–0

==== Mayflower Conference champions ====
Season	Regular season	Playoff Champion	Runner-up	Score
2020–21	Connecticut Rush	Mass United Rush FC	Connecticut Rush	4–0
2021–22	Fall River FC	Fall River FC	Ruggles Pro FC	3–1
2022–23	Fall River FC	Fall River FC	Trem Bala FC USA	3–0 FF (Note: Both teams won their respective semifinal matches but a championship final was never played and Fall River FC was declared the Northeast Conference champion.)
2023–24	Fall: Sete Setembro USA; Spring: Boston City FC	Sete Setembro USA	Boston City FC	7–3
2024–25	South Coast Union	South Coast Union	Sete Setembro USA	3–0

==== Metropolitan Conference champions ====
Season	Regular season	Playoff Champion	Runner-up	Score
2020–21	Lansdowne Yonkers FC	New York Pancyprian-Freedoms	Doxa SC	2–1
2021–22	Doxa SC	New York Pancyprian-Freedoms	Zum Schneider FC 03	4–2
2022–23	New York Pancyprian-Freedoms	New York Pancyprian-Freedoms	New York Greek Americans	2–1
2023–24	Lansdowne Yonkers FC	New York Greek Americans	Doxa SC	2–1
2024–25	New York Pancyprian-Freedoms	New York Pancyprian-Freedoms	Lansdowne Yonkers FC	2–1

==== Mid-Atlantic Conference champions ====
Season	Regular season	Playoff Champion	Runner-up	Score
2020–21	Steel Pulse FC	DMV Rangers	Northern Virginia FC	1–1 (5:4 pks)
2021–22	Northern Virginia FC	Northern Virginia FC	Columbia FC	2–1
2022–23	Northern Virginia FC	Northern Virginia FC	N-Lite FC	2–1
2023–24	Northern Virginia FC	Northern Virginia FC	VA Marauders FC	4–3
2024–25	Northern Virginia FC	Northern Virginia FC	Christos FC	3–0

==== Terminus Conference champions ====
Season	Regular season	Playoff Champion	Runner-up	Score
2025–26	Prima FC	Prima FC	Majestic SC	3-3 (4:3 PKs)

== APSL Tier League System ==
Level	American Premier Soccer League							
5	Mayflower Conference; 8 clubs	Constitution Conference; 5 clubs	Metropolitan Conference; 12 clubs			Delaware River Conference; 12 clubs	Mid-Atlantic Conference; 12 clubs	Terminus Conference 9 clubs
6	CASA Select; Liga 1; 6 clubs		Cosmopolitan Soccer League; Division 1; 11 clubs	Garden State Soccer League; Division A 19 clubs	Long Island Soccer Football League; Premier Division; 9 clubs	CASA Select; Liga 1; 21 clubs	Maryland Major Soccer League; Premier Division; 14 clubs	Atlanta District Amateur Soccer League; Premier Division; 12 clubs
7			Cosmopolitan Soccer League; Division 2; 17 clubs	Garden State Soccer League; Division B 18 clubs	Long Island Soccer Football League; Division 1; 8 clubs	CASA Select; Liga 2; 7 clubs		
8			Cosmopolitan Soccer League; Division 3; 11 clubs		Long Island Soccer Football League; Division 2; 7 clubs			
9			Cosmopolitan Soccer League; Division 4; 15 clubs					
