= FC Berlin (Canada/United States) =

- Short name: FCB
- Founded: 2017; 9 years ago
- Stadium: Scarborough Soccer Arena
- Capacity: N/A
- Owners: Santiago Almada; Gabriel Almada
- Head Coach: Santiago Almada
- League: MASL-W (women)
- 2025-2026: MASL-W: 2nd, Great Lakes North Division
- Website: http://www.berlinfa.com/
Home colors	Away colors	Third colors

FC Berlin is a Canadian and American soccer club based in Kitchener, Ontario, Canada. The senior men's team competes in the United Premier Soccer League, and the senior women's team competes in the Major Arena Soccer League Women.

== History ==
Berlin Football Academy logo

The Berlin Football Academy was founded in 2017 in Kitchener, Ontario, Canada as a youth development soccer academy aimed at preparing players for university and professional soccer opportunities. In the first years, the objective was to provide athletes aged 15–19 with a direct pathway to scholarship opportunities in Canada and the United States. The club's name FC Berlin (Football Club Berlin) pays tribute to the old name of the club's hometown, Kitchener, Ontario (and by extension to its large German community), which was previously known as Berlin, and changed its name during the First World War, following a 1916 referendum.

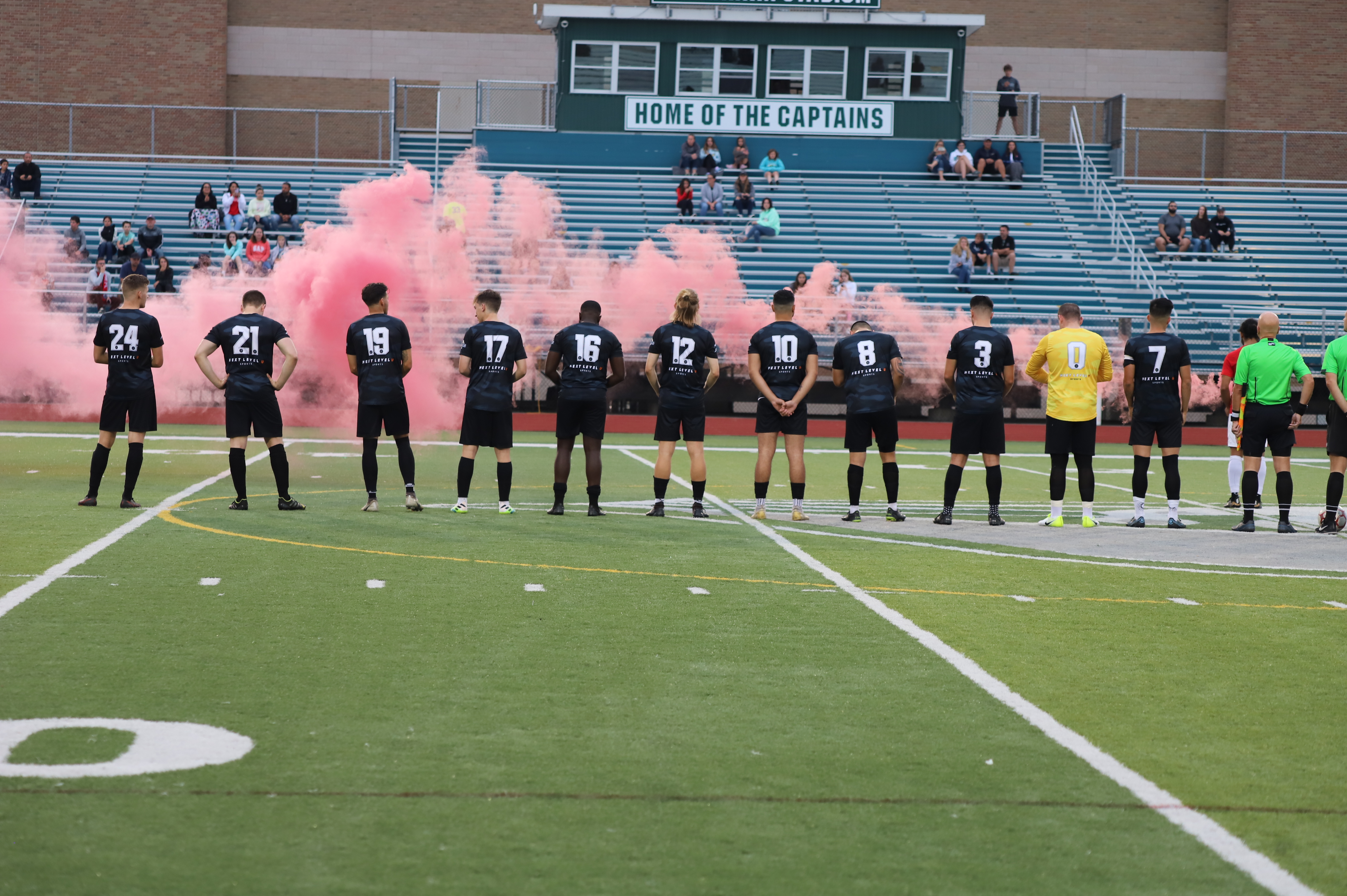
FC Berlin lines up against Detroit Union in their first-ever UPSL match on September 4, 2021.

After joining the Ontario Soccer Association in 2018, the club successfully achieved its first U21 Regional Championship in the Ontario Soccer League, going 12–1–1 with a first-year program. From there, the club significantly invested in its professional development by launching FC Berlin in July 2020, to provide professional development opportunities for Canadian and American players, announcing the team would enter in the American-based United Premier Soccer League in 2021 and would operate out of Buffalo, New York. While the team operates out of the United States to play in the UPSL, they were able to play their first UPSL game in Canada on September 29, 2022, when they took on Chantilly Forever FC, another Canadian club that would operate out of the United States in the league. In January 2021, they announced their intention to join the Women's Premier Soccer League, where they would operate out of Buffalo like the men's team while fielding a roster of all-Canadian players. However, they ultimately joined United Women's Soccer for the 2022 season.

In 2023, FC Berlin's Canadian-based U17 Girls team won the MilkUP Ontario Cup, beating London Alliance by 4–2 in penalty kicks after a 2–2 tie and qualified to the National Championship.

After a challenging 2024 outdoor season marked by more setbacks than successes, FC Berlin chose to take a step back and did not field any teams in U.S. leagues during the Spring or Fall 2025 seasons. In late 2025, however, the club honoured its trailblazer reputation once again. It expanded its horizons even further by assembling a futsal team and joining the Major Arena Soccer League, becoming the first Canadian team to compete in this league.

The inaugural season in MASL-W was a resounding success for FC Berlin. They finished second in the Great Lakes North Division with an 8-0-2 record and qualified for the Nationals, which took place in Detroit, MI on March 20th-22nd, 2026. There, FC Berlin lost in the quarterfinals to eventual finalists RPFC (Dallas).

== Current squad ==
=== Men ===
As of 10 Mar 2026

The FC Berlin men's team is currently on hiatus and expected to return in the 2026 outdoor season.

=== Women ===
As of 10 Mar 2026

Note: Flags indicate national team as defined under FIFA eligibility rules; some limited exceptions apply. Players may hold more than one non-FIFA nationality.

No.	Pos.	Nation	Player
0	GK	CAN	Sarah-Anisha Bradbury
1	GK	CAN	Hunter Jones
3	DF	CAN	Jasmine Burke
4	MF	CAN	Angelika Mihalopulos
5	MF	CAN	Alessia Da Silva
6	FW	CAN	Samantha Murphy
7	MF	CAN	Olivia Rizakos
8	DF	CAN	Bryanna Caldwell
9	FW	CAN	Sophia Lezizidis
10	FW	CAN	Marisa Oliveira

No.	Pos.	Nation	Player
11	DF	GUY	Hope Windebank
12	FW	CAN	Alliyah Rowe
13	DF	CAN	Nicole Mailloux
14	MF	CAN	Maeva Lichtensteiger
16	DF	GUY	Kristen Bettencourt
17	MF	CAN	Violet Hipkin
18	MF	CAN	Rebecca Draeger
20	FW	CAN	Raquelle Mitchell
22	MF	CAN	April Syme
44	MF	GUY	Brianne Desa
99	GK	JAM	Yazmeen Jamieson

== Staff ==
As of 01 Mar 2026

Position	Name
President	(Argentina) Gabriel Almada
Technical Director	(Argentina) Santiago Almada
Head Coach	(Argentina) Santiago Almada
Assistant Coach	(Canada) Greg Jespersen
Assistant Coach	(Canada) Michael Marcoccia
Athletic Trainer	(Canada) Evan Dick
Visual Media Director	(Argentina) Juan Almada

== Seasons ==
=== Men ===
Season	League	Division	Teams	Record	Rank	Playoffs	Ref
2021 Fall	United Premier Soccer League	Midwest East Division	8	4–2–4	5th	did not qualify	
2022 Spring	United Premier Soccer League	Western NY Division	10	6–1–3	3rd	Conference Semi-finals	
2022 Fall	United Premier Soccer League	Midwest East Division	9	4–2–2	5th	did not qualify	
2023 Spring	United Premier Soccer League	Western NY Division	12	6–1–4	6th	Conference Quarter-finals	
2023 Fall	United Premier Soccer League	Midwest East Division	6	1–4–5	6th	did not qualify	
2024 Spring	United Premier Soccer League	Western NY Division	10	3–2–5	6th	Conference Semi-finals	

=== Women ===
Season	League	Division	Teams	Record	Rank	Playoffs	Ref
2022	United Women's Soccer	Penn-NY Division	5	0–3–7	4th	did not qualify	
2022 Spring	United Premier Soccer League	Western NY Division	4	2–0–4	3rd	did not qualify	
2023	United Women's Soccer	East Division	17	0–0–6	17th	did not qualify	
2024	United Women's Soccer	East Division	18	1–0–7	15th	did not qualify	
2025	Major Arena Soccer League	Great Lakes North Division	4	8-0-2	2nd	Nationals quarterfinals	

== Notable former players ==
The following players have either played at the professional or international level, either before or after playing for the FC Berlin team:

=== Men ===
- (Ukraine) Svyatik Artemenko
- (Canada) Wesley Cain
- (Canada) (Colombia) Nicolás Galvis
- (Canada) Jace Kotsopoulos
- (Canada) Tomasz Skublak

=== Women ===
- (Guyana) Brianne Desa
- (Jamaica) Yazmeen Jamieson
