= Buccaneer Arena =

Defunct arena in Urbandale, Iowa

Coordinates: 41°36′56″N 93°43′4″W

- The Madhouse on Hickman
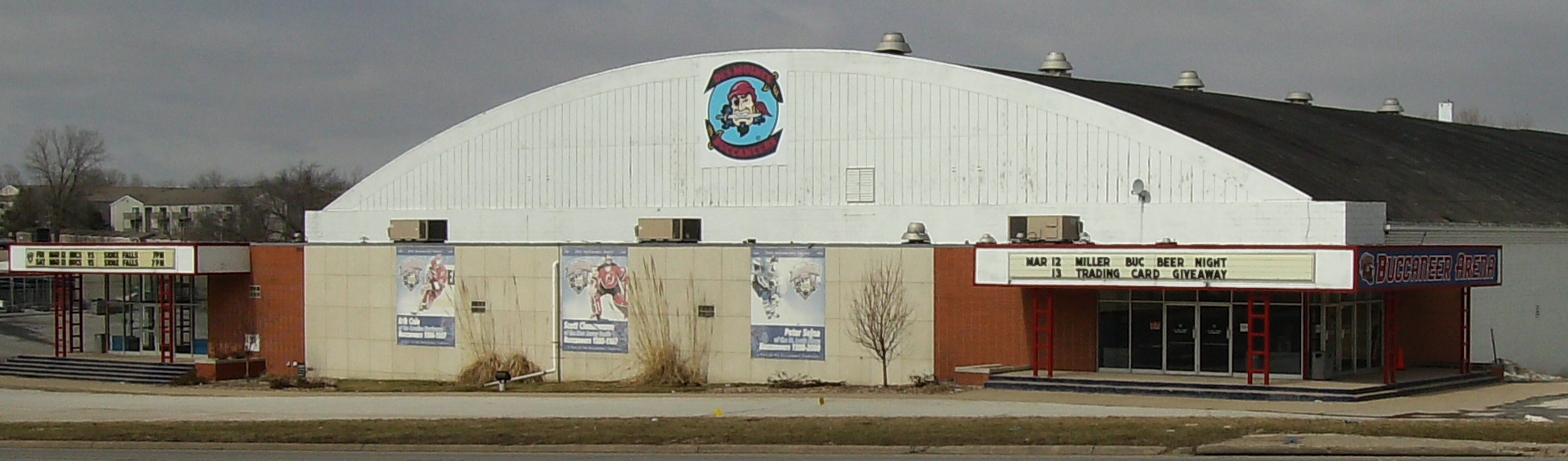

- Location within Iowa Location within the United States
- Former names: Des Moines Ice Arena (1961–1973); Metro Ice Sports Arena (1973–2004); 95-KGGO Arena (2005–2008)
- Location: 7201 Hickman Road; Urbandale, Iowa 50322
- Owner: Orchard View Sports & Entertainment, LLC
- Operator: Orchard View Sports & Entertainment, LLC
- Capacity: 3,461, standing room 700
- Surface: Ice

Construction
- Groundbreaking: 1960
- Opened: November 12, 1961
- Renovated: 2008
- Closed: April 23, 2026

Tenants
- Des Moines Oak Leafs/Capitols (IHL) (1963–1975); Des Moines Buccaneers (USHL) (1980–2024); Iowa Demon Hawks (MASL2) (2023–2026)

Buccaneer Arena is a defunct multi-purpose arena in Urbandale, Iowa. It was home to the Des Moines Buccaneers ice hockey team in the United States Hockey League from 1980 to 2024. Before the Buccaneers began playing in 1980, the International Hockey League's Des Moines Capitols franchise played here.

== Building history ==
The arena opened on November 12, 1961 as the Des Moines Ice Arena. It was later renamed the Metro Ice Sports Arena before becoming Buccaneer Arena in mid-2004. On September 22, 2005, Buccaneer Arena was renamed 95-KGGO Arena after Citadel Broadcasting, owners of radio station KGGO, purchased the naming rights to the arena. It is nicknamed the "Madhouse on Hickman" for its location on Hickman Road. In 2008, the arena changed its name back to Buccaneer Arena. In 2020, the arena's roof was damaged during the August 2020 Midwest derecho.

On April 23, 2026, Des Moines Buccaneers president Eric Grundfast announced the Buccaneer Arena would close, citing the age and the increased cost to maintain the arena.

== Tenants ==
The arena served as home ice for the Des Moines Buccaneers' ten championship seasons in the 1990s: Anderson Cup regular season champions in 1993–94, 1994–95, 1997–98, 1998–99; Clark Cup playoff champions in 1992, 1995, 1999, 2006; and Gold Cup Junior A champions in 1992, 1995, 1998. Following the damage to the roof in 2020, the team was forced to start the 2020–21 season at Wells Fargo Arena in downtown Des Moines. In November 2020, the team announced it would be replacing the old arena as part of a project to turn the former Younkers department store location in Merle Hay Mall into a new 3,500-seat, $59 million arena. Buccaneer Arena completed repairs in January 2021, and plans to build the new hockey arena within the mall would fall through in July of 2024 due to the team's lease expiring. Mall officials have also stated they will continue to build the new venue and are open to renegotiating their lease with the team as well.

In 2023, MASL2's Iowa Demon Hawks semi-professional indoor soccer team began playing home games at the arena.

In August 2024, the Buccaneers announced they would temporarily move to the MidAmerican Energy Co. Recplex located in West Des Moines for the 2024-25 USHL season due to a mechanical issue that would delay the arena's ability to make ice prior to the team's season-opening game the following month. In the same statement, team officials also proclaimed they would continue to make the arena operational again until "it is no longer sustainable to do."

In 2007, the arena hosted the College Hockey America championship tournament. The arena has also hosted mixed martial arts.
