= Veterans Memorial Stadium (Lawrence, Massachusetts) =

Multisports venue in Lawrence, Massachusetts

Coordinates: 42.689568°N 71.146568°W

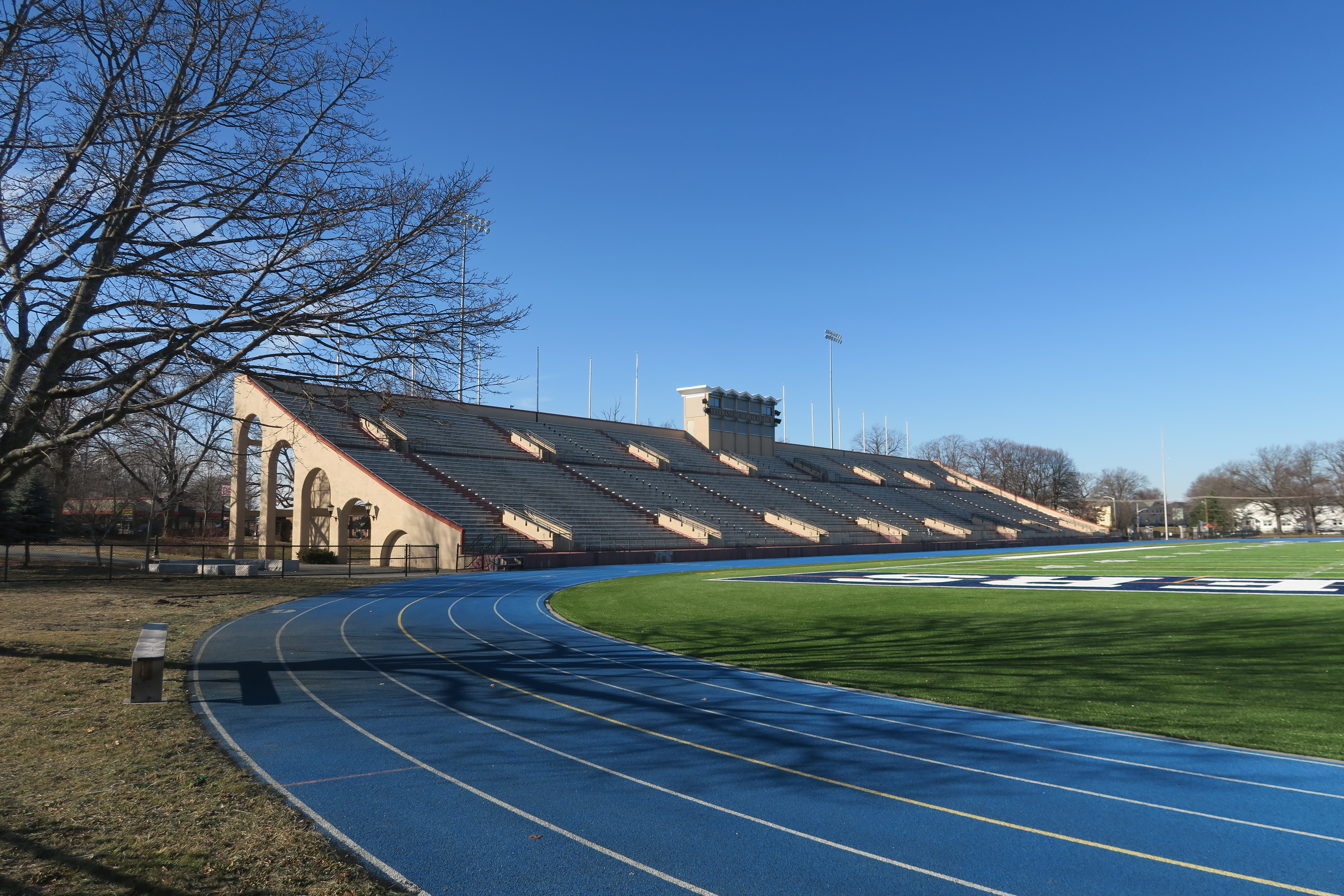
Veterans Memorial Stadium

Veterans Memorial Stadium is a 9,000 seat stadium in Lawrence, Massachusetts. The stadium is located adjacent to the Lawrence High School. The venue opened in 1927 and was renovated in 2006. It currently serves as the home field for the Lawrence High School Lancers and the Central Catholic High School Raiders sports teams including football, soccer, lacrosse, and outdoor track and field.

The stadium is also home to the semi-pro football team Merrimack Valley Maulers of the New England Football League.

The Stadium has hosted national drum corps competition every summer since its renovation. It also hosts the New England Scholastic Band Association Finals for marching band every year.

It was considered as a possible new location for the New Hampshire Phantoms minor league soccer club of the USL Second Division; The club eventually decided to stay in New Hampshire.
