= Chantilly Forever FC =

Canadian and American soccer club

- Founded: 2013; 12 years ago
- Stadium: Coyer Field @ Buffalo State, Buffalo, New York
- Capacity: 2,500
- Head coach: Shabazz Perrin
- League: United Premier Soccer League
- 2022: 8th, Midwest East
- Website: https://www.chantillyforeverfc.com/
Home colours	Away colours

Chantilly Forever FC is a Canadian and American soccer club based in Hamilton, Ontario, Canada, and Buffalo, New York, United States. The senior men's team competes in United Premier Soccer League.

== History ==
Chantilly Forever is the only Ontario Soccer Association sanctioned soccer academy in Hamilton, Ontario. They received a National Canada Club License as a provincial level 1 holder through the Canada Soccer Association. In 2022, it was announced that they would join the US-based semi-pro United Premier Soccer League.

== Staff ==
Position	Nationality	Name
Director of operations	Canada	David Campos
Head coach	Canada	Shabazz Perrin
Assistant coach	Canada	Dexter Hamilton
Goalkeeper coach	Canada	Claudio Perri
Team manager	Canada	Donna Chaney

== Seasons ==
Season	League	Division	Teams	Record	Rank	Playoffs	Ref
2022 Fall	United Premier Soccer League	Midwest East Division	9	1–1–6	8th	did not qualify	
2023 Spring	United Premier Soccer League	Western NY Division	12	1–4–6	10th	did not qualify	
2024 Spring	United Premier Soccer League	Western NY Division	10	3–1–6	7th	did not qualify	
