= National Premier Soccer League records and statistics =

The following is a compilation of notable records and statistics for teams and players in and seasons of National Premier Soccer League n the United States.

== Regular season ==
=== All-Time Championship Game Performance ===
Team	Championships	Years	Runners-up	Years
(California) Sonoma County Sol	1	2009	3	2005, 2013, 2016
Arizona Sahuaros	1	2003	1	2004
Utah Salt Ratz	1	2004	1	2003
(Michigan) Detroit Arsenal	1	2005	—	—
(California) Sacramento Knights	1	2006	—	—
Southern California Fusion	1	2007	—	—
Pennsylvania Stoners	1	2008	—	—
(California) Sacramento Gold	1	2010	—	—
(Florida) Jacksonville United	1	2011	—	—
(Pennsylvania) FC Sonic	1	2012	—	—
(Virginia) RVA Football Club	1	2013	—	—
(New Jersey) New York Red Bulls U-23	1	2014	—	—
(New York (state)) New York Cosmos B	1	2015	—	—
(Ohio) AFC Cleveland	1	2016	—	—
(Connecticut) Elm City Express	1	2017	—	—
(Tennessee) Chattanooga FC	—	—	4	2010, 2012, 2014, 2015
(Wisconsin) Princeton 56ers	—	—	1	2006
(New York (state)) Queen City FC	—	—	1	2007
(Minnesota) St. Paul Twin Stars	—	—	1	2008
(Pennsylvania) Erie Admirals SC	—	—	1	2009
(California) Hollywood United Hitmen	—	—	1	2011
(Texas) Midland-Odessa FC	—	—	1	2017

Former clubs

=== All-Time Regular Season Records ===
Through completion of 2013 regular season.

Pts Rank	Club	Seasons	GP	W	L	T	GF	GA	GD	Pts	Pts Per Game	1st	2nd	3rd	4th
Pts Rank	Club	Seasons	GP	W	L	T	GF	GA	GD	Pts	Pts Per Game	Finishing Positions.			
1	Sonoma County Sol*	10	138	72	34	23	229	125	114	262	1.90	4	2	2	-
2	Madison 56ers*	9	90	55	16	13	157	78	79	186	2.07	4	-	5	-
3	Milwaukee Bavarians*	8	82	48	16	12	141	79	62	150	1.83	1	4	-	3
4	Erie Admirals S.C.	5	58	41	11	6	136	59	78	133	2.29	3	1	1	-
5	Sacramento Knights*	4	67	39	16	12	76	40	36	129	1.93	2	1	-	-
6	Albuquerque Asylum*	5	76	38	24	14	63	48	15	128	1.68	1	1	2	-
7	Minnesota Twin Stars*	9	89	34	23	26	122	146	-24	125	1.40	2	-	3	3
8	Chico Rooks*	4	69	37	22	10	117	84	33	121	1.75	1	1	1	-
9	FC Lehigh Valley United	4	48	38	4	6	106	30	76	118	2.46	2	2	-	-
10	Brooklyn Italians	4	46	34	5	7	113	46	67	107	2.33	2	2	-	-
11	New York Red Bulls NPSL	4	46	32	6	8	108	38	70	102	2.22	2	1	1	-
12	Sacramento Gold	4	50	28	10	12	131	90	41	93	1.86	1	2	1	-
13	Chattanooga FC	5	46	27	11	8	86	37	49	92	2.00	2	-	2	-
14	FC Buffalo	5	58	28	11	19	98	80	18	91	1.57	-	2	1	-
15	San Diego Flash	3	42	28	7	7	126	47	79	91	2.17	2	1	-	-
16	Salinas Valley Samba*	6	89	26	40	14	74	84	-10	89	1.00	-	-	-	3
17	Real San Jose*	7	85	20	25	31	101	123	-22	88	1.04	-	1	2	1
18	New York Athletic Club*	6	62	20	20	12	81	88	-7	85	1.37	-	1	2	1
19	Morris County Colonials*	6	61	20	16	16	96	108	-12	71	1.16	-	1	-	2
20	Chicago Fire NPSL*	5	45	17	12	10	66	35	31	70	1.56	-	3	-	-
21	Orange County Pateadores	3	42	21	6	15	87	72	12	69	1.64	-	1	1	1
22	Rocket City United*	6	54	19	15	20	78	69	9	69	1.28	1	-	3	-
23	Utah Salt Ratz	2	31	23	8	0	88	35	53	69	2.23	1	-	-	1
24	Quad City Eagles	3	36	20	9	7	85	48	37	69	1.92	1	1	1	-
25	FC Hasental	3	42	20	8	14	95	71	24	68	1.62	1	-	1	-
26	Arizona Sahuaros*	3	39	22	15	2	57	40	17	68	1.74	-	1	2	-
27	FC Reading Revolution	4	46	20	17	9	83	93	-10	65	1.41	-	-	1	2
28	Bay Area Ambassadors	4	50	20	12	18	93	107	-14	65	1.30	1	-	2	1
29	San Diego iCon FC	4	52	18	10	24	103	112	-9	64	1.23	-	-	-	3
30	Atlanta Silverbacks Reserves*	5	44	19	15	10	54	57	-3	64	1.45	1	2	-	1
31	Southern California Fusion*	2	34	19	10	5				62	1.82	1	1	-	-
32	FC Santa Clarita	3	42	18	6	18	92	98	-6	60	1.43	-	1	1	-
33	San Diego Pumitas*	3	52	15	20	17	32	34	-2	59	1.13	-	-	1	1
34	Long Island Academy*	4	39	10	14	6	25	52	-17	56	1.44	1	1	1	-
35	Georgia Revolution	3	28	16	6	6	72	41	31	54	1.93	1	2	-	-
36	Detroit City FC	2	24	16	6	2	61	18	43	54	2.25	1	1	-	-
37	Jacksonville United	3	28	15	4	9	57	42	15	49	1.75	2	-	-	1
38	Detroit Arsenal*	2	20	15	2	3	42	5	37	48	2.40	1	1	-	-
39	Santa Cruz County Breakers*	2	23	7	4	3				44	1.91	-	1	1	-
40	Boston Aztec*	3	28	8	7	3	19	12	17	43	1.54	1	1	-	1
41	Las Vegas Strikers*	4	69	10	47	12	66	131	-65	42	0.61	-	-	-	-
42	Pennsylvania Stoners*	2	20	5	4	1	17	13	4	41	2.05	1	-	1	-
43	San Jose Frogs*	1	20	12	4	4	0	0		40	2.00	-	1	-	-
44	Clarkstown SC Eagles	2	22	12	4	6	51	23	28	40	1.82	-	-	2	-
45	Greater Binghamton FC	2	24	11	5	8	49	40	9	38	1.58	1	-	-	1
46	Knoxville Force	3	30	10	6	14	31	46	-15	36	1.20	-	-	-	-
47	Pocono Snow	5	58	7	21	30	57	134	-77	34	0.59	-	-	-	-
48	Seacoast United Phantoms	3	34	9	7	18	40	72	-32	34	1.00	-	1	-	-
49	Hollywood United Hitmen	1	14	11	1	2	54	14	40	34	2.43	1	-	-	-
50	Denver Kickers*	2	32	9	16	7				34	1.06	-	-	-	1
51	AC Crusaders	2	22	10	3	9	45	42	3	33	1.50	-	-	-	2
52	Tulsa Athletics	1	12	10	2	0	44	9	35	32	2.67	1	-	-	-
53	AFC Cleveland	2	24	7	10	7	44	38	6	31	1.29	-	-	1	1
54	Junior Lone Star FC	2	23	10	1	12	41	47	-6	31	1.35	-	-	-	1
55	Indios USA*	1	14	9	1	4				31	2.21	-	1	-	-
56	Queen City FC*	2	20	7	2	1				29	1.45	1	-	1	-
57	Atlantic City Diablos*	2	20	5	1	4				28	1.40	-	1	-	-
58	Myrtle Beach FC	2	18	8	1	9	30	36	-6	25	1.39	-	1	1	-
59	Rhode Island Reds FC	2	23	6	6	11	27	43	-16	24	1.04	-	-	-	1
60	Seacoast United Mariners	2	24	5	7	12	29	47	-18	22	0.92	-	-	-	1
61	NorCal Lamorinda United SC	1	12	7	4	1	24	14	10	22	1.83	-	1	-	-
62	Liverpool Warriors	1	12	6	4	2	36	12	24	22	1.83	-	1	-	-
63	Houston Hurricanes FC	2	21	6	4	11	31	52	-21	22	1.05	1	-	-	1
64	Northern Nevada Aces	2	31	6	22	3	32	101	-69	21	0.68	-	-	-	1
65	Phoenix Banat Storm*	1	20	6	12	2				20	1.00	-	-	-	-
66	Redwood City Ruckus*	1	20	6	12	2				20	1.00	-	-	-	1
67	Mass United	2	23	6	2	15	36	53	-17	20	0.87	-	-	-	-
68	RVA Football Club	1	8	6	2	0	23	8	15	20	2.50	1	-	-	-
69	Buxmont Torch FC	3	35	4	6	25	43	90	-47	18	0.51	-	-	-	-
70	Pensacola City FC	1	10	5	3	2	16	7	9	18	1.80	-	1	-	-
71	Minnesota Kings	2	22	5	8	9	30	59	-29	18	0.82	-	-	-	-
72	Hershey FC	1	12	5	2	5	20	27	-7	17	1.42	-	-	-	-
73	New Hampshire Mountaineers	1	12	5	5	2	21	15	6	17	1.42	-	-	1	-
74	Pumas FC	2	16	5	9	2	28	38	-10	17	1.06	-	-	-	2
75	Minnesota NSC United*	2	19	5	12	2	15	20	-5	17	0.89	-	-	-	1
76	San Diego United*	1	8	5	2	1				16	2.00	1	-	-	-
77	Maine Sting*	2	17	3	2	3	14	15	-1	16	0.94	-	-	1	1
78	Eau Claire Aris FC	5	53	3	20	30	61	214	-153	15	0.28	-	-	-	1
79	New Orleans Jesters	1	10	4	2	4	15	15	0	14	1.40	-	-	-	1
80	FC Tulsa	1	8	4	2	2	16	12	4	14	1.75	-	1	-	-
81	DC United Academy U23	1	8	4	1	3	17	15	2	13	1.63	-	-	1	-
82	San Francisco Stompers	2	25	3	4	18	21	75	-54	13	0.52	-	-	-	-
83	Tucson Tiburons	1	15	4	10	1	16	36	-20	13	0.87	-	-	-	-
84	Maryland United*	1	9							13	1.44	-	-	1	-
85	Southern Oregon Fuego	2	21	4	16	1	31	68	-37	13	0.62	-	-	-	1
86	Indianapolis Braves*	1	10	4	6	0				12	1.20	-	-	-	1
87	CD Aguiluchos USA	1	12	3	3	6	19	23	-4	12	1.00	-	-	-	1
88	Performance FC Phoenix*	1	8	3	3	2				11	1.38	-	1	-	-
89	Lancaster Inferno*	1	8							11	1.38	-	-	-	1
90	Miami United FC	1	8	3	2	3	11	14	-3	11	1.38	-	-	1	-
91	FC New York	1	14	2	4	8	10	28	-18	10	0.71	-	-	-	-
92	North Coast Tsunami	1	13	3	1	9	11	30	-19	10	0.77	-	-	-	-
93	TSC Maryland Red Devils	1	12	3	8	1	14	29	-15	10	0.83	-	-	-	-
94	Tampa Marauders	1	8	2	3	3	5	8	-3	9	1.13	-	-	-	1
95	Michigan Stars FC	1	12	2	2	8	10	34	-24	8	0.67	-	-	-	-
96	Chesterfield United FC	1	8	2	2	4	12	19	-7	8	1.00	-	-	-	1
97	Regals SCA	1	12	2	1	9	15	50	-35	7	0.58	-	-	1	-
98	New Jersey Blaze	2	24	2	10	12	23	70	-47	7	0.29	-	-	-	-
99	Las Vegas Stallions	1	14	2	1	11	16	57	-41	7	0.50	-	-	-	-
100	Grand Rapids Alliance*	2	20	2	17	1	10	36	-26	7	0.35	-	-	-	-
101	Mississippi Storm	2	20	2	1	17	27	67	-40	7	0.35	-	-	-	-
102	Saturn FC	1	8	2	6	0	12	22	-10	6	0.75	-	-	-	-
103	Colorado Crimson*	1	12	1	8	3				6	0.50	-	-	-	-
104	Boston Tea Men	1	12	1	8	3	13	31	-18	6	0.50	-	-	-	-
105	FC New Orleans	1	2	1	1	0	7	4	3	4	2.00	-	1	-	-
106	Zanesville Athletic FC	1	12	1	1	10	12	32	-20	4	0.33	-	-	-	-
107	Texas South Devils	1	2	1	0	1	7	2	5	3	1.50	-	-	1	-
108	CASL Elite	1	8	0	2	6	6	24	-18	2	0.25	-	-	-	-
109	FC Indiana*	2	18	2	15	1	9	21	-12	1	0.06	-	-	-	-
110	Cape Coral Hurricanes	1	8	0	1	7	3	22	-19	1	0.13	-	-	-	-
111	Phoenix Monsoon	1	12	0	0	12	6	59	-53	0	0.00	-	-	-	-
112	Idaho Wolves	1	15	0	15	0	8	61	-53	0	0.00	-	-	-	-
113	Real Shore FC*	1	10	0	10	0				0	0.00	-	-	-	-
114	Charm City	1	10	3	7	0	12	16	-4	0	0.00	-	-	-	-
115	Alabama Spirit**	0	0	-	-	-	--	-	-	0	0.00	-	-	-	-

- * Missing GF/GA/GD for 2006 & 2007 Seasons, Missing W/L/T & GF/GA/GD for 2008 Season with the exception of Atlanta Silverbacks Reserves, Performance FC Phoenix, Rocket City United, San Diego United, Arizona Sahuaros and Albuquerque Asylum for which W/L/T is included for 2008 Season but GF/GA/GD is missing.
- ** Alabama Spirit though scheduled to complete in 2008 never played a game

=== Best Regular Season Record by Year ===
Year	Team	Conference	Record	Points	Avg Points
2003	Utah Salt Ratz	N/A	12-0-3	36	2.4
2004	Chico Rooks	N/A	13-1-2	40	2.5
2005	Detroit Arsenal*	Midwest	8-2-0	26	2.6
2006	Princeton 56ers *	Midwest	8-2-0	26	2.6
2007	Princeton 56ers *	Midwest	8-1-1	25	2.5
2008	Pennsylvania Stoners	Northeast-Keystone	8-1-1	25	2.5
2009	Erie Admirals SC *	Northeast-Keystone	9-1-0	28	2.8
2010	FC Sonic Lehigh Valley	Northeast-Keystone	10-1-1	31	2.58
2010	New York Red Bulls NPSL	Northeast-Keystone	10-1-1	31	2.58
2011	Erie Admirals SC *	Northeast-Keystone	10-1-1	31	2.58
2012	San Diego Flash	West-Southern	11-2-1	35	2.5
2013	Detroit City FC	Midwest-Great Lakes	11-1-0	34	2.83

Best regular season record determined by average points per game since the number of games played varies
* Team did not score the most overall points during the year but had best average points per game

=== All-Time Regular Season Division / Conference Championships ===
Year	Divisions Champions					
2003	Utah Salt Ratz; Overall					
2004	Chico Rooks; Overall					
2005	Sacramento Knights; West Division	Detroit Arsenal; Midwest Division				
2006	Sacramento Knights; Northwest Division	Princeton 56ers Midwest Division	Albuquerque Asylum; Southwest Division			
2007	Sonoma County Sol; Northwest Division	Princeton 56ers Midwest Division	Southern California Fusion; Southwest Division	Queen City FC; Northeast Division		
2008	Sonoma County Sol; Northwest Division	St. Paul Twin Stars; Midwest Division	San Diego United; Southwest Division	Pennsylvania Stoners; North Division	Long Island Academy; Mid-Atlantic Division	Atlanta FC; Southeast Division
2009	Sonoma County Sol; Western Division	St. Paul Twin Stars; Midwest Division		Erie Admirals SC; Eastern Keystone Division	Boston Aztec; Eastern Atlantic Division	Rocket City United; Southeast Division
2010	Sacramento Gold; Northwest Division	Madison 56ers Midwest Division		FC Sonic Lehigh Valley; Northeast Keystone Division	New York Red Bull NPSL; Northeast Atlantic Division	Chattanooga FC; Southeast Division
2011	Hollywood United Hitmen; West Div - Flight Northwest	Milwaukee Bavarians; Midwest Division	San Diego Flash; West Div - Flight Southwest	Erie Admirals SC; Northeast Div - Keystone Conf	Brooklyn Italians; Northeast Div - Atlantic Conf	Jacksonville United; Southeast Division
2012	Bay Area Ambassadors; West Div - Northern Conf	Madison 56ers Midwest Div - Central Conf	San Diego Flash; West Div - Southern Conf	FC Sonic Lehigh Valley; Northeast Div - Keystone Conf	New York Red Bulls NPSL; Northeast Div - Atlantic Conf	Georgia Revolution; South Div - Southeast Conf-East
2012	Chattanooga FC; South Div - Southeast Conf-West	Galveston Pirate SC; South Div - South Central Conf	Erie Admirals SC; Midwest Div - Great Lakes Conf			
2013	Sonoma County Sol; West Reg - Golden Gate Div	Quad City Eagles; Midwest Reg - Central Div	FC Hasental; West Reg - Southern Div	Greater Binghamton FC; Northeast Reg - Keystone Conf	Brooklyn Italians; Northeast Reg - Atlantic Div	Jacksonville United; South Reg - Sunshine Div
2013	Chattanooga FC; South Reg - Southeast Div	Tulsa Athletics; South Reg - South Central Conf	Detroit City FC; Midwest Reg - Great Lakes Div	RVA Football Club; South Reg - Mid-Atlantic Conf		

=== All-Time Regular Season Attendance Bests ===
Attendance	Date	Location	Match
11,171	June 1, 2024	Navy-Marine Corps Memorial Stadium, Annapolis, MD	DMV Elite FC v Annapolis Blues FC
9,038	June 29, 2024	Navy-Marine Corps Memorial Stadium, Annapolis, MD	Virginia Beach City FC v Annapolis Blues FC
8,861	June 16, 2024	Navy-Marine Corps Memorial Stadium, Annapolis, MD	FC Frederick v Annapolis Blues FC
8,616	July 6, 2024	Navy-Marine Corps Memorial Stadium, Annapolis, MD	Grove United v Annapolis Blues FC
8,459	June 7, 2024	Navy-Marine Corps Memorial Stadium, Annapolis, MD	Alexandria Rough Diamonds v Annapolis Blues FC
8,368	June 3, 2023	Navy-Marine Corps Memorial Stadium, Annapolis, MD	FC Frederick v Annapolis Blues FC
8,177	July 1, 2023	Navy-Marine Corps Memorial Stadium, Annapolis, MD	Northern Virginia FC v Annapolis Blues FC
7,665	June 10, 2023	Navy-Marine Corps Memorial Stadium, Annapolis, MD	Virginia Beach City FC v Annapolis Blues FC
7,410	May 20, 2016	Keyworth Stadium, Hamtramck, MI	Detroit City FC v AFC Ann Arbor
7,356	July 9, 2023	Navy-Marine Corps Memorial Stadium, Annapolis, MD	Alexandria Reds FC v Annapolis Blues FC
7,208	June 18, 2023	Navy-Marine Corps Memorial Stadium, Annapolis, MD	Grove City FC v Annapolis Blues FC
6,854	Jul 8, 2016	Houseman Field, Grand Rapids, MI	Grand Rapids FC v AFC Ann Arbor
6,384	Jul 15, 2016	Keyworth Stadium, Hamtramck, MI	Detroit City FC v Michigan Stars FC
6,122	Jun 10, 2016	Houseman Field, Grand Rapids, MI	Grand Rapids FC v Detroit City FC
5,593	May 21, 2016	Finley Stadium, Chattanooga, TN	Chattanooga FC v Nashville FC
5,422	Jul 11, 2023	Lubbock Cooper Pirate Stadium, Lubbock, TX	Lubbock Matadors v San Antonio Corinthians FC
5,326	Jul 2, 2016	Finley Stadium, Chattanooga, TN	Chattanooga FC v New Orleans Jesters

== U.S. Open Cup ==
=== U.S. Open Cup Performance by Year ===
Through completion of 2013 regular season.

Year	Team	Advanced to		Ref.
Year	Team	1st Round	2nd Round	Ref.
2003	1	Chico Rooks *		
2004	2	Chico Rooks	Sacramento Knights	
2005	2	Sonoma County Sol	Salinas Valley Samba	
2006	2		Arizona Sahuaros †, Sonoma County Sol	
2007	2	Indios USA ‡	Milwaukee Bavarians	
2008	1	Arizona Sahuaros †		
2009	4	Arizona Sahuaros †, Atlanta FC, Milwaukee Bavarians ♣	Sonoma County Sol	
2010	4	Bay Area Ambassadors, Brooklyn Italians ¶, Sonoma County Sol	Arizona Sahuaros †	
2011	4	Brooklyn Italians, Chattanooga FC, Hollywood United Hitmen	Madison 56ers	
2012	6	FC Sonic Lehigh Valley, Fullerton Rangers, Milwaukee Bavarians	Brooklyn Italians, Georgia Revolution, Jacksonville United	
2013	8	Brooklyn Italians, Chattanooga FC, FC Hasental, FC Sonic Lehigh Valley, Madison 56ers, New York Red Bulls NPSL, Sacramento Gold	Georgia Revolution	

- Automatic entries granted to NPSL teams starting with 2011 tournament
- * Chico Rooks qualified for 2003 tournament before the MPSL officially began play
- † Arizona Sahuaros competed in the USASA from 2005 thru 2007 as well as 2009 and 2010 seasons but were officially on hiatus from the NPSL due to the lack of a Southwest Conference''
- ‡ Indois USA joined the NPSL for the 2007 season and qualified for the U.S. Open Cup before competing within the NPSL
- ♣ Milwaukee Bavarians completed in 2009 USASA while on hiatus from NPSL
- ¶ Brooklyn Italians joined the NPSL for the 2010 season and qualified for the U.S. Open Cup before competing within the NPSL

=== All-Time U.S. Open Cup Appearances and Performance ===
Team	Appearances	Advanced to	
Team	Appearances	1st Round	2nd Round
(California) Sonoma County Sol	4	2	2
Arizona Sahuaros	2	2	—
(New York (state)) Brooklyn Italians	4	3	1
(Wisconsin) Milwaukee Bavarians	3	2	1
(Georgia (U.S. state)) Georgia Revolution	2	—	2
(Wisconsin) Madison 56ers	2	1	1
(California) Chico Rooks	2	2	—
(Tennessee) Chattanooga FC	2	2	—
(Pennsylvania) FC Lehigh Valley United Sonic	2	2	—
(California) Sacramento Knights	1	—	1
(California) Salinas Valley Samba	1	—	1
(Florida) Jacksonville United	1	—	1
(Texas) Indios USA	1	1	—
(Georgia (country)) Atlanta FC *	1	1	—
(California) Bay Area Ambassadors	1	1	—
(California) Hollywood United Hitmen	1	1	—
(California) Fullerton Rangers *	1	1	—
(California) FC Hasental	1	1	—
(New Jersey) New York Red Bulls NPSL	1	1	—
(California) Sacramento Gold	1	1	—

Former clubs On Hiatus

- *Atlanta FC now known as Atlanta Silverbacks Reserves and Fullerton Rangers now known as Orange County Pateadores

== See also ==
- Major League Soccer records and statistics
- North American Soccer League records and statistics
