= List of National Premier Soccer League teams =

Below is a list of all the teams that ever have ever played, or will play, in the Men's Premier Soccer League (MPSL) or National Premier Soccer League (NPSL).

(Current as of 2023 season)

Name	Year entered	Year exited
865 Alliance	2023	present
AC Crusaders	2011	2012
Academica SC	2018	2022
AFC Ann Arbor	2016	2019
AFC Cleveland	2012	2017
AFC Mobile	2020	2022
Akron City FC	2021	2024
Alabama Spirit (Provisional)	2008	2008
Alexandria Reds	2022	present
Ambassadors FC Ohio	2025	present
American Soccer Club New York	2025	present
Annapolis Blues FC	2023	2024
Appalachian FC	2021	present
Apotheos FC	2022	2024
Arkansas Wolves FC	2021	present
A.S. Los Angeles	2019	2020
Albion SC Pros/ASC San Diego	2016	2021
Asheville City SC	2016	2019
Albuquerque Asylum	2004	2008
Arizona Sahuaros	2003	2008
ASA Charge	2014	2016
Atlanta FC/Atlanta Silverbacks Reserves/Atlanta Silverbacks FC/Atlanta SC	2008	2019
Atlantic City Diablos	2007	2008
Atlantic City FC	2018	2024
Austin United FC	2020	2024
Bay Area Ambassadors	2009	2012
BCS Clash	2014	2014
Beaches FC/Palm Beach United	2017	2018
Birmingham Hammers	2016	2017
Boca Raton FC	2017	2021
Boston Aztec	2007	2009
Boston City FC	2016	2021
Boston Tea Men	2010	2010
Brooklyn Italians	2010	2019
Buffalo City FC	2009	2009
Buffalo Stallions	2025	present
Burlington United FC	2025	present
Buxmont Torch FC/Torch FC	2011	present
California Odyssey SC	2023	present
Cape Coral Hurricanes	2013	2014
Carolina RailHawks U23s/Carolina RailHawks NPSL	2014	2016
Carpathia FC	2020	present
CASL Elite	2013	2013
CD Aguiluchos USA	2013	2018
Cedar Stars FC	2022	2022
Central Florida Panthers SC	2019	2022
Charlottesville Alliance FC	2018	2020
Charlottetowne Hops FC	2023	present
Chattanooga FC	2009	2019
Chesterfield United FC	2013	2013
Chicago Mustangs (Provisional)	2016	2016
Chico Rooks	2003	2006
Club Atletico Saint Louis	2022	2024
Cincinnati Saints/Dayton Dynamo	2014	2017
City of Angels FC	2017	2019
Cleveland SC	2018	present
Colorado Crimson	2007	2007
Columbus United	2024	2024
Contra Costa FC	2021	2022
Corinthians FC of San Antonio	2014	present
Coyotes FC/ Central Texas Coyotes FC	2020	present
Crossfire Redmond, Crossfire Red, Crossfire White	2019	present
Cruizers FC	2025	present
Dakota Fusion FC	2017	2024
Dallas City FC	2014	2021
D.C. United U-23	2013	2014
Del Rey City SC	2014	2014
Denton Diablos FC	2019	2024
Denver Kickers	2006	2007
Iowa Demon Hawks	2023	present
Club de Lyon FC	2025	present
Deportivo Coras USA/Club Xolos USA U-23	2015	2020
Demize NPSL	2014	2024
Detroit Arsenal	2005	2006
Detroit City FC	2012	2019
District Elite FC	2025	present
Duluth FC	2017	present
Dutch Lions FC/Miami Dutch Lions FC	2016	present
Eau Claire Aris/LaCrosse Aris FC	2009	present
Ehtar Belleville FC	2023	present
El Farolito Soccer Club	2018	present
Electric City Shock SC	2014	present
Elm City Express	2017	2018
Erie Admirals SC/Erie Commodores FC	2009	present
FC Arizona	2017	2024
FCAZ Tucson	2024	2024
FC Baltimore/FC Baltimore Christos	2018	2021
FC Bordo Saint Louis	2014	present
FC Brownsville/ Brownsville NPSL	2018	present
FC Buffalo	2010	2022
FC Carolina Discoveries/FC Carolina United	2014	2017
FC Columbus	2018	present
FC Davis	2018	present
FC Florida	2025	present
FC Frederick	2015	present
FC Golden State	2018	2021
FC Hasental	2011	2015
F.C. Indiana	2007	2021
FC Force	2014	2015
FC Monmouth	2018	2024
F.C. New York	2012	2012
FC Pride Elite	2025	present
FC Sparta Michigan/Michigan Stars FC	2013	2019
Michigan Rangers FC	2023	present
FC Reading Revolution	2009	2013
FC Tacoma 253/OSA FC/OSA Seattle FC	2015	present
FC Tulsa	2010	2010
FC Wichita	2015	2019
First State FC	2020	2024
Florida Roots Futbol Club	2021	present
Fort Lauderdale Strikers U-23	2016	2016
Fort Pitt Regiment	2014	2018
Fort Wayne FC	2020	2020
Fort Worth Vaqueros FC	2014	present
Fullerton Rangers	2012	2012
Gate City FC	2014	2014
Georgia Revolution FC	2011	present
Georgia Storm FC	2021	present
Glendale Lions FC	2024	2024
Gorge FC	2014	2014
Grand Rapids Alliance	2005	2006
Grand Rapids FC	2016	2019
Greater Binghamton FC	2012	2014
Greater Lowell United FC	2014	2016
Greater Lowell NPSL FC	2017	2018
Greater Lowell Rough Diamonds	2019	2021
Greenville FC	2018	2019
Greenville United FC	2023	present
Grove Soccer United/ Grove United	2022	present
Gulf Coast Texans/Pensacola FC	2013	present
Hartford City FC	2017	present
Hershey FC	2013	present
High Desert Elite FC	2019	2020
Hollywood United Hitmen	2011	2011
Houston Hurricanes FC	2013	2013
Idaho Wolves	2004	2004
Indianapolis Braves	2007	2007
Indios USA	2007	2008
Inter Nashville FC	2017	2020
Inter United FC	2014	2014
Iowa Raptors FC	2023	present
Irving FC/ Gallos FC	2021	2023
Jackson Lions FC	2022	present
Jacksonville Armada FC	2018	2018
Jacksonville United FC/Jacksonville Armada U-23	2011	present
Jersey City Eagles/Clarkstown SC Eagles/FC Motown	2012	present
Joplin Demize/Demize NPSL	2014	present
Joy St. Louis Park	2021	present
Junior Lone Star FC/Philadelphia Lone Star FC	2012	2022
Philadelphia Union Development Squad	2023	present
Kalamazoo FC	2016	2020
Kansas City Sol	2023	2024
Katy 1895 FC/CF10 Houston FC	2018	2024
Kingston Stockade FC	2016	2024
Kitsap Pumas	2017	2018
Knoxville Force/Emerald Force SC	2011	2018
Kraze United	2015	2017
Lancaster Inferno	2008	2008
Lancaster Rattlers/FC Santa Clarita	2011	2013
Lansing United	2014	2017
Laredo Heat	2018	2024
Las Vegas Knights FC	2024	2024
Las Vegas Legends	2020	2024
Las Vegas Stallions	2013	2013
Las Vegas Strikers	2003	2006
Legacy 76	2014	2018
Little Rock Rangers	2016	2020
Liverpool Warriors	2013	2016
Long Island Academy	2007	2010
LSA Athletico Lanier	2020	2022
Lubbock Matadors	2022	present
Magia FC	2022	2022
Maine Sting	2008	2009
Maryland Bobcats FC	2020	2020
Maryland United FC/Charm City FC	2008	2009
Mass United FC	2011	2012
Med City FC	2017	present
Memphis City FC	2016	2017
Metro Louisville FC	2020	2021
Miami Beach CF/ Atletico De Miami Beach	2022	present
Miami FC 2/ Miami FC	2018	2019
Miami Fusion FC	2015	2017
Miami United FC	2013	2022
Milwaukee Bavarian SC	2005	2013
Milwaukee Torrent	2016	present
Minnesota Blast/NSC United	2005	2006
Minneapolis City SC	2017	2022
Minnesota Kings	2010	2011
Minnesota Twin Stars	2005	2024
Minnesota United FC Reserves	2014	2015
Mississippi Storm	2012	2013
Morris County Colonials/Jersey Blues FC	2008	2015
Muskegon Risers SC	2020	2022
Myrtle Beach Mutiny	2012	2018
Napa Valley 1839 FC	2017	2024
Naples United FC	2017	present
Nashville Atlas FC/Nashville FC	2014	2016
Nashville United	2020	2020
New Hampshire Mountaineers	2010	2010
New Haven United FC	2025	present
New Jersey Blaze	2010	2011
New Jersey Copa FC	2016	2019
New Jersey United AC	2024	present
New Orleans Jesters	2013	present
New York Athletic Club S.C.	2008	2020
New York Cosmos B	2015	2019
New York Red Bull NPSL	2010	2014
New York Shockers	2021	present
NorCal Lamorinda United SC	2009	2009
North Alabama SC	2020	2022
North Coast Tsunami	2012	2012
Northern Virginia United FC	2018	present
North County Battalion	2016	2016
Northern Nevada Aces	2003	2004
Oakland SC	2022	2024
OKC 1889 FC	2021	2024
Oklahoma City FC	2014	2014
Orange County FC	2017	2019
Orange County Pateadores FC	2013	2013
Osner's FC	2025	present
Oxnard Guerreros FC	2017	2020
Ozark FC	2017	2020
Panathinaikos Chicago	2021	2022
PDX FC	2017	2021
Pensacola FC	2020	2024
Pennsylvania Classics	2022	present
Pennsylvania Stoners	2008	2009
Performance FC Phoenix	2008	2008
Players Development Academy	2025	present
Philadelphia Ukrainian Nationals	2022	present
Phoenix Banat Storm	2006	2006
Phoenix Monsoon	2012	2012
Pierce County FC	2017	2017
Steel City FC (Pennsylvania)/Pittsburgh Hotspurs	2019	2024
Pocono Snow	2009	2013
Port City FC	2020	2021
PSC FC Florida	2025	present
Princeton 56ers/Madison 56ers	2005	2015
Project 510	2020	2020
Pumas FC	2009	2010
Quad City Eagles	2011	2014
Queen City FC	2007	2008
Real San Jose	2007	2025
Real Shore F.C.	2007	2007
Redwood City Ruckus	2006	2006
Regals SCA/Houston Regals	2013	2018
Reign FK	2021	2023
Ristozi FC	2025	present
Rhode Island Reds F.C.	2012	2020
Rochester River Dogz FC/Rochester Lancers	2016	2021
Rocket City United	2008	2013
Rockford Raptors/ Chicago Fire NPSL/ Indiana Fire/ Indy Eleven NPSL	2007	2016
RVA FC/ Fredericksburg FC	2013	2017
Sacramento Gold	2010	present
Sacramento Knights	2004	2007
Saint Louis Club Atletico	2018	present
Salinas Valley Samba	2004	2009
San Diego Boca F.C./ FC Force	2010	2014
San Diego Flash	2011	2015
San Diego Pumitas	2005	2007
San Diego United	2008	2009
San Francisco Stompers FC/ East Bay FC Stompers/Oakland Stompers	2012	present
San Leandro United FC	2025	present
San Ramon FC	2019	2024
Santa Ana Winds FC	2011	2011
Santa Cruz County Breakers	2007	2008
Saturn FC	2009	2009
SC Brave Lions/Lions United FC	2022	2024
Seacoast United Mariners	2012	2013
Seacoast United Phantoms	2011	2013
Seattle Sporting FC	2014	2014
Shreveport Rafters FC	2016	2018
Sioux Falls Thunder FC	2017	present
Sonoma County Sol	2004	present
SoCal SC	2016	2017
Southern California Fusion	2006	2007
Southern Oregon Starphire FC	2009	2010
Southern States SC	2021	present
Spartans Futbol Club/FC Mulhouse Portland/International Portland Select FC	2014	present
Spokane Shadow	2017	2021
Sport Club Corinthians USA	2016	2017
Storm FC	2014	2021
Sunflower State FC	2017	2024
Syracuse FC	2017	present
Tacoma Stars	2020	2021
Tallahassee SC	2020	2024
Tampa Bay Rowdies 2	2016	2016
Tampa Marauders	2013	2014
Temecula FC	2014	2021
Tobacco Road FC	2016	2016
Toledo Villa FC	2019	2020
TSC Maryland Red Devils	2010	2010
TSF FC	2017	2018
Tucson Tiburons	2003	2003
Tulsa Athletic	2013	2024
Tyler FC	2017	2019
Upward Stars	2014	2015
Utah Salt Ratz	2003	2004
Valeo FC	2020	2024
Virginia Beach City FC	2014	present
Virginia Dream FC	2023	present
VSLT FC	2017	2017
West Chester United SC	2017	present
Midland-Odessa Sockers FC/West Texas FC	2017	present
Weston FC	2015	2016
Zanesville Athletic FC	2013	2013
