= 2008 NPSL season =

National Premier Soccer League
- Season: 2008
- Champions: Pennsylvania Stoners (1st Title)
- Regular Season Champions: Pennsylvania Stoners (1st Title)

The 2008 National Premier Soccer League season was the 6th season of the NPSL. The season started in May, 2008, and ended with the NPSL Championship Game on August 3, 2008.

Pennsylvania Stoners finished the season as national champions, beating St. Paul Twin Stars in the NPSL Championship game in Uniondale, New York on 3 August 2008.

Pennsylvania Stoners forward Tom Ehrlich was named the National Premier Soccer League's Player of the Year. Tom Ehrlich was also the league's top scorer, with 11 goals.

== Changes From 2007 ==
=== New Franchises ===
- Twelve franchises joined the league this year, all expansion franchises:

Team name	Metro area	Location	Previous affiliation
Alabama Spirit	Birmingham area	Birmingham, AL	expansion - Provisional member
Arizona Sahuaros	Phoenix area	Phoenix, AZ	returned to league after several years in USASA
Atlanta FC	Greater Atlanta area	Sandy Springs, GA	expansion
Lancaster Inferno	Lancaster area	Salunga-Landisville, PA	expansion
Maine Sting	State of Maine	Bangor, ME	expansion
Maryland United	Harford County area	Bel Air, MD	expansion
Morris County Colonials	Morris County area	Morristown, NJ	expansion
New York Athletic Club	Wetschester County area	Pelham, NY	expansion
Pennsylvania Stoners	Lehigh Valley area	Allentown, PA	expansion
Performance FC Phoenix	Greenville area	Greenville, SC	expansion
Rocket City United	Huntsville area	Huntsville, AL	expansion
San Diego United	Greater San Diego area	El Cajon, CA	expansion

=== Name Changes ===
- Rockford Raptors changed its name to Chicago Fire NPSL (the actual organization did not change its name, just its NPSL competitive arm)
- Maryland United changed its name to Charm City FC mid-season

=== Folding ===
- Six teams left the league prior to the beginning of the season:
  - Colorado Crimson - Broomfield, Colorado
  - Denver Kickers - Golden, Colorado
  - Indianapolis Braves - Lawrence, Indiana
  - Real Shore FC - Lincroft, New Jersey
  - San Diego Pumitas - San Diego, California
  - Southern California Fusion - Carlsbad, California
- In addition, three 2007 teams chose to spend the 2008 season on hiatus, with plans to return in 2009:
  - FC Indiana - Indianapolis, Indiana
  - Indios USA - Canutillo, Texas
  - Sacramento Knights - Sacramento, California

== Final standings ==
Purple indicates division title clinched

=== North Division ===
Place	Team	P	W	L	T	GF	GA	GD	Points
1	Pennsylvania Stoners	10							25
2	Boston Aztec	10							19
3	Queen City FC	10							7
4	Maine Sting	9							4
5	Morris County Colonials	9							1

=== Mid-Atlantic Division ===
Place	Team	P	W	L	T	GF	GA	GD	Points
1	Long Island Academy	9							23
2	New York Athletic Club	10							14
3	Maryland United	9							13
4	Lancaster Inferno	8							11
5	Atlantic City Diablos	10							9

=== Southeast Division ===
Place	Team	P	W	L	T	GF	GA	GD	Points
1	Atlanta FC	8	6	2	0				18
2	Performance FC Phoenix	8	3	3	2				11
3	Rocket City United	8	1	5	2				5
4	Alabama Spirit	0							0

=== Midwest Division ===
Place	Team	P	W	L	T	GF	GA	GD	Points
1	Minnesota TwinStars	6							12
2	Chicago Fire NPSL	6							11
3	Princeton 56ers	6							11
4	Milwaukee Bavarians	6							0

=== Southwest Division ===
Place	Team	P	W	L	T	GF	GA	GD	Points
1	San Diego United	8	5	2	1				16
2	Arizona Sahuaros	8	3	4	1				10
3	Albuquerque Asylum	8	2	4	2				8

=== Northwest Division ===
Place	Team	P	W	L	T	GF	GA	GD	Points
1	Sonoma County Sol	9							21
2	Santa Cruz County Breakers	9							20
3	Real San Jose	9							10
4	Salinas Valley Samba	9							0

== Playoffs ==
=== Divisional Rounds ===
Sonoma County Sol 3-1 San Diego United
Minnesota TwinStars beat Atlanta FC

=== Semi finals ===
Pennsylvania Stoners beat Sonoma County Sol
Minnesota TwinStars 1-1 Long Island Academy (Minnesota TwinStars win 4-2 on penalties)

=== Final ===
Pennsylvania Stoners 3-0 St. Paul Twin Stars

=== Bracket ===
Quarterfinals
SE	San Diego United	1
NE	Sonoma County Sol	3
MW	Minnesota Twin Stars
SE	Atlanta FC

Semifinals
N	Pennsylvania Stoners
NE	Sonoma County Sol
MA	Long Island Academy	1(2)
MW	Minnesota Twin Stars	1(4)

Finals
N	Pennsylvania Stoners	3
MW	Minnesota Twin Stars	0
