= 2009 NPSL season =

National Premier Soccer League
- Season: 2009
- Champions: Sonoma County Sol (1st Title)
- Regular Season Champions: Erie Admirals SC (1st Title)
- Matches: 126
- Goals: 440 (3.49 per match)

The 2009 National Premier Soccer League season was the 7th season of the NPSL. The season began on May 2, 2009, and ended with the NPSL Championship Game in August 2009. Sonoma County Sol finished the season as national champions, beating Erie Admirals 2-1 in the championship game on August 1, 2009.

== Changes from 2008 ==
=== New franchises ===
- Twelve franchises joined the league this year, all expansion franchises:

Team name	Metro area	Location	Previous affiliation
Bay Area Ambassadors	San Francisco Bay area	Hayward, CA	expansion
Buffalo City	Buffalo area	Buffalo, NY	expansion
Chattanooga FC	Chattanooga area	Chattanooga, TN	expansion
Eau Claire Aris	Eau Claire area	Eau Claire, WI	expansion
Erie Admirals	Erie area	Erie, PA	expansion
FC Indiana	Indianapolis area	Muncie, IN	return from hiatus
NorCal Lamorinda United	Lamorinda area	Orinda, CA	expansion
Pocono Snow	Pocono Mountains area	East Stroudsburg, PA	expansion
Pumas FC	Greater Birmingham area	Birmingham, AL	expansion
Reading Revolution	Reading area	Reading, PA	expansion
Saturn FC	Marietta area	East Point, GA	expansion
Southern Oregon Fuego	Southern Oregon area	Medford, OR	expansion

=== Name changes ===
- Princeton 56ers changed its name to Madison 56ers

=== Folding ===
- Seven teams left the league prior to the beginning of the season:
  - Alabama Spirit - Birmingham, Alabama (never actually played an official NPSL game)
  - Atlantic City Diablos - Atlantic City, New Jersey
  - Lancaster Inferno - Salunga-Landisville, Pennsylvania
  - Milwaukee Bavarians - Milwaukee, Wisconsin
  - Performance FC Phoenix - Greenville, South Carolina
  - Queen City FC - Buffalo, New York
  - Santa Cruz County Breakers - Aptos, California
- In addition, three 2008 teams either chose or were forced to spend the 2009 season on hiatus, with plans to return in 2010:
  - Albuquerque Asylum - Albuquerque, New Mexico
  - Arizona Sahuaros - Phoenix, Arizona
  - San Diego United - El Cajon, California
- Also, two teams which spent the 2008 season on hiatus did not return, and left the league permanently:
  - Indios USA - Canutillo, Texas
  - Sacramento Knights - Sacramento, California

== Standings ==
Purple indicates division title clinched
Yellow indicates team received playoff spot

=== Eastern Keystone Division ===
Place	Team	P	W	L	T	GF	GA	GD	Points
1	Erie Admirals	10	9	0	1	21	6	+16	28
2	Buffalo City	10	8	2	0	22	7	+15	24
3	Pennsylvania Stoners	10	5	4	1	17	13	+4	16
4	Reading Revolution	10	3	6	1	12	23	-11	10
5	Pocono Snow	10	0	9	1	11	30	-19	1
6	Charm City	10	3	7	0	12	16	-4	0

Note: Charm City deducted nine points for failing to fulfil its last three fixtures.

=== Eastern Atlantic Division ===
Place	Team	P	W	L	T	GF	GA	GD	Points
1	Boston Aztec	8	5	2	1	19	12	+17	13
2	Long Island Academy	8	4	1	3	20	16	+14	12
3	Maine Sting	8	3	2	3	14	15	-1	12
4	Morris County Colonials	8	3	4	1	16	14	+2	10
5	New York Athletic Club	8	1	7	0	8	29	-21	3

Note: Boston deducted three points for failing to fulfil its last fixture.

=== Southeast Division ===
Place	Team	P	W	L	T	GF	GA	GD	Points
1	Rocket City United	8	5	2	1	18	9	+9	16
2	Atlanta FC	8	4	3	1	13	9	+4	13
3	Chattanooga FC	8	4	3	1	11	10	+1	13
4	Pumas FC	8	3	4	1	17	21	-4	10
5	Saturn FC	8	2	6	0	12	22	-10	6

=== Midwest Division ===
Place	Team	P	W	L	T	GF	GA	GD	Points
1	Minnesota Twin Stars FC	8	5	2	1	14	7	+7	16
2	Chicago Fire NPSL	8	5	2	1	24	10	+14	16
3	Madison 56ers	8	5	2	1	21	10	+11	16
4	Eau Claire Aris	8	1	7	0	7	29	-22	3
5	FC Indiana	8	2	5	1	9	21	-12	1

Note: Indiana deducted six points for failing to fulfil its last two fixtures.

=== Western Division ===
Place	Team	P	W	L	T	GF	GA	GD	Points
1	Sonoma County Sol	12	9	0	3	42	10	+32	30
2	NorCal Lamorinda United	12	7	4	1	24	14	+10	22
3	Bay Area Ambassadors	12	5	7	0	17	23	-6	15
4	Southern Oregon Fuego	12	4	7	1	17	23	-6	13
5	Real San Jose	12	3	5	4	15	17	-2	13
6	Salinas Valley Samba	12	2	7	3	10	38	-28	9

== Playoffs ==
=== Western Division Playoffs ===
Semifinals
W1	Sonoma County Sol	4
W4	Southern Oregon Fuego	1
W2	NorCal Lamorinda United	1
W3	Bay Area Ambassadors	0

Division Final
W1	Sonoma County Sol	2
W2	NorCal Lamorinda United	1

=== National Playoffs ===
Playoff
EK	Erie Admirals	2
EA	Boston Aztec	0

Semifinals
EK	Erie Admirals	4
SE	Rocket City United	2
W1	Sonoma County Sol	4
MW	Minnesota TwinStars FC	1

Final
EK	Erie Admirals	1
W1	Sonoma County Sol	2

=== NPSL Championship Game ===
August 1, 2009

Erie Admirals	1–2 (a.e.t.)	Sonoma County Sol
Deighton 15' (yellow card) 62'; Fahandezh (yellow card) 15'; Howell (yellow card) 22'; Duggan (yellow card) 53'; Trujillo (yellow card) 65'; Tattersall (yellow card) 90'; Blythe (yellow card) 114'; Latifi (yellow card) 119'	Report	Hurst (yellow card) 29' (goal) 111'; Percell 45'; Preckwinkle (yellow card) 50'; Daly (yellow card) 67'; Maycock (yellow card) 112'

Breese Stevens Field
Madison, Wisconsin
