= 2007 NPSL season =

National Premier Soccer League
- Season: 2007
- Champions: Southern California Fusion (1st Title)
- Regular Season Champions: Princeton 56ers (2nd Title)

The 2007 National Premier Soccer League season was the 5th season of the NPSL. The season started in May 2007, and ended with the NPSL Championship Game in August 2007.

Southern California Fusion finished the season as national champions, beating Queen City FC 1-0 in the NPSL Championship game in San Diego, CA.

== Changes From 2006 ==
=== New Franchises ===
- Twelve franchises joined the league this year, all expansion franchises:

Team name	Metro area	Location	Previous affiliation
Atlantic City Diablos	Atlantic City area	Richland, NJ	expansion
Boston Aztec	Boston area	Lowell, MA	expansion
Colorado Crimson	Denver metro area	Broomfield, CO	expansion
FC Indiana	Indianapolis area	Indianapolis, IN	expansion
Indianapolis Braves	Indianapolis metro area	Lawrence, IN	expansion
Indios USA	El Paso metro area	Canutillo, TX	expansion
Long Island Academy	Long Island area	Hempstead, NY	expansion
Queen City FC	Buffalo area	Buffalo, NY	expansion
Real San Jose	San Jose area	San Jose, CA	expansion
Real Shore FC	Jersey Shore area	Lincroft, NJ	expansion
Rockford Raptors	Rockford area	Rockford, IL	expansion (spent time in the USL in 1990s)
Santa Cruz County Breakers	Santa Cruz County area	Aptos, CA	expansion

=== Folding ===
- Eight teams left the league prior to the beginning of the season:
  - Chico Rooks - Chico, California
  - Detroit Arsenal - Berkley, Michigan
  - Grand Rapids Alliance - Grand Rapids, Michigan
  - Las Vegas Strikers - Las Vegas, Nevada
  - Minnesota NSC United - Blaine, Minnesota
  - Phoenix Banat Storm - Avondale, Arizona
  - Redwood City Ruckus - San Bruno, California
  - San Jose Frogs - San Jose, California -- left to join USL Premier Development League

== Final standings ==
Purple indicates division title clinched

=== Northeast Division ===
Place	Team	P	W	L	T	GF	GA	GD	Points
1	Queen City FC	10	7	2	1				22
2	Atlantic City Diablos	10	5	1	4				19
3	Long Island Academy	10	5	2	3				18
4	Boston Aztec	10	3	5	2				11
5	Real Shore FC	10	0	10	0				0

=== Midwest Division ===
Place	Team	P	W	L	T	GF	GA	GD	Points
1	Princeton 56ers	10	8	1	1				25
2	Milwaukee Bavarians	10	8	2	0				24
3	Minnesota TwinStars	10	5	3	2				17
4	Indianapolis Braves	10	4	6	0				12
5	Rockford Raptors	10	3	6	1				10
6	FC Indiana	10	0	10	0				0

=== Southwest Division ===
Place	Team	P	W	L	T	GF	GA	GD	Points
1	Southern California Fusion	14	10	3	1				31
2	Indios USA	14	9	1	4				31
3	Albuquerque Asylum	14	7	4	3				24
4	San Diego Pumitas	14	3	8	3				12
5	Colorado Crimson	12	1	8	3				6
6	Denver Kickers	12	1	9	2				5

=== Northwest Division ===
Place	Team	P	W	L	T	GF	GA	GD	Points
1	Sonoma County Sol	14	8	2	4				28
2	Sacramento Knights	14	7	2	5				26
3	Santa Cruz County Breakers	14	7	4	3				24
4	Salinas Valley Samba	14	3	7	4				13
5	Real San Jose	14	1	9	4				7

== Playoffs ==
=== Northeast Division Playoffs ===
July 20, 2007
6:30PM EST
Northeast Division Semifinal

Atlantic City Diablos	1–0	Long Island Academy
Meyers 79'	Report

St. Augustine Preparatory School, Buena Vista Township, New Jersey

July 22, 2007
4:00 PM EST
Northeast Division Final

Queen City FC	1–0	Atlantic City Diablos
83'	Report

Orchard Park Soccer Complex, Buffalo, New York

Semi-Finals
NW	Sonoma County Sol	4 (3)
NE	Queen City FC	4 (4)
SW	Southern California Fusion	1
MW	Princeton 56ers	0

Championship
NE	Queen City FC	0
SW	Southern California Fusion	1

==== Semifinals ====
July 27, 2007
6:00 PM PDT

Sonoma County Sol	4–4 (a.e.t.)	Queen City FC
Penalties
	3–4

Helix High School, La Mesa, California
July 27, 2007
8:00 PM PDT

Southern California Fusion	1–0	Princeton 56ers

Helix High School, La Mesa, California

==== Third Place Game ====
July 28, 2007

Sonoma County Sol	0–1	Princeton 56ers
		Conklin 45'

Helix High School, La Mesa, California
Attendance: NA

==== NPSL Championship Game ====
July 28, 2007
8:00 PM PDT

Southern California Fusion	1–0	Queen City FC

Helix High School, La Mesa, California
