= 2010 NPSL season =

National Premier Soccer League
- Season: 2010
- Champions: Sacramento Gold (1st Title)
- Regular Season Champions: FC Sonic Lehigh Valley (1st Title) and New York Red Bulls NPSL (1st Title)
- Matches: 162
- Goals: 606 (3.74 per match)

The 2010 National Premier Soccer League season is the 8th season of the NPSL. The season began on April 3, 2010, and ended with the NPSL Championship Game in August. The NPSL had planned for form a Winter league that would play from September 2010 to March 2011 but when only three clubs were willing to participate the plans were dropped. Those three clubs eventually ended up forming the SPSL for that Fall, though that league would fold the following Spring.

== Changes from 2009 ==
=== New clubs ===
- Twelve clubs joined the league this year, eleven new clubs and one returning to the NPSL after playing for several years in USASA regional amateur leagues:

Team name	Metro area	Location	Previous affiliation
Boston Tea Men	Boston area	North Andover, MA	expansion
Brooklyn Italians	Borough of Brooklyn	Brooklyn, NY	expansion
FC Buffalo	Buffalo area	Buffalo, NY	expansion
TSC Maryland Red Devils	Baltimore area	Columbia, MD	expansion
Milwaukee Bavarians	Milwaukee area	Milwaukee, WI	return from USASA
Minnesota Kings	Minneapolis area	Minnetonka, MN	expansion
New Hampshire Mountaineers	State of New Hampshire	Manchester, NH	expansion
New Jersey Blaze	Central New Jersey area	Monmouth Junction, NJ	expansion
New York Red Bull NPSL	New York area	Newark, NJ	expansion
Sacramento Gold	Sacramento area	Sacramento, CA	expansion
San Diego Boca FC	San Diego area	La Mesa, CA	expansion
FC Tulsa	Tulsa area	Tulsa, OK	expansion

=== Name changes ===
- Pennsylvania Stoners changed its name to FC Sonic Lehigh Valley

=== Folding ===
- Eight teams left the league prior to the beginning of the season:
  - Boston Aztec – Amesbury, Massachusetts
  - Buffalo City – Buffalo, New York
  - Charm City – Gambrills, Maryland
  - FC Indiana – Lafayette, Indiana
  - Maine Sting – Bangor, Maine
  - NorCal Lamorinda United – Orinda, California
  - Salinas Valley Samba – Watsonville, California
  - Saturn FC – East Point, Georgia
- Also, four teams which spent the 2009 season on hiatus did not return, and left the league permanently:
  - Albuquerque Asylum – Albuquerque, New Mexico
  - Arizona Sahuaros – Phoenix, Arizona
  - Atlantic City Diablos – Richland, New Jersey
  - San Diego United – El Cajon, California

== Standings ==
Purple indicates division title clinched
Green indicates playoff berth clinched

=== Northeast Keystone Division ===
Place	Team	P	W	L	T	GF	GA	GD	Points
1	FC Sonic Lehigh Valley	12	10	1	1	30	9	+21	31
2	Erie Admirals	12	10	2	0	31	10	+21	30
3	FC Buffalo	12	6	4	2	23	14	+9	20
4	Reading Revolution	12	5	7	0	20	32	−12	15
5	Pocono Snow	12	2	5	5	15	21	−6	11
6	TSC Maryland Red Devils	12	3	8	1	14	29	−15	10
7	New Jersey Blaze	12	1	10	1	11	29	−18	4

=== Northeast Atlantic Division ===
Place	Team	P	W	L	T	GF	GA	GD	Points
1	New York Red Bull NPSL	12	10	1	1	32	6	+26	31
2	Brooklyn Italians	12	10	1	1	34	12	+22	31
3	New Hampshire Mountaineers	12	5	5	2	21	15	+6	17
4	Morris County Colonials	12	5	5	2	18	17	+1	17
5	New York Athletic Club	12	4	5	3	14	20	−6	15
6	Boston Tea Men	12	1	8	3	13	31	−18	6
7	Long Island Academy	12	1	11	0	5	36	−31	3

=== Southeast Division ===
Place	Team	P	W	L	T	GF	GA	GD	Points
1	Chattanooga FC	8	6	0	2	19	5	+14	20
2	FC Tulsa	8	4	2	2	16	12	+4	14
3	Rocket City United	8	3	2	3	15	12	+3	12
4	Pumas FC	8	2	5	1	11	17	−6	7
5	Atlanta FC	8	0	6	2	7	22	−15	2

=== Midwest Division ===
Place	Team	P	W	L	T	GF	GA	GD	Points
1	Madison 56ers	10	8	2	0	26	9	+17	24
2	Chicago Fire NPSL	9	5	1	3	24	9	+15	18
3	Minnesota TwinStars FC	10	5	3	2	18	17	+1	17
4	Milwaukee Bavarians	10	4	5	1	24	21	+3	13
5	Minnesota Kings	10	3	6	1	21	25	−4	10
6	Eau Claire Aris	9	0	8	1	13	45	−32	1

=== Northwest Division ===
Place	Team	P	W	L	T	GF	GA	GD	Points
1	Sacramento Gold	10	7	2	1	37	17	+20	22
2	Real San Jose	10	5	3	2	25	21	+4	17
3	Bay Area Ambassadors	10	4	3	3	23	19	+4	15
4	San Diego Boca	10	4	3	3	16	17	−1	15
5	Sonoma County Sol	9	2	2	5	16	12	+4	11
6	Southern Oregon Fuego	9	0	9	0	14	45	−31	0

== Playoffs ==
=== Northeast Division Playoff ===
FC Sonic Lehigh Valley beat New York Red Bull NPSL

=== Northwest Division Playoffs ===
Sacramento Gold 6–3 Bay Area Ambassadors
San Diego Boca 4–0 Real San Jose

Sacramento Gold beat San Diego Boca

=== National Semi-Finals ===
Sacramento Gold 4–1 FC Sonic Lehigh Valley
Chattanooga FC 2–0 Madison 56ers

=== Third Place Playoff ===
FC Sonic Lehigh Valley 3–1 Madison 56ers

=== NPSL Championship Game ===
Sacramento Gold 3–1 Chattanooga FC
