= Jason Sabio =

Filipino soccer player (born 1986)

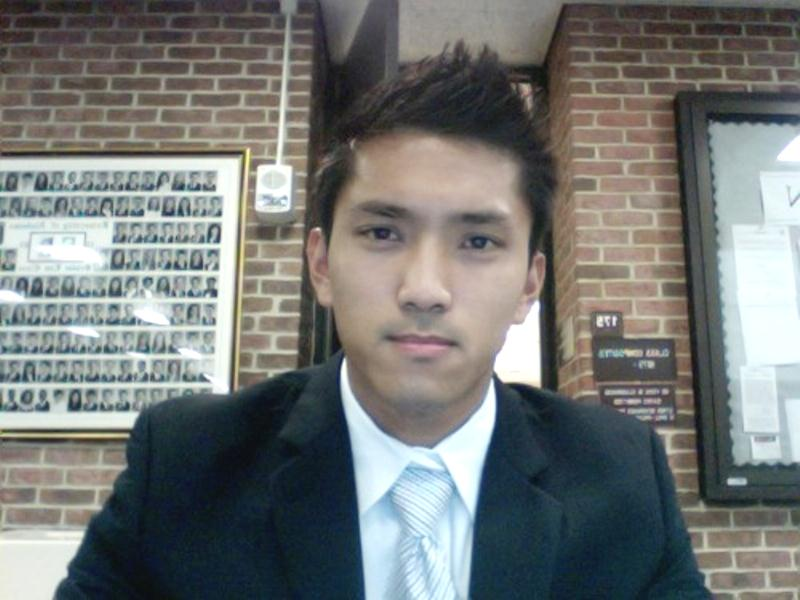
- Sabio in 2011

Personal information
- Full name: Jason Abbott Abantao Sabio
- Date of birth: 30 June 1986 (age 40)
- Place of birth: Manila, Philippines
- Height: 5 ft 10 in (1.78 m)
- Position: Defender

Youth career
- Grissom High School
- 2004–2007: BSC Panthers

Senior career*
Years	Team	Apps	(Gls)
- Alabama Spirit
2009	Rocket City United		(0)
2011	Rocket City United		(0)
2011–2012	Kaya		
2014–2016	Ceres		

International career^{‡}
2011–	Philippines	15	(0)
- * Club domestic league appearances and goals as of 13:50, 26 June 2012 (UTC) ‡ National team caps and goals as of 13:25, 27 September 2012 (UTC)

Jason Abbott Abantao Sabio (born 30 June 1986) is a Filipino soccer player who plays as a center-back or a right-back. He is more comfortable at central defense because of his leap, speed, and communication skills.

Born in the Philippines, he migrated to the United States as a child and played collegiate soccer for Birmingham–Southern College. He then played in the semi-professional National Premier Soccer League before moving to the Philippines to play for Kaya and Ceres in the United Football League.

He represented the Philippines national team in the 2012 AFC Challenge Cup in which they finished third, and in the 2012 AFF Championship where they were semi-finalists.

== Early life ==
Sabio was born in Manila, Philippines whose parents are physicians. His mother is originally from Koronadal and his father is from Marikina. In 1989 Sabio's father started working in the United States, and by 1991, Sabio and his mother followed. They were originally based in Long Island, New York but moved to Huntsville, Alabama when Sabio was in the 5th grade. Growing up in Huntsville, he spent a lot of time at his best friend's (named Edward Wills) house due to his parents working a lot. Wills was a soccer player and he was the one who got Sabio into the sport by the 7th grade.

== Playing career ==
=== College career ===
Sabio was recruited from Grissom High School by Birmingham–Southern College where he received an academic and athletic scholarship. He played for BSC's soccer team, the Panthers from 2004–2007 and won two NCAA Division 1 Big South Conference championships. Sabio revealed that after two years, he took classes at Northwestern University and almost transferred there but decided to stay at BSC due to their better paying scholarship. After graduation, he was offered a contract to play professionally in Germany but declined the offer due to personal obligations and opting to teach and coach in a high school.

=== Club career ===
A former Alabama Spirit player, he was signed by Rocket City United (RCU) for the 2009 NPSL season in late April 2009. He made his debut in RCU's opening game on 2 May 2009 as he conceded two goals in their 2–1 defeat to Saturn FC. He would concede another two goals in their following match against Pumas FC but RCU were able to win 5–2. It would be his last match until their 1–1 away draw to Chattanooga FC on 21 June as Sabio had other commitments which included trying out for the Philippines national team. During his absence, RCU suffered a second league defeat, losing 2–0 to Atlanta FC. This would be their last defeat in the regular season and Sabio would be part of RCU's undefeated run which led them to win the Southeast Division Championship. However, he conceded four goals in a 4–2 defeat to the Erie Admirals in the NPSL National semi-finals.

Sabio was bound to play for RCU in the 2010 NPSL season but was unable due to commitments to his law firm work. However, the club reported on 1 February 2011 that he will be returning for the 2011 NPSL season. His first game back came on the opening day of the season. He got an assist and a clean sheet as RCU defeated Knoxville Force 2–0. He would practically the miss the rest the season due to being on international duty with the Philippines national team.

On 13 August 2011, it was reported that Sabio had signed for Kaya in the Philippines.

=== International career ===
Sabio was discovered by Philippines national team captain Aly Borromeo. Sabio met him in the summer of 2009 and since then, Borromeo has been getting him to join the Philippines national team. He was not able to do so due to commitments in law school. By January 2011, as the Philippines were preparing for their 2012 AFC Challenge Cup qualification first leg play-off match against Mongolia on 9 February, it was reported that Sabio was one of six new foreign based players that would be trying out for the team. He joined the team on 31 January, just nine days before their match against Mongolia but was still named in the final roster. During the match, he came on as a 70th-minute substitute for Anton del Rosario at right back and provided the assist to Phil Younghusband's injury time goal, as the Philippines eventually won 2–0. Due to the absence of regular central defender Rob Gier, Sabio started and completed the 90 minutes in the second leg against Mongolia. However, he gave away a penalty and eventually conceded two goals, as the Philippines lost 2–1. They still advanced to the group stage of the qualification by winning 3–2 on aggregate.

== Coaching career ==
In the spring of 2008, Sabio was on the coaching staff of John Carroll High School's junior varsity team and varsity team where they won the state championship. While at John Carroll he was also accused multiple times of engaging in sexual misconduct with underage students. In 2009, he also coached the Huntsville High School girls soccer team, Huntsville United soccer club, and an under-12 boys team.

== Personal life ==
He graduated cum laude with a bachelor's degree in biochemistry from Birmingham–Southern College. He then taught physics and environmental science at a high school. As of 2011, he was attending the University of Alabama School of Law and was a player-coach of their soccer team.

== Honors ==
=== Club ===
Kaya

- UFL Division 1: Runner-up 2012

=== National team ===
- AFC Challenge Cup: Third 2012
- Philippine Peace Cup: 2012
