= Tea Men =

Tea Men is the name of several American former soccer teams:

- Boston Tea Men, based in North Andover, Massachusetts
- Jacksonville Tea Men, based in Jacksonville, Florida
- New England Tea Men, based in Greater Boston
