= Rowland Park (New Jersey) =

Coordinates: 40.34721°N 74.54556°W

- Interactive map of Rowland Park
- Location: 255 Rowland Rd, Cranbury, NJ 08512
- Operator: Township of South Brunswick
- Surface: Grass

Tenant
- New Jersey Blaze

Rowland Park is a park and sports complex featuring soccer, baseball, and softball facilities. It is located in South Brunswick, New Jersey with a Cranbury, NJ address and is the home of the New Jersey Blaze of the Women's Premier Soccer League (WPSL).
