= Annapolis Blues FC =

Annapolis Blues
- Full name: Annapolis Blues Football Club
- Founded: June 2022; 4 years ago
- Stadium: Navy–Marine Corps Memorial Stadium; Annapolis, Maryland
- Capacity: 34,000
- Owners: Michael Hitchcock; Kyle Beckerman; Alex Yi
- Head coaches: Colin Herriot (Men), Ashly Kennedy (Women)
- League: USL League Two; USL W League
- 2025: 4th of Chesapeake Division
- Website: annapolisblues.com
Home colors

Annapolis Blues Football Club is an American soccer club founded in 2022. For the 2025 season, Annapolis Blues FC introduced a women's team. The men's team currently competes in the Chesapeake Division of USL League Two, considered the fourth tier of the United States soccer league system. The men's team previously played in the National Premier Soccer League. The women's team competes in USL W League.

The team's home field is the Navy–Marine Corps Memorial Stadium in Annapolis, Maryland.

== History ==
In June 2022, the National Premier Soccer League announced a new expansion team would be placed in Annapolis for the 2023 season. The ownership effort was led by former DC United front office member Michael Hitchcock, former United States men's national soccer team player Kyle Beckerman, and former FC Dallas player Alex Yi. The latter two are Maryland locals while Hitchcock owns multiple NPSL teams including Appalachian FC and 2021 national champion Denton Diablos FC. During the summer the team held an online poll where fans could choose between four potential team names and crests; Annapolis Blues FC, Annapolis Kraken SC, Annapolis Seawolves SC, and Annapolis Yard FC. The name Annapolis Blues FC was announced on August 16 after over 1,200 votes had been cast. It was also announced around this time that the team would play its home games at the Navy–Marine Corps Memorial Stadium on the campus of the United States Naval Academy in Annapolis, Maryland.

The Club announced Fred Matthes as its first General Manager in October 2022. A colleague of Hitchcock's from early D.C. United and Major League Soccer days with over 30 years of front office experience with MLS,USL,NWSL,NISA and NPSL Clubs throughout the Country.

The Blues announced Colin Herriot as the team's first head coach on December 13.

The team's first game was a pre-season friendly against Philadelphia Union Development Squad on Wednesday, May 10 at Memorial Stadium. The Community Shield match saw 3,915 fans and raised money to support local charity Rebuilding Together Anne Arundel County. Following three away games to start the season, Annapolis played its first regular season home game on Saturday, June 3 against FC Frederick and set an NPSL attendance record with 8,368 fans. The Blues won the match, 4–2. The next home match against Virginia Beach City FC drew 7,665 attendees. The following month they broke the conference championship record again as a crowd of 8,480 watched the Blues defeat the Alexandria Reds in the conference final. They once again set the NPSL attendance record during their 2024 home opener with 11,171 fans watching Annapolis defeat DMV Elite FC 6–2. At the end of the 2024 season Annapolis held the top eight and ten of the top eleven NPSL attendance records.

In November 2024 the team announced it would add a women's team. The women's team competes in the USL W league. On December 20, 2024, it was announced that the club would be joining USL League Two for the upcoming 2025 Season. In May 2025 the Annapolis Blues beat Christos FC in their home opener in front a USL League Two record crowd of 12,853.

== Seasons ==
=== Men's team ===
Season	Record									Position			USOC
Season	League	Conf/Div	Pld	W	D	L	GF	GA	Pts	Conf/Div	Ovr	Playoffs	USOC
2023	NPSL	Mid-Atlantic	10	8	1	1	32	8	25	1st	7th	Regional Semi-Final	Ineligible
2024	NPSL	Mid-Atlantic	10	9	0	1	48	11	27	1st	1st	Conference Final	DNQ
2025	USL League Two	Chesapeake	14	7	1	6	31	25	22	4th	4th	DNQ	DNQ
2026	USL League Two	Chesapeake	14	7	2	5	36	20	23	5th	–	DNQ	DNQ

=== Women's team ===
Season	Record									Position		
Season	League	Conf/Div	Pld	W	D	L	GF	GA	Pts	Conf/Div	Ovr	Playoffs
2025	USL W	Chesapeake	10	9	1	0	34	5	28	1st	5th	Conference Final
2026	USL W	Chesapeake	10	5	1	4	19	12	16	3rd	N/A	Did not qualify

=== Attendance ===
Home Attendance
Season	Regular Season Total	Regular Season Average	Playoffs Total	Playoffs Average	Highest	Combined Total	Combined Average	Ref.
2023	38,770	7,754	15,562	7,781	8,480	54,332	7,762	
2024	46,145	9,229	15,160	7,580	11,171	61,305	8,758	
2025	60,948	8,707	—N/a	—N/a	12,853	60,970	8,707	(Note: Total attendance figures: 9,126 + 7,453 + 8,421 + 7,096 + 7,736 + 8,263 + 12,853)

=== Players & staff ===
==== Men's Coaches ====
- (Scotland) Colin Herriot, head coach (2023–present)
- (United States) Daniel Louisignau, assistant coach (2023–present)

==== Women's Coach ====
- (United States) Ashly Kennedy, head coach (2025–present)

==== Front office ====
- (United States) Steven Hooper, Men's General Manager | VP of Sales and Marketing (2022–present)
- (United States) Jim Gabarra, women's general manager (2024–present)

==== Current squad ====
As of June 24, 2023

Note: Flags indicate national team as defined under FIFA eligibility rules; some limited exceptions apply. Players may hold more than one non-FIFA nationality.

No.	Pos.	Nation	Player
—	MF	USA	Aidan Abril
—	GK	USA	Owen Allegro
—	FW	USA	Gordon Bernlohr
—	FW	JPN	Toshi Davis
—	MF	ARG	Matias de Jesus
—	DF	BRA	Elton De Oliveira Santos
—	MF	USA	Luke Dunne
—	MF	USA	Luke Eberle
—	DF	USA	Liam Giblin
—	FW	USA	Eric Gwadz
—	MF	USA	Justin Harris
—	GK	USA	Griffin Hemmendinger
—	MF	USA	Miles Lam
—	DF	USA	James Lee
—	DF	USA	Brian Lenzer
—	MF	USA	Morgan Lussi

No.	Pos.	Nation	Player
—	DF	USA	Nathan Macek
—	MF	USA	Myles Mansfield
—	MF	RSA	Jade Mesias
—	MF	USA	Francis Meyer
—	GK	SCO	Lucas Muller
—	FW	USA	Jacob Murrell
—	MF	USA	Leo Palomo
—	MF	USA	Evan Rabush
—	MF	USA	Jackson Ruckman
—	FW	USA	Manuel Ruiz
—	FW	USA	Andrew Schug
—	GK	USA	Connor Smith
—	DF	USA	Laurence Smith
—	MF	USA	TJ Walker
—	MF	USA	Ethan Wright
—	MF	USA	Webb Kosich

=== Women's team ===
Season	Record									Position	
Season	League	Conf/Div	Pld	W	D	L	GF	GA	Pts	Conf/Div	Playoffs
2025	USL W League	Eastern Conference – Chesapeake Division	10	9	1	0	34	5	28	1st	Conference Finals
