= New Jersey Blaze =

- Full name: New Jersey Blaze
- Nickname: Blaze
- Founded: 2009
- Dissolved: 2012
- Ground: Rowland Park; Monmouth Junction, New Jersey
- Capacity: 800
- Owner: New Jersey Soccer Group
- League: National Premier Soccer League
- Website: http://www.njblaze.com/index.shtml
Home colors	Away colors

New Jersey Blaze was an American soccer team based in Monmouth Junction, New Jersey, United States. Founded in 2009, the team played in the National Premier Soccer League (NPSL), a national amateur league at the fourth tier of the American Soccer Pyramid, in the Northeast Keystone Division between 2010 and 2011.

The team played its home games at Rowland Park. The team's colors are red and gold.

The Blaze organization is owned and operated by the New Jersey Soccer Group, a management company for a family of soccer-based companies offering soccer services in New Jersey.

== Year-by-year ==
Year	Division	League	Regular season	Playoffs	Open Cup
2010	4	NPSL	7th, Keystone	Did not qualify	Did not enter
2011	4	NPSL	8th, Keystone	Did not qualify	Did not enter

== Head coach(es) ==
- Rob Napier (2010–2011)

== Stadia ==
- Rowland Park; Monmouth Junction, New Jersey (2010–2011)
