= TSC Maryland Red Devils =

- Full name: Thunder Soccer Club Maryland Red Devils
- Nickname: Red Devils
- Founded: 2009
- Ground: Howard Community College; Columbia, Maryland
- Capacity: ????
- Owner: (United States) Shaun Fleming
- Head Coach: (Bulgaria) Stefan Draganov
- League: National Premier Soccer League
- 2010: 6th, Keystone; Playoffs: DNQ
Home colors	Away colors

TSC Maryland Red Devils is an American soccer team based in Lisbon, Maryland, United States. Founded in 2009, the team plays in the National Premier Soccer League (NPSL), a national amateur league at the fourth tier of the American Soccer Pyramid, in the Northeast Keystone Division.

The team splits its home games between the stadium at Howard Community College and Cedar Lane Park, both in nearby Columbia, Maryland. The team's colors are red, black and white.

The team organization is owned and operated by the Thunder Soccer Club, a long-standing youth soccer organization representing the Howard County area of Maryland.

== Players ==
=== 2010 roster ===
Note: Flags indicate national team as defined under FIFA eligibility rules; some limited exceptions apply. Players may hold more than one non-FIFA nationality.

No.	Pos.	Nation	Player
0	GK	USA	Robert Hollasch
1	GK	USA	Dan Louisignau
2	DF	USA	Matt Procopio
3	DF	USA	Chris Williams
4	MF	USA	Frank Doumbe
5	DF	USA	Corey Adams
6	DF	USA	Scott DeFrances
7	MF	NGA	Terry Akpua
8	MF	PER	Freddy Llerena
9	FW	USA	Ipolite Aly
10	MF	USA	Gordon Templeman
11	DF	USA	Tony Gass
13	DF	USA	Justin Wolf
14	FW	BUL	Angel Draganov

No.	Pos.	Nation	Player
16	MF	USA	Ayinde Akinbinu
17	MF	NGA	Kingsley Onwuka
18	MF	USA	Chris Saul
19	FW	NGA	Anthony Okodua
20	MF	GHA	Kojo Avlesi
21	DF	USA	Brian Davis
22	DF	USA	Donald Dokas
23	MF	USA	Josh Danza
24	MF	USA	Casey Rector
25	DF	USA	Chris Mumby
26	DF	USA	Joe Prince
28	FW	USA	Nirav Kadam
30	DF	KOR	Woo-Lim Lee
00	GK	USA	Matt McElroy

== Year-by-year ==
Year	Division	League	Regular season	Playoffs	Open Cup
2010	4	NPSL	6th, Keystone	Did not qualify	Did not enter

== Head coaches ==
- (Bulgaria) Stefan Draganov (2010–present)

== Stadia ==
- Stadium at Howard Community College; Columbia, Maryland (2010–present)
- Cedar Lane Park; Columbia, Maryland (2010–present)
