= Idaho Wolves =

- Full name: Idaho Wolves
- Nickname(s): The Wolves
- Founded: 2004
- Ground: Idaho Wolves Stadium
- Chairman: Adolfo Lopez
- Manager: Ali Siahpush
- League: National Premier Soccer League
- 2004: 10th, did not make playoffs
Home colours	Away colours

Idaho Wolves were an American soccer team, founded in 2004. The team was a member of the National Premier Soccer League (NPSL), the fourth tier of the American Soccer Pyramid, for just one season. They finished their one-and-only campaign losing each of their fifteen competitive games, and scoring just eight goals, while conceding 61.

The club's colors were red and white.

== Year-by-year ==
Year	Division	League	Regular season	Playoffs	Open Cup
2004	"4"	MPSL	10th	Did not qualify	Did not qualify
