= Phoenix Monsoon =

- Founded: 2010
- Ground: Rose Mofford Sports Complex
- Capacity: 200
- Chairman: Adrian Quintero
- League: United Premier Soccer League
- Website: http://phoenixmonsoon.club
Home colors	Away colors

Phoenix Monsoon is an amateur soccer team based in Phoenix, Arizona.

== History ==
Founded in 2010, the team played in the National Premier Soccer League, the fourth division of the United States soccer pyramid in 2012. The Monsoon made their debut playing an outdoor exhibition game against FC Edmonton of the NASL on March 19, 2011, losing 5–0.

Original Phoenix Monsoon logo 2010–12

Monsoon logo 2013–15

The Monsoon reorganized in February 2014. A part of a United Premier Soccer League expansion into Arizona, the Monsoon joined the league for the 2015–16 winter season.

== Season-by-season ==
Season	League	Record	Regular season	Playoffs	US Open Cup
2012	NPSL	1–11–0	6th, West-Southern	Did not qualify	Did not qualify
2015–16 Winter	UPSL	5–0–0	1st, Arizona	Quarterfinals	Did not enter

== Honors ==
- UPSL 2015–16 UPSL Arizona Conference winner
