= Madison 56ers =

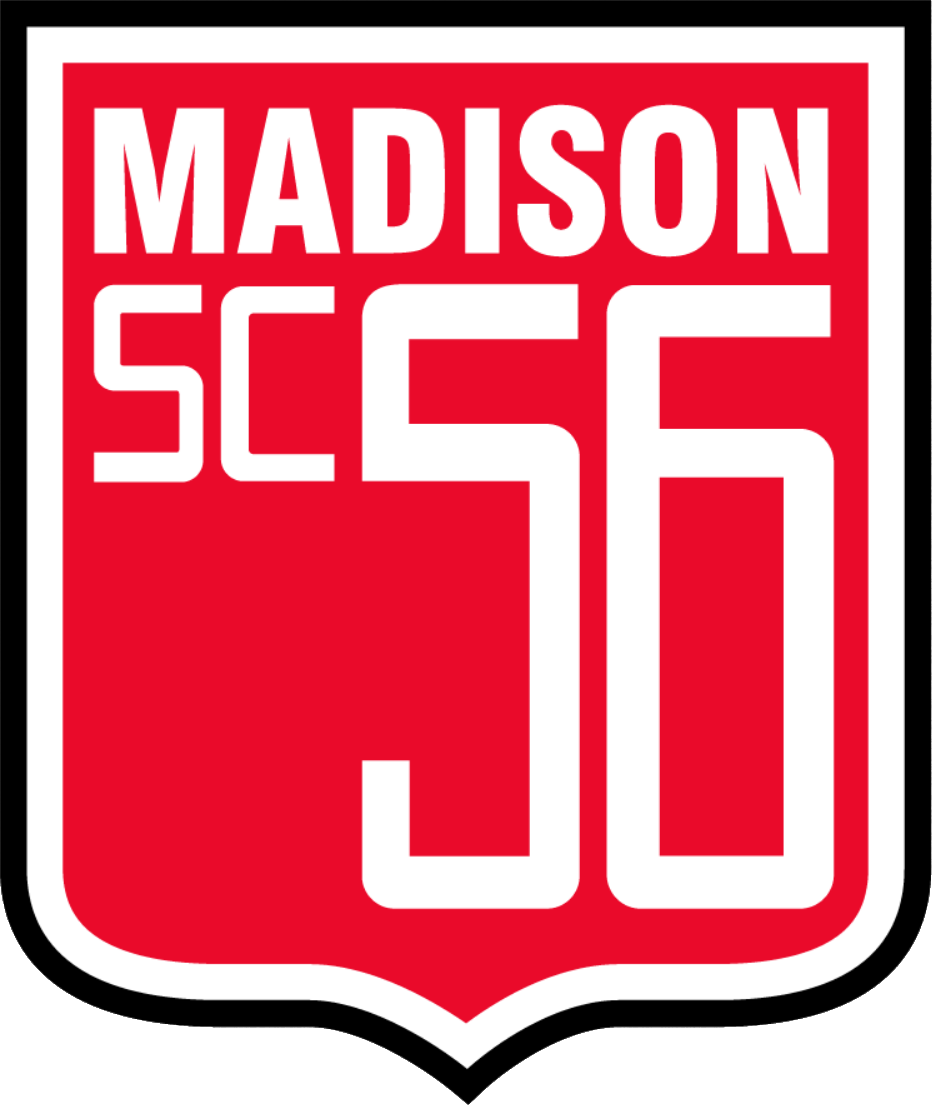
- Full name: Madison 56ers
- Nickname: 56ers
- Founded: 1956
- Stadium: Breese Stevens Field; Madison, Wisconsin
- Capacity: 5,000
- General Manager: Cristian Brei
- Head Coach: Jim Launder
- League: United Premier Soccer League
- 2018: 2nd, UPSL Midwest Conference–North Division
Home colors	Away colors

Original Princeton-56ers logo

Madison 56ers is an American soccer team based in Madison, Wisconsin, United States. Founded in 2005, the team plays in the United Premier Soccer League. Before the 2009 season the team was known as the Princeton 56ers.

Since their inception the club has called Breese Stevens Field its home pitch. The team played one season at Warner Park in 2008 due to renovations at Breese Stevens Field. The team's colors are red, black and white.

The 56ers NPSL side is part of the Madison 56ers Soccer Club, which was founded in 1956. The club has won 22 youth state championships, one men's national championship, six men's state championships, four men's USASA Region II championships and three women's state championships. The 56ers also have a team in the Women's Premier Soccer League that began in 2010.

== History ==
The team's first game was a 5–1 victory over Minnesota club Inferno 95 in a friendly on May 15, 2005, at Breese Stevens Field, with Jed Hohlbein scoring the team's first goal. The team finished 6–8 overall, third in the NPSL Midwest with a 5–5 record, behind NPSL champion Detroit and Milwaukee. Hohlbein was named to the inaugural NPSL All-Midwest team.

In 2006, the Princeton 56ers were 12–2–4 overall and won the NPSL Midwest title with an 8–0–2 record. They lost to the Sacramento Knights 2–0 in the NPSL championship game on July 29, 2006, with Anthony Chimienti and Alfredo Renteria scoring in the final 19 minutes. The game drew a team-record crowd of 1,351. Goalkeeper Eric Mickschl was named the NPSL Midwest MVP, while teammate Jed Hohlbein also made the All-Midwest team for the second time.

In 2007, the team went 13–3–1 overall and repeated as NPSL Midwest champion with an 8–1–1 record. They lost to the Southern California Fusion 1–0 in the NPSL semi-finals on July 27, 2007, in La Mesa, California, then defeated the Sonoma County Sol 1–0 in the third-place match on July 28, 2007. Midfielder Brad Ring was named the NPSL Midwest MVP, and was joined on the All-Midwest team by goalkeeper Ryan Germann, defender Reed Cooper, defender-midfielder Tenzin Rampa and forward Jed Hohlbein. The 56ers made their debut in U.S. Open Cup qualifying in 2007, as the NPSL representative. They lost to Detroit United 2–1 in the first round of the USASA Region II qualifying tournament on April 21. A match against German Fourth Division side SC Wiedenbrück on June 23, 2007, was their first match against international competition.

In 2008, the team went 7–3–2 overall and tied for second place in the NPSL Midwest with a 3–1–2 record. Henry Aiyenero was the team's leading scorer with five goals. Jed Hohlbein, Brad Ring, Reed Cooper and midfielder Trevor Banks were named to the All-Midwest team. In the 2008 U.S. Open Cup, they won by forfeit over the Bloomington (Ind.) Cutters in the first round of Region II qualifying, then lost to RWB Adria 2–0 in the semi-finals.

In 2009, the team finished 8–3–2 overall and 5–2–1 in the NPSL Midwest, tying the St. Paul Twin Stars and the Chicago Fire NPSL atop the standings. The Twin Stars were awarded the regional title and a berth in the NPSL national semi-finals on a tiebreaker. Keith Dangarembwa led the team with four goals and was one of five 56ers players named to the All-Midwest team, joining goalkeeper Jon Szafranski, midfielder Pablo Delgado and defenders Trevor Banks and Brian Bultman. The 56ers made their debut in the USASA Region II Amateur Cup, losing to Croatia Cleveland 3–0, then defeating FC Indiana 3–1 and Illinois' AAC Eagles 5–3 at the competition in Oak Forest, Ill., but failing to advance to the final.

In 2010, the team finished 10–7–2 overall and 8–2–0 in the NPSL Midwest, claiming its third regional championship. The 56ers lost to Chattanooga FC 2–0 in the NPSL national semi-finals on July 29, 2010, and lost to FC Sonic Lehigh Valley 3–1 in the third-place match on July 30, 2010. Brazilian Werebetth Rocha, known as Betinho, led the team with eight goals. Midfielder Trevor Banks was named to the All-Midwest team for the third time, while midfielder Keenan Newallo, defender Brian Bultman and goalkeeper Jon Szafranski were honored for the second time. Defender Sean Ronnekleiv-Kelly, in his first season with the team, also was an all-region selection. The 56ers finished 0–1–1 at the USASA Region II Amateur Cup, tying Detroit United 1–1 and losing to Illinois' Inferno SC 3–0; their scheduled finale against St. Louis Kutis SC was canceled due to field conditions with both teams out of contention for advancement.

In 2011, the 56ers made their first appearance in the U.S. Open Cup since starting the NPSL team. An earlier men's amateur team from the club qualified for the tournament in 1988, 1989, 1990 and 1991.

In 2015, after winning the Midwest conference of the NPSL, the club switched to the second-year Premier League of America.

== Alumni ==
Jed Hohlbein, who starred at nearby Middleton High School and played two seasons at the University of Wisconsin–Madison, led the team in goals in each of its first three seasons, scoring 10 in 2005 and 13 in both 2006 and 2007. He scored three goals in 2008 and one in 2010 and is the team's career leading scorer with 40 goals.

Hohlbein had the 56ers' first hat trick in a 3–2 home victory over the St. Paul Twin Stars on May 20, 2006, then added another in a 4–1 home friendly win over German side SC Wiedenbruck on June 23, 2007. Andre Francois also had a hat trick in a 9–1 home win over the Madison Latino League All-Stars in a friendly on July 2, 2006. Henry Aiyenero had the fourth three-goal game in team history on July 12, 2008, in a 7–0 win over the Milwaukee Bavarians and Betinho posted the fifth on June 28, 2010, in a 9–1 victory over Eau Claire Aris FC. The nine goals against the Madison Latino League All-Stars in 2006 and Eau Claire Aris FC in 2010 stand as the team record for goals in a match.

Eight 56ers players have gone on to professional careers. Defender Aaron Hohlbein, like his older brother a former standout at Middleton High School and the University of Wisconsin–Madison, was selected by the Kansas City Wizards with the third pick of the 2007 MLS Supplemental Draft. He signed a senior contract with the Wizards on March 1, 2007, and made his MLS debut on April 14, 2007. He spent time on loan with Miami FC Blues of the U.S. Soccer Federation Division-2 Pro League in 2010 and signed with the team in 2011, when it was renamed the Fort Lauderdale Strikers and joined the North American Soccer League. Midfielder-defender Noah Goerlitz, a native of Neenah, Wisconsin who also played at the University of Wisconsin–Madison, played with Canterbury United in the New Zealand Football Championship in the 2006–2007 season. Brad Ring, a midfielder for the team in 2007 and 2008, was selected by the San Jose Earthquakes with the 17th pick of the 2009 MLS SuperDraft. Jed Hohlbein played with VfR Süsterfeld Kassel in Germany in 2009, helping the team earn promotion from the Seventh Division in the process. Midfielder Andy Adlard was selected by the Columbus Crew in the third round of the 2011 MLS Supplemental Draft and signed with the club on February 21, 2011. Scott Lorenz and Alex Horwath, also former University of Wisconsin–Madison standouts, were free agents who signed with MLS teams in 2011, Lorenz with Sporting Kansas City and Horwath with New York Red Bulls. Forward J. C. Banks signed with the Rochester Rhinos in the USL Professional Division and currently plays for Forward Madison Football Club in the USL League One.

== Supporters ==
Founded in 2014, the Capitol City Supporters, or "Cap City" for short, is the independent supporters club for the Madison 56ers SC. Cap City prides itself creating a culture that shows passion for the 56ers and the city of Madison. The Red Rebels were an earlier supporters group dedicated to the 56ers and Wisconsin Badgers.

== Players ==
=== 2018 Roster ===
Note: Flags indicate national team as defined under FIFA eligibility rules; some limited exceptions apply. Players may hold more than one non-FIFA nationality.

No.	Pos.	Nation	Player
1	GK	USA	Austin Salazar
2	DF	USA	Caleb Walters
3	DF	MEX	Dejesus Herrera
4	DF	USA	Christopher Brown
5	DF	USA	Samba Kawsu
6	MF	USA	Vital Nizigiyimana
8	MF	ESP	Alieu Camara
9	FW	USA	Bachirou Lo
10	MF	ENG	George Morris
11	FW	USA	Ali Barry
13	GK	USA	Noah Heim
14	MF	USA	Ally Diaby

No.	Pos.	Nation	Player
15	MF	USA	Keenan Newallo
18	MF	USA	Keegan Thompson
19	DF	USA	Henry Aiyenero
20	MF	TUR	Erdi Engin
21	FW	USA	Sam Novak
22	DF	USA	Noah Herkert
24	DF	USA	Brian Bultman
25	FW	USA	Samuel Tazifua
27	GK	USA	Scott Sibik
29	DF	USA	Aaron Negron
30	MF	USA	Victor Lombardino
34	GK	USA	Dominick Laporte

== Season-by-season ==
Year	Division	League	Reg. season	Playoffs	Open Cup
2005	4	NPSL	3rd Midwest	Did not qualify	Did not qualify
2006	4	NPSL	1st, Midwest	National Runners-up	Did not qualify
2007	4	NPSL	1st, Midwest	National Third place	Did not qualify
2008	4	NPSL	3rd, Midwest	Did not qualify	Did not qualify
2009	4	NPSL	3rd, Midwest	Did not qualify	Did not enter
2010	4	NPSL	1st, Midwest	National semi-finals	Did not enter
2011	4	NPSL	3rd, Midwest	Did not qualify	2nd round
2012	4	NPSL	1st, Midwest-Central	National Third place	Did not qualify
2013	4	NPSL	3rd, Midwest-Central	Did not qualify	Did not qualify
2014	4	NPSL	3rd, Midwest-Central	Did not qualify	Did not qualify
2015	4	NPSL	1st, Midwest	Regional semi-finals	Did not qualify
2016	4	PLA	6th, West	Did not qualify	Did not qualify
2017	4	PLA	3rd, West	Did not qualify	Did not qualify
2018	4	UPSL	2nd, Midwest-North	Did not qualify	Did not qualify

== Honors ==
=== Domestic ===
- National Premier Soccer League
- Midwest Division (NPSL):
  - Winners (4): 2006, 2007, 2010, 2012,

== Head coaches ==
- (United States) Jim Launder (2005–present)

Launder coached the University of Wisconsin–Madison men's soccer team to its only NCAA championship in 1995 and was an assistant coach for the Columbus Crew of Major League Soccer from 2002 to 2004. From 2005 to 2007, their assistant coach was Danny van Mol, who also was a player-assistant coach for the team in 2005. Enzo Fuschino served as assistant coach in 2008. Henry Aiyenero was a player-assistant coach in 2010 and 2011. Jed Hohlbein took over that role in 2012.

== Stadia ==
- Breese Stevens Field; Madison, Wisconsin (2005–2007, 2009–present)
- Warner Park; Madison, Wisconsin (2008)
