= North Coast FC Sol =

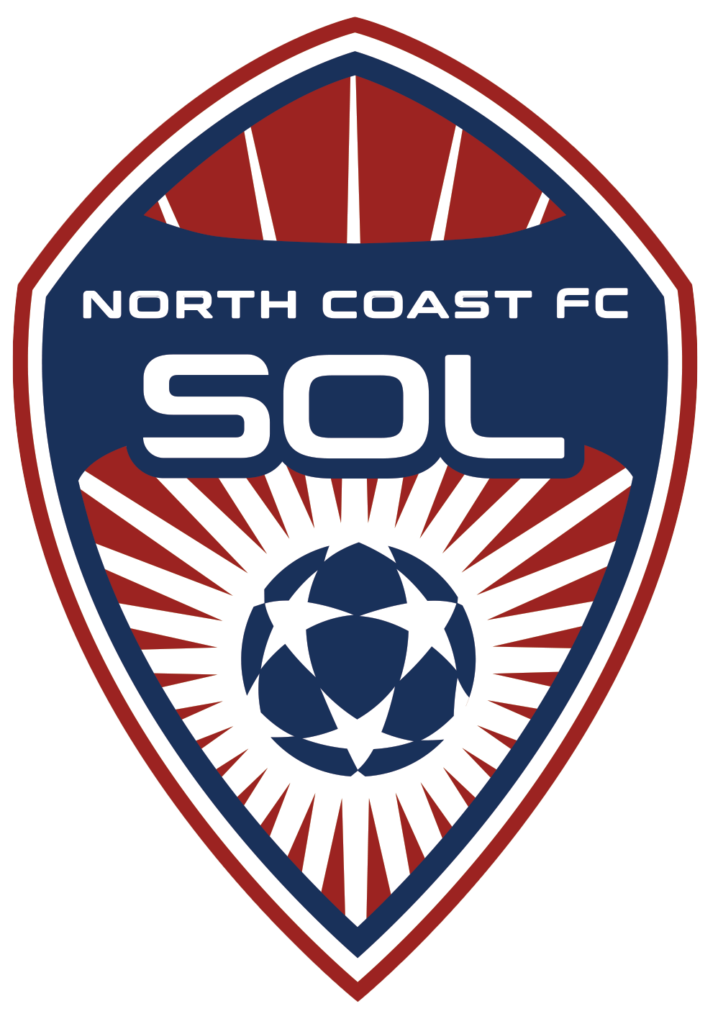
- Full name: North Coast FC Sol
- Nickname: Sol
- Founded: 2004; 22 years ago as Sonoma County Sol Soccer Club
- Stadium: Petaluma Community Sports Fields; Petaluma, California
- Head Coach: Irving Ventura
- League: The League for Clubs
- Website: northcoastfcsol.org
Home colors	Away colors

North Coast FC Sol is an American soccer team based in Santa Rosa, California, United States. Founded in 2004 as Sonoma County Sol Soccer Club, the team plays in The League for Clubs, a national amateur league at the fourth tier of the American Soccer Pyramid, in the West Region, NorCal Conference.

The team plays its home games at Casa Grande High School. It previously played at Cougar Stadium on the campus of Rancho Cotate High School in nearby Rohnert Park, California.

The team had a sister organization, also called Sonoma County Sol, which played in the Women's Premier Soccer League.

== History ==
After the 2004 season, the MPSL disbanded, but a new men's league, the National Premier Soccer League, replaced the previous league and expanded on the territory of the MPSL by adding a Midwestern Division. The Sol was one of the founding clubs of the NPSL, specifically in the Western Division. Like the NPSL and its member clubs, the Sol falls under the auspices of the United States Amateur Soccer Association (USASA) and the United States Soccer Federation (USSF).

In 2005, the Sol finished second in the Western Division in the regular season standings, 3 points behind the Sacramento Knights, attaining the number 2 seed in the NPSL West playoffs. In the Western Division playoffs, the Sol beat the number 3 seed Chico Rooks at home in the semi-finals and then traveled to Sacramento to face the Knights in the NPSL West Championship Game. The Sol triumphed over the Knights in a hard fought match at the soccer stadium at Sacramento State University, garnering the NPSL West Championship. The Sol then hosted Midwest Champion Detroit Arsenal for the inaugural NPSL National Championship game in Santa Rosa, California.

Also in 2005, the Sol qualified as one of three NPSL West representatives for the Region IV U.S. Open Cup (U.S. Open Cup Website qualifying tournament, where the Sol won its group and then went on to beat the Salinas Valley Samba for the tournament championship and a spot in the USASA National Open Cup. The Sol would later meet the Samba in Santa Rosa in the first round of the U.S. Open Cup itself. At the USASA National Open Cup in the August heat of Frisco, Texas, in the semi-finals the Sol faced the AAC Eagles of Chicago who prevailed 2–1. With this result, the Sol's 2005 campaign came to an end.

In 2006 however, the Sol bounced back and prevailed in the USASA Open Cup. It started with a road trip to Seattle for the Region VI championships. The Sol beat out the Chico Rooks (NPSL) in group play to advance to the finals, where they defeated the Suaharos (sp?) 2–1 in the finals. Beto Sanchez, the back up goalkeeper, was subbed on as a forward due to injuries in the 80th minute, and netted the game winner in the 85th minute on a diving header. The Sol then traveled to Frisco, TX for the national finals where they defeated the heavily favored (and overrated) home side Dallas Roma FC 3–2 in double over time. They then went on to defeat the Lightning (Chicago) 1–0 in the finals to claim the USASA National open cup championship.

In 2013, following a first-place finish in the Golden Gate Conference during the regular season, the Sol would advance through the playoffs to the NPSL Championship Final, visiting RVA Football Club, but losing 2–0.

In 2024, Sonoma County Sol announced they would join The League for Clubs for the 2025 season.

== Coaching staff ==
Coaches
Head Coach- Irving Ventura
Assistant Coach- Antonio Picazo
Assistant Coach- Jose

== Year-by-year ==
Year	Level	League	Division	Reg. season	Playoffs	Open Cup
2004	4	MPSL	–	6th	Did not qualify	Did not qualify
2005	4	NPSL	West	2nd	Final	1st round
2006	4	NPSL	Northwest	3rd	Did not qualify	2nd round
2007	4	NPSL	Northwest	1st	Semi-final	Did not qualify
2008	4	NPSL	Northwest	1st	Semi-final	Did not qualify
2009	4	NPSL	Western	1st	Champions	2nd round
2010	4	NPSL	Northwest	5th	Did not qualify	1st round
2011	4	NPSL	West Division - Flight Northwest	3rd	Did not qualify	Did not qualify
2012	4	NPSL	West Division – Northern Conference	2nd	Conference Final	Did not qualify
2013	4	NPSL	West Division – Northern Conference	1st	Final	Qualification–NPSL Final
2014	4	NPSL	West Division – Golden Gate Conference	2nd	Regional Final	Qualification–NPSL Final
2015	4	NPSL	West Division – Golden Gate Conference	1st	Regional Semi-final	2nd round
2016	4	NPSL	West Division – Golden Gate Conference	1st	Final	Did not qualify
2017	4	NPSL	West Region – Golden Gate Conference	2nd	Regional First round	1st round
2018	4	NPSL	West Region – Golden Gate Conference	3rd	Regional First round	Did not qualify
2019	4	NPSL	West Region – Golden Gate Conference	8th	Did not qualify	Did not qualify
2020	4	NPSL	Season cancelled due to the COVID-19 pandemic			
2021	4	NPSL	Did not participate due to the COVID-19 pandemic			
2022	4	NPSL	West Region – Golden Gate Conference	8th	Regional First round	Did not qualify
2023	4	NPSL	West Region – Golden Gate Conference	6th	Quarterfinals	Did not qualify
2024	4	UPSL	NorCal North	1st	Round of 32	Did not participate
2025	4	TLC	West Region – NorCal Conference	13th	Did not qualify	Did not participate

== Honors ==
=== Domestic ===
- National Premier Soccer League
  - Winners (1): 2009
  - Runner-up (3): 2005, 2013, 2016
- Western Regional Champs (Playoff NPSL):
  - Winners (6): 2005, 2007, 2008, 2009, 2013, 2016
- Northwest Division (NPSL):
  - Winners (4): 2007, 2008, 2009, 2013
- Golden Gate Conference (NPSL):
  - Winners (2): 2015, 2016
- Hank Steinbrecher Cup (USASA):
  - Runner-up (1): 2014

== Head coaches ==
- (United States) Hugo Pérez (2004)
- (United States) David Shaffer (2005–2006)
- (United States) Benjamin Ziemer (2007–2011)
- (United States) Mark Carr (2012)
- (United States) Vinny Cortezzo (2012–present)

== Home Field ==
- Ernie Nevers Field at Santa Rosa High School; Santa Rosa, California (2004–2010, 2016)
- Seawolf Stadium at Sonoma State University; Rohnert Park, California (2011)
- Cougar Stadium at Rancho Cotate High School; Rohnert Park, California (2012–2015)
- Casa Grande High School Petaluma, California (2017–present)
