= Bay Area Ambassadors =

- Full name: Bay Area Ambassadors Football Club
- Nickname: Ambassadors
- Founded: 2009
- Ground: Gladiator Stadium; Hayward, California
- Capacity: 1,000
- Owners: (Fiji) Arif Khan (Nigeria) Tony Igwe
- Head Coaches: (Nepal) Ajit Rana (United States) Roland Tillak
- League: National Premier Soccer League
- 2010: 4th, West-Northern Conference; Playoffs: Divisional Semi Finals
| Home colors | Away colors |

Bay Area Ambassadors was an American soccer team based in Hayward, California. Active from 2009 to 2012, the team played in National Premier Soccer League (NPSL), a national amateur league at the fourth tier of the American Soccer Pyramid, in the Northwest Division.

The team played its home games at Gladiator Stadium on the campus of Chabot College, and the team's colors were white, black and red.

== History ==
In 2013 the team moved to Oakland, California, joined the NorCal Division of U.S. Club Soccer's National Premier Leagues, and changed their name to Oakland Ambassadors FC.

== Players ==
=== 2011 roster ===
Note: Flags indicate national team as defined under FIFA eligibility rules; some limited exceptions apply. Players may hold more than one non-FIFA nationality.

| No. | Pos. | Nation | Player |
|---|---|---|---|
| 1 | GK | MEX | Sergio Valle |
| 2 | MF | GER | Stefan Clemens |
| 4 | MF | PAK | Kamran Khan |
| 6 | DF | USA | Dannylo Ayllon |
| 7 | FW | BRA | Pedro Osorio |
| 12 | FW | NEP | Aneesh Rana |
| 14 | MF | USA | Jordan Keyes |
| 16 | DF | USA | Mohammed Samy |
| 14 | DF | AFG | Yusef Samy |
| 18 | DF | USA | Jordan Grider |
| 19 | MF | USA | Francis Lopez |
| 20 | FW | LBR | Sylvester Kaar |
| 22 | MF | USA | Jasko Begovic |

| No. | Pos. | Nation | Player |
|---|---|---|---|
| 24 | DF | PAK | Jadid Khan |
| 00 | GK | USA | Harris Smiler |
| 17 | FW | RUS | Igor Charsov |
| — | FW | USA | Mark Araujo |
| — | MF | USA | Ernesto Benitez |
| — | | USA | Jorge Hernandez |
| — | FW | SRB | Zlatan Kuckovic |
| — | GK | USA | Derek Leslie |
| — | MF | CAN | Imone Mohanta |
| — | | USA | Ricardo Ramirez |
| — | GK | SRB | Zlatan Sahmanovic |
| — | | USA | Avninder Sohal |
| — | MF | JPN | Ryuji Otsubo |

== Year-by-year ==
| Year | Division | League | Regular season | Playoffs | Open Cup |
|---|---|---|---|---|---|
| 2009 | 4 | NPSL | 3rd, Western | Divisional Semi Finals | Did not enter |
| 2010 | 4 | NPSL | 4th, Northwest | Divisional Semi Finals | 1st Round |
| 2011 | 4 | NPSL | 4th, West-Northern | Did not qualify | Did not qualify |
| 2012 | 4 | NPSL | 1st, West-Northern | TBD | Did not qualify |

== Head coaches ==
- (Scotland) Paul McCallion (2009)
- (Nepal) Ajit Rana (2010–present)
  - Joao Bule - intern (2010-2011)
- (United States) Roland Tillak (2010–present)
- Mohammed Mohammed (2010–present)

== Stadia ==
- Gladiator Stadium at Chabot College; Hayward, California (2009–2012)
