= Redwood City Ruckus =

- Full name: Redwood City Ruckus
- Nickname(s): The Ruckus
- Founded: 2006
- Dissolved: 2006
- Ground: Skyline College Stadium
- League: National Premier Soccer League
- 2006: 4th, did not make playoffs
Home colours	Away colours

Redwood City Ruckus were an American soccer team, founded in 2006, who played in the National Premier Soccer League (NPSL), the fourth tier of the American Soccer Pyramid, for just one season.

The Ruckus played their home matches in the stadium on the campus of Skyline College in the city of San Bruno, California, 15 miles north-east of Redwood City, California, near San Francisco. The team's colors were dark blue, red, white and green.

== Year-by-year ==
Year	Division	League	Reg. season	Playoffs	Open Cup
2006	4	NPSL	4th, Northwest	Did not qualify	Did not qualify
