= Queen City FC =

- Full name: Queen City Football Club
- Founded: 2006
- Dissolved: 2008
- Ground: All-High Stadium; Buffalo, New York
- Capacity: 4,000
- Chairman: Ryan Knapp
- Manager: Thomas Cordaro
- League: National Premier Soccer League
- 2008: 3rd, North Division; Playoffs: DNQ
| Home colors | Away colors |

Queen City FC was an American soccer team based in Buffalo, New York, United States. Founded in 2006, the team played in the National Premier Soccer League (NPSL), a national amateur league at the fourth tier of the American Soccer Pyramid, until 2008, when the franchise was sold to Mike Share in October 2008 and the team changed names to Buffalo City FC.

The team played its home games All-High Stadium. The team's colors were sky blue and black.

The Front Office consisted of: Executive Director and General Manager, Christopher Keem; Controller, Dennis Behrens; Director of Community Outreach, Micheal Strangio; Technical Director, Brendan Murphy; Director of Field Hockey (offshoot of Queen City FC), Jessica Murphy; Director of Scouting, Kevin Brenner; Transportation Coordinator, Jake Szopinski; Director of Media Relations, Ryan Knapp; Strength and Conditioning, Chris Nentarz.

Supporters Group was led by Jamey Vann, and the name was "The O'Block"

Queen City FC is also the name of an unrelated youth soccer club based in South Burlington, founded in 2011 by Shane Bufano.

== History ==
Queen City FC was started by former professional and college players looking for a side to support in the Greater Buffalo area, with the only high level football played in the area being in Rochester with the Rochester Raging Rhinos, and the MLS expansion team Toronto FC in Toronto. In 2007, Queen City FC won the northeast division and competed for the National NPSL Finals only to lose by one goal. Their debut season can be noted as one of the most successful debut seasons in Buffalo sports history. This success can largely be attributed to the successful recruitment by Director of Scouting Kevin Brenner. Akeem Rodney is one of many players brought in by Brenner. After a successful two seasons, their franchise rights were transferred to Buffalo City FC. Buffalo City FC would later become FC Buffalo in 2009.

== Players ==
=== Player Roster (2006–2008) ===
Note: Flags indicate national team as defined under FIFA eligibility rules; some limited exceptions apply. Players may hold more than one non-FIFA nationality.

| No. | Pos. | Nation | Player |
|---|---|---|---|
| 1 | GK | USA | Shawn McDonell |
| 2 | DF | USA | Casey Derkacz |
| 3 | DF | USA | Andrew Laracuente |
| 4 | DF | USA | Justin Farnsworth |
| 5 | DF | USA | Jeremy Watson |
| 6 | MF | USA | Ali Montacer |
| 8 | DF | USA | Gavin Stabbe |
| 9 | FW | USA | Steve Butcher |
| 11 | FW | USA | Dan Ames |
| 12 | DF | USA | Chris Billoni |
| 13 | DF | USA | Kyle Sniatecki |
| 13 | MF | USA | Christian Elizondo |
| 16 | MF | USA | Dan Cavanaugh |
| 17 | DF | USA | Josh Piscatelli |
| 18 | DF | USA | Salvatore Curella |
| 19 | MF | USA | Al Franjone |
| 20 | DF | USA | Chris Somers |

| No. | Pos. | Nation | Player |
|---|---|---|---|
| 21 | MF | USA | Cory Cwiklinski |
| 22 | FW | USA | Prisco Houndanon |
| 23 | FW | USA | Colin Oliver |
| 24 | FW | USA | Ryan O'Donnell |
| 25 | MF | USA | Jake Schindler |
| 26 | MF | USA | Peter Marlette, Jr |
| 29 | DF | USA | Richard Namulala |
| 28 | GK | USA | JJ Bilinski |
| 30 | FW | USA | Andy Tiedt |
| 31 | DF | USA | Marco Stencil |
| 32 | MF | USA | Brad Lefort |
| 33 | MF | SWE | Chris Lofgren |
| 34 | FW | USA | Matt Contino |
| 36 | FW | RSA | Rudi Costa |
| 37 | MF | USA | Matt Daum |
| 38 | GK | USA | Bart Loos |
| 39 | GK | CAN | Emilio Coletta |
| 40 | MF | USA | Ian Fairlie |

== Year-by-year ==
| Year | Division | League | Regular season | Playoffs | Open Cup |
|---|---|---|---|---|---|
| 2007 | 4 | NPSL | 1st, Northeast | National Finalist | Did not qualify |
| 2008 | 4 | NPSL | 3rd, North | Did not qualify | Did not qualify |

== Honors ==
- NPSL Northeast Division Champions (2007)
- NPSL National Finalist (2007)

== Head coaches ==
- (United Kingdom) Michael Middleton (2007)
- (United States) Thomas Cordaro (2007–2008)

== Stadia ==
- All-High Stadium; Buffalo, New York (2007–2008)

== Supporters ==
The club's supporters group were known as "The O-Block".
