= Performance FC Phoenix =

- Full name: Performance FC Phoenix
- Nickname: Phoenix
- Founded: 2007
- Dissolved: 2008
- Chairman: (United States) Vaughn Bethell
- Manager: (United States) Tom Morris
- League: National Premier Soccer League
- 2008: 2nd, Southeast
Home colours	Away colours

Performance FC Phoenix was an American soccer team based in Greenville, South Carolina, United States. Founded in 2007, the team played in the National Premier Soccer League (NPSL), a national amateur league at the fourth tier of the American Soccer Pyramid, for just one season, until 2008, when the franchise folded and the team left the league.

The team played its home games in the vicinity of the city of Greenville. The team's colors were black, red, and white.

== Players ==
=== 2008 Roster ===
Note: Flags indicate national team as defined under FIFA eligibility rules; some limited exceptions apply. Players may hold more than one non-FIFA nationality.

No.	Pos.	Nation	Player
1	GK	USA	Andy Barth
2	MF	USA	Sebastian Velasquez
3	MF	USA	Miguel Teos
4	DF	USA	Jay Orders
5	DF	USA	Tom Morris
6	DF	USA	Matt Keifer
7	MF	USA	Michael Zion
8	MF	GER	Tim Mittmann
9	FW	USA	Haven Bruce
10	MF	USA	Paul Kolovos
11	FW	ENG	Tolu Popoola
13	MF	USA	David Stovall
14	FW	USA	Matt Morris
15	DF	USA	Cesar Flores
16	DF	USA	Greg Fulton
17	MF	USA	Paul Buckley
18	FW	USA	Vaughn Bethell
21	DF	USA	Nick Willis

No.	Pos.	Nation	Player
19	MF	PER	Nestor Chacon
20	GK	USA	Hunter Gilstrap
—	FW	USA	Eric Baffour
—	DF	USA	Takato Ban
—	MF	USA	Phil Beene
—	DF	NZL	Lewis Chaloner
—	MF	USA	Justin Cooley
—	MF	TRI	Keenon Copeland
—	MF	USA	Jason Dowiak
—	FW	USA	Mac Gambill
—	MF	JAM	Stephon Henry
—	DF	USA	Brandon Hyatt
—	MF	USA	Jeff Looney
—	DF	USA	Josh Nguyen
—	FW	USA	David Stovall
—	DF	USA	Talon Stroud

== Year-by-year ==
Year	Division	League	Regular season	Playoffs	Open Cup
2008	4	NPSL	2nd, Southeast	Divisional Round	Did not qualify

== Head coaches ==
- (United States) Tom Morris (2008)
