= Colorado Crimson =

American soccer team

Colorado Crimson FC
- Full name: Colorado Crimson FC
- Nickname: Crimson
- Founded: 2007
- Ground: Broomfield Commons Stadium
- Capacity: 5,000
- League: National Premier Soccer League
- 2007: 5th, did not make playoffs
Home colours	Away colours

Colorado Crimson were an American soccer team that competed in the National Premier Soccer League (NPSL), the fourth tier of the American Soccer Pyramid, for just one season in 2007.

They played their home games at the Broomfield Commons Stadium in the city of Broomfield, Colorado, 19 miles north of downtown Denver.

The Crimson played their inaugural home NPSL match against the Indios USA on May 27, 2007.

== Year-by-year ==
Year	Division	League	Regular season	Playoffs	Open Cup
2007	"4"	NPSL	5th, Southwest	Did not qualify	Did not qualify
