= Sacramento Knights (2003–2007) =

- Full name: Sacramento Knights Football Club
- Nickname: The Knights
- Founded: 2003
- Dissolved: 2009; 17 years ago
- Ground: Folsom High School
- Capacity: 2,500
- Chairman: Laureate Gholar Jr.
- Manager: Ron Preble
- League: National Premier Soccer League
- 2007: 2nd, Northwest Division
Home colors

Sacramento Knights was an American soccer team based in Folsom, California, United States. Founded in 2003, the team played in the National Premier Soccer League (NPSL), a national amateur league at the fourth tier of the American Soccer Pyramid, until 2008, when the franchise folded and the team left the league. It has been announced that the team will play its 2009 season at Folsom High School as part of the United Soccer League.

The team played its home games in the stadium at Cosumnes River College, and will play its 2009 season at Folsom High School. The team's colors are maroon, navy blue, gold and white.

The team had spent the 2008 season on hiatus while the club's finances and infrastructure are reorganised, but did not return to full competition in 2009.

== Players ==
=== 2007 roster ===
Note: Flags indicate national team as defined under FIFA eligibility rules; some limited exceptions apply. Players may hold more than one non-FIFA nationality.

No.	Pos.	Nation	Player
0	GK	USA	Nickolas Clark
1	GK	USA	Mark Torguson
2	MF	PHI	Ralph Cazel
3	MF	USA	Matt Scammaca
4	DF	CRC	Raymond Harris
5	DF	USA	Dario Cordova
6	MF	USA	Donald Ribaudo
7	MF	USA	Scott Lucky
9	FW	USA	Anthony Chimienti
10	FW	USA	Jimmy Frazelle
11	FW	USA	Patrick Nelle
12	MF	MEX	Marco Ramirez
13	FW	USA	Jeff Neuner
14	MF	USA	James Micah Howser
15	FW	USA	Alfredo Renteria
16	DF	USA	Michael Elenz-Martin

No.	Pos.	Nation	Player
17	DF	USA	Laith Sikta
19	MF	MEX	Pedro Lupercio
21	FW	USA	Chris Ciampa
22	DF	USA	Eliseo Lopez Jr.
23	FW	USA	Jorge Fernandez
24	FW	USA	Elliot Ricks-Chambers
25	MF	USA	Levi Henson
26	FW	USA	Arturo Barragan
27	DF	USA	Utodi Madu
29	DF	PER	Jorge Lama
31	DF	USA	Todd Simmons
36	MF	USA	Ozzie Perez
18	MF	USA	Trinidad Enriquez

== Year-by-year ==
Year	Division	League	Reg. season	Playoffs	Open Cup
2004	4	MPSL	7th	Did not qualify	Second Round
2005	4	NPSL	1st, West	Semi Finals	Did not qualify
2006	4	NPSL	1st, Northwest	Champions	Did not qualify
2007	4	NPSL	2nd, Northwest	Did not qualify	Did not qualify

== Honors ==
- NPSL Champions 2006
- NPSL Northwest Division Champions 2006
- NPSL West Division Champions 2005

== Head coaches ==
- (United States) Ron Preble (2003–2007)
- (England) Chris Hawken (Vice President Operations 2003–2005 & Interim Co-Head Coach 2005)

== Stadia ==
- Stadium at Cosumnes River College; Sacramento, California (2003–2007)
- Stadium at Folsom High School; Folsom, California (2009–present)
