= Maine Sting =

- Full name: Maine Sting
- Nickname: The Sting
- Founded: 2008
- Dissolved: 2010
- Ground: John Boucher Soccer Field at Husson University
- Capacity: 500
- League: National Premier Soccer League
- 2009: Regular Season: 3rd, Atlantic; Playoffs: did not qualify
Home colors	Away colors

Maine Sting were an American soccer soccer team based at Husson University in Bangor, Maine, United States from 2008 to 2010. The team played in the Eastern Atlantic Division of the National Premier Soccer League (NPSL), a national amateur league at the fourth tier of the American Soccer Pyramid.

The Sting played home games at the John Boucher Soccer Field on the campus of Husson College. The team's colors were sky blue, white, and gold.

== Year-by-year ==
Year	League	Division	Regular season	Playoffs	Open Cup
2008	NPSL	4	4th, North	Did not qualify	Did not qualify
2009	NPSL	4	3rd, Atlantic	Did not qualify	Did not enter

== Head coaches ==
- (United States) Bill Ashby (2008)
- (Finland) Jukka Masalin (2009–2010)

== Stadia ==
- John Boucher Soccer Field at Husson College; Bangor, Maine (2008–2010)
