= Bavarian United SC =

American soccer team

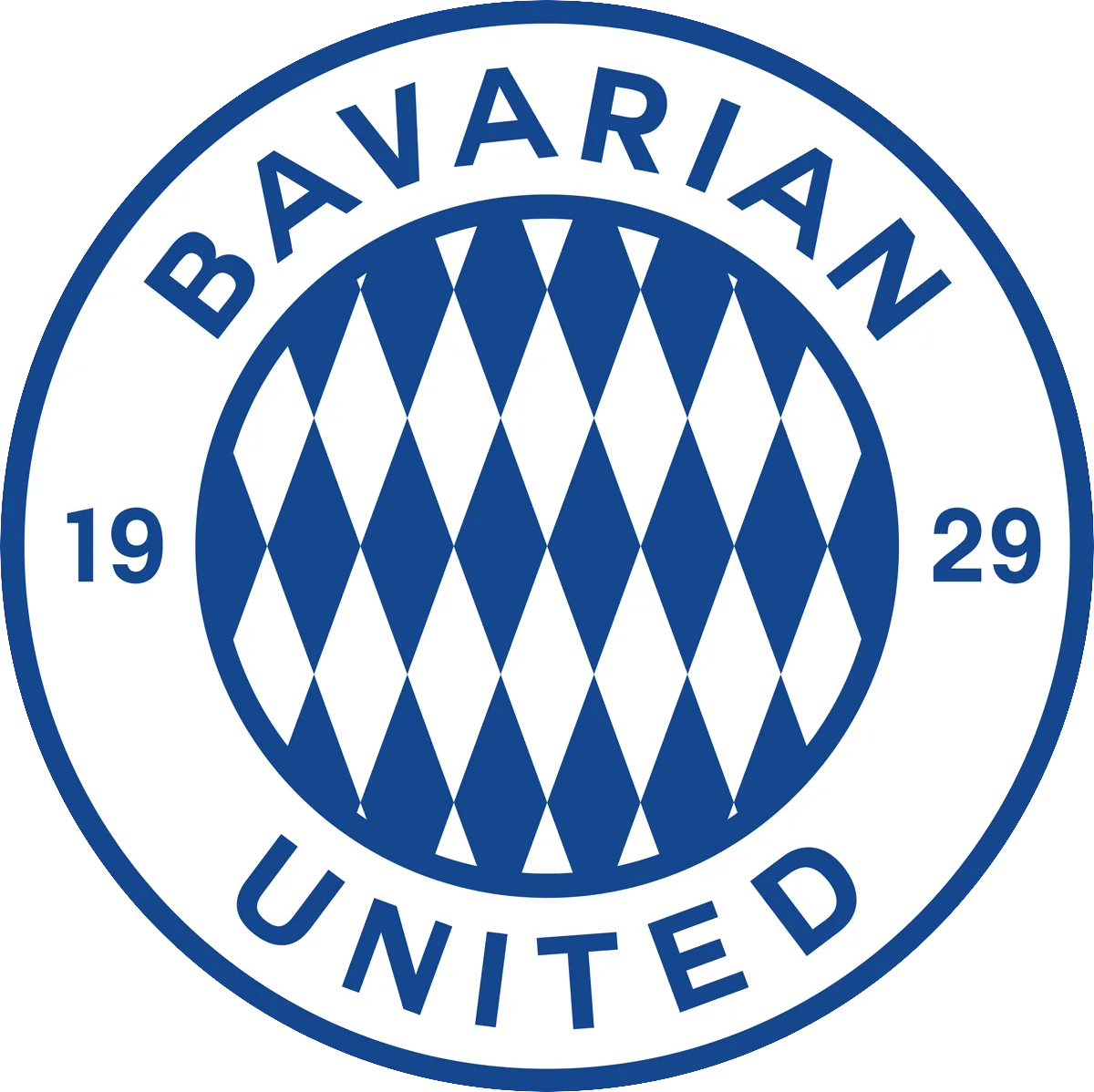
- Full name: Bavarian United Soccer Club
- Nickname: Bavarian
- Founded: 1929; 97 years ago
- Stadium: Heartland Value Fund Stadium; Glendale, Wisconsin
- Capacity: 2,000
- Board President: David Anzia
- Head Coach: Calum Mallace
- League: USL League Two
- 2023: 7th, Deep North Division; Playoffs: DNQ
- Website: bavarianunited.com
Home colors	Away colors

Bavarian United SC is an American soccer team based in Milwaukee, Wisconsin, United States. Bavarian Majors of the Bavarian Soccer Club compete in the USL League 2. The team plays its home games in the athletic stadium at the Heartland Value Fund Stadium. The team's colors are blue and white. Bavarian has won six USASA National Amateur Cup titles as well as two National Open Cup championships and is a frequent qualifier for the Lamar Hunt U.S. Open Cup.

== History ==
The original Milwaukee Bavarians club was formed by German American immigrants in 1929 as Fussball Club Bayern (Football Club Bavaria) as a multi-sports association. Their first soccer match was played on September 29, 1929 against a team from nearby Sheboygan, resulting in a 3–2 victory for Bayern. The club subsequently became very strong in its area, winning many state championships.

In 1956, the team renamed to Milwaukee Bavarian SC and bought a new field on which to play home matches. They were a charter member of the National Premier Soccer League in 2005. The team took a hiatus from the NPSL for the 2014 season to focus on completing substantial upgrades to their Heartland Value Fund Stadium. The total upgrades estimated to cost $1.1 million. At the end of that hiatus, they joined the Great Lakes Premier League, which changed its name to the Premier League of America shortly thereafter.

In their first season in the PLA, the Bavarians won both the West Division and League Championships, and had five players named to the West Division Team of the Year.

In 2021, Milwaukee Bavarian merged with Inter Northshore FC and renamed to Bavarian United SC. On February 7, 2023, it was announced that Bavarian would be joining USL League Two and USL W League for the upcoming 2023 season.

=== National Championships ===
Bavarian Soccer Club has won nine national championships. In 1976 they won their first National Amateur Cup, when they defeated a team from Trenton, New Jersey 3–1 in the final. They repeated this success in 2001, 2002, 2003, 2018, and 2022. They have also finished as runners-up in this tournament (1983, 2016, and 2017).

In 2018, the Bavarians won the United Premier Soccer League (UPSL) national championship, defeating Sporting AZ FC 3–2 in the championship.

In 2003 the Bavarians also won the USASA National Open Cup amateur championship. The club would win the competition again in 2009. USASA eliminated this national tournament in 2015.

Bavarian SC competed in the 1994 U.S. Open Cup as "Bavarian Leinenkugel" as they were sponsored by the Jacob Leinenkugel Brewing Company that year.

== Current squad ==
As of March 2023

Note: Flags indicate national team as defined under FIFA eligibility rules; some limited exceptions apply. Players may hold more than one non-FIFA nationality.

No.	Pos.	Nation	Player
1	GK	USA	Agustín Rey
2	MF	USA	Mathew Yang
3	FW	USA	Joseph Raasch
4	DF	USA	Jacob Streicher
5	DF	USA	Alex Mirsberger
6	DF	USA	Bret Dietz
7	MF	USA	Logan Andryk
8	MF	USA	Alejandro Pacheco
9	MF	USA	Ivan Cuellar

No.	Pos.	Nation	Player
10	MF	MEX	Jose Gutierrez
11	FW	USA	Braden Andryk
12	DF	USA	Joseph Haines
13	MF	USA	John Bradford
14	FW	NGR	Dogara Zamani
17	DF	USA	Buran Huseini
19	MF	USA	Matthew Comiskey
20	MF	USA	Michael Russell
31	MF	USA	Nathan Watkins

== Year-by-year ==
Year	League	Regular season	Playoffs	U.S. Open Cup	National Amateur Cup
1976				Unknown	Champions
1983				Unknown	Runners-up
1993				Semifinals	
1994				Runners-up	
1999				First round	
2000				First round	
2001				did not qualify	Champions
2002				did not qualify	Champions
2003				Third round	Champions
2004				First round	
2005	NPSL	2nd, Midwest		did not qualify	
2006	NPSL	4th, Midwest	did not qualify	did not qualify	
2007	NPSL	2nd, Midwest	did not qualify	Second round	
2008	NPSL	4th, Midwest	did not qualify	did not qualify	
2009	USASA	N/A	N/A	First round	
2010	NPSL	4th, Midwest	did not qualify	did not qualify	
2011	NPSL	1st, Midwest	National Semifinals	did not qualify	
2012	NPSL	2nd, Midwest-Central	did not qualify	First round	
2013	NPSL	2nd, Midwest-Central	did not qualify	did not qualify	
2014	On hiatus				
2015	On hiatus				
2016	PLA	1st, West	Champions	did not qualify	Runners-up
2017	PLA	2nd, West	Champions	did not qualify	Runners-up
2018	UPSL	1st, Midwest-North	Champions	did not qualify	Champions
2019	UPSL Spring	1st, Midwest-Central	National Semifinals	First round	Region II finals
2020				canceled	canceled
2021	MWPL	1st, Western	no playoffs	canceled	Region II semifinals
2022	MWPL	1st, Western	no playoffs	did not qualify	Champions
2023	USL2	7th, Deep North	did not qualify	First round	Region II finals
2024	USL2	2nd, Deep North	Conference Quarterfinals	did not qualify	Region II finals
2025	UPSL Spring	3rd, Midwest Central – North	did not qualify	did not qualify	Region II Quarterfinals
2025	UPSL Fall			did not qualify	Region II Quarterfinals
2026				Did not enter	Region II 1st Round
2027				3rd Qualifying Round	

== Honors ==
=== League ===
- UPSL National Playoffs
  - Winner (1): 2018 Spring
- PLA Playoffs
  - Winner (2): 2016, 2017
- Midwest Premier League West Division
  - Winner (2): 2021, 2022
- UPSL Midwest Conference North Division
  - Winner (1): 2018 Spring
- UPSL Midwest Conference Playoffs
  - Winner (1): 2018 Spring
- UPSL Midwest Central Division
  - Winner (1): 2019 Spring
- UPSL Midwest Conference Playoffs
  - Winner (1): 2019 Spring
- NPSL Midwest Division
  - Winner (1): 2011
  - Runners-up (2): 2005, 2007
- NPSL Midwest-Central Conference
  - Runners-up (2): 2012, 2013
- PLA West Division
  - Winner (1): 2016
  - Runners-up (1): 2017

=== Cup ===
- Lamar Hunt U.S. Open Cup
  - Runners-up (1): 1994
- USASA Amateur Cup
  - Winner (6): 1976, 2001, 2002, 2003, 2018, 2022
  - Runners-up (3): 1983, 2016, 2017
- USASA Werner Fricker Open Cup
  - Winner (2): 2003, 2009 (National competition ceased after 2015)
- Hank Steinbrecher Cup
  - 4th Place (1): 2019

== Head coaches ==
- (United States) Tom Zaiss (1996–2006)
- (United States) Jon Mroz (2007–2008)
- (Germany) Andreas Davi (2009–2011)
- (United States) Patrick Hodgins (2012–present)

== Stadium ==
- Heartland Value Fund Stadium; Glendale, Wisconsin (1950–present)
