= Real Shore F.C. =

Real Shore FC
- Full name: Real Shore FC
- Founded: 2006
- Dissolved: 2007
- Stadium: Brookdale Community College
- Chairman: Mike Lyons
- Manager: Roger Bongaerts
- League: National Premier Soccer League
- 2007: inaugural season
Home colours	Away colours

Real Shore FC was an American soccer team, founded in 2006. The team was a member of the National Premier Soccer League (NPSL), and played in the Eastern Conference. The team folded after the 2007 season.

The team played its home games in the stadium at Brookdale Community College in Lincroft, New Jersey, in the Jersey Shore area of the state of New Jersey. The team was affiliated with the long-established WPSL team of the same name.
