= Boston Tea Men =

- Full name: Boston Tea Men
- Nickname: Tea Men
- Founded: 2009
- Ground: Merrimack College; North Andover, Massachusetts
- Owner: Cheryl Stokes
- Head Coach: Tony Martone
Home colors	Away colors

The Boston Tea Men were an American soccer team based in North Andover, Massachusetts, United States. Founded in 2009, the team played in the National Premier Soccer League (NPSL), a national amateur league at the fourth tier of the American Soccer Pyramid, in the Northeast Atlantic Division.

The team played its home games in the stadium on the campus of Merrimack College. The team's colors are white, blue and red.

As of February 2011 the team appears to have folded, with the NPSL website no longer listing it nor its own website being active.

== History ==
The Tea Men are a quasi-reincarnation of the former New England Tea Men, who played in the old North American Soccer League from 1978 to 1980 and still have a strong recognition in the Boston soccer community.

== Players ==
=== 2010 Roster ===
Note: Flags indicate national team as defined under FIFA eligibility rules; some limited exceptions apply. Players may hold more than one non-FIFA nationality.

No.	Pos.	Nation	Player
—	DF	USA	Michael Allen
—	GK	USA	Taylor Bracken
—	FW	USA	Ben Brewster
—	DF	USA	Jonathan Brockway
—	GK	USA	Doug Carvalho
—	MF	USA	Mark Cotton
—	DF	USA	Paul D'Angelo
—	DF	USA	Michael Doherty
—	FW	USA	Paul Fomenky
—	MF	USA	Joey Hattis
—	DF	USA	Drew Holland

No.	Pos.	Nation	Player
—	DF	USA	Grayson Holland
—	FW	USA	Jared Joaquin
—	FW	IRL	Christopher Nugent
—	MF	USA	Shane O'Neill
—	MF	USA	Russell Oost-Lievense
—	DF	USA	John O'Reilly
—	MF	USA	Vincent Papageorgiou
—	FW	USA	Emmanuel Paye
—	DF	USA	James Pelletier
—	MF	USA	Christian Rodriguez
—	FW	USA	Lee Russo

== Year-by-year ==
Year	Division	League	Regular season	Playoffs	Open Cup
2010	4	NPSL	6th, Atlantic	Did not qualify	Did not enter

== Head coaches ==
- (United States) Tony Martone (2010–present)

== Stadia ==
- Stadium at Merrimack College; North Andover, Massachusetts (2010–present)
