= Southern California Fusion =

San Diego Fusion
- Full name: Southern California San Diego Fusion
- Founded: 2004
- Dissolved: 2007; 19 years ago
- Ground: Aviara Park, Carlsbad, CA
- League: NPSL; PASL (indoor)
- 2007: 1st, Champions
Home colours

Southern California San Diego Fusion were an American soccer team, founded in 2006, which competed in the National Premier Soccer League (NPSL), the fourth division of the American Soccer Pyramid until 2007 when, despite being the reigning NPSL champions, the franchise chose to leave the league.

In 2007, the team played their home matches at Aviara Park in the city of Carlsbad, California, 35 miles north of downtown San Diego. The team's colors were black, red, white and gold.

The team also fielded an indoor team from 2004 to 2011 in the Premier Arena Soccer League.

== Year-by-year ==
Year	Division	League	Reg. season	Playoffs	Open Cup
2006	4	NPSL	2nd, Southwest	Did not qualify	Did not qualify
2007	4	NPSL	1st, Southwest	Champions	Did not qualify

== Honors ==
- NPSL Champions 2007
- NPSL Southwest Division Champions 2007
