= Jersey Blues FC =

Jersey Blues
- Full name: Jersey Blues Football Club
- Founded: 2007
- Ground: Robert T. Shields Field; Madison, New Jersey
- Capacity: 1,000
- Owner: (United States) New Jersey Soccer Group
- Head Coach: (England) Tom Worthington
- League: National Premier Soccer League
- 2013: 7th, Keystone Conference; Playoffs: DNQ
Home colors	Away colors

Jersey Blues FC was an American soccer team based in Morristown, New Jersey, United States. Founded in 2007, the team plays in the National Premier Soccer League (NPSL), the fourth tier of the American Soccer Pyramid, in the Keystone Conference. From the team's founding until the 2015 season, it was known as Morris County Colonials. In May 2015, the name and branding change to Jersey Blues FC was announced.

The team plays its home games at Robert T. Shields Field on the campus of Fairleigh Dickinson University College at Florham in nearby Madison, New Jersey. The team's colors as the Morris County Colonials were burgundy, white and gold, but switched to white and blue after the team's identity was switched to Jersey Blues FC.

The Colonials organization is owned and operated by the New Jersey Soccer Group, a management company for a family of soccer-based companies offering soccer services in New Jersey.

== Players ==
=== 2012 Roster ===
Source: [1]

Note: Flags indicate national team as defined under FIFA eligibility rules; some limited exceptions apply. Players may hold more than one non-FIFA nationality.

No.	Pos.	Nation	Player
—	GK	USA	Kevin Bonder
—	GK	USA	Eric Klenofsky
—	GK	USA	Carl Spence
—	DF	ENG	Will Broomfield
—	DF	USA	Luis Granizo
—	DF	SCO	Tam McGowan
—	DF	SCO	Adam Mitchinson
—	DF	USA	Dan Sauerhoff
—	DF	USA	Coron Short
—	DF	USA	Chris Vaccaro
—	DF	ENG	Andy Wilkinson
—	MF	USA	JP Berr
—	MF	USA	Marco DiNello

No.	Pos.	Nation	Player
—	MF	PHI	Christopher Greatwich
—	MF	PHI	Simon Greatwich
—	MF	USA	Stephen Krachie
—	MF	USA	Mario Maggia
—	MF	USA	Josh Spivack
—	MF	USA	Kharee Winslow
—	FW	TRI	Kester Guischard
—	FW	ENG	Luke Huggett
—	FW	GER	Ekene Okereke
—	FW	USA	Nye Winslow

=== Former players ===
- (United States) Samuel Bryant (2009)
- (Portugal) Hugo Ferreira (2008)
- (Spain) Miguel Fontan (2008–09)
- (United States) Steve Jakubowski (2009–11)
- (United States) Ansger Otto (2009)
- (United States) Leroy Sequeira (2008)
- (United States) Daniel Sauerhoff (1801-1805)
- (Spain) Edwardo Sanchez (2008–09)
- (Spain) Paco de Lucía (2008–09)
- (Spain) Joselito (2008–09)
- (Spain) Hernán Cortés (2008–09)
- (United States) Doug Funny (2009)
- (United States) Forrest Whiteside (2009)
- (United States) Don Finklestein (2008)
- (Brazil) Leandro Fioretti (2008)

== Year-by-year ==
Year	Division	League	Regular season	Playoffs	Open Cup
2008	4	NPSL	5th, North	Did not qualify	Did not qualify
2009	4	NPSL	4th, Atlantic	Did not qualify	Did not enter
2010	4	NPSL	4th, Atlantic	Did not qualify	Did not enter
2011	4	NPSL	5th, Atlantic	Did not qualify	Did not enter
2012	4	NPSL	2nd, Atlantic	Division Semi-Finals	Did not enter
2013	4	NPSL	7th, Atlantic	Did not qualify	Did not enter
2014	Withdrew, Self Relegated to US Club Soccer National Adult League, North East Premier Division				
2015	4	6th, Keystone	"Did not qualify"	"Did not enter"	

== Head coaches ==
- (United States) Adrian Borrows (2008)
- (England) Rob Alman (2009–2011)
- (England) John Ryan (2011)
- (England) Christopher Greatwich (2012)
- (England) Tom Worthington (2012–Present)

== Home stadiums ==
- Burke Field at Morristown-Beard School, Morristown, New Jersey (2008)
- Dr Keith A. Neigel Field at Millburn High School, Millburn, New Jersey (2009)
- Robert T. Shields Field at Fairleigh Dickinson University College at Florham; Madison, New Jersey (2010–2013)
- Drew University Ranger Stadium at Drew University, Madison, New Jersey (2015–present)
