= Long Island Academy =

- Full name: Long Island Academy
- Nickname: The Academy
- Founded: 2006
- Ground: Competition Field; Garden City, New York
- Capacity: 1,600
- Owner: (United States) Paul Riley
- Head Coach: (United States) Terry Uellendahl
- League: National Premier Soccer League
- 2010: 7th, Atlantic; Playoffs: DNQ
Home colors	Away colors

Long Island Academy is an American soccer team based in Hempstead, New York, United States. Founded in 2006, the team plays in the National Premier Soccer League (NPSL), a national amateur league at the fourth tier of the American Soccer Pyramid, in the Northeast Atlantic Division.

The team plays its home games on the Competition Field on the campus of Adelphi University in nearby Garden City, New York, where they have played since 2007. The team's colors are red, navy blue, and white.

The team also has a sister organization, the Long Island Fury, which plays in the WPSL.

== Year-by-year ==
Year	Division	League	Regular season	Playoffs	Open Cup
2007	4	NPSL	3rd, Northeast	Did not qualify	Did not qualify
2008	4	NPSL	1st, Mid Atlantic	Semi Final	Did not qualify
2009	4	NPSL	2nd, Atlantic	Did not qualify	Did not enter
2010	4	NPSL	7th, Atlantic	Did not qualify	Did not enter

== Honors ==
=== Domestic ===
- National Premier Soccer League
- Northeast - Atlantic Division (NPSL):
  - Winners (1): 2008

== Head coaches ==
- (United States) Paul Riley (2007–2008)
- (United States) Adrian Gaitan (2009)
- (United States) Terry Uellendahl (2010–present)

== Stadia ==
- Competition Field at Adelphi University; Garden City, New York (2007–present)
- Mitchel Athletic Complex; Uniondale, New York 2 games (2010)
