= Santa Cruz Breakers FC =

American soccer team

Breakers FC
- Full name: Breakers FC
- Nickname: Breakers
- Founded: 1992
- President: Lepa Galeb-Roskopp
- Coach: Zoran Djurić; Matthieu Delcroix; Mike Runeare; Sergi Tortell Turon; Daniel Ortega; Mark Christies
- League: MLS Next
- Website: https://www.breakers-fc.com/
Home colors	Away colors

Breakers FC is an American soccer club based in Santa Cruz, California, United States founded in 1992. The team's colors are dark blue, sky blue, gold and white.

In 2007 and 2008, Breakers FC fielded teams in the National Premier Soccer League (NPSL), a national amateur league at the fourth tier of the American Soccer Pyramid. In 2018 the club began fielding a team in the Premier Development League, now known as USL League Two, playing its home games at Carl Conelly Stadium on the campus of Cabrillo College in Aptos, California.

The club is a founding member of the Elite Youth Development Platform with partner Major League Soccer in 2020. The club signed Niša Saveljić to be their director of coaching in June 2020.

== Leadership ==
- President: (United States) USA - Lepa Galeb-Roskopp
- Vice-President: (United States) USA - Rob Roskopp
- Sports Director: Montenegro - Niša Saveljić
- Director of Methodology: France - Stéphane D'Urbano
- Coaches:
  - Serbia - Zoran Djuric
  - France - Matthieu Delcroix
  - (United States) USA - Michael Runeare
  - (United States) USA - Tim Martin
  - Spain - Sergi Tortell Turon
  - (United States) USA - Daniel Ortega
  - Scotland - Mark Christie
  - Peru - Johnny Olaya
