= Atlantic City Diablos =

- Full name: Atlantic City Diablos
- Nickname: The Diablos
- Founded: 2007
- Stadium: St. Augustine Prep School
- Capacity: 6,200
- Chairman: (Scotland) Matt Driver
- Manager: (United States) Greg Ruttler
- League: National Premier Soccer League
- 2008: 5th, Mid-Atlantic Division
Home colors	Away colors

The Atlantic City Diablos were an American soccer team based in Atlantic City, New Jersey, United States. Founded in 2007, the team played in the National Premier Soccer League (NPSL), a national amateur league at the fourth tier of the American Soccer Pyramid, until 2008, when the franchise folded and the team left the league.

The team played its home games in the athletic stadium at St. Augustine College Preparatory School in nearby Richland, New Jersey. The team's colors were blue, gold, and white.

The Diablos were owned by Team Dynamics LLC, a successful organization dedicated to soccer education and player development at all age levels. Team Dynamics LLC also maintained a team in the Women's Premier Soccer League (WPSL), also called the Atlantic City Diablos.

== Players ==
=== 2008 roster ===
Note: Flags indicate national team as defined under FIFA eligibility rules; some limited exceptions apply. Players may hold more than one non-FIFA nationality.

No.	Pos.	Nation	Player
—	GK	USA	Chris Ashiotes
—	MF	USA	Rich Baker
—	DF	USA	Nick Canderan
—	MF	USA	John Castro
—	MF	USA	Matt Frey
—	GK	USA	Ned Hunt
—	DF	USA	Evan Jeap
—	FW	USA	Roger Kummer
—	GK	USA	Duhan Malali
—	FW	ZAM	Samson Malijani
—	MF	USA	Chris Marciano
—	MF	USA	Jeff Moore

No.	Pos.	Nation	Player
—	DF	USA	James Pounder
—	FW	USA	Brian Raffle
—	DF	USA	Ryan Roberts
—	DF	USA	Ryan Scully
—	MF	USA	Shane Seabrook
—	DF	USA	Rich Stone
—	MF	USA	Billy Swerta
—	MF	USA	Pat Tolomeo
—	MF	USA	Nico Tramontana
—	MF	USA	Mike Trenard
—	FW	USA	Damon Wilson
—	FW	USA	Sean Wise
—	FW	USA	Nucky Thompson

== Year-by-year ==
Year	Division	League	Regular season	Playoffs	Open Cup
2007	4	NPSL	2nd, Northeast	Did not qualify	Did not qualify
2008	4	NPSL	5th, Mid-Atlantic	Did not qualify	Did not qualify

== Head coaches ==
- (Scotland) Matt Driver (2007)
- (United States) Greg Ruttler (2008)

== Stadia ==
- Stadium at St. Augustine College Preparatory School; Richland, New Jersey (2008)
