= Boston Aztec =

- Full name: Boston Aztec
- Nickname: The Aztecs
- Founded: 2006
- Stadium: Amesbury Sports Park
- Chairman: (United States) Mike Kersker
- Manager: (United States) Jeff Winterton
- League: National Premier Soccer League
- 2009: Regular Season: 1st, Atlantic; Playoffs: Divisional Finals
Home colors	Away colors

Boston Aztec was an American soccer team based in Amesbury, Massachusetts, United States.

Founded in 2006, the team played in the National Premier Soccer League (NPSL), a national amateur league at the fourth tier of the American Soccer Pyramid, in the Eastern Atlantic Division. The team's colors were red and black.

The team was operated by the Aztec Soccer Club, which also operates a Women's Premier Soccer League team called Boston Aztec.

The team played its home games at Amesbury Sports Park in nearby Amesbury, Massachusetts in its final season, 2009.

== Players ==
=== Final roster ===
as at June 7, 2009 Note: Flags indicate national team as defined under FIFA eligibility rules; some limited exceptions apply. Players may hold more than one non-FIFA nationality.

No.	Pos.	Nation	Player
—	FW	USA	John Bavota
—	MF	USA	Matt Bengston
—	DF	USA	Jon Brockway
—	DF	USA	Michael Cafeteiro
—	MF	USA	Paul D'Angelo
—	MF	BRA	Diogenes De Souza
—	FW	USA	Andrew Doherty
—	MF	USA	Chris Ethier
—	FW	USA	Matthew Figueiredo
—	MF	USA	Nick Figueiredo
—	DF	USA	Christian Figueroa
—	DF	USA	Patrick Hamilton
—	FW	LBR	Ali Kaba

No.	Pos.	Nation	Player
—	GK	USA	Ted Kakambouras
—	MF	GUI	Mo Keita
—	GK	USA	Peter Kersker
—	DF	USA	Bryan Lee
—	FW	USA	Matt Lemire
—	MF	USA	Jack Lindsay
—	FW	GAB	Antoine Moiboueyi
—	MF	USA	James Phillips
—	MF	BRA	Rafael Santos
—	MF	CMR	Karl Tegha
—	DF	USA	John Twomey
—	MF	KEN	James Wangia
—	MF	ANG	Christian Yulu

== Year-by-year ==
Year	Division	League	Regular season	Playoffs	Open Cup
2007	4	NPSL	4th, Northeast	Did not qualify	Did not qualify
2008	4	NPSL	2nd, North	Did not qualify	Did not qualify
2009	4	NPSL	1st, Atlantic	Divisional Finals	Did not enter

== Honors ==
- NPSL Atlantic Division Champions 2009

== Head coaches ==
- (United States) Jeff Winterton, Mike Kersker (2007–present)

== Stadia ==
- Cushing Field at University of Massachusetts Lowell; Lowell, Massachusetts (2007–2008)
- Amesbury Sports Park; Amesbury, Massachusetts (2009)
