= Indios USA =

- Full name: El Paso Texas Indios USA
- Nicknames: Los Indios, The Tribe
- Founded: 2007
- Ground: Canutillo Stadium
- Capacity: 12,000
Home colors	Away colors

Indios USA was an American soccer team based in El Paso, Texas, United States. Founded in 2007, the team played in the National Premier Soccer League (NPSL), a national amateur league at the fourth tier of the American Soccer Pyramid, until 2008, when the franchise folded and the team left the league.

The team played its home games at Canutillo Stadium on the campus of Canutillo High School in nearby Canutillo, Texas. The team's colors were red and white.

The team spent the 2008 season on hiatus while the club's finances and infrastructure were reorganized before ceasing operations in 2009.

The club was affiliated with the Mexican soccer club Indios de Ciudad Juarez, who played just across the border in the city of Ciudad Juárez in the Primera División de México.

== Year-by-year ==
Year	Division	League	Regular season	Playoffs	Open Cup
2007	4	NPSL	2nd, Southwest	Did not qualify	First Round
2008	4	NPSL	on hiatus		

== Head coaches ==
- (United States) Jesus Chuy Enriquez (2007)

== Stadia ==
- Canutillo Stadium; Canutillo, Texas (2007)
