= Rocket City United =

- Full name: Rocket City United
- Founded: 2007
- Ground: John Hunt Soccer Stadium; Huntsville, Alabama
- Capacity: 7,000
Home colours	Away colours

Rocket City United (RCU) was an American soccer team based in Huntsville, Alabama, United States. Founded in 2007, the team formerly played in the National Premier Soccer League (NPSL), a national Semi-Professional league (where some teams and players were on full time contracts) at the fourth tier of the American Soccer Pyramid, in the Southeast Division. Rocket City United announced it would go on hiatus and not field a team for the 2015 NPSL season. The franchise was subsequently replaced by other clubs and later folded. A youth academy program that was connected to Rocket City United still continues under the same name.

The team played its home games at John Hunt Soccer Stadium in Huntsville, Alabama. Home games were also played at Madison City Schools Stadium in Madison, Alabama from 2010 to 2012. The team's colors were red, black, and white.

== History ==
The team had a rich history of attracting collegiate footballers who wanted to play during the college off season, or after college in the bid to try and progress up the ladder. RCU attracted players from all over the United States and as far as Brasil, England, Ireland, Scotland, Uganda, South Africa and more. The team bond was unquestionable.

In 2010 RCU appointed USA Hall of Famer Des Armstrong. This brought huge credibility and put Huntsville under the spot light.

Under Armstrong's stewardship the team played an expansive form of football.

The 2010 campaign coincided with the 2010 World Cup, so Vuvuzela's were a common sound at home games.

== Year-by-year ==
Year	Division	League	Regular season	Playoffs	Open Cup
2008	4	NPSL	3rd, Southeast	Did not qualify	Did not enter
2009	4	NPSL	1st, Southeast	National Semi Finals	Did not qualify
2010	4	NPSL	3rd, Southeast	Did not qualify	Did not qualify
2011	4	NPSL	6th, Southeast	Did not qualify	Did not qualify
2012	4	NPSL	3rd, South-Southeast-West	Did not qualify	Did not qualify
2013	4	NPSL	3rd, Southeast	Did not qualify	Did not qualify

== Honors ==
- NPSL Southeast Division Champions 2009

== Head coaches ==
- (United States) Greg Petersen (2008–2009)
- (United States) Desmond Armstrong (2010)
- (Republic of Ireland) Gerry Cleary (2011–2014)
- (Botswana) Jacob Letsholo (2014)

== Stadia ==
- John Hunt Soccer Stadium; Huntsville, Alabama (2008–09, 2013–14)
- Jack Allen Soccer Complex; Decatur, Alabama (2 games) (2008)
- Madison City Schools Stadium; Madison, Alabama (2010–12)
