= Indy Eleven NPSL =

- Founded: 2007
- Dissolved: 2016
- Ground: Grand Park
- Capacity: 1,000
- Executive director: Mark Webber
- Head Coach: John Simmonds
- League: National Premier Soccer League

Indy Eleven NPSL was an American soccer team based in Westfield, Indiana. The team played in National Premier Soccer League (NPSL), a national amateur league at the fourth tier of the American Soccer Pyramid, in the Midwest Region.

The team played its home games on the turf practice field at Grand Park in Westfield. The team's colors were red and white.

The team was initially known as the Rockford Raptors before moving to the Chicago area to become the Chicago Fire NPSL. They later moved to Indiana to become the Indiana Fire before switching their affiliation to North American Soccer League club Indy Eleven.

== History ==
The team began as an offshoot of the Rockford Raptors organization, who were members of the old USISL in the early 1990s, and played for seven seasons in the USISL Pro League and USL Premier Development League, reaching the Conference Playoffs on two occasions before leaving the league at the end of the 2000 season.

The team re-formed in 2007 and played their first season in the National Premier Soccer League in Rockford, Illinois as the Raptors, before moving to Bridgeview prior to the 2008 season after signing a formal agreement to become an official development program for the Chicago Fire Major League Soccer programme. The Chicago Fire played through the 2011 season, ending the NPSL program.

In January 2014 the NPSL announced the addition of the Westfield Youth Soccer Association (WYSA). On May 30, 2014, WYSA merged with the Carmel United SC to form the Indiana Fire Juniors Soccer Club, a Chicago Fire Soccer Club affiliate.

The team did not return after the 2016 season.

== Year-by-year ==
Year	W–T–L	Reg. season	Playoffs	Open Cup
2007	3–6–1	5th, Midwest	Did not qualify	Did not qualify
2008	3–1–2	2nd (tie), Midwest	Did not qualify	Did not qualify
2009	5–2–1	1st (tie), Midwest	Did not qualify	Did not enter
2010	5–1–3	2nd, Midwest	Did not qualify	Did not enter
2011	4–3–5	5th, Midwest	Did not qualify	Did not qualify
2014	7–3–4	3rd, Great Lakes West	Did not qualify	Not eligible
2015	7–2–3	4th, Midwest	National semifinals	Did not qualify
2016	6–1–3	2nd, Great Lakes East	Regional semifinals	2nd Round
TOTALS	40–19–22			

== Head coaches ==
- Brian Roberts (2008–2011)
- John Simmonds (2014–2016)

== Stadium ==
- Toyota Park; Bridgeview, Illinois (2008–2011)
- Grand Park; Westfield, Indiana (2014–2016)
