= 2024 National Amateur Cup =

100th edition of cup competition in American soccer

2024 USASA National Amateur Cup

Tournament details
- Country: United States
- Teams: 58 Men's, 13 Women's

Tournament statistics
- Matches played: 74
- Goals scored: 302 (4.08 per match)
- All statistics correct as of July 9, 2024.

The 2024 National Amateur Cup was the 100th edition of the National Amateur Cup, a knockout cup competition open to amateur teams affiliated with the United States Adult Soccer Association (USASA). It will be the sixth edition of the tournament to award its men's champion a spot in the U.S. Open Cup.

SC MesoAmerica (CA) and NTX Image (TX) were the defending Men's and Women's National Amateur Cup champions, respectively. However, SC MesoAmerica did not participate in regional qualifying while NTX Image failed to defend their Region III title.

New York Pancyprian-Freedoms (NY) won the men's title, while Pan World Elite WFC (UT) won the women's title.

== Format ==
Each of the USASA's four regions hold qualifying tournaments to determine a regional champion. The format of the qualifying tournament is left to the discretion of each region, though a single-elimination tournament is the most common format used. The four regional champions then compete in a single-elimination tournament at a neutral location to determine the national champion.

== Region I ==
=== Men's ===
In total, 16 teams across seven state associations (Note: Providence City FC qualified for the tournament as a member of the Massachusetts Adult State Soccer Association. However the team is based out of Providence, Rhode Island and listed as such in the bracket.) in USASA Region I and the National Premier Soccer League sent representatives to the tournament for the Fitz Marth Amateur Cup. The Eastern Premier Soccer League was the most represented league in the region with six teams participating. New York, Pennsylvania, and Virginia were tied for the most represented state in the tournament with each having three teams taking part.

The final of the regional tournament took place on June 15 at the Ukrainian American Sports Center in North Wales, Pennsylvania.

Bracket

Home teams listed on top of bracket (Note: With the final being held at a neutral location, "home team" isn't factored into the bracket layout. Officially, Christos FC was designated as the home team for the Region I Final.)

First Round; April 7–14	Quarterfinals; April 27–28
NJ	SC Vistula Garfield	1
**NY**	**New York Shockers**	**2**
NY	New York Shockers	2
**RI**	**Providence City FC**	**3***
NY	NY Greek American	(Note: NY Greek American protested due to field conditions, protest failed, NY Greek American had abandoned match. Providence City FC advanced.)
**RI**	**Providence City FC**	**FF**
**North**
**CT**	**Newtown Pride FC**	**2**
MA	Sete de Setembro	0
CT	Newtown Pride FC	1
**NY**	**NY Pancyprian-Freedoms**	**6**
**NY**	**NY Pancyprian-Freedoms**	**3 (5)**
NJ	Hoboken FC 1912	3 (3)
**VA**	**Club Atlético Los Toros**	**6 (Note: Ended in the 77th minute)**
PA	Lancaster City FC	0
VA	Club Atlético Los Toros	0
**MD**	**Christos FC**	**3**
VA	Alexandria Reds	1 (2)
**MD**	**Christos FC**	**2 (4)**
**South**
PA	West Chester United	0
**MD**	**Steel Pulse FC**	**1**
**MD**	**Steel Pulse FC**	**2**
PA	Vereinigung Erzgebirge	1
**PA**	**Vereinigung Erzgebirge**	**3**
VA	Virginia Marauders FC	1

Semifinals; May 19
RI	Providence City FC	1
**NY**	**NY Pancyprian-Freedoms**	**7**
**MD**	**Christos FC**	**2**
MD	Steel Pulse FC	0

Final; June 15
**NY**	**NY Pancyprian-Freedoms**	**2**
MD	Christos FC	0

Bold = winner
* = after extra time, ( ) = penalty shootout score, FF = forfeit

June 15 Final	Christos FC **(Maryland)**	**0–2**	**(New York (state)) New York Pancyprian-Freedoms**	North Wales, Pennsylvania
		Report	Thristino 2'; Holland 80'	Stadium: Ukrainian American Sports Center, Field 6

=== Women's ===
In total, 4 teams across four state associations participated in a round-robin tournament on June 15 and 16 at the Ukrainian American Sports Center in North Wales, Pennsylvania alongside the men's regional final.

Women's Region I Tournament

Pos	Team	Pld	W	D	L	GF	GA	GD	Pts	Final result
1	(New York (state)) Rochester Lazers	3	2	1	0	10	2	+8	**7**	Advance to National Semifinals
2	(Massachusetts) Sidekicks	3	2	1	0	10	3	+7	**7**	
3	(Pennsylvania) Philadelphia Ukrainian Nationals Women	3	0	1	2	1	8	−7	**1**	
4	(New York (state)) Beyond FC Women	3	0	1	2	4	12	−8	**1**	

Rules for classification: 1) points; 2) head to head; 3) goal differential; 4) goals for; 5) penalty shootout

Home \ Away	BFW	PUN	RCL	SKS
Beyond FC Women	—	1–1		2–6
Philadelphia Ukrainian Nationals Women		—		0–3
Rochester Lazers	5–1	4–0	—	
Sidekicks			1–1	—

Legend: Blue = home team win; Yellow = draw; Red = away team win.

== Region II ==
=== Men's ===
In total, 24 teams across seven state associations in USASA Region II and the National Premier Soccer League sent representatives to the tournament for the Bill Davey Amateur Cup. The Midwest Premier League was the most represented league in the region with ten teams participating. Illinois was the most represented state in the tournament with ten teams taking part.

The final of the regional tournament took place on June 25. It was hosted by FC Milwaukee Torrent at Hart Park in Wauwatosa, Wisconsin.

Teams won $300 for every knockout round game they won. The Torrent received an additional $1,000 in recognition of their regional championship.

Note: Separate draws were held for rounds 1 and 2, as well as Round 3, the Quarterfinals, Semifinals and Final. Following Round 2, USASA conducted a draw and set the remainder of the bracket.

Bracket

Home teams listed on top of bracket

Round 1 Apr. 14–20
IL	United FC	1
**WI**	**United Serbian SC**	**3**
WI	Honduras FC Majors	(Note: Honduras FC Majors withdrew due to player availability and injuries.)
**IL**	**SAC Wisla Chicago**	**FF**
IL	KICS FC Talara	0
**IL**	**Wisloka Chicago**	**4**
**MI**	**Michigan Stars Semi Pro U23**	**FF**
MI	Teranga Simbas	(Note: Teranga Simbas became ineligible for the tournament after losing their USASA affiliation.)

Round 2 Apr. 14–May 5
WI	Bateaux FC	0
**WI**	**Green Bay Glory**	**3**
**MN**	**Vlora FC**	**FF**
KS	FOCUS FC	(Note: FOCUS FC forfeited due to player availability.)
**IL**	**Czarni Jaslo Chicago**	**2**
IL	Steel City FC	1
WI	United Serbian SC	2
**IL**	**Chicago House AC**	**6**
**IL**	**SAC Wisla Chicago**	**5***
IL	CKS Warta SC	4
**IL**	**Wisloka Chicago**	**2**
IL	Edgewater Castle FC	1
MI	Inter Detroit	0
**MI**	**Michigan Stars Semi Pro U23**	**3**
OH	Valhalla FC	2
**IN**	**Northern Indiana FC**	**3**

Round 3 May 11–20
WI	Green Bay Glory	0
**MN**	**Vlora FC**	**1**
IL	Czarni Jaslo Chicago	1
**IL**	**Chicago House AC**	**3**
IL	SAC Wisla Chicago	1
**IL**	**Wisloka Chicago**	**3***
MI	Michigan Stars Semi Pro U23	0
**IN**	**Northern Indiana FC**	**2**

Quarterfinals; May 28–June 2
IL	RWB Adria	1
**MN**	**Vlora FC**	**4**
**WI**	**FC Milwaukee Torrent**	**6**
IL	Chicago House AC	1
**WI**	**Bavarian United SC**	**2**
IL	Wisloka Chicago	0
**OH**	**Akron City FC**	**4***
IN	Northern Indiana FC	2

Semifinals; June 9–16
MN	Vlora FC	0
**WI**	**FC Milwaukee Torrent**	**1**
**WI**	**Bavarian United SC**	**7***
OH	Akron City FC	5

Final; June 25
**WI**	**FC Milwaukee Torrent**	**1***
WI	Bavarian United SC	0

Bold = winner
* = after extra time, ( ) = penalty shootout score, FF = forfeit

June 26 Final	**FC Milwaukee Torrent (Wisconsin)**	**1–0** (a.e.t.)	**(Wisconsin)** Bavarian United SC	Wauwatosa, Wisconsin
	Own Goal 97'	Report		Stadium: Hart Park

=== Women's ===
In total, four teams from two state associations participated in a single-elimination knockout tournament across late June and early July to determine Region II's women's representative. The bracket included 2021 National Amateur Cup champions Rockford Raptors and 2024 Finals host DeKalb County United. The final was played at Montrose Turf Field in Chicago on July 2.

Semifinal; June 20-23
IL	DeKalb County United	0
**IL**	**Edgewater Castle FC**	**1***
WI	Milwaukee City AFC	1
**IL**	**Rockford Raptors**	**2**

Final; July 2
**Edgewater Castle FC**	**5**
Rockford Raptors	4

Bold = winner * = after extra time, ( ) = penalty shootout score, FF = forfeit

June 20 Semifinal	DeKalb County United **(Illinois)**	**0–1** (a.e.t.)	**(Illinois) Edgewater Castle FC**	DeKalb, Illinois
		Report	Co. Sengstock 100'	Stadium: NIU Soccer and Track & Field Complex

June 23 Semifinal	**Rockford Raptors (Illinois)**	**2–1**	**(Wisconsin)** Milwaukee City AFC	Loves Park, Illinois
		Report	Johnstone 85'	Stadium: Mercyhealth Sportscore Two

July 2 Final	**Edgewater Castle FC (Illinois)**	**5–4**	**(Illinois)** Rockford Raptors	Chicago, Illinois
	Co. Sengstock 5', 45'; Egan 64'; Buechel 69'; Boos 90'	Report	10'; 20'; 43'; 51'	Stadium: Montrose Turf Field

== Region III ==
=== Men's ===
In total, 8 teams across 12 state associations in USASA Region III and the National Premier Soccer League sent representatives to the tournament. (Note: Two teams, FC Brownsville (TX) and Los Migos (TX), were initially slated to compete in the regional but were unable to for undisclosed reasons. They were replaced by Cobb United FC (GA) and NTX Black Ice (TX).) Florida, Georgia, and Texas (one each from the north and south associations) were tied for the most represented state in the tournament with each having two teams taking part.

Region III held its tournament over one weekend on June 7–9 at MESA Soccer Complex in Greer, South Carolina, as opposed to running an extended single-elimination tournament format like Regions I, II, and IV.

Group A

Pos	Team	Pld	W	D	L	GF	GA	GD	Pts	Final result
1	(North Carolina) Tobacco Road FC	3	3	0	0	11	3	+8	**9**	Advance to Region III Final
2	(Georgia (U.S. state)) Terminus FC	3	2	0	1	9	4	+5	**6**	
3	(Florida) OFC Wolves	3	1	0	2	7	9	−2	**3**	
4	(Texas) NTX Black Ice	3	0	0	3	4	15	−11	**0**	

Source: Match reports
Rules for classification: 1) points; 2) head to head; 3) goal differential [capped at a 3-goals per match]; 4) goals for [capped at 3 goals per match]; 5) penalty shootout

Home \ Away	NTX	OFC	TER	TOB
NTX Black Ice	—	3–4		
OFC Wolves		—	1–3	2–3
Terminus FC	5–1		—	
Tobacco Road FC	6–0		2–1	—

Source: Match reports
Legend: Blue = home team win; Yellow = draw; Red = away team win.

Group B

Pos	Team	Pld	W	D	L	GF	GA	GD	Pts	Final result
1	(Florida) Naples United FC	3	2	1	0	11	3	+8	**7**	Advance to Region III Final
2	(Texas) ASC New Stars	3	1	2	0	6	3	+3	**5**	
3	(South Carolina) Majestic FC	3	1	1	1	6	6	0	**4**	
4	(Georgia (U.S. state)) Cobb United FC	3	0	0	3	3	14	−11	**0**	

Source: Match reports
Rules for classification: 1) points; 2) head to head; 3) goal differential [capped at a 3-goals per match]; 4) goals for [capped at 3 goals per match]; 5) penalty shootout

Home \ Away	ASC	COB	MAJ	NAP
ASC New Stars	—		1–1	1–1
Cobb United FC	1–4	—		1–6
Majestic FC		4–1	—	
Naples United FC			4–1	—

Source: Match reports
Legend: Blue = home team win; Yellow = draw; Red = away team win.

Knockout Stage

Final; June 9
**A1**	**Tobacco Road FC**	**5**
B1	Naples United FC	0

June 9 Final	**Tobacco Road FC (North Carolina)**	**5–0**	**(Florida)** Naples United FC	Greer, South Carolina
	Obeid 14', 26'; Kerr 39'; Maloma 71'; Chrichlow 85'	Report		Stadium: MESA Soccer Complex

Bold = winner
* = after extra time, ( ) = penalty shootout score, FF = forfeit

=== Women's ===
In total, five teams across four state associations participated in a round-robin tournament across June 7-9, alongside the men's tournament. This included defending national champions, NTX Image (Texas). The tournament was won by Winger FC, an affiliate of the WPSL's Charlotte Lady Eagles. The other participants in the tournament were Shot Callers (South Carolina), GAWSA (Georgia), and Pathetico Madrid. Tennessee SC was scheduled to attend but did not compete due to unspecified reasons.

Women's Region III Tournament

Pos	Team	Pld	W	D	L	GF	GA	GD	Pts	Final result
1	(North Carolina) Winger FC	4	4	0	0	11	3	+8	**12**	Advance to National Semifinals
2	(North Carolina) Shot Callers	4	3	0	1	7	4	+3	**9**	
3	(Georgia (U.S. state)) GAWSA	4	1	1	2	7	7	0	**4**	
4	(Texas) NXT Image	4	1	1	2	7	8	−1	**4**	
5	(Florida) Pathetico Madrid	4	0	0	4	2	12	−10	**0**	

Rules for classification: 1) points; 2) head to head; 3) goal differential; 4) goals for; 5) penalty shootout

Home \ Away	GAW	NXI	PMD	SCS	WFC
GAWSA	—	4–4			
NXT Image		—	3–0	1–2	
Pathetico Madrid	0–4		—		2–10
Shot Callers			7–0	—	0–3
Winger FC	2–1	6–0			—

Legend: Blue = home team win; Yellow = draw; Red = away team win.

== Region IV ==
=== Men's ===
In total, 10 teams across seven state associations in USASA Region IV and the National Premier Soccer League sent representatives to the tournament. The Mountain Premier League was the most represented league in the region with three teams participating. Colorado was the most represented state in the tournament with four teams taking part.

The semifinal and final took place on the weekend of June 1–2 at Cheyenne Sports Complex in North Las Vegas, Nevada. (Note: The semifinals and final were originally scheduled to take place at Tropical Breeze Park in North Las Vegas, NV. The week of the event, the matches were moved to Sandstone Ridge Park in North Las Vegas, NV for unknown reasons. On the day of the semifinals, June 1, the venue was once again changed to Cheyenne Sports Complex due to improper field conditions at Sandstone Ridge Park. Saturday's semifinal match start times were also moved from the morning to later that evening due to the venue change.)

Bracket

Home teams listed on top of bracket (Note: With the semifinal and final being held at a single location, "home team" isn't factored into the bracket layout. Officially, Temecula FC and J.M. United FC were designated as the home team for their semifinals. FC Arizona was designated as home team for the final.)

Round 1 May 12
**CO**	**Azteca FC**	**FF**
CO	Young Gunz FC	(Note: Young Gunz FC forfeited due to schedule congestion and claimed the regional tournament was poorly planned.)
CO	Peak XI FC	1 (3)
**CO**	**Timbers SC**	**1 (4)**

Quarterfinals; May 18–25
**CO**	**Azteca FC**	**4**
CO	Timbers SC	0
ID	Boise Alpha FC	1
**UT**	**J.M. United FC**	**4**
**CA**	**Temecula FC**	**FF**
CA	Olympic Club	(Note: The Olympic Club forfeited due to schedule congestion, trouble traveling on short notice, and claimed the regional tournament was poorly planned.)
NM	UNM Club Soccer	0
**AZ**	**FC Arizona**	**4**

Semifinals; June 1
**CO**	**Azteca FC**	**5**
UT	J.M. United FC	1
CA	Temecula FC	1
**AZ**	**FC Arizona**	**2**

Final; June 2
CO	Azteca FC	2
**AZ**	**FC Arizona**	**4***

Bold = winner
* = after extra time, ( ) = penalty shootout score, FF = forfeit

June 2 Final	**FC Arizona**	**4–2** (a.e.t.)	**(Colorado)** Azteca FC	North Las Vegas, Nevada
	Afonso 32'; Figueroa 91'; Waters 97'; Aceves 99'	Report	Salgado 88'; Reyes 112'	Stadium: Cheyenne Sports Complex

=== Women's ===
The Region IV women's representative was intended to be decided via a four-team tournament featuring teams from four state associations (California, Nevada, New Mexico, and Utah) in a Las Vegas-hosted single-elimination tournament. However, scheduling issues led to the cancelation of the event and an agreement that Pan World Elite WFC (Utah) would serve as the region's representative in the national finals.

== National Amateur Cup Finals ==
The national finals took from July 25 to 28 in DeKalb, Illinois, hosted by DeKalb County United.

=== Men's ===
Semifinal; July 25
R4	FC Arizona	2
**R2**	**FC Milwaukee Torrent**	**4**
**R1**	**NY Pancyprian-Freedoms**	**5**
R3	Tobacco Road FC	1

Final; July 27
R2	FC Milwaukee Torrent	0
**R1**	**NY Pancyprian-Freedoms**	**6**

Bold = winner
* = after extra time, ( ) = penalty shootout score, FF = forfeit

==== National Semifinals ====
July 25 Semifinal	**New York Pancyprian-Freedoms (New York (state))**	**5–1**	**(North Carolina)** Tobacco Road FC	DeKalb, Illinois
17:30 CST (UTC-06:00)	Rosero 37', 61'; Thristino 45+2', 80'; Bailon 75'	Report	Flowers 90+3'	Stadium: NIU Soccer and Track & Field Complex

July 25 Semifinal	FC Arizona **(Arizona)**	**2–4**	**(Wisconsin) FC Milwaukee Torrent**	DeKalb, Illinois
20:00 CST (UTC-06:00)	Benjamin 63', 80'	Report	Le Conte 45+1', 85'; Voung 82'; Ludwig 87'	Stadium: NIU Soccer and Track & Field Complex

==== National Amateur Cup Final ====
July 27 Final	**New York Pancyprian-Freedoms (New York (state))**	**6–0**	**(Wisconsin)** FC Milwaukee Torrent	DeKalb, Illinois
19:00 CST (UTC-06:00)	Rosero 7', 43'; Restrepo 9', 14'; Holland 24'; Bustaenti 50'	Report		Stadium: NIU Soccer and Track & Field Complex

=== Women's ===
Semifinal; July 26
**R4**	**Pan World Elite WFC (Note: Pan World Elite WFC is affiliated with the Utah Red Devils of the WPSL)**	**4**
R2	Edgewater Castle FC	0
R1	Rochester Lazers	1
**R3**	**Winger FC (Note: Winger FC is affiliated with the Charlotte Lady Eagles of the WPSL)**	**3**

Final; July 28
**Pan World Elite WFC**	**3**
Winger FC	0

Bold = winner

* = after extra time, ( ) = penalty shootout score, FF = forfeit

==== National Semifinals ====
July 26 Semifinal	Rochester Lazers **(New York (state))**	**1–3**	**(North Carolina) Winger FC**	DeKalb, Illinois
17:30 CST (UTC-06:00)	M. Rutland 46'	Report	Cheron 56'; Lewis 67'; Prathapa 83'	Stadium: NIU Soccer and Track & Field Complex

July 26 Semifinal	**Pan World Elite WFC (Utah)**	**4–0**	**(Illinois)** Edgewater Castle FC	DeKalb, Illinois
20:00 CST (UTC-06:00)	Kimball 7', 11', 58'; Bell Lawrence 13'	Report		Stadium: NIU Soccer and Track & Field Complex

==== National Amateur Cup Final ====
July 28 Final	Winger FC **(North Carolina)**	**0–3**	**(Utah) Pan World Elite WFC**	DeKalb, Illinois
12:00 CST (UTC-06:00)		Report	Evans 7', 69'; Kimball 74'	Stadium: NIU Soccer and Track & Field Complex
