= 2021 Midwest Premier League season =

First season of NISA Nation

Midwest Premier League
- Dates: April 17 - August 1
- Champions: Milwaukee Bavarian SC (Western Conference); Detroit City U23 (Eastern Conference)
- Matches: 122
- Goals: 450 (3.69 per match)
- Top goalscorer: Jordan Walker (FC Diablos) (15 goals)
- Biggest home win: Milwaukee Bavarian SC 8-0 Union Dubuque (May 12)
- Biggest away win: LK St.Clair 0-8 Lansing Common (Jul 11)
- Highest scoring: LK St.Clair 2-7 Detroit City U23 (Jul 14)

The 2021 Midwest Premier League season has been the first season of the Midwest Premier League.

The season have seen 20 founder teams divided in two divisions and the two toppers of each division have been crowned champions. Milwaukee Bavarian SC have won the West Division and Detroit City U23 topped the East Division.

== Teams ==
=== Location map ===
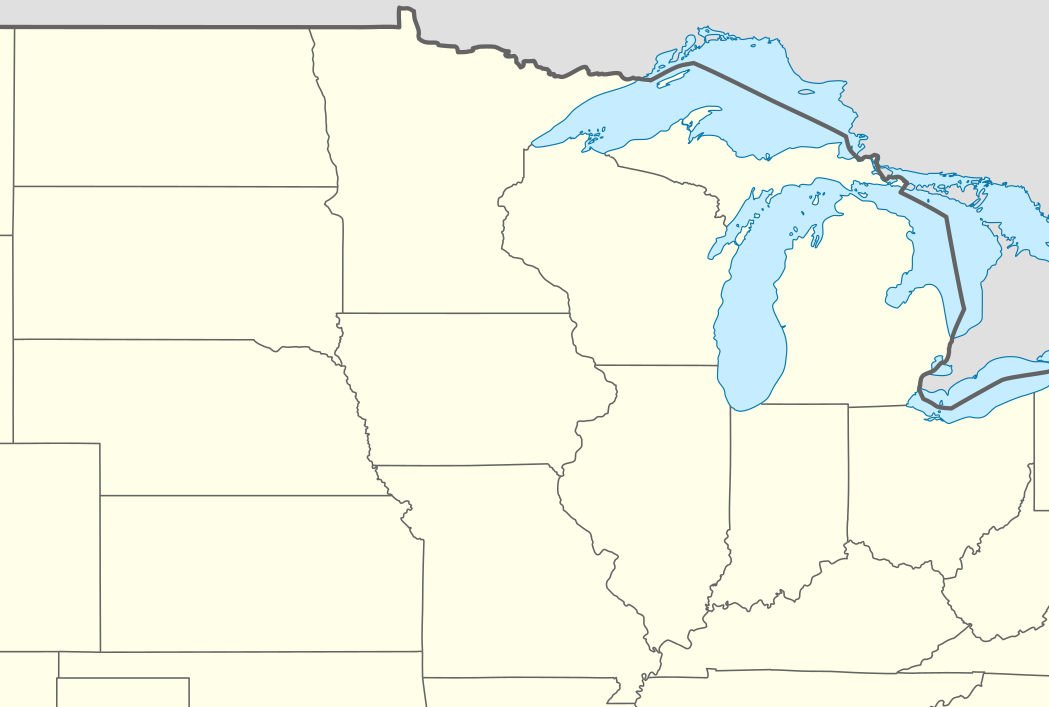
Current team locations:
- West Division
- East Division

Team	City	Stadium	Founded
West Division
Berber City FC	Chicago, IL	Lions for Hope Sports Complex	2013
Cedar Rapids Inferno	Fairfax, IA	Fairfax Sports & Park Complex	2019
Chicago Athletic FC	Bensenville, IL	Redmond Recreational Complex	
Chicago Mustangs	Crystal Lake, IL	MAC Athletic Complex	2012
DeKalb County United	DeKalb, IL	NIU Soccer and Track & Field Complex	2017
FC Diablos	Bloomington, IL	Tucci Stadium	2019
Edgewater Castle FC	Chicago, IL	CIBC Fire Pitch	2017
Milwaukee Bavarian SC	Glendale, WI	Heartland Value Fund Stadium	1929
RWB Adria	Chicago, IL	Hales Franciscan High School	1959
Rockford FC	Rockford, IL	Auburn High School	2019
Steel City FC	Joliet, IL	DuPage Medical Group Field	2020
Union Dubuque FC	Dubuque, IA	Dubuque Soccer Complex	2017

Team	City	Stadium	Founded
East Division
BiH Grand Rapids	Grand Rapids, MI	Midwest United Complex	2018
Detroit City FC U23	Hamtramck, MI	Keyworth Stadium	2020
Inter Detroit	Auburn Hills, MI	Evolution Sportsplex	2017
Lansing Common FC	Lansing, MI	Eastern High School Stadium	2020
Livonia City FC	Livonia, MI	Schoolcraft College	2015
LK St. Clair	Mount Clemens, MI	Mount Clemens High School	2017
Michigan Stars U23	Washington Township, MI	Michigan Stars Sports Center	1982
West Michigan Bearings	Byron Center, MI	South Christian High School	2020

== Standings ==
=== East Division ===
Pos	Team	Pld	W	D	L	GF	GA	GD	Pts
1	Detroit City U23 (C)	14	13	0	1	40	11	+29	39
2	Lansing Common FC	14	10	1	3	35	14	+21	31
3	West Michigan Bearing	14	8	3	3	33	18	+15	27
4	BiH Grand Rapids	14	6	2	6	27	20	+7	20
5	Michigan Stars U23	14	5	4	5	24	23	+1	19
6	Livonia City FC	14	2	3	9	12	30	−18	9
7	Inter Detroit	14	1	5	8	14	32	−18	8
8	LK St. Clair	14	1	2	11	13	50	−37	5

Source: http://midwestpl.com/2021-standings/
Rules for classification: 1) points; 2) goal differential; 3) goals for
(C) Champions

=== West Division ===
Pos	Team	Pld	W	D	L	GF	GA	GD	Pts
1	Milwaukee Bavarian SC (C)	11	9	1	1	35	11	+24	28
2	RWB Adria	11	9	1	1	32	11	+21	28
3	Steel City FC	11	6	3	2	27	20	+7	21
4	Berber City FC	11	6	2	3	27	23	+4	20
5	Cedar Rapids Inferno	11	5	1	5	16	18	−2	16
6	Union Dubuque FC	11	4	3	4	18	26	−8	15
7	FC Diablos	11	4	2	5	27	25	+2	14
8	Chicago Mustangs	11	3	4	4	19	18	+1	13
9	Edgewater Castle FC	11	3	3	5	16	22	−6	12
10	Rockford FC	11	3	0	8	12	21	−9	9
11	DeKalb County United	11	2	1	8	16	31	−15	7
12	Chicago Athletic FC	11	1	1	9	7	26	−19	4

Source: http://midwestpl.com/2021-standings/
Rules for classification: 1) points; 2) goal differential; 3) goals for
(C) Champions

== See also ==
- NISA Nation
- National Independent Soccer Association
- Midwest Premier League
- 2021 NISA Nation season
