= Banta Bowl =

Stadium in Appleton, Wisconsin, U.S.

- Interactive map of Banta Bowl
- Full name: Ron Roberts Field at the Banta Bowl
- Former names: Lawrence Bowl (1965–1978)
- Location: Appleton, Wisconsin
- Coordinates: 44.257844°N 88.385171°W
- Owner: Lawrence University
- Operator: Lawrence University
- Capacity: 3,634
- Surface: FieldTurf

Construction
- Opened: October 2, 1965
- Renovated: 2015
- Reopened: October 17, 2015
- General contractor: Bray Architects (renovation)

Tenants
- Lawrence University football (1965–present); Lawrence University men's soccer (2015–present); Lawrence University women's soccer (2015–present); Green Bay Glory women (WPSL) (2023–present); Green Bay Glory men (MWPL) (2024–present)

Banta Bowl is a stadium located on the campus of the Lawrence University in Appleton, Wisconsin. Opened in 1965, the stadium is built into a ravine along the Fox River and has been the home to Lawrence Vikings football since its opening and Lawrence men's and women's soccer following a renovation in 2015. The stadium also hosts the men's and women's sides of semi-professional soccer club Green Bay Glory.

== History ==
The stadium was built in 1965 as the Lawrence Bowl and was funded by an anonymous donation, later revealed to be from Lawrence alumnus George Banta Jr., the president of the Banta Corporation and son of its founder, George Banta. The Vikings defeated St. Olaf College in their first game at the stadium, 26-21, on October 2, 1965. In Lawrence's second season at the stadium, they went undefeated and won their first Midwest Conference championship since 1951. After Banta Jr. died in 1978, the stadium was renamed to Banta Bowl in his honor.

In 2015, the stadium underwent a major $4.5 million renovation in conjunction with its 50th anniversary. The project replaced the existing natural grass with a widened and raised FieldTurf surface to accommodate the Lawrence men's and women's soccer teams as new tenants. It also replaced the bleachers, scoreboard, locker rooms, concessions, and parking lot. Alongside the renovation, the field was named Ron Roberts Field, dedicated to Ron Roberts, who coached Lawrence from its first season at the stadium until 1983 and again in 1992. The first event at the stadium post-renovation was a high school football game on August 21, 2015, between Hortonville and Appleton West, the latter of whom used the stadium temporarily during renovations to their field. A formal reopening and dedication ceremony was held on October 17, 2015.

On February 7, 2024, semi-professional women's soccer club Green Bay Glory announced the creation of a men's team that would begin play at the Banta Bowl as members of the Midwest Premier League.

On August 6, 2026, Lawrence donated the use of the Banta Bowl to the Menasha High School football team for the season after their home Nathan Calder Stadium was severely damaged by an EF3 July 27 tornado that also affected Appleton.

== Events ==
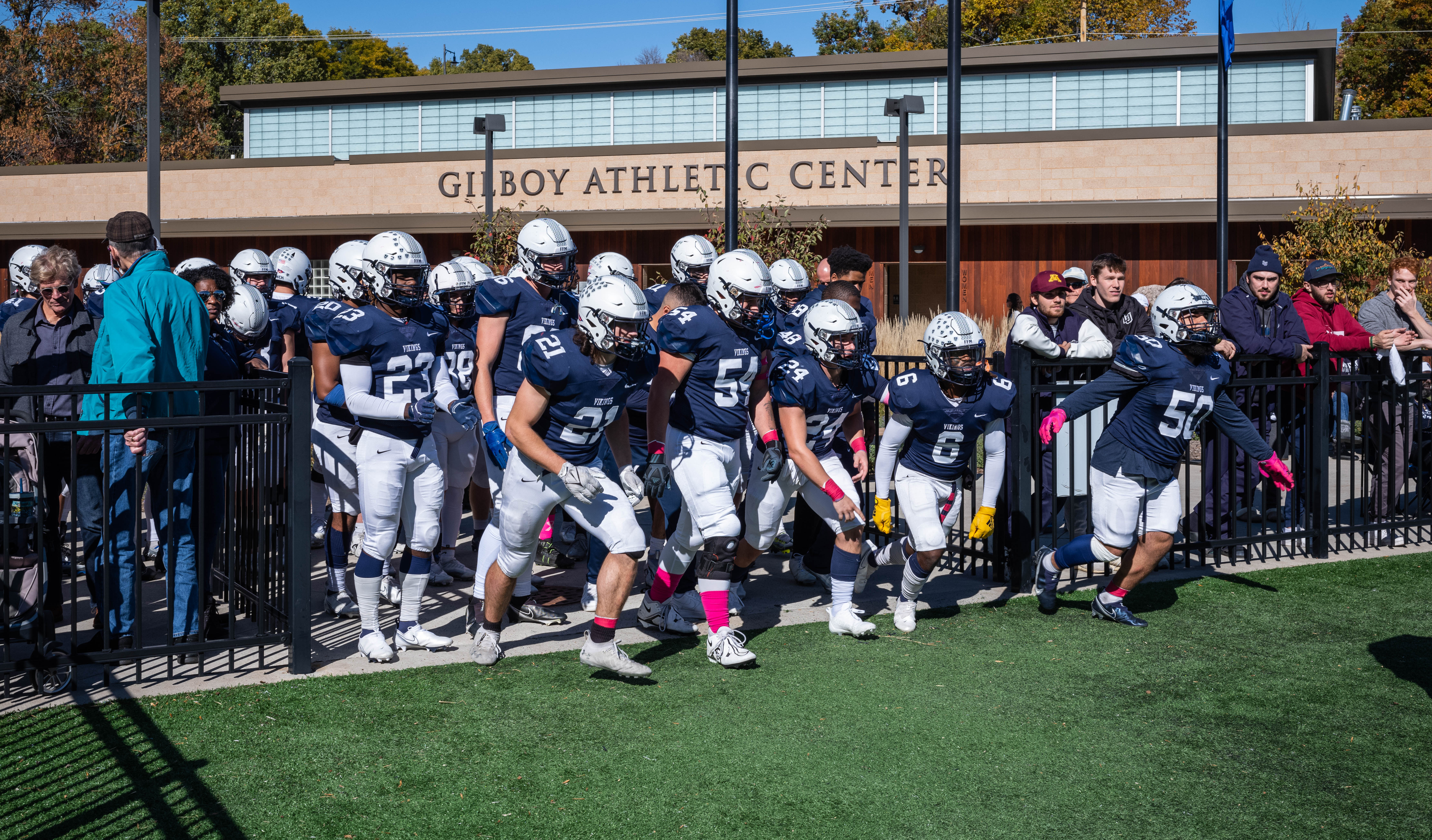
Lawrence football exiting the locker room in 2022

The first event at the stadium was a Lawrence football game, on October 2, 1965, where they defeated St. Olaf 26-21.

Lawrence's women's soccer team held their first match at the Banta Bowl on September 1, 2015, a 3-1 loss to Marian University. Their men's soccer team debuted at the stadium four days later with a 2-0 loss to Aurora University.

On July 8, 2025, the Banta Bowl hosted the finals of the 2025 National Amateur Cup Region II women's tournament, where the Glory defeated FC Milwaukee Torrent 3-2 to qualify for the national finals.
