= 2025 National Amateur Cup =

101st edition of cup competition in American soccer

2025 USASA National Amateur Cup
Tournament details
- Country: United States
- Teams: 56 (men); 10 (women)

Final positions
- Champions: West Chester United SC (men); Pan World Elite (women)
- Runners-up: RWB Adria (men); Capital Pride (women)

Tournament statistics
- Matches played: 73
- Goals scored: 348 (4.77 per match)
- All statistics correct as of May 30, 2025.

The 2025 National Amateur Cup is the 101st edition of the National Amateur Cup, a knockout cup competition open to amateur teams affiliated with the United States Adult Soccer Association (USASA). It was the seventh edition of the tournament to award its men's champion a spot in the U.S. Open Cup.

New York Pancyprian-Freedoms (NY) and Pan World Elite WFC (UT) are the defending Men's and Women's National Amateur Cup champions, respectively. However, New York Pancyprian-Freedoms failed to defend their Region I title, losing in the final.

West Chester United SC (PA) won the men's title, while Pan World Elite WFC (UT) successfully defended their women's title.

== Format ==
Each of the USASA's four regions hold qualifying tournaments to determine a regional champion. The format of the qualifying tournament is left to the discretion of each region with the minimum requirement of either a group of four teams each playing three games or an eight-game elimination tournament. A single-elimination tournament is the most common format used. The four regional champions then compete in a single-elimination tournament at a neutral location to determine the national champion.

== Region I ==
=== Region I men's tournament ===
In total, 16 teams across seven state associations in USASA Region I and the National Premier Soccer League sent representatives to the tournament for the Fitz Marth Amateur Cup. The Eastern Premier Soccer League was the most represented league in the region with six teams participating. Pennsylvania was the most represented state in the tournament with three teams taking part.

The final of the regional tournament will take place on June 14 at the Ukrainian American Sports Center in North Wales, Pennsylvania.

Bracket

Home teams listed on top of bracket

First Round; April 6	Quarterfinals; April 27
NJ	Ironbound SC	2
**MA**	**Atletico Boston**	**3***
MA	Atletico Boston	1
**NY**	**NY Pancyprian-Freedoms**	**4**
CT	Hermandad Connecticut	0
**NY**	**NY Pancyprian-Freedoms**	**6**
**North**
**MA**	**Loco Gunners**	**3**
CT	KO Elites FC	1
MA	Loco Gunners	1
**NY**	**Lansdowne Yonkers FC**	**3**
**NY**	**Lansdowne Yonkers FC**	**4**
NJ	SC Vistula Garfield	0
MD	Das Bierhalle FC	0
**PA**	**West Chester United SC (USLPA)**	**7**
**PA**	**West Chester United SC (USLPA)**	**11**
VA	Alexandria Reds	0
**VA**	**Alexandria Reds**	**3**
D.C.	Yinz United	1
**South**
PA	Colonial SC	1
**MD**	**Christos FC**	**2**
**MD**	**Christos FC**	**2**
VA	Club Atlético Los Toros	1
**VA**	**Club Atlético Los Toros**	**3**
PA	West Chester United SC (NPSL)	0

Semifinals; May 18
**NY**	**NY Pancyprian-Freedoms**	**3**
NY	Lansdowne Yonkers FC	2
**PA**	**West Chester United SC (USLPA)**	**FF**
MD	Christos FC	(Note: Original match saw Christos FC beat West Chester United SC, 3–2 after extra time, on Sunday May 18. West Chester filed a protest alleging Christos used a player that was not listed on the team's submitted roster. A panel from the USASA National Cup committee reviewed and upheld the protest on Wednesday, May 28, disqualifying Christos and advancing West Chester.)

Final; June 14
NY	NY Pancyprian-Freedoms	0
**PA**	**West Chester United SC (USLPA)**	**3**

Bold = winner
* = after extra time, ( ) = penalty shootout score, FF = forfeit

=== Region I women's tournament ===
Pos	Team	Pld	W	D	L	GF	GA	GD	Pts	Qualification
1	Rochester Lazers (NY)	1	1	0	0	2	0	+2	**3**	Playoffs
2	Garden City FC (MA)	2	1	0	1	3	2	+1	**3**	
3	Sidekicks FC (MA)	1	0	0	1	0	3	−3	**0**	

Updated to match(es) played on June 21, 2025. Source: https://www.theleaguefc.com/news/west-region-schedule-announcement

==== Results ====
Home \ Away	GAR	ROC	SID
Garden City FC (MA)	—		0–3
Rochester Lazers (NY)	2–0	—	
Sidekicks FC (MA)		NP	—

Updated to match(es) played on June 21, 2025. Source: https://www.theleaguefc.com/news/west-region-schedule-announcement
Legend: Blue = home team win; Yellow = draw; Red = away team win.

===== Finals =====
**Finals**; **June 22**
3	Sidekicks FC (MA)	0
**1**	**Rochester Lazers (NY)**	**3**

== Region II ==
=== Region II men's tournament ===
In total, 26 teams across eight state associations in USASA Region II and the National Premier Soccer League sent representatives to the tournament for the Bill Davey Amateur Cup. The Midwest Premier League was the most represented league in the region with 11 teams participating. Illinois was the most represented state in the tournament with nine teams taking part.

Registration for the tournament was open until March 17. Teams from the region's 14 state associations and National Premier Soccer League were eligible to enter.

The final of the regional tournament will take place between Thursday, June 19 and Wednesday July 3.

Note: Separate draws were held for rounds 1, 2, and the Quarterfinals.

Bracket Home teams listed on top of bracket

Round 1 April 24 – May 10
MN	Minnesota Blizzard FC	1
**MN**	**Vlora FC**	**5**
**WI**	**United Serbian Soccer Club**	**4**
WI	Green Bay Glory	1
KY	Bootleggers AC	2
**OH**	**Valhalla FC**	**3**
OH	Cincy SC	0
**KY**	**Northern Kentucky Nitro FC**	**5**
MI	Imlay City FC	1
**MI**	**Michigan Stars U23**	**7**
**MI**	**Livonia City FC**	**4***
IN	1927 SC	2
**IL**	**Chicago House AC**	**FF**
IL	Billings FC
IL	Steel City FC	1
**IL**	**KS Wisloka Chicago**	**3**
IN	Goshen City SC	1(4)
**MI**	**Michigan Rangers FC**	**1(5)**
**IL**	**Edgewater Castle FC**	**5**
IL	SAC Wisla Chicago	0
IA	Pearl City Soccer Club	2(4)
**IL**	**Rockford FC**	**2(5)**
IL	United SC	0
**IL**	**RWB Adria**	**2**

Round 2 May 18 – 28
**MN**	**Vlora FC**	**6***
WI	United Serbian Soccer Club	2
**OH**	**Valhalla FC**	**3**
KY	Northern Kentucky Nitro FC	1
**MI**	**Michigan Stars U23**	**1**
MI	Livonia City FC	0
**IL**	**Chicago House AC**	**3**
IL	KS Wisloka Chicago	2
**MI**	**Michigan Rangers FC**	**2**
IL	Edgewater Castle FC	0
IL	Rockford FC	0
**IL**	**RWB Adria**	**2***

Quarterfinals; May 22 – June 4
MN	Vlora FC	3
**WI**	**FC Milwaukee Torrent**	**5**
OH	Valhalla FC	1
**MI**	**Michigan Stars U23**	**5**
IL	Chicago House AC	0
**MI**	**Michigan Rangers FC**	**3**
**IL**	**RWB Adria**	**4**
WI	Bavarian United SC	1

Semifinals; June 5 – 18
**IL**	**RWB Adria**	**4**
WI	FC Milwaukee Torrent	0
**MI**	**Michigan Rangers FC**	**3**
MI	Michigan Stars U23	1

Regional Final; June 19 – July 3
**IL**	**RWB Adria**	**6**
MI	Michigan Rangers FC	2

Bold = winner
* = after extra time, ( ) = penalty shootout score, FF = forfeit

=== Region II women's tournament ===
Registration for the 2025 women's Region II Amateur Cup is open until March 17. Teams from the region's 14 state associations, Women's Premier Soccer League, United Women's Soccer, and US Club Soccer are eligible. Games are scheduled to begin in mid-May.

**Semi-Finals**; June 16–17
IL	DeKalb County United	0
**WI**	**Green Bay Glory**	**3**
IL	Edgewater Castle FC	3
**WI**	**FC Milwaukee Torrent**	**4**

**Finals**; July 8
**WI**	**Green Bay Glory**	**3**
WI	FC Milwaukee Torrent	2

== Region III ==
In total, six teams across three state associations in USASA Region III sent representatives to the tournament. North Carolina was the most represented state in the tournament with three teams taking part.

Region III held its tournament over one weekend on June 13–15 at Bryan Park Soccer Complex in Browns Summit, North Carolina. Separated into two groups of three teams, each team played three games against opponents from the opposite group. The two teams with the highest point total after three games, regardless of group, advanced to the regional final.

Group A

Pos	Team	Pld	W	D	L	GF	GA	GD	Pts	Qualification
1	(North Carolina) Say Word FC (C)	3	2	1	0	12	2	+10	7	Playoffs
2	(North Carolina) Tobacco Road FC	3	2	0	1	16	4	+12	6	
3	(North Carolina) Tar Devils SC	3	2	0	1	6	7	−1	6	

Source: Match reports
(C) Champions

Group B

Pos	Team	Pld	W	D	L	GF	GA	GD	Pts	Qualification
1	(Texas) ASC New Stars (Q)	3	2	1	0	8	3	+5	7	Playoffs
2	(Georgia (U.S. state)) Brute Force FC	3	0	0	3	3	15	−12	0	
3	(Georgia (U.S. state)) Peachtree SC	3	0	0	3	1	16	−15	0	

Source: Match Reports
(Q) Qualified for the phase indicated

Home \ Away	ASC	BFF	PEA	SAY	TOB	TAR
ASC New Stars	—			2–2		
Brute Force FC		—				2–3
Peachtree SC			—		1–6	
Say Word FC		3–0* (Note: Say Word FC awarded win due to Brute Force FC lack of players)	7–0	—		
Tobacco Road FC	1–2	9–1			—	
Tar Devils SC	0–4		3–0			—

Source: Match reports
Legend: Blue = home team win; Yellow = draw; Red = away team win.

Notes

Knockout Stage

Final; June 15
NC	Say Word FC	1
TX	ASC New Stars	0

== Region IV ==
In total, eight teams across five state associations in USASA Region III sent representatives to the tournament. The Greater Salt Lake Soccer League was the most represented league in the region with three teams participating. Utah was the most represented state in the tournament with three teams taking part.

Region IV held its tournament over one weekend on June 20–22 at the Regional Athletic Complex in the Westpointe neighborhood of Salt Lake City, Utah. Separated into two groups of four teams, each team played one games against opponents from their group. The two teams with the highest point total after three games in each group advanced to the regional final.

The points for group standings were as follows: 6 points for a win, 3 points for a tie, 1 point for a shutout, 0 points for a loss, 1 point for each goal scored up to three goals.

Group A

Pos	Team	Pld	W	D	L	GF	GA	GD	Pts	Qualification
1	(Utah) Red Devils FC	3	2	1	0	8	4	+4	24	Playoffs
2	(Nevada) Rebels United FC	3	2	1	0	9	6	+3	23	
3	(Utah) Kita FC	3	1	0	2	12	9	+3	13	
4	(Idaho) Boise Alpha FC	3	0	0	3	4	14	−10	4	

Source: Match reports

Home \ Away	BOI	KIT	REB	RED
Boise Alpha FC	—		2–3	
Kita FC	8–2	—		
Rebels United FC		4–2	—	2–2
Red Devils FC	3–0	3–2		—

Source: Match reports
Legend: Blue = home team win; Yellow = draw; Red = away team win.

Notes

Group B

Pos	Team	Pld	W	D	L	GF	GA	GD	Pts	Qualification
1	(Nevada) Sin City FC	3	3	0	0	14	2	+12	26	Playoffs
2	(Colorado) Peak XI	3	2	0	1	9	10	−1	18	
3	(Utah) Vikings SC	3	1	0	2	4	5	−1	10	
4	(California) Medallo City FC	3	0	0	3	7	17	−10	6	

Source: Match reports

Home \ Away	MED	PEA	SIN	VIK
Medallo City FC	—		1–8	
Peak XI	6–4	—		2–1
Sin City FC		5–1	—	1–0
Vikings SC	3–2			—

Source: Match reports
Legend: Blue = home team win; Yellow = draw; Red = away team win.

Notes

Knockout Stage

Final; June 22
UT	Red Devils FC	3
NV	Sin City FC	4

== National Amateur Cup Finals ==
The National Amateur Cup Finals will be held July 25–26 at Uihlein Soccer Park in Milwaukee, Wisconsin

=== Men's Final ===
**Semifinals**; July 25
R3	Say Word FC	0
**R2**	**RWB Adria**	**1**
R4	Sin City FC	2
**R1**	**West Chester United SC**	**3**

**Final**; July 26
R2	RWB Adria	3
**R1**	**West Chester United SC**	**4***

=== Women's final ===
**Semifinals**; July 25
**R4**	**Pan World Elite**	**5**
R1	Rochester Lazers	1
**R3**	**Capital Pride**	**0 (3)**
R2	Green Bay Glory	0 (1)

**Final**; July 26
**R4**	**Pan World Elite**	**2**
R3	Capital Pride	0

Bold = winner
* = after extra time, ( ) = penalty shootout score, FF = forfeit
