= University Liggett School =

School in Grosse Pointe Woods, Michigan, US

Coordinates: 42°25′35.39″N 82°53′57.53″W

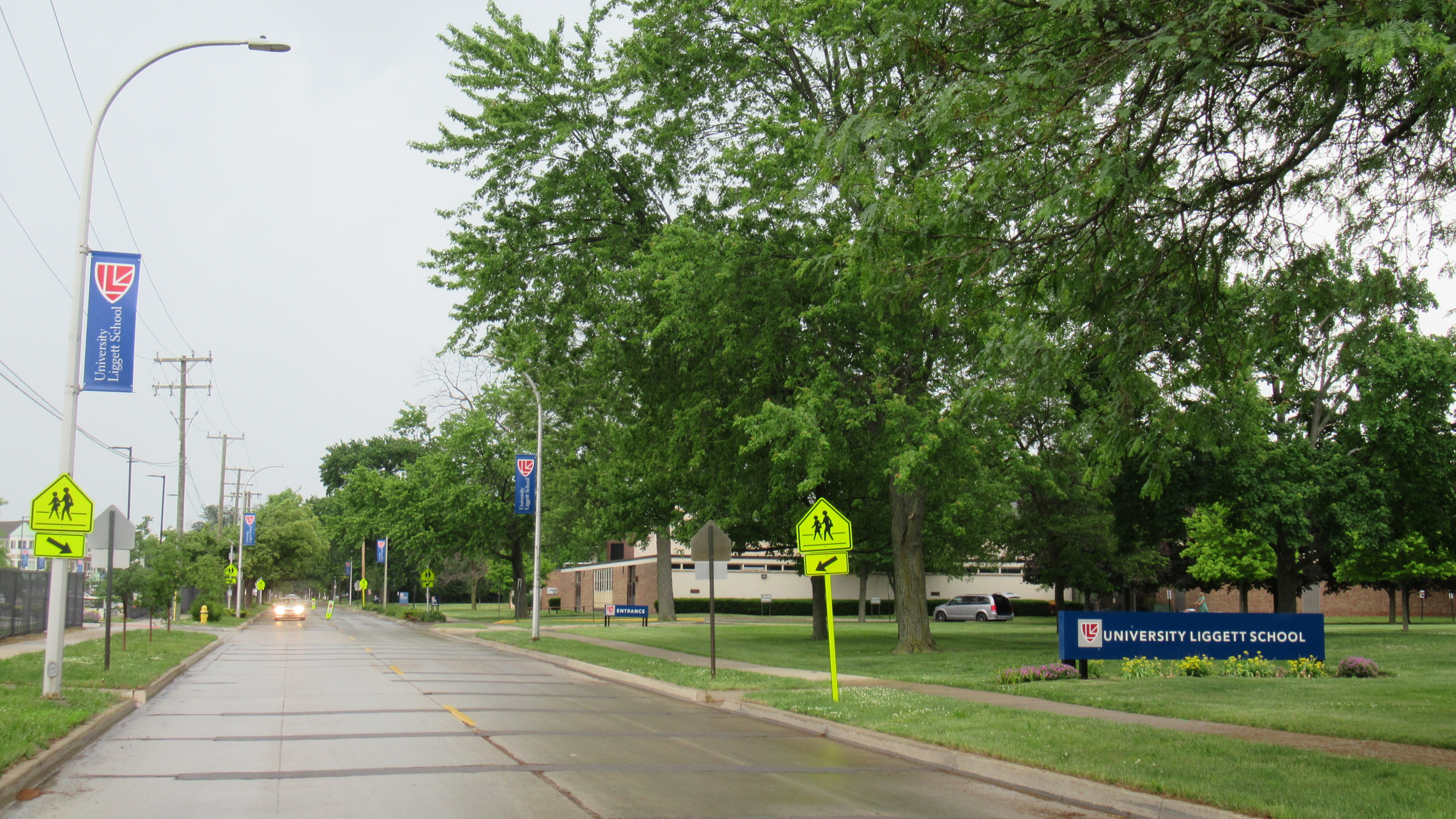
- Campus location along Cook Road
- Grosse Pointe Woods, Michigan; United States

Information
- School type: Private, Co-educational
- Established: 1878, as Liggett School
- Head of school: Paul Rossi
- Enrollment: 612 PreK-12
- Average class size: 14 students
- Campus size: 50 acres (200,000 m^{2}) on two locations
- Campus type: Suburban
- Colors: Red, White and Blue
- Mascot: Knight
- Endowment: $36.5 million
- Website: Official website

University Liggett School, also known as Liggett, is a private, independent, secular school in Grosse Pointe Woods, Michigan, United States.

The school teaches grades PreK3 through twelve on one campus, consolidating its two campuses to one in the fall of 2012. According to the school, over 50 zip codes in Southeastern Michigan are represented by its student population. Over $2 million in merit- and need-based financial aid is awarded to new and returning students annually.

== History ==
=== The Liggett School ===
In the spring of 1878, seven members of the Liggett family, headed by the Reverend James D. Liggett, settled in Detroit to establish a small, independent school for girls originally named The Detroit Home and Day School. In 1883, the school moved to a three-story brick building at the corner of Cass Avenue and Stimson Place. In 1914, the Albert Kahn-designed "Eastern Liggett" branch, on Burns Avenue at Charlevoix, was built and soon fully occupied. It would remain so until 1964, when classes would be held in a new building constructed on Briarcliff Drive in Grosse Pointe Woods. The Burns Avenue building was sold, and now houses the Detroit Waldorf School.

=== Detroit University School ===
Detroit University School, the second of Liggett’s predecessor schools, was founded in 1899 by Charles Bliss and Henry Gray Sherrard, who sought independence from public schools. In 1916, after a fire destroyed Detroit University School's original building at Elmwood between Larned and Congress, it moved to what became known as the "Castle," a Gothic-style former residence on Parkview Drive midway between Jefferson Avenue and the Detroit River. There it remained until 1928, when, with the help of Henry and Edsel Ford and many other Detroiters, the school relocated to Cook Road, then the eastern limits of Grosse Pointe.

=== Grosse Pointe Country Day School ===
Opened in 1915 in a white frame house (still standing at 301 Roosevelt Place in Grosse Pointe), Grosse Pointe Country Day School served boys and girls from kindergarten through ninth grade. A year later, classes opened in an English-style building located at Fisher Road and Grosse Pointe Boulevard. In 1941, Detroit University School and Grosse Pointe Country Day School joined forces under one board. For the day-to-day life of the schools, the major change was that Country Day sent its older boys to Detroit University School and became a school for girls.

=== Grosse Pointe University School ===
In 1954, the Country Day building was sold to the Grosse Pointe public schools, and the girls joined the boys on the Cook Road campus, merging the schools to make Grosse Pointe University School. Minoru Yamasaki was commissioned to design a lower school, a middle school, and other facilities, such as a new gymnasium, an auditorium, a library, and fine arts rooms, to complement the two-story brick building erected in 1928.

In 1969, the need for an increase in space for the middle school was solved by merging Grosse Pointe University School with The Liggett School to form University Liggett School.

== Accreditations, Academics and Arts ==
=== Sports ===
University Liggett School is accredited by the National Association of Independent Schools and Association of Independent Michigan Schools. ULS' sports teams compete with regional private and public high schools, such as Detroit Country Day School, Greenhills School, Oakland Christian, and Cranbrook Kingswood. Liggett competes athletically in the Michigan Independent Athletic Conference for most regular-season contests with many other similarly sized independent schools throughout Michigan. In 2017, the school became a member of the Catholic High School League. It also is a member of the Michigan High School Athletic Association and its 9-12 enrollment of 244 currently places it in MHSAA's Class D.

University Liggett School has had three teams in the last two years compete in or win Michigan High School Athletic Association state championships. The girls basketball team was runner-up in the 2011 and 2012 seasons for Division III. The boys baseball team won the Division IV state title in 2011, was runner-up in the 2012 season, and won the state title again in 2013. The girls softball team was runner-up for the state title in 2013. Also, the boys ice hockey team won the Division III state title in 2012. In 2014, the girls ice hockey team won the Division I state title.

University Liggett School also has a FIRST Robotics Competition team that began its rookie season in 2010. The robotics team won the FIRST Robotics World Championship in 2022.

Midwest Premier League side Liquid Football used the stadium for their home games during the 2023 season.

=== Arts ===
University Liggett Schools students produce films and workshops made throughout the year, and the performing arts department launches two major theatrical productions annually: a drama each fall and a musical each winter. The school is active in the International Thespian Society and the Educational Theatre Association as Troupe 5253. The school's Manoogian Arts Wing was added in 1981, under the planning of then-Arts head Ed Jacomo; it added arts facilities to the school, including a new dance studio, an art display, an audio-video editing studio, five arts classrooms, arts offices, and a conference room. Dr. Phillip Moss, a highly respected director and actor, is currently the chair of the creative and performing arts department of the school. Notable performances have included a 2011-2012 production of Chicago that was sent to national festival where many actors and crew received excellent and superior ratings.

== Notable faculty and alumni ==
- Nolan Allaer (born 2002), racing driver (2020)
- Mira Edgerly-Korzybska (born 1872), American miniature painter
- Jeffrey Eugenides (born 1960), Pulitzer Prize-winning author (1978)
- Edsel Ford II (born 1948), auto executive and philanthropist (GPUS, 1966)
- Max Gail (born 1943), comedian, former teacher
- Edgar Gott (born 1887), first president of the Boeing Company (DUS, 1904)
- Julie Harris (1925-2013), actress, National Medal of Arts honoree (GPCDS, 1944)
- G. Mennen Williams (1911-1987), governor of Michigan
- Aaron Krickstein (born 1967), professional tennis player
- Frank Nelson (1887–1970), Olympic athlete (DUS)
- Miles O'Brien (born 1959), CNN news anchor (1977)
- Walter Olson, legal analyst and blogger
- Gilda Radner (1946-1989), comedian, Saturday Night Live (Class of 1964)
- Keith Richburg, journalist
- Isabel Dodge Sloane (1896-1962), automobile heiress and thoroughbred owner/breeder
- Olivia Thomas, soccer player
- Elizebeth Thomas Werlein (1883 – 1946), conservationist of the French Quarter of New Orleans.
- Andre Rison, current football coach at Liggett, former NFL wide receiver.
- Antonio Cipriano, American actor and singer

== Publications ==
University Liggett School's Office of Marketing and Communications publishes Perspective magazine twice a year. The magazine has been recognized since 2015 with many journalism awards, including five in 2016 from the Society of Professional Journalists Detroit chapter The school's marketing and communications efforts received an international award for Communications Program Improvement in 2015 from the Council for the Advancement and Support of Education.
