= Shady Omar =

Egyptian American soccer player (born 1997)

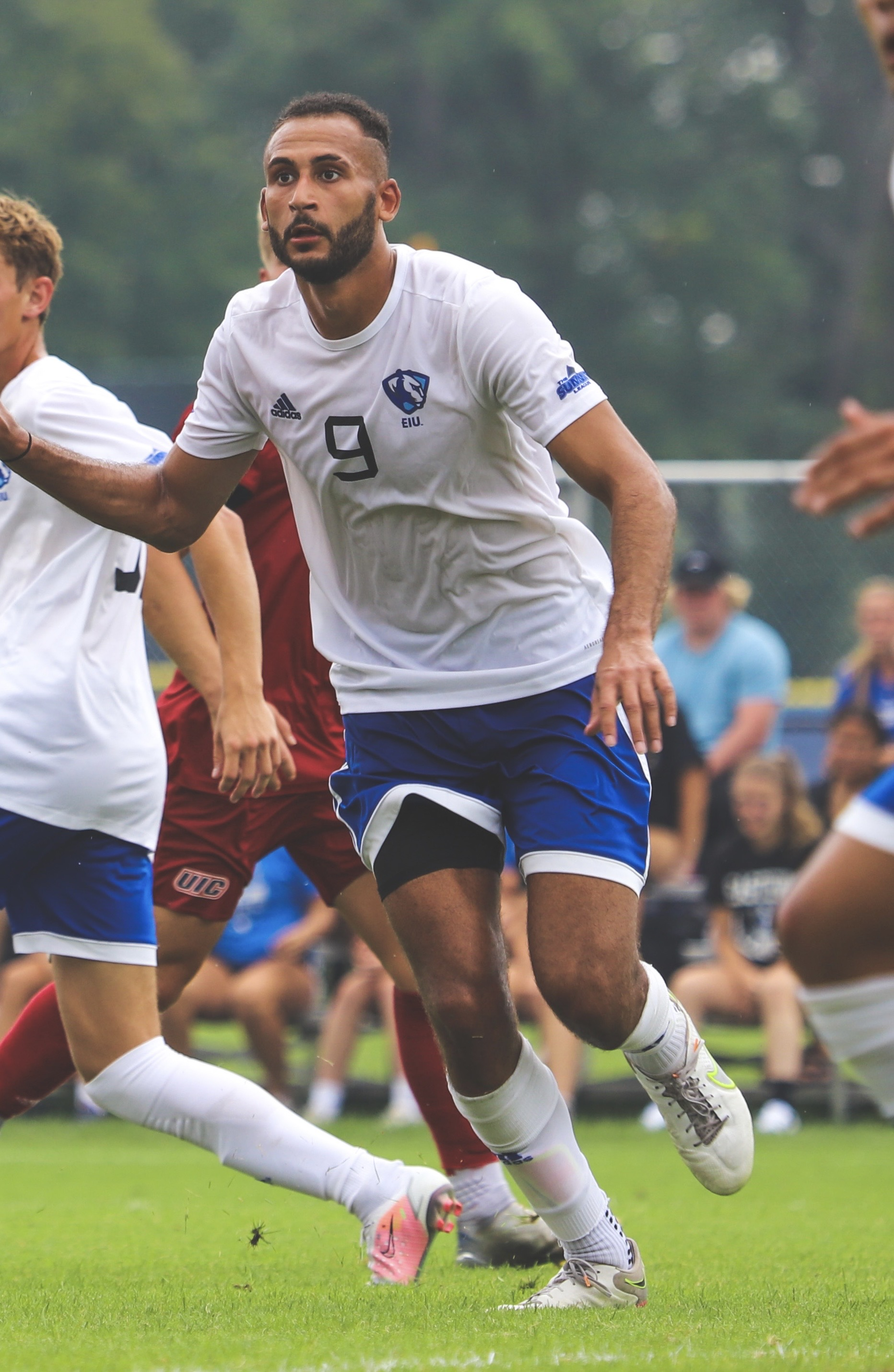

Personal information
- Full name: Shady Said Omar
- Date of birth: June 27, 1997 (age 29)
- Place of birth: East Lansing, Michigan, US
- Height: 6 ft 4 in (1.93 m)
- Position: Forward

Team information
- Current team: El Helal Matruh

Youth career
- Haslett High School
- Michigan Wolves

College career
Years	Team	Apps	(Gls)
2017–2021	Eastern Illinois Panthers	43	(15)

Senior career*
Years	Team	Apps	(Gls)
2015–2016	Ittihad El Shorta	15	(9)
2021	Lansing Common FC	16	(10)
2022	Lansing City	7	(2)
2022	Tala'ea El-Geish	3	(0)
2022	El Helal Matruh	6	(4)
2023	Kalamazoo FC	9	(1)
2023	Inter Detroit	8	(8)
- * Club domestic league appearances and goals

Shady Said Omar (born June 27, 1997) is an Egyptian American professional soccer player who plays as a forward.

== Early life and youth career ==
From East Lansing, Michigan, Omar displayed strong talent in soccer early on, playing for Haslett High School in Michigan, where he scored 80 goals over four years. During his youth career, he also played for the Michigan Wolves.

== College career ==
After high school, Omar attended Eastern Illinois University (EIU) from 2017 to 2021. During his time with the Eastern Illinois Panthers, he emerged as a key player, known for his leadership, resilience, and significant contributions on the field. Shady Omar suffered an injury early in his final season at EIU.

== Professional career ==
=== Ittihad El Shorta (Egypt) ===
Began competing for the Under-21's, was shortly promoted to the senior team, gaining experience in the Egyptian Premier League. Omar had an early professional stint with Ittihad El Shorta in the Egyptian Premier League, where he gained valuable experience in domestic competition.

=== Lansing Common FC ===
After graduating, Omar joined Lansing Common FC in 2021, his goal-scoring abilities and energetic playing style quickly made him a fan favorite. Fans affectionately called him "King Tut" due to his Egyptian heritage, and he became known for his lively celebrations . Shady scored the clubs first hat trick which was a historic moment for soccer in Lansing. He went on to win the leagues Golden Boot award, helping Common to a 2nd-place finish. Midwest Premier League

=== Lansing City ===
Omar played with Lansing City, further extending his experience. His technical skill and forward position continued to make him a valuable asset to the team. Known for his dynamic presence on the field and ability to connect with fans, he played an integral role in the team's strategy. Appeared for Lansing City in 2022 (USL2)

=== Tala'ea El-Geish (Egypt) ===
Participated in preseason and professional matches in the Egyptian Premier League, gaining additional experience in Egyptian soccer. Appeared in a friendly against the Egypt National Under-23 Football Team

=== El Helal Matruh (Egypt) ===
Competed with El Helal Matruh, continuing his career in the Egyptian second division scoring his first goal in an Exhibition match against El-Gouna FC.

=== Kalamazoo FC ===
Appeared for Kalamazoo FC in 2023 (USL2) Played in competitive matches, continuing to showcase his forward skills in the US soccer landscape.
