= George Chomakov =

Bulgarian footballer

George Chomakoviko
Personal information
- Date of birth: 19 November 1990 (age 35)
- Place of birth: Plovdiv, Bulgaria
- Height: 5 ft 9 in (1.75 m)
- Position: Defensive midfielder

Team information
- Current team: Liquid Football

Youth career
- Michigan Wolves

College career
| Years | Team | Apps | (Gls) |
| 2008-2009 | Macomb Monarchs | 14 | (2) |
| 2009-2010 | Schoolcraft Ocelots | 15 | (1) |

Senior career*
| Years | Team | Apps | (Gls) |
| 2012-2013 | Michigan Stars FC | 7 | (0) |
| 2013–2021 | Detroit City FC | 94 | (0) |
| 2023– | Liquid Football | 20 | (1) |
- * Club domestic league appearances and goals

George Chomakav (born 19 November 1990) is a former footballer who played in the NISA for Detroit City FC and co-founder of Liquid Football, an MWPL club in Michigan.

== Early life and playing career ==
Chomakav grew up in Bulgaria and moved to the United States when he was 12 and played for Madison Heights Lamphere High School. After high school, Chomakov received a scholarship to play soccer at Macomb Community College, but was only there for a year before the school dropped the team. Chomakov then played soccer collegiately at Schoolcraft College.

== Senior career ==
After college, Chomakov played for both Michigan Stars and Detroit City FC before retiring in 2021. He now owns a gym apparel brand named Champion Grind.

== Honors ==
National Independent Soccer Association

- Season Championship
  - Champions (2): 2020–21, 2021
- Fall Championship
  - Champions (1): 2020
- Legends Cup
  - Champions (1): 2021
- NISA Independent Cup
  - Great Lakes Region
    - Champions (2): 2020, 2021

National Premier Soccer League

- Midwest Championship
  - Champions (1): 2017
- Great Lakes Conference Regular Season
  - Champions (2): 2013.2019
- NPSL Members Cup
  - Champions (1):2019
