= Liquid Football =

American semiprofessional soccer team in Detroit, Michigan

- Full name: Liquid Football
- Founded: 2022; 4 years ago
- Stadium: Gabriel Richard Catholic High School
- Capacity: 1000
- Owner(s): Javier Bautista, George Chomakov
- Head Coach: Javier Bautista
- League: Midwest Premier League
- 2024: 4th, Great Lakes East Division; Great Lakes Final: DNQ
- Website: https://www.theliquidfootball.com/

Liquid Football is an American soccer club based in Michigan. Founded in 2022, the team competes in the Midwest Premier League. Known for its player-focused approach and fast-paced style of play, the club was founded by Javier Bautista as head coach and co-owner with, George Chomakov, who also serves as captain.

== History ==
The club was founded in 2022, by former Detroit City FC player George Chomakov and former Detroit City FC player and assistant coach Javier Bautista.

On January 17, 2023, the Midwest Premier League officially announced Liquid Football would join the league in 2023.

On June 3rd, 2023, Liquid Football played its first ever non-league friendly game against professional USL League Two side Fort Wayne FC in Indiana, with a final score of 3-0.

== Stadium ==
- University Liggett School (2023)
- Gabriel Richard Catholic High School (2024–present)

== Team image ==
=== Crest ===
The team's crest displays the team colors, beige and cyan. The crest includes a wolf that creates a wave to tie in the liquid part of Liquid Football, a reference to the style of soccer the team aims to play, fluid and smooth in nature. The wolf wears a traditional laurel wreath, as used by the Roman Empire to recognize sporting achievements.

=== Sponsorship ===
Years	Kit manufacturer	Kit sponsor	
Years	Kit manufacturer	Front sponsor	Secondary sponsor
2023	Champion Grind	Luxury Loud	The Balkan House, Very Good Management, I Find Staffing, Alexander Enzo & Co, Pablo's Tacos
2024	Champion Grind	Luxury Loud	The Balkan House, Very Good Management, I Find Staffing, Alexander Enzo & Co
2025	Champion Grind	Luxury Loud	The Balkan House, Very Good Management, I Find Staffing, Alexander Enzo & Co

== Current Squad ==
As of 29 May 2025

Note: Flags indicate national team as defined under FIFA eligibility rules; some limited exceptions apply. Players may hold more than one non-FIFA nationality.

No.	Pos.	Nation	Player
1	GK	USA	Tony Serraiocco
2	DF	USA	Morees Toma
3	DF	USA	Wail Algahim
4	DF	SEN	Abdoul Sene
6	MF	USA	JP Hermosillo
7	FW	USA	Wasseem Muthana
8	MF	USA	Keethan Punniyamoortay
10	FW	CIV	Dehane Gnounrou
11	MF	YEM	Albahri Albahri
12	DF	VEN	Carlos Valbuena

No.	Pos.	Nation	Player
14	MF	USA	Dylan Wismont
15	FW	USA	Aram Shabo
17	DF	CIV	Aladji Kourouma
19	DF	YEM	Sal Alzamzami
21	MF	SYR	George Farah
29	GK	USA	Esmail Haidan
77	MF	SEN	Papi Gueye
80	FW	SEN	Atoumane Dia
99	MF	BUL	George Chomakov (captain)

=== Staff ===
As of 26 May 2025

Position	Staff
Head coach	(United States) Javier Bautista
Assistant coach	(United States) Sonny Lulgjuraj
Assistant coach	(Lebanon) Kareem Srour
Goalkeepers coach	(Saudi Arabia) Mohammad Salman
Strength and Nutrition	(Iraq) Karar Alwashah

== Seasons ==
=== Men ===
As of 26 May 2025

Season	League	Teams	Record	Rank	Division Final	Ref
2023	Midwest Premier League	10	7-1-2	2nd	DNQ	
2024	Midwest Premier League	10	5-3-2	4th	DNQ	

== Notable players ==
The following players have either played at the professional or international level, either before or after playing for the team:

=== Men ===
- (United States) (Bulgaria) George Chomakov- 2023-Present, played professionally at Detroit City FC for three seasons (2019–2021)
- (Hungary) Benedek Tanyi - 2023, played professionally at Detroit City FC for two seasons (2021–2022).
- (Yemen) Albaraa Alsoufi - 2023, played professionally at Gold Star FC for a season (2023).
- (United States) Cyrus Saydee - 2023-2024, played professionally at Detroit City FC for three seasons (2020–2022).
- (Hungary) Barnabas Tanyi - 2023, played professionally at Detroit City FC for three seasons (2021–2023).
