= Steve Provan =

American soccer player

Personal information
- Place of birth: United States
- Height: 5 ft 11 in (1.80 m)
- Positions: Defender; midfielder; forward

College career
Years	Team	Apps	(Gls)
1989–1992	Marquette Golden Eagles		

Senior career*
Years	Team	Apps	(Gls)
1993–1995	Milwaukee Rampage		
1993–1995	Canton Invaders (indoor)	62	(51)
1995–1996	Cincinnati Silverbacks (indoor)	32	(20)
1996	Hampton Roads Mariners		
1996–1997	Milwaukee Wave (indoor)	3	(0)
1998–1999	Wisconsin Rebels		
1999–2000	Milwaukee Rampage	10	(0)
- Milwaukee Bavarians

Managerial career
- 2022–: FC Milwaukee Torrent
- * Club domestic league appearances and goals

Steve Provan is an American soccer coach and former player who is the current head coach of FC Milwaukee Torrent. Provan played professionally in the National Professional Soccer League and USL A-League.

Provan, brother of Josh Provan, graduated from Cudahy High School. He attended Marquette University, playing on the men's soccer team from 1989 to 1992. In 1993, Provan graduated with a bachelor's degree in engineering. That summer, he played for the Milwaukee Rampage which was an independent amateur team at the time. In 1993, the Canton Invaders selected him in the second round of the National Professional Soccer League draft. In addition to playing for the Invaders, Provan also played outdoor soccer with the Milwaukee Rampage in 1994 and 1995. On November 29, 1995, the Invaders traded Provan to the Cincinnati Silverbacks in exchange for Chris Pfau. In the summer of 1996, Provan joined the Hampton Roads Mariners of the USISL Select League, but spent most of the season injured. In July 1996, the Philadelphia KiXX selected Provan in the NPSL expansion draft. On August 26, 1996, the KiXX traded Provan to the Milwaukee Wave in exchange for Don D'Ambra. Injuries limited Provan to three games and he did not play again until 1998 when he joined the Wisconsin Rebels of the USL Premier Development League. In July 1999, the Milwaukee Rampage called Provan up from the Rebels and he finished the season with them. In 2000, he played his last professional season with the Rampage. Provan continued to play high level amateur soccer with the Milwaukee Bavarians.

In 2012, Provan became the head coach of the Sussex Hamilton High School boys' team.

On March 3, 2022, FC Milwaukee Torrent named Provan as head coach for the NPSL squad ahead of the 2022 season.
