= Joliet JackHammers =

Professional baseball team based in Joliet, Illinois

Logo
Cap insignia

Information
- Location: Joliet, Illinois
- Ballpark: Silver Cross Field
- Founded: 2002
- Folded: 2011
- League championships: 0
- Division championships: 1 (2002)
- Former name: Joliet JackHammers (2002–10)
- Former league: Northern League
- Colors: Black, steel blue, construction orange, white, dark orange, gray
- General manager: Jamie Toole
- Manager: Chad Parker
- Media: Joliet Herald News
- Website: www.jackhammerbaseball.com

The Joliet JackHammers were a professional baseball team based in Joliet, Illinois, in the United States. The JackHammers were a member of the Northern League, which is not affiliated with Major League Baseball. From 2002 to 2010, the JackHammers played their home games at Silver Cross Field.

== History ==
Their first season was the 2002 season and the Jackhammers had been preceded in Joliet by the minor league Joliet Convicts, who began play in 1890. The Jackhammers first playoff appearance came in their first season.

The 2008 Jackhammers were managed by one time Arizona Diamondback managerial candidate Wally Backman. The primary radio announcer was Jon Versteeg.

The Jackhammers, in response to extremely low attendance in 2009, had a total makeover to start the 2010 season. Everything, from the roster and management, all the way down to the uniforms, was re-done. Their offseason advertising campaign was also very aggressive, and included everything from newspaper ads to billboards. The Jackhammers made the playoffs for the first time in 8 years, making the season a success performance-wise. They still lagged in attendance, averaging about 3,500 fans a game, 4th in the league.

Founded: 2002
Playoff appearances: 2002, 2010
Divisional titles won: 2002
League Championships won: None

The team was sold in December 2010 after months of negotiations to Steel City Baseball LLC. Steel City bought all assets to the team seeing as they owed $220,000 to the city. With the sale, none of the unpaid bills will be paid off. Steel City changed the team's name for the 2011 season, and the team joined the Frontier League. On January 12, 2011 GM John Dittrich announced for the 2011 season the new team would be called the Joliet Slammers. The team will continue to use Silver Cross Field as their home venue.

== Year-by-year record ==
		First Half		Second Half		Overall
Season	Division	W-L	Finish	W-L	Finish	W-L	Win%	Playoffs
2002	South	22-23	3rd	31-15	1st	53-38	.582	Lost Central semi-final
2003	East	19-25	4th	21-23	4th	40-48	.455	Did not qualify
2004	South	24-24	3rd	25-23	3rd	49-47	.510	Did not qualify
2005	South	23-25	5th	13-35	6th	36-60	.374	Did not qualify
2006	South	16-32	4th	26-23	2nd	42-55	.433	Did not qualify
2007	South	22-26	2nd	23-25	3rd	45-51	.469	Did not qualify
2008	N/A	43-53	5th	N/A	N/A	43-53	.448	Did not qualify
2009	N/A	32-63	6th	N/A	N/A	32-63	.337	Did not qualify
2010	N/A	53-47	3rd	N/A	N/A	53-47	.530	Lost semi-final

== Final roster ==
Joliet JackHammers Roster
Active Roster	Coaching Staff
Pitchers: 34 (United States) Devin Anderson; 17 (United States) Griffin Bailey; 11 (United States) Ronald Bay; 16 (United States) Brian Gartley; 10 (United States) Nathan Ginsberg; 30 (United States) William Jackel; 33 (United States) Billy Petrick ‡; 22 (United States) Todd Privett; 13 (United States) Mike Rocco; 32 (United States) Drew Shetrone; 12 (United States) Rory Shortell; 27 (United States) Ross Stout; 24 (United States) Sean Teague; Catchers: 19 (United States) Joe Billick; 9 (United States) Rafael Mendez; Infielders: 7 (United States) Brad Correll; 3 (United States) Brandon McArthur; 4 (United States) Roberto Mena; 23 (United States) Kevin Rios; 6 (United States) Jorge Rodriguez; 35 (Puerto Rico) Freddie Thon; Outfielders: 14 (United States) Ryan Basham; 21 (United States) Justin Justice; 26 (United States) Jon Nelson; 5 (United States) Jonathon Wyatt	Manager: (United States) Chad Parker; Coaches: (United States) Bryce Florie (Pitching); (United States) Ced Landrum (Hitting); Disabled list; ‡ Inactive list; >§ Suspended list; updated 2010-05-23 [ Transactions]
