= Wauwatosa Curling Club =

Curling club in Wisconsin

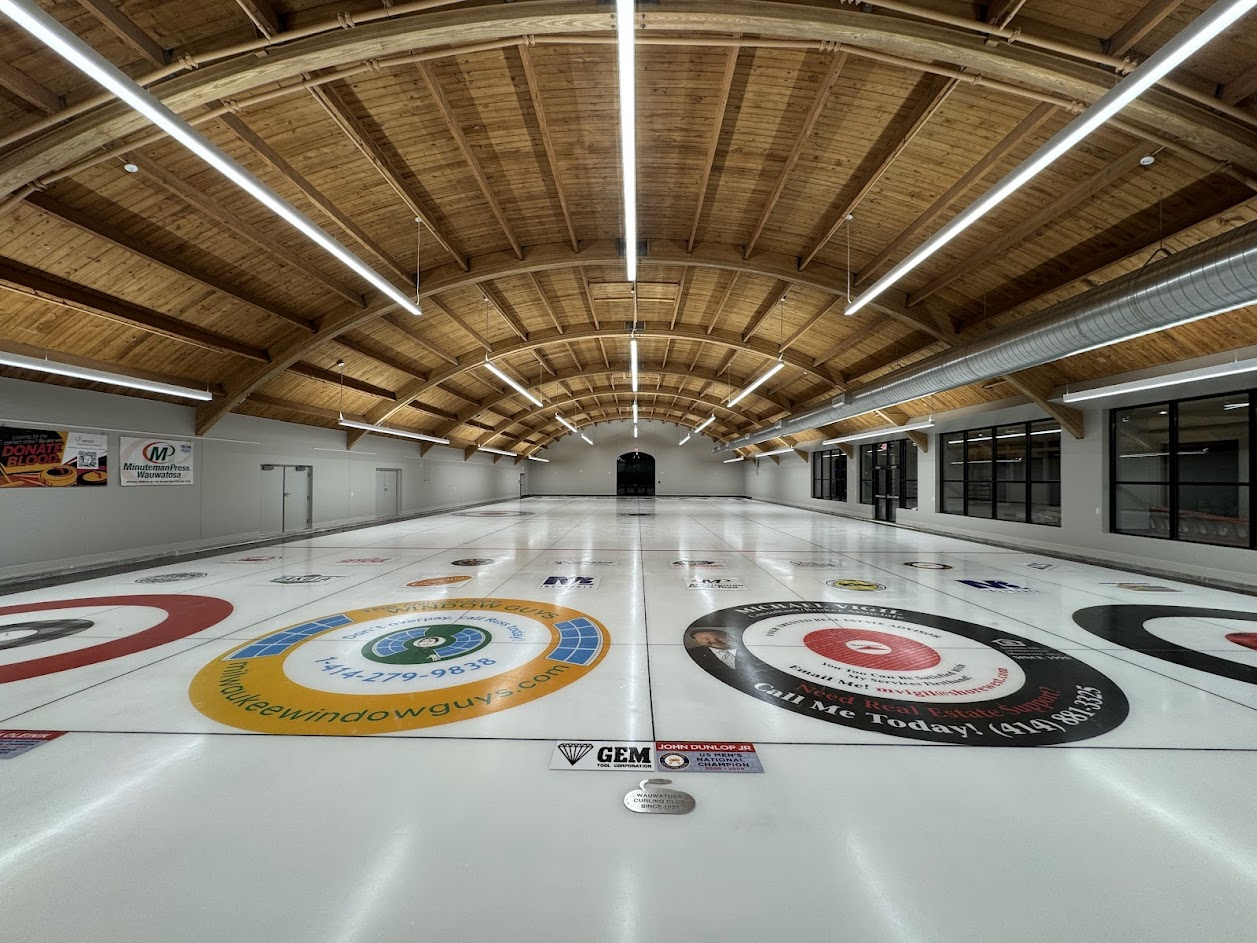
- The Wauwatosa Curling Club's barrel-vaulted laminated pine timber ceiling, Jan 2025
- Location: 7300 West Chestnut Street Wauwatosa, WI 53213

Information
- Established: 1921
- Club type: Curling, Dedicated Ice
- USCA region: Wisconsin State Curling Association
- Sheets of ice: Four
- Rock colors: Red and Yellow
- Website: www.wauwatosacurlingclub.com

The Wauwatosa Curling Club is a curling club in Wauwatosa, Wisconsin and was founded in 1921.

== History ==
In 1920, the club's founding members built a shed and ice surface for two sheets of curling on Wauwatosa's Stickney Field and remained at that location until moving the shed and club operations to Hart Park. The club has been located in Wauwatosa's Hart Park since 1925 and moved into the park's Muellner Building in 1941 to curl on Milwaukee County's first indoor artificial ice.

The Muellner Building in Hart Park and the club's ice rink was constructed in 1940 as part of The New Deal administered by the Works Progress Administration (WPA). The building was granted a historic landmark status in 2012 and renovated in 2024 to restore its historic character from the 1940s.

=== 2024 Renovation and New Rink ===
In 2024, the Muellner Building and club were renovated with architect Kahler Slater, including the reveal and restoration of the icehouse's original barrel-vaulted laminated pine timber ceiling. Funding for the $5 million project came from various sources including the American Rescue Plan Act (ARPA), the City of Wauwatosa, the Wauwatosa Curling Club, and the Wauwatosa Tourism Commission. The facility and club was re-opened in early 2025, and it is getting attention for Wauwatosa as a tourism destination.

=== 2025 Flood ===
On August 9-11, 2025, severe storms produced record and near-record rainfall across the Milwaukee area, causing flash flooding along multiple rivers, including the Menomonee River that runs through Wauwatosa. Unofficial two-day totals exceeded 10 inches in parts of northwestern Milwaukee County, with some reports above 14 inches, prompting statewide and county emergency declarations and widespread water rescues.

Wauwatosa sustained significant impacts. City officials reported that more than 500 homes and 50 businesses were affected, with an initial estimate of approximately $9 million in damage to city-owned public property, much of it at Hart Park where the club is located.

The club’s lower level clubroom in the Muellner Building at Hart Park experienced extensive flooding. News footage and interviews with club leadership described the basement clubroom, including the lounge, kitchen, bar, and locker areas, as being filled to the ceiling with floodwater, rendering most contents a total loss. Power outages complicated initial assessment and cleanup.

The spaces renovated in 2024 on the main and second levels of the Muellner Building, including the club's ice rink, sustained minor damage. Remediation in those areas was initiated immediately after the threat of the storm had passed.

Local and state coverage characterized the event as historic for the region, with infrastructure and cultural organizations across Milwaukee County reporting major flood-related losses.

== Adaptive curling ==
In addition to membership and bonspiel activities, the club holds regular adaptive curling sessions during the season and has played a role in growing the adaptive game with other clubs. Regular adaptive curling participants include veterans groups such as the VA and Milwaukee's Association of the United States Army (AUSA). In more recent years, the club has also offered regular sessions to the Wisconsin Council of the Blind & Visually Impaired (BOLD).

The Team USA Paralympic Wheelchair Curling Team offered a free clinic to adaptive curling participants at the club in 2019.

== Notable members and teams ==
Longtime WCC member Pam Oleinik skipped Team USA to a bronze medal at the 2007 World Senior Curling Championships.

In 2017, longtime WCC Member Greg Dunlop was awarded the second-ever Wisconsin State Curling Association Service Award.

The WCC's junior members team of Michael Elwing, Trevor Marquardt (Poynette Curling Club), Connor Hipke, Ryan Elwing, and Tyler Hipke won the Wisconsin U18 Championship and the U18 National Championship in 2017.

In April 2024, Team Carlson (including club members Ryan Carlson, Joe Matel, Oscar Koebel, Aaron Morrill, and Andy Mentel) won a spot in the USA Curling Club National Championships. Team Carlson earned their national bid by winning the 2024 Wisconsin title.

== Governance and affiliations ==
Wauwatosa is a member of USA Curling, the Wisconsin State Curling Association, the United States Women's Curling Association, and Move United.

The club is run entirely by volunteers, organized as a 501(c)(3) non-profit, and the club's operations are governed by a board of directors.
