= Slammers Stadium =

Minor league baseball stadium in Joliet, Illinois

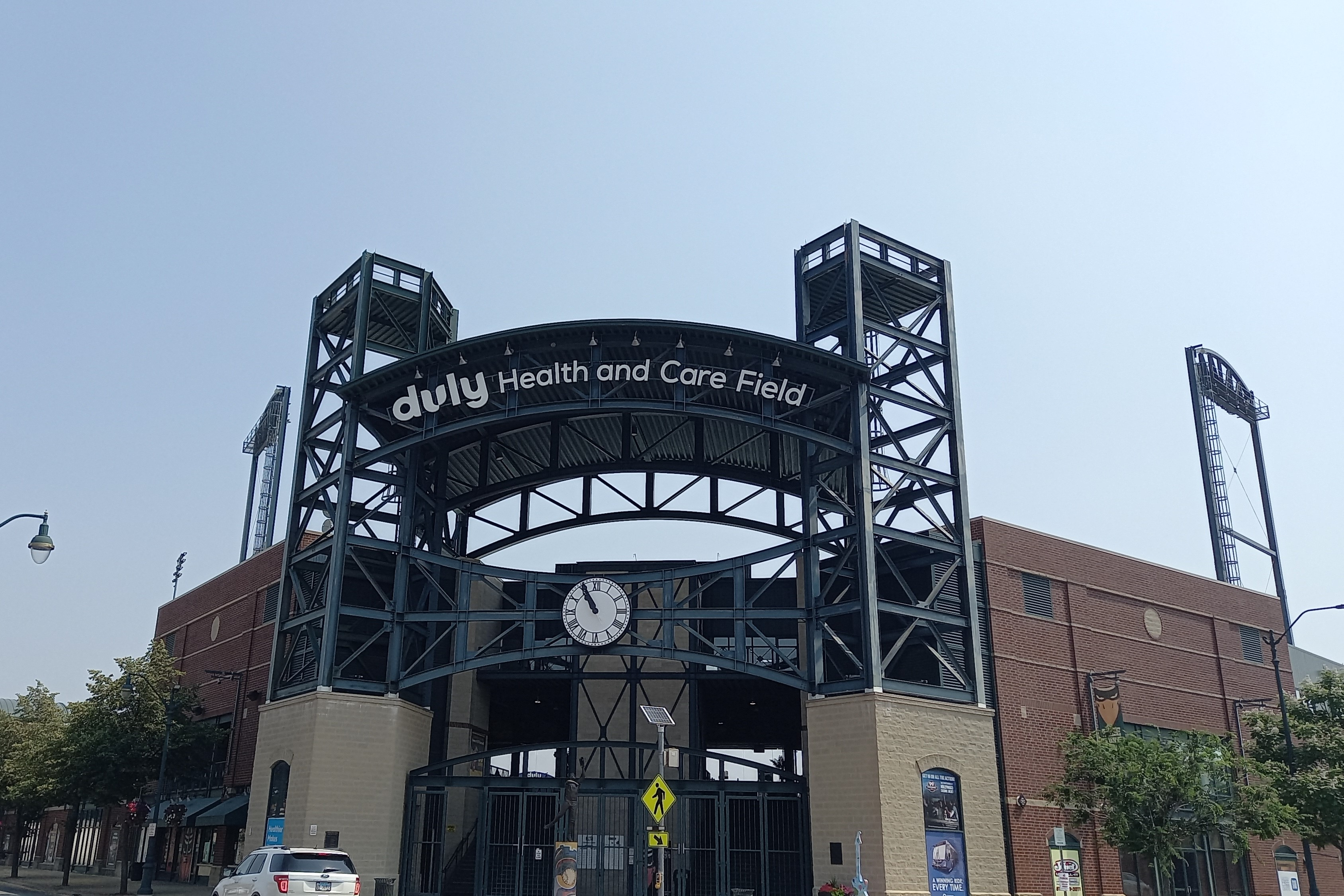
- Ballpark entrance, viewed from street level (June 2023)

- Location within Illinois Location within the United States
- Interactive map of Slammers Stadium
- Former names: Silver Cross Field (2002–2017); Joliet Route 66 Stadium (2017–2019); DuPage Medical Group Field (2019–2022); Duly Health and Care Field (2023–2025)
- Address: One Mayor Art Schultz Drive; Joliet, Illinois
- Coordinates: 41°31′32.56″N 88°4′40.44″W
- Owner: City of Joliet
- Operator: Joliet Slammers
- Capacity: 6,740 (2002–2007); 6,016 (2007–present)
- Surface: Artificial Turf
- Field size: Left field: 348 ft (106 m); Center field: 400 ft (120 m); Right field: 327 ft (100 m)
- Public transit: HCRI at Joliet Gateway Center

Construction
- Groundbreaking: March 7, 2001
- Opened: June 6, 2002
- Renovated: 2018
- Cost: US$27 million
- Architect: Sink Combs Dethlefs

Tenants
- Joliet Jackhammers (NoL) 2002–2010; Joliet Slammers (NAPB) 2011–present Steel City FC (MWPL) 2021–present

Slammers Stadium is a baseball stadium located in Joliet, Illinois. The stadium was built in 2002 and holds 6,016 seats. It is the home of the Joliet Slammers of the National Association of Professional Baseball (NAPB).

== Stadium ==
Slammers Stadium has two levels; the main level and a second level of suites. The main seating area runs from first to third base and there are about 20 rows. There is a general admission lawn area. There are no outfield seats, but there is a large picnic pavilion area beyond the left field wall. There is a concourse that goes completely around the field, but the concourse in right field is behind the fence and one cannot see the field from this area. After installation of artificial turf, the left field fence moved back 18 feet (5.5 m) to a distance of 348 feet (106 m). This was one of the main adjustments made in the facility's US$1.6 million 2018 improvement plan, along with mostly repairs to stadium infrastructure. Since the 2018 renovations, there has only been one soccer tournament held and no lacrosse matches to date. Joliet Slammers Vice President of Marketing and Sales John Wilson has stated that the reason for lack of expanded sporting use is the high demand for baseball to be played on the field.

The ballpark's original name was Silver Cross Field, with the naming rights belonging to Silver Cross Hospital. In November 2017, the City of Joliet announced their plan for rename the facility Joliet Route 66 Stadium, which included a new facade showcasing the area's automotive history centered around U.S. Route 66. In May 2022, the ballpark was renamed to Duly Health and Care Field, reflecting name change of DuPage Medical Group to Duly Health and Care in September 2021.

== Ownership ==
The city of Joliet owns the land and stadium. The city splits the naming rights revenue with the Joliet Slammers.

== Events ==
Slammers Stadium also hosts the University of St. Francis baseball team, as well as local high school baseball games and competitions. It is the site of the annual 3A and 4A IHSA State Final Baseball Tournament that happens every summer. The Joliet Slammers, being the primary tenant, rent out the field to any teams that would like to play in a professional stadium. The facility also hosts several youth baseball leagues in the area as well as certain special events, such as the annual Joliet Police Department vs. Joliet Fire Department rivalry nicknamed "Guns and Hoses".

The facility was slated to play host to a rock concert named the Joliet Slammers Fest on August 10, 2019, but plans fell through when concerns about damaging the newly-installed artificial turf arose. Bands such as Everclear, Bowling for Soup, and Alien Ant Farm, among others, were slated to perform at what was supposed to be the first concert ever held at the stadium. Joliet Slammers management has remained verbally open to the possibility of hosting concert events in the future if proper safety measures can be taken to protect the turf surface. The facility also hosted a wedding in the summer of 2019. Joliet Slammers Director of Tournaments and Special Events Cori Herbert said he estimates that about 425 events were held at DuPage Medical Group Field in 2019 alone. This field also hosts the SWILA leagues championship games, which is an in house league, based in the southwest suburbs of Chicago. The most recent summer champion is the New Lenox Rebels Black. The most recent fall championship is Whiteford 2, based in Joliet.

Events and tenants
Preceded by Haymarket Park	Host of the NoL All-Star Game; Silver Cross Field; 2004	Succeeded by U.S. Steel Yard
Preceded by Canwest Park	Host of the NoL All-Star Game; Silver Cross Field; 2009	Succeeded by Hi Corbett Field
