= Hart Park (Wauwatosa, Wisconsin) =

Park in Wisconsin, United States

Coordinates: 43.04702°N 88.00334°W

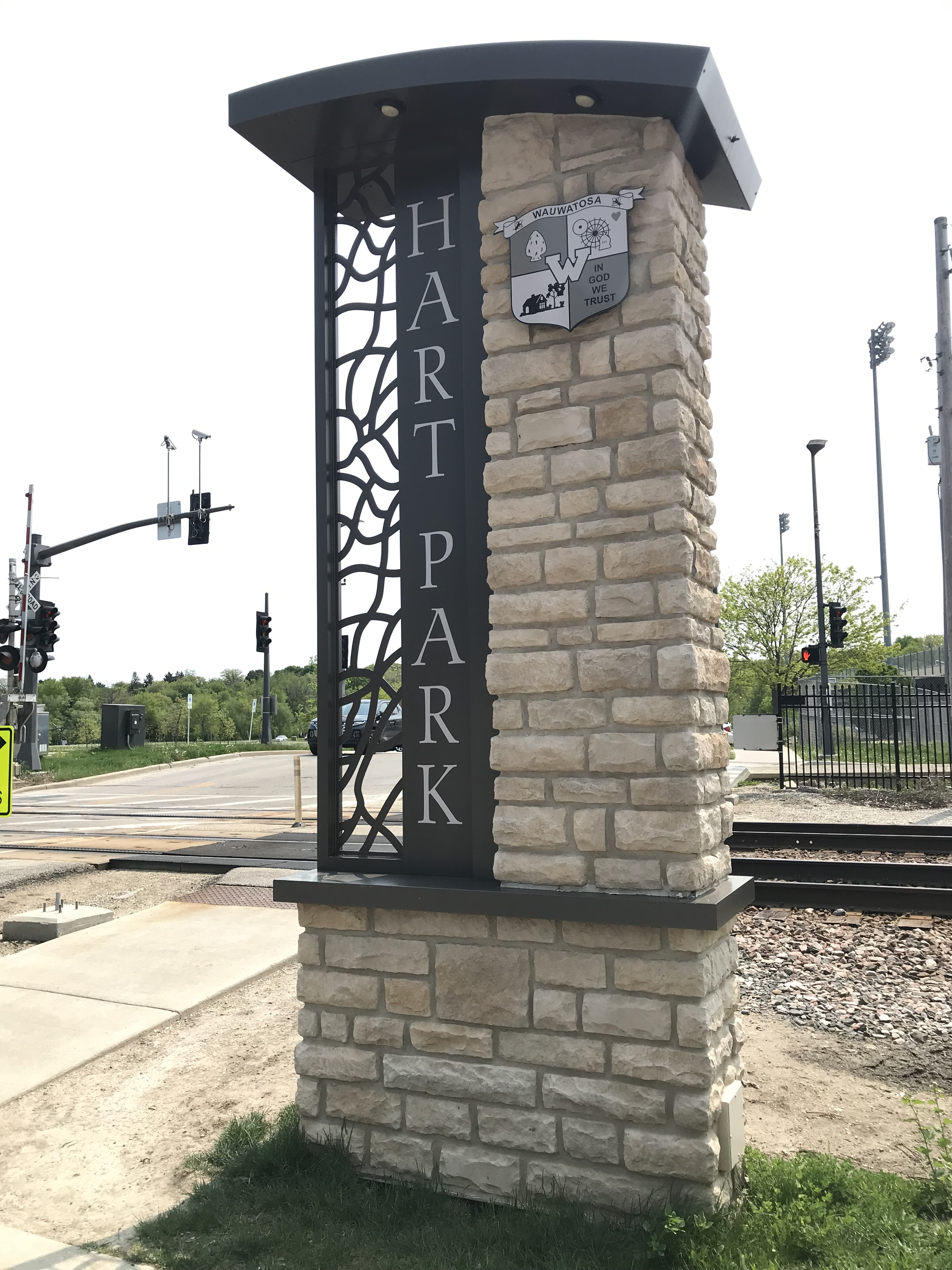
- Interactive map of Hart Park
- Former names: City Park (1921–1960)
- Address: 7300 Chestnut Street; Wauwatosa, WI 53213
- Owner: City of Wauwatosa Parks and Forestry Division
- Capacity: 4,900
- Surface: artificial turf

Construction
- Opened: 1921
- Renovated: 1926; 1929; 1938; 1940; 1942; 1958; 2067; 2013; 2020

Tenants
- Wauwatosa East High School (WIAA); Marquette University High School (WIAA); Marquette Golden Eagles (NCAA); Wauwatosa Curling Club (1925–present); FC Milwaukee Torrent (NPSL) (2017–present); Forward Madison FC (USL1) (2020)

Website
- Venue website

Hart Park is a 19.5-acre (7.9 ha) park on the Menomonee River in Wauwatosa, Wisconsin. Created in 1921 and originally known as City Park, the park has a football/soccer field, baseball diamond, field house, several tennis courts, a skate park, and nature trails. In 1960, to commemorate Wauwatosa's 125th anniversary, the common council named the park Charles Hart Park to recognize the city's founder.

A curling facility, sports fields, tennis courts and skating rink were established by 1926. The field house, constructed by the Works Progress Administration, opened in 1929. The WPA made many improvements to the park, including the addition of stone walls, a new football field, bleachers, an indoor curling rink and a parking lot. The roller rink and baseball diamonds opened in 1942.

The athletic field is artificial turf and can host high school and college football, soccer, field hockey, and lacrosse.

It is currently used as the home field for the NCAA Marquette Golden Eagles lacrosse teams and, as of 2017, the Milwaukee Torrent soccer team of the NPSL and WPSL .

Due to the COVID-19 pandemic, Hart Park hosted Forward Madison FC as their home venue for the 2020 USL League One season.

The park, including its artificial turf field, sustained major damage on August 9-10, 2025 after a major flash flooding event caused flooding throughout the Menomonee River valley, which included much of the Torrent's equipment in storage beneath the stadium's seating sections.
