= Green Bay Glory =

American soccer club

- Founded: January 11, 2019; 7 years ago
- Stadium: Banta Bowl; Appleton, Wisconsin
- Owner: Kerry Geocaris; Melissa Cruz-Cuene
- League: Women's Premier Soccer League; Midwest Premier League
- 2025: Women: 4th, Lake Michigan; Playoffs: did not qualify Men: 5th, Heartland Division 1
- Website: www.greenbayglory.com

Green Bay Glory is an American soccer club based in Appleton, Wisconsin. The organization was founded in 2019 and currently fields a women's squad, which plays in Women's Premier Soccer League, and a men's squad, which plays in the Midwest Premier League.

== Women's team history ==
On January 11, 2019, Kerry Geocaris and Melissa Cruz-Cuene announced a new Women's Premier Soccer League (WPSL) team in Green Bay. Geocaris, a Green Bay native, had previously played for the Milwaukee Torrent in the WPSL and cited a lack of competitive women's soccer opportunities in the Green Bay area as a major factor in forming the Glory. The team was announced to play in the newly-formed Midwest Division as one of 29 expansion teams for the league. During the 2019 season, they played at Aldo Santaga Stadium at the University of Wisconsin–Green Bay.

The team's 2020 and 2021 seasons were cancelled due to the COVID-19 pandemic. Prior to the 2022 season, the Green Bay Glory departed the WPSL and joined the USL W League, and moved to Capital Credit Union Park in Ashwaubenon. The team added former United States women's national team forward and Appleton, Wisconsin, native Sarah Hagen to the coaching staff.

The team returned to the WPSL for the 2024 season.

=== Current squad ===
As of September 18, 2023

Note: Flags indicate national team as defined under FIFA eligibility rules; some limited exceptions apply. Players may hold more than one non-FIFA nationality.

| No. | Pos. | Nation | Player |
|---|---|---|---|
| 0 | GK | USA | Mallory Kerhin |
| 2 | MF | USA | Maria Sorensen |
| 4 | MF | USA | Elizabeth Behnke |
| 5 | DF | USA | Kristina Jazdzewksi |
| 6 | FW | BRA | Carolina Martins Gomes |
| 7 | MF | USA | Brenna Musser |
| 8 | FW | USA | Rachael Janes |
| 10 | MF | USA | McKayla Kertscher |
| 11 | MF | USA | Margaret Thillman |
| 15 | DF | USA | Alyssa Mericle |
| 17 | FW | USA | Anna Boyd |
| 22 | MF | USA | Lucy Quidzinski |
| 23 | MF | USA | Jordan Schaden |
| 25 | MF | USA | Tirzah Lange |
| 26 | DF | USA | Brianna Morrissey |
| 27 | DF | USA | Maya Alberts |
| 29 | DF | USA | Skylar Prentice |
| 31 | FW | USA | Myla Stewart |

=== Year-by-year record ===
| Season | P | W | L | D | GF | GA | Pts | Pos | Playoffs | Head Coach |
Women's Premier Soccer League
| 2019 | 10 | 4 | 5 | 1 | 17 | 16 | 13 | 3rd, Lake Michigan | Did not qualify | |
| 2020 | Season cancelled due to COVID-19 pandemic | | | | | | | | | |
| 2021 | Season cancelled due to COVID-19 pandemic | | | | | | | | | |
USL W League
| 2022 | 12 | 6 | 3 | 3 | 19 | 17 | 21 | 2nd, Heartland | Did not qualify | (United States) Linda Moynihan Vance |
| 2023 | 12 | 4 | 8 | 0 | 14 | 28 | 12 | 5th, Heartland | Did not qualify | (United States) Linda Moynihan Vance |
Women's Premier Soccer League
| 2024 | 8 | 5 | 3 | 0 | 15 | 9 | 15 | 2nd, Lake Michigan | Did not qualify | |
| 2025 | 10 | 5 | 4 | 1 | 20 | 17 | 16 | 4th, Lake Michigan | Did not qualify | |
| 2026 | 10 | 2 | 6 | 2 | 15 | 23 | 8 | 5th, Lake Shore | Did not qualify | (United States) Kerry Geocaris |

== Men's team history ==
On February 7, 2024, the Green Bay Glory announced that they would be expanding with a men's squad, set to compete in the Heartland Division of the Midwest Premier League. The team plays its home games at the Banta Bowl on the campus of Lawrence University in Appleton.

=== Year-by-year record ===
| Champions | Runners-up | Promoted | Relegated |

| Season | P | W | L | D | GF | GA | Pts | Pos | Playoffs | Head Coach |
Midwest Premier League
| 2024 | 12 | 8 | 4 | 0 | 33 | 16 | 24 | 2nd, Heartland Division 2 | N/A | |
| 2025 | 12 | 5 | 5 | 2 | 24 | 32 | 17 | 5th, Heartland Division 1 | N/A | |
| 2026 | 10 | 4 | 4 | 2 | 17 | 17 | 14 | 3rd, Heartland Division 1 | N/A | |

== Stadium ==
| Name | Location | Years | Team |
|---|---|---|---|
| Aldo Santaga Stadium | Green Bay, Wisconsin | 2019 | Women |
| Capital Credit Union Park | Ashwaubenon, Wisconsin | 2022–2024 | Women |
| Banta Bowl | Appleton, Wisconsin | 2023–present | Women |
| Banta Bowl | Appleton, Wisconsin | 2024–present | Men |
