= NIU Soccer and Track & Field Complex =

Stadium in DeKalb, Illinois, United States

Coordinates: 41°56′4.1″N 88°46′55.2″W

NIU Soccer Complex
- Interactive map of NIU Soccer Complex
- Full name: NIU Soccer and Track & Field Complex
- Address: DeKalb, IL; United States
- Location: Dr W street
- Owner: Northern Illinois University
- Operator: NIU Athletics
- Capacity: 1,500
- Type: Stadium
- Surface: FIFA 2-Star Certified FieldTurf
- Current use: Soccer; Track and field

Construction
- Opened: 2008; 18 years ago

Tenants
- Northern Illinois Huskies (NCAA) Men's soccer (2008–present); Women's soccer (2008–present); Women's track and field (2008–present) DeKalb County United (MWPL) 2018–present

Website
- niuhuskies.com/niu-soccer-complex

The NIU Soccer and Track & Field Complex is a multi-purpose stadium located on the campus of Northern Illinois University (NIU) in DeKalb, Illinois, United States. The 1,500-seat stadium, completed in 2008, is home to three Northern Illinois Huskies programs: men's soccer, women's soccer, and women's outdoor track and field. Since 2018, it has also hosted the semi-professional soccer team DeKalb County United, a member of the Midwest Premier League.

== Soccer ==
The interior of the track houses the pitch for the NIU men's and women's soccer teams. The turf was built to the specification of FIFA 2-Star Certified Field Turf, meaning it is the highest quality artificial soccer surface available.

== Track and field ==
The complex is equipped with an eight-lane track, which includes an eight-lane straightaway. The track surface is made with a state-of-the-art material that is nearly impermeable to damage from rain and snow.

The complex has two large "D" zones, which allows for simultaneous track and field events.

The north zone houses the high jump area. Opposite the high jump area is an area for the pole vault, while the west side of the track is home to three jump pits. The complex's two shot put rings, hammer/discus ring and javelin runway are located to the south of the track.

== Other features ==
The entrance is located on the northwest side of the complex with bleachers located along the east side of the field providing a clear line of sight for the action on the pitch or on the track. Parking is located to the west of the complex in the adjacent NIU Convocation Center parking lot.
