= DeKalb County United =

- Full name: DeKalb County United
- Nicknames: DKCU; United; The Greens
- Founded: 2017
- Ground: NIU Soccer and Track & Field Complex
- Capacity: 1,500
- Board President: John Hall
- Head Coaches: Mike Gecan (2017 - 2021); Tim Romanello (2022 - )
- League: Midwest Premier League
- Website: http://www.dkcunited.com/
Home colors	Away colors

Dekalb County United is a semi-professional soccer club based out of DeKalb, Illinois. The men's team currently competes in the Midwest Premier League, and plays home games at the NIU Soccer and Track & Field Complex, while their women's team competes in United Women's Soccer.

== History ==
DeKalb County United was founded in 2017 by DeKalb area natives. The club was established in order to unite the communities of DeKalb County and surrounding areas through soccer. Though the club is relatively new to the area, its members, fans, and staff have been dedicated to making an impact both on the pitch, and in their local community. The club made an introduction to the local public when they held a jersey reveal party at a local bar and grille.

In April 2017, the club was decided to be not-for-profit, and as such assembled a Board of Directors, which consisted of the team's founders John and Jenny Hall, Colby Newquist, Brian VanBuren and Steve Duran.

DeKalb County United had a modest first season in the UPSL in 2018, finishing 5th in the Midwestern Central conference, with 12 points, and a record of 4-0-6 (W-D-L), with wins coming in both games against Union Dubuque F.C. and Joliet United.

DeKalb County United began play in the UPSL Midwest Central in April 2019, with matches against Cedar Rapids Inferno, Croatian Eagles SC, Milwaukee Bavarian SC, and Union Dubuque. In May 2019, just as the regular season was about to kick off, Madison 56ers announced that they would not be playing in the UPSL for the 2019 season, reducing division membership to five teams. On the season, they finished second in the UPSL's Midwest Conference Central Division with a record of 3-3-2 (W-D-L) for 12 points, losing only to the defending national champions in Milwaukee Bavarian SC. Overall, the club was 8-4-3 in all competitions including an opening-round loss in the Illinois Soccer Cup.

Key players for the 2019 season were: GK Patrik Smith, F Alberto Martinez, F/M Lucasz Sulka, D Dusty Smith, M Antonio Reyes, and M Jose Martinez.

The club also started a U-23 team in 2019, with players like Jose Martinez getting a call up to play for the first team during the season.

During the season, midfielder Leo Lenth was signed by Milwaukee Torrent of the NPSL to play for the team in the upcoming Fall season.

On October 2, 2019, the club announced that they would be leaving the United Premier Soccer League to join the newly formed Midwest Premier League
