= Lansing Common FC =

Semi-Professional Soccer team in Lansing, Michigan, U.S.

- Full name: Lansing Common Football Club
- Nickname: The Robins
- Founded: July 27, 2020; 5 years ago
- Stadium: Eastern High School; Lansing, Michigan
- Capacity: ~2,500
- Head coach: Brent Sorg
- League: Midwest Premier League
- Website: https://lansingcommonfc.com/

Lansing Common Football Club is a Midwest Premier League expansion team that began play in Spring 2021. As a result of Lansing Ignite FC being dissolved in October 2019 due to the ownership's financial strain, a group of fans led by Eric Walcott and Geoff Sykes formed a plan to create the supporter-owned team. They are one of twelve Michigan-based teams playing in the Eastern Division.

The team plays its home games at Eastern High School in Lansing, Michigan.

== Colors and crest ==
The club colors are brown, red-orange, and turquoise. The club crest was designed by founder Sykes, who is also the director of team branding and design for Lansing-based Moneyball Sportswear. The crest is a roundel featuring an American Robin, the Michigan state bird, standing in front of Lansing's famous three smoke stacks known as Wink'n, Blink'n, and Nod.

== History ==
Lansing Common FC joined the Midwest Premier League (MWPL), a semi-professional and amateur league who operates under a partnership agreement with the National Independent Soccer Association, a USSF Division 3 professional league, which includes pathways for both players and clubs to go fully pro. Lansing Common FC played their first game on May 15, 2021, ending in a 3–1 win over Fort Wayne Sport Club. Lansing Common FC finished their inaugural season second in their division, with Eastern Illinois University forward Shady Omar winning the 2021 Golden Boot with 10 goals scored for The Robins. They followed up this performance with another second place divisional finish in 2022.

=== 2022 season ===
==== Eastern Division ====
This division contained 11 teams for the 2022 season.

Pos	Team	P	GP	GD
1	Inter Detroit (C)	21	10	5
2	Lansing Common	20	10	10
3	Tulip City United	20	10	10
4	Michigan Jaguars	18	10	9
5	Cedars FC	16	10	0
6	Grand Haven Admirals	14	10	4
7	Michigan Stars U23	14	10	1
8	Livonia City	12	10	-1
9	West Michigan Bearings	9	10	-7
10	Detroit Union	6	10	-17
11	BiH Grand Rapids	5	10	-15

Rules for classification: P) points; (GP) games played; (GD) goal differential; (C) Champion

=== 2021 Fall Season ===
==== East Division ====
This division contained 8 teams for the 2021 season.

Pos	Team	P	GP	GD
1	Detroit City U23 (C)	39	14	29
2	Lansing Common	31	14	21
3	West Michigan Bearings	27	14	15
4	BiH Grand Rapids	20	14	7
5	Michigan Stars U23	19	14	1
6	Livonia City	9	14	-18
7	Inter Detroit	8	14	-18
8	LK St Clair	5	14	-37

Rules for classification: P) points; (GP) games played; (GD) goal differential; (C) Champion
