= Midwest Premier League =

Soccer league

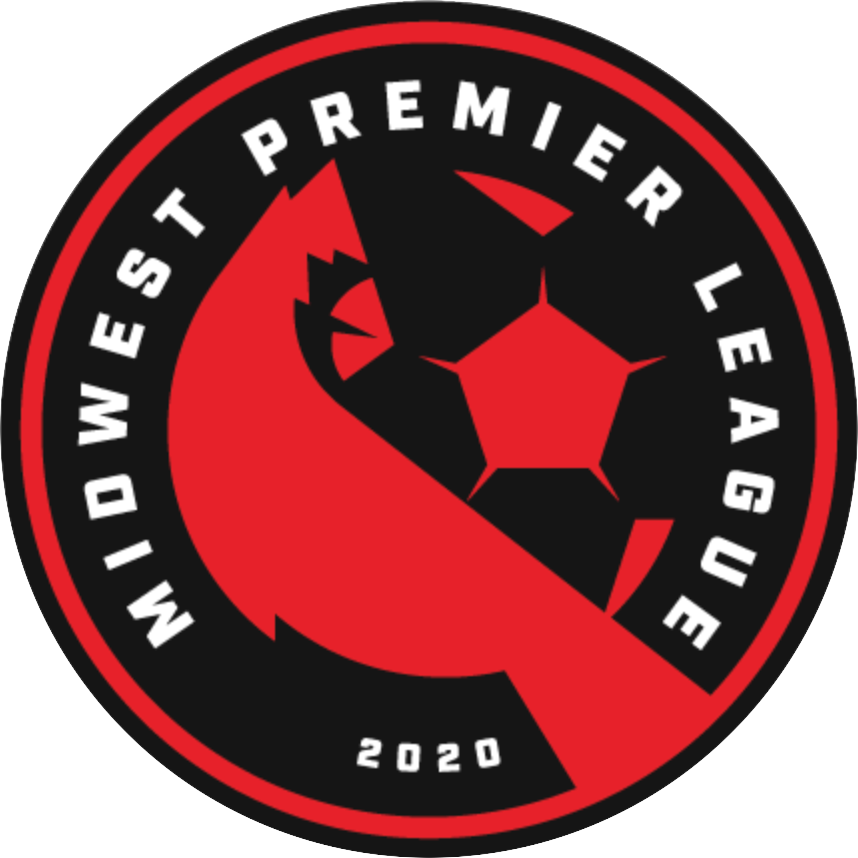
- Founded: 2019
- First season: 2021
- Country: United States
- Confederation: CONCACAF
- Divisions: 3 conferences & 6 divisions
- Number of clubs: 53
- Domestic cup(s): U.S. Open Cup (via qualifying tournament & NAC); National Amateur Cup (via USASA Region II)
- International cup(s): CONCACAF Champions League (via U.S. Open Cup)
- Current champions: Goshen City FC (Great Lakes), Linoma FC (Gateway), RWB Adria Chicago (Heartland Division 1), Edgewater Castle FC (Heartland Division 2) (2025 season)
- Most championships: Milwaukee Bavarian SC; Ajax St. Louis; Inter Detroit (2 division titles)
- Website: midwestpl.com
- Current: 2026 MWPL season

The Midwest Premier League (MWPL) is an American amateur and semi-professional soccer league. The league spans primarily the eastern and central portions of the Midwestern United States.

== History ==
The league was founded by four clubs which were all previously members of the United Premier Soccer League Midwest Conference. Following the 2019 UPSL season, the clubs decided that they could create a stable league that would focus on sustainability of the member clubs by sharing ideas, keeping league costs to a minimum, and maximizing the opportunities for all clubs to compete by limiting end-of-season playoffs that often shorten the season for many teams.

The league announced Union Dubuque F.C. as its first member on September 18, 2019, with the other three founding members being announced in the subsequent weeks. RWB Adria joins the MPWL on September 25, 2019. DeKalb County United joins the MWPL on October 2, 2019. Cedar Rapids Inferno join the MWPL on October 9, 2019 making it the fourth member team. And concludes the joining of the founders.

Cliff Conrad has been elected as the league's first president. Conrad is the co-founder and president of Union Dubuque F.C., one of the league's charter members.

After a period with no expansion news, FC Diablos of Normal, Illinois, was announced on January 10, 2020, and an expansion continues into March. With expansion side Rockford FC being unveiled shortly thereafter on January 30, 2020. Livonia City FC joins the MWPL on Feb. 29th 2020. Lake St.Clair joins the MWPL on March 2, 2020. BiH Grand Rapids joins the MWPL on March 6, 2020.

The league was set to kick off in spring 2020; however, the season was cancelled due to the COVID-19 pandemic in the United States.

The Midwest Premier League appoints Andy Hayes as the league's first commissioner.

On July 27, 2020, the league announced Lansing Common FC from Lansing, Michigan, as a new member club.

On September 3, 2020, the MWPL entered a partnership agreement with the National Independent Soccer Association, a USSF Division 3 professional league, which includes pathways for both players and clubs to go fully pro.

November 2020 kicked off another round of expansions for the league. Starting with Edgewater Castle FC on Nov. 27th 2020.

In the spring of 2021 MWPL launched its inaugural season with 20 teams in two divisions. 12 teams in the West Division and 8 teams in the East Division.

It was announced on March 21, 2022 that the MWPL would have 3 Divisions within it.

The schedule for the second season of the league was announced on April 6, 2022, nearly a month ahead of the first game. With Detroit City U23 gone, there would be a new champion in the East Division. And with a finalized Southern Division, 3 champions were to be crowned at the end of the 2022 season.

A new conference alignment was announced by the league on February 6, 2023. The MWPL confirmed that for the 2023 season, the South Conference would now be known as the Gateway Conference, the West Conference would now be the Heartland Conference and the East Conference would be the Great Lakes Conference, with an East and West Division.

On October 27, 2023 MWPL announced plans to implement promotion and regulation within the league starting with the Heartland Conference.

MWPL announced a strategic partnership with The League for Clubs (TLFC) on May 19, 2025. The partnership is intended to create a new TLFC Midwest conference that will sit on top of the MWPL to facilitate promotion and relegation between the leagues.

== Teams ==
Team	City	Stadium	Founded
Great Lakes Conference
West Division
1927 SC	Fort Wayne, IN	Fort Wayne Sport Club Fields	1927
Grand Rapids SC	Grand Rapids, MI	Mehney Field	2024
Goshen City FC	Goshen, IN	Goshen College Soccer Complex	2022
Holland Struikrovers	Holland, MI	Mac Bay Soccer Stadium	2016
Lansing Common FC	Lansing, MI	Eastern High School Stadium	2020
Midwest United FC U23	Grand Rapids, MI	Midwest United FC Soccer Complex	2015
Tulip City United SC	Holland, MI	Holland High School	2020
East Division
Cedars FC	Dearborn, MI	Fordson High School	2019
FC Pontiac	Pontiac, MI	Wisner Stadium	2025
Futsal Factory Academy	Dexter, MI	Dexter High School	2014
Legends FC	Brighton, MI	Legacy Center Sports Complex	
Michigan Development Academy	Pontiac, MI	UWM Sports Complex	2021
Michigan Jaguars FC	Novi, MI	Walled Lake Central High School	1989
Oakland County FC	Royal Oak, MI	Royal Oak High School	2015
Toledo Villa FC	Toledo, OH	Paul Hotmer Field	2017
Heartland Conference
Division 1
AFC Roscoe	Chicago, IL	Lions for Hope Sports Complex	2022
Bavarian United SC	Glendale, WI	Heartland Value Fund Stadium	1929
Cedar Rapids Inferno	Cedar Rapids, IA	Kingston Stadium	2019
Chicago House AC	Chicago, IL	Elmhurst University	2021
Edgewater Castle FC	Chicago, IL	CIBC Fire Pitch	2017
Green Bay Glory	Appleton, WI	Banta Bowl	2019
Division 2
AAC Eagles	Chicago, IL	Triton College	1940
Berber City FC	Chicago, IL	Illinois Institute of Technology	2013
Chicago City SC	Chicago, IL	Lions for Hope Sports Complex	2013
Chicago Ghost FC	Chicago, IL	Loyola Academy Munz	2018
Chicago Soccer Academy	Chicago, IL	East Side Sports Complex	2014
Czarni Jaslo	Chicago, IL	Olympic Park, Schaumburg	1998
DeKalb County United	DeKalb, IL	NIU Soccer and Track & Field Complex	2017
FC Select	Chicago, IL	Lazier Field	2018
JaHbat FC	Evanston, IL	Evanston Township High School	1996
Madison Fire	Madison, WI	Bank of Sun Prairie Stadium	
River Light FC	Aurora, IL	Spartan Athletic Park	2024
RKC Third Coast II	Mount Pleasant, WI	Pritchard Park Stadium	2022
Steel City FC	Joliet, IL	Duly Health and Care Field	2021
Sueño FC	Bolingbrook, IL	Bolingbrook High School	
Gateway Conference
West Division
AFC Columbia	Columbia, MO	R. Marvin Owens Field	2020
First City FC	Leavenworth, KS	Pioneer Stadium	
Great Plains FC	Shawnee, KS	Maranatha Christian Academy	
Southside FC	Grandview, MO	Grandview High School	2023
Union FC	Kansas City, MO	Paragon Star Sports Complex	2005
Woodland FC	Overland Park, KS	Shawnee Mission District Stadium	2023
East Division
314 SC	Saint Louis, MO	Creve Coeur Park Soccer Complex	2020
BOHFS St. Louis	Saint Louis, MO	St. Mary's High School	
Ehtar Belleville	Belleville, IL	Althoff Catholic High School	2022
FC Kirkwood	Kirkwood, MO	Sandhurst Soccer Complex	2026
Pearl City SC	Muscatine, IA	Muscatine Soccer Complex	2016
Southeast Soccer Academy	Burlington, IA	Bracewell Stadium	1997
St. Louis Fusion FC	Saint Louis, MO	Lou Fusz Athletic Complex	2021
St. Louis Scott Gallagher U23	Saint Louis, MO	World Wide Technology Soccer Park	2008
St. Louis Stars SC	Saint Louis, MO	Cottleville City Fields	
STL Development Academy	Maryland Heights, MO	Sportport International	
United Capital City Athletic	Jefferson City, MO	Mid America Bank Sports Complex	

=== Location map ===
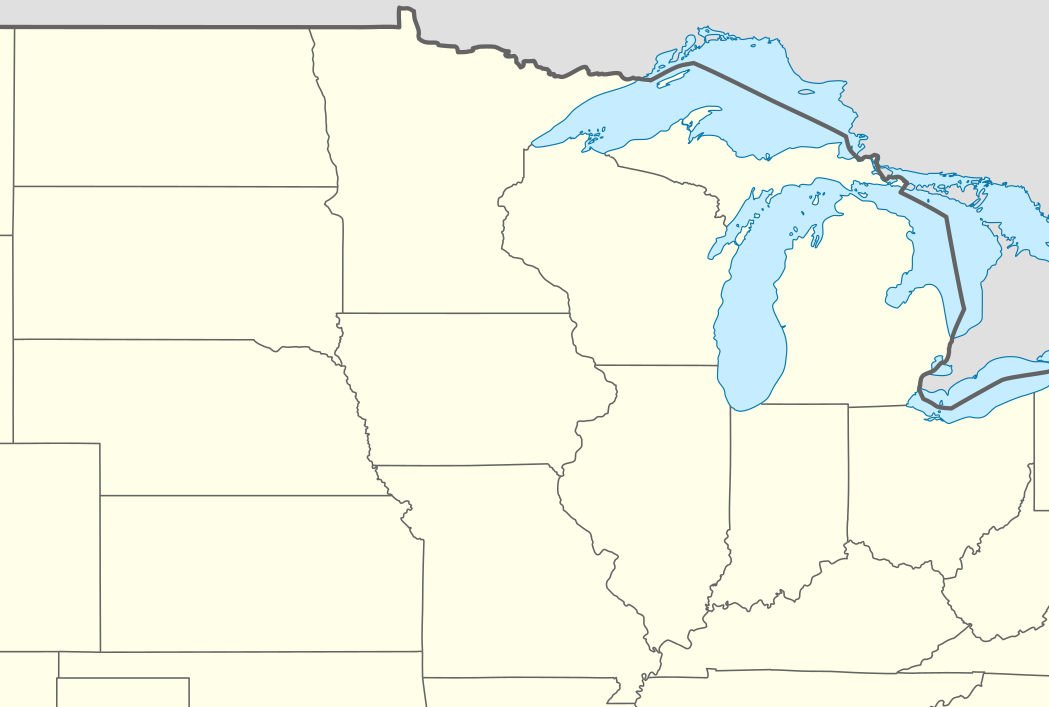
Current team locations:
- Heartland Conference
- Great Lakes Conference
- Gateway Conference

=== Former teams ===
Team	City	Joined	Final season	Fate
LK St. Clair	Mount Clemens, MI	2020	2021	Left league
Chicago Athletic	Bensenville, IL	2021		Left league
Chicago Mustangs	Crystal Lake, IL	2021		Left league
Detroit City FC U23	Hamtramck, MI	2021		Left league
Union Dubuque	Dubuque, IA	2021		suspended
FC Diablos	Bloomington, IL	2021		suspended operations
Aim SC	Dearborn, MI	2012	2023	
Detroit Union FC	Waterford, MI	2021	2023	
BiH Grand Rapids	Grand Rapids, MI	2018	2023	
United West FC	Grand Rapids, MI	2023		
Livonia City FC	Livonia, MI	2015	2023	
West Michigan Bearings	Byron Center, MI	2020	2023	
Iowa Raptors FC	Cedar Rapids, IA	2019	2023	
Santa Fe Wanderers	Kansas City, KS	1995	2023	
Thundercats SC	Chesterfield, MI	2024		
YPSI Yetis FC	Saline, MI	2023	2024	
Ajax St. Louis	St. Louis, MO	2022	2024	
Club Atletico Saint Louis	Saint Louis, MO	2018	2025	
Detroit Badgers FC	Dearborn Heights, MI	2025	2025	
Inter Detroit FC	Auburn Hills, MI		2025	
Liquid Football	Detroit, MI	2022	2025	
Michigan Stars U23	Washington Township, MI		2025	
RWB Adria	Chicago, IL		2025	
Rockford FC	Rockford, IL		2025	
Strikers Fox Valley SC	Geneva, IL		2025	
AFC Omaha	Omaha, NE		2025	
CB Captains FC	Council Bluffs, IA		2025	
Linoma FC	Omaha, NE	2025	2025	
Warrior FC	Everly, IA		2025	

== Seasons ==
=== 2021 Fall Season ===
The first season for the MWPL ended on August 1, 2021

The Eastern division contained 8 teams for the 2021 season.

This Western division contained 12 teams for the 2021 season.

Eastern Division Standings
Pos	Team	P	GP	GD
1	Detroit City U23 (C)	39	14	29
2	Lansing Common	31	14	21
3	West Michigan Bearings	27	14	15
4	BiH Grand Rapids	20	14	7
5	Michigan Stars U23	19	14	1
6	Livonia City	9	14	-18
7	Inter Detroit	8	14	-18
8	LK St Clair	5	14	-37
Western Division Standings
Pos	Team	P	GP	GD
1	Milwaukee Bavarian (C)	28	11	24
2	RWB Adria	28	11	21
3	Steel City	20	11	7
4	Berber City	20	11	4
5	Cedar Rapids Inferno	16	11	-2
6	Union Dubuque	15	11	-8
7	FC Diablos	14	11	2
8	Chicago Mustangs	13	11	1
9	Edgewater Castle	12	11	-6
10	Rockford	9	11	-9
11	Dekalb County	7	11	-15
12	Chicago Athletic	4	11	-19

Rules for classification: P) points; (GP) games played; (GD) goal differential;

(C) Champion

=== 2022 season ===
The first season with 3 divisions in it.

The Eastern division contained 11 teams for the 2022 season.

The Western division contained 12 teams for the 2022 season

The Southern division contained 4 teams for the 2022 season.

Eastern Division Standings
Pos	Team	P	GP	GD
1	Inter Detroit (C)	21	10	5
2	Lansing Common	20	10	10
3	Tulip City United	20	10	10
4	Michigan Jaguars	18	10	9
5	Cedars FC	16	10	0
6	Grand Haven Admirals	14	10	4
7	Michigan Stars U23	14	10	1
8	Livonia City	12	10	-1
9	West Michigan Bearings	9	10	-7
10	Detroit Union	6	10	-17
11	BiH Grand Rapids	5	10	-15
Western Division Standings
Pos	Team	P	GP	GD
1	Milwaukee Bavarian (C)	24	11	23
2	RWB Adria	24	11	21
3	Iowa Raptors	24	11	18
4	Chicago House AC	20	11	18
5	DeKalb County United	17	11	1
6	Steel City	15	11	3
7	Chicago City SC	14	11	-1
8	Rockford FC	14	11	-6
9	Cedar Rapids Inferno	14	11	-14
10	Berber City	8	11	-11
11	FC Diablos	7	11	-24
12	Edgewater Castle	3	11	-28
Southern Division Standings
Pos	Team	P	GP	GD
1	Ajax St. Louis (C)	15	6	2
2	AFC Columbia	12	6	6
3	Santa Fe Wanderers	6	5	0
4	Springfield FC	0	5	-10

Rules for classification: P) points; (GP) games played; (GD) goal differential;

(C) Champion

=== 2023 Season ===
The first season with 4 divisions.

Gateway Division Standings
Pos	Team	P	GP	GD
1	Ajax St. Louis (C)	22	10	19
2	Cedar Rapids Inferno	19	10	8
3	Iowa Raptors FC	16	10	1
4	AFC Columbia	14	10	-3
5	Club Atletico Saint Louis	12	10	0
6	Southeast Soccer Academy	3	10	-25
N/A	Santa Fe Wanderers			
Great Lakes West Division Standings
Pos	Team	P	GP	GD
1	1927 SC (C)	27	12	21
2	West Michigan Bearings SC	27	12	20
3	Lansing Common FC	24	12	18
4	Tulip City United SC	20	12	9
5	Livonia City FC	20	12	3
6	BiH Grand Rapids	10	12	-11
7	Futsal Factory Academy	8	12	-4
8	Holland Rovers FC	6	12	-40
9	United West FC	4	12	-35
Heartland Division Standings
Pos	Team	P	GP	GD
1	Czarni Jalso (C)	23	10	14
2	RWB Adria	19	10	15
3	Chicago House AC	18	10	23
4	Bavarian United	16	10	9
5	Dekalb United	16	10	8
6	Chicago City SC	15	10	12
7	Edgewater Castle FC	14	10	2
8	Steel City FC	14	10	-3
9	Berber City FC	11	10	-6
10	Indy Boyz FC	7	10	-35
11	Rockford FC	2	10	-39
Great Lakes East Division Standings
Pos	Team	P	GP	GD
1	Inter Detroit FC (C)	28	12	37
2	Liquid Football	26	12	9
3	Thundercats SC	19	12	5
4	Michigan Stars FC U23	19	12	2
5	Detroit Union FC	18	12	-3
6	Cedars FC	17	12	-3
7	Troy United FC	16	12	-9
8	Michigan Jaguars FC	13	12	-1
9	Aim SC	4	12	-20

Rules for classification: P) points; (GP) games played; (GD) goal differential;

(C) Champion

=== 2024 Season ===
The first season with 5 divisions in it.

The Gateway division contained 8 teams for the 2024 season.

The Great Lakes East division contained 10 teams for the 2024 season

The Great Lakes West division contained 6 teams for the 2024 season.

The Heartland Division was split up into two division for the 2024 season. Withe promotion and relegation between the two.

The Heartland division 1 contained 6 teams for the 2024 season.

The Heartland division 2 contained 7 teams for the 2024 season.

Gateway Conference Standings
Pos	Team	P	GP	GD
1	Cedar Rapids Inferno (C)	21	10	11
2	Ajax St. Louis	19	10	7
3	AFC Columbia	15	10	4
4	St. Louis Stars	13	10	-8
5	Club Atletico Saint Louis	13	10	-1
6	Pearl City SC	12	10	1
7	Junction FC	12	10	-2
8	Southeast Soccer Academy	7	10	-12
Great Lakes West Division Standings
Pos	Team	P	GP	GD
1	Northern Indiana FC (C)	28	10	25
2	1927 SC	25	10	30
3	Lansing Common FC	13	10	2
4	Holland Rovers FC	12	10	-1
5	Tulip City United SC	10	10	-3
6	Indy Boyz FC	0	10	-53
Great Lakes East Division Standings
Pos	Team	P	GP	GD
1	Cedars FC (C)	24	10	19
2	Michigan Stars FC U23	32	10	17
3	Thundercats SC	20	10	3
4	Liquid Football	18	10	4
5	Troy United	16	10	-2
6	Inter Detroit FC	13	10	0
7	Michigan Jaguars	10	10	-11
8	Futsal Factory Academy	8	10	-7
9	Livonia City FC	7	10	-3
10	Ypsi Yetis FC	4	10	-20
Heartland Division 1 Standings
Pos	Team	P	GP	GD
1	RWB Adria (C)	25	10	14
2	Bavarian United	20	10	7
3	Chicago House AC	19	10	9
4	Dekalb United	11	10	-6
5	Czarni Jalso	7	10	-12
6	Steel City FC (R)	4	10	-12
Heartland Division 2 Standings
1	AFC Roscoe (C, P)	29	12	17
2	Green Bay Glory (P)	24	12	17
3	Rockford FC	22	12	1
4	Edgewater Castle FC	19	12	6
5	Chicago Ghost FC	12	12	-17
6	Berber City FC	9	12	-11
7	Strikers Fox Valley SC	4	12	-13

Rules for classification: P) points; (GP) games played; (GD) goal differential;

(C) Champion (P) Promoted (R) Regulated

=== 2025 Season ===
Gateway North Division Standings
Pos	Team	P	GP	GD
1	Linoma FC (C)	22	8	29
2	Cedar Rapids Inferno	16	10	5
3	Pearl City SC	10	9	5
4	SESA	6	8	-22
Gateway South Division Standings
Pos	Team	P	GP	GD
1	Ethar Belleville FC (C)	23	10	11
2	BOHFS St. Louis	19	10	6
3	Club Atletico Saint Louis	18	10	2
4	St. Louis Stars	14	10	-2
5	STL Development Academy	10	10	-1
6	AFC Columbia	3	10	-13
Great Lakes West Division Standings
Pos	Team	P	GP	GD
1	Goshen City FC (C)	23	10	17
2	Lansing Common FC	19	10	4
3	Holland Rovers FC	17	10	3
4	Midwest United FC U23	16	10	-3
5	1927 SC	10	10	-5
6	Grand Rapids SC	8	10	-6
7	Tulip City United SC	6	10	-10
Great Lakes East Division Standings
Pos	Team	P	GP	GD
1	Cedars FC (C)	23	10	19
2	Michigan Stars FC U23	23	10	14
3	Michigan Jaguars	19	10	11
4	Troy United	18	10	6
5	Liquid Football	17	10	7
6	MI Futsal Factory	15	10	5
7	Inter Detroit FC	11	10	-2
8	FC Pontiac	9	10	-4
9	Legends FC	6	9	-24
10	Detroit Badgers FC	0	9	-32
Heartland Division 1 Standings
Pos	Team	P	GP	GD
1	RWB Adria (C)	26	12	13
2	Chicago House AC	26	12	18
3	Bavarian United	20	12	17
4	AFC Roscoe	18	12	-3
5	Green Bay Glory	17	12	-8
6	Dekalb United (R)	15	12	-13
7	Czarni Jalso (R)	0	12	-24
Heartland Division 2 Standings
Pos	Team	P	GP	GD
1	Edgewater Castle FC (C, P)	20	10	15
2	RKC Third Coast II	19	10	25
3	Steel City FC	17	10	6
4	Berber City FC	16	10	8
5	Chicago Ghost FC	16	10	3
6	Strikers Fox Valley SC	13	10	-1
7	Rockford FC	10	10	-4
7	Chicago City Dutch Lions	0	10	-52

Rules for classification: P) points; (GP) games played; (GD) goal differential;

(C) Champion (P) Promoted (R) Regulated

== Division Winners ==
Great Lakes Conference Winner

Note: Formerly the East Division

Season	Winner	Runner-up
2021	Detroit City U23	Lansing Common
2022	Inter Detroit	Lansing Common
2023	West: 1927 SC; East: Inter Detroit	West: West Michigan Bearings; East: Liquid Football
2024	West: Northern Indiana FC; East: Cedars FC	West: 1927 Fort Wayne FC; East: Michigan Stars FC U-23
2025	Goshen City FC	Cedars FC

Heartland Conference Winner

Note: Formerly the West Division

Season	Winner	Runner-up
2021	Milwaukee Bavarian SC	RWB Adria
2022	Milwaukee Bavarian	RWB Adria
2023	Czarni Jaslo	RWB Adria
2024	RWB Adria	Milwaukee Bavarian
2025	RWB Adria	Chicago House AC

Heartland Conference Division 2 Winner

Season	Winner	Runner-up
2024	AFC Roscoe	Green Bay Glory
2025	Edgewater Castle FC	RKC Third Coast II

Gateway Conference Winner

Note: Formerly the South Division

Season	Winner	Runner-up
2022	Ajax St. Louis	AFC Columbia
2023	Ajax St. Louis	Cedar Rapids Inferno
2024	Cedar Rapids Inferno	Ajax St. Louis
2025	Linoma FC	Ethar Belleville FC

== Golden Boot winner ==
The golden boot winners were announced on September 15, 2021.

Great Lakes Conference Winner
Season	Team	Winner	Goals
2021	Lansing Common	Shady Omar	10
2022	Cedars FC; Lansing Common; Lansing Common	Mohammad Hamoud; Guershom Sylvain; Jack Voight	6
2023	1927 SC	Higor Barbieri	10
2024	Liquid Football	Atoumane Dia	11
2025	Michigan Stars U23	Babacar Sene	11

Heartland Conference Winner
Season	Team	Winner	Goals
2021	FC Diablos	Jordan Walker	15
2022	Steel City FC	Shea Bechtel	9
2023	Chicago House AC	Kikis Avalos	9
2024	Chicago House AC	Kikis Avalos	8
2025	Chicago House AC	Kikis Avalos	10

Gateway Conference Winner
Season	Team	Winner	Goals
2022	Ajax St. Louis	Kevin Van Ralten	
2023	Ajax St. Louis; CA St. Louis	Devin Livingstone; Nedim Sarajlija	
2024	Junction FC	Kyle Johnson	8
2025	Linoma FC	Martin Herrera	8

== Notable players ==
The following players have either played at the professional or international level, either before or after playing for a Midwest Premier League team:

- (United States) Shady Omar, Lansing Common FC - 2021, played professionally at Ittihad El-Shorta (Egypt) 2015-2017 and Al Hilal Matruah (Egypt) in 2022
- (United States) Damon Almazan, Steel City FC - 2020, played professionally at Chicago House AC for a season (2021).
- (United States) Derek Huffman, RWB Adria - 2020, played professionally at Chicago House AC for a season (2021). Currently at Milwaukee Wave of the Major Arena Soccer League
- (United States) Stefan Mijatovic, RWB Adria - 2020, played professionally at Chicago House AC for a season (2021). Currently at Utica City FC of the Major Arena Soccer League
- (United States) (Bulgaria) George Chomakov, Liquid Football - 2023, played professionally at Detroit City FC for three seasons (2019–2021)
- (United States) (Hungary) Benedek Tanyi, Liquid Football - 2023, played professionally at Detroit City FC for two seasons (2021–2022).
- (Yemen) Albaraa Alsoufi, Liquid Football - 2023, played professionally at Gold Star FC for a season (2023).
