= FC Milwaukee Torrent =

American professional team

FC Milwaukee
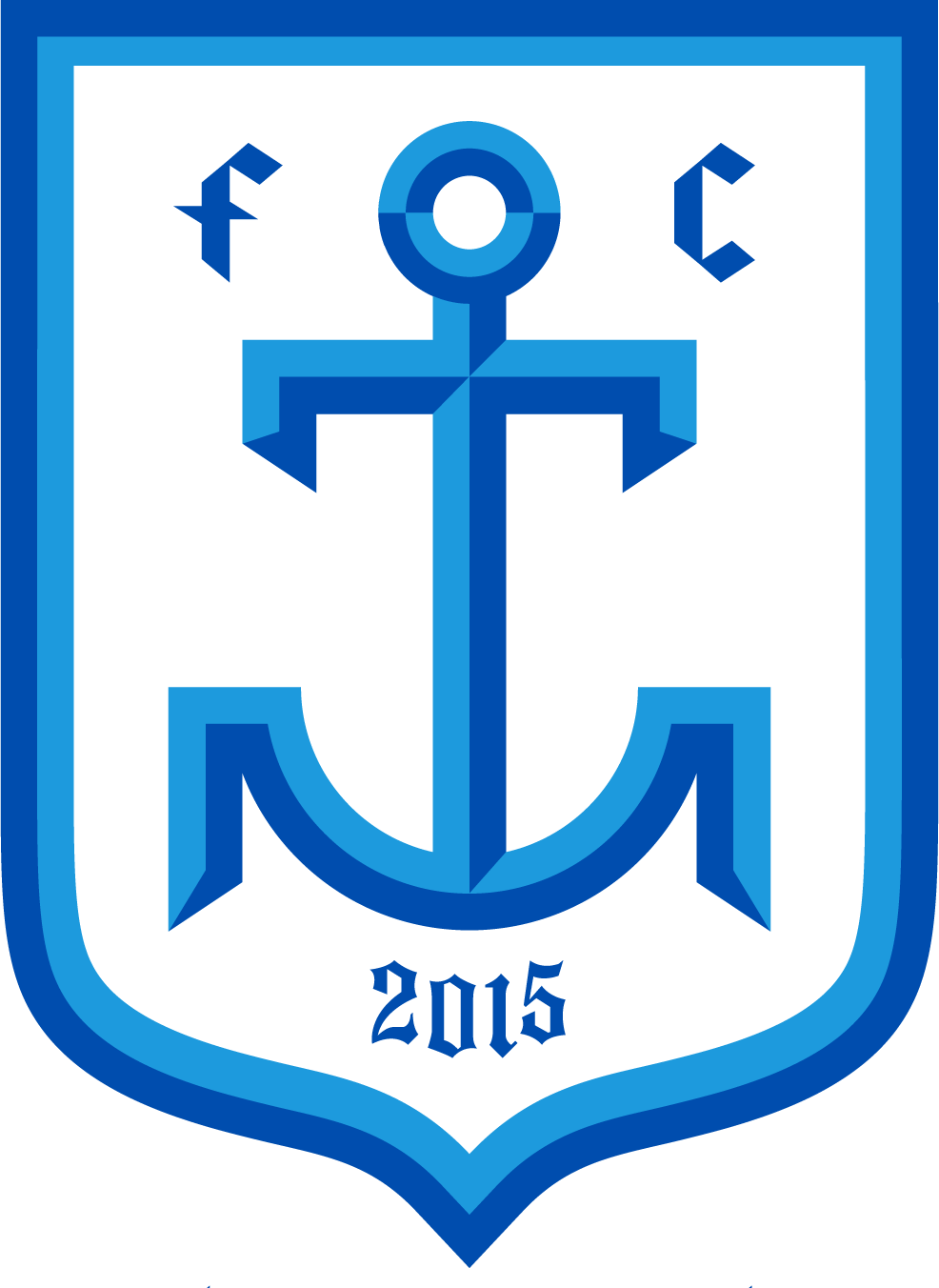
- FC Milwaukee Torrent
- Full name: Football Club Milwaukee Torrent
- Founded: January 2015; 11 years ago
- Stadium: Hart Park, Wauwatosa, Wisconsin
- Capacity: 4,900
- Owner: Andreas Davi
- Manager: Steve Provan
- Coach: Marcelo Fontana; Austin Backus
- League: National Premier Soccer League; Women's Premier Soccer League
- Website: milwaukeetorrent.com
Home colours

FC Milwaukee Torrent is an American soccer team based in Milwaukee, Wisconsin.

The club fields a men's and women's team. The men play in the National Premier Soccer League (NPSL), and the women play in the Women's Premier Soccer League (WPSL)

== History ==
In 2015, the team was founded, playing their inaugural season in 2016.

Since 2017, the team has played their home games at Hart Park in Wauwatosa, Wisconsin.

In the spring of 2017 the team announced the addition of a women's side to start play in the WPSL beginning with the 2018 season.

On 18 December 2018, the team announced in a press conference that Carlos Córdoba would be the Milwaukee Torrent's new head coach for the 2019 season.

On March 3, 2022, the team named Steve Provan as head coach for the NPSL squad ahead of the 2022 season.

=== Year by Year NPSL Men ===
Year	League	Regular Season	Playoffs	U.S. Open Cup	National Amateur Cup
2016	NPSL	1st, Central (6–0–0)	N/A (Note: The 2016 Central Conference played a provisional season with three expansion teams, including the Torrent, who were not eligible for the National Playoffs)	Not eligible	did not participate
2017	NPSL	7th, Great Lakes (3–6–5)	did not qualify	did not qualify	did not participate
2018	NPSL	6th, Great Lakes (3–5–4)	did not qualify	did not qualify	did not participate
2019	NPSL	Played in Members Cup Only (3-5-2)			did not participate
2020	NPSL	Season cancelled due to COVID-19 pandemic			
2021	NPSL	1st, Great Lakes (9–1–0)	Regional Semifinals	did not qualify	did not participate
2022	NPSL	4th, Great Lakes (2–6–2)	did not qualify	did not qualify	did not participate
2023	NPSL	2nd, Gateway (5–2–3)	Conference Finals	did not qualify	did not participate
2024	NPSL	4th, Gateway (5–2–2)	Conference Finals	did not qualify	2nd
2025	NPSL	2nd, Central States (8–0–2)	Conference Semifinals	did not qualify	Region II SF
2026	NPSL	4th, Central States (5–1–4)	Conference Semifinals	did not qualify	Region II QF

=== Tournaments ===
Name	Year	Group	Pos.	Pl.	W	D	L	GS	GA	Pts.	Playoffs	Top goalscorer	
Name	Year	Group	Pos.	Pl.	W	D	L	GS	GA	Pts.	Playoffs	Name	Total
NPSL Members Cup	2019	N/A	4th	10	3	2	5	10	12	10	N/A	(United States) Anthony Colaizzi (Argentina) Santiago D’imperio	2
NISA Independent Cup	2021	Midwest	1st	3	3	0	0	11	1	9	N/A		
NISA Independent Cup	2022	Great Lakes	2nd	2	1	0	1	5	2	11	N/A		
Totals				15	7	2	6						

=== Year by Year WPSL Women ===
Year	Regular Season	W	D	L	Playoffs
2018	3rd, Northern Conference	3	6	1	Did not qualify
2019	5th, Midwest Conference	3	3	4	Did not qualify
2020	Season cancelled due to COVID-19 pandemic				
2021	4th, Group N	4	3	3	Did not qualify
2022	1st, Group M	7	0	1	First Round
2023	1st, Lake Michigan Division	7	0	1	Region Semifinals
2024	1st, Lake Michigan Division	8	0	0	Midwest Conference Playoff
2025	1st, Lake Michigan Division	8	2	0	North Lakes Conference Playoff

== Honors ==
National Premier Soccer League

- Central Conference
  - Champion (1): 2016, 2021

NISA Independent Cup

- Midwest Region Champion: 2021

USASA Region II

- USASA Region II Amateur Cup Champions: 2024
