= 2005 NPSL season =

National Premier Soccer League
- Season: 2005
- Champions: Detroit Arsenal (1st Title)
- Regular Season Champions: Detroit Arsenal (1st Title)
- Matches: 93
- Goals: 330 (3.55 per match)

The 2005 National Premier Soccer League season was the 3rd season of the NPSL. Prior to the beginning of the year the league changed its name from the Mens Premier Soccer League to the National Premier Soccer League, to recognize the league's eastward expansion and the creation of the new Midwest Division.

Expansion franchise Detroit Arsenal finished the season as national champions, beating Sonoma County Sol in the NPSL Championship game

== Changes From 2004 ==
=== New franchises ===
- Eight franchises joined the league this year, all expansion franchises:

Team name	Metro area	Location	Previous affiliation
Detroit Arsenal	Detroit area	Berkley, MI	expansion
Grand Rapids Alliance	Grand Rapids area	Grand Rapids, MI	expansion
Milwaukee Bavarians	Milwaukee area	Milwaukee, WI	expansion
Minnesota Blast	Minneapolis area	Burnsville, MN	expansion
Princeton 56ers	Madison area	Madison, WI	expansion
San Diego Pumitas	San Diego area	San Diego, CA	expansion
Minnesota TwinStars (formerly St Paul TwinStars)	St. Paul area	St. Paul, MN	expansion

=== Folding ===
- Four teams left the league prior to the beginning of the season:
  - Arizona Sahuaros - Phoenix, Arizona
  - Idaho Wolves - Idaho Falls, Idaho
  - Northern Nevada Aces - Reno, Nevada
  - Utah Salt Ratz - Salt Lake City, Utah

== Final standings ==
Purple indicates division title clinched
Green indicates playoff berth clinched

=== West Division ===
Place	Team	P	W	L	T	GF	GA	GD	Points
1	Sacramento Knights	18	12	4	2	42	20	22	38
2	Sonoma County Sol	18	11	5	2	26	16	20	35
3	Chico Rooks	18	8	6	4	32	27	5	28
4	Salinas Valley Samba	18	8	7	3	29	25	4	24
5	Albuquerque Asylum	18	4	7	7	23	32	-9	19
6	San Diego Pumitas	18	4	8	6	32	34	-2	18
7	Las Vegas Strikers	18	2	12	4	24	52	-28	10

=== Midwest Division ===
Place	Team	P	W	L	T	GF	GA	GD	Points
1	Detroit Arsenal	10	8	0	2	42	5	37	26
2	Milwaukee Bavarians	10	8	1	1	24	6	18	25
3	Princeton 56ers	10	5	5	0	17	20	-3	15
4	Minnesota Blast	10	3	5	2	15	20	-5	11
5	Minnesota TwinStars	10	2	7	1	14	36	-22	7
6	Grand Rapids Alliance	10	1	9	0	10	36	-26	3

== Playoffs ==
=== West Division Playoffs ===
July 23, 2005
5:30 PM PDT

Sacramento Knights	4–0	Salinas Valley Samba
Frazelle 41'; Lucky 57'; Buchanan 64'; Nelle 72'	Report

Hornet Field, Sacramento, California
July 23, 2005
7:30 PM PDT

Sonoma County Sol	2–0	Chico Rooks
Briceno 9'; Sigler 69'	Report

Ernie Nevers Field, Santa Rosa, California

|note= this is to determine who plays in the semifinals

=== Semi finals ===
Sonoma County Sol beat Sacramento Knights
Detroit had a bye

=== Final ===
Detroit Arsenal 1-0 Sonoma County Sol

=== Bracket ===
Semi-Finals
W1	Sacramento Knights	0
W2	Sonoma County Sol	2
M1	Detroit Arsenal	Bye

Championship
W2	Sonoma County Sol	0
M1	Detroit Arsenal	1

==== Semifinals ====
July 29, 2005
6:00 PM PDT
West Division Final

Sacramento Knights	0–2	Sonoma County Sol
		Briceno

Hornet Field, Sacramento, California

==== NPSL Championship Game ====
July 31, 2005
5:00 PM PDT

Sonoma County Sol	0–1 (a.e.t.)	Detroit Arsenal
	Report	Camara 100'

Ernie Nevers Field, Santa Rosa, California
Attendance: 1,000
