= 2003 MPSL season =

Men's Premier Soccer League
- Season: 2003
- Champions: Arizona Sahuaros (1st Title)
- Regular Season Champions: Utah Salt Ratz (1st Title)
- Matches: 45
- Goals: 167 (3.71 per match)
- Top goalscorer: KC Nordfors, Utah; 13 goals
- Highest scoring: Arizona 11, Tucson 0 (July 26)

The 2003 Men's Premier Soccer League season was the inaugural season of the MPSL.

Arizona Sahuaros finished the season as national champions, beating Utah Salt Ratz in the MPSL Championship game

Three of the teams who contested the first season - Arizona Sahuaros, Chico Rooks and Northern Nevada Aces - previously competed in the United Soccer Leagues, but left to form the breakaway MPSL in protest at the way the USL was being run.

== Final standings ==
Purple indicates regular season title clinched
Green indicates playoff berth clinched

Place	Team	P	W	L	T	GF	GA	GD	Points
1	Utah Salt Ratz	15	12	3	0	44	19	+25	36
2	Chico Rooks*	14	11	3	0	34	17	+17	33
3	Arizona Sahuaros	15	8	6	1	30	22	+8	25
4	Northern Nevada Aces	15	4	8	3	20	30	-10	15
5	Tucson Tiburons	15	4	10	1	16	36	-20	13
6	Las Vegas Strikers	15	2	10	3	23	40	-17	9

^{*} Chico Rooks played only 14 league games as they represented the MPSL In the USASA National Cup.

== Playoffs ==
=== Semi-finals ===
August 4, 2003

Chico Rooks	0 - 1	Arizona Sahuaros
	Report	Araujo 87'

University Soccer Stadium, Chico
Chico, California

August 4, 2003

Utah Salt Ratz	9 - 0	Northern Nevada Aces
Nordfors 16', 28', 34'; Huber 42'; Stevenson 55'; Oshay 67' (pen.); Hansen; Callister; Waters	Report

Soaring Eagle Stadium
Draper, Utah

=== Championship ===
August 9, 2003

Utah Salt Ratz	1 - 2 (AET)*	Arizona Sahuaros
Hickman 13'		Coelho 59' 100'

Soaring Eagle Stadium
Draper, Utah
- Overtime Note: 2 ten minute periods with Golden Goal. PK's if still tied.

Semi-Finals
1	Utah Salt Ratz	9
4	Northern Nevada Aces	0
2	Chico Rooks	0
3	Arizona Sahuaros	1

Championship
1	Utah Salt Ratz	1
3	Arizona Sahuaros	2
