= 2004 MPSL season =

Men's Premier Soccer League
- Season: 2004
- Champions: Utah Salt Ratz (1st Title)
- Regular Season Champions: Chico Rooks (1st Title)
- Matches: 79
- Goals: 311 (3.94 per match)
- Top goalscorer: KC Nordfors, Utah; 13 goals

The 2004 Men's Premier Soccer League season was the 2nd season of the MPSL.

Utah Salt Ratz finished the season as national champions, beating Arizona Sahuaros in the MPSL Championship game

== Changes from 2003 ==
=== New Franchises ===
- Five franchises joined the league this year, all expansion franchises:

Team name	Metro area	Location	Previous affiliation
Albuquerque Asylum	Albuquerque area	Albuquerque, NM	expansion
Idaho Wolves	State of Idaho	Idaho Falls, ID	expansion
Sacramento Knights	Sacramento area	Sacramento, CA	expansion
Salinas Valley Samba	Salinas Valley area	Salinas, CA	expansion
Sonoma County Sol	Sonoma County area	Santa Rosa, CA	expansion

=== Folding ===
- One team left the league prior to the beginning of the season:
  - Tucson Tiburons - Tucson, Arizona

== Final standings ==
Purple indicates regular season title clinched
Green indicates playoff berth clinched

Place	Team	P	W	L	T	GF	GA	GD	Points
1	Chico Rooks	16	13	2	1	51	40	11	40
2	Albuquerque Asylum	16	12	4	0	40	16	24	36
3	Arizona Sahuaros	16	11	5	0	27	18	9	33
4	Utah Salt Ratz	16	11	5	0	44	16	28	33
5	Salinas Valley Samba	16	9	6	1	35	21	14	28
6	Sonoma County Sol	16	9	7	0	41	25	16	27
7	Sacramento Knights	15	8	7	0	34	20	14	24
8	Las Vegas Strikers	16	3	13	0	19	39	-20	9
9	Northern Nevada Aces	16	2	14	0	12	71	-59	6
10	Idaho Wolves	15	0	15	0	8	61	-53	0

- the first tiebreaker used was head-to-head results, which explains why Arizona finished ahead of Utah despite having an inferior goal difference and scoring less goals.

== Playoffs ==
=== Semi finals ===
Utah Salt Ratz 1-0 Chico Rooks
Arizona Sahuaros 4-1 Albuquerque Asylum

=== Final ===
Utah Salt Ratz 4-2 Arizona Sahuaros

=== Bracket ===
Semi-Finals
1	Chico Rooks	0
4	Utah Salt Ratz	1
2	Albuquerque Asylum	1
3	Arizona Sahuaros	4

Championship
4	Utah Salt Ratz	4
3	Arizona Sahuaros	2

MPSL Semifinals
July 31, 2004
7:30 PM PDT
Semifinals

Chico Rooks	0–1	Utah Salt Ratz
Simmons (red card) 70'	Report	Acosta 58'; Martinez (red card) 70'

University Soccer Stadium, Chico
Chico, California
July 31, 2004
Semifinals

Albuquerque Asylum	1–4	Arizona Sahuaros
Baca 20'; Gantenbein (yellow card) (yellow-red card) 57'	Report	Urbica; Coelho; Araujo

Lovelace Soccer Complex
Santa Ana Pueblo, New Mexico
Attendance: 1,000
Referee: Ron Baca

MPSL Championship Game
August 8, 2004
5:30 PM MDT

Utah Salt Ratz	4–2	Arizona Sahuaros
Christensen 33', 77'; Acosta 61'; Bowers 85'	Report	Coelho 5' (pen.); Urbica 56'

Soaring Eagle Stadium
Draper, Utah
