= Salinas Valley Samba =

- Full name: Salinas Valley Samba
- Nickname: Samba
- Founded: 2004
- Ground: Watsonville High School
- Chairman: (United States) Cain White
- Manager: (Peru) Mark Cisneros
- League: National Premier Soccer League
- 2009: Regular Season: 6th, Western; Playoffs: did not qualify
Home colors	Away colors

Salinas Valley Samba was an American soccer team based in Salinas, California, United States. Founded in 2004, the team played in the Western Division of the National Premier Soccer League (NPSL), a national amateur league at the fourth tier of the American Soccer Pyramid.

The team spent the majority of its history playing on the campus of Salinas High School, though they moved to Watsonville High School in nearby Santa Cruz County, for their final season in 2009. The team's colors were silver, black and white.

== History ==
The Samba joined the Men's Premier Soccer League in 2004, one of five expansion teams for the league's second season. They were the first soccer based in Salinas that played in a national league since the California Jaguars folded in 2000. They joined along with the Albuquerque Asylum, the Sonoma County Sol, the Sacramento Knights, and the Idaho Wolves. During their first season of play, the Samba finished the league in 5th place, five points behind the Utah Salt Ratz, who ultimately finished the season as league champions.

The 2005 season saw the development of location-specific conferences as more teams were added to the league, which changed its name to the National Premier Soccer League. This placed Salinas Valley in the Western Conference, with a majority of California teams (with the exception of the Las Vegas Strikers and the Albuquerque Asylum). The Samba finished the 2005 season in 4th place. Also in 2005 the Samba advanced to the second round of the Lamar Hunt U.S. Open Cup before being defeated by the Seattle Sounders.

The expansion of the league in 2006 brought further development of the conferences, as the Western Conference split into "Northwestern" and "Southwestern", and a Midwestern conference was added. The Salinas Valley Samba were in the Northwestern Conference of the NPSL from 2006 through 2008. In 2006, they finished the year in 6th place.

== Players ==
=== Last roster ===
as at June 7, 2009 Note: Flags indicate national team as defined under FIFA eligibility rules; some limited exceptions apply. Players may hold more than one non-FIFA nationality.

No.	Pos.	Nation	Player
—	MF	MEX	Jesus Acuña
—		USA	Efrain Banuelos
—		PER	Jorge Becerra
—		PER	Ivan Campos
—		PER	Mario Castillo
—		PER	Joaquin Castilo
—		PER	Israel Cisneros
—		PER	Cesar Garcia
—		PER	Arnufo Gomez
—		PER	Gregory Gonzales
—		PER	Julio Gonzales
—		PER	Peter Gonzales
—		ARG	Ismael Ibarra
—		ARG	Luis Ibarra
—		USA	Nick Lackey
—		ESP	Jaun Marquez
—		PER	Armando Martinez
—		ARG	Aldo Meza

No.	Pos.	Nation	Player
—		USA	Eli Miller
—		USA	Kyle Millerick
—		USA	Reed Mills
—		PER	Pedro Morales
—		PER	Noe Oliva
—		PER	Eduardo Ortiz
—		PER	Said Ortiz
—		PER	Alex Pacheco
—		PER	Roberto Perez
—		USA	Patrick Rickards
—		PER	Juan Rivas
—		PER	Jaime Rubio
—		USA	Kyle Satow
—		PER	Luis Serrano
—		PER	Diego Soto
—		PER	Edwin Soto
—		PER	Jose Tostado
—		PER	Nick Vargas
—		PER	Jose Vega

=== Notable former players ===
- (United States) David Estrada
- (United States) Yuri Morales
- (United States) Nate Northup
- (Liberia) Adam Smarte

== Year-by-year ==
Year	Division	League	Reg. season	Playoffs	Open Cup
2004	4	MPSL	5th	Did not qualify	Did not qualify
2005	4	NPSL	4th, Western	Did not qualify	Second Round
2006	4	NPSL	6th, Northwest	Did not qualify	Did not qualify
2007	4	NPSL	4th, Northwest	Did not qualify	Did not qualify
2008	4	NPSL	4th, Northwest	Did not qualify	Did not qualify
2009	4	NPSL	6th, Western	Did not qualify	Did not enter

== Head coaches ==
- (United States) Artie Cairel (2004–2008)
- (United States) Mark Cisneros (2009)

== Stadia ==
- "The Pit" at Salinas High School; Salinas, California (2004–2008)
- Stadium at Watsonville High School; Watsonville, California (2009)
