= Colorado Rush =

Colorado Rush may refer to:

- Colorado Rush, a youth and adult soccer club based in Littleton, Colorado and owned by Rush Soccer
  - Flatirons Rush SC, a semi-professional soccer team formerly known as the Colorado Rush SC that competes in USL League Two and was formerly affiliated with Colorado Rush
  - Colorado Rush Women, an amateur soccer team affiliated with Colorado Rush that competed in the USL W-League and Women's Premier Soccer League
- Southern Colorado Stars, an indoor soccer team known as the Colorado Rush until 2008
- Juncus confusus, a species of rush known by the common name Colorado rush

== See also ==
- Colorado Gold Rush
- Rush Soccer
