= Rafael Amaya (soccer) =

Colombian-American soccer defender (born 1967)

Personal information
- Date of birth: September 21, 1967 (age 59)
- Place of birth: Bogotá, Colombia
- Height: 5 ft 10 in (1.78 m)
- Position: Defender

Youth career
- Long Island University

Senior career*
Years	Team	Apps	(Gls)
1991–1995	Colorado Foxes		
1992–1993	Denver Thunder (indoor)	31	(7)
1993–1995	Wichita Wings (indoor)	6	(0)
1996	San Jose Clash	7	(0)
1997	Colorado Rapids	7	(0)
1998–1999	Colorado Comets		
1998–1999	Wichita Wings (indoor)	1	(0)
1999–2000	St. Louis Ambush (indoor)	20	(2)
2008	Colorado Predators (guest)		
2008	Colorado Lightning		

Managerial career
- 2008–2009: Colorado Lightning
- * Club domestic league appearances and goals

Rafael Amaya (born September 21, 1965) is a retired Colombian-American soccer defender who spent two seasons in Major League Soccer, five in the American Professional Soccer League, at least five in the National Professional Soccer League and at least two in the USISL.

== Player ==
Amaya was born in Bogotá, Colombia, and spent his youth in the United States earning 1983 New York City High School Player of the Year recognition. He then attended Long Island University where he majored in business and communications. In 1987 and 1988, he played in the Colombian First Division. In 1991, he joined the expansion Colorado Foxes in the American Professional Soccer League. He would go on to play five seasons with the Foxes. By the time he signed with Colorado, he may have been playing in the National Professional Soccer League. However, records only begin for the 1992–1993 season when he is listed with the Denver Thunder. In 1993, he moved to the Wichita Wings where he would play two three winter indoor seasons. However, he only saw time in six games during those two seasons. On February 7, 1996, the San Jose Clash selected Amaya in the 13th round (128th overall) of the 1996 MLS Inaugural Player Draft. He played seven games for the Clash that year. In January 1997, the Clash traded Amaya and Paul Bravo to the Colorado Rapids for Dominic Kinnear and a second round pick in the 1998 MLS Supplemental Draft. In the spring of 1998, Amaya joined the Colorado Comets in the USISL PDSL. He played for the Comets during 1998 and 1999. In the fall of 1998, he returned to the Wichita Wings for one game during the 1998–1999 NPSL season. However, in the fall of 1999, he signed with the St. Louis Ambush in the NPSL and played twenty games. That was his last full season of professional soccer as a player, but he continues to make the occasional appearance for lower division teams in Colorado. For example, in 2008 he has played for both the Colorado Predators in the fourth division National Premier Soccer League and with the Colorado Lightning in the Professional Arena Soccer League.

== Coach ==
During the early 1990s, Amaya coached at the youth level in Colorado. This included Arvada West High School. In September 2008, the Colorado Lightning of the Professional Arena Soccer League hired Amaya as the team's first coach.

Amaya has also served as member of the BOT (Board of Trustees) of the Colorado State Soccer Association.
