= 2006 NPSL season =

National Premier Soccer League
- Season: 2006
- Champions: Sacramento Knights (1st Title)
- Regular Season Champions: Princeton 56ers (1st Title)

The 2006 National Premier Soccer League season was the 4th season of the NPSL. The season started in May 2006, and ended with the NPSL Championship Game in August 2006.

Sacramento Knights finished the season as national champions, beating Princeton 56ers in the NPSL Championship game

== Changes From 2005 ==
=== New Franchises ===
- Five franchises joined the league this year, all expansion franchises:

Team name	Metro area	Location	Previous affiliation
Denver Kickers	Denver area	Golden, CO	expansion
Phoenix Banat Storm	Phoenix area	Avondale, AZ	expansion
Redwood City Ruckus	San Mateo County area	San Bruno, CA	expansion
San Jose Frogs	San Diego area	Carlsbad, CA	expansion
Southern California Fusion	San Diego area	San Jose, CA	expansion

=== Name Changes ===
- Minnesota Blast changed its name to Minnesota NSC United

== Final standings ==
Purple indicates division title clinched

=== Northwest Division ===
Place	Team	P	W	L	T	GF	GA	GD	Points
1	Sacramento Knights	20	12	3	5				41
2	San Jose Frogs	20	12	4	4				40
3	Sonoma County Sol	20	11	8	1				34
4	Redwood City Ruckus	20	6	12	2				20
5	Chico Rooks	20	5	10	5				20
6	Salinas Valley Samba	20	4	13	3				15

=== Midwest Division ===
Place	Team	P	W	L	T	GF	GA	GD	Points
1	Princeton 56ers	10	8	0	2				26
2	Detroit Arsenal	10	7	2	1				22
3	Minnesota TwinStars	9	4	4	1				13
4	Milwaukee Bavarians	10	4	5	1				13
5	Minnesota NSC United	9	2	7	0				6
6	Grand Rapids Alliance	10	1	8	1				4

=== Southwest Division ===
Place	Team	P	W	L	T	GF	GA	GD	Points
1	Albuquerque Asylum	20	13	5	2				41
2	Southern California Fusion	20	9	7	4				31
3	San Diego Pumitas	20	8	4	8				29
4	Denver Kickers	20	8	7	5				29
5	Phoenix Banat Storm	20	6	12	2				20
6	Las Vegas Strikers	20	3	12	5				14

== Playoffs ==
Sacramento Knights 2 - 0 Princeton 56ers

=== Bracket ===
Semi-Finals
NW	Sacramento Knights
WC	Detroit Arsenal
MW	Princeton 56ers
SW	Albuquerque Asylum

Championship
NW	Sacramento Knights	2
MW	Princeton 56ers	0

West Division Semifinals
July 15, 2006
7:30 PM MDT
Semifinals

Albuquerque Asylum	1–0	San Diego Fusion
Baca 67'	Report

Menaul School
Albuquerque, New Mexico
Attendance: 4,000 estimated
July 15, 2006
7:30 PM PDT
Semifinals

Sacramento Knights	5–1	San Jose Frogs
Nelle 24', 44'; Lupercio 26'; Sims 57'; Ricks-Chambers 60'	Report	Monteith 81'

Cosumnes River College
Sacramento, California
West Division Final
July 22, 2006
7:30 PM MDT

Albuquerque Asylum	2–3	Sacramento Knights
Baca 39' (pen.); Padgett 85'		Nelle 30', 37'; Scammacca 60'

Menaul School
Albuquerque, New Mexico

NPSL Championship Game
July 29, 2006
7:00 PM CDT

Princeton 56ers	0–2	Sacramento Knights
	Report	Chimienti 71'; Renteria 90'

Breese Stevens Field
Madison, Wisconsin
Attendance: 1,351
