= Volunteer Shield =

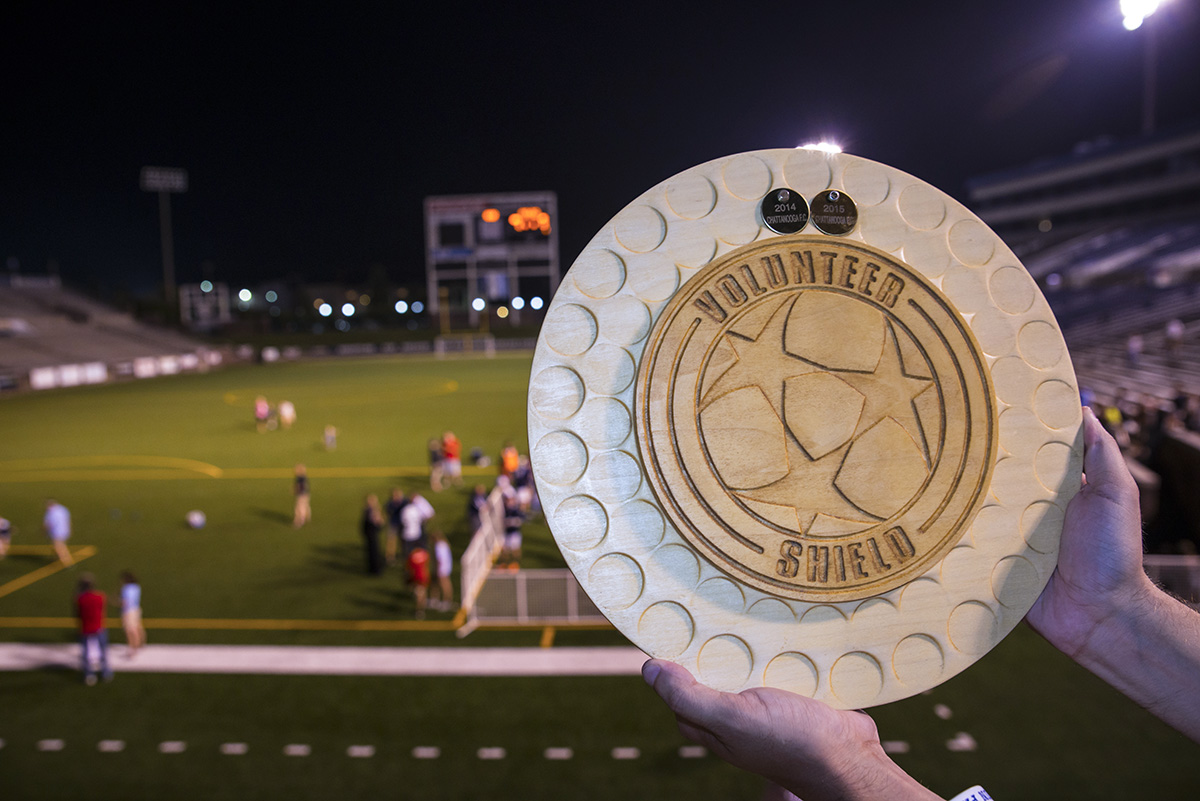
- Volunteer Shield held up at Finley Stadium in Chattanooga, Tennessee after being awarded to Chattanooga FC on July 4, 2015.
- Sport: Soccer
- League: National Premier Soccer League
- Awarded for: Best NPSL team from the state of Tennessee
- Location: Tennessee
- Country: United States

History
- First award: 2015 (Plus retroactive 2014 awarding)
- Editions: 6
- Final award: 2019
- First winner: Chattanooga FC
- Most wins: Chattanooga FC (5)
- Most recent: Chattanooga FC (2019)
- Website: Volunteer Shield Page

The Volunteer Shield was a trophy awarded to the primary supporter group of the Tennessean club in the National Premier Soccer League with the best head-to-head record. It was inaugurated in 2015, and awarded retroactively to Chattanooga FC for the best record during the 2014 season. The shield derives its name from the state's nickname, the "Volunteer State," and is made of Tulip Poplar, the official state tree of Tennessee.

== Teams ==
Originally contested between three teams, at the shield's peak it was contested between four clubs within the NPSL's Southeastern Conference. Chattanooga FC had been the longest standing member of the competition before it left the league following the 2019 season.

As of 2020, only one team in the NPSL (Inter Nashville) is based in the state of Tennessee.

Volunteer Shield Teams
Team Name	First season	No. of Shield Wins	Last NPSL season
Chattanooga FC	2014	5 (2014, 2015, 2016, 2018, 2019)	2019 (to NISA)
Emerald Force SC	2014	1 (2017)	2018 (folded)
Inter Nashville FC	2017	0	N/A
Memphis City FC	2016	0	2017 (to PDL)
Nashville FC	2014	0	2016 (folded)

== Previous results ==
=== 2014 ===
2014 results summary
Team	Pts	Pld	W	L	D	GF	GA	GD
Chattanooga FC	10	4	3	0	1	12	1	+11
Nashville FC	7	4	2	1	1	5	2	+2
Knoxville Force	0	4	0	4	0	2	15	−13

May 10, 2014	Knoxville Force	1–4	Nashville FC	Knoxville, TN
		Report

May 17, 2014	Chattanooga FC	0–0	Nashville FC	Chattanooga, TN
		Report

May 31, 2014	Knoxville Force	0–4	Chattanooga FC	Knoxville, TN
		Report

June 13, 2014	Nashville FC	0–2	Chattanooga FC	Nashville, TN
		Report

June 21, 2014	Chattanooga FC	6–1	Knoxville Force	Chattanooga, TN
		Report

July 4, 2014	Nashville FC	1–0	Knoxville Force	Nashville, TN
		Report

=== 2015 ===
2015 results summary
Team	Pts	Pld	W	L	D	GF	GA	GD
Chattanooga FC	10	4	3	0	1	9	3	+6
Nashville FC	6	4	2	2	0	10	7	+3
Knoxville Force	1	4	0	3	1	6	15	−9

June 9, 2015	Knoxville Force	3–4	Nashville FC	Knoxville, TN
		Report		Stadium: Sansom Sports Complex

June 13, 2015	Knoxville Force	1–1	Chattanooga FC	Knoxville, TN
		Report		Stadium: Sansom Sports Complex

June 20, 2015	Nashville FC	0–2	Chattanooga FC	Nashville, TN
		Report		Stadium: Vanderbilt Stadium

June 27, 2015	Chattanooga FC	4–2	Knoxville Force	Chattanooga, TN
		Report		Stadium: Finley Stadium

July 2, 2015	Nashville FC	6–0	Knoxville Force	Nashville, TN
		Report		Stadium: Vanderbilt Stadium

July 4, 2015	Chattanooga FC	2–0	Nashville FC	Chattanooga, TN
		Report		Stadium: Finley Stadium

=== 2016 ===
2016 results summary
Team	Pts	Pld	W	L	D	GF	GA	GD
Chattanooga FC	16	6	5	0	1	15	3	+12
Memphis City FC	10	6	3	2	1	13	9	+4
Knoxville Force	6	6	2	4	0	8	19	−11
Nashville FC	3	6	1	5	0	5	10	−5

May 21, 2016	Chattanooga FC	2–1	Nashville FC	Chattanooga, TN
19:30 EDT (UTC-04:00)	Samuel Goni 55'; Luke Winter 62'; John Carrier (yellow card) 64'; Liam Guest (yellow card) 67'; Danny Reynolds (yellow card) 90'	CFC Report; NFC Report	Joel Kazhila (yellow card) 32'; Elias Tamburini (yellow card) 50'; Liam Collins (yellow card) 62'; Kyle McLagan (yellow card) 75'; Jordan Wright 86'; Denzel Woods (yellow card) 86'; Alec Velez (yellow card) 90'	Stadium: Finley Stadium; Attendance: 5,593

May 28, 2016	Nashville FC	0–1	Memphis City FC	Nashville, TN
19:00 CDT (UTC-05:00)	Fazlo Alihodzic (yellow card) 26'; Liam Collins (yellow card) 40'	NFC Report; MCFC Report	Blake Lashlee (yellow card) 82'; Neil Cummings (yellow card) 86'; Cameron Woodfin 89'	Stadium: Vanderbilt Stadium; Attendance: 1,133

June 4, 2016	Knoxville Force	3–2	Nashville FC	Knoxville, TN
19:00 EDT (UTC-04:00)	Dallas Dunn 2'; Ryan Creel 65'; Cameron Schneider 83'	KF Report; NFC Report	Elliot Goodwin 16'; Yuji Callahan 23'	Stadium: Sansom Sports Complex

June 4, 2016	Chattanooga FC	2–1	Memphis City FC	Chattanooga, TN
19:30 EDT (UTC-04:00)	Jon Finlay 6'; William Roberts 31'	CFC Report; MCFC Report	Santiago Moore 16'; Fakhry Kholfan (yellow card) 61'; Luke Parker (yellow card) 83'	Stadium: Finley Stadium; Attendance: 3,464

June 7, 2016	Chattanooga FC	4–0	Knoxville Force	Chattanooga, TN
19:30 EDT (UTC-04:00)	Sindre Welo 47'; John Carter 66'; John Carter 73'; Juan Mendicabal 85'; David Perez (yellow card) 89'	CFC Report; KF Report	Jamie McLellan (yellow card) 65'	Stadium: Finley Stadium

June 12, 2016	Memphis City FC	5–1	Knoxville Force	Memphis, TN
19:00 CDT (UTC-05:00)				Stadium: Mike Rose Soccer Complex

June 16, 2016	Nashville FC	0–2	Chattanooga FC	Nashville, TN
19:00 CDT (UTC-05:00)	Erik Furseth (yellow card) 1'; Kyle McLagan (yellow card) 8'; Nicholas Melville (yellow card) 80'	NFC ReportCFC Report	Luke Winter 36'; Danny Reynolds (yellow card) 38'; Kieran Bywater 46'	Stadium: Vanderbilt Stadium

June 18, 2016	Memphis City FC	1–2	Nashville FC	Memphis, TN
19:00 CDT (UTC-05:00)				Stadium: Mike Rose Soccer Complex

June 25, 2016	Memphis City FC	1–1	Chattanooga FC	Memphis, TN
				Stadium: Mike Rose Soccer Complex

June 25, 2016	Nashville FC	0–1	Knoxville Force	Nashville, TN
				Stadium: Vanderbilt Stadium

July 2, 2016	Knoxville Force	3–4	Memphis City FC	Knoxville, TN
				Stadium: Sansom Sports Complex

July 5, 2016	Knoxville Force	0–4	Chattanooga FC	Knoxville, TN
				Stadium: Sansom Sports Complex

=== 2017 ===
For 2017, the Southeast Conference was split in two with Knoxville Force competing in the East Division while Chattanooga FC, Memphis City FC, and new team Inter Nashville FC all competed in the West Division. To accommodate for this, the shield organizers divided the four teams into two groups:

- Chattanooga vs Inter Nashville
- Memphis City vs Knoxville Force

The results from the two matches within each group would determine who wins that group. Once the two group winners emerge, the points earned in the two regular season matches the group winners played against one another would determine the overall winner. If those points were tied, or if the two group winners didn’t play in the regular season, the first tiebreaker would be the results of a playoff match between the group winners. If the group winners did not meet in the playoffs, then the overall results stand tied between the group winners and both would be listed a co-champions.

Chattanooga and Knoxville both won their groups on tie-breakers but since neither team played one-another in the regular season, the shield champion would be decided by tie-breaker whether that be a in a playoff match between the two sides or PointPerGame average vs other Tennessee teams. In the first playoff round, which Knoxville had a bye in due to winning the East Division, Chattanooga fell to Nashville, 2-1, meaning the Knoxville Force won the shield based on PPG (1.5 to 1.0).

==== Group A ====
2017 Group A
Team	Pts	Pld	W	L	D	GF	GA	GD	SEC P	SEC GD
Chattanooga FC	3	2	1	1	0	3	3	0	22	+21
Inter Nashville FC	3	2	1	1	0	3	3	0	22	+10

Tiebreakers: 1) Goal Diff in the two group matches; 2) Goals Scored in the two group matches; 3) Points earned in Southeast Conference play; 4) Goal Differential in Southeast Conference matches; 5) Coin-flip

June 17, 2017	Chattanooga FC	2–1	Inter Nashville FC	Chattanooga, TN
19:30 EDT (UTC-04:00)	Winter 58'; Whitehall (yellow card) 68' (red card); Reynolds 91'	Report	Chamberlain 45'; Perez (yellow card) 90'; Wilson (yellow card) 90'	Stadium: Finley Stadium

July 1, 2017	Inter Nashville FC	2–1	Chattanooga FC	Antioch, TN
	Cordova 29', (yellow card) 66'; Gomez 56'; Dunleavy (yellow card) 73'	Report	Whitehall 42', (yellow card) 71'; Aldred (yellow card) 69'; Bywater (yellow card) 90'	Stadium: International Indoor Soccer Complex

==== Group B ====
2017 Group B
Team	Pts	Pld	W	L	D	GF	GA	GD
Knoxville Force	3	2	1	1	0	4	3	+1
Memphis City FC	3	2	1	1	0	3	4	-1

Tiebreakers: 1) Goal Diff in the two group matches; 2) Goals Scored in the two group matches; 3) Points earned in Southeast Conference play; 4) Goal Differential in Southeast Conference matches; 5) Coin-flip

June 10, 2017	Knoxville Force	3–1	Memphis City FC	Knoxville, TN
19:30 EDT (UTC-04:00)	Avgousti (yellow card) 25'; Tim Baker 40'; Kelynack 51'; Taylor (yellow card) 53'; Pickering (yellow card) 70'; Bamba 87'; Foster (yellow card) 90'; Schneider (yellow card) 90'	Report	Jones (yellow card) 69'; Wadda 76'	Stadium: Sansom Sports Complex

July 8, 2017	Memphis City FC	2–1	Knoxville Force	Memphis, TN
19:00 EDT	Steele 32'; Wadda 44'; Moreto (yellow card) 90'	Report	Fernandez (yellow card) 32'; Pickering 74'	Stadium: Christian Brothers High School

==== Other 2017 matches between Tennessee teams ====
May 20, 2017	Inter Nashville FC	3–0	Memphis City FC	Antioch, TN
19:30 EDT (UTC-04:00)	Kholfan (yellow card) 27'; Medina 46'; Reichenberger 51'; Narke 77'	Report		Stadium: International Indoor Soccer Complex

May 24, 2017	Memphis City FC	0–0	Chattanooga FC	Memphis, TN
19:00 EDT	Nishi (yellow card) 38'; Jones (yellow card) 76'	Report	Yuhaschek (yellow card) 18'; Carrier (yellow card) 79'; Bywater (yellow card) 88'	Stadium: Christian Brothers High School

May 27, 2017	Memphis City FC	0–0	Inter Nashville FC	Memphis, TN
	Nishi (yellow card) 36'	Report	Chamberlain (yellow card) 68'	Stadium: Christian Brothers High School

June 28, 2017	Chattanooga FC	1–2	Memphis City FC	Chattanooga, TN
	Antonio 16'; De Smedt (yellow card) 67'	Report	Nishi 33'; Demba (yellow card) 55'; Jones 67'; Hyman (yellow card) 82'	Stadium: Finley Stadium; Attendance: 3,854

=== 2018 ===
2018 results summary
Team	Pts	Pld	W	L	D	GF	GA	GD
Chattanooga FC	12	4	4	0	0	10	1	+9
Inter Nashville FC	6	4	2	2	0	7	7	0
Emerald Force SC	0	4	0	4	0	5	14	-9

May 19, 2018	Chattanooga FC	2–0	Emerald Force SC	Chattanooga, TN
19:30 EDT (UTC-04:00)	Valenciano 62'; Clarke 78'	Report	Zaczyk (yellow card) 42'; Rodriguez (yellow card) 90'	Stadium: Finley Stadium

May 26, 2018	Emerald Force SC	1–2	Inter Nashville FC	Knoxville, TN
19:00 EDT	Garuba 44', (yellow card) 56'; Altman (yellow card) 76'; Volny (yellow card) 90'	Report	de Jesus (yellow card) 44'; Redmond (yellow card) 49'; Emerald Force Soccer Club 61' (o.g.); Sakou (yellow card) 63', (goal) 73'; Sassano (yellow card) 79'	Stadium: Sansom Sports Complex

May 30, 2018	Emerald Force SC	1–5	Chattanooga FC	Knoxville, TN
19:00 EDT	Barlow (yellow card) 32'; Hellmann 34'; Zapata (yellow card) 64'	Report	Costa 3'; Clarke 11'; Mendizabal 22'; Oliveira 47'; Valenciano 65'	Stadium: Sansom Sports Complex

June 2, 2018	Inter Nashville FC	5–3	Emerald Force SC	Antioch, TN
19:00 EDT	Collins (yellow card) 11'; Dunleavy 22'; Sakou 26, 66'; Simon (yellow card) 48'; Taylor 72'; Reichenberger 73'	Report	Barlow 8', (yellow card) 50' (yellow-red card) 75'; Zapata (red card) 30'; Garuba 42', (yellow card) 73'; Alvarez 81'	Stadium: International Indoor Soccer Complex

June 13, 2018	Inter Nashville FC	0–2	Chattanooga FC	Antioch, TN
19:00 EDT	Sakou (yellow card) 2'; Taylor (yellow card) 61' (yellow-red card) 63'	Report	Valenciano 42'; Ferraz 89'	Stadium: International Indoor Soccer Complex

July 4, 2018	Chattanooga FC	1–0	Inter Nashville FC	Chattanooga, TN
19:30 EDT (UTC-04:00)	Oliveira 66'	Report		Stadium: Finley Stadium

=== 2019 ===
2019 results summary
Team	Pts	Pld	W	L	D	GF	GA	GD
Chattanooga FC	6	2	2	0	0	9	1	+8
Inter Nashville FC	0	2	0	2	0	1	9	-8

June 8, 2018	Chattanooga FC	4–0	Inter Nashville FC	Chattanooga, TN
19:30 EDT (UTC-04:00)	Ferraz 20, 50'; Mendizabal (yellow card) 84'; Wilschrey (yellow card) 86'; Oliveira (yellow card) 89'	Report	Brookes (yellow card) 60'	Stadium: Finley Stadium

July 3, 2019	Inter Nashville FC	1–5	Chattanooga FC	Antioch, TN
19:30 EDT	Moreland (yellow card) 39'; Silva 48'	Report	Dustan 4'; Walsh 33'; Ferraz 43'; Webb 47'; De Lima 51'	Stadium: International Indoor Soccer Complex

== See also ==
- Cascadia Cup a three-team rivalry for MLS teams in the Pacific Northwest
- Southern Derby a multi-team rivalry for soccer clubs in the South Atlantic states
