= Adam Smarte =

Liberian footballer (born 1987)

Personal information
- Full name: Adam Smarte
- Date of birth: 9 May 1987 (age 39)
- Place of birth: Monrovia, Liberia
- Height: 5 ft 11 in (1.80 m)
- Positions: Forward; defender

Youth career
- 2003–2007: UC Santa Cruz Banana Slugs

Senior career*
Years	Team	Apps	(Gls)
2005	Salinas Valley Samba		
2006	San Jose Frogs		
2008	San Jose Earthquakes	3	(0)
2009–2010	Ventura County Fusion	15	(0)
- * Club domestic league appearances and goals as of 24 August 2009

Adam Smarte (born 9 May 1987) is a Liberian former footballer who last played for Ventura County Fusion in the USL Premier Development League.

== Career ==
=== College and amateur ===
Smarte grew up in Elk Grove, California, played college soccer at UC Santa Cruz from 2003 to 2007, and played for both Salinas Valley Samba and the San Jose Frogs in the National Premier Soccer League.

=== Professional ===
Smarte was drafted with the first overall pick in the 2008 MLS Supplemental Draft by the San Jose Earthquakes.

He was released by the Earthquakes at the end of 2008, having played just 3 games for the team, and subsequently signed for Ventura County Fusion of the USL Premier Development League for the 2009 season, where he appeared as a right-back in the defence instead of his usual forward role. He also went on trial with Major League Soccer side D.C. United in August 2009.

== Personal life ==
He founded the apparel brand Modern Pharaoh in 2013.

== Honors ==
Ventura County Fusion

- USL Premier Development League: 2009
