= Northup =

Northup is a surname. Notable people with the surname include:

- Amos Northup (1889–1937), American automotive designer
- Anne Northup (born 1948), American politician
- Diana Northup, American biologist
- James M. Northup (1820–1899), New York politician
- Jeremiah Northup (1816–1879), Canadian merchant, shipowner, and politician
- Jeremiah Northup (Nova Scotia politician) (died 1809), Nova Scotia politician
- Harry Northup (born 1940), American actor and poet
- Nancy Northup (born 1960), American political activist
- Nate Northup (born 1981), American soccer player
- Oliver Northup (1925–2013), American lawyer and murder victim
- Solomon Northup (1808–1863), American farmer, violinist and author
- Stephen Northup (circa 1630–after 1687), early settler of the Colony of Rhode Island and Providence Plantations
- Willard C. Northup (1882–1942), American architect

== See also ==
- Anson Northup, a sternwheel riverboat named for her captain
- Northup, Ohio, an unincorporated community founded by John S. Northup in Gallia County, Ohio, United States
- Northup Trail, a Louisiana Scenic Byway
