= Detroit Arsenal =

Detroit Arsenal may refer to:

- Detroit Arsenal (Dearborn), a 19th-century arsenal in Dearborn, Michigan, United States
- Detroit Arsenal (soccer), a defunct American soccer team
- Detroit Arsenal Tank Plant, a 20th-century factory in Warren, Michigan, United States
