= David Estrada (soccer) =

Mexican footballer (born 1988)

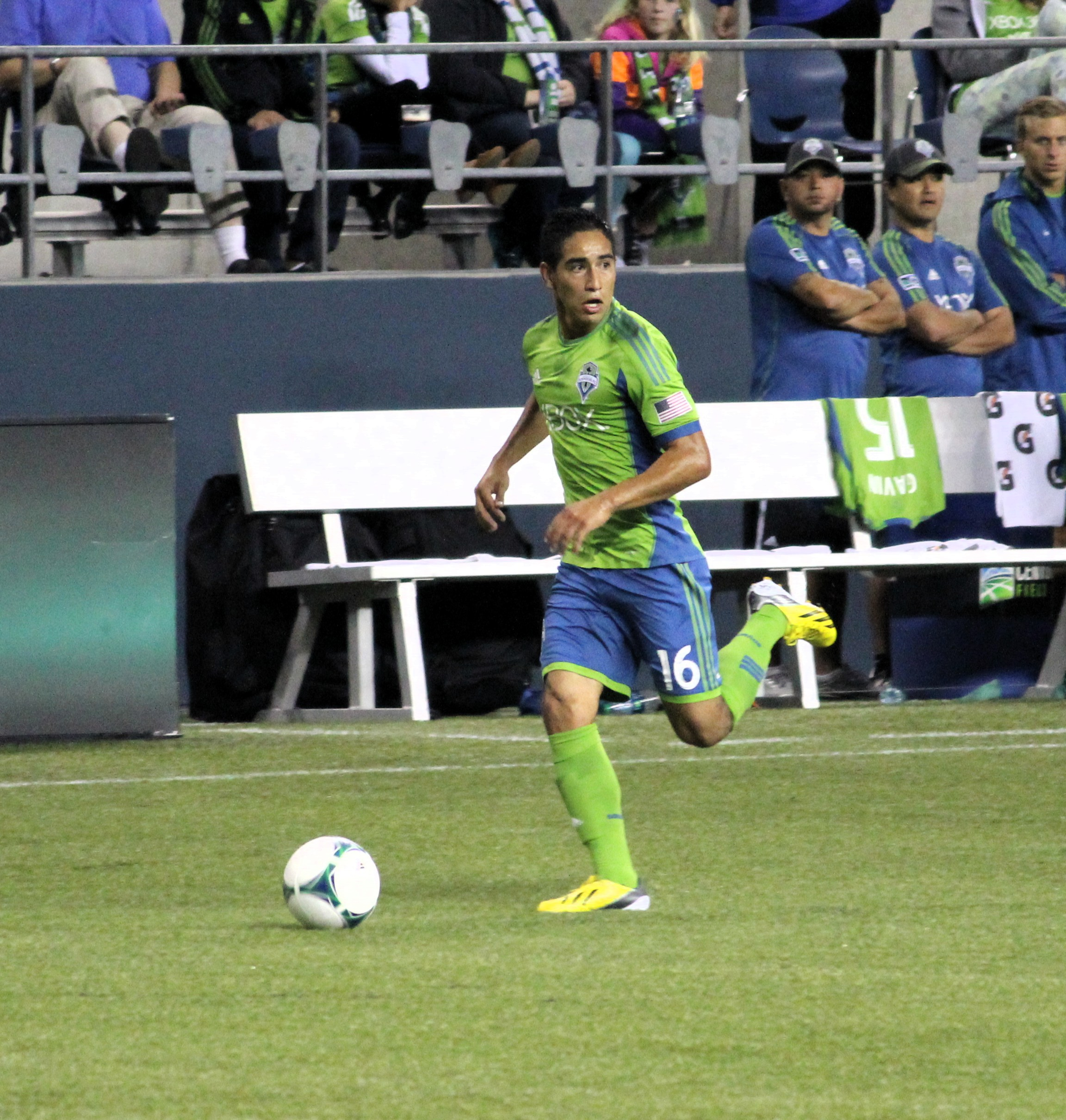
- Estrada with Seattle Sounders FC in 2013

Personal information
- Full name: David Estrada
- Date of birth: February 4, 1988 (age 38)
- Place of birth: Morelia, Michoacán, Mexico
- Height: 1.74 m (5 ft 9 in)
- Position: Forward

College career
Years	Team	Apps	(Gls)
2006–2009	UCLA Bruins	78	(22)

Senior career*
Years	Team	Apps	(Gls)
2006–2009	Salinas Valley Samba		
2010–2014	Seattle Sounders FC	41	(5)
2014	→ Atlanta Silverbacks (loan)	3	(0)
2014	→ Charlotte Eagles (loan)	3	(1)
2014	D.C. United	9	(0)
2015	Sacramento Republic	18	(3)
2015	Orange County Blues	7	(0)
2016–2017	Charlotte Independence	61	(11)
2018	Seattle Sounders FC 2	33	(11)
2019–2020	New Mexico United	42	(3)

Managerial career
- 2026–: New Mexico United (assistant)
- * Club domestic league appearances and goals as of October 5, 2020

David Estrada (born February 4, 1988) is a Mexican former footballer who played as a forward.

== Early life and amateur ==
Estrada was born in Morelia, Michoacán, Mexico and moved to California with his family at four months old. He was raised in Salinas, California and attended Alisal High School. A successful player at the high school level, Estrada led the nation his senior season with 66 goals, including 12 in one game on January 11, 2006, versus Monte Vista Christian (Watsonville, CA)—the second-most single-game goals in state history.

He played four years of college soccer at UCLA. As a walk-on his freshman year, he was the team's top scorer, was named Soccer America's National Freshman of the Year, was a second-team All-Pac-10 selection and was voted UCLA's Offensive MVP. After missing the first seven matches of his sophomore year because of a fractured foot, he was again named to the All-Pac-10 second-team in 2007. He received All-Pac-10 honors for the third time in his career, being named to the honorable mention team in 2008, and earned third-team NSCAA All-Far West honors and first-team All-Pac-10 acclaim in his senior year. In his senior season, Estrada recorded three goals and seven assists playing a wide right midfield position.

During his college years Estrada also played four seasons with Salinas Valley Samba in the National Premier Soccer League.

== Career ==
=== Professional ===
Estrada was drafted in the first round (11th overall) of the 2010 MLS SuperDraft by Seattle Sounders FC. He made his professional debut on April 3, 2010, coming on as a substitute in a game against the New York Red Bulls.

On March 17, 2012, Estrada started in the Sounders first match of the season, and recorded his first three professional goals, scoring a hat trick.

Estrada was traded to D.C. United on August 7, 2014, in exchange for a third-round pick in the 2017 MLS SuperDraft.

Estrada was cut by D.C. United in February 2015, going on trial with Tippeligaen side Stabæk.

On March 20, 2015, Estrada signed for the Sacramento Republic. On August 10, Estrada was released by Sacramento.

After a spell with Orange County Blues FC, Estrada moved to USL side Charlotte Independence on February 3, 2016.

On March 14, 2018, Estrada signed with Seattle Sounders FC 2 as a player and as an assistant coach with the Sounders FC Academy.

On December 18, 2018, Estrada signed with New Mexico United. Estrada won Humanitarian of the Year with New Mexico United in November 2019.

=== International ===
Estrada was called up for a U.S. Under-18 national team camp in January 2007, but has not yet played internationally for any country.

== Coaching career ==
Estrada was named the Head Coach of New Mexico United's Academy on February 8, 2024.

== Career statistics ==
Club performance			League		Cup		League Cup		Continental		Total	
Season	Club	League	Apps	Goals	Apps	Goals	Apps	Goals	Apps	Goals	Apps	Goals
USA			League		Open Cup		League Cup		North America		Total	
2010	Seattle Sounders FC	Major League Soccer	3	0	1	0	0	0	4	0	8	0
2011	Seattle Sounders FC	Major League Soccer	3	0	1	0	0	0	1	0	5	0
2012	Seattle Sounders FC	Major League Soccer	17	5	2	0	3	0	3	2	25	7
2013	Seattle Sounders FC	Major League Soccer	17	0	1	0	0	0	0	0	18	0
2014	Seattle Sounders FC	Major League Soccer	1	0	0	0	—		—		1	0
2014	Atlanta Silverbacks (loan)	North American Soccer League	3	0	—		—		—		3	0
2014	Charlotte Eagles (loan)	USL Championship	0	0	—		—		—		0	0
2014	D.C. United	Major League Soccer	9	0	—		1	0	4	0	14	0
2015	D.C. United	Major League Soccer	0	0	—		—		0	0	0	0
2015	Sacramento Republic FC	USL Championship	18	3	1	0	—		—		19	3
2015	Orange County Blues FC	USL Championship	7	0	—		1	0	—		8	0
2016	Charlotte Independence	USL Championship	30	5	1	0	1	0	—		32	5
2017	Charlotte Independence	USL Championship	31	5	1	0	0	0	—		32	5
2018	Seattle Sounders FC 2	USL Championship	33	11	—		—		—		33	11
2019	New Mexico United	USL Championship	30	2	1	0	1	0	—		30	2
2020	New Mexico United		5	1	0	0	0	—		15	1	
Total	USA		172	29	8	0	6	0	12	2	243	31
Career total			172	29	8	0	6	0	12	2	243	34

== Honours ==
=== Seattle Sounders FC ===
- Lamar Hunt U.S. Open Cup (2): 2010, 2011
