= Colorado Predators =

American soccer team

- Full name: Colorado Predators
- Nickname: The Predators
- Founded: 2007
- Dissolved: 2008
- Ground: Parker Fieldhouse
- Capacity: 1500
- League: Premier Arena Soccer League
- 2007 – Winter: PASL – Rocky Mountains Conference: 1st
Home colors	Away colors

The Colorado Predators were an American soccer team, founded in 2007.

The indoor team was a member of the Premier Arena Soccer League (PASL), the development league for the Professional Arena Soccer League (PASL-Pro), and played in the Rocky Mountain Conference against teams from Albuquerque NM, Rio Rancho NM, Colorado Springs CO, Windsor CO, Golden CO, and Fort Collins CO. In the Winter 2007/2008 season the Predators finished in 1st place in their conference. In the Summer 2008 season, the Predators again ended the season in 1st place in the Rocky Mountain Conference.

The Predators also had an outdoor team which, in 2008, was a provisional member of the National Premier Soccer League (NPSL) the fourth tier of the American Soccer Pyramid.

They played their home matches at the Parker Fieldhouse in the city of Parker, Colorado. The indoor team's colors were red, black, white and gold.

== Year-by-year ==
Year	Win	Loss	Tie	Points	League	Conference	Reg. season	Playoffs
2007 - Winter	9	0	0	24	PASL	Rocky Mountains	1st Place	Lost Conference Championship
2008 - Summer	7	1	0	21	PASL	Rocky Mountains	1st Place	Did not participate
Totals	16	1	0					

== Playoff Record ==
Year	Win	Loss	Tie	GF	GA	GD	
2007 - Winter	0	1	0	10 (5)	12 (6)	2 (1)	*Multi-Point Scoring System
2008 - Summer	N/A	N/A	N/A	N/A	N/A	N/A	
Total	0	1	0	5	6	1	
