= Nashville FC =

- Full name: Nashville Football Club
- Founded: 2013
- Dissolved: 2016
- Ground: Vanderbilt Stadium; Nashville, Tennessee
- Capacity: 40,550
- President: Chris Jones
- Coach: Kyle Roelke
- League: NPSL – South Region; Southeast Conference
- 2016: 5th, Southeast Conference; Playoffs: Did not qualify
Home colors	Away colors

Nashville Football Club was a soccer organization based in Nashville, Tennessee. Founded in 2013, the team played in the National Premier Soccer League (NPSL), a national amateur league at the fourth tier of the American Soccer Pyramid, in the Southeast Conference. The club disbanded after the 2016 season.

== History ==
Nashville FC was founded by a supporters group that intended to form a team as a fan owned group. Club president Chris Jones cited existing fan-owned clubs as inspiration for NFC's foundation, in particular English club F.C. United of Manchester. In February 2014, the two groups merged to form a single club for the 2014 NPSL season. The club had two teams participating in the Middle Tennessee Soccer Alliance, Nashville's largest competitive adult league, and had partnered with the TN State Soccer Association (TSSA), an organization with over 20,000 registered players in the middle Tennessee area alone.

On May 24, 2014, Nashville FC held its first ever home match at Vanderbilt Stadium, defeating the Atlanta Silverbacks Reserves 3–1 in front of a crowd of nearly 2,000 fans.

After a maiden season in which fourth place in the Southeastern Conference garnered the club a playoff spot, Nashville was eliminated at the Conference Semi-final stage by Chattanooga FC, who finished top of the Conference and went on to lose in the Championship match. The club had ambitions of climbing the American Soccer Pyramid, with the reported target an entry into the third-tier United Soccer League (USL) by 2017, and then ascension into the Division II North American Soccer League by 2020. However, in 2016, the United Soccer League awarded a franchise to a separate ownership group in Nashville. Nashville FC subsequently sold its team name, logo, and color scheme to the new USL franchise, which became known as Nashville SC, in exchange for a 1 percent equity stake in the USL team and a voting seat on its board.

The NPSL Nashville FC disbanded after the 2016 season. The city was awarded a new franchise in the league, called Inter Nashville FC.

== Stadium ==
Nashville FC played at Vanderbilt Stadium beginning in 2015 after quickly outgrowing the Vanderbilt Soccer/Lacrosse Complex in their inaugural season.

When the Triple-A Nashville Sounds baseball team announced plans to move to the new First Tennessee Park, Nashville FC stated their aim to reconfigure the Herschel Greer Stadium complex for soccer use, following the previous example of the Portland Timbers' renovation of Providence Park, but in Nashville's case this did not occur.

== Club identity ==
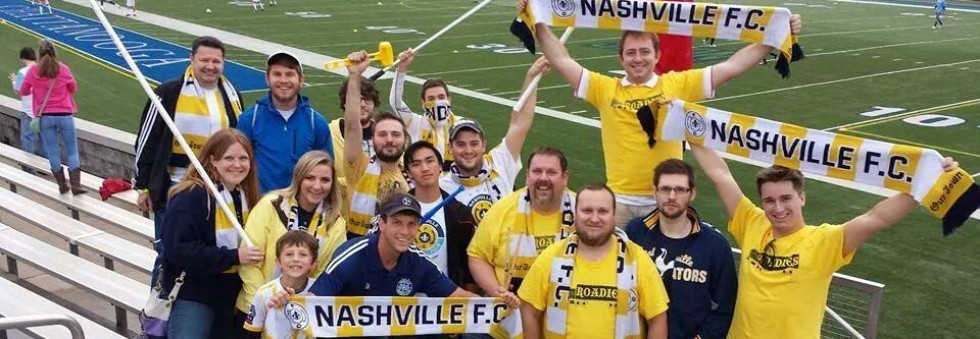
Supporters of Nashville

=== Rivalry ===
Nashville's main rivals were fellow Tennessee club Chattanooga FC, based 135 miles away.

In addition, the four Tennessee clubs in the NPSL (Chattanooga FC, Knoxville Force, Memphis City FC, and Nashville FC) competed for a rivalry trophy called the "Volunteer Shield". The Volunteer Shield was presented at the end of the season to the supporters of the club that took the most points in games against one another, with a medallion added to the trophy commemorating the year.

=== Colors and crest ===
The club's colors were chosen from the Flag of Nashville, Tennessee.

The club's crest was a roundel. The overall shape and formation of the circular "N" along with the small center circle was to represent a spinning record, paying respect to the club's "Music City" heritage. The fleur-di-lis came from the city seal and represents the original French settlers of Nashville. The divide represented the numerous Civil War battles that took place in the area.

== Record ==
=== Year-by-year ===
Year	Division	League	Regular season	Playoffs	Open Cup
2014	4	NPSL	4th, Southeast	Conference Semi-finalists	Did not enter
2015	4	NPSL	4th, Southeast	Conference Semi-finalists	Did not enter
2016	4	NPSL	5th, Southeast	N/A	Did not enter
