= Grand Rapids Alliance =

- Full name: Grand Rapids Alliance
- Founded: 2002
- Dissolved: 2006
- Ground: EGR Memorial Stadium; East Grand Rapids, Michigan
- Chairman: Abrahm Shearer
- Manager: Abrahm Shearer
- League: National Premier Soccer League
Home colours	Away colours

Grand Rapids Alliance were an American soccer team, founded in 2002. The team was a member of the National Premier Soccer League (NPSL), the fourth tier of the American Soccer Pyramid, until 2006, when the team left the league and the franchise was terminated.

The club was part of the larger Alliance FC organization, which ran between 45 and 70 regionally and nationally competitive soccer teams for boys, girls and adults..

The Alliance played their home matches at the EGR Memorial Stadium in the city of East Grand Rapids, Michigan. The team's colors were orange and white.

== Year-by-year ==
Year	Tier	League	Regular season	Playoffs	U.S. Open Cup
2005	4	NPSL	6th of 6, Midwest (1-9-0)	Did not qualify	Did not qualify
2006	4	NPSL	6th of 6, Midwest (1-8-1)	Did not qualify	Did not qualify
