= Jens Bäumer =

German footballer (born 1978)

Personal information
- Date of birth: 9 August 1978 (age 48)
- Place of birth: Münster, West Germany
- Height: 1.76 m (5 ft 9 in)
- Position: Midfielder

Youth career
- TuS Hiltrup
- TSV Schwaigern
- VfR Heilbronn

Senior career*
Years	Team	Apps	(Gls)
1996–1998	Karlsruher SC II		
1997–2000	Karlsruher SC	65	(4)
2000–2003	Borussia M'gladbach	3	(0)
2000–2003	Borussia M'gladbach II	56	(2)
2003–2006	Preußen Münster	101	(7)
2006–2009	Rot Weiss Ahlen	69	(6)
2014	Fredericksburg FC	9	(0)
Total		294	(19)

International career
1998–1999	Germany U-21	5	(0)
1998	Germany Olympic	1	(0)

Managerial career
- 2015–: Fredericksburg FC (assistant)
- * Club domestic league appearances and goals

Jens Bäumer (born 9 August 1978) is a German former professional footballer who played as a midfielder. who presently serves as an assistant coach for Fredericksburg FC in the National Premier Soccer League.
