= Colorado Lightning =

American indoor soccer team

- Full name: Colorado Lightning
- Nickname: The Lightning
- Founded: 2008
- Dissolved: 2009
- Ground: Budweiser Events Center
- Capacity: 7,200
- General Manager: Don Tumminia
- Head Coach: Rafael Amaya
- League: Professional Arena Soccer League
Home colors	Away colors

The Colorado Lightning was an American professional indoor soccer team, founded in 2008.

The team was a charter member of the Professional Arena Soccer League (PASL-Pro), the Second division (at the time of play) of arena (indoor) soccer in North America.

They played their home matches at the Budweiser Events Center in Loveland, Colorado. After a single season, during which the team amassed a 4–12 record, they disbanded.

== Year-by-year ==
Year	Win	Loss	League	Reg. season	Playoffs	Attendance
2008–2009	4	12	PASL-Pro	3rd, Western	Did not qualify	684
Totals	4	12				
