= Nate Northup =

American soccer player and coach

Personal information
- Full name: Nathan J. Northup
- Place of birth: Torrance, California, United States
- Height: 6 ft 0 in (1.83 m)
- Position: Defender

Youth career
- 2000–2003: California State University Monterey Bay

Senior career*
Years	Team	Apps	(Gls)
2005	Salinas Valley Samba		
2006	Boulder Rapids Reserve	12	(1)
2007–2008	Wilmington Hammerheads	20	(1)

Managerial career
- 2009–2011: Cal State Monterey Bay (assistant)
- * Club domestic league appearances and goals

Nate Northup (born Grinnell, Iowa) is an American soccer midfielder who currently coaches for the PVSC Exiles.

== College ==
Northup attended California State University Monterey Bay, playing on the men's soccer team from 2000 to 2003. He graduated cum laude in 2004 with a bachelor's degree in teledramatic arts and technology.

== Professional ==
During his collegiate career, Northup also played as an amateur with the Salinas Valley Samba of the fourth division National Premier Soccer League. Following his graduation from college in 2004, he moved to Europe where he had trials with Tres Cantos Pegaso and Hammarby IF. In 2006, he returned to the U.S. and signed with the Boulder Rapids Reserve of the PDL. A year later, he moved to the Wilmington Hammerheads of the USL Second Division. The Hammerheads released him in 2008.

== Coach ==
Northup was an assistant coach with the California State University, Monterey Bay men's and women's soccer teams.
