= Fredericksburg FC =

- Full name: Fredericksburg Football Club
- Nickname: FFC
- Founded: 1986; 40 years ago
- Ground: UMW Battleground Athletic Complex; Fredericksburg, Virginia
- Capacity: 1,000
- Owner: Grover Gibson Soccer Foundation
- Head coach: Grover Gibson
- League: National Premier Soccer League
- 2016: 1st, Mid-Atlantic Division; Playoffs: Regional First round
- Website: fredericksburgfc.org
Home colors

Fredericksburg FC is an American soccer club based in Fredericksburg, Virginia, United States. Founded in 1986, the team played in the National Premier Soccer League (NPSL), a national amateur league at the fourth tier of the United States soccer league system, in the Mid-Atlantic Division. The women's team played in the Women's Premier Soccer League, a national amateur league at the second tier of the United States soccer league system, in the Colonial Division.

The club played its home games at University of Mary Washington's Battleground Athletic Complex in Fredericksburg, Virginia. The team colors are black, red and white. In 2014, NPSL side RVA Football Club merged with Fredericksburg Area Soccer Association to become Fredericksburg FC.

As of December 2017, Frederick FC was no longer listed as an active team on the NPSL's website, effectively ending the club's semi-professional team. Frederick FC continues to operate as a youth soccer organization for players ages 2 to 19.

== History ==
RVA FC, originally from Richmond, Virginia, enjoyed great success during their first season in the NPSL at Sports Backers Stadium. The team was coached by former American midfielder Grover Gibson, who had a successful club career in Germany. Gibson would lead RVA to a first place finish in the Mid-Atlantic Division with a balanced attacking squad, featuring 29 goals from 10 players during the regular season. The club would advance to the NPSL championship and defeat the Sonoma County Sol 2–0 at Sports Backers Stadium to claim the title and complete an undefeated 10–0–2 season. After the 2013 season, Gibson moved the team to his hometown of Fredericksburg, VA and merged with Fredericksburg Area Soccer Association to become Fredericksburg FC.

In 2014, the team placed third in the Mid-Atlantic Conference with a 5–0–5 record but failed to qualify for the playoffs. 2015 saw the team finish first during the regular season before going out in the regional semifinal. In 2016, the first team finished with a 6-2-2 record and a regional first round appearance. Fredericksburg FC has qualified for the 2016 and 2017 Lamar Hunt US Open Cups.

Year	Division	League	Regular season	Playoffs	US Open Cup
2013	4	NPSL	1st, Mid-Atlantic	Champions	Did not qualify
2014	4	NPSL	3rd, Mid-Atlantic	Did not qualify	Did not qualify
2015	4	NPSL	1st, Mid-Atlantic	Regional semifinal	Did not qualify
2016	4	NPSL	1st, Mid-Atlantic	Regional First round	First round
2017	4	NPSL	3rd, Mid-Atlantic	Conference Semifinal	First round

== Staff ==
=== Head coach ===
- (United States) Grover Gibson (2013–2017)

=== Assistant coaches ===
- (Germany) Jens Baeumer
- (United States) Don Hughes
