= Grover Gibson =

American soccer player

Personal information
- Date of birth: 18 November 1978 (age 47)
- Place of birth: Fairfax, Virginia, United States
- Height: 1.78 m (5 ft 10 in)
- Position: Midfielder

Youth career
- Richmond Strikers
- Braddock Road
- VfB Stuttgart

Senior career*
| Years | Team | Apps | (Gls) |
| 1997–1999 | VfB Stuttgart II | 11 | (0) |
| 1999–2000 | FC Augsburg | 25 | (0) |
| 2000–2002 | SV Elversberg | 31 | (5) |
| 2002–2003 | Mainz 05 | 4 | (0) |
| 2003–2004 | SV Elversberg | 27 | (1) |
| 2004–2005 | Jahn Regensburg | 30 | (2) |
| 2005–2006 | Preußen Münster | 11 | (1) |
| 2006 | Kickers Emden | 8 | (1) |
| 2007 | Preußen Münster | 12 | (2) |
| 2007–2009 | Rot-Weiss Ahlen | 40 | (6) |

Managerial career
- 2013–: Fredericksburg FC
- * Club domestic league appearances and goals

Grover Gibson (born 18 November 1978) is an American soccer player who last played for Rot-Weiss Ahlen in the 2. Bundesliga until retiring due to injury in August 2009.

In 2012, Gibson established the Grover Gibson Soccer Foundation, which is a non-profit corporation, where he founded Fredericksburg FC and is currently head coach.

== Club career ==
Born in Fairfax, Virginia, after graduating from high school, Gibson signed with VfB Stuttgart U-18. He went on to play two years for VfB Stuttgart reserves. After that he played for third-tier sides FC Augsburg and SV Elversberg before signing with 1. FSV Mainz 05 in the 2. Bundesliga at the age of 21. Later he played again in the third tier for SSV Jahn Regensburg, SC Preußen Münster, Kickers Emden. His last club was Rot-Weiss Ahlen in the 2. Bundesliga where he played 30 matches and scored six goals.

His professional career ending after fracturing the eye socket which also damaged the retina and optic nerve.

Gibson previously played four matches in the 2. Bundesliga for 1. FSV Mainz 05.

== Coaching career ==
Following the creation of the Grover Gibson Soccer Foundation, a non-profit corporation promoting soccer, Gibson founded RVA FC (now Fredericksburg FC), as a youth soccer organization in Richmond, Virginia, with the senior men's team to compete in the amateur National Premier Soccer League (NPSL), considered the fourth tier of the American soccer pyramid. Gibson would coach the club in its inaugural season, leading them to a first-place finish in the Mid-Atlantic Division and all the way to the NPSL Championship game against the Sonoma County Sol.

== Personal life ==
Gibson resides currently in Fredericksburg, Virginia with his wife and three children.
