= Memphis City FC =

Defunct association football club in the U.S.

- Full name: Memphis City Football Club
- Short name: Memphis City, MCFC
- Founded: May 27, 2015; 11 years ago
- Dissolved: November 30, 2018; 7 years ago
- League: USL League Two
- 2018: 7th, Deep South Division; Playoffs: DNQ
- Website: www.memphiscityfc.com

Memphis City FC were an American soccer team based in Memphis, Tennessee which played in USL League Two. The team was founded in 2015 and played its inaugural season in 2016 in the National Premier Soccer League. The team competed for a rivalry trophy called the "Volunteer Shield". The four Tennessee teams Memphis City FC, Nashville FC, Chattanooga FC, and Knoxville Force play against one another twice throughout the season. The team with the most points per win/tie, wins the trophy.

== History ==
Memphis City FC was founded on May 27, 2015, with the intention of bringing high-level soccer to the city of Memphis and to advance the cause of Memphis soccer nationally. Following several months of planning and set-up, the club was officially announced to the public on November 4, 2015, when it was revealed that they had won a place in the NPSL for the 2016 season.

== Badge and colors ==
The badge of the club consists of a stylized capitals "MCFC" contained within concentric rings, the club's name written again in full within the rings, and the design topped off with two small Egyptian pyramids which represent the namesake of the club's home city, being Memphis, Egypt. The design bears strong similarities to that of Major League Soccer side New York City FC, with Memphis City's management admitting that NYCFC sister club Manchester City of the Premier League in England influenced the naming of the NPSL team, although the two sides share neither ownership, management nor affiliation.

The colors of the club, in contrast, are similar to the Maroon and Orange of Serie A side A.S. Roma, which the club again cites as a primary influence on the founders, stating that they additionally represent a contrast to the traditional blues and greens of other nearby soccer sides.

The jerseys used by Memphis City FC are supplied by Hummel Sports and the jersey sponsor is Toyota. Their home jersey boasts a maroon base with white accents and the away jersey is white and the I-40 cup boasts a sky blue body and white accents.

== Stadium ==
The club played its home games at Mike Rose Soccer Complex, in a 2,500 capacity stadium on the site, lying a short distance to the east of the city. Toward the end of the 2016 season the team moved to Christian Brothers High School's Tom Nix Stadium. They now play their home games there at 5900 Walnut Grove, seating 3,000.

== Awards 2016 ==
Santiago Moore of Memphis City FC won the 2016 Volunteer Shield Golden Boot. Moore finished the competition for Tennessee's premier club with 5 goals and helped guide MCFC and their MCFC Rogue Squadron to a respectable second place finish in the derby in Memphis' inaugural season.

- Volunteer Golden Boot
- NPSL SE Conference Player of the Week (multiple times)
- Dalton State scholarship offer

Humberto Paelez

- Voted NPSL SE Player of the Week (multiple times)

Jack Skahan

- Youngest player ever (17 yo) to score in the NPSL SE Conference

Cameron Woodfin

- Southern Conference Men's Soccer Player of the Week

Hayden Hamilton (16 Y/O)

- Youngest player to play in NPSL Southeast Conference

== Conference ==
In 2016 MCFC was a part of the SouthEastern Conference. It consisted of 6 teams. Nashville FC, Chattanooga FC, Knoxville Force, New Orleans, Birmingham Hammers, and Memphis City FC. In 2017 the Conference expanded and added 4 more teams and divided the conference into two divisions, the East and West. In the East Asheville City FC, Atlanta Silverbacks, FC Carolina Discoveries, Georgia Revolution, and Knoxville Force. In the West Birmingham Hammers, Chattanooga FC, Inter-Nashville FC, Memphis City FC, and New Orleans Jesters.

== Regular season 2016 record ==
Win Draw Loss (** Represents I-40 CUP) (* Represents Conference Play)

Week	Date	Opponent	Result	Score	Record	Conference record
1	April 22, 2016	at Little Rock Rangers**	L	1–2 agg (1–2)	0–1–0	0-0-0
2	April 24, 2016	Little Rock Rangers**	T	3–3 Agg (4–5)	0–1–1	0-0-0
3	May 7, 2016	@ Mississippi Brilla	L	2–3	0–2–1	0-0-0
4	May 14, 2016	Houston Hurricanes	W	5–0	1–2–1	0-0-0
5	May 21, 2016	New Orleans Jesters*	T	0–0	1–2–2	0–0–1
6	May 28, 2016	Nashville FC*	W	1–0	2–2–2	1–0–1
7	June 4, 2016	@ Chattanooga FC*	L	1–2	2–3–2	1–1–1
8	June 10, 2016	Knoxville Force*	W	5–1	3–3–2	2–1–1
9	June 12, 2016	at Birmingham Hammers*	L	0–1	3–4–2	2–2–1
10	June 16, 2016	@ New Orleans Jesters*	W	2–1	4–4–2	3–2–1
11	June 18, 2016	Nashville FC*	L	1–2	4–5–2	3–3–1
12	June 25, 2016	Chattanooga FC*	T	1–1	4–5–3	3–3–2
13	June 29, 2016	Birmingham Hammers*	W	4–3	5–5–3	4–3–2
14	July 2, 2016	@ Knoxville Force*	W	2–1	6–5–3	5–3–2

== Post-season 2016 ==
Round	Date	Opponent	Result	Score	Record
Conference Semi-final	July 8, 2016	New Orleans Jesters	W	3–0	7–5–3
Conference Final	July 9, 2016	Chattanooga FC	L	1–2	7–6–3

== Regular season 2017 record ==
Win Draw Loss Not Played (~ Represents I-40 CUP) (* Represents Conference Play) (** Represents West Conference Play)

Week	Date	Opponent	Result	Score	Record	Conference record	West record
1	March 22, 2017	vs Portsmouth FC	W	4–3	1–0	0–0	0–0
2	April 15, 2017	vs Freed Hardeman	W	7–1	2–0	0–0	0–0
3	May 14, 2017	@ Little Rock Rangers~	W	2–1 agg (2–1)	3–0	0–0	0–0
4	May 6, 2017	vs Nashville SC	L	1–4	3–1	0–0	0–0
5	May 13, 2017	vs Asheville City FC*	T	2–2	3–1–1	0–0–1	0-0-0
6	May 20, 2017	@ Inter-Nashville FC**	L	0–3	3–2–1	0–1–1	0–1–0
7	May 24, 2017	vs Chattanooga FC**	T	0–0	3–2–2	0–1–2	0–1–1
8	May 27, 2017	vs Inter-Nashville FC**	T	0–0	3–2–3	0–1–3	0–1–2
9	June 3, 2017	vs Little Rock Rangers~	T	1–1 agg (3–2)	3–2–4	0–1–3	0–1–2
10	June 16, 2016	vs Birmingham Hammers**	W	2–0	4–2–4	1–1–3	1–1–2
11	June 8, 2017	@ Asheville City FC*	W	2–1	5–2–4	2–1–3	1–1–2
12	June 10, 2017	@ Knoxville Force*	L	1–3	5–3–4	2–2–3	1–1–2
13	June 17, 2017	vs New Orleans Jesters**	T	1–1	5–3–5	2–2–4	1–1–3
14	June 21, 2017	@ Mississippi Brilla	W	8–1	6–3–5	2–2–4	1–1–3
15	June 24, 2017	@ New Orleans Jesters**	L	2–3	6–4–5	2–3–4	1–2–3
16	June 28, 2017	@ Chattanooga FC**	W	2–1	7–4–5	3–3–4	2–2–3
17	July 1, 2017	@ Birmingham Hammers**	W	1–0	8–4–5	4–3–4	3–2–3
18	July 8, 2017	vs Knoxville Force*	W	2–1	9–4–5	5–3–4	3–2–3

== Year-by-year ==
Year	Division	League	Regular season	Playoffs	Open Cup	I-40 Cup	Volunteer Shield
2016	4	NPSL	2nd, Southeast (5–3–2)	Conference Final	Did not enter	L 4–5	2nd
2017	4	NPSL	6th, Southeast (5–3–4) 4th, West (3–2–3)	Did not qualify	Did not enter	W 3–2	3rd
2018	4	PDL	7th, Deep South (1–10–3)	Did not qualify	Did not qualify	–	–
