= Northern Colorado Cutthroats =

- Full name: Northern Colorado Cutthroats
- Nickname: Cutthroats
- Founded: 2007
- Ground: Arena Sports, LLC
- Capacity: 500
- Owner: Adam Bauer
- Head Coach: Taylor Gallegos
- League: Premier Arena Soccer League
- 2008 - Summer: PASL; Rocky Mountains Conference: 3rd
| Home colors | Away colors |

Northern Colorado Cutthroats are an American soccer team, founded in 2007 by Adam Bauer who is also a Fort Collins Arsenal and Rocky Mountain High School soccer coach. The indoor team is a member of the Premier Arena Soccer League (PASL), the development league for the Professional Arena Soccer League (PASL-Pro), and plays in the Rocky Mountain Conference against teams from Albuquerque, New Mexico (Albuquerque Asylum), Rio Rancho, New Mexico (New Mexico Banditos), Parker, Colorado (Colorado Predators), Colorado Springs, Colorado (Southern Colorado Stars), Golden, Colorado (Golden Stikers), and Fort Collins, Colorado (F.C. Fury & Diablos S.C.).

They play their home matches at the Arena Sports, LLC in the city of Windsor, Colorado. The indoor team's colors are burgundy and white.

== Year-by-year ==
| Year | Win | Loss | Tie | Points | League | Conference | Reg. season | Playoffs |
|---|---|---|---|---|---|---|---|---|
| 2007 - Winter | 2 | 6 | 0 | 6 | PASL | Rocky Mountains | 4th Place | Did not qualify |
| 2008 - Summer | 4 | 4 | 0 | 12 | PASL | Rocky Mountains | 3rd Place | Did not qualify |
| Totals | 6 | 10 | 0 | | | | | |

== Playoff record ==
| Year | Win | Loss | Tie | GF | GA | GD |
|---|---|---|---|---|---|---|
| 2007 - Winter | N/A | N/A | N/A | N/A | N/A | N/A |
| 2008 - Summer | N/A | N/A | N/A | N/A | N/A | N/A |
| Total | N/A | N/A | N/A | N/A | N/A | N/A |
