= Emerald Force SC =

Soccer club in Tennessee, US

Emerald Force Soccer Club
- Full name: Emerald Force Soccer Club
- Nickname: Knoxville Force
- Founded: 2010; 16 years ago
- Dissolved: 2019; 7 years ago
- Stadium: Hackney Field, Sansom Sports Complex; Knoxville, Tennessee
- Capacity: 1,000
- Owner: Emerald Youth Foundation
- General Manager: Derrick Long
- Head Coach: Chad Stocton
- League: National Premier Soccer League
- 2017: 1st, Southeast Conference – Eastern Division; Playoffs: Conference Semi-finalist
- Website: https://www.emeraldforcesc.com/
Home colors	Away colors

Emerald Force Soccer Club, formerly known and nicknamed as the Knoxville Force, was an American soccer club based in Knoxville, Tennessee, United States. Founded in 2010, the senior team was part of the Southeast Conference within the South Region of the National Premier Soccer League (NPSL), the fourth tier of the American Soccer Pyramid. Additionally, the club fielded a Women's team which competed in the Southeast Conference of the Women's Premier Soccer League, several youth teams, and an academy system.

The Force teams trained and played home games at the Sansom Sports Complex in downtown Knoxville. The team's colors were green, white, and yellow.

== History ==
The Knoxville Force began play in the 2011 NPSL season. The team's founding ownership group was Knoxville Soccer, LLC. Barry Goss served as president and majority owner of the team, while his son, Jason Goss, served as the team's general manager.

The Force finished their inaugural season, 5th in the Southeast Conference with, 3 wins, 6 losses, and 1 draw in conference play.

The Force started out the 2012 campaign with a 1–0 win against in-state rival Chattanooga FC, and finished with a 6 wins and 4 losses in conference, good for 2nd in the final conference standings.

The Force finished the 2013 season with only 1 conference win to go along with 4 losses and 5 draws, which led to a 5th-place position in the final Southeast Conference standings.

The 2014 season was the team's worst on-field performance to date. The team finished no wins and only 2 draws, to 8 losses. They finished last place in the conference. Beginning in 2014, Knoxville Force merged their soccer operations with the Emerald Youth Foundation.

Following the 2014 season, Barry Goss and Knoxville Soccer sold the team to the Emerald Youth Foundation, a Christian, urban youth ministry, and serve as the senior team of the Emerald Youth Foundation academy system. The new ownership changed the team's colors from their original orange, navy, and white to the current emerald, black, and white, which better matches their existing academy branding. The new ownership also moved home matches from Regal Stadium to Hackney Field, part of the new Sansom Sports Complex in downtown Knoxville which is operated by the foundation.

The 2015 season saw many positives off the field, with the move to the new Sansom Sports Complex, growth of the academy structure, and the development of the Scruffy City Syndicate supporters group. On the field results were mixed. The men again won no conference games, lost seven, and tied 3. They again placed last in the conference. They did, however, have two wins against the Birmingham Hammers, an expansion team which would be in the Force's conference beginning in 2016. While the men's team's struggles continued, the 2015 season was very positive for the women's side. They were undefeated in the regular season winning 6 games and drawing 1, which made them conference champions. In the playoffs they defeated Chattanooga FC 3–2 in 2nd extra time and defeated the FC Nashville Wolves in a penalty shootout. Their season came to an end in the Regional Championship when their first loss of the season came against Oklahoma City FC.

In 2016 the men's team got a fresh start with new coach Bradley Camp, and a largely new roster. The achieved their first conference win since 2013 by defeating the Birmingham Hammers on May 21, 2016. The Force defeated Nashville FC twice in that team's final NPSL campaign, and ultimately finished 4th in the conference standings to qualify for the playoffs for the first time. The Force lost in the first round of the playoffs to eventual National Semifinalist Chattanooga FC.

In 2017 the team continued to build on their success with new coach Chad Stocton. They had, by most all measures, their most successful year to date, finishing first in their division and securing the Volunteer Shield for the first time, but they fell in the Conference Semi-finals to eventual Conference Champions and National Quarter-finalist Inter Nashville FC.

In January 2019, Emerald Youth Foundation posted a four paragraph statement on the Force's website explaining that while the affiliation with the NPSL and WPSL provided "visibility and credibility" to their soccer programs, the leagues' push to pro soccer did not match the goals of Knoxville's adult teams. As soccer has continued to grow in popularity throughout the United States, so has the number of adults interested in playing the sport, and the philosophy of the NPSL and WPSL has shifted to focus more on national player development and advancing the teams from one league level to the next. Emerald Youth's goal with the adult teams was not to utilize them as a path to a major league soccer team. Instead, the focus was on leadership and character development.”

== Knoxville Force Men's year-by-Year results ==
Year	Division	League	League Record (W-D-L)	Overall Record (W-D-L)	Regular season	Playoffs	Open Cup	Other
2011	4	NPSL	3–1–6	3–1–6	5th, Southeast	Did not qualify	Did not qualify	
2012	4	NPSL	6–0–4	6–0–4	2nd, Southeast-West	Did not qualify	Did not qualify	
2013	4	NPSL	1–5–4	1–5–4	5th, Southeast	Did not qualify	Did not qualify	
2014	4	NPSL	0–2–8	0–2–8	7th, Southeast	Did not qualify	Did not qualify	
2015	4	NPSL	0–3–7	2–3–7	6th, Southeast	Did not qualify	Did not qualify	
2016	4	NPSL	4–0–6	5–0–7	4th, Southeast	Conference Semi-finals	Did not qualify	
2017	4	NPSL	7–2–4	9–2–4	1st, Southeast-East	Conference Semi-finals	Did not qualify	Volunteer Shield Winners
2018	4	NPSL	1–0–3	1–0–3	TBD	TBD	Did not qualify	TBD

== Staff ==
Derek Broadley was appointed head coach of the Force in February 2011. His two assistant coaches were Steven Lyons and Josh Scott.

Beginning with the 2012 season, Broadley was named Director of Coaching for the Force, Steven Lyons was named head coach, and Josh Scott was named assistant.

In 2014 Paulo Neto was named head coach, and served in that role for two seasons. During his time with the Force, Neto also served as the head coach for the Shorter University Hawks Men's Soccer team, Regional Head Coach for Region 2 Olympic Development Program, as well as a Kentucky ODP Head Coach. Neto held a Union of European Football Associations (UEFA) "A” License, a United States Soccer Federation (USSF) "A" License, and a USSF National Youth License. Neto was named head coach of the Saint Francis University men's soccer program in May 2015, and therefore resigned as Force head coach at the conclusion of the 2015 season.

In 2016, Brad Camp was named the fourth head coach of the Knoxville Force.

In 2017, former assistant coach Chad Stocton was named the fifth head coach of the Knoxville Force.

Jason Goss, served as the first general manager for the Force from 2011 to 2014. Beginning in 2015 Derrick Long is general manager for the Force as well as the Emerald Force Soccer Club Academy and Club Leagues.

2011 (England) Derek Broadley

2012–2013 (England) Steven Lyons

2014–2015 (Brazil) Paulo Neto

2016 (United States) Brad Camp

2017–present (United States) Chad Stocton

== Stadiums ==
- Hackney Field, Sansom Sports Complex; Knoxville, Tennessee (2015–present)
- Regal Stadium; Knoxville, Tennessee (2011–2014)

The Force play their games at Hackney Field, part of the Sansom Sports Complex. The Sansom Sports Complex was built on a 14-acre site once occupied by an H.T. Hackney warehouse. Bill Sansom, CEO of Knoxville-based H.T. Hackney, developed the downtown sports complex. Emerald Youth Foundation oversees and operates the complex. The first field, pavilion and field house opened for practice in spring 2015. When complete, the unique complex will include three synthetic turf fields, a pavilion covered turf field, and a 5,000 square foot field house with a performance-training center. Baseline Sports Construction of Knoxville is the builder.

== Supporters ==
The Supporters Group of the Knoxville Force is the Scruffy City Syndicate. The Syndicate was founded in 2015.

== Rivalries ==
The Tennessee clubs in the NPSL compete for a rivalry trophy called the "Volunteer Shield". The Volunteer Shield is presented at the end of the season to the supporters of the club that took the most points in games against one another, with a medallion added to the trophy commemorating the year.

The teams which currently compete for the Volunteer Shield are Knoxville Force, Chattanooga FC, and Inter Nashville FC.

== Broadcast and media ==
For their premier season of 2011, the Knoxville Force entered into an agreement with ESPN Radio Knoxville to broadcast the team's home games. Games are carried live on AM 1180 in Knoxville and within the AM 1180 coverage area. The broadcast team for the 2011 season consists of Mark Atnip and Jon Haynes. Atnip has been serving as the broadcaster for the Knoxville Icebears Professional Hockey Team (SPHL) since 2004. Jon Haynes joined the Icebears broadcast team during the 2009–2010 season, and serves as a public address announcer for the Tennessee Smokies baseball team. (AA affiliate of the Chicago Cubs)

== Knoxville Force Women ==
The Force organization also fields a women's team in the Women's Premier Soccer League (WPSL). The team was founded in 2012, and were initially known as the Knoxville Lady Force until the team was purchased by the Emerald Youth Foundation prior to the 2015 season.

Under the new ownership in 2015, the women's team had their best season yet, going undefeated in the regular season and winning the Southeast Conference regular and postseason titles, and advancing to the Southern Region Finals, where they lost to Oklahoma City FC.

== Knoxville Force Women year-by-year results ==
Year	League	Regular season	Playoffs
2012	WPSL	2nd, Southeast	Regional Semi-finals
2013	WPSL	3rd, Southeast	Conference Semi-finals
2014	WPSL	4th, Southeast	Conference Semi-finals
2015	WPSL	1st, Southeast	Conference Champions, Regional Finals
2016	WPSL	5th, Southeast	Conference Champions
2017	WPSL	5th, Southeast	Did not qualify

== Emerald Force Soccer Club ==
The youth club of the Knoxville Force is the Emerald Force Soccer Club, an inner city youth club, affiliated with the Emerald Youth Foundation, that aims to provide ample opportunities for inner city youth to play and excel in the sport of soccer. The Emerald Force Soccer Club consists of an academy league as well as competitive teams.
