= Detroit Arsenal (soccer) =

- Full name: Detroit Arsenal Soccer Club
- Nickname: Arsenal
- Founded: 1997
- Dissolved: 2006
- Ground: Hurley Field; Berkley, Michigan, U.S.
- Capacity: 10,000
- Manager: Waad Sana
- League: National Premier Soccer League
- 2006: 2nd, Midwest Conference; Playoffs: DNQ
Home colors	Away colors

Detroit Arsenal was an American soccer team, founded in 1997. The club initially played under the USASA and won the National Championship title in 1999 and 2000, prior to joining the Midwest Conference of the National Premier Soccer League (NPSL), the fourth tier of the American soccer pyramid, in 2005.

The Arsenal played their home matches at Hurley Field on the grounds of Berkley High School in the city of Berkley, Michigan, 17 miles (27 km) north of downtown Detroit. The team's colors were black, silver and white.

The Arsenal were NPSL champions in 2005, their first year in the competition following the league's expansion into the Midwest.

Following the 2006 NPSL season, the team's management announced that they would spend the 2007 season on hiatus. The team never returned.

== History ==
Detroit Arsenal joined the National Premier Soccer League (NPSL), considered the fourth tier of the American soccer pyramid and roughly equal to the USL Premier Development League (PDL), for the 2005 season alongside seven other clubs as part of the league's expansion into the American Midwest.

The Arsenal would have a very successful first season, going undefeated in the regular season with a record of 8 wins, 0 losses and 2 draws, with a league-leading 42 goals for and only 5 against. The club would advance to the play-off finals, defeating the Sonoma County Sol to win the NPSL Championship 1-0.

In their second season in 2006, the Arsenal finished in 2nd in the Midwest Conference with a record of 7–2–1. The club folded in the off season.

== Year-by-year ==
Year	Division	League	Reg. season	Playoffs	Open Cup
2005	4	NPSL	1st, Midwest	Champions	Did not qualify
2006	4	NPSL	2nd, Midwest	Did not qualify	Did not qualify

== Honors ==
- NPSL Champions 2005
- NPSL Midwest Division Champions 2005
