= Southern Colorado Stars =

- Full name: Southern Colorado Stars
- Nickname: SoCo Stars
- Founded: 2007
- Ground: Colorado Sports Center
- Capacity: 500
- Manager: Peter Randall
- League: Premier Arena Soccer League
- 2008 - Summer: PASL; Rocky Mountains Conference: 2nd
Home colors	Away colors

Southern Colorado Stars are an American soccer team, founded in 2007. The indoor team is a member of the Premier Arena Soccer League (PASL), the development league for the Professional Arena Soccer League (PASL-Pro), and plays in the Rocky Mountain Conference against teams from Albuquerque NM, Rio Rancho NM, Parker CO, Windsor CO, Golden CO, and Fort Collins CO. The SoCo Stars have been previously known as the Pikes Peak Stars and the Colorado Rush before the beginning of the Summer 2008 season.

They play their home matches at the Colorado Sports Center in the city of Monument, Colorado. The indoor team's colors also are red and white.

== Year-by-year ==
Year	Win	Loss	Tie	Points	League	Conference	Reg. season	Playoffs
2007 - Winter	5	3	0	15	PASL	Rocky Mountains	3rd Place	Did not qualify
2008 - Summer	6	2	0	18	PASL	Rocky Mountains	2nd Place	Lost National Semi-Final
Totals	11	5	0					

== Playoff Record ==
Year	Win	Loss	Tie	GF	GA	GD
2007 - Winter	N/A	N/A	N/A	N/A	N/A	N/A
2008 - Summer	2	1	1	21	14	7
Total	2	1	1	21	14	7
