= Tucson Tiburons =

Football club (2003 to 2004)

- Full name: Tucson Tiburons
- Nickname(s): The Tiburons
- Founded: 2003
- Dissolved: 2004
- Ground: Mountain View High School
- Manager: Matthew Norman
- League: National Premier Soccer League
- 2003: 5th, did not make playoffs

Tucson Tiburons were an American soccer team, founded in 2003. The team was a member of the Men's Premier Soccer League (later renamed the National Premier Soccer League), the fourth tier of the American Soccer Pyramid, for just one season, after which the team folded.

They played their home games in the stadium at Mountain View High School in Tucson, Arizona.

== Year-by-year ==
Year	Division	League	Regular season	Playoffs	Open Cup
2003	4	MPSL	5th	Did not qualify	Did not qualify
