= NSC United =

- Full name: Minnesota NSC United
- Manager: Alan Merrick
- League: National Premier Soccer League
- 2006: 5th, did not qualify for playoffs
Home colours	Away colours

Minnesota NSC United were an American soccer team which became a member of the National Premier Soccer League (NPSL), the fourth tier of the American Soccer Pyramid, and played in the Midwest Conference in 2006. The team was affiliated with, and played their home matches at, the National Sports Center in the city of Blaine, Minnesota, 16 miles north of downtown Minneapolis. It was coached by Alan Merrick, a former player in the North American Soccer League.

The team replaced the Minnesota Blast in the NPSL. The Blast were a semiprofessional indoor soccer team based at the SoccerBlast facility in Burnsville, Minnesota.

During the offseason in 2006, Minnesota NSC United left the league. The team's management announced that they would spend the 2007 NPSL season on hiatus. This team no longer exists.

== Year-by-year ==
Year	Division	League	Reg. season	Playoffs	Open Cup
2006	"4"	NPSL	5th, Midwest	Did not qualify	Did not qualify
