= Northern Nevada Aces =

- Full name: Northern Nevada Aces
- Nickname: Aces
- Founded: 2001
- Dissolved: 2004
- League: Men's Premier Soccer League
Home colors	Away colors

The Northern Nevada Aces were an American soccer club founded in 2001 based in Reno, Nevada. The team played for two seasons in the now defunct USL D-3 Pro League (later known as the USL Second Division), the third tier of the American soccer pyramid. The Aces would become a founding member of the Men's Premier Soccer League (later known as the National Premier Soccer League), switching to the league to play two seasons from 2003-2004, before folding following the 2004 season.

== History ==
The Northern Nevada Aces were founded in 2001 in Reno, Nevada to begin play in the USL D-3 Pro League, considered the third division of the American soccer pyramid. They would play two seasons in the league, finishing 5th in 2001 and 6th in 2002, both in the Western Conference.

The Aces would voluntarily drop down to the newly created amateur Men's Premier Soccer League, becoming a founding member in 2003 alongside two other former USL D-3 Pro clubs, the Chico Rooks and Arizona Sahuaros. A neighboring new amateur team, the Nevada Wonders, would debut in the fourth division USL Premier Development League (PDL), in Carson City, Nevada in 2003.

The Aces would finish 4th in the regular season in 2003, losing in the play-off semifinals to the neighboring Utah Salt Ratz 9-0. The club would drop to 9th place in the next season in 2004, folding following the season.

The club's away colors were red and black with white trim.

== Head coaches ==
- Paul Aigbogun (2001-2002)

== Year-by-year ==
Year	Division	League	Reg. season	Playoffs	Open Cup
2001	3	USL D-3 Pro League	6th, Western	Did not qualify	Did not qualify
2002	3	USL D-3 Pro League	5th, Western	Did not qualify	Did not qualify
2003	N/A	MPSL	4th	Semifinals	Did not qualify
2004	N/A	MPSL	9th	Did not qualify	Did not qualify
