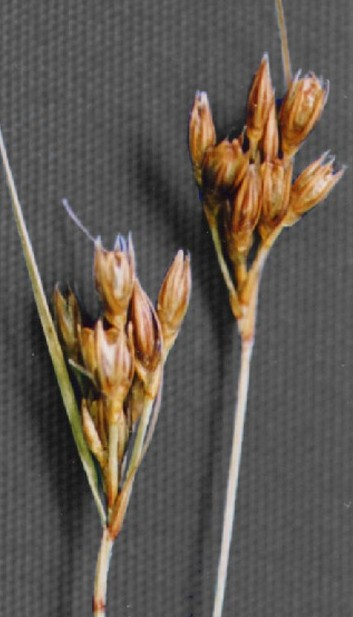

Scientific classification
- Kingdom: Plantae
- Clade: Tracheophytes
- Clade: Angiosperms
- Clade: Monocots
- Clade: Commelinids
- Order: Poales
- Family: Juncaceae
- Genus: Juncus
- Species: J. confusus

Binomial name
- Juncus confusus Coville

Synonyms
- Juncus exilis

= Juncus confusus =

Species of grass

Juncus confusus is a species of rush known by the common name Colorado rush. It is native to western North America from British Columbia to northern California to Colorado, where it grows in coniferous forests and wet, grassy areas such as mountain meadows. It is a bunching rhizomatous perennial herb which grows to a maximum height between 30 and 50 centimeters. Its thready leaves grow from the base of the light green stems to about 15 centimeters long. The inflorescence atop the stem is an array of individual flowers and there is a long bract at the base which may be up to 8 centimeters in length. Each flower has long, pointed tepals with dark and light longitudinal stripes and membranous, translucent borders. There are six stamens. The fruit is a light to dark brown oval-shaped or rounded capsule.
