= Utah Salt Ratz =

- Full name: Utah Salt Ratz
- Nickname: Salt Ratz
- Founded: 2003
- Dissolved: 2004
- Ground: Rice-Eccles Stadium; Salt Lake City, Utah
- Capacity: 32,500
- Owner: Ralph Hansen
- Head coach: Mike Hickman Sr.
- League: National Premier Soccer League
- 2004: Regular season: 4th Playoffs: Champions
Home colors	Away colors

Utah Salt Ratz were an American soccer team founded in 2003 that was a member of the National Premier Soccer League (NPSL), the fourth tier of the American soccer pyramid. The team folded in 2004, when the then-new Real Salt Lake franchise joined the first division, Major League Soccer.

They played their home games at Juan Diego Catholic High School and Rice-Eccles Stadium in Salt Lake City, Utah, and were hugely successful in their brief history, finishing first overall in the NPSL regular season in 2003 and winning the NPSL Championship title in 2004.

== History ==
The Utah Salt Ratz were founded in Salt Lake City, Utah in 2003 to compete in the National Premier Soccer League (NPSL), considered the fourth tier of the American soccer pyramid and roughly equivalent to the USL Premier Development League (PDL). The team was owned by Ralph Hansen, who started the club with money he had embezzled from Intermountain Health Care in Sandy, Utah. and played their homes games out of Juan Diego Catholic High School in Draper, Utah.

The club would start strong in their inaugural season in 2003, finishing first overall in the league with a 12–3–0 (W-L-D) season. They would go on to defeat the Northern Nevada Aces 9–0 in the playoff semi-final, but would lose out to rivals Arizona Sahuaros 2–1 in the Championship final.

Following their promising debut, the Salt Ratz would finish fourth in the regular season in 2004 with an 11–5–0 record, but go on to triumph in the playoffs, defeating Chico Rooks 1–0 in the semi-finals and claiming revenge over Arizona in the Championship final, defeating the Sahuaros 4–2.

The team would fold following their championship victory in 2004, in part to make way for the newly debuted first division professional club, Real Salt Lake, which would begin play in Major League Soccer (MLS) in 2005. This decision would mimic that of the Utah Blitzz, the neighboring third division USL Pro Select League team, that would fold in the same year to make way for the new MLS club.

== Year-by-year ==
Year	Division	League	Regular season	Playoffs	Open Cup
2003	4	MPSL	1st	Finalist	Did not qualify
2004	4	MPSL	4th	Champions	Did not qualify

== Head coaches ==
- Bob Martin (2003–2004)
- Mike Hickman Sr. (2004)

== Honors ==
- MPSL Champions 2004
- MPSL Regular Season Champions 2003

== See also ==
- Real Salt Lake
- Utah Blitzz
