= Inter Nashville FC =

- Full name: Inter Nashville Football Club
- Founded: November 18, 2016; 9 years ago
- Stadium: International Indoor Soccer Complex; Antioch, Tennessee
- Capacity: 500
- President: Pedro Reyes
- Head Coach: Alan O'Connor
- League: UPSL
- Website: http://www.internashfc.com/

Inter Nashville FC is an amateur soccer team based in Nashville suburb of Antioch, Tennessee. They began play in the National Premier Soccer League in May 2017, following Nashville FC folding. The team underwent an extended hiatus following the COVID-19 pandemic before returning to play in 2025 as members of the United Premier Soccer League's Premier Division.

== History ==
Inter Nashville FC's roots begin in 2010, when club owner, Pedro Reyes purchased a parcel of land in Antioch, Tennessee to construct his first soccer facility. During that time, Reyes created a youth and local soccer setup known as Inter Nashville, alluding to the international culture of the city. By 2011, INFC created its first youth and adult league programs and assembled its first travel soccer program in 2014. On November 18, 2016, it was announced in conjuncture with Richard Askey and Jomo Cromwell, INFC bought a franchise for the National Premier Soccer League and begin to field a senior men's team in 2017.

Inter Nashville FC finished its inaugural campaign with a 6-2-4 record, third in the Southeast Conference's West Division. The club won four straight playoff games before losing to Midland-Odessa FC in the Regional Finals.

In 2018, Inter Nashville finished with a 6-6-2 record, fourth in the Southeast Conference, losing in the Conference Quarterfinals to Asheville City SC 3-1. The following season, Inter Nashville went 4-5-1, qualifying for their third playoff appearance in as many seasons, losing in the Conference Semifinals to Chattanooga FC 3-0.

After the NPSL cancelled the 2020 season due to the COVID-19 pandemic, Inter Nashville FC announced that it would remain on hiatus for the 2021 season.

In February 2025, Inter Nashville FC announced tryouts for the UPSL's Spring Season on their Facebook page, marking their return to competitive play for the first time since 2019. Their first match in the UPSL's Premier Division was a 3-2 loss to Lexington SC on March 30.

== Honors ==
- NPSL Southeast Conference Champion: 2017

== Staff ==
Position	Staff
Owner and President	Pedro Reyes
General Manager	(England) Richard Askey
Head Coach	(Republic of Ireland) Alan O'Connor

Last updated: 24 November 2016
Source: Inter Nashville FC
