= Albuquerque Asylum =

Soccer team in New Mexico, United States

- Full name: Albuquerque Asylum Football Club
- Nickname: The Asylum
- Founded: 2004
- Ground: Menaul School
- Capacity: ????
- Chairman: (United States) Opal Stalls
- Manager: (United States) Dennis Genas
- League: National Premier Soccer League
- 2009: on hiatus
Home colors	Away colors

Albuquerque Asylum was an American soccer team based in Albuquerque, New Mexico, United States. Founded in 2004, the team was a member of the National Premier Soccer League (NPSL), a national amateur league at the fourth tier of the American Soccer Pyramid. The team is currently on hiatus from the NPSL due to a lack of teams in the Southwest Division.

The team plays its home games at the stadium on the campus of Menaul School. The team's colors are gold and navy blue and white.

The team has a sister organization, Albuquerque Lady Asylum, which plays in the Women's Premier Soccer League.

== Year-by-year ==
Year	Division	League	Reg. season	Playoffs	Open Cup
2004	4	NPSL	2nd	Semi finals	Did not qualify
2005	4	NPSL	5th, Western	Did not qualify	Did not qualify
2006	4	NPSL	1st, Southwest	Conference Final	Did not qualify
2007	4	NPSL	3rd, Southwest	Did not qualify	Did not qualify
2008	4	NPSL	3rd, Southwest	Did not qualify	Did not qualify

== Honors ==
- NPSL Southwest Division Champions 2006
- Rest In Peace P.G

== Coaches ==
- (England) Dennis Genas (2006–2008)

== Stadia ==
- Lovelace Soccer Complex; Santa Ana Pueblo, New Mexico (2004–2005)
- Stadium at Menaul School; Albuquerque, New Mexico (2006–present)

== Indoor team ==
The Albuquerque Asylum indoor team is a member of the Premier Arena Soccer League (PASL), the development league for the Professional Arena Soccer League (PASL-Pro), and plays in the Rocky Mountain Conference against teams from Rio Rancho, Colorado Springs, Windsor, Golden, and Fort Collins. They play their home matches at the Blades Multi Plex in the city of Rio Rancho, New Mexico, and also play in blue and white.

=== PASL Roster ===
Note: Flags indicate national team as defined under FIFA eligibility rules; some limited exceptions apply. Players may hold more than one non-FIFA nationality.

No.	Pos.	Nation	Player
—	MF	USA	Gabriel Baca
—		COL	Diego Barrera
—	MF	USA	Ryan Berry
—	DF	USA	Rob Bower
—	MF	USA	Cameron Clarke
—	MF	USA	Michael Clarke
—		USA	Cory Dean
—		USA	Eric Dean
—	MF	FRA	Jean Fankam
—		USA	Andrew Gibson
—	GK	USA	Mike Graczyk

No.	Pos.	Nation	Player
—	FW	USA	Patrick Grange
—		USA	Cody Hanna
—		USA	Jeffrey Starkey
—	MF/DF	USA	Marcus Chambers
—	DF	USA	Todd Padgett
—		USA	Lane Peercy
—		USA	Stuart Richardson
—	MF	USA	Brett Stalls
—	DF	SRB	Lucien Starzynski
—		USA	Joel Thiessen

=== Year-by-year ===
Year	League	Conference	Reg. season	Playoffs
2007 – Winter	PASL	Rocky Mountains	2nd Place	International Finalist

== Notable players ==
- Kyle Altman (born 1986)
