= Sporting Arizona FC =

- Full name: Sporting Arizona Football Club
- Founded: 2016; 10 years ago
- Stadium: Gateway Park; El Mirage, Arizona
- Capacity: 2,000
- Manager: Heber Valenzuela
- League: UPSL
- Website: sportingarizona.com
Home colors

Sporting Arizona Football Club is an American developmental soccer team based in Arizona that was founded in 1989. They compete in the United Premier Soccer League (UPSL) Premier Division.

== History ==
The club originally started in 1989 as the "Phoenix Hearts" in the original indoor SISL league. They made an immediate impact on the league when they went to the 1989–1990 SISL indoor championship before falling to the Addison Arrows. Hearts coach Peter Baralić was named Coach of the Year.

They changed their name to the "Arizona Cotton" in 1992 and played both indoor and outdoor for one more year in the USISL, before joining the amateur USISL Premier League in 1995. In 1992, they again went to the final of the USISL Indoor season, losing to the Atlanta Magic. The Arizona coach, Zelimar Antonievic, was named Coach of the Year.

In 1996, the team became the "Arizona Phoenix". In 1997, they changed their name again, this time to "Arizona Sahuaros", and moved up to the USISL D-3 Pro League. In 1998, the Sahuaros front office named 3 player coaches to take over the Sahuaros Professional franchise, Mate Kozul (Head Coach), Edson Rico and Roger Salazar (Assistant coaches). With their connections in the Valley they assembled a strong team of former HS Gatorade Players of the Year, College All Americans and National JUCO Champions from Yavapai College. That year the Sahuaros were crowned the Western Division Champions and coach Matt Kozul was named USISL Coach of the Year.

After the 2002 season, the Sahuaros left the USL D-3 Pro League and helped form the new Men's Premier Soccer League, finishing the season as champions in the first year. The Sahuaros competed in the NPSL until 2004, after which the club chose to play in USASA affiliated leagues. They re-joined the NPSL in 2008. In 2003–2009, the Sahuaros hired Petar Draksin as their head coach, he made a significant contribution to the Sahuaros franchise by bringing in many talented players and winning many significant games in the different leagues.

In 2016, the Sahuaros were renamed "Sporting AZ FC." They joined the UPSL on January 8, 2017, and were placed in the Arizona Conference along with the Arizona Scorpions FC, El Salto United FC & Super Inter AZ. Sporting AZ FC won the Arizona Conference in their 1st season in the UPSL, moving on to the UPSL National Quarterfinals. The team was led by head coach Tim Marchisotto and standout goalkeeper Jake Rybicki. 2018 saw the team raise the bar again, with Marchisotto moving into the general manager role and the addition of Aidan Davison as head coach. The duo achieved success with the team. Sporting AZ won the new Southwest Conference of the UPSL and went to the UPSL Championship game.

In January 2020, "Sporting AZ FC" was renamed "Sporting Arizona Football Club and with the new name came a new ownership. The club continues the same original traditions as a development pathway for players and coaches to reach the professional ranks. In seasons 2021 and 2022, the Club fielded two teams in the United Premier Soccer League (UPSL) – Sporting Arizona FC and SAFC Sahuaros. Sporting Arizona FC coached by Eric Junis Aguilar won the UPSL Division 1 title. In season 2023, the Club has fielded the two teams in the inaugural Southwest Premier League – Arizona Premier. Sporting Arizona coached by Omar Ledesma has won the league with SAFC Sahuaros coached by Eric Junis Aguilar taking second place. Since 2021, Sporting Arizona FC has been the exclusive 'path-to-pro' partner of State 48 FC, Arizona's fastest growing youth and community soccer development club.

== Players ==
=== Notable former players ===
- (Honduras) Roger Espinoza (2013 – Premier League – Wigan Athletic) (2008 SuperDraft – MLS 11th pick in the 1st round – Kansas City Wizards)
- (United States) Allen Chapman (Professional referee working in MLS since 2012)
- (United States) Nick DeLeon (2012 Super Draft – MLS 7th pick in the 1st round – DC United)
- (United States) Justin Meram
- (United States) Scott Maxwell (1991/92 Indoor Season – acquired from SISL's Amarillo Challengers)
- (United States) Randy Soderman

== Year-by-year ==
=== Outdoor team ===
Year	Division	League	Reg. season	Playoffs	Open Cup
Phoenix Hearts
1990		SISL	3rd, Western	Quarter-finals	Did not enter
1991		SISL	5th, Southwest	Did not qualify	Did not enter
Arizona Cotton
1992		USISL	4th, Southwest	Did not qualify	Did not enter
1993		USISL	7th, Southwest	Did not qualify	Did not enter
1994	3	USISL	5th, Southwest	Did not qualify	Did not enter
1995	4	USISL Premier League	6th, Western	Did not qualify	Did not qualify
Arizona Phoenix
1996	4	USISL Premier League	3rd, Western Southern	Division Semi-finals	Did not qualify
Arizona Sahuaros
1997	3	USISL D-3 Pro League	6th, West	Did not qualify	Did not qualify
1998	3	USISL D-3 Pro League	1st, Western Division	Quarter-finals	2nd round
1999	3	USL D-3 Pro League	3rd, Western	Conference Semi-finals	2nd round
2000	3	USL D-3 Pro League	6th, Western	Did not qualify	Did not qualify
2001	3	USL D-3 Pro League	4th, Western	Conference Semi-finals	Did not qualify
2002	3	USL D-3 Pro League	3rd, Western	1st round	Did not qualify
2003	4	MPSL	3rd	Champions	Did not qualify
2004	4	MPSL	3rd	Runner-up	Did not qualify
2005	On Hiatus				
2006		USASA	n/a	n/a	1st round – Sahuaros (USASA) vs BYU Cougars (USL-PDL) 5–1; 2nd Round – Sahuaros (USASA) vs Virginia Beach Mariners (USL-D1) 0–1
2007		USASA	n/a	n/a	Did not qualify
2008	4	NPSL	2nd, Southwest	Did not qualify	1st round
2009		USASA	n/a	n/a	1st round – El Paso Patriots (USL-PDL) vs Sahuaros (USASA) 2–1
2010		USASA	n/a	n/a	1st round – Sahuaros (NPSL) vs Ventura County Fusion (USL-PDL) 1–1 regulation 4–2 PKs; 2nd Round – Austin Aztex (USSF-D2) vs Sahuaros (NPSL) 3–1
2011	On Hiatus				
2012		USASA	n/a	n/a	Did not qualify
2013		USASA	n/a	n/a	Did not qualify
2014		USASA	n/a	n/a	Did not qualify
2015		USASA	n/a	n/a	Did not qualify
2016		USASA	n/a	n/a	Did not qualify
Sporting AZ FC
2017 (Spring)		UPSL	1st, Arizona Conference	Quarter-finals	Did not qualify
2018 (Spring)		UPSL	1st, Southwest Conference	Championship Final	1st round – Sporting AZ FC (UPSL) vs FC Arizona (NPSL) 1–0; 2nd Round – Sporting AZ FC (UPSL) vs Phoenix Rising FC (USL) 1–1 regulation 5–4 PKs; 3rd Round – Fresno FC (USL) vs Sporting AZ FC (UPSL) 2–1 in overtime.
2021 (Spring)		UPSL	1st, Arizona 1st Division Conference		
2022–23 (Spring)		SWPL	1st, Arizona Premier		
2022–23 (Fall)		UPSL	2nd, Arizona 1st Division Conference		

=== Indoor team ===
Year	League	Reg. season	Playoffs
Phoenix Hearts
1989/90	SISL Indoor	1st, Cactus	Championship Final
1990/91	SISL Indoor	4th, Southwest	Quarter-finals
1991/92	USISL Indoor	4th, Southwest	Did not qualify
Arizona Cotton
1992/93	USISL Indoor	2nd, Southwest	Championship Final

== Honors ==
- MPSL Champions 2003
- USL D-3 Pro League West Division Champions 1998
- SISL Cactus Division Champions 1989/90 (Indoor)
- UPSL Arizona Conference Champions 2017 (Spring Season)
- UPSL Southwest Conference Champions 2018 (Spring Season)
- UPSL Southwest Conference Division 1 Champions 2022 (Spring Season)
- SWPL Arizona Premier Champions 2023 (Spring Season)

== Hall of Fame ==
- (United States) Mate Kozul Induction year 2009
- (United States) Edson Rico Induction year 2009
- (United States) Roger Salazar Induction year 2009
- (United States) Harold Calvo Induction year 2018

== Head coaches/Assistant coaches ==
- (United States) Peter Baralić (1989–1991)
- (United States) Cole Antonijevic (1992)
- (United States) Zelimar Antonijevic (1993–1995)
- (United States) Dave Murray (1996)
- (United States) Walter Brusic (1996–1998)
- (United States) Mate Kozul (1998–1999)
  - (United States) Asst. Edson Rico (1998–1999)
  - (United States) Asst. Roger Salazar (1998–1999)
- (United States) Manny Arias (1999–2001)
  - (United States) Asst. Tim Marchisotto (2000–2003)
- (United States) Petar Draksin (2002–2009)
- (Albania) Orhan Kraja (2010–2011)
- (United States) Tim Marchisotto (2012–2017)
- (Northern Ireland) Aidan Davison (2017–2018)
- (England) Tom Hurdle (2019–2020)
- (Mexico) Eric Junis Aguilar (2020–2022)
- (England) Tim Schicky (2021–2022)
- (Mexico) Eric Junis Aguilar (2022–present)
- (Mexico) Omar Ledesma (2022–2023)
- (United States) Roberto Biell (2023–present)
