= National Premier Soccer League =

Soccer league

- Founded: 2003; 23 years ago
- Country: United States
- Confederation: U.S. Soccer
- Divisions: 8 conferences (Across 4 Regions)
- Number of clubs: 92
- Domestic cup: U.S. Open Cup
- Current champions: El Farolito SC (2nd Title)
- Most championships: Miami FC & El Farolito SC (2 titles each)
- Broadcaster(s): YouTube (online streaming)
- Website: npsl.com
- Current: 2026 NPSL season

The National Premier Soccer League (NPSL) is an American men's soccer league established in 2003. The league is officially affiliated to the United States Adult Soccer Association (USASA) and has automatic qualification for the U.S. Open Cup. It is the successor of the Men's Premier Soccer League, a regional league originally based in the Western United States, which has now expanded nationwide to encompass teams from 21 states, and Washington D.C. The league's motto is "A National League with a Regional Focus".

== Competition format ==
The National Premier Soccer League is divided into four separate regions (Northeast, South, Midwest, and West). Each region is divided into conferences with a varying number of teams per conference. The regular season runs from May to July with the exception of the West Region that has historically started in late March or early April.

The NPSL currently has automatic berths in the U.S. Open Cup where they gain eligibility towards the CONCACAF Champions League.

== History ==
Logo used from 2003 to 2015.

A variant of the logo above.

The National Premier Soccer League began in 2003 as the Men's Premier Soccer League (MPSL) initially as an offshoot of the Women's Premier Soccer League, and marked the first instance of a women's soccer league spawning a men's league. The league's first two champions were the Arizona Sahuaros, who had defected to the MPSL from the USL D-3 Pro League, and the Utah Salt Ratz.

The league expanded into the Midwest in 2005 with the addition of several new teams and a new conference, and changed its name to National Premier Soccer League to reflect its new national footprint; a team from the expansion conference – Detroit Arsenal – won the league in its first year after its eastward expansion. The NPSL expanded further in 2007 with the addition of a new Northeast Conference and five new teams from the Eastern United States. The first team from the East to win the national NPSL title was the Pennsylvania Stoners in 2008. The league has since continued to expand, adding more teams throughout the entirety of the country.

Since its inception, the league has managed to place at least one team actively playing under its banner into U.S. Open Cup competition. Though the showing of the NPSL in US Open Cup play was typically only one or two teams in its first six years, the 2009 and 2010 cups have seen four and three, respectively, NPSL teams in each tournament. The recent success of the NPSL in USASA qualifying has encouraged a movement by which the league could have automatic berths in the final tournament. The furthest a team from the NPSL has reached in the US Open Cup during the professional era (1997 and onward after the entry of MLS teams) has been the third round. However, the Brooklyn Italians have won the US Open Cup outright before the existence of either MLS or the NPSL.

Although no team has ever won the league twice, the Miami FC camp has won the championship twice as a club. Its reserve team (Miami FC 2) won the 2018 title, and its first team (Miami FC) won the 2019 championship.

In summer 2024, several teams left the NPSL and formed the breakaway League for Clubs, citing poor relations with the league office, concerns about governance and stability, and a desire for a member-driven structure better suited to community-run clubs. The breakaway teams included Tulsa Athletic, FC Davis, Napa Valley 1839 FC and Kingston Stockade FC.

=== Regional conferences ===
In the fall of 2024, following the creation of the League for Clubs, the NPSL reorganised and announced the establishment of regional conference leagues that would provide a path for more teams to reach the Tier 1 status held by full NPSL sides within USASA. The first conference will be the Pacific Conference. It will consist of the following six teams: JASA Redwood City, Marin County SC, Racing Sacramento City FC, Real San Jose, San Leandro United FC, and Yemen United California. The new conference will start in the fall of 2024. In September 2025, NPSL announced changes to their plans for their regional conferences, officially naming them NPSL–RL and naming Jason Brown managing director. The new regional conferences will run both spring and fall seasons, starting in the spring of 2026.

== Status ==
Officially, the USSF does not recognize formal levels of the soccer pyramid below the professional 3rd tier. The USSF does not officially recognize distinctions between amateur soccer leagues in the United States. However, the USASA sanctions affiliated, but separately run, national leagues that are recognized in practical terms as playing at a higher level than the USASA state association leagues; for example, they receive automatic berths to the US Open Cup. In November 2022, USASA announced it had established a Tier 1, which would be its top national tier. This designation would be based on financial stability and sustainability. After 20 years of association with USASA, NPSL would become their first Tier 1 league.

The National Premier Soccer League recruits amateur talent from around the United States. NPSL does not have any age limits or restrictions, thus incorporating both college players and former professional players alike.

== Organization ==
The NPSL is organized in a mostly decentralized structure and is managed as a team-run league. Each year, the member clubs help elect a chairman, treasurer, and secretary and an eight-member board of directors. Each team is individually owned and operated, and is responsible for maintaining league minimum standards. New teams seeking membership into the NPSL are subject to approval from an executive committee of existing team owners. Member clubs have the right to make localized decisions for their respective markets, conferences, and regions based on what they believe is best for their particular region. Each conference is managed by the individual member clubs and elects a conference commission each year.

The current chairman is Kenny Farrell of the New Orleans Jesters.

The costs to join the league as of 2016 are reported to be a one-time $15,000 franchise fee and a $5,250 annual league fee. The low entry fee compared to USL League Two's of $50,000 has made the league an attractive alternative to teams looking to compete at the highest level of amateur play.

The league requires that all teams play in stadiums with at least 500 seats, a scoreboard, and locker rooms with showers for both teams and officials. The home team is also responsible for providing water and food for the visiting team, ensuring there is a trainer or doctor on-site for the match, and paying the referees fees at the end of each game.

=== Sponsorship and partnerships ===
Mitre Sports International provided the official ball for the NPSL starting in 2014. Global Scarves began providing custom soccer scarves throughout the league, and worked with the NPSL on various events and contests to increase awareness and fervor throughout the 2014 NPSL season. Renegade GK, Hummel, MyCujoo, Passage, Carbon Athletics, GCG Sports, Activate Canopy, and HomeLight are all listed as current business partners (2021).

== Teams ==
=== Current teams ===
Team	City	Stadium	Founded	First NPSL Season	Head coach
Central States Conference
FC Milwaukee Torrent	Wauwatosa, Wisconsin	Hart Park	2015	2016	(United States) Steve Provan
FC Pride Elite	Indianapolis, Indiana	Lawrence Soccer Complex	2001	2025	(England) Jamie Gilbert
Gio's Lions SC Chicago	Chicago, Illinois	Barda-Dowling Stadium		2024	
Michigan Rangers FC	Grand Rapids, Michigan	Farmers Insurance Athletic Complex		2024	(Republic of Ireland) Stuart Collins
Southern Indiana Guardians FC	Floyds Knobs, Indiana	Woehrle Field / Lou City Training Complex		2024	
Wisconsin Conquerors FC	Marshfield, Wisconsin	Kenneth & Ardyce Heiting Community Stadium		2024	(Portugal) Ricardo Jorge Oliveira Pedro
Golden Gate Conference
Cruizers FC	Modesto, California	John Thurman Field		2025	
El Farolito SC	San Francisco, California	Boxer Stadium	1985	2018	(United States) Santiago Lopez
Oakland Stompers	Oakland, California	Raimondi Park	2009	2021	
Real San Jose	San Jose, California	PAL Stadium	2007	2025	
Sun City FC	El Paso, Texas	Sunland Park Complex	2025	2026	
Vacaville Elite	Vallejo, California	SPSV Stadium	2009	2026	
Great Lakes Conference
Ambassadors FC Ohio	Canton, Ohio	Dr. David & Winnie King Field	2021	2025	(United States) Ryan Dean
Buffalo Stallions	Buffalo, New York	North Tonawanda High School	2025	2025	(United States) Mark Spacone
Cleveland SC	Berea, Ohio	George Finnie Stadium	2018	2018	(Romania) Vlad Muresan
Erie Commodores FC	Erie, Pennsylvania	Saxon Stadium	2009	2009	(Spain) Catalin Nastuta
Flower City Union	Rochester, New York	Rochester Community Sports Complex Stadium	2020	2024	(United Kingdom) Jordan Sullivan
Niagara 1812	Niagara Falls, New York	Niagara University	2024	2024	(Canada) Lucio Ianiero
Rochester NY FC Academy	West Henrietta, New York	RNYFC Athletic Complex	1966	2025	
Keystone Conference
FC Motown	Madison, New Jersey	Ranger Stadium	2012	2013	(United States) Dilly Duka
Hershey FC	Hershey, Pennsylvania	Hershey High School Stadium	2013	2013	(United States) Dustin Bixler
Jackson Lions FC	Toms River, New Jersey	Donovan Catholic High School	2014	2022	(United States) William Fraley
New Jersey United AC	Holmdel, New Jersey	Roggy Field	2024	2025	(United States) Fernando Barboto
Players Development Academy	Lawrenceville, New Jersey	Walter E. Nolan Stadium		2025	Dan Keefe
Philadelphia Ukrainian Nationals SC	Philadelphia, Pennsylvania	Ukrainian American Sport Center	1950	2022	
West Chester Predators	West Chester, Pennsylvania	West Chester United Turf Field	1976	2024	(United States) Blaise Santangelo
West Chester United SC	West Chester, Pennsylvania	Ciccarone Field	1976	2017	(United States) Blaise Santangelo
Mid-Atlantic Conference
Alexandria Reds	Alexandria, Virginia	Limerick Field	1970	2022	
District Elite FC	Washington D.C.	University of the District of Columbia	2012	2025	TBD
DMV Elite FC	Bladensburg, Maryland	Bladensburg High School	2022	2024	(Argentina) Gustavo Onaindia
FC Frederick	Frederick, Maryland	Thomas Athletic Field	1986	2015	(Scotland) Chris Spinks
Grove Soccer United	Glen Allen, Virginia	Deep Run High School	2021	2022	
Hub City FC	Hagerstown, Maryland	North Hagerstown High School	2025	2026	TBD
Ristozi FC	Owings Mills, Maryland	Mustang Stadium	2022	2025	(United States) Dylan Shepherd
Virginia Beach City FC	Norfolk, Virginia	Powhatan Field	2013	2014	(Belgium) Stéphane Thys
Virginia Dream FC	Falls Church, Virginia	Meridian High School	2022	2023	TBD
North Conference
Dakota Fusion FC	Fargo, North Dakota	Jim Gotta Stadium	2016	2017	(Trinidad and Tobago) Kristoff Burkett
Duluth FC	Duluth, Minnesota	Public Schools Stadium	2015	2017	(Northern Ireland) Sean Morgan
Joy Athletic Club	St. Louis Park, Minnesota	Oriole Stadium	2009	2021	(United States) Arinze Ezirike
Minnesota Blizzard FC	Lakeville, Minnesota	Lakeville North High School Stadium	2023	2024	(United States) Forrest Randall
Sioux Falls Thunder FC	Sioux Falls, South Dakota	Harrisburg High School	2016	2016	
Siouxland United FC	Sioux City, Iowa	Bishop Heelan Memorial Field	2023	2024	(United States) Alex Trent
North Atlantic Conference
AC Newport	Newport, Rhode Island	Toppa Field	2026	2026	
America Soccer Club New York	Long Island, New York	Captains Field	2012	2025	
New Haven United FC	New Haven, Connecticut	Reese Stadium	2025	2025	(Albania) Kledis Capollari
New York Shockers	Albany, New York	Afrim's Sports Park	2021	2021	(United States) Matt Esposito
Osner's FC	Brooklyn, New York	Belson Stadium	2015	2025	(Colombia) Christian Turizo
Santa Cruz FC	Lowell, Massachusetts	Doucette Stadium	2021	2026	Francisco Fernandes
Southeast Conference
865 Alliance	Knoxville, Tennessee	Clinton Dragon Stadium	2008	2023	Mike Meyer
Bristol Rhythm AFC	Bristol, Tennessee/Bristol, Virginia	Gene Malcolm Stadium	2024	2024	(Netherlands) Dave Neijenhuis
Burlington United FC	Burlington, North Carolina	MacPherson Stadium	2025	2025	(Brazil) Diego Walsh
Charlottetowne Hops FC	Charlotte, North Carolina	CSA OrthoCarolina Sportsplex	2023	2023	(Iran) Morteza Ebrahimi
Greenville United FC	Greenville, North Carolina	John Paul II Catholic High School Athletic Campus	2020	2023	Josh Horne
Mint Hill FC	Mint Hill, North Carolina	Mint Hill Veteran's Memorial Park	2022	2026	Airon Reyes
Statesville FC	Statesville, North Carolina	Statesville High School Greyhound Stadium - The Ville	2025	2026	(United States) Nick Brown

==== Future Teams ====
Team	City	Stadium	Founded	Joining	Head coach
Boston Harbor FC	Salem, Massachusetts	Captain John Bertram Athletic Field	2026	2027	TBD
Catena FC	Salisbury, Maryland	TBD	2026	2027	TBD
Fuego FC	Fresno, California	Fresno State Soccer Stadium	2020	2027	TBD

=== Expansion ===
Year	No. of teams	Teams added	Teams departed
2003	6		
2004	10	5	1
2005	13	7	4
2006	18	5	0
2007	22	12	8
2008	25	12	9
2009	27	12	10
2010	31	12	8
2011	37	13	7
2012	46	13	5
2013	57	20	9
2014	77	31	11
2015	68	12	21
2016	84	23	7
2017	96	30	18
2018	98	18	16
2019	91	11	19
2020	94	22	19
2021	90	15	19
2022	92	19	17
2023	94	16	15
2024	89	18	23
2025	75	18	32
2026	55	7	27

Locations of NPSL clubs for 2017. Blue = Northeast Region clubs, Yellow = South Region clubs, Green = Midwest Region clubs, Red = West Region clubs

=== Rivalries ===
Many NPSL teams have rivalries given the close geography of the teams throughout the league. The most notable rivalry was the Rust Belt Derby contested between Detroit City FC, AFC Cleveland, and FC Buffalo. The name refers to the teams' shared region, the Rust Belt. Another intense rivalry existed between the San Diego Flash and San Diego Boca/Force FC, which were crosstown rivals in San Diego. Until the 2013 sale and rebranding of Force FC from Boca FC, the ownership groups of the two clubs were previously partners in the original San Diego Flash club of the A-League that competed from 1998 to 2001.

Derby name	Most wins	Titles	Other club(s)	Recent winner
Cheese Barn Derby	Split	2 (2018, (Note: Two game series ended 5–5, with both away teams winning 3–2) 2019)	Cleveland SC, FC Columbus	Split (2019) (Note: Game ended 1–1 with no away goal tiebreaker in place)
Chisolm Trail Clásico	Fort Worth Vaqueros	1 (2019)	Denton Diablos FC	Fort Worth Vaqueros (2019)
El Dustico	Lubbock Matadors	1 (2023)	West Texas FC	Lubbock Matadors (2023)
Kildare's Cup	West Chester United SC	3 (2017–19)	Philadelphia Lone Star FC	West Chester United SC (2019)
Portland Derby	PDX FC	2 (2018, 2019)	International Portland Select FC (1)	PDX FC (2019)
Riverside Derby	Club Xolos USA U-23	4 (2015–18)	Temecula FC (1)	Temecula FC (2019)
Trinity River Cup (Note: Dallas City went on hiatus for the 2018 season, meaning no competition for the cup was held)	Dallas City FC	4 (2014–17)	Fort Worth Vaqueros (1)	Fort Worth Vaqueros (2019)
Wine Country Derby	Sonoma County Sol	2 (2017, 2018)	Napa Valley 1839 FC (1)	Napa Valley 1839 FC (2019)
The Wooden Shoe	Split	2 (2019, 2021)	Hartford City FC, Kingston Stockade	Hartford City FC (2022)
Former derbies
Erie County Derby	Erie Commodores FC	8 (2009–14, 2018, 2022)	FC Buffalo (6)	Erie Commodores FC (2022)
Everglades Cup	Miami United	2 (2013, 2014)	Cape Coral Hurricanes	Miami United (2014)
Gulf Coast Cup	Tampa Marauders	1 (2014)	Cape Coral Hurricanes	Tampa Marauders (2014)
Red River Cup (Note: Event returned in 2020, but only with Tulas Athletic and UPSL side Deportivo Alacranes taking part)	Tulsa Athletic	1 (2014)	Fort Worth Vaqueros, Liverpool Warriors, Oklahoma City FC	Tulsa Athletic (2014)
Louisiana Cup	New Orleans Jesters	1 (2016)	Shreveport Rafters FC	New Orleans Jesters (2016)
Rust Belt Derby	Detroit City FC	6 (2013–16, 2020, 2021)	AFC Cleveland (1), FC Buffalo, Cleveland SC	Detroit City FC (2021)
San Diego Derby (Note: San Diego Boca folded after the 2013 season. The Flash did not take part in the 2016 season, meaning the derby was contested by the two new San Diego teams, Albion SC Pros and North County Battalion.)	San Diego Flash	3 (2011–13)	Albion SC Pros (1), North County Battalion, San Diego Boca FC	Albion SC Pros (2016)
I-40 Cup	Tied	1 each (2016, 2017)	Little Rock Rangers (1), Memphis City FC (1)	Memphis City FC (2017)
Alameda County Derby	CD Aguiluchos USA	2 (2016, 2017)	East Bay FC Stompers	Split (2018) (Note: Series ended tied 3–3 after two games)
Green Line Derby	Minneapolis City SC	2 (2017, 2018)	Viejos son los Trapos FC (St Paul)	Minneapolis City SC (2018)
I-91 Derby	Hartford City FC	2 (2017, 2018)	Elm City Express	Hartford City FC (2018)
Georgia Derby (Note: 2012 series ended in tie, home team won respected leg 3–1) (Note: Derby not played in 2013 as Atlanta went on hiatus)	Atlanta SC	6 (2014–19)	Georgia Revolution FC (1)	Atlanta SC (2019)
Volunteer Shield	Chattanooga FC	5 (2014–16, 2018, 2019)	Knoxville Force (1), Inter Nashville FC, Nashville FC, Memphis City FC	Chattanooga FC (2019)

=== NPSL Members Cup ===
The NPSL Members Cup, originally called the NPSL Founders Cup, was a competition that ran from August to October 2019. It was initially intended to lead to a new professional league beginning play in the spring of 2020. However, following the departure of numerous previously announced teams and issues in launching the professional league the tournament was altered.

Detroit City FC won the cup on October 16, 2019, when the team defeated Michigan Stars FC, 1–0, in the penultimate game of the tournament.

== Records and champions ==
Ed.	Season	Winner	Score	Runner-up	Ref.
1	2003	Arizona Sahuaros	2–1 (a.e.t.)	Utah Salt Ratz	
2	2004	Utah Salt Ratz	4–2	Arizona Sahuaros	
3	2005	Detroit Arsenal	1–0	Sonoma County Sol	
4	2006	Sacramento Knights	2–0	Princeton 56ers	
5	2007	Southern California Fusion	1–0	Queen City FC	
6	2008	Pennsylvania Stoners	3–0	Minnesota Twin Stars	
7	2009	Sonoma County Sol	2–1	Erie Admirals SC	
8	2010	Sacramento Gold	3–1	Chattanooga FC	
9	2011	Jacksonville United	3–2	Hollywood United Hitmen	
10	2012	FC Sonic	1–0	Chattanooga FC	
11	2013	RVA Football Club	2–0	Sonoma County Sol	
12	2014	New York Red Bulls U-23	3–1	Chattanooga FC	
13	2015	New York Cosmos B	3–2 (a.e.t.)	Chattanooga FC	
14	2016	AFC Cleveland	4–2	Sonoma County Sol	
15	2017	Elm City Express	5–0	Midland-Odessa FC	
16	2018	Miami FC 2	3–1	FC Motown	
17	2019	Miami FC	3–1	New York Cosmos B	
–	2020	Season cancelled due to the COVID-19 pandemic			
18	2021	Denton Diablos FC	5–2	Tulsa Athletic	
19	2022	FC Motown	4–3	Crossfire Redmond	
20	2023	Tulsa Athletic	1–1 (PK 8–7)	Apotheos FC	
21	2024	El Farolito SC	2-1	FC Motown	
22	2025	Hickory FC	3–2	El Farolito SC	
23	2026	El Farolito SC	3–0	Bristol Rhythm AFC	

== Awards ==
=== NPSL Golden Boot ===
NPSL Golden Boot
Year	Player	Club	Goals	Ref.
2014	(Ecuador) Victor Manosalvas	New York Red Bulls U-23	12	
2014	(United States) Jason Jones	Sacramento Gold FC	12	
2014	(United States) David Hernandez	Spartans FC	12	
2015	(Portugal) Miguel Herlein	New York Cosmos B	16	
2015	(England) Simon Rawnsley	Aguiluchos USA	16	
2016	(Liberia) Nana Addai	Rhode Island Reds	18	
2016	(England) Simon Rawnsley	Aguiluchos USA	18	
2017	(United States) Alessandro Canale	Orange County FC	18	
2017	(Jamaica) Amani Walker	Albion SC Pros	18	
2018	(Mexico) Omar Nuño	Sonoma County Sol	20	
2019	(Mexico) César Mexia	FC Arizona	18	
2020	none awarded due to COVID-19			
2021	(England) Sidney Warden	Duluth FC	16	
2022	(United States) Damani Camara	FC Columbus	15	
2023	(Japan) Yu Tsukanome	Dakota Fusion FC	16	
2024	(United States) Angel Chavez	Virginia Dream FC	14	
2024	(United States) Philip Caputo	Joy St. Louis Park		
2025	(France) Nicolas Likulia	Virginia Dream FC	17	
2026	(Poland) Patryk Rojek	Philadelphia Ukrainian Nationals SC	14	

=== NPSL Golden Ball ===
NPSL Golden Ball
Season	Player	Club	Ref.
2013	(United States) Ross Middlemiss	Sonoma County Sol	
2014	(Ecuador) Victor Manosalvas	New York Red Bulls U-23	
2015	(Spain) Jon Ander Ibarrondo	Myrtle Beach Mutiny	
2016	(Liberia) Isaac Addai	RI Reds	
2017	(United States) Jade Johnson	Dakota Fusion FC	
2018	(United States) Matt Nigro	FC Motown	
2019	(United States) Christian Enriquez	Albion San Diego	
2020	none awarded due to COVID-19		
2021	(United States) Sam Coad	Denton Diablos FC	
2022	(United States) Christian Soto Rincon	Crossfire Redmond	
2023	(Wales) Dennis Bates	Appalachian FC	
2024	(Canada) Olivier Correa	West Texas FC	
2025	(United States) Antonio Pineda	Hickory FC	
2026	(Honduras) Diego Pinto	Ambassadors FC Ohio	

=== NPSL Golden Glove ===
NPSL Golden Glove
Season	Player	Club	Ref.
2014	(England) Gregory Hartley	Chattanooga FC	
2015	(England) Gregory Hartley	Chattanooga FC	
2016	(England) Gregory Hartley	Chattanooga FC	
2017	(United States) Andrew Weber	FC Arizona	
2018	(Germany) Jan Hoffelner	Duluth FC	
2019	(United States) Christian Coulson	Virginia Beach City FC	
2020	none awarded due to COVID-19		
2021	(England) Conor Cable	Cleveland SC	
2022	(United States) Connor Durant	Laredo Heat	
2023	(United States) Griffin Hemmindinger	Annapolis Blues FC	
2024	(Spain) Vincent Sanchis	Dakota Fusion FC	
2025	(United States) Kevin Gonzalez	El Farolito SC	
2026	(France) Noe Delmotte	Bristol Rhythm AFC	

=== NPSL Young Player of the Year ===
NPSL Young Player of the Year
Season	Player	Club	Ref.
2018	(Kenya) Joseph Okumu	AFC Ann Arbor	
2019	(England) Jamie Smith	Asheville City SC	
2020	none awarded due to COVID-19		
2021	(United States) Ben Bender	FC Baltimore Christos	
2022	(United States) Josh Jones	Philadelphia Ukrainians	
2023	(United States) Kenan Hot	Jackson Lions FC	
2024	(United States) Sam Sarver	Akron City FC	
2025	(United States) Osi Onwudiwe	Alexandria Reds	
2026	(United States) Preston Alessio	New Haven United FC	

=== NPSL Coach of the Year ===
NPSL Coach of the Year
Season	Coach	Club	Ref.
2013	(United States) Grover Gibson	RVA FC	
2014	(United States) Bill Elliott	Chattanooga FC	
2015	(United States) Bill Elliott	Chattanooga FC	
2016	(United States) Bill Elliott	Chattanooga FC	
2017	(United States) Teddy Haley	Elm City Express	
2018	(United States) Carlos Mendes	New York Cosmos B	
2019	(United States) Larry Sancomb	FC Baltimore Christos	
2020	none awarded due to COVID-19		
2021	(United States) Levi Coleman	Tulsa Athletic	
2022	(United States) Dale Parker	Appalachian FC	
2023	(United States) Paul Gilbert	Lubbock Matadors SC	
2024	(Scotland) Colin Herriot	Annapolis Blues FC	
2025	(Spain) Carlos Rubio	Hickory FC	
2026	(Netherlands) Dave Neijenhuis	Bristol Rhythm AFC	

== Back-office ==
Executive committee

- Steven A. Wagoner – Virginia Beach City FC – chairman
- Nathan Walter – Jacksonville Armada FC U-23 – corporate secretary
- William Forte – Oakland Stompers – corporate treasurer
- Cindy Spera - managing director (non-voting)

NPSL board of directors

- Andreas Davi - Midwest - FC Milwaukee Torrent
- John Melody - Midwest - Erie Commodores FC
- John Nunan - West - Sacramento Gold FC

NPSL leadership staff

- Cindy Spera – managing director
- Gary Moody – media relations
- Paul Scott – director of officials
- Dina Case – director of membership development
- Robin Shacket – director of operations and club services
- Jeff Pejsa – brand manager

== eSports ==
In April 2020, the NPSL launched a competitive gaming competition to promote the growth of the league in new areas. The league hopes to "bring its community members together for friendly competition on a virtual pitch". The first nine clubs to formally join the new eSports league were Atlantic City FC, Central Florida Panthers SC, Denton Diablos FC, Duluth FC, Fort Worth Vaqueros, FC Milwaukee Torrent, Muskegon Risers, Gate City FC, and Ozark FC.

The league partnered with Virtual Pro Gaming to assist in operations of the league. Clubs will play full 11 v 11 in pro clubs mode, on FIFA, EA Sports video game.
