= Oakland County FC =

American soccer club

- Full name: Oakland County Football Club
- Founded: 2015; 11 years ago (as Oakland United Football Club)
- Stadium: Royal Oak High School
- Capacity: 2,000
- Owner: Dennis Weiss
- Head Coach: Stephen Walker
- League: USL League Two
- 2024: 5th, Great Lakes Division; Playoffs: DNQ
- Website: oaklandcountyfc.com
Home colors

Oakland County Football Club is an American soccer club based in Royal Oak, Michigan, located in the Detroit metropolitan area. Beginning with the 2020 season, they compete in USL League Two. The club previously competed in the United Premier Soccer League and Premier League of America.

== History ==
Oakland County FC was founded as Oakland United FC in 2015 and played its first season in the Great Lakes Premier League.

In its inaugural season, Oakland United finished fourth in the five-team league, with a record of 2–1–5.

The club rebranded for the 2016 season, with a new name and new logo by New York City-based graphic designer Matthew Wolff. They finished with a final record of 4–2–4, rendering them a fourth-place finish in the PLA East Division.

On January 27, 2017, the club announced that it would be moving to a more centralized location in Royal Oak.

In February 2017, the club announced a new coaching staff: Nicolino Morana was hired as head coach on February 22, and Mathius Johnson as Assistant Coach on February 28.

On June 3, 2017, Oakland County FC hosted the Muskegon Risers. At the match, a club record attendance of 707 was recorded.

In March 2018, OCFC ownership announced the move to Clawson, MI as the new home for the club. On March 1, 2018, the Oakland County FC Supporters’ Trust was established. With the trust, fans can purchase a membership within the trust which grants them an ownership stake of the club.

On March 23, 2018, Nicolino Morana stepped down as head coach of the club to become Technical Director. In turn, Darryl Evans (head coach) and Derek Peters (assistant coach) were announced as the team's coaching staff for the 2018 season.

On November 5, 2019, OCFC was officially announced as a member of USL League Two.

On December 23, 2019, Vinnie Vasilevski was named head coach in replacement of Darryl Evans.

May 9, 2021 marked the inaugural USL League Two match for the club, notching a 3-0 victory over Fort Wayne FC.

On July 5, 2021, OCFC defeated the Flint City Bucks, 3-1, and became the 2022 Michigan Milk Cup Champions.

In 2026, OCFC achieved its best league finish in club history, opening the USL League Two campaign with six consecutive victories and securing second place in the seven-team Great Lakes Division. Although the club narrowly missed its first postseason appearance, the historic season marked another major step forward for OCFC and established a strong foundation for the future.

== Stadium ==
- Clawson Stadium (2018–2021)
- Royal Oak High School (2017, 2022–present)

== Front office ==
=== Ownership ===
- (United States) Dennis Weiss

=== President ===
- (United States) Dominic Troia IV

=== Head coach ===
- (England) Stephen Walker (2024–present)
- (North Macedonia) Vinnie Vasilevski (2019-2022, 2023 (Interim))
- (United States) Brian Doyle (2023)
- (United States) Darryl Evans (2018–2019)
- (United States) Nicolino Morana (2017)
- (Iraq) Waad Sana (2016)

=== Assistant coach ===
- (United States) Steve Arce (2025–present)
- (United States) Michael Lupenec (2025–present)
- (United States) Mike Sheehy (2025–present)
- (United States) Kirk Johnson (2022–2024)
- (Singapore) Timothy Ho (2022-2023)
- (North Macedonia) Borce Kosteski (2021-2022)
- (North Macedonia) Igor Blazevski (2021-2022)
- (United States) Trevor Foster (2021-2022)
- (United States) Craig Dejong (2019)
- (United States) Joseph Beshara (2019)
- (United States) Derek Peters (2018-2019)
- (United States) Matthius Johnson (2017)

== Year-by-year ==
Year	Tier	League	Regular season (W–L–T)	Playoffs	U.S. Open Cup	Michigan Milk Cup	Average Attendance
2015	5	GLPL	4th of 5 (2–1–5)	No playoffs	Ineligible	did not participate	N/A
2016	5	PLA	3rd of 5 (4–2–4)	did not qualify	Participated in 2017 Qualifying	did not participate	409
2017	5	PLA	4th of 5 (4–0–6)	did not qualify	did not qualify	did not participate	395
2018	5	UPSL	4th of 6 (3–0–7)	did not qualify	did not qualify	Lost in QF to AFC Ann Arbor	
2019	5	UPSL	5th of 6 (3–2–5)	did not qualify	did not qualify	Final vs Flint City Bucks, co-champions	
2020	4	USL2	Season cancelled due to COVID-19 pandemic				
2021	4	USL2	6th of 9 (5–6–3)	did not qualify	did not qualify		
2022	4	USL2	4th of 6 (6–7–1)	did not qualify	did not qualify	Won in Final vs Flint City Bucks	
2023	4	USL2	3rd of 7 (5–4–3)	did not qualify	did not qualify		
2024	4	USL2	5th of 8 (4–8–2)	did not qualify	did not qualify		
2025	4	USL2	4th of 8 (6–2–4)	did not qualify	did not qualify		
2026	4	USL2	2nd of 7 (6-4-2)	did not qualify	did not qualify		

== Historic record vs opponents ==
Legend
0-0-0	Win–loss-draw
0–0	Win–loss
*	No games played

Opponent	Regular season	Friendly	U.S. Open	Total	Played	Win %
Aurora Borealis SC	1–0–1	*	*	1–0–1	2	0.500
Carpathia FC	0–4–0	*	*	0–4–0	4	0.000
(Michigan) Ole SC	4–0–0	*	*	4–0–0	4	1.000
(Illinois) RWB Adria	0–4–2	*	*	0–4–2	4	0.000
Toledo United	2–2–0	*	*	2–2–0	2	0.500
(Michigan) AFC Ann Arbor	0–1–1	1–1–0	*	1–2–1	4	0.500
Ann Arbor FC	*	*	1–0–0	1–0–0	1	1.000
(Wisconsin) Croatian Eagles	1–1–0	*	*	1–1–0	2	0.500
(Michigan) Grand Rapids FC	1–1–0	0–1–0	*	1–2–0	3	0.500
Michigan Stars FC	*	0–1–0	*	0–1	1	0.000
Minneapolis City SC	*	*	0–1–0	0–1–0	1	0.000
Muskegon Risers SC	1–1–0	1–1–0	*	2–2–0	4	0.500
Marygrove College	*	0–1–0	*	0–1–0	1	0.000
Livonia City FC	*	1–0–0	*	1–0–0	1	1.000
Kalamazoo FC	*	0–1–0	*	0–0–1	1	.0000
Windsor TFC	*	1–0–0	*	1–0–0	1	1.000
Total	10–14–4	4–6–0	1–1–0	14–20–4	38	0.333

- Note: Table includes all competitive matches and does not include friendlies.
- Updated to end of 2016 season
