= Sports in Milwaukee =

Milwaukee, Wisconsin, is home to a variety of sports teams and events.

== Professional ==
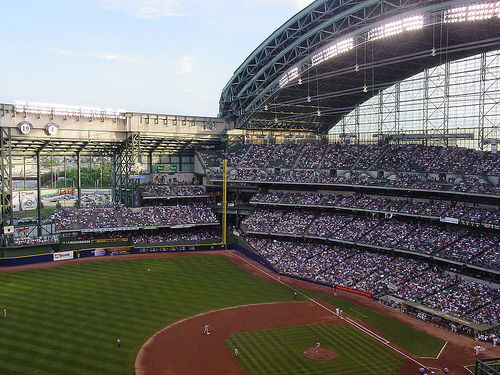
American Family Field, home of the Milwaukee Brewers

Milwaukee has a rich history of involvement in professional sports going back to the late 1960s. Currently, its teams from the major professional sports leagues in the United States and Canada are the Milwaukee Brewers of Major League Baseball (MLB) and the Milwaukee Bucks of the National Basketball Association (NBA).

== Notable teams ==
Club	Sport	Founded	Current league	Stadium	Championships
Milwaukee Brewers	Baseball	1969	Major League Baseball	American Family Field	1 (2026)
Milwaukee Bucks	Basketball	1968	National Basketball Association	Fiserv Forum	2 (1971, 2021)
Milwaukee Milkmen	Baseball	2019	American Association of Professional Baseball	Franklin Field	1 (2020)
Milwaukee Admirals	Ice Hockey	1970	American Hockey League	UW–Milwaukee Panther Arena	2 (1975–76) (USHL), (2003-04) (AHL)
Milwaukee Wave	Indoor soccer	1984	Major Arena Soccer League	UW–Milwaukee Panther Arena	7

Throughout the sports world, Milwaukee is perhaps best known for its tradition of tailgating before Brewers baseball games. The Brewers made their first post-season appearance in 1981 and won the American League pennant in 1982. In 1998, they became the first Major League team in modern history to switch leagues, doing so to accommodate the expansion franchises of the Arizona Diamondbacks and Tampa Bay Devil Rays. They also have the distinction of being the only team to have played in four of the six current Major League divisions. During the 2026 Major League Baseball postseason, the Brewers won their first National League pennant and World Series when they defeated the Tampa Bay Rays 4–1.

The Bucks won the 1971 NBA Championship, a mere three years after joining the league. They made it back to the Finals in 1974, but soon developed a reputation as "next year's champions," winning at least one playoff series for the next 15 years, but having yet to return to the Finals. In 2021 the Bucks won the 2021 NBA Finals, their second championship in franchise history.

The Wave are the longest continuously running professional soccer operation in the United States. They have also been one of the most successful, having captured five league championships in the past nine years.

== Non-professional ==
In addition to professional sports, Milwaukee is home to a number of competitive teams, clubs and leagues at the amateur, college, high school and semi-pro levels.

=== Collegiate ===
School	Nickname	Division	Conference(s)	Varsity Sports Teams
Marquette University	Golden Eagles	NCAA Division I	Big East Conference	11
University of Wisconsin–Milwaukee (Milwaukee)	Panthers	NCAA Division I	Horizon League	15
Milwaukee School of Engineering (Milwaukee Engineering)	Red Raiders	NCAA Division III	Northern Collegiate Hockey Association, Northern Athletics Collegiate Conference	19
Mount Mary University	Blue Angels	NAIA	Chicagoland Collegiate Athletic Conference	6
Alverno College	Inferno	NCAA Division III	Northern Athletics Collegiate Conference	5
Wisconsin Lutheran College	Warriors	NCAA Division III	Northern Athletics Collegiate Conference	14

Under the leadership of Al McGuire, Marquette's men's basketball team became a national powerhouse in the 1970s, capturing the NIT Championship in 1970, and the NCAA Championship in 1977. Not only was the '77 championship McGuire's last game, but Marquette remains the last independent school to win the title. It was also the last major sports championship won by a Milwaukee sports team until the 2021 title run by the Bucks

Led by former NBA star Dwyane Wade, Marquette returned to the Final Four in 2003, but was ousted by Kansas in the semi-finals.

UW–Milwaukee made its first post-season appearance in men's basketball that same year, under the tutelage of current Auburn head coach Bruce Pearl. Although they lost at the buzzer to Notre Dame in the first round, they would make their first NIT appearance the following year. In 2005, UWM had its most successful year ever, winning both the Horizon League regular season and tournament championships. They would go on to upset Alabama in the first round of the NCAA tournament before shocking then Big East powerhouse Boston College on its way to the Sweet 16. So much of an impression had the team made that sportswriters shied away from calling their defeat of sixth-seeded Oklahoma in the 2006 Tournament an "upset," believing UWM may have actually been the better team.

Starting with the 2007–08 season, the Marquette and UWM men's basketball teams will rekindle their annual rivalry game which has been dormant since 1998. The two schools have always shared annual and heated rivalries in all other common NCAA sports.

UWM's men's and women's soccer teams regularly attain national rankings, and the school is also home to the only Division I baseball team in Wisconsin.

=== High school ===
High School athletics in Milwaukee is dominated by the Milwaukee City Conference. However, it is also home to a number of athletically competitive private (mainly Catholic) high schools such as Marquette University High School, which has the city's only WIAA sanctioned ice hockey team.

While the City Conference schools are quite competitive in basketball, track & field and other sports with low costs of maintenance, it has been noted that the schools' collective lack of funds and facilities puts it at a distinct disadvantage in sports such as football. Problems such as only four of the schools having on-campus stadiums are believed to be a major reason why City Conference schools have been absent from the WIAA State Championship Game since 1986 (a 28-20 Bradley Tech loss to Manitowoc). As a result, many of the city's more talented prep football players either attend private schools on scholarships and vouchers, or suburban schools through school choice programs such as Chapter 220.

The City Conference is considered to be the toughest league in Wisconsin for boys' basketball. Its teams have appeared in 21 of the past 24 WIAA Division 1 Championship Games, winning the title in 14 of them.

City Conference Alumni include Michael Bennett (Football, Track & Field/Bradley Tech), "Downtown" Freddie Brown (Basketball/Lincoln), Terry Porter (Basketball/South Division) and Latrell Sprewell (Basketball/Washington).

=== Amateur/Semi-professional ===
Club	Sport	Founded	Current league	Stadium
Croatian Eagles Soccer Club	Soccer	1922	Premier League of America	Croatian Park
Bavarian United SC	Soccer	1929	USL League Two	Heartland Value Fund Stadium
Milwaukee Bombers	Australian Rules Football	1994	Mid American Australian Football League	Brown Deer Park
Milwaukee Rugby - The Barbarians	Rugby Union	2012	Midwest RFU	Zablocki Park
Milwaukee Torrent	Soccer	2015	National Premier Soccer League	Hart Park

The Milwaukee Bavarians/Bavarian Soccer Club is one of the oldest and most successful amateur soccer clubs in the United States, having captured the National Amateur Cup on two occasions. They play at the fourth level of the American Soccer Pyramid.

The Croatian Eagles Soccer Club are the oldest soccer club in North America, founded in 1922.

== Other ==
=== Auto Racing ===
The Milwaukee suburb of West Allis is home to the Milwaukee Mile auto racing facility, the world's oldest active auto race track, located on the Wisconsin State Fair Grounds. The track has held events sanctioned by major sanctioning bodies, such as the American Automobile Association, USAC, NASCAR, Champ Car World Series (or CART), and the IndyCar Series. An ARCA event was hosted in 2021 and has been a recurring event since 2023. In 2023, the NASCAR Craftsman Truck Series returned to the track with the 2023 Clean Harbors 175. IndyCar hosted a double header weekend event in 2024

=== Speed-Skating ===
Milwaukee is also home to the Pettit National Ice Center, a U.S. Olympic Team training facility, which has been the training site for gold medal-winning speedskaters such as Dan Jansen, Bonnie Blair and Shani Davis.

=== Pro Wrestling ===
Milwaukee was a stronghold of the American Wrestling Association (AWA) during pro wrestling's territorial days. Shows run from The MECCA (Auditorium and Arena) drew large crowds of people who came to see the tag team of former Green Bay Packers lineman Dick "The Bruiser" Afflis and South Milwaukee native Reggie "The Crusher" Lisowski.

Vince McMahon's WWF (later known as World Wrestling Entertainment; now known as WWE) began running shows from The MECCA in the late 1980s leading to Milwaukee being home to some important moments in that promotion's history. Most famously, it is the birthplace of Stone Cold Steve Austin's "Austin 3:16" catchphrase. WWE continues to run shows (including pay-per-views) in Milwaukee at the BMO Harris Bradley Center and will likely run future shows at the new Fiserv Forum once it opens.

Insane Championship Wrestling, a member of the National Wrestling Alliance, also runs shows at smaller venues in the city, usually once a month.

=== Roller Derby ===
A recent addition to Milwaukee's sports scene is Women's Roller Derby. Since 2005 Milwaukee has been home to the Brew City Bruisers, a Women's Flat Track Derby Association (WFTDA) Roller Derby league. The league has four skater-owned and operated teams: Crazy Eights, Maiden Milwaukee, Rushin' Rollettes, and Shevil Knevils. The teams compete in events locally at the US Cellular Arena, and the BCB's Travel Team competes in national league events throughout the United States.

=== Running ===
Milwaukee is home to a variety of competitive road running events. The largest is Al's Run, an annual fund-raiser for the Children's Hospital of Wisconsin run in honor of Al McGuire. The race draws large numbers of the participants, regularly exceeding 15,000.

The city is also the finishing point for the Lakefront Marathon, which begins in Grafton, Wisconsin and is run along Lake Michigan until the finish at Milwaukee's Veterans Park. The Guinness World Record for “most people linked together to complete a marathon” with 62 roped-together runners, was set at Milwaukee's 2011 Lakefront Marathon. Team Jennipede competed on behalf of elite marathoner Jenny Crain, raising over $116,000 for Crain's rehabilitation from injuries suffered when a car hit her during a training run in Milwaukee street on Aug. 27, 2007.

In addition, many paths have been paved in recent years for runners and joggers in the city's parks along Lake Michigan as well as the Hank Aaron State Trail, adjacent to American Family Field in the Menomonee Valley.

== Past teams ==
Previously, numerous other teams have played in Milwaukee, including:

Club	Sport	Played from	League	Stadium
Cream Citys	Baseball	1878	National League	
Milwaukee Unions	Baseball	1884	Union Association	
Milwaukee Brewers	Baseball	1888–1901	Western League/American League	Lloyd Street Grounds
Milwaukee Brewers (1891)	Baseball	1891	American Association (19th century)	
Milwaukee Brewers	Baseball	1902–1952	American Association	Borchert Field
Milwaukee Badgers	Football	1922–1926	NFL	
Milwaukee Bears	Baseball	1923	Negro National League	Borchert Field
Milwaukee Chiefs	Football	1940–1941	American Football League	Dairy Bowl
Milwaukee Chicks	Women's baseball	1944	All-American Girls Professional Baseball League	Borchert Field
Milwaukee Clarks	Ice Hockey	1948–1950	IHL 1948-1949 EIHL1949–1950	UW–Milwaukee Panther Arena formally MCCA Arena
Milwaukee Hawks	Basketball	1951–1955	NBA	Milwaukee Arena (now UW–Milwaukee Panther Arena)
Milwaukee Chiefs	Ice hockey	1952–1954	International Hockey League	
Milwaukee Braves	Baseball	1953–1965	MLB	Milwaukee County Stadium
Milwaukee Does	Women's basketball	1978–1980	WBL	MECCA Arena (now UW–Milwaukee Panther Arena)
Milwaukee Mustangs (1994-2001)	Arena football	1994–2001	Arena Football League	Bradley Center (now BMO Harris Bradley Center)
Milwaukee Rampage	Soccer	1994–2002	USL First Division	
Milwaukee Wave United	Soccer	2003–2004	USL First Division	
Milwaukee Bonecrushers	Arena football	2008–2009	Continental Indoor Football League	U.S. Cellular Arena (now UW–Milwaukee Panther Arena)
Milwaukee Iron	Arena football	2009–2012	Arena Football League	Bradley Center
Milwaukee Copper Hearth	Softball	1977	APSPL	Wilson Stadium, Milwaukee
Milwaukee Schlitz	Softball	1978-1982	APSPL, NASL, UPSPL	Wilson Stadium, Milwaukee

The early 20th century Milwaukee Brewers's time in the American League predates the league's evolution into a major league, going back to the 19th century to its predecessors, the Western Association and Western League. The minor league Milwaukee Brewers was not directly connected to the older team. In fact, there was concern at the time about the prospect of both teams simultaneously playing in 1901 or 1902. The 19th century baseball teams in Milwaukee were interchangeably referred to as the Cream Citys, Milwaukee Brewers, Milwaukee Greys or Milwaukee Unions. This was common during the time as most teams did not have official names and rather adopted names which reporters assigned to them. The table lists the most common name used for each particular team.

The Milwaukee Braves won the National League pennant in 1957 and 1958, and won the World Series in 1957.

Milwaukee is the only major-league city that was never home to a North American Soccer League franchise. However, Milwaukee County Stadium was host to a number of exhibition games of the Chicago Sting, which had planned a permanent move (that never materialized) to the ballpark.. The city has since proven itself to be a viable soccer market, as the Wave were founded in 1984 (the same year the NASL folded) and have been active ever since.

=== Green Bay Packers in Milwaukee ===
The Green Bay Packers played a portion of their home schedule in Milwaukee on a regular basis from the 1930s until 1994 in the following locations:

- Borchert Field, 1933
- Wisconsin State Fair Park, 1934–51
- Marquette Stadium, 1952
- Milwaukee County Stadium, 1953–1994

The first Milwaukee game was played on December 3, 1922, against the Racine Legion. The 1939 Championship between the Packers and the New York Giants was played at State Fair Park in what is currently known as the Milwaukee Mile. The Packers won, 27–0. A 1931 championship against the Portsmouth Spartans was also scheduled for Milwaukee, but was called off. The Packers final post-season game in Milwaukee was a 1967 divisional playoff against the Los Angeles Rams which the Packers won convincingly 28–7. They went on to capture their last NFL Championship and Super Bowl victory under Vince Lombardi.

The Packers played their final game at County Stadium on December 18, 1994, against the Atlanta Falcons. Although the Packers no longer play in Milwaukee, many residents still consider them a Milwaukee team, held in higher regard than the Bucks and Brewers. In spite of no longer playing games in the city, the Packers flagship newspaper and radio have remained the Milwaukee Journal Sentinel and Milwaukee-based WTMJ-AM, respectively.

The Packers maintain two separate season ticket plans, reflecting their time spent in Milwaukee: Gold package holders, made up largely of former Milwaukee season ticket holders, have a three-game package consisting of the annual Midwest Shrine preseason contest plus the second and fifth regular-season home games each year; Green package holders (made up of original Green Bay ticket holders) attend the annual Bishop's Charities preseason game and the remaining six regular-season contests.

== See also ==
- List of baseball parks in Milwaukee
