= Grand Rapids FC =

Association football team

- Full name: Grand Rapids Football Club
- Nicknames: The Blues, GRFC
- Founded: 2014
- Dissolved: 2021
- Website: http://www.grandrapidsfc.com/
| Home colors | Away colors |

Grand Rapids FC was an American soccer club based in Grand Rapids, Michigan, whose senior men's team played in USL League Two. The team was founded in 2014 and ceased operations in 2021. Its first season was in 2015. It was initially funded by a group of supporters who purchased memberships to cover the operating expenses, as well as by local sponsors.

== History ==
Grand Rapids FC (GRFC) was started by a group of Grand Rapids residents as a community-funded project along the lines of Nashville FC. Fundraising began on February 14, 2014, by word of mouth and was opened to the public a month later. The team applied to the National Premier Soccer League for the 2015 season but their application was denied. Instead, GRFC and AFC Ann Arbor (also denied an NPSL bid in 2015) founded the Great Lakes Premier League. The new league held its inaugural meeting on January 17, 2015, with six teams.

Following a 2015 season in which GRFC finished in second place, averaging 4,509 fans per game, the team announced on September 25, 2015, that they would leave the Great Lakes Premier League to join the National Premier Soccer League.

The 2016 season resulted in a first-place position in the NPSL Great Lakes West conference and qualification for the playoffs by beating AFC Ann Arbor in a 3–1 victory in front of a club record 6,854 spectators. The club reached the final of the NPSL Midwest Regional playoffs and beat Indy Eleven NPSL in front of a record attendance of 6,912, qualifying the team for the 2017 US Open Cup. The following day GRFC lost against 2016 NPSL champions AFC Cleveland on penalties.

On November 1, 2016, the club announced they would add a women's team under the same GRFC banner, which would begin play in 2017 in a new Midwest division of the United Women's Soccer league. The women's team plays at Grandville High School in Grandville, Michigan. The Grand Rapids FC (women) won the 2017 United Women's Soccer Championship in their inaugural season.

On December 5, 2019 it was announced that the club would be moving from the NPSL to USL League Two. Also during this time, the ownership of the women's side was transferred to Midwest United FC and their name was changed to reflect this change.

Grand Rapids FC ceased operations on October 27, 2021. The club cited that the lack of an adequate home venue and the financial challenges brought on by the COVID-19 pandemic forced the closure of the club.

== Colors and badge ==
On March 14, 2014, representatives of the club released their vision for the official club logo and colors. The badge draws inspiration from the early German influence in Grand Rapids' brewing, notably Christoph Kusterer, as well as city design. The combination of royal and navy blue reflects a continuity with West Michigan sports teams and various Grand Rapids imagery.

== Stadium ==
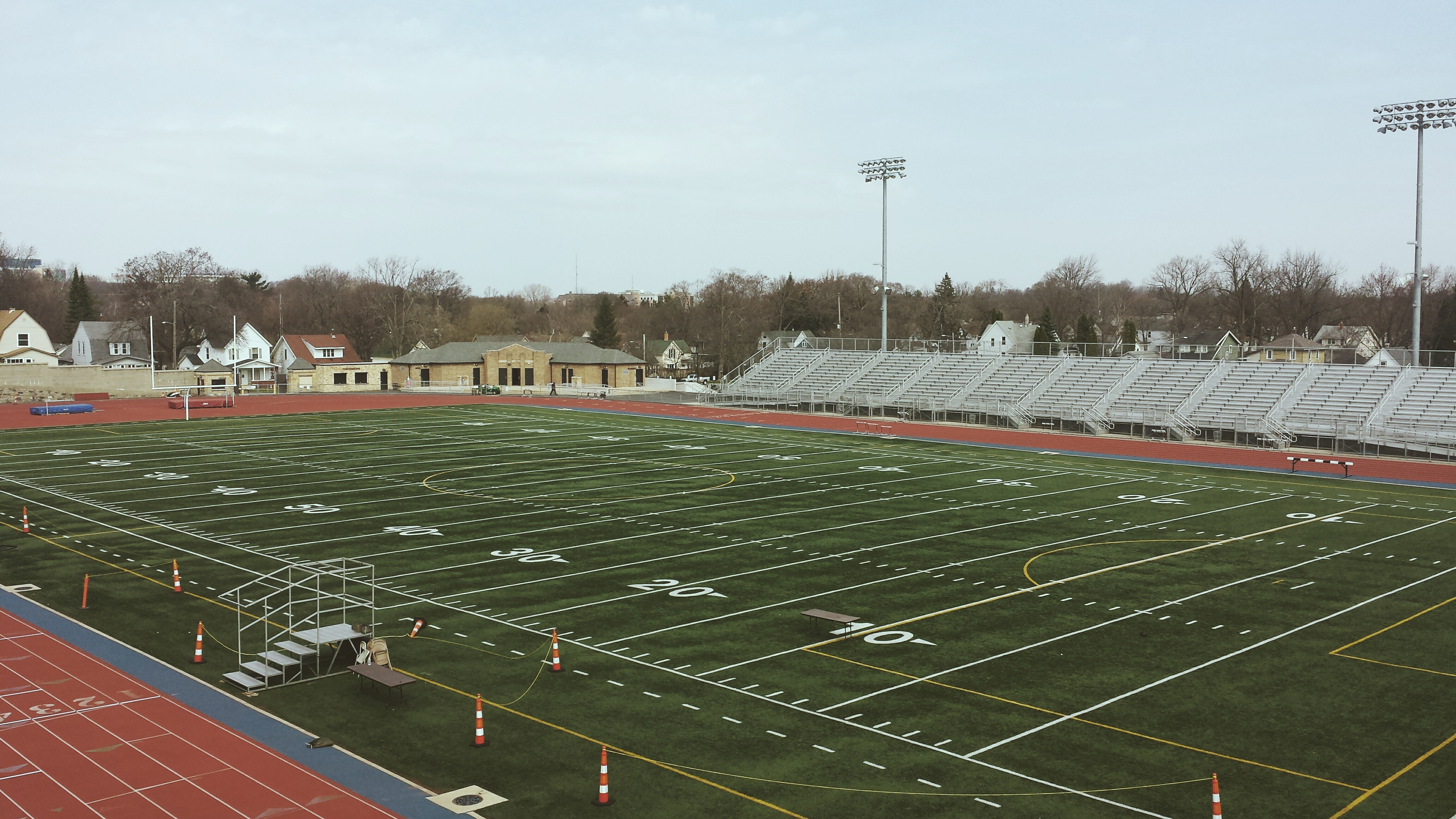
Houseman Field

In 2020 and 2021, Grand Rapids FC had used the Midwest United FC Soccer Complex as their home field. Prior to 2020, Houseman Field in the Midtown neighborhood of Grand Rapids had been the home field since the club's inception.

=== Record attendance ===
- 6,912 – July 22, 2016, vs Indy Eleven NPSL at Houseman Field (second game of a doubleheader, attendance counted both games)
- 6,854 – July 8, 2016, vs AFC Ann Arbor at Houseman Field (single game record)

== Head coaches ==
- (Albania) George Moni (2015–2017)
- (England) Lewis Robinson (2018–2019)
- (England) James Gilpin (2020)
- (Republic of Ireland) Stuart Collins (2021)

== Honors ==
National Premier Soccer League

- Conference championships (1)
  - Midwest Region – Great Lakes West Conference: 2016

Minor competitions

- West Michigan Community Cup: 2020

== Statistics ==
=== Year-by-year ===
| Year | Tier | League | Regular season | Playoffs | U.S. Open Cup | Average Attendance | Average League Attendance |
|---|---|---|---|---|---|---|---|
| 2015 | 5 | GLPL | 2nd of 5 (3–3–2) | ― | Ineligible | 4,509 | 3,945 |
| 2016 | 4 | NPSL | 1st of 7, Midwest – Great Lakes West (7–1–4) | Regional final | Ineligible | 4,315 | 4,784 |
| 2017 | 4 | NPSL | 3rd of 8, Midwest – Great Lakes (6–6–2) | DNQ | First round | 2,691 | 2,588 |
| 2018 | 4 | NPSL | 2nd of 7, Midwest – Great Lakes (7–3–2) | Regional first round | DNQ | ― | ― |
| 2019 | 4 | NPSL | 3rd of 8, Midwest – Great Lakes (9–3–2) | DNQ | DNQ | ― | ― |
| 2020 | 4 | USL2 | Canceled due to COVID-19 pandemic | | | | |
| 2021 | 4 | USL2 | 4th of 9, Central – Great Lakes (7–2–5) | DNQ | DNQ | ― | ― |

1. ^{A} No playoffs were held in the inaugural season of the Great Lakes Premier League.
2. ^{B} To enter the U.S. Open Cup, in the previous season a team must have belonged to an affiliated league with at least 4 teams that played a schedule of at least 10 games.
3. ^{C} Attendance figures beyond the 2017 season have not been made public by the organization.

== Historic record vs opponents ==
Legend
| 0–0–0 | Win–loss-draw |
| 0–0 | Win–loss |
| * | No games played |

| Opponent | League | Playoffs | U.S. Open | Amateur Cup | MI Cup | Played | Total | GF | GA | GD | Win % |
|---|---|---|---|---|---|---|---|---|---|---|---|
| (Michigan) AAFC Lumberjacks | * | * | * | * | 1–0 | 1 | 1–0–0 | 3 | 0 | +3 | 1.000 |
| (Michigan) AFC Ann Arbor | 4–5–1 | * | * | * | * | 10 | 4–5–1 | 15 | 13 | +2 | .450 |
| (Ohio) AFC Cleveland | * | 0–0–1 (0–1 PKs) | * | * | * | 1 | 0–0–1 | 0 | 0 | 0 | .500 |
| (Michigan) Ann Arbor FC | * | * | * | 1–0 | * | 1 | 1–0–0 | 4 | 1 | +3 | 1.000 |
| (Illinois) Chicago FC United | * | * | 0–1 | * | * | 1 | 0–1–0 | 0 | 1 | −1 | .000 |
| (Wisconsin) Croatian Eagles | 1–0–1 | * | * | * | * | 2 | 1–0–1 | 3 | 1 | +2 | .750 |
| (Ohio) Dayton Dutch Lions | 1–0–0 | * | * | * | * | 1 | 1–0–0 | 6 | 1 | +5 | 1.000 |
| (Ohio) Dayton Dynamo | 2–0–0 | * | * | * | * | 2 | 2–0–0 | 2 | 0 | +2 | 1.000 |
| (Michigan) Detroit City FC | 2–2–4 | * | * | * | * | 8 | 2–2–4 | 13 | 12 | +1 | .500 |
| (Minnesota) Duluth FC | * | 0–0–1 (0–1 PKs) | * | * | * | 1 | 0–0–1 | 2 | 2 | 0 | .500 |
| (Ohio) FC Columbus | 1–3–0 | * | * | * | * | 4 | 1–3–0 | 3 | 8 | −5 | .250 |
| FC Indiana | 6–0–0 | * | * | * | * | 6 | 6–0–0 | 26 | 2 | +24 | 1.000 |
| (Michigan) Flint City Bucks | 1–0–1 | * | * | * | 0–1 | 3 | 1–1–1 | 4 | 4 | 0 | .500 |
| (Indiana) Fort Wayne FC | 0–0–2 | * | * | * | * | 2 | 0–0–2 | 1 | 1 | 0 | .500 |
| (Indiana) Indy Eleven NPSL | * | 1–0 | * | * | * | 1 | 1–0–0 | 1 | 0 | +1 | 1.000 |
| (Michigan) Kalamazoo FC | 6–2–2 | * | * | * | * | 10 | 6–2–2 | 20 | 10 | +10 | .700 |
| (Ohio) Kings Hammer FC | 0–1–0 | * | * | * | * | 1 | 0–1–0 | 2 | 3 | –1 | .000 |
| (Michigan) Lansing United | 2–1–1 | * | * | * | 0–0–1 (0–1 PKs) | 5 | 2–1–2 | 9 | 7 | +2 | .600 |
| (Michigan) Livonia City FC | * | * | * | 0–1 | * | 1 | 0–1–0 | 0 | 1 | –1 | .000 |
| Michigan Stars FC | 3–1–2 | * | * | * | * | 6 | 3–1–2 | 7 | 5 | +2 | .667 |
| (Wisconsin) Milwaukee Torrent | 2–0–2 | * | * | * | * | 4 | 2–0–2 | 7 | 5 | +2 | .750 |
| (Michigan) Muskegon Risers SC | * | * | * | * | 2–0 | 2 | 2–0–0 | 5 | 3 | +2 | 1.000 |
| (Michigan) Oakland County FC | 3–1–0 | * | * | * | * | 4 | 3–1–0 | 10 | 4 | +6 | .750 |
| (Illinois) RWB Adria | 0–2–0 | * | * | * | * | 2 | 0–2–0 | 2 | 6 | −4 | .000 |
| (Indiana) South Bend Lions FC | 1–0–1 | * | * | * | * | 2 | 1–0–1 | 4 | 3 | +1 | .750 |
| (Ohio) Toledo Villa FC | 4–0–0 | * | * | * | * | 4 | 4–0–0 | 17 | 3 | +14 | 1.000 |
| Total | 39–18–17 | 1–0–2 (0–2 PKs) | 0–1 | 1–1 | 3–1–1 (0–1 PKs) | 85 | 44–21–20 | 166 | 96 | +70 | .635 |

- Note: Table includes all competitive matches and does not include friendlies.
- Updated to end of 2021 season.
1. ^{D} Livonia City FC forfeited this May 4, 2019 match due to fielding an ineligible player. Grand Rapids FC was subsequently disqualified from the 2019 Amateur Cup for fielding too many players in the competition.
2. ^{E} Oakland United were renamed Oakland County FC in 2016

== Player records ==
=== Goals ===
| Rank | Player | Goals | Years |
|---|---|---|---|
| 1 | (New Zealand) Scott Doney | 15 | 2016–2020 |
| 2 | (Republic of Ireland) Matt Whelan | 10 | 2018–2020 |
| 2 | (England) Matty Cornish | 10 | 2021 |
| 4 | (United States) Noble Sullivan | 7 | 2015–2018 |
| 4 | (United States) Jalen Rodríguez | 7 | 2017–2019 |
| 4 | (United States) Caleb Postlewait | 7 | 2017–2019 |
| 4 | (Germany) Samuel Biek | 7 | 2019 |
| 4 | (Nigeria) TJ Ifaturoti | 7 | 2019, 2021 |
| 9 | (United States) Anthony Bowie | 6 | 2016–2020 |
| 10 | (United States) Greg Timmer | 5 | 2016–2017, 2019–2020 |
| 10 | (United States) Joe Broekhuizen | 5 | 2016–2020 |
| 10 | (United States) Eric Conerty | 5 | 2018–2021 |

=== Appearances ===
| Rank | Player | Apps | Years |
|---|---|---|---|
| 1 | (New Zealand) Scott Doney | 50 | 2016–2020 |
| 2 | (England) Tony Deakin | 44 | 2015–2018, 2020–2021 |
| 3 | (United States) Noah Fazekas | 42 | 2016–2018 |
| 4 | (Republic of Ireland) Jack McCarren | 40 | 2018–2021 |
| 5 | (United States) Caleb Postlewait | 35 | 2017–2019 |
| 6 | (United States) Nick Abdoo | 34 | 2015–2018 |
| 6 | (United States) Eric Conerty | 34 | 2018–2021 |
| 8 | (United States) Jake VanderLaan | 31 | 2016–2020 |
| 9 | (United States) Noble Sullivan | 30 | 2015–2018 |
| 9 | (United States) Anthony Bowie | 30 | 2016–2020 |
| 9 | (United States) Joe Broekhuizen | 30 | 2016–2020 |
| 9 | (Republic of Ireland) Daire O'Riordan | 30 | 2018–2020 |

- Note: Table includes all competitive matches and does not include friendlies.
- Updated to end of 2021 season.

== Club culture ==
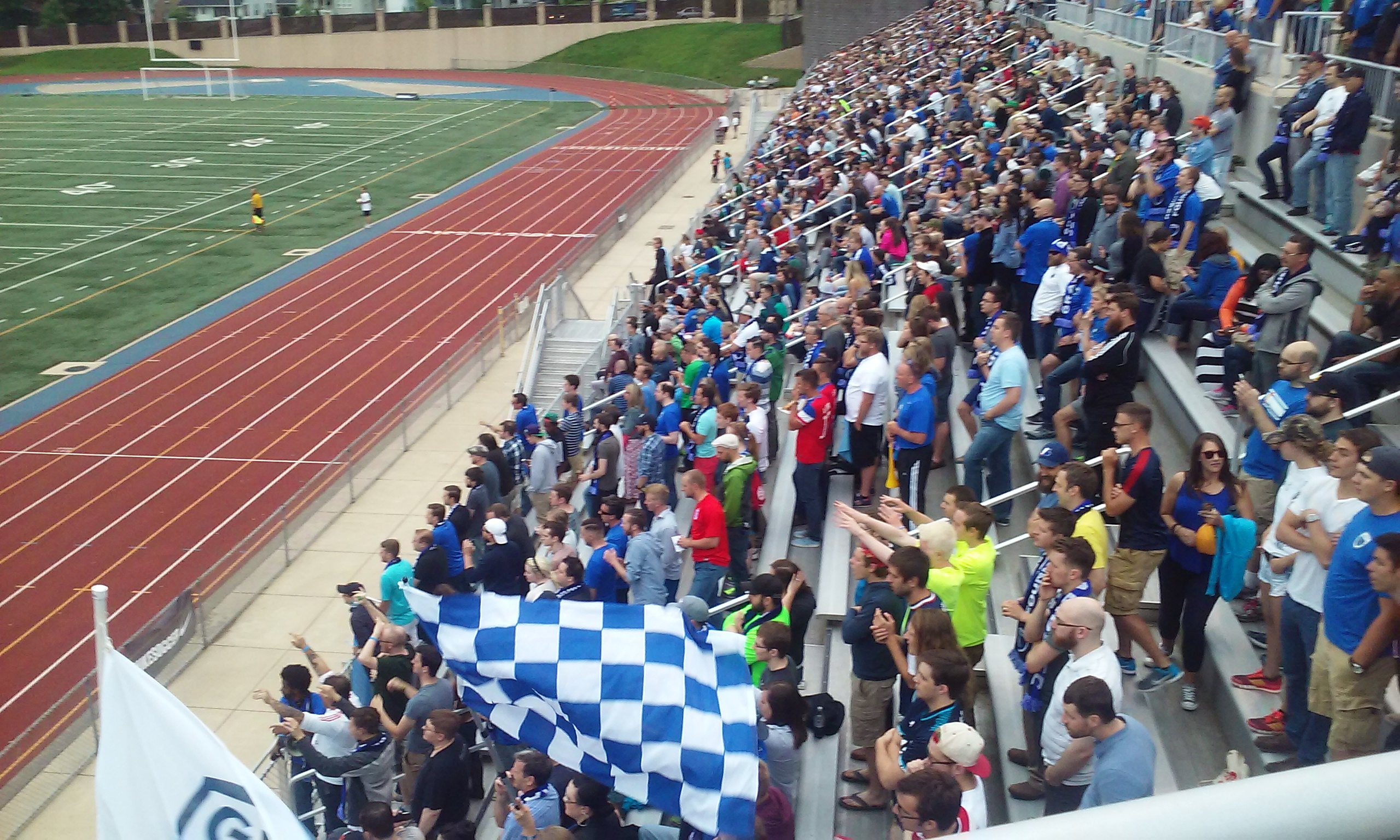
The south side of Houseman Field, with members of the Grand Army supporters group in the foreground. Attendance 3,843.

=== Supporters ===
The Grand Army was the supporters group for Grand Rapids FC. Starting in 2015, all pre-game festivities were held at Bob's Bar and a march led through the Midtown neighborhood. In June 2015 a fanzine entitled What if it Rains started publication. The name of the magazine referred to one of the reasons the NPSL originally declined the club's application and celebrated the club's massive support.
