= Minneapolis City SC =

American soccer club

- Full name: Minneapolis City Soccer Club
- Nickname: The Crows
- Founded: 2016; 10 years ago
- Stadium: Edor Nelson Field, Augsburg University
- Capacity: 1,500
- Chairman: Dan Hoedeman
- Head coach: Jon Forsythe
- League: USL League Two
- 2026: 1st, Heartland Division; Playoffs: Conference Semifinal
- Website: mplscitysc.com
| Home colors | Away colors |

Minneapolis City Soccer Club (known informally as Mpls City SC or The Crows) is an American soccer club based in Minneapolis, Minnesota, United States. Founded in 2016, the team plays in the USL League Two, the top national league at the fourth tier of the American Soccer Pyramid. The club won three straight NPSL North Conference championships (2018, 2019 and 2021) before joining League Two. Their nickname is The Crows, coined by the club's supporters, which comes from the "Mega Murder" of crows that roost in Minneapolis.

== History ==
Founded in 2016 as an offshoot of Stegman's Soccer Club, team managing director Dan Hoedeman stated that his goal with the team is to re-create the local feeling of the Minnesota Thunder's early days. As such, every player is a Minnesota resident and the team is owned by "members" who make important decisions for the team, such as the league, colors, logo and budget.

In their inaugural 2016 season in the Premier League of America, the team finished at three wins, four draws and three losses, good for third place in the league's West Division. Their first competitive game was a scoreless draw against Bavarian SC in Milwaukee. The club's first goal was scored by Matthew Gweh in their first home match, a 2–1 win over Croatian Eagles at Les Barnard Field.

That October, they would win their first qualifying match for the 2017 Lamar Hunt U.S. Open Cup, defeating league-mates Oakland County FC by a score of 2–1 in extra time.

In 2017 Minneapolis City SC announced it was joining the National Premier Soccer League. The team was a member of the North Conference in the Midwest Region from 2017 to 2022.

With the win over Oakland County FC, Minneapolis City became the first amateur team from Minnesota to qualify for the U.S. Open Cup proper, but were disqualified from the tournament for switching leagues.

In 2018, Minneapolis City SC clinched the NPSL North Conference title while going undefeated in conference play, one of only five teams in the NPSL to remain unbeaten in the regular season. Additionally, the Crows were the top offensive team in the entire league with 46 goals scored.

They followed that up with the 2019 NPSL North Conference title. Interestingly, after beating Duluth FC 4–2 in the second-to-last match of the season to clinch the 2018 title, the Crows went to Duluth and beat them 4–2 in the second-to-last match of the season to clinch the 2019 title as well.

The 2020 season was cancelled because of COVID so it took until 2021 for the Crows to win their third-straight NPSL North Conference title, which they did in style by beating rival Duluth FC 6–1 in Duluth to secure the title with two games still to play. It was the third season in a row that the Crows beat Duluth to win the conference. In the playoffs, the Crows went on to the Midwest Region Final where they fell to Cleveland SC 2–0.

In September 2021, the team announced that it would join USL League Two for the 2022 season.

After a difficult first few years in USL League Two, Minneapolis City found success in 2025. The Crows won the Heartland Division, beating Sueno FC 4–2 to pip the Chicago side to the title on goal difference. City then went on a playoff run, beating Peoria City and Sueno again, before eventually losing to Flint City Bucks in the Midwest Conference Final at Interbay Stadium in Seattle. The next day, the Crows' second team won the Minnesota Super Cup in St. Paul by defeating old NPSL rival Duluth FC 2 - 0 in the final.

== Club culture ==
Called a "ramshackle, DIY soccer club" by The Growler, and not unfairly as the club has embraced that ethos both as a way to harken back to the original days of pro soccer in Minnesota and as a way to create a "people-driven alternative to corporate pro sports".

Minneapolis City launched a "throwback" style logo and kit before ever playing a game. The kit and logo were designed by designer Matthew Wolff, from Minneapolis, whose credits include the branding for Los Angeles FC, New York City FC, and others.

=== Supporters ===
Minneapolis City is a well-supported club at its level, in large part because of the Citizens supporter's group.

The Citizens are known for organizing tifos and for their in-game heckling during Crows games.

=== Affiliates ===
Stegman's Soccer Club is an amateur soccer club based in Minneapolis. The club fields five competitive amateur men's teams across the two major summer leagues in Minneapolis-St Paul: Stegman's 1977, Stegman's Old Boys, and Stegman's Athletic in the Minnesota Amateur Soccer League (MASL), Stegman's United and Stegman's Blues in the Minnesota Recreational Soccer League (MRSL), and various small-sided teams in various other leagues throughout the year.

In 2021, Minneapolis City created the Minneapolis City Futures Program, a supplementary training program for local players under the age of 20, to bridge the gap between youth and adult soccer in the area. In 2024, the Futures Program expanded to include both a U-21 and a U-19 team. The U-19 team were the 2024 UPSL Division 1 champions.

=== Rivalries ===
Though not technically a derby, matches between Minneapolis City SC and Duluth FC are important to supporters and, while City was in the NPSL, were important to the conference title race. The famous 'donkey tifo' of 2017 helped give Duluth FC the nickname "The Donkeys."

The City-Suburbs Derby was contested over the years with Minnesota TwinStars, who typically play in the northern suburbs of Minneapolis. As with any local derby, the games were hotly contested and rife with chicanery and "technical difficulties".

Starting in 2022, Stillwater-based St. Croix SC joined USL League Two and the Twin Cities Derby commenced. Tightly contested on the field, the derby hasn't yet acquired broader significance or traction with supporters.

== Players ==
=== Roster ===
Note: Flags indicate national team as defined under FIFA eligibility rules; some limited exceptions apply. Players may hold more than one non-FIFA nationality. Squad correct as of February 3, 2025.

| No. | Pos. | Nation | Player |
|---|---|---|---|
| 0 | GK | USA | Jack Roach |
| 1 | GK | USA | Daniel Sessler |
| 2 | MF | USA | Jake Swallen |
| 3 | DF | CAN | Dubem Obilo |
| 5 | DF | USA | Jared Hecht |
| 6 | MF | CAN | Jeloni Murray-Powell |
| 7 | MF | USA | Will Schmidt |
| 8 | MF | USA | Alexis Moreno |
| 9 | FW | USA | Nathan Donovan |
| 10 | FW | CRC | Hakeem Morgan |
| 11 | FW | USA | Julian Banks |
| 12 | DF | USA | Jack Dancer |
| 13 | GK | GER | Moritz Krenc |
| 14 | FW | USA | Landon Benge |
| 15 | DF | MAR | Islam Houssni |

| No. | Pos. | Nation | Player |
|---|---|---|---|
| 16 | DF | USA | Rayme Nyembwe |
| 17 | FW | USA | Shea Bechtel |
| 18 | MF | USA | Baraka Tarleton |
| 19 | FW | USA | Masango Akale |
| 20 | DF | USA | Curtis Wagner |
| 21 | FW | USA | Caleb Capone |
| 23 | MF | USA | Arien van Mol |
| 24 | DF | USA | Nick Kent |
| 25 | MF | USA | Joe Swallen |
| 26 | MF | USA | Elijah Fearing |
| 27 | MF | USA | Phil Caputo |
| 28 | MF | USA | Ronan Selbo |
| 29 | FW | USA | Aleks Pituch |
| 30 | MF | USA | Morgan Olson |

=== Notable players ===
Minneapolis City players who have been drafted in the MLS SuperDraft include Brandon Bye (New England Revolution), Luke Haakenson (Nashville SC), Xavier Zengue (Columbus Crew), Herbert Endeley (FC Dallas), Rory O'Driscoll (Nashville SC), and Joe Highfield (Houston Dynamo).

Minneapolis City players who went on to play at professional level include Brandon Bye (New England Revolution), Luke Haakenson (Nashville SC), Herbert Endeley (FC Dallas), Loïc Mesanvi (Minnesota United), Rory O'Driscoll (Las Vegas Lights), Xavier Zengue (Lexington SC), Scotty Heinen (Germania Eicherscheid), Matt Gibbons (Germania Eicherscheid), Ian Smith (Oppsal IF), Jakob Popkin (AC Syracuse Pulse), Mitch Wolff (Stumptown FC), Juan Louis (Chattanooga FC), Abbai Habte (Nordvärmlands FF), Miles Stockman-Willis (Vrigstad IF), Andy Lorei (San Diego Sockers), and Jake Swallen (Sporting Kansas City II).

Additionally, former Minnesota United player Brian Kallman turned out for the Crows in the 2017 season.

== Technical staff ==
- (United States) Jon Forsythe – Head Coach
- (United States) Mark Yueill – Associate Head Coach
- (United States) Martin Sanchez – Goalkeeper Coach
- (United States) Casey Holm - Sporting Director
- (United States) Matt vanBenschoten - General Manager

== Statistics ==
=== Season-by-season ===
| Season | Division | League | Wins | Draw | Losses | Regular season | Playoffs | Open Cup |
|---|---|---|---|---|---|---|---|---|
| 2016 | 4 | PLA (Western Conference) | 3 | 4 | 3 | 3rd | Did not qualify | Did not enter |
| 2017 | 4 | NPSL (Midwest Region, North Conference) | 8 | 1 | 5 | 3rd | Did not qualify | 1st Round, Disqualified |
| 2018 | 4 | NPSL (Midwest Region, North Conference) | 10 | 4 | 0 | 1st | Midwest semifinal | 3rd qualifying round |
| 2019 | 4 | NPSL (Midwest Region, North Conference) | 9 | 1 | 2 | 1st | Midwest semifinal | Did not enter |
| 2020 | 4 | NPSL (Midwest Region, North Conference) | - | - | - | cancelled | cancelled | Qualified, cancelled |
| 2021 | 4 | NPSL (Midwest Region, North Conference) | 11 | 0 | 1 | 1st | Midwest final | Qualified, cancelled |
| 2022 | 4 | NPSL (Midwest Region, North Conference) | 7 | 1 | 6 | 4th | Did not qualify | 1st round |
| 2022 | 4 | USL2 (Central Conference, Deep North Division) | 1 | 2 | 9 | 6th | Did not qualify | 1st round |
| 2023 | 4 | USL2 (Central Conference, Deep North Division) | 3 | 3 | 6 | 6th | Did not qualify | Did not qualify |
| 2023 | 4 | Minnesota Super Cup | 1 | 0 | 2 | Semifinal | | |
| 2024 | 4 | USL2 (Central Conference, Deep North Division) | 5 | 0 | 7 | 6th | Did not qualify | Did not qualify |
| 2024 | 4 | Minnesota Super Cup | 2 | 0 | 1 | Final | | |
| 2025 | 4 | USL2 (Central Conference, Heartland Division) | 10 | 2 | 3 | 1st | Conference final | Did not quality |
| 2025 | 4 | Minnesota Super Cup | 2 | 2 | 0 | Champions | | |
| 2026 | 4 | USL2 (Central Conference, Heartland Division) | 13 | 0 | 1 | 1st | Conference Semifinal | Qualified |
| 2026 | 4 | Minnesota Super Cup | 1 | 1 | 1 | Semifinal | | |

=== Historic record vs opponents ===
| Opponent | League Record (W-D-L) | Open Cup Record (W-D-L) | Friendly Record (W-D-L) | Biggest Victory | Biggest Defeat |
|---|---|---|---|---|---|
| Aurora Borealis* | 0-0-0 | 1–0–0 | 0-0-0 | W 3–2 | N/A |
| Cedar Rapids Rampage United* | 0–1–1 | 0-0-0 | 0-0-0 | N/A | L 2–4 |
| Carpathia FC | 1–0–0 | 0-0-0 | 0-0-0 | W 3–0 | N/A |
| Chicago City Dutch Lions | 2–0–0 | 0-0-0 | 0-0-0 | W 4–0 | N/A |
| Cleveland SC | 0–0–1 | 0-0-0 | 0-0-0 | N/A | L 0–2 |
| Croatian Eagles | 1–0–1 | 0-0-0 | 0-0-0 | W 2–1 | L 0–1 |
| Dakota Fusion | 7–0–1 | 0-0-0 | 0-0-0 | W 8–0 | L 2–3 |
| Des Moines Menace | 0-0-2 | 0-0-1 | 0–0–1 | N/A | L 1–4 |
| Des Moines Wanderers* | 0-0-0 | 0-0-0 | 0–1–0 | N/A | N/A |
| Detroit City FC | 0-0-1 | 0-0-0 | 0–0–0 | N/A | L 0–2 |
| Duluth FC | 7–2–4 | 0-0-0 | 0-0-0 | W 6–1 | L 1–2 |
| FC Fargo* | 0-0-0 | 0-0-0 | 1–0–0 | W 6–0 | N/A |
| FC Manitoba | 2-0-2 | 0-0-0 | 0–0–0 | W 2–1 | L 1–4 |
| FC Minneapolis | 0-0-0 | 0-0-0 | 1–0–0 | W 4–1 | N/A |
| Flint City Bucks | 0-0-1 | 0-0-0 | 0–0–0 | N/A | L 1–2 |
| Joy Athletic Club | 3–0–1 | 0-0-0 | 0-0-0 | W 2–0 | L 2–3 |
| LaCrosse Aris FC* | 9–1–0 | 0-0-0 | 0-0-0 | W 8–0 | N/A |
| Madison 56ers* | 1–1–0 | 0-0-0 | 0-0-0 | W 3–2 | N/A |
| Rochester Med City FC* | 6–1–5 | 0-0-0 | 0-0-0 | W 2–0 | L 1–5 |
| Milwaukee Bavarians | 1–2–4 | 0-0-0 | 0-0-0 | W 1–0 | L 0–2 |
| Minnesota TwinStars | 3–1–4 | 0-0-0 | 0-0-0 | W 1–0 | L 0–2 |
| Minnesota United Reserves | 2–2–1 | 0-0-0 | 0-0-0 | W 5–1 | L 0–1 |
| Bugeaters FC* | 0–0–0 | 0-0-0 | 1-0-0 | W 3–2 | N/A |
| Oakland County FC | 0-0-0 | 1–0–0 | 0-0-0 | W 2–1 | N/A |
| Peoria City | 1-1-2 | 0–0–0 | 0-0-0 | W 2-2 (Pen) | L 0–2 |
| River Light FC | 1-1-0 | 0–0–0 | 0-0-0 | W 5–1 | N/A |
| RKC Third Coast | 0-5-2 | 0–0–0 | 0-0-0 | N/A | L 3–5 |
| Rochester FC | 5-1-1 | 0–0–0 | 0-0-0 | W 2–0 | L 1–5 |
| Rochester Lancers | 0-0-0 | 0–0–1 | 0-0-0 | N/A | L 1–2 |
| St. Croix Legends | 4-1-5 | 0-0-0 | 0-0-0 | W 2–0 | L 1–2 |
| Sioux Falls Thunder | 9-1-0 | 0-0-0 | 0-0-0 | W 6–1 | N/A |
| Sueno FC | 2-0-1 | 0-0-0 | 0-0-0 | W 4–2 | L 2–3 |
| Thunder Bay Chill | 2-1-4 | 0–0–0 | 0-0-0 | W 2–1 | L 1–3 |
| Union Dubuque FC* | 0–0–0 | 0-0-0 | 1-0-0 | W 7–0 | N/A |
| Viejos son los Trapos FC* | 4–0–0 | 0-0-0 | 0-0-0 | W 5–1 | N/A |

*Team folded

== Honors ==
=== USL League Two ===
- Regular Season Champions (1): 2026
- Heartland Division Champions (2): 2025, 2026

=== NPSL ===
- Regular Season Champions (1): 2021
- North Conference Champions (3): 2018, 2019, 2021

=== Cups ===
- Minnesota Super Cup Champions (1): 2025
