= MRSL =

MRSL may refer to:

- Minnesota Recreational Soccer League, an adult soccer association, part of the Minnesota Amateur Soccer League
- Salama Airport, in Costa Rica by ICAO code
