= Carlos Contreras (footballer, born 1991) =

Honduran footballer

Personal information
- Date of birth: 6 September 1991 (age 35)
- Place of birth: Comayagua, Honduras
- Height: 1.76 m (5 ft 9 in)
- Position: Midfielder

Youth career
- –2009: St. Croix Red Devils

College career
Years	Team	Apps	(Gls)
2010–2011	UW-Parkside Rangers	31	(2)

Senior career*
Years	Team	Apps	(Gls)
2014	Minnesota United FC Reserves		
2015	Colorado Springs Switchbacks	1	(0)
2016	FC Wichita		
2016–2018	St. Louis Ambush (indoor)	15	(5)
2019–2020	Milwaukee Wave (indoor)	1	(0)
- * Club domestic league appearances and goals as of 18 December 2022

Carlos Contreras (born 6 September 1991) is a Honduran footballer who plays as a midfielder

== Career ==
=== College & Youth ===
Contreras began playing college soccer at University of Wisconsin–Parkside in 2010 and 2011.

After college, Contreras appeared for NPSL side Minnesota United FC Reserves in 2014.

=== Professional ===
Contreras signed with USL club Colorado Springs Switchbacks on 26 January 2015.
