= Premier League of America =

Association football league

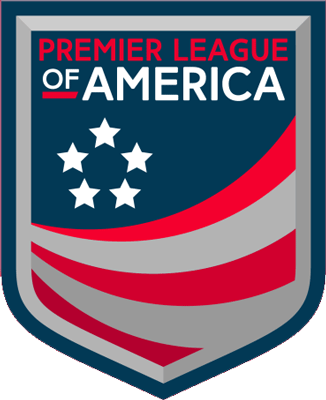
- Founded: 2015 (as Great Lakes Premier League)
- Folded: 2017 (became Midwest Division of UPSL)
- Country: United States
- Confederation: CONCACAF
- Divisions: 2
- Number of clubs: 12
- Domestic cup: Lamar Hunt U.S. Open Cup
- Last champions: Milwaukee Bavarians (2nd title)
- Most championships: Milwaukee Bavarians (2 titles)
- Website: plasoccerleague.com/

The Premier League of America (PLA) was an American soccer league consisting of teams in cities in the Great Lakes region of the United States. The league was a part of the United States Adult Soccer Association. It began its first season of play in 2015 as the Great Lakes Premier League, and at the end of the 2017 season its member clubs moved to form the Midwest Conference of the United Premier Soccer League.

== History ==
original logo

Grand Rapids FC and AFC Ann Arbor both applied to become members of the National Premier Soccer League for the start of the 2015 season and they were both denied admission to the league. Instead of waiting a year or finding another league, the teams decided to start a league of their own. AFC Ann Arbor owner Jamey Amrine and Grand Rapids FC president Matt Roberts began discussions with other teams to gauge interest in forming a new league. Their work led to the formation of the Great Lakes Premier League. The new league held its inaugural league meeting on January 17, 2015, in Grand Rapids, MI.

The two clubs were joined as charter members by Oakland United - later Oakland County FC - based in Rochester, Michigan, and two decades-old Croatian American clubs, Croatian Eagles SC of Milwaukee and RWB Adria of Chicago.

Before the inaugural season began, Milwaukee Bavarians was announced as the first expansion franchise, to begin play in 2016. A second expansion team, Toledo United FC, joined in July 2015.

In September 2015, AFC Ann Arbor and Grand Rapids FC left the GLPL for the NPSL. The following November, the Madison 56ers left the NPSL after eleven seasons to join the Great Lakes Premier League.

The league announced on December 8, 2015, that they would be rebranding as Premier League of America, to more accurately reflect the potential growth of the league away from the Great Lakes area.

Two days later, Carpathia FC of Sterling Heights, Michigan in the Detroit suburbs was added as team number eight. The same month, Aris SC of La Crosse, Wisconsin and Aurora Borealis SC from Aurora, Illinois were added. Aris has since been removed from PLA announcements.

A tenth team was added on January 11, 2016, as Minnesota United FC Reserves moved over from the NPSL. An eleventh team for 2016 was added on January 13, 2016, as Stegman's Soccer Club joined as Minneapolis City SC. After their single season in the PLA, Minneapolis City announced their move to the NPSL.

On August 1, 2016, it was announced that Muskegon Risers SC would join the Premier League of America for the 2017 season after a unanimous 12–0 vote by current team owners.

On September 6, 2017, the United Premier Soccer League announced that eleven of the twelve PLA clubs (all save Grand Rapids Ole SC) had joined its league and would comprise the UPSL's new Midwest Conference.

== Competition format ==
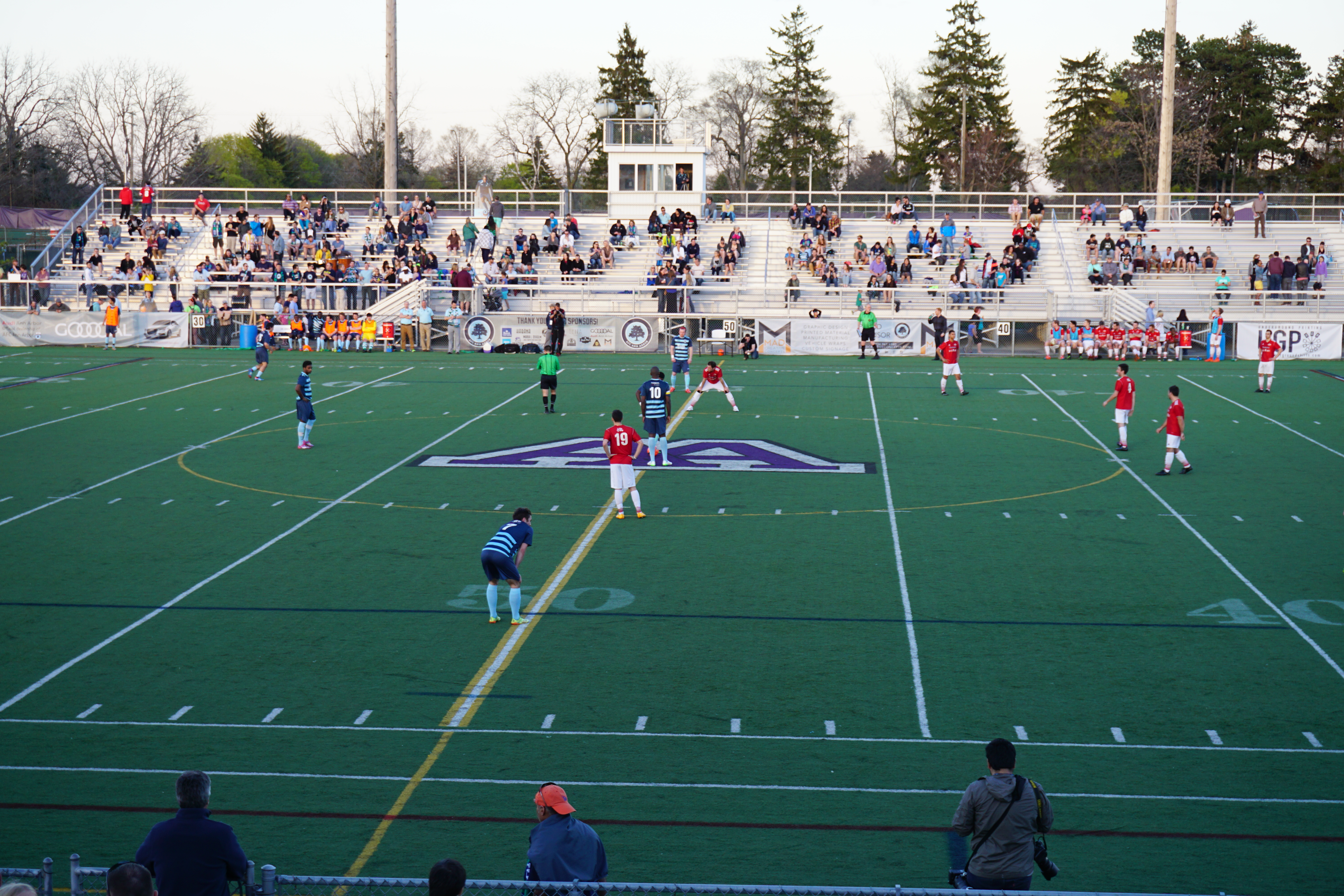
AFC Ann Arbor in action against San Marino Soccer in a 2015 friendly at Hollway Field

In 2015 the league had a schedule that featured round robin play, where each team played every other team home and away. The league did not host a post-season tournament in 2015 and determined its champion based on the final season standings.

As part of the re-branding announcement for 2016, it was announced there would be a two-division geographical split, with an end-of-season championship playoff. The league will host a championship tournament at a neutral site with the top two teams from each division qualifying.

== Teams ==
Team	City	Stadium	Founded	Inaugural Season	Final Season
AFC Ann Arbor	Ann Arbor, Michigan	Hollway Field	2014	2015	2015
Aurora Borealis SC	Aurora, Illinois	Mooseheart School	2016	2016	2017
Carpathia FC	Sterling Heights, Michigan	Carpathia Club	1952	2016	2017
Cedar Rapids Rampage United	Cedar Rapids, Iowa	Clark Field, Coe College (2016); Kingston Stadium (2017)	2015	2016	2017
Croatian Eagles SC	Franklin, Wisconsin	Croatian Park	1922	2015	2017
Elgin Pumas SC	Elgin, Illinois	Judson University	1991	2017	2017
Grand Rapids FC	Grand Rapids, Michigan	Houseman Field	2014	2015	2015
Madison 56ers	Madison, Wisconsin	Breese Stevens Field	1956	2016	2017
Milwaukee Bavarian SC	Glendale, Wisconsin	Heartland Value Fund Stadium	1929	2016	2017
Minneapolis City SC	Minneapolis, Minnesota	Edor Nelson Field	2016	2016	2016
Minnesota United FC Reserves	Woodbury, Minnesota	East Ridge High School	2013	2016	2016
Muskegon Risers SC	Muskegon, Michigan	Kehren Stadium	2014	2017	2017
Oakland County FC	Royal Oak, Michigan	Royal Oak High School	2014^{1}	2015	2017
Ole SC	East Grand Rapids, Michigan	Mehney Field	2006	2016	2017
RWB Adria	River Grove, Illinois	Triton College	1959	2015	2017
Toledo Villa FC	Sylvania, Ohio	Sylvania Northview High School	2017	2017	2017
Toledo United FC	Maumee, Ohio	Springfield High School	2016	2016	2016

- ^{1} as Oakland United
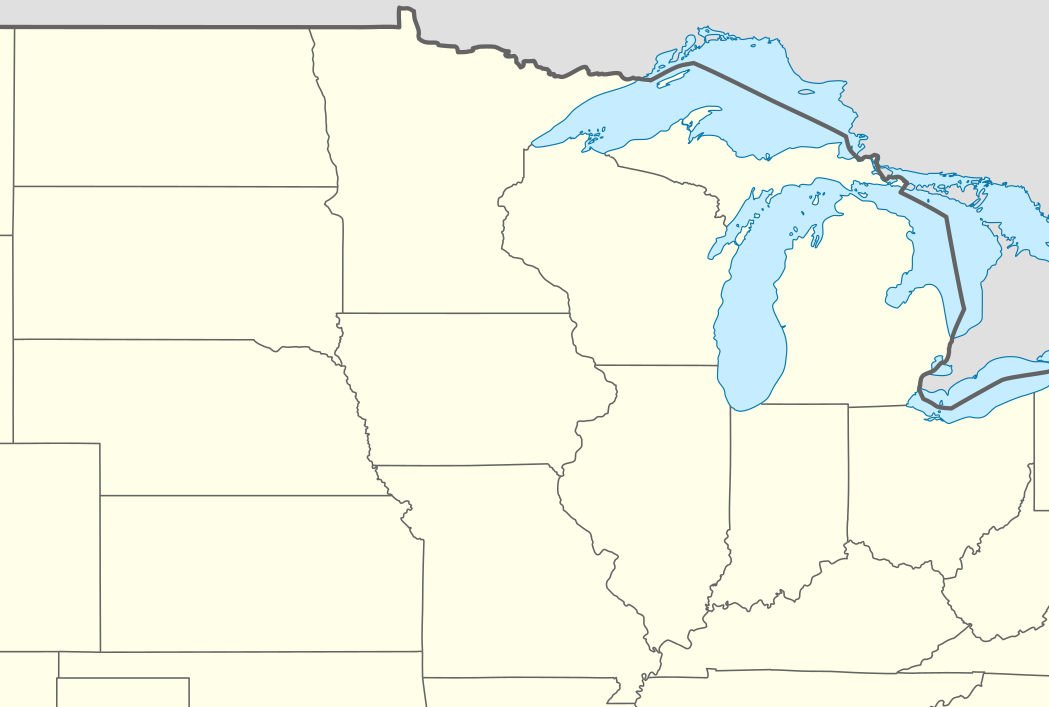
Locations of PLA clubs for 2017 season

=== Expansion ===
Year	# of Teams	Teams Added	Teams Departed
2015	5	5	0
2016	12	9	2
2017	12	3	3

== Champions ==
Season	Champion	Score	Runner-up
2015	RWB Adria		Grand Rapids FC
2016	Milwaukee Bavarians	4 – 2	RWB Adria
2017	Milwaukee Bavarians (2)	5 – 3	Carpathia FC

1. ^{A} No playoffs were held in the inaugural season. The champion was determined based on regular season record.

== 2015 standings ==
Pos	Team	Pld	W	D	L	GF	GA	GD	Pts
1	RWB Adria (C)	8	7	1	0	23	6	+17	22
2	Grand Rapids FC	8	3	2	3	14	10	+4	11
3	AFC Ann Arbor	8	2	4	2	8	8	0	10
4	Oakland United FC	8	2	1	5	8	19	−11	7
5	Croatian Eagles	8	1	2	5	9	19	−10	5

Updated to match(es) played on July 25, 2015. Source: GLPL standings
Rules for classification: 1) points; 2) wins; 3) goal differential
(C) Champions

Home \ Away	ARB	CRE	GRR	OAK	RWB
AFC Ann Arbor	—	1–0	0–0	4–0	1–1
Croatian Eagles	0–0	—	1–3	1–2	3–6
Grand Rapids FC	5–1	0–0	—	3–0	1–3
Oakland United FC	1–1	3–4	2–1	—	0–4
RWB Adria	1–0	4–0	3–1	1–0	—

Updated to match(es) played on July 25, 2015. Source: []
Legend: Blue = home team win; Yellow = draw; Red = away team win.

== 2016 standings and playoffs ==
=== East Division ===
Pos	Team	Pld	W	D	L	GF	GA	GD	Pts	Qualification
1	RWB Adria	10	7	1	2	29	13	+16	22	2016 PLA playoffs
2	Toledo United FC	10	7	1	2	22	7	+15	22	2016 PLA playoffs
3	Carpathia FC	10	6	1	3	17	17	0	19	
4	Oakland County FC	10	4	2	4	14	13	+1	14	
5	Aurora Borealis SC	10	2	1	7	13	25	−12	7	
6	Ole SC	10	1	0	9	12	32	−20	3	

Updated to match(es) played on July 24, 2016. Source: PLA standings
Rules for classification: 1) points; 2) wins; 3) goal differential

=== West Division ===
Pos	Team	Pld	W	D	L	GF	GA	GD	Pts	Qualification
1	Milwaukee Bavarians	10	6	3	1	19	7	+12	21	2016 PLA playoffs
2	Cedar Rapids Rampage United	10	5	4	1	18	10	+8	19	2016 PLA playoffs
3	Minneapolis City SC	10	3	4	3	15	15	0	13	
4	Minnesota United FC Reserves	10	2	4	4	13	17	−4	10	
5	Croatian Eagles	10	2	3	5	12	15	−3	9	
6	Madison 56ers	10	2	2	6	13	26	−13	8	

Updated to match(es) played on July 24, 2016. Source: PLA standings
Rules for classification: 1) points; 2) wins; 3) goal differential

=== Playoffs ===
The semifinals were played on July 30. The final and third place matches were played on July 31.

Semifinal
**1W**	**Milwaukee Bavarians**	**1**
2E	Toledo United	0
**1E**	**RWB Adria**	**2**
2W	Cedar Rapids Rampage United	0

Final
**1W**	**Milwaukee Bavarians**	**4**
1E	RWB Adria	2
Third Place
**2E**	**Toledo United**	**2**
2W	Cedar Rapids Rampage United	1

Bold = winner
* = after extra time, ( ) = penalty shootout score

== 2017 standings and playoffs ==
=== East Division ===
Pos	Team	Pld	W	D	L	GF	GA	GD	Pts	Qualification
1	RWB Adria	10	7	1	2	25	14	+11	22	2017 PLA playoffs
2	Carpathia FC	10	6	0	4	20	13	+7	18	2017 PLA playoffs
3	Muskegon Risers	10	5	3	2	18	12	+6	18	
4	Toledo Villa FC	10	5	2	3	25	13	+12	17	
5	Oakland County FC	10	4	0	6	18	28	−10	12	
6	Ole SC	10	0	0	10	4	30	−26	0	

Source: PLA standings
Rules for classification: 1) points; 2) wins; 3) goal differential

=== West Division ===
Pos	Team	Pld	W	D	L	GF	GA	GD	Pts	Qualification
1	Cedar Rapids Rampage United	10	9	0	1	31	5	+26	27	2017 PLA playoffs
2	Milwaukee Bavarians	10	9	0	1	22	7	+15	27	2017 PLA playoffs
3	Madison 56ers	10	3	2	5	18	24	−6	11	
4	Croatian Eagles	10	2	4	4	19	21	−2	10	
5	Aurora Borealis SC	10	2	1	7	9	27	−18	7	
6	Elgin Pumas	10	0	3	7	8	23	−15	3	

Source: PLA standings
Rules for classification: 1) points; 2) wins; 3) goal differential

=== Playoffs ===
Played at Heartland Value Fund Stadium in Glendale, Wisconsin.

Semifinal; July 29
W1	Cedar Rapids Rampage United	1
**E2**	**Carpathia FC**	**2**
E1	RWB Adria	2
**W2**	**Milwaukee Bavarians**	**4***

Final; July 30
E2	Carpathia FC	3
**W2**	**Milwaukee Bavarians**	**5**

Bold = winner
* = after extra time, ( ) = penalty shootout score
