= Minnesota United FC Reserves =

- Full name: Minnesota United FC Reserves
- Nickname: United Reserves
- Founded: 2013
- Stadium: East Ridge High School Stadium, Woodbury, MN
- Capacity: ~1,000
- Owners: Bill McGuire
- Head Coach: Peter Rivard
- League: Premier League of America
- Website: http://www.mnunitedfc.com/united-reserves
Home colors	Away colors

Established in 2013, Minnesota United FC Reserves were an American professional soccer club based in Woodbury, Minnesota who played in the Premier League of America. The team served as a development squad for their parent club, Minnesota United FC, then member of the North American Soccer League.

== Mission ==
Upon the establishment of the Reserve team in 2013, the head coach of the Minnesota United FC main team, Manny Lagos, clearly stressed that the primary mission of forming the new team would be building a stronger foundation for and raising competitiveness within the first team: "We want to continue to grow the vision of what the club can be. Having a Reserve team is a big piece of developing potential local players but also keep the first team competitive. When you have something like this it can grow into a lot of different areas but it’s really about building this club the right way so we can be strong and have a great culture for the future," Manny said.

== Season-by-season ==
Season	Division	League	Wins	Draw	Loses	Regular season	Playoffs	Open Cup
2014	4	NPSL (Midwest Region)	6	2	2	7th (out of 15)	Lost in the 1st round	Did not enter
2015	4	NPSL (Midwest Region)	4	6	2	8th (out of 13)	Did not qualify	Did not enter
2016	5	PLA (Western Conference)	2	4	4	4th (out of 6)	Did not qualify	Did not enter

== Rivalries ==
In the NPSL the Twin Cities Derby was contested between Minnesota United FC Reserves (based in Woodbury) and Minnesota Twin Stars (based in Minnetrista). After moving to the PLA the derby continues between the Reserves and Minneapolis City SC (based in Minneapolis).

== Current roster ==
Note: Flags indicate national team as defined under FIFA eligibility rules. Players may hold more than one non-FIFA nationality.

No.	Position	Nation	Player
1	GK	USA	Adam Acosta
2	DF	USA	Andres Jaramillo
3	DF	BIH	Midhat Mujic
4	DF	USA	Chris Aksoz
5	DF	USA	Bryce Murphy
5	DF	USA	Grant Bell
7	MF	USA	Abbai Habte
8	MF	USA	Daniel O'Brien
9	FW	MEX	Javier Alcantara
10	MF	USA	Saul Rosales
11	DF	USA	Mitch Wolff
13	MF	MEX	Daniel Cisneros
14	MF	USA	Charles Adams
16	DF	ENG	Benjamin Eastwell
18	MF	USA	Whitney Browne
20	FW	USA	Charles Theis
21	MF	NGA	Babatunde Oyekan
22	MF	USA	Skyler Schulz
23	MF	USA	Sam Man Jr.
24	GK	USA	Peter Runquist
29	MF	USA	Klenton Miles Stockman-Willis
41	FW	USA	Oblayon Nyemah Jr.
77	FW	USA	Brad Whitsitt
99	MF	MEX	Rodrigo Galvan Yanes
—	MF	USA	Joel Johannsen
—	MF	USA	Tom Shortland

== Staff ==
- (United States) Andy Seidel – Head Coach
- (United States) Chris Brisson – Assistant Coach
