= Kingston Stadium =

Football stadium in Cedar Rapids, Iowa

- Interactive map of Kingston Stadium
- Address: 907 15th Street SW; Cedar Rapids, Iowa
- Coordinates: 41°58′02.68″N 91°41′24.41″W
- Capacity: 15,000

Construction
- Opened: September 12, 1952
- Renovated: 2019
- Cost: 1952: $550,000 ($6.67 million in 2025 dollars); 2019: $2 million

Kingston Stadium is a football stadium in Cedar Rapids, Iowa. Kingston Stadium is located southwest of downtown Cedar Rapids, adjacent to Veterans Memorial Stadium and ImOn Ice Arena. Opened September 12, 1952, it was named for a settlement called Kingston established in 1839 on the west side of the Cedar River which was later annexed into Cedar Rapids.

In 2019, Kingston Stadium underwent three-months of renovations at a cost of $2 million. Upgrades included new turf, improved ADA compliant bleachers, and an eighth track lane allowing for state qualifying meets. The north bleachers were demolished and replaced with a grassy hillside.

== Uses ==
Kingston Stadium is the home stadium for Jefferson, Kennedy, and Washington high school football games. It previously hosted Regis and LaSalle high schools when they were in existence, and Coe College games before K. Raymond Clark Field was built.

Kingston Stadium hosted a Canadian Football League exhibition game in 1961, and one NFL exhibition game each in 1961, 1962, and 1963, the last matching the two-time defending NFL champion Green Bay Packers vs. the Washington Redskins.

In the 1970s Kingston Stadium was home to three semipro football teams: the Rapid Raiders (Midwest Football League) in 1972 and 1973; the Buccaneers (Central States League) in 1974; and the Falcons (Chicagoland League; Northern States League) in 1976 and 1977. The 1972 Rapid Raiders won the Midwest Football League championship. In 1978, the Metro Falcons (Northern States League) were refused permission to play at Kingston Stadium.

The Cedar Rapids Rampage United amateur soccer team in the Premier League of America played at Kingston Stadium in 2017.

The stadium has also been used for public school graduation ceremonies, cheerleading, marching band festivals, track meets and soccer matches.
