= Toledo United FC =

Toledo United
- Founded: 2016
- Stadium: Springfield High School; Holland, Ohio
- President: Shane Marchyshyn
- Head Coach: Taylor Todd
- League: Premier League of America
- 2016: 2nd, East Division; Playoffs: Third Place
Home colors	Away colors	Third colors

Toledo United was an American soccer team based in Toledo, Ohio, United States. It played in the Premier League of America (PLA). The team's colors were orange and white.

== History ==
Toledo United was founded in 2016 as an expansion team for the Premier League of America.

In their first season, Toledo United finished second in the East Division, and was eliminated in the first round of playoffs by the eventual champions Milwaukee Bavarians. Toledo United beat Cedar Rapids Rampage United in the third place match.

In an end-of-season message, team president Peter Schinkai said that the club "(had) been approached by a higher league about going full-pro in 2018 or 2019".

== Head coaches ==
Toledo United parted ways with David Hebestreit, its first head coach, following unspecified "reasons" after posting a 10-6-1 record.

== Year-by-year ==
Year	League	Reg. season	Playoffs	Open Cup
2016	PLA	2nd, East Division	Third place	Did not enter
