= Minnesota Amateur Soccer League =

- Founded: 1953
- Country: United States
- Confederation: U.S. Soccer
- Number of clubs: 41
- Website: www.masl.org

The Minnesota Amateur Soccer League is an adult amateur soccer league featuring teams from the Twin Cities and the surrounding areas. The league is sanctioned by the United States Adult Soccer Association, an affiliate of the United States Soccer Federation.

== History ==
Founded in 1953 as the Minnesota Soccer Association, the Minnesota Amateur Soccer League (MASL) is the oldest soccer association in Minnesota.

The state’s only sanctioned competitive soccer league for men changed its name to MASL in 1987 when the Minnesota Soccer Association (MSA) became Minnesota’s umbrella organization for adult soccer. In addition to MASL, Minnesota Soccer Association now includes the American Premier League (APL), Duluth Amateur Soccer League (DASL), Minnesota Recreational Soccer League (MRSL), Southern Minnesota Amateur Soccer Association (SMASA), Minnesota Senior Soccer League (MSSL) and the Minnesota Women’s Soccer League (MWSL).

The MSA, which began with four teams, spent its first 15 years as the only governing soccer body in Minnesota that was affiliated with the U.S. Soccer Federation. In 1968, a new youth soccer association, the Minnesota Junior Soccer Association, joined the MSA.

MASL has 41 teams and remains the premier amateur soccer league in the state. This prevalence is due in part to the strong reputation around the state and country as well as the vast number of MSA Hall of Fame members that continue to support the league.

== Teams ==
=== Division 1 ===
- Cardinals
- Dynamo FC
- FC Minnesota
- Fire SC
- Force FC
- Haaka
- Lions FC
- SPAM FC
- Stegman's 1977
- Vlora FC

=== Division 2 ===
- Camargo FC
- Cougars
- Departivo Minnesota
- FC Shango
- Lewis Dragons
- Maple BUMS
- Scorpion Strikers FC
- Stegman's Old Boys FC
- WB Burn
- Wolverines FC

=== Division 3 ===
- Alloy BC
- Dukes
- Dynamo FC 18
- Force FC 19
- Lino FC
- Northrop United
- River City FC
- SPAM FC 09
- Stegman's Athletic
- Waconia FC

=== Division 4 ===
- AFC Lexington Parkway
- Blackhawks
- K BC
- Karen FC
- Pirates FC
- Strikers FC
- Swan FC
- Thor FC
- V-Hawks
- Vlora FC II

== Champions ==
Year	Division 1	Division 2	Division 3	Division 4
1999	Blackhawks	Inferno 98	Inferno 99	Blue Devils FC*
2000	Inferno 95	Blue Devils FC	Scorpions III	Mexico (Anoka)*
2001	Inferno 95	TFC I	Strikers 00	Dukes*
2002	Inferno 95	FC Shango	Sock Monkey FC	Falcons*
2003	FC Internationals	Azteca	Rojos	Rochester, Wolverines, Strikers 02*
2004	FC Internationals	TC Fire 00	Rochester	Dukes, Elk River FC. Newcastle*
2005	FC Internationals	Rochester	Inferno Rebels	TC Fire 03
2006	Inferno 95	Andover	Wolverines FC	Elk River FC
2007	Inferno 95	Inferno 98	Keliix-Intra	Carioca
2008	Fire SC	Cougars	Carioca	Mahtomedi United
2009	Fire SC	Carioca	Newcastle	Haaka
2010	Carioca	Andover	Rise FC	Lions FC
2011	Cardinals FC	Rise FC	Haaka	Super Eagles
2012	Rise FC	Haaka	Lions FC	SPAM FC
2013	Fire SC	Keliix-Intra	Trendy Lions FC	Nickelback Rulez
2014	Cardinals FC	FC Scorpions Strikers	SPAM FC	VSLT FC
2015	Cardinals FC	Trendy Lions	VSLT FC	Force FC
2016	Stegman's City	VSLT FC	Force FC	WNWU
2017	Stegman's 1977	Vlora City FC	Stegman's Old Boys FC	Dynamo FC St. Cloud

NOTE: * = Division 3 (Group A, B, or C) winner. Division structure was changed in 2005 with the addition of Division 4.

== Cup Tournaments ==
MASL sanction two cup tournaments annually. First played in 1962, Minnesota Cup is open to any adult soccer club in the state. Established in 1966, Wilson Cup is contested between clubs at the Division 2 level or lower.

Year	Minnesota Cup	Wilson Cup
1998	Inferno 95	Inferno 98
1999	FC Internationals	Inferno Rebels
2000	FC Internationals	Edina
2001	FC Internationals	Cubs
2002	Inferno 95	Azteca
2003	Blackhawks	Andover
2004	Inferno 95	Inferno Rebels
2005	FC Internationals	TFC I
2006	FC Internationals	TC Fire 06
2007	Inferno 95	TFC II
2008	Inferno 98	Cubs
2009	Inferno 98	Lewis Dragons
2010	Sambas 96	Lewis Dragons
2011	FC Internationals	Rise FC
2012	Rise FC	Fire SC
2013	Fire SC	Wolverines FC
2014	Fire SC	Force FC
2015	Cardinals FC	FC Shango
2016	Stegman's City Internationals	Haaka FC
2017	Cardinals FC	Dynamo FC St. Cloud
