= AFC Ann Arbor =

- Full name: Association Football Club Ann Arbor
- Nickname: The Mighty Oak
- Founded: 2014; 12 years ago
- Stadium: Hollway Field, Pioneer HS
- Manager: Rod Asllani
- League: USL League Two
- 2024: 4th, Great Lakes Division; Playoffs: DNQ
- Website: afcannarbor.com
Home colors	Away colors

AFC Ann Arbor is an American soccer club based in Ann Arbor, Michigan, with a men's team that has played in USL League Two since 2020 and a women's team that has played in USL W League since 2020. The men's team played in the National Premier Soccer League from 2016 to 2019, and the women's team played in the United Women's Soccer during its inaugural 2019 season.

== History ==
AFC Ann Arbor was started by a group of Ann Arbor residents with a desire to have a local team. The team had applied to the National Premier Soccer League for the 2015 season but its application was declined. Instead, AFC Ann Arbor and Grand Rapids FC, another team denied by the NPSL, decided to start a league of their own called the Great Lakes Premier League. The new league held its inaugural meetings on January 17, 2015.

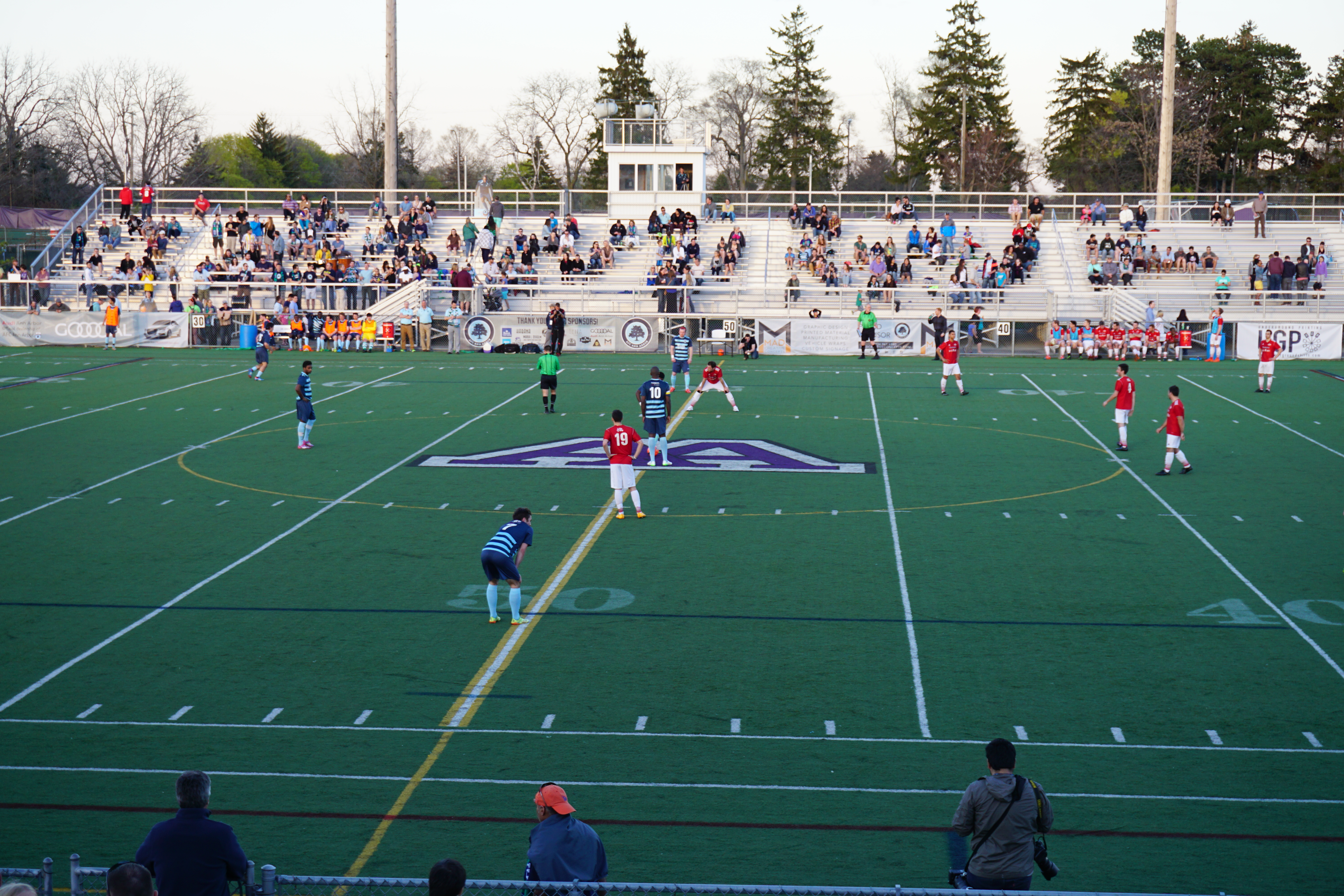
AFC Ann Arbor in action against San Marino Soccer in a 2015 friendly at Hollway Field

Starting with the 2016 season, AFC Ann Arbor played in the National Premier Soccer League as part of the Midwest Region under manager Eric Rudland, formerly of Lansing United. They finished in second place in the Great Lakes West Division in their first NPSL season, advancing to the national playoffs, but ultimately losing to AFC Cleveland on penalty kicks.

The 2017 season brought more success for AFC Ann Arbor as they won their first ever Great Lakes Division Championship and the inaugural Michigan Milk Cup in the process. They again advanced to the NPSL national playoffs defeating the Dayton Dynamo in the second record (having received a bye in the first round) before falling to Detroit City FC 3–2 in extra time in the Midwest regional final.

The 2018 season brought AFC Ann Arbor their second consecutive Great Lakes Division Championship, topping FC Columbus 1–0 for the championship. AFCAA were given a bye to the semi-finals for the NPSL Midwest Regionals. The side hosted the semis and finals at Ann Arbor Huron High School. The club topped Cleveland SC 1–0 in the semi-finals, but fell to Duluth FC in penalty kicks in the final. Following the season's conclusion, Joseph Stanley Okumu, a center back that spent the 2018 season with the club, was named TopDrawerSoccer.com NPSL Player of the Year.

In the 2019 season, AFCAA made the playoffs for the fourth time in as many seasons in the NPSL. The postseason match was embroiled in controversy as the match against Rochester Lancers had to be called off in the 69th minute after a series of weather delays. Because Cardinal Stadium does not have lights, the match could not be completed outdoors and contingency plans were rejected by Lancers. After initially looking at a coin flip finish to the match, the match was finished in Erie, PA, where Lancers won in penalties. Ahead of the 2019 season, AFC Ann Arbor announced they would be adding a women's side set to begin play in United Women's Soccer. The side finished sixth in the six-team UWS Midwest winning two matches in their inaugural season.

Ahead of the 2020 season, AFC Ann Arbor announced they would be joining USL League Two with the women's team joining USL W League.

The club suspended operations for the 2020 and 2021 seasons due to the COVID pandemic.

Prior to the 2022 season, the club announced that former men's team head coach Eric Rudland would be shifting to the role of club Sporting Director while former assistant coach Rod Asllani would be taking over as head coach of the men's team. The men's team finished third (7–3–4) in the USL2 Great Lakes Division behind Kalamazoo FC and Flint City Bucks, missing the playoffs for the first time in five (non-suspended) seasons.

In the 2023 season, the AFCAA men's team found its way back to the postseason with a 2nd-place finish in the USL2 Great Lakes Division behind Flint City Bucks, where they met first round opponents Thunder Bay Chill. Despite falling behind 3-0 early in the 2nd half of the match, AFC Ann Arbor managed to level the match with 3 goals after the 72nd minute before the end of regulation, eventually losing 5–3 after extra-time periods.

== Stadium ==
From 2015 to 2017, AFCAA's home field was Hollway Field, located at Pioneer High School.

In 2018, the team then moved to Skyline High School.

In 2019, the team signed a three-year agreement to use Concordia University's Cardinal Stadium, located off of Geddes Road in Ann Arbor, but only a single season was played there because the club sat out the 2020 and 2021 seasons due to the COVID pandemic.

In 2022, because AAPS was not yet allowing rental of its facilities due to the pandemic, the team played at Saline Hornet Stadium.

In 2023, the team returned to its original home at Hollway Field, located at Pioneer High School.

== Head coaches ==
- (United States) David Hebestreit (2014–2015)
- (United States) Eric Rudland (2015–2021)
- (Albania) Rod Asllani (2022–present)

== Year-by-year ==
Year	Tier	League	Regular season W–D–L	Playoffs	U.S. Open Cup	Average Attendance
2015	5	GLPL	3rd of 5 (2–2–4)	N/A	Ineligible	
2016	4	NPSL	2nd of 7, Midwest-Great Lakes West (6–3–3)	Regional semifinal	Ineligible	
2017	4	NPSL	1st of 8, Midwest-Great Lakes (12–1–1)	Regional Final	First round	
2018	4	NPSL	1st of 7, Midwest-Great Lakes (9–1–2)	Regional Final	First round	
2019	4	NPSL	2nd of 8, Midwest-Great Lakes (9–2–3)	Regional quarterfinal	First round	
2020	4	USL2	Season cancelled due to COVID-19 pandemic			
2021	4	USL2	did not play due to COVID-19 pandemic			
2022	4	USL2	3nd of 6, Central-Great Lakes (7–3–4)	did not qualify	did not qualify	
2023	4	USL2	2nd of 7, Central-Great Lakes (6–1–5)	Conference Quarterfinals	did not qualify	
2024	4	USL2	4th of 8, Central-Great Lakes (8–2–4)	did not qualify	did not qualify	
2025	4	USL2	3rd of 8, Central-Great Lakes (6–3–3)	Did not qualify	Did not qualify	
2026	4	USL2	5th of 7, Central-Great Lakes (6–1–5)	Did not qualify	Did not qualify	

1. ^{A} No playoffs were held in the inaugural season of the Great Lakes Premier League.
2. ^{B} To enter the U.S. Open Cup, a team must have belonged to an affiliated league with at least 4 teams that played a schedule of at least 10 games.

== USL W League (2022–) ==
=== History ===
AFC Ann Arbor launched a women's side in October 2018, competing in the United Women's Soccer league, with Andy Pritchard as its first head coach. The team's first player signing was Megan Trapp, and its first goalscorer was former Japan national team player Mami Yamaguchi.

The team suspended play for 2020 and 2021 due to the impact of the COVID-19 pandemic on sports, and AFC Ann Arbor announced the move of its women's side to the USL W League in 2022, with former men's side player Boyzzz Khumalo as its head coach. The team added Chloe Ricketts, a 14-year-old, to the senior squad, where she became the USL W League's youngest goalscorer.

=== Head coaches ===
- (England) Andy Pritchard (2018–2019)
- (South Africa) Boyzzz Khumalo (2019–2022)
- (United States) Kevin Taylor (2023-)

=== Year-by-year ===
As of matches played July 6, 2026.

Year	League	Regular season	Playoffs
2019	UWS	6th of 6 (2–8–0); Midwest Division	DNQ
2020	Did not play due to COVID-19		
2021	Did not play due to COVID-19		
2022	USLW	4th of 8 (6–3–3); Great Lakes Division	DNQ
2023	USLW	5th of 6 (4–6–2); Great Lakes Division	DNQ
2024	USLW	5th of 7 (5–6–1); Great Lakes Division	DNQ
2025	USLW	2nd of 6 (6–6–2); Great Lakes Division	DNQ
2026	USLW	4th of 5 (2–7–1); Great Lakes Division	DNQ

==== Honors ====
- Michigan Milk Cup: 2022

=== Notable former players ===
- (United States) Chloe Ricketts
- (Canada) Jayde Riviere
- (Japan) Mami Yamaguchi
