= Houseman Field =

Stadium in Grand Rapids, Michigan, U.S.

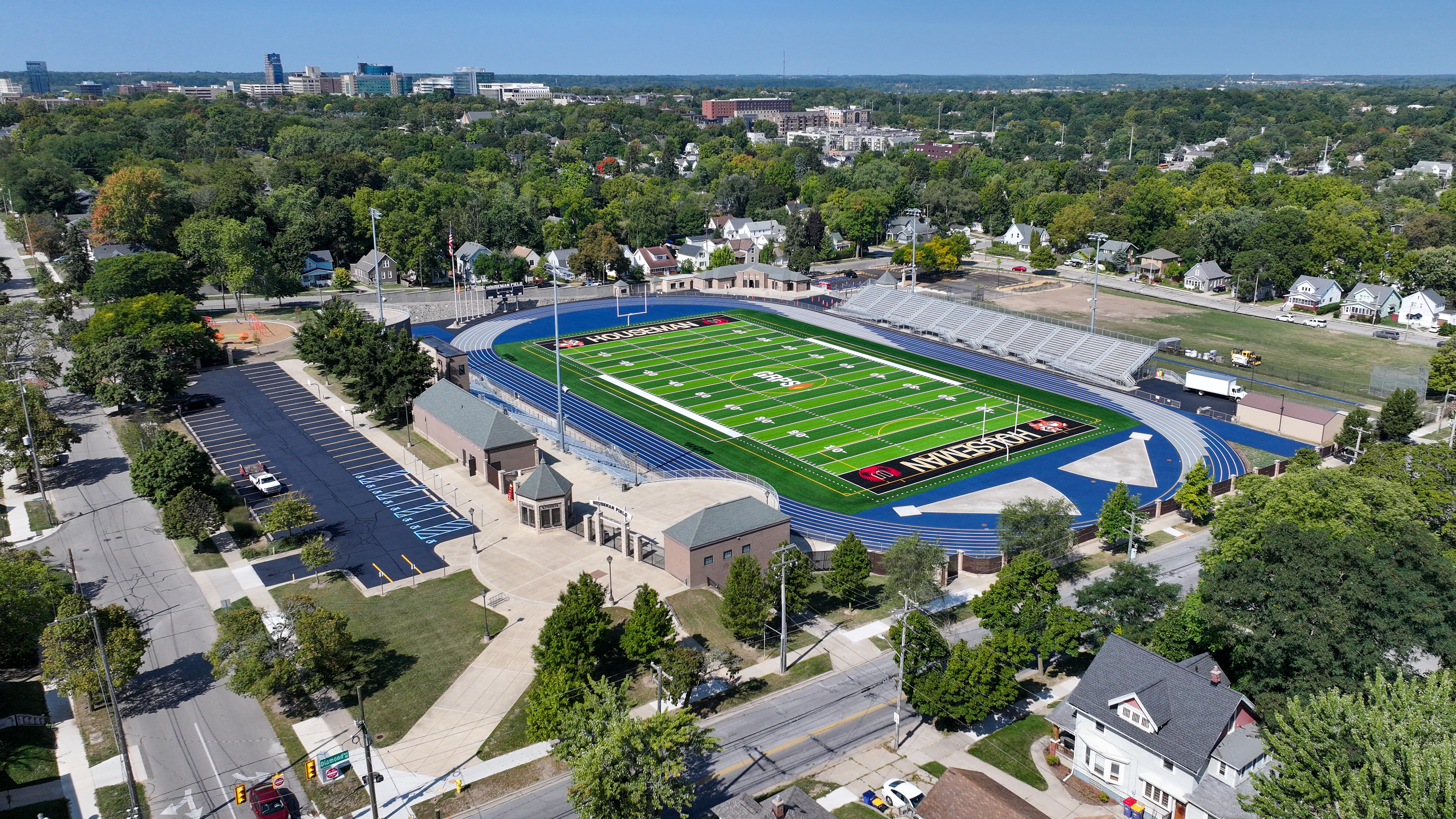
- Houseman Field, September 2025
- Interactive map of Houseman Field
- Location: Grand Rapids, MI
- Coordinates: 42.9660°N 85.6462°W
- Owner: Grand Rapids Public Schools
- Capacity: 8,000

Construction
- Built: 1923
- Renovated: 2025

Tenants
- Grand Rapids Central High School; Union High School; Ottawa Hills High School; Grand Rapids FC (USL2) (2015–2021)

Houseman Field is an 8,000-seat multipurpose stadium located in Grand Rapids, Michigan. It is named for former mayor and Congressman Julius Houseman and is the home of Grand Rapids Public Schools athletics and the Aquinas College Saints track teams. Grand Rapids Public Schools owns this stadium.

== History ==
Julius Houseman's daughter, Hattie, donated six acres (24,000 m^{2}) of land to the school district in 1907 for use as an athletic field. While it would be used for the Grand Rapids Central High School football team's football practices in the next 15 years, it was not until 1923 that the current stadium was built on that site; its first event was Catholic Central High School's 42–0 victory over Sparta High School. The football field was expanded in 1926, lights were installed in 1940, and artificial turf replaced grass in 1973.

Grand Rapids Central became the longest serving tenant of Houseman Field, and over the years, other high schools, including Creston High School, Catholic Central High School and West Catholic High School have also played their home games at this stadium, owing to the growing number of high schools in Grand Rapids. Currently, it is the home of the Ottawa Hills and Union High School football, soccer, and track and field teams.

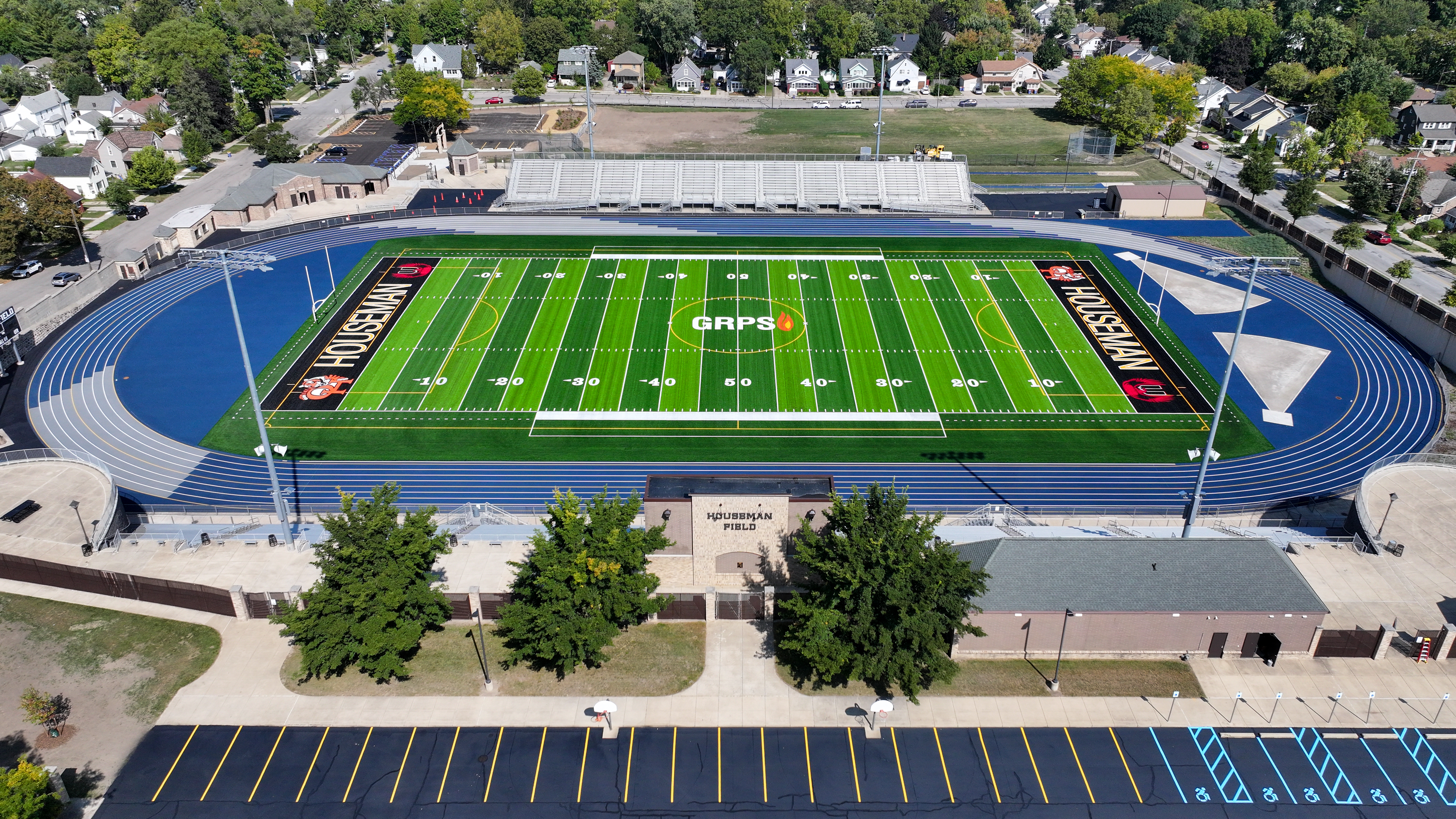

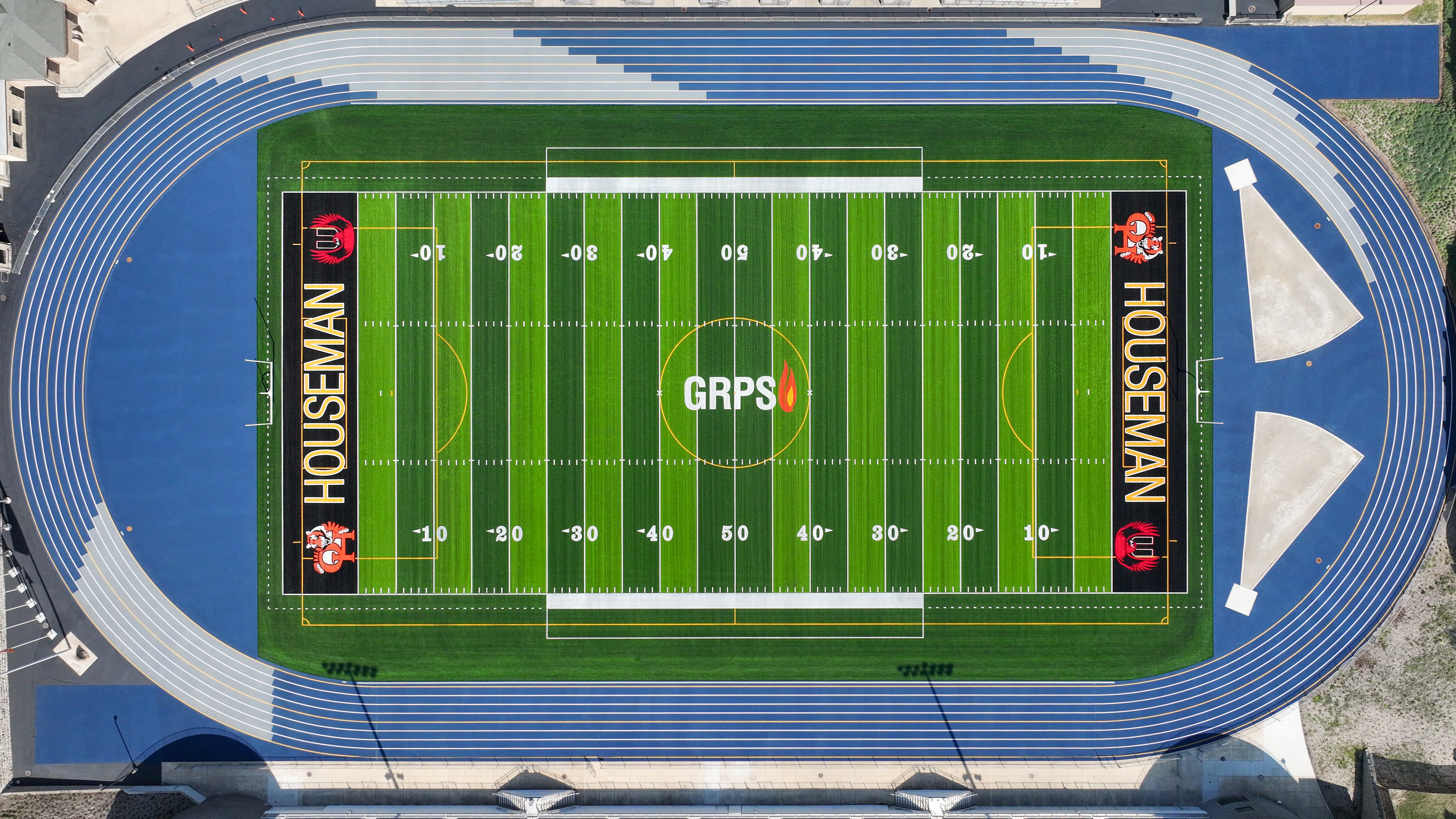

== 2009 renovation ==
In October 2008, the Grand Rapids Public Schools' Board of Education announced plans to perform a $6 million renovation to Houseman Field using funds left over from a 2004 facilities improvement bond. The renovation included turf replacement, a new press box, concession and restroom facilities, as well as miscellaneous structural and technological improvements. The newly renovated facility was reopened on August 25, 2009. The renovation won the Peoples Choice Award and shared the Gerald R. Helmholdt Grand Prize Award at the 2009 Grand Rapids Neighborhood Business Awards.

== 2025 renovation ==
In the summer of 2025, a renovation funded by the Reimagine GRPS bond was completed. Improvements included a new track, new artificial turf, energy-efficient LED lighting, expanded parking, and locker room upgrades.

== Notable athletes ==
- Gerald R. Ford, played for University of Michigan and later became the 38th president of the United States
- Terry Barr, played for University of Michigan and on NFL's Detroit Lions' 1957 NFL title squad with two Pro Bowl appearances
- Kelly Butler, played for Purdue University and the NFL's Detroit Lions and Cleveland Browns
- Clarence Ellis, played for the University of Notre Dame and the National Football League's Atlanta Falcons; also was a high school state champion in track and field
- David Harris, played for University of Michigan and currently plays for NFL's New York Jets
- Bob Lurtsema, played for Western Michigan University and with the NFL's New York Giants, Minnesota Vikings and Seattle Seahawks
- Terna Nande, played for Miami University (Ohio) and NFL's Tennessee Titans and is currently playing in the Canadian Football League's British Columbia Lions
- Rueben Riley, played for University of Michigan and played for the NFL's Washington Redskins Carolina Panthers and Miami Dolphins
