= Cedar Rapids Rampage United =

- Founded: 2016
- Dissolved: 2018
- Stadium: Clark Field, Coe College (2016); Kingston Stadium (2017)
- Capacity: 2,200 (2016); 15,000 (2017)
- Owner: Chris Kokalis; Bob Sullivan; Kenneth Moninski
- League: Premier League of America
- Website: http://www.cedarrapidsrampage.com/
| Home colors | Away colors |

The Cedar Rapids Rampage United were an American amateur Soccer franchise based in Cedar Rapids, Iowa that played in the Premier League of America. Founded in March 2016, the team made its debut in the Premier League of America with the 2016 season. The team's name and logo were revealed at a press conference on March 3, 2016. They played the 2016 season at Coe College's Clark Field and the 2017 season at the 15,000-capacity Kingston Stadium, which is used mostly for American football and soccer matches.

The team shared its ownership group with the Cedar Rapids Titans of the Indoor Football League, and an indoor team in the Major Arena Soccer League called the Cedar Rapids Rampage. In the 2016 season they finished with a 5-4-1 Record, and clinched a spot in the PLA Playoffs in Ohio. They finished 4th overall in the league, losing 2-0 against RWB Adria. In 2017, they were Western Division Champions but lost in the PLA Playoffs Semifinal to Carpathia FC, 2-1.

When ownership moved to Orlando, Florida, forward Kenan Malicevic founded current club Cedar Rapids Inferno to take the place of Rampage United starting in the 2018 outdoor season.

== Coaching staff ==
- (Brazil) Hewerton Moriera - Head Coach

== Sponsors ==
| Period | Kit manufacturer | Shirt sponsor |
|---|---|---|
| 2016- | UN1TUS | ShopFutsal.com |
