= Toledo Villa FC =

American soccer team

- Full name: Toledo Villa Football Club
- Founded: 2017; 9 years ago
- Stadium: Paul Hotmer Field
- Owner: Aaron Swiggum, Brett Stamats, David Hammack and Mike Hanf
- Head Coach: Mathius (Matt) Johnson
- League: USL League Two
- 2026: 6th, Valley Division; Playoffs: DNQ
- Website: toledovillafc.com
Home colors

Toledo Villa FC is a pre-professional soccer club in Toledo, Ohio competing in the Valley Division of the Central Conference in USL League Two. They previously played in the Premier League of America, United Premier Soccer League, and National Premier Soccer League.

== History ==
Founded in 2017, through a partnership of Pacesetter Soccer Club, Northaven Group (both from Sylvania, Ohio), Total Sports, Inc. (from Wixom, Michigan), and a private, Michigan-based group. The club joined the Premier League of America for its 2017 season, playing in the East Division.

The club joined the United Premier Soccer League for the 2018 season in the East Division, after the Premier League of America folded following the 2017 season and 11 of the 12 member clubs moved to form the Midwest Conference in the UPSL. They won their division in their debut season, before falling in the first round of the Midwest Conference playoffs.

In April 2018, a new ownership group, consisting of Aaron Swiggum, Brett Stamats, and David Hammack, purchased the club. Their goal was to join the USL divisions by 2020.

For the 2019 season, the club moved to the National Premier Soccer League, joining the Great Lakes Conference.

In 2021, the club announced they would join USL League Two, where they played in the Great Lakes Division. They would play in the Valley Division from 2022-2024, and rejoin that division in 2026 after playing the 2025 season in the Great Forest Division

== Year-by-year ==
=== Men's team ===
Year	Level	League	Regular season (W–L–T)	Playoffs
2017	5	Premier League of America	4th, East (5–3–2)	did not qualify
2018	5	United Premier Soccer League	1st, East (6–1–3)	Semi-finals, Midwest Conference
2019	4	National Premier Soccer League	7th, Great Lakes (2–11–1)	did not qualify
2020	4	National Premier Soccer League	Season cancelled due to COVID-19 pandemic	
2021	4	USL League Two	7th, Great Lakes (3–7–4)	did not qualify
2022	4	USL League Two	4th, Valley (4–10–0)	did not qualify
2023	4	USL League Two	3rd, Valley (5–3–4)	did not qualify
2024	4	USL League Two	3rd, Valley (5–3–4)	did not qualify
2025	4	USL League Two	4th, Great Forest (4–5–3)	did not qualify
2026	4	USL League Two	6th, Valley (1–10–1)	did not qualify

=== Women's team ===
Year	Level	League	Regular season (W–L–T)	Playoffs
2025	4	USL W League	6th, Great Lakes (2–7–1)	did not qualify
2026	4	USL W League	4th, Valley (0–9–0)	did not qualify
