= Carpathia FC =

- Full name: Carpathia Football Club
- Founded: 1952
- Stadium: Avondale High School; Auburn Hills, Michigan
- Capacity: 2,000
- Owner: Bruce Wilden
- Head Coach: Joey Tinnion
- League: National Premier Soccer League
- Website: http://www.carpathiafc.com/
Home colors	Away colors

Carpathia FC is an American soccer club based in Sterling Heights, a suburb of Detroit that plays in the National Premier Soccer League. It currently plays its home matches at Avondale High School in Auburn Hills, Michigan.

== History ==
The Carpathia Kickers Soccer Club was founded in 1952 and comprises over 40 youth and adult teams.

In 2015, the club applied to and gained entry to the Premier League of America. Its men's team was admitted and joined the league for 2016.

== Stadium ==
Carpathia FC will play its home games at Carpathia Club in Sterling Heights, MI and L'Anse Creuse High School North in Macomb Township, MI.

== Head coaches ==
- (United States) Bruce Wilden (2016–2019)

== Year-by-year ==
Year	Tier	League	Regular season	U.S. Open Cup	Average Attendance
2016		PLA			
