= Croatian Eagles =

American soccer club

- Full name: Croatian Eagles Soccer Club
- Founded: 1922
- Stadium: Croatian Park; Franklin, Wisconsin
- Capacity: 2,500
- Board President: Fredy Jany
- Head Coach: Chris Logan
- League: United Premier Soccer League
- 2015: 5th
Home colors	Away colors

Croatian Eagles Soccer Club (Croatian: NK Hrvatski Orlovi) is an American soccer team that plays in the United Premier Soccer League. The club was established in 1922 by Croatian Americans, and is one of the oldest continuously run soccer clubs in North America. According to legend, the club was originally going to be named "NK Hrvatski Sokole" but the founders of the club were not able to translate "Sokole". The club's biggest rivals are the United Serbians Soccer Club and Milwaukee Bavarian SC.

The club participated in the 2006 Lamar Hunt U.S. Open Cup. They were champs of the Wisconsin Adult Soccer Association's Challenge Cup five times, from 1999 to 2003. The club is also a regular participant in the Croatian-North American Soccer Tournament which they have previously hosted 4 times and they last hosted in 2017. They have not won a tournament to date.

The Croatian Eagles represented the state of Wisconsin at the USSF National Amateur Cup Region II in Bowling Green, KY (6/27/08-6/29/08). They completed the tournament with a 2–1 victory over the St. Louis Scott Gallagher team. The women's team has won the open cup and is in regionals. This men's team has many players who eventually play professional soccer throughout the world. Many players from the Majors team at Croatian Eagles Soccer Club have many Division 1 along with Division 2 and 3 players in the summers.

The Croatian Eagles also have a growing youth program with many teams that complete in the Wisconsin Developmental Academy and Midwest Regional League. The former director of coaching, Scott Suprise, has grown the youth program of Croatian Eagles from one team in 1998, to 34 teams at the end of 2016. The club uses the youth program to uniquely feed college, post-college, and professional players to their Premier League of America team, headed by current coach, Chris Logan.

On Sunday July 22, 2012, the Croatian Eagles represented the state of Wisconsin at the USASA National Cup winning 3–2 over the ASC New Star's from Texas and were national Champions for 2012. They automatically qualified for competing in the 2013 Lamar Hunt U.S. Open Cup.

The 2015 season saw Croatian Eagles enter their men's team in the fledgling Great Lakes Premier League along with teams from Illinois and Michigan. They finished fifth that season, and continued with the league, re-branded as the Premier League of America until that league merged with the United Premier Soccer League.

== Croatian Park ==
Croatian Park was founded in 1956 by Croatian Americans from Milwaukee. The ground was purchased as a place for Croatians to mingle and celebrate their culture. Over the years Croatian Park has expanded to now over 30 acres and part of the local community in Franklin. It is still the pride & joy of the Croatian Community of Milwaukee and surrounding areas. It now is a local gathering place not only for Croatians, but also locals from the SE WI area who appreciate using the Park for their own activities. Croatian Park is also home to the Croatian Eagles Soccer Club, which is North America's older active soccer club. Croatian Park has 5 regulation sized fields, and any one is almost guaranteed to see some team practicing or playing any time of the week. Croatian Fest has been held every year for at least 50+ years. Every year there is a Croatian Mass at 10 a.m. with a cultural program typically a few hours later. Many Croatians from around Wisconsin, Minnesota, and Illinois come to celebrate the culture. There is a weekly beer garden held on Thursdays from 5 to 10 pm starting in May and lasts until September. In the summer of 2019, special guests from New Zealand, Klapa Samoana, who have performed at numerous Dinamo Zagreb games, and KUD Tena from Đakovo, Croatia, came and performed for many people at the Park. Dinamo Zagreb held 2 soccer camps at the park, coached by trainers from Zagreb. Food is provided by American European Foods with all sorts of Croatian delicacies, such as Ćevapi and Croatian Sausages. Croatian Park is home to Croatian Park Ale, and supplies Karlovačko, Croatian Cordials such as Šljivovica, Pelinkovac, and many other items for every major event.
