= 2018 NPSL season =

National Premier Soccer League
- Season: 2018
- Dates: March 10 – August 4
- Champions: Miami FC 2 (1st Title)
- Regular Season Champions: Laredo Heat SC (1st Title)
- 2019 Hank Steinbrecher Cup qualifier: FC Motown
- 2019 U.S. Open Cup qualifiers: AFC Ann Arbor; Duluth FC; El Farolito; Erie Commodores FC; FC Baltimore; FC Motown; FC Mulhouse Portland; Laredo Heat; Little Rock Rangers; Miami FC; Midland-Odessa Sockers FC; New York Cosmos B Orange County FC; Philadelphia Lone Star FC
- Matches: 616
- Goals: 2,341 (3.8 per match)
- Best player: (United States) Matt Nigro (FC Motown)
- Top goalscorer: (Mexico) Omar Nuño (Sonoma County Sol) (20 Goals)
- Best goalkeeper: (Germany) Jan Hoffelner (Duluth FC) (5 clean sheets, 0.68 goals-against average)
- Biggest home win: FC Baltimore 13–0 Legacy 76 (June 29)
- Biggest away win: FC Indiana 0–11 Detroit City FC (May 27); Greater Binghamton FC 0–11 Erie Commodores (May 30)
- Highest scoring: FC Baltimore 13–0 Legacy 76 (June 29)

The 2018 National Premier Soccer League season was part of the 106th season of FIFA-sanctioned soccer in the United States and the 16th season of the National Premier Soccer League (NPSL). Elm City Express was the defending champion.

The 2018 NPSL champion qualifies to play for the 2019 Hank Steinbrecher Cup organized by the United States Adult Soccer Association. The NPSL has elected to use results of the 2018 league season to determine which NPSL clubs qualify for the 2019 U.S. Open Cup. The United States Soccer Federation has not yet determined how many berths for the U.S. Open Cup will be awarded to NPSL clubs.

Miami FC 2 defeated FC Motown on the road, 3–1, to win the 2018 NPSL championship. Dylan Mares was named Man of the Match.

== Changes from 2017 ==
The Atlantic Blue Conference and the Atlantic White Conference were merged to form the North Atlantic Conference. The top four teams in the new conference qualify for the conference playoffs.

Only three teams in the Mid-Atlantic Conference qualify for the conference playoffs instead of four teams as in 2017. The top team gets a bye to the conference final.

With the number of conferences in the Northeast Region reduced from four to three, a wildcard team qualifies for the region semifinals. The wildcard team is the conference final loser with the best regular-season record.

The East and West Divisions of the Southeast Conference are eliminated, and conference playoff qualification is determined on the basis of conference standings.

The Lone Star Conference is divided into groups: Red, White and Blue. Teams play the other members of their group twice and other conference members only once. Lone Star Conference playoff qualification is based on standings in the group, not the conference. The top two group winners receive the first and second seeds and a bye to the conference semifinals. The remaining group winner receives the third seed and plays in the conference quarterfinals along with each group's second-place team.

Northwest Conference teams play each other three times instead of two.

Following the expansion of the Golden Gate Conference, members play each other twice instead of three times.

South Region Semifinal matchups are predetermined based on pairings of specific conferences and not based on region seeding. The Southeast Conference champion plays the Sunshine Conference champion, and the Lone Star Conference champion plays the Heartland Conference champion. Hone-field advantage for the region semifinals is based on region seeding.

The Golden Gate Conference receives an additional berth to the West Region playoffs, and the region wildcard berth is eliminated. The Southwest Conference continues to have three berths in the West Region playoffs, but the conference's third seed is determined by a play-in game between the third- and fourth-place teams. West Region Quarterfinal matchups are predetermined based on placing within the conference and not based on region seeding. West Region teams are seeded and bracketed for the semifinals.

Greater Binghamton FC Thunder moved from the Keystone Conference in the Northeast Region to the East Conference in the Midwest Region. The move puts the Thunder in the same conference as three other New York state teams: FC Buffalo, the Rochester Lancers and Syracuse FC. The other four New York state NPSL teams, the Brooklyn Italians, Kingston Stockade FC, New York Athletic Club and the New York Cosmos B, all play in the new North Atlantic Conference in the Northeast Region.

== Teams ==
Eighteen new clubs joined the NPSL for the 2018 season, including one that returned from a one-year hiatus, and 16 teams departed. Jacksonville Armada FC replaced Jacksonville Armada U-23, the organization's B squad, after the 2018 North American Soccer League season was cancelled. The Clarkstown SC Eagles merged with FC Motown. The resulting combined team used the FC Motown name and played its home matches in Madison, New Jersey.

Ninety-eight teams competed in the NPSL during the 2018 season.

=== Incoming teams ===
Team	Location	Notes
Academica SC	Stanislaus County, California	Joined from LIGA NorCal
Atlantic City FC	Galloway Township, New Jersey	Expansion
FC Baltimore	Essex, Maryland	Expansion
FC Brownsville	Brownsville, Texas	Expansion
Charlottesville Alliance FC	Charlottesville, Virginia	Previously an amateur team called Aromas Café FC
Cleveland SC	University Heights, Ohio	Expansion
FC Columbus	Grandview Heights, Ohio	Expansion
FC Davis	Yolo County, California	Expansion
El Farolito	San Francisco, California	Joined from San Francisco Soccer Football League
FC Golden State	Rose Hills, Los Angeles County, California	Expansion
Greenville FC	Greenville, South Carolina	Expansion
Katy 1895 FC	Greater Houston, Texas	Expansion
Laredo Heat	Laredo, Texas	Joined from PDL
Miami FC 2	Miami Gardens, Florida	Expansion, second team of NASL franchise
FC Monmouth	Red Bank, New Jersey	Expansion
Northern Virginia United FC	Leesburg, Virginia	Expansion
Saint Louis Club Atletico	St. Louis, Missouri	Expansion
Storm FC	Pembroke Pines, Florida	Returned from one-year hiatus; club listed on NPSL website without any official announcement of return

=== Moved and/or rebranded teams ===
Team	Previous Name	Location	Previous Location	Notes
ASC San Diego	Albion SC Pros	San Diego, California		Rebrand
Emerald Force SC	Knoxville Force	Knoxville, Tennessee		Rebrand
Jacksonville Armada FC	Jacksonville Armada U-23	Jacksonville, Florida		Main team replaced reserve side after 2018 NASL season was cancelled.
Kitsap Pumas	Kitsap SC	Kitsap County, Washington		Rebrand
Midland-Odessa Sockers FC	Midland-Odessa FC	Midland, Texas		Rebrand
FC Motown	Clarkstown SC Eagles	Madison, New Jersey	Clarkstown, New York	Merger, rebrand and move
Palm Beach United	Beaches FC	Palm Beach Gardens, Florida	Jupiter, Florida	Rebrand and move
Torch FC	Buxmont Torch FC	Towamencin Township, Pennsylvania	Perkasie, Pennsylvania	Rebrand; home matches still played in Bucks ("Bux") and Montgomery ("Mont") Counties.
Torch FC	Buxmont Torch FC	Nockamixon Township, Pennsylvania	Perkasie, Pennsylvania	Rebrand; home matches still played in Bucks ("Bux") and Montgomery ("Mont") Counties.

=== Outgoing teams ===
Team	Location	Notes
Birmingham Hammers	Birmingham, Alabama	Joined PDL
FC Carolina United	Rock Hill, South Carolina	Not listed on NPSL website
City of Angels FC	Los Angeles, California	Not listed on NPSL website
AFC Cleveland	Cleveland, Ohio	Membership terminated; not in good financial standing with NPSL.
Sport Club Corinthians USA	Glendora, California	Membership terminated; not in good financial standing with NPSL.
Dallas City FC	Dallas, Texas	Not listed on NPSL website
Dayton Dynamo	Dayton, Ohio	Hiatus for 2018 before planned 2019 professional relaunch.
Fredericksburg FC	Fredericksburg, Virginia	Not listed on NPSL website
Kraze United	Orlando, Florida	Not listed on NPSL website
Lansing United	East Lansing, Michigan	Joined PDL
Memphis City FC	Memphis, Tennessee	Joined PDL
Miami Fusion FC	Miami, Florida	Folded
Michigan Stars FC	Berkley, Michigan	Suspended operations for 2018
Pierce County FC	Burien, Washington (in King County, three matches)	Suspended operations for 2018; franchise up for sale.
Pierce County FC	Bonney Lake, Washington (in Pierce County, two matches)	Suspended operations for 2018; franchise up for sale.
Seacoast United Phantoms	Portsmouth, New Hampshire	Not listed on NPSL website
SoCal SC	San Bernardino, California	Folded

=== 2018 teams ===
Team	Home city (cities)	Home ground(s)	Region	Conference
Academica SC	Stanislaus County, California	Academica Soccer Fields	West	Golden Gate
CD Aguiluchos USA	Oakland, California	Raimondi Park	West	Golden Gate
AFC Ann Arbor	Ann Arbor, Michigan	Skyline High School (primary)	Midwest	Great Lakes
AFC Ann Arbor	Ypsilanti, Michigan	Scicluna Field (one match)	Midwest	Great Lakes
FC Arizona	Mesa, Arizona	John D. Riggs Stadium (primary)	West	Southwest
FC Arizona	Chandler, Arizona	Hamilton High School (one match)	West	Southwest
ASC San Diego	San Diego, California	Mission Bay Senior High School	West	Southwest
Asheville City SC	Asheville, North Carolina	Memorial Stadium	South	Southeast
Atlanta Silverbacks FC	DeKalb County, Georgia	Atlanta Silverbacks Park (primary)	South	Southeast
Atlanta Silverbacks FC	Roswell, Georgia	Blessed Trinity Catholic High School (one match)	South	Southeast
Atlantic City FC	Galloway Township, New Jersey	G. Larry James Stadium	Northeast	Keystone
FC Baltimore	Essex, Maryland	Community College of Baltimore County Essex	Northeast	Mid-Atlantic
Boca Raton FC	Delray Beach, Florida	Atlantic Community High School	South	Sunshine
Boston City FC	Malden, Massachusetts	Donovan Field at Brother Gilbert Stadium	Northeast	North Atlantic
Brooklyn Italians	Brooklyn, New York, New York	Long Island University Field	Northeast	North Atlantic
FC Brownsville	Brownsville, Texas	Brownsville Sports Park	South	Lone Star
FC Buffalo	Buffalo, New York	Robert E. Rich All-High Stadium	Midwest	East
Charlottesville Alliance FC	Charlottesville, Virginia	Charlottesville High School (primary)	Northeast	Mid-Atlantic
Charlottesville Alliance FC	Albemarle County, Virginia	Albemarle High School (one match)	Northeast	Mid-Atlantic
Chattanooga FC	Chattanooga, Tennessee	W. Max Finley Stadium	South	Southeast
Cleveland SC	University Heights, Ohio	Don Shula Stadium	Midwest	East
FC Columbus	Grandview Heights, Ohio	Bobcat Stadium	Midwest	Great Lakes
Dakota Fusion FC	Moorhead, Minnesota	Jim Gotta Stadium	Midwest	North
FC Davis	Yolo County, California	Aggie Stadium	West	Golden Gate
Demize NPSL	Springfield, Greene County, Missouri	Lake Country Soccer Cooper Stadium (primary)	South	Heartland
Demize NPSL	Waynesville, Missouri	Waynesville High School (one match)	South	Heartland
Demize NPSL	Branson, Taney County, Missouri	Pirate Stadium (one match)	South	Heartland
Detroit City FC	Hamtramck, Michigan	Keyworth Stadium	Midwest	Great Lakes
Duluth FC	Duluth, Minnesota	Public Schools Stadium	Midwest	North
East Bay FC Stompers	Hayward, California	Pioneer Stadium	West	Golden Gate
Electric City Shock SC	Scranton, Pennsylvania	Fitzpatrick Field	Northeast	Keystone
Emerald Force SC	Knoxville, Tennessee	Hackney Field at Sansom Sports Complex	South	Southeast
Erie Commodores FC	Erie, Pennsylvania	McConnell Family Stadium (primary)	Midwest	East
Erie Commodores FC	Edinboro, Pennsylvania	Sox Harrison Stadium (two matches)	Midwest	East
El Farolito	San Francisco, California	Boxer Stadium (primary)	West	Golden Gate
El Farolito	San Francisco, California	Kezar Stadium (one match)	West	Golden Gate
Fort Pitt Regiment	Slippery Rock, Pennsylvania	Mihalik-Thompson Stadium (three matches)	Midwest	East
Fort Pitt Regiment	Pittsburgh, Pennsylvania	Highmark Stadium (two matches)	Midwest	East
Fort Pitt Regiment	New Wilmington, Pennsylvania	Burry Stadium (one match)	Midwest	East
Fort Worth Vaqueros FC	Fort Worth, Texas	Farrington Field	South	Lone Star
FC Frederick	Frederick, Maryland	Thomas Athletic Field	Northeast	Mid-Atlantic
Georgia Revolution FC	McDonough, Georgia	Warhawk Stadium	South	Southeast
FC Golden State	Rose Hills, Los Angeles County, California	Rio Hondo College	West	Southwest
Grand Rapids FC	Grand Rapids, Michigan	Houseman Field	Midwest	Great Lakes
Greater Binghamton FC Thunder	Union, New York	Visions Field	Midwest	East
Greater Lowell NPSL FC	Tyngsborough, Massachusetts	Pierce Turf Field (primary)	Northeast	North Atlantic
Greater Lowell NPSL FC	Amesbury, Massachusetts	Amesbury Sports Park (one match)	Northeast	North Atlantic
Greenville FC	Greenville, South Carolina	Eugene E. Stone III Soccer Stadium	South	Southeast
Hartford City FC	New Britain, Connecticut	Central Connecticut Soccer Field	Northeast	North Atlantic
Hershey FC	Derry Township, Dauphin County, Pennsylvania	Hershey High School Soccer Stadium	Northeast	Keystone
Houston Dutch Lions FC	Conroe, Texas	Houston Dutch Lions FC Soccer Facility	South	Lone Star
Houston Regals SCA	Airline, Harris County, Texas	Houston Regals SCA Soccer Park (primary)	South	Lone Star
Houston Regals SCA	Conroe, Texas	Houston Dutch Lions FC Soccer Facility (one match)	South	Lone Star
FC Indiana	Fairfield Township, Tippecanoe County, Indiana	Legacy Sports Club	Midwest	Great Lakes
Jacksonville Armada FC	Jacksonville, Florida	Hodges Stadium	South	Sunshine
Junior Lone Star FC	Philadelphia, Pennsylvania	South Philadelphia Super Site (primary)	Northeast	Keystone
Junior Lone Star FC	Tinton Falls, New Jersey	Capelli Sports Complex (one match)	Northeast	Keystone
Kalamazoo FC	Kalamazoo, Michigan	Soisson-Rapacz-Clason Field	Midwest	Great Lakes
Katy 1895 FC	Harris County, Texas	St. John XXIII College Preparatory (primary)	South	Lone Star
Katy 1895 FC	Katy, Texas	Rhodes Stadium (one match)	South	Lone Star
Kingston Stockade FC	Kingston, New York	Robert Dietz Memorial Stadium	Northeast	North Atlantic
Kitsap Pumas	Kitsap County, Washington	Gordon Field	West	Northwest
La Crosse Aris FC	La Crosse, Wisconsin	Viterbo Sports Complex	Midwest	North
Laredo Heat	Laredo, Texas	Texas A&M International University Soccer Complex	South	Lone Star
Legacy 76	James City County, Virginia	Sanford B. Wanner Stadium	Northeast	Mid-Atlantic
Little Rock Rangers	Little Rock, Arkansas	War Memorial Stadium	South	Heartland
Med City FC	Rochester, Minnesota	Rochester Regional Stadium	Midwest	North
Miami FC 2	Miami Gardens, Florida	Saint Thomas University Soccer Field	South	Sunshine
Miami United FC	Hialeah, Florida	Ted Hendricks Stadium	South	Sunshine
Midland-Odessa Sockers FC	Midland, Texas	Grande Communications Stadium	South	Lone Star
Milwaukee Torrent	Wauwatosa, Wisconsin	Hart Park	Midwest	Great Lakes
Minneapolis City SC	Osseo, Minnesota	Osseo Senior High School (primary)	Midwest	North
Minneapolis City SC	Minnetonka, Minnesota	Hopkins High School (one match)	Midwest	North
Minnesota TwinStars FC	Minnetonka, Minnesota	Einer Anderson Stadium (four matches)	Midwest	North
Minnesota TwinStars FC	Brooklyn Park, Minnesota	Prairie Seeds Academy (three matches)	Midwest	North
FC Monmouth	Red Bank, New Jersey	Count Basie Park	Northeast	Keystone
FC Motown	Madison, New Jersey	Ranger Stadium	Northeast	Keystone
FC Mulhouse Portland	Portland, Oregon	Buckman Field (primary)	West	Northwest
FC Mulhouse Portland	Vancouver, Washington	Kiggins Bowl (two matches)	West	Northwest
Napa Valley 1839 FC	Napa, California	Dodd Stadium	West	Golden Gate
Naples United FC	Collier County, Florida	Palmetto Ridge High School	South	Sunshine
Inter Nashville FC	Antioch, Nashville, Tennessee	International Indoor Soccer Complex	South	Southeast
New Jersey Copa FC	West Windsor Township, New Jersey	Mercer County Community College	Northeast	Keystone
New Orleans Jesters	New Orleans, Louisiana	Pan American Stadium	South	Southeast
New York Athletic Club	Westchester County, New York	New York Athletic Club Travers Island	Northeast	North Atlantic
New York Cosmos B	Manhattan, New York, New York	Rocco B. Commisso Soccer Stadium (five matches)	Northeast	North Atlantic
New York Cosmos B	Hempstead, New York	Hofstra University Soccer Stadium (three matches)	Northeast	North Atlantic
New York Cosmos B	Hempstead, New York	James M. Shuart Stadium (one match)	Northeast	North Atlantic
Northern Virginia United FC	Leesburg, Virginia	Cropp Metcalfe Park	Northeast	Mid-Atlantic
Orange County FC	Irvine, California	Championship Soccer Stadium (primary)	West	Southwest
Orange County FC	Irvine, California	Portola High School (one match)	West	Southwest
Orange County FC	Costa Mesa, California	Vanguard University (one match)	West	Southwest
OSA FC	Tukwila, Washington	Starfire Stadium	West	Northwest
Oxnard Guerreros FC	Oxnard, California	Del Sol Stadium	West	Southwest
Ozark FC	Rogers, Arkansas	Veterans Park (two matches)	South	Heartland
Ozark FC	Springdale, Washington County, Arkansas	Jarrell Williams Bulldog Stadium (one match)	South	Heartland
Ozark FC	Springdale, Washington County, Arkansas	Har-Ber High School (one match)	South	Heartland
Ozark FC	Benton County, Arkansas	Sugar Creek Soccer Park (one match)	South	Heartland
Palm Beach United	Palm Beach Gardens, Florida	The Benjamin School	South	Sunshine
PDX FC	Portland, Oregon	Hilken Community Stadium (three matches)	West	Northwest
PDX FC	Lake Oswego, Oregon	Lakeridge High School (three matches)	West	Northwest
Rhode Island Reds F.C.	Johnston, Rhode Island	Johnston Senior High School	Northeast	North Atlantic
Riverside Coras USA	Riverside, California	Riverside Stadium (primary)	West	Southwest
Riverside Coras USA	Riverside, California	John W. North High School (one match)	West	Southwest
Rochester Lancers	Rochester, Monroe County, New York	Marina Auto Stadium	Midwest	East
Sacramento Gold	Rosemont, Sacramento County, California	Capital Christian School	West	Golden Gate
Saint Louis Club Atletico	St. Louis, Missouri	St. Mary's Stadium	South	Heartland
Seacoast United Mariners	Portland, Maine	Fitzpatrick Stadium (primary)	Northeast	North Atlantic
Seacoast United Mariners	Yarmouth, Maine	Lewis Field (one match)	Northeast	North Atlantic
Seacoast United Mariners	Brunswick, Maine	Whittier Field (one match)	Northeast	North Atlantic
Shreveport Rafters FC	Shreveport, Louisiana	Independence Stadium	South	Lone Star
Sioux Falls Thunder FC	Sioux Falls, South Dakota	McEneaney Field (four matches)	Midwest	North
Sioux Falls Thunder FC	Sioux Falls, South Dakota	USF Soccer Field (two matches)	Midwest	North
Sioux Falls Thunder FC	Sioux Falls, South Dakota	Yankton Trail Park (one match)	Midwest	North
Sonoma County Sol	Petaluma, California	Casa Grande High School	West	Golden Gate
Spokane SC Shadow	Spokane, Washington	Spokane Falls Community College (primary)	West	Northwest
Spokane SC Shadow	Spokane County, Washington	Spokane Shadow Soccer Complex (two matches)	West	Northwest
Storm FC	Pembroke Pines, Florida	Pembroke Pines Charter High School	South	Sunshine
Syracuse FC	Onondaga, New York	Lazer Stadium	Midwest	East
Temecula FC	Temecula, California	Chaparral High School	West	Southwest
Torch FC	Towamencin Township, Pennsylvania	Dock Mennonite Academy (three matches)	Northeast	Keystone
Torch FC	Nockamixon Township, Pennsylvania	Palisades High School (two matches)	Northeast	Keystone
TSF FC	Wayne, New Jersey	Alumni Field	Northeast	North Atlantic
Tulsa Athletic	Tulsa, Oklahoma	Veterans Park	South	Heartland
Tyler FC	Smith County, Texas	Hayes Soccer Fields	South	Lone Star
Viejos Son Los Trapos FC	Saint Paul, Minnesota	James Griffin Stadium (primary)	Midwest	North
Viejos Son Los Trapos FC	Saint Paul, Minnesota	Highland Park High School (one match)	Midwest	North
Virginia Beach City FC	Virginia Beach, Virginia	Virginia Beach Sportsplex	Northeast	Mid-Atlantic
West Chester United SC	West Chester, Pennsylvania	West Chester Area Sports Complex	Northeast	Keystone
FC Wichita	Wichita, Kansas	Carpenter Stadium (primary)	South	Heartland
FC Wichita	Wichita, Kansas	Trinity Academy Stadium (one match)	South	Heartland

== Season overview ==
=== Influx of NASL talent ===
Prior to the start of the season, the NPSL became a beneficiary of the uncertainty surrounding the 2018 North American Soccer League season, since three NASL clubs decided to field many of their Division II-quality players in NPSL matches. First, Jacksonville Armada FC owner Robert Palmer announced that the team would compete in the NPSL in 2018, replacing the club's reserve side, Jacksonville Armada U-23. Palmer said the roster would include five or six players from the NASL squad and that the players would be using the NPSL games as a preseason training opportunity until the then expected start of the NASL season in August.

The following day, Miami FC CEO Sean Flynn announced the formation of a reserve squad, Miami FC 2, which entered the NPSL as an expansion team. Flynn said that he created Miami FC 2 to provide Miami FC's players with live match action instead of being confined to training as they waited for the start of the NASL season.

On February 27, 2018, the NASL announced that it had cancelled its 2018 season; it also announced that three of its teams, Miami FC, Jacksonville Armada FC and the New York Cosmos would be fielding teams in NPSL. Shortly thereafter, Carlos Mendes was hired as head coach of the New York Cosmos B, the organization's reserve side, which had competed in the NPSL since 2015. Within days the Cosmos B signed Danny Szetela, Chris Wingert, Bljedi Bardic, Jonathan Borrajo, Alexis Velela and Wojciech Wojcik.

=== Other developments ===
Virginia Beach City FC and D.C. United of Major League Soccer (MLS) announced a partnership aimed at creating opportunities for young players in the Tidewater region to develop into professionals.

The NPSL became the second U.S.-based league (after MLS) to conduct advanced training for referees. NPSL director of officials Paul Scott said, "[W]e need to contribute in a meaningful way in the training of the officials, if we want our product to improve."

Cindy Spera was promoted from NPSL director of operations to the position of managing director.

The NPSL reached an agreement with Select Sport for the Danish sports equipment manufacturer to be the league's official match ball sponsor.

The NPSL announced that A.S. Los Angeles would join the league as an expansion club for the 2019 season. The team will play in the Southwest Conference. Harry Tachian is the club's majority owner and serves as its chairman and president.

=== NPSL at the U.S. Open Cup ===
The United States Soccer Federation's Open Cup Committee initially allocated 19 berths in the 2018 U.S. Open Cup to NPSL teams. NPSL expansion club El Farolito had made it through the open division qualifying process. However, tournament rules require that a participating team remain a playing member in good standing of the same league from the date of the open division entry deadline through the date of the U.S. Open Cup Final. By jumping from the San Francisco Soccer Football League to the NPSL, El Farolito had disqualified itself.

As a Division II league, the NASL was entitled to send all its U.S.-based clubs to the U.S. Open Cup in the past. However, the USSF informed the three NASL clubs playing (either directly or through a reserve team) in the NPSL in 2018, that they were not eligible to participate in the tournament, since NPSL teams qualify based on the previous season's results. Neither the New York Cosmos B nor the Jacksonville Armada U-23 were ranked highly enough by the NPSL to qualify, and Miami FC 2 was new to the league. The three clubs appealed this ruling, requesting berths in the tournament. The USSF ultimately reversed its decision and allowed the three teams to participate, bringing the total number of NPSL teams in the tournament to 22.

A play-in round was added to the U.S. Open Cup for the New York Cosmos B, the Jacksonville Armada FC and Miami FC 2. Their opponents were selected from NPSL and Premier Development League (PDL) qualifiers based on geographical proximity and a random draw. The three selected teams were given the option to host the matches, which all three elected to do. The New York Cosmos B were drawn against fellow NPSL side the Brooklyn Italians, while the Jacksonville Armada FC and Miami FC 2 drew PDL clubs The Villages SC and FC Miami City, respectively. The Italians defeated the Cosmos, while the Armada topped The Villages, and Miami FC 2 beat FC Miami City.

In the first round of the U.S. Open Cup, NPSL clubs had seven wins in 12 matches against PDL teams and won four of seven matches with local qualifiers. One first-round match pitted two NPSL teams against each other. The 12 NPSL teams advancing to the second round was a new record high for the league and four more than in 2017.

NPSL clubs lost seven of their nine second-round matches against United Soccer League (USL) opponents. Elm City Express defeated Seacoast United Phantoms in the only second-round match featuring NPSL and PDL teams. One second-round match was an all-NPSL Miami derby with Miami United FC beating Miami FC 2.

In the third round of the U.S. Open Cup, Elm City Express fell to USL side Charleston Battery, and FC Wichita fell to local qualifier NTX Rayados. Miami United FC secured a road win against fellow Florida NPSL side Jacksonville Armada to become the only NPSL team to advance past the third round of the tournament.

Miami United FC hosted Orlando City SC of MLS in the fourth round of the U.S. Open Cup. Orlando City had 70% of the ball possession and was never really challenged in a 3–0 victory. The Orlando City goalkeeper need to make only one save.

Overall, NPSL clubs had 16 wins and 18 losses against non-NPSL opponents in the U.S. Open Cup. They split their eight matches against local qualifiers, won 10 of 15 matches against PDL teams, lost eight of 10 matches against USL clubs and lost their only match against an MLS squad.

=== NPSL at the Hank Steinbrecher Cup ===
The 2017 NPSL champion Elm City Express represented the league at the 2018 Hank Steinbrecher Cup for the title U.S. National Amateur Champions. Matches were played at Veterans Memorial Stadium in New Britain, Connecticut, less than an hour's drive from the Express's home in New Haven.

The Express lost its semifinal match, 2–0, to defending Steinbrecher Cup winner Michigan Bucks of the PDL.

In the third-place match, the Express conceded a goal in second-half stoppage time and fell to the 2017 National Amateur Cup champions Lansdowne Bhoys FC of the Cosmopolitan Soccer League, 2–1.

=== Regular season ===
In the Keystone Conference, FC Motown started the season with nine straight wins before dropping a 2–1 decision at home to West Chester United SC in their final match. The loss eventually cost FC Motown home-field advantage in the Northeast Region Final against the New York Cosmos B. Torch FC occupied the bottom of the Keystone Conference, losing all 10 of their matches and scoring only eight goals while conceding 50.

The New York Cosmos B dominated the North Atlantic Conference, winning all 10 of their matches and conceding only eight goals while scoring 40. After starting the season 2–3–2, defending NPSL champion Elm City Express won its final three matches, culminating with a 6–4 road win over the Rhode Island Reds F.C. in a winner-take-all showdown for the final North Atlantic Conference playoff berth. In five home matches, the Seacoast United Mariners went pointless, were shut out four times and were outscored, 14–2. The Mariners suffered shutout losses in three of their five road matches but managed draws in the other two.

FC Baltimore and Northern Virginia United FC entered their final regular-season matches with identical 6–2–1 records. FC Baltimore took the top seed in the Mid-Atlantic Conference with an 8–2 home victory over Charlottesville Alliance FC, while Northern Virginia United lost on the road to Virginia Beach City FC, 7–1. A road draw against Charlottesville Alliance in its final regular-season match was just enough for FC Frederick to win a standings tiebreaker over Virginia Beach City and claim the final Mid-Atlantic playoff berth.

The Laredo Heat finished with the best overall regular-season record in the NPSL and was the only team in the South Region with a perfect record, outscoring its opponents, 37–4. The Heat conceded only one goal in five home matches while scoring 20. The Shreveport Rafters FC claimed the second playoff berth in the Blue Group of the Lone Star Conference, when Katy 1895 FC suffered a 9–0 home loss to the Houston Dutch Lions FC in their final regular-season match. Tyler FC lost all 10 of their matches, scoring just seven goals while conceding 54. In their opening match of the season hosting the Shreveport Rafters, Tyler scored a late second-half goal to cut their deficit to 2–1 but could not get the equalizer. They were never within a goal of the winning score for the rest of the season, and they were shut out five times.

The top three clubs in the Sunshine Conference made the conference the most competitive in the league. Eventual NPSL champions Miami FC 2, who topped the Sunshine Conference table, had a loss and three draws in its four regular-season matches against second- and third-place finishers Jacksonville Armada and Miami United. However, Miami FC 2 won all eight of their matches against their other four conference opponents. Both matches between the Armada and Miami United ended in draws. At the bottom of the conference, Storm FC scored only one goal all season. It came at home against Naples United FC in a 1–1 draw, the only match Storm did not lose. Storm was outscored 27–1 at home and 14–0 on the road.

After starting the season 2–3–0, the Little Rock Rangers closed by winning their final five matches. However, it was not enough to catch FC Wichita in the Heartland Conference. Wichita started the season 7–0–0 before stumbling to the finish line with two losses (including one to the Rangers) and a draw in their final three matches. Ozark FC lost all five of their home matches and were outscored, 9–2. Ozark was outscored, 13–2, on the road but did manage a draw against Saint Louis Club Atletico.

Chattanooga FC went 4–0–3 in the first half of the season and 4–2–1 in the second half to take the top seed in the Southeast Conference. The Atlanta Silverbacks were 4–4–2 in their first 10 matches and 3–0–1 in their final four to take second place. Chattanooga and the Silverbacks met in the final match of the regular season and played to a 1–1 draw at Atlanta Silverbacks Park, but Chattanooga entered the match with a four-point lead in the standings.

Minneapolis City SC was the only undefeated team in the Midwest Region, posting a record of 10–0–4 to win the North Conference title. They were 6–0–1 at home. LaCrosse Aris FC went winless at 0–13–1. Oddly, LaCrosse Aris earned their only point of the season with a scoreless draw at home against conference champion Minneapolis City.

AFC Ann Arbor won the Great Lakes Conference title and claimed the second seed in the Midwest Region playoffs with a 9–1–2 record, losing only on the road to second-place Grand Rapids FC. FC Columbus won both of its matches against Grand Rapids, who started the season 5–1–1 in their first seven games but closed by going 2–2–1 in their final five, including the pair of losses to Columbus. Meanwhile, Columbus followed a 1–2–2 start by going 5–1–0 over the next six games to put themselves in position to take the conference's second playoff berth. With Grand Rapids having completed their schedule with a 7–3–2 record, Columbus was 6–3–2 and holding the tiebreaker over Grand Rapids heading into their final match at the 2–5–4 Milwaukee Torrent. The Torrent got the better of Columbus, 1–0, with a goal in the 87th minute and denied them a trip to the postseason. The late-season stumble by Grand Rapids cost them home-field advantage in their Midwest Region Quarterfinal match against Duluth FC. At the bottom of the Great Lakes Conference, FC Indiana lost all 12 of their matches, scoring only four goals while conceding 75. Indiana was outscored on the road, 42–0, in six matches. In Indiana's only match decided by a single goal, the Torrent scored in the 78th minute to break a 2–2 tie and held on for the win.

With the East Conference title on the line, the Erie Commodores FC hosted Cleveland SC in the final match of the regular season for both clubs, who each had identical 7–1–3 records. Cleveland held the standings tiebreaker and needed only a draw for the conference championship, because it had won the first match between the teams, 3–2. Cleveland's 70th-minute goal was not enough to overcome two first-half tallies by the Commodores who held on for the win despite playing more than half the match with only 10 men. Cleveland rested four of their regular starters with injuries, all of whom were expected to be available for the opening playoff match. With Ann Arbor likely to win as they finished up their regular season at home against pointless Indiana, the Commodores and Cleveland were nearly assured at game time that they would be playing each other in the West Region Quarterfinals, and the East Conference champions would host. After starting the season 3–3–3, the Rochester Lancers won their final three matches, but it was not enough to challenge the Commodores and Cleveland for a playoff berth. The Greater Binghamton FC Thunder lost all 12 of its matches, scoring nine goals and conceding 66.

FC Golden State hosted ASC San Diego in a showdown for the Southwest Conference title in the final match of the regular season for both clubs. Golden State entered the match in first place by one point with an 8–1–2 record, losing only at San Diego. ASC San Diego was in second place at 8–2–1, having lost both their matches against Orange County FC. After Golden State built a 2–0 lead, ASC San Diego struck in the 71st, 76th and 79th minutes to win the match, 3–2, and claimed the Southwest Conference championship. The first and third goals in ASC San Diego's dramatic comeback were tallied by their leading goalscorer, Amani Walker. Two days later, Orange County, at 7–1–3, had a chance to claim second place in the Southwest Conference and avoid the play-in game, if they could earn a road win against Riverside Coras USA. The second-place team in the Southwest Conference would also have home-field advantage in the West Region Quarterfinals. Orange County's Peter Gregory scored his second goal of the match in the 76th minute to break a 2–2 deadlock that had stood since halftime. However, Coras tied the match five minutes later on an own goal, the second Orange County had conceded in the match, and the game ended in a draw.

El Farolito went undefeated at 9–0–5 to win the Golden Gate Conference championship. After starting the season 0–3–2, the Sonoma County Sol finished 7–1–1 to claim the final Golden Gate Conference playoff berth. The Sol and the East Bay FC Stompers entered their June 9 match with identical 3–4–3 records. A go-ahead goal in the 68th minute by NPSL leading goalscorer Omar Nuño was the difference in a 3–2 home win for the Sol. Following the win over the Stompers, the Sol outscored its opponents, 16–0, in its final three matches. FC Davis started the season 3–1–5 but lost their final five matches to fall out of the playoff picture.

Spokane SC Shadow and FC Mulhouse Portland were the only two teams in the Northwest Conference with winning records and claimed the conference's two playoff berths. The Shadow went undefeated at 7–0–5 to claim the conference championship. In head-to-head matchups of the conference leaders, the Shadow had a win and a draw in its two home matches with Portland, which were played on consecutive days, and the only match played in Portland ended in a tie.

=== Playoffs ===
With some conferences still playing regular-season matches, the NPSL postseason got underway on June 30, with the Southwest Conference Play-in Game. An early goal by Jonathan Bryant put Orange County in the lead, but a red card issued to Michael Bryant in the 31st minute forced them to play down a man. Daniel Crisostomo doubled Orange County's lead in the 70th minute. A dangerous challenge and a scuffle in the 82nd minute resulted in two red cards for Arizona and a yellow card for Orange County. Cody Shelton scored in the 90th minute to seal Orange County's 3–0 victory. Bennett Sneddon kept the clean sheet.

The Lone Star Conference Quarterfinals were played on July 7. The sixth-seeded Shreveport Rafters FC pushed the Houston Dutch Lions FC to extra time with the match scoreless. Jacob Powell got the Dutch Lions on the board in the third minute of extra time. Ángel Lopez followed with a goal in the final minute before the first half of extra time expired. Dylan Armstrong rounded out the scoring in the 115th minute to give the Dutch Lions a 3–0 victory. Sullivan Lauderdale earned the 120-minute shutout.

The Fort Worth Vaqueros FC dominated FC Brownsville, 5–0, in the other Lone Star Conference Quarterfinal. Jamie Lovegrove and Kallé Soné each contributed a brace, and Jesse Miralrio scored the other goal. Grant Makela kept a clean sheet for the Vaqueros.

The West Region Quarterfinals were played on July 7 and 8. El Farolito got a first-half goal from Arnhold Rivas to take the lead over the Sonoma County Sol but had to play with 10 men after Ademar Rodríguez drew a red card in the 62nd minute. The Sol could not get the equalizer, and Camilo Campo provided another goal in the 90th minute to give El Farolito a 2–0 win. Mario Martinez recorded the shutout.

For the third time in three matches this season, Orange County FC defeated ASC San Diego. San Diego's leading scorer Amani Walker put them on the board first in the 51st minute. However, Jose Montes de Oca and Daniel Crisostomo both scored in the 58th minute to turn the match around. Dakota Collins provided insurance for Orange County in the 84th minute, and Orange County secured a 3–1 victory over the Southwest Conference champions.

The Northwest Conference champions Spokane SC Shadow got a goal from Micheal Ramos in the 7th minute of their West Region Quarterfinal to take an early lead. However, Christian Thyron replied a minute later for FC Mulhouse Portland. Fred Braun gave Portland a 2–1 lead in the 40th minute, and the Shadow was unable to equalize, suffering its first loss of the season.

FC Golden State got goals from Gabriel Henrique Silva, Allisson, Gustavo Villalobos and Jose Perez-Flores and cruised to a 4–2 West Region Quarterfinal victory over CD Aguiluchos USA. Simon Rawnsley and Anthony De Souza scored goals for Aguiluchos.

The Southeast Conference Quarterfinals were played on July 10. Both lower seeds, who had losing records during the regular season, prevailed with road wins. The Georgia Revolution FC upset the New Orleans Jesters, 3–2, on goals by Ehjayson Henry, Isaac Promise and Jumar Oakley. Oliver Roberts scored both goals for the Jesters. Wesley Sprague saved a Thomas Peers penalty kick in the 73rd minute to keep the Revolution in the lead, 2–1.

Asheville City SC got goals from Siavash Jamehdar, Elma Nfor and Tyson Hichman to win the other Southwest Conference Quarterfinal over Inter Nashville FC. Jonathan Remond scored in the 90th minute to spoil the shutout.

Nine NPSL playoff matches were played on July 11. Led by two goals from Christopher Katona, FC Motown beat FC Monmouth, 4–1, in the Keystone Conference Semifinals. Walter Calderon and Christopher Riordan also scored for Motown. Chase Covello scored Monmouth's goal on a free kick from just outside the box that deflected off Motown's wall.

In the other Keystone Conference Semifinal, Junior Lone Star FC fell behind West Chester United SC, 2–1, when they conceded an own goal in the 41st minute. Three minutes into the second half, Junior Lone Star tied the match on Anthony Allison's second goal of the game. Extra time did not settle the matter, and West Chester United advanced on penalty kicks, 4–3. Charles Wilson's goal in the 12th minute had given United an early 1–0 lead.

The New York Cosmos B and defending NPSL champion Elm City Express each held one-goal leads in the first half of their North Atlantic Conference Semifinal match. Bljedi Bardic scored both Cosmos B goals, and Tyler Carlos had both tallies for the Express. Neither team scored in the second half. The Cosmos B broke through in extra time on goals by Wojciech Wojcik in the 111th minute and Zaire Bartley in the 112th minute. Since the Cosmos B had the best regular-season record in the Northeast Region, the berth in the North Atlantic Conference Final guaranteed them a spot in the region semifinals.

James Thristino's hat trick led the Brooklyn Italians to a 3–0 victory over Hartford City FC in the other North Atlantic Conference Semifinal. Michael Bernardi kept a clean sheet for the Italians.

J. C. Banks and Ciarán Kilduff each had a brace to lead the Jacksonville Armada FC to a 4–1 win over Miami United FC in the Sunshine Conference Semifinal. Nicolas Micoli scored for United in the 26th minute to tie the match, 1–1, which was where the teams stood at the half. The four goals was the most conceded by Miami United in an NPSL or U.S. Open Cup match in 2018. The win was the first for the Armada in 2018 over Miami United in their fourth match. Miami United won at Jacksonville in the third round of the U.S. Open Cup. Both regular-season matches between the teams ended in draws.

After Arthur Rogers scored in the 41st minute to give the Houston Dutch Lions FC a lead in the Lone Star Conference Semifinals, the Midland-Odessa Sockers FC temporarily rescued their season, when Maxiliano Galizzi scored in the second minute of second-half stoppage time. Yinka Lawal broke through for the Dutch Lions, scoring in the 113th minute. Jacob Powell added an insurance goal in the second minute of extra-time stoppage time. Two minutes later, Andres Felipe Rodriguez-Becerra scored from the penalty spot for the Sockers, but the referee blew the final whistle shortly thereafter.

The Laredo Heat got a brace from Gabriel Rodriguez, and Rafael Montabes added a goal to lead the Heat to a 3–1 Lone Star Conference Semifinal win over the Fort Worth Vaqueros FC. Declan O'Shea scored for the Vaqueros in the 59th minute to spoil the shutout.

The Little Rock Rangers and Tulsa Athletic were engaged in a scoreless duel in the Heartland Conference Semifinals until Donald Benamna scored in the 90th minute to give the Rangers a 1–0 victory. Walid Birrou kept a clean sheet for the Rangers.

Matt Clare's brace led FC Wichita to a 4–0 Heartland Conference Semifinal win over Saint Louis Club Atletico. Leonardo Perez and late substitute Teylor Cubero also scored for Wichita in a game free from disciplinary actions. Mark Weir recorded the shutout.

Three NPSL playoff matches were contested on July 12. Saidou Toure scored in the 60th minute to give FC Frederick, who qualified for the postseason by winning a standings tiebreaker, a lead over Northern Virginia United FC in the Mid-Atlantic Conference Semifinal. Collin Verfurth responded with the equalizer three minutes later, but that was all the scoring for regulation time. United went in front in the 97th minute, when Christopher Welsh scored on a penalty kick, but Brian Flatter, who entered the match as a substitute after the Welsh goal, responded for Frederick three minutes later, and the match went to penalty kicks. Bilal Hassane put home the winner on Frederick's fifth kick, giving them the shootout, 4–3. Three of the four players who scored for Frederick in the shootout entered the match as substitutes. Northern Virginia United had won both regular-season matches between the clubs.

The Georgia Revolution FC held top seed Chattanooga FC scoreless in their Southeast Conference Semifinal match, until Juan Hernandez-Mendizabal curled a free kick around the Revolution's wall to give Chattanooga a 1–0 lead in the 73rd minute. Joao Costa added an insurance goal in the 89th minute, and Philip D'Amico kept a clean sheet in Chattanooga's 2–0 victory.

Asheville City SC kept the Atlanta Silverbacks FC off the scoreboard in the other Southeast Conference Semifinal, until Aaron Walker converted a penalty kick in the 68th minute, and Nyambi Jabang, who was returning to action after a hamstring injury and entered the match as a halftime substitute, followed with a goal on a counterattack two minutes later, that bounced off the goalpost and into the net. Bryce Billington recorded the shutout in a 2–0 win.

The Midwest Region Quarterfinals were played on July 13 and 14. The Erie Commodores FC hosted Cleveland SC at McConnell Family Stadium for the second time in six days. The Commodores had won the previous match and claimed the East Conference title and home-field advantage in this clash. All four regular starters Cleveland had rested in the previous match returned from their injuries. After Vincent Bell scored the second of his three goals in the 56th minute to give Cleveland a 2–0 lead, Jacob Alatorre received a part of yellow cards a minute later to put the Commodores down a man. Antonio Manfut's goal in the 63rd minute put Cleveland up, 3–0, and Bell struck again in the 76th minute to complete the scoring in a 4–0 Cleveland victory. Austin Solomon got his second yellow card in the 89th minute, and the Commodores finished the match playing with only nine men. Marijo Musa kept a clean sheet.

Duluth FC went ahead of Grand Rapids FC in the other Midwest Region Quarterfinal, 2–0, on Ryan Tyrer's header off a corner kick in the 46th minute and David Rice' goal in the 51st minute. However, Grand Rapids mounted a furious comeback, getting goals from Matthew Whelan in the 83rd minute and Kenroy Howell in the second minute of stoppage time to tie the score and send the match to extra time. In the 118th minute, Duluth substituted Alberto Ciroi for NPSL Golden Glove winner Jan Hoffelner in preparation for a penalty kick shootout. Earlier in extra time, they had substituted Ricardo Ramos, who was returning from an injury, into the match for his penalty kick prowess. After a scoreless 30 minutes of extra time, the teams went to penalty kicks. Ciroi saved the efforts of Trent Vegter and Joe Broekhuizen on Grand Rapids's third and fourth kicks, respectively. After David Rice hit the crossbar on Duluth's fourth penalty kick, captain Kyle Farrar's goal made it 4–3 and sent Duluth to the region semifinals.

==== Conference finals ====
All seven conferences that have conference championship matches staged them on July 14. After Joshua Fawole put FC Baltimore in the lead in the 18th minute, FC Frederick responded with goals by Justin Lee in the 26th minute and Graham Guidry in the 47th minute to gain the lead. After Shawn Baker drew a red card in the 86th minute for serious foul play, Frederick was forced to weather the storm for the balance of regulation and five minutes of stoppage time as Baltimore sought an equalizer. Frederick held on to earn an upset victory. Frederick, who qualified for the playoffs on the regular season's final day by a standings tiebreaker and had to overcome a one-goal deficit in extra time and win a penalty-kick shootout in the conference semifinal against an opponent that had beaten them twice in the regular-season, had overcome the odds to beat Baltimore, to whom they had also lost both regular-season matches, and win the Mid-Atlantic Conference title. The loss by Baltimore meant they needed both New York Cosmos B and FC Motown to win their conference titles in order to reach the Northeast Region Semifinals as the wildcard.

West Chester United SC, who had been responsible for FC Motown's only regular-season loss, took an early lead over Motown in the Keystone Conference Final on Charles Wilson's goal in the 28th minute. The score remained 1–0, until Lucas Terci equalized for Motown in the 90th minute. No goals were scored in extra time, and the match went to penalty kicks. Down, 4–3, in the shootout and needing a goal on their fifth kick, United goalkeeper Charlie Sales failed to score and gave Motown the Keystone Conference championship and a trip to the region semifinals. The loss eliminated West Chester United, who had 2.1 average points per game, since FC Baltimore, who averaged 2.2, had already lost the Mid-Atlantic Conference Final.

James Thristino's goal in the 67th minute gave the Brooklyn Italians a lead over the New York Cosmos B. Zaire Bartley scored an equalizer for the Cosmos B in the 75th minute. However, two minutes later, Rafael Garcia was issued a red card for violent conduct, and the Cosmos B were forced to play with 10 men. Neither team was able to score in the balance of the second half or extra time, and the match went to penalty kicks. After Kevin Tenjo saved Thomas Suchecki's effort on the Italians' fourth kick, Jonathan Borrajo scored to give the Cosmos B a 5–3 win in the shootout and the North Atlantic Conference title. The Italians and FC Baltimore had identical 7–2–1 regular-season records. Baltimore won the tiebreaker for the Northeast Region wildcard on average goal difference per game at 2.7 compared with 2.2.

Kris Tyrpak's goal in the eighth minute staked Miami FC 2 to a 1–0 lead over the Jacksonville Armada FC in the Sunshine Conference Final. The Armada tied the match in the 29th minute on Ciarán Kilduff's goal. Five minutes later, Darío Suárez gave Miami FC 2 another lead. Tyrpak scored again in the 53rd minute, and Miami FC 2 went on to a 3–1 victory and the Sunshine Conference championship in a game free from disciplinary actions by the referee.

Philip D'Amico of Chattanooga FC and Bryce Billington of the Atlanta Silverbacks FC both kept clean sheets for 120 minutes. D'Amico saved Aaron Walker's penalty kick in 112th minute to preserve his shutout. Soren Yuhaschek swept away a 78th minute shot, which had been deflected by D'Amico but trickled past him, just before the ball reached the goal line, to ensure the Southeast Conference Final would be decided by penalty kicks. On the Silverbacks's third and fourth penalty kicks, D'Amico made saves but was called for moving before the ball was kicked. The Silverbacks scored on both re-kicks. With the shootout tied at 5, Cameron Woodfin's shot went over the crossbar on Chattanooga's sixth kick. Mohammed Issahaku followed with a goal to win the shootout for the Silverbacks, 6–5, and give Atlanta the Southeast Conference title.

FC Wichita and the Little Rock Rangers also played 120 scoreless minutes in the Heartland Conference Final. Mark Weir recorded the shutout for Wichita, and Walid Birrou kept the clean sheet for the Rangers. Andres Ochoa failed to score on Wichita's third kick, and Donald Benamna scored to make it 5-for-5 for the Rangers and give them a 5–3 win in the shootout and the Heartland Conference title.

Arthur Rogers scored two first-half goals, the second on a penalty kick, to put the Houston Dutch Lions FC in front of the Laredo Heat in the Lone Star Conference Final. The Heat battled back on goals by Ziyad Fares in the 67th minute and Petteri Pietola in the 74th minute to send the match to extra time. Tor Trosten scored twice in extra time, in the 96th and 101st minutes, to give the Heat the lead. Yinka Lawal answered for the Dutch Lions in the 104th minute, but Houston could not get an equalizer, and the Heat won the Lone Star Conference championship.

Home teams won four of the seven conference championship matches. Four of the seven conference championship matches were decided by penalty kicks, and one more was decided in extra time. Three teams that were trailing in conference championship matches scored equalizers in the 74th minute or later and ended up winning their matches.

==== Region semifinals ====
The West Region Semifinals were contested on July 14 and 15. El Farolito fell behind FC Mulhouse Portland on a Reed McKenna goal in the 21st minute. Luis Galeano, a 55th-minute substitute, added an insurance goal in the 77th minute. With Portland leading, 2–0, Farolito goalkeeper Mario Martinez saved a penalty kick to keep his team in the game. Following the save, Farolito pressed and forced Portland goalkeeper Scott Dalrymple to make several saves and earn his clean sheet and a road victory.

Alessandro Canale's brace led Orange County FC to a 4–2 road win over FC Golden State in a West Region Semifinal match. Golden State got on the board first when Gabriel Henrique Silva scored in the 22nd minute, but Canale's goals in the 33rd and 63rd minutes sandwiched a Dakota Collins tally in the 61st minute. Adrien Perez scored in the 84th minute to cut Golden State's deficit to 3–2, but Kevin Jeon's 90th-minute goal sealed the victory for Orange County.

The South Region Semifinals were played on July 17. Miami FC 2 and the Atlanta Silverbacks FC exchanged first-half goals. Sean McFarlane Jr. opened the scoring for Miami in the 22nd minute, and Thierry Jules answered in the 36th minute. Atlanta's David Koloko drew a red card for serious foul play in the 79th minute, and Miami capitalized on the man advantage two minutes later, when Kris Tyrpak scored the winner in a 2–1 victory.

The Little Rock Rangers took an early lead over the Laredo Heat in the other South Region Semifinal, when Trevor Reed scored in the 31st minute. The Heat got the equalizer from Rodave Murray in the 87th minute to send the game to extra time. Donald Benamna's goal in the 115th minute gave the Rangers a 2–1 upset victory and handed the Heat its first loss of the season.

The Northeast Region Semifinals were contested on July 18. The New York Cosmos B got a brace from Zaire Bartley and a clean sheet from Kevin Tenjo to beat FC Frederick, 2–0.

A brace by Daryl Kavanagh and a goal by Christopher Katona led FC Motown to a 3–0 victory over FC Baltimore in the other Northeast Region Semifinal. Abdou Karim Danso earned the shutout.

The final four teams in the Midwest Region met in Ann Arbor, Michigan on July 20, for the region semifinals. Duluth FC took an early lead over the region's top seed, Minneapolis City SC, on a 17th-minute goal by their captain, Kyle Farrar. In the opening moments of the match, Minneapolis City starter Abdallah Bah was removed from the field, and City was unable to get a substitute on for him for just over 15 minutes. They played a man down until Farrar's goal, after which they sent Martin Browne Jr. into the game to replace Bah. After they returned to full strength, Branden McGarrity responded for Minneapolis City in the 36th minute, and the score remained tied, until Ricardo Ramos converted a penalty kick in the 115th minute, giving Duluth a 2–1 victory.

Serge Gamwanya scored a goal in the 55th minute, and AFC Ann Arbor made it hold up in a 1–0 Midwest Region Quarterfinal victory over Cleveland SC. Nick Barry kept the clean sheet for Ann Arbor.

==== Region finals ====
All four region final matches were contested on July 21. Miami FC 2 cruised to a 3–0 victory over the Little Rock Rangers to win the South Region championship. Jaime Chavez, Dylan Mares and Darío Suárez each scored for Miami FC 2, and Mario Daniel Vega earned the shutout.

Walter Calderon, Christopher Katona and Dilly Duka (on a penalty kick) each had a second-half goal to give FC Motown a 3–0 lead over the New York Cosmos B. Ivan Berterame scored two goals for the Cosmos B during second-half stoppage time. Seconds before the referee blew the final whistle, Abdoukarim Danso dove to his left to get a hand on Darwin Espinal's free kick, and the rebound attempt by Joey Sanchez went wide with the flag up for offside anyway. Motown held on for a 3–2 win and the Northeast Region championship.

Ryan Tyrer opened the scoring for Duluth FC in the 12th minute of the Midwest Region Final against AFC Ann Arbor. Chrispinus Odhiambo answered in the 23rd minute, but Ann Arbor conceded an own goal a minute later to fall behind again. Duluth increased their lead to 3–1, when their captain, Kyle Farrar, scored in the 39th minute. Jack Cawley's 42nd-minute goal brought Ann Arbor within a goal at the half. Azaad Liadi kept Ann Arbor's hopes alive with a goal in the forth minute of second-half stoppage time. Just as they had in their region quarterfinal match, Duluth substituted Alberto Ciroi for NPSL Golden Glove winner Jan Hoffelner in the 118th minute in preparation for a penalty kick shootout. In the second minute of extra-time stoppage time, Ciroi took a kick to the head from Odhiambo, who was shown a yellow card. Three other players drew yellow cards in the ensuing scuffle. Neither team scored in extra time. In the shootout, Ciroi saved Matthieu Braem's attempt on Ann Arbor's second kick and Michael Shaikly's effort on their fourth kick. Ann Arbor goalkeeper Nick Barry extended the shootout by saving Aidan Hill's attempt on Duluth's fourth kick. Kyle Breitmeyer's shot hit the crossbar and then Ciroi's back before settling into the net and keeping Ann Arbor in the match. Liam Moore won the shootout for Duluth, 4–3, when he scored on their fifth kick, and Duluth celebrated the Midwest Region championship.

Orange County FC and FC Mulhouse Portland played a wild first half in the West Region Final. Both teams held the lead for stretches of a half that ended 3–3. Orange County got goals from Alessandro Canale, Michael Bryant and Dakota Collins. Fred Braun, Christian Thyron and Alex White scored for Portland. Orange County took a 4–3 lead, when Cody Shelton scored in the 53rd minute, but Portland responded in the 60th minute with Braun's second goal of the match. Reed McKenna's goal put Portland in front in the 78th minute. Jonathan Bryan drew a red card for a serious foul play in the 84th minute that forced Orange County to play with 10 men. Luis Galeano's 90th-minute goal put away a 6–4 win for Portland that gave them the West Region championship.

==== National semifinals ====
The NPSL National semifinals were played on July 28. Miami FC 2 got goals from Ariel Martínez (on a penalty kick), Sean McFarlane Jr. and Jeff Michaud to beat Duluth FC, 3–0. Jan Hoffelner had 10 saves for Duluth, before leaving the match in the 88th minute, after suffering an injury. Mario Daniel Vega kept the clean sheet for Miami.

In the other semifinal match, Dilly Duka put FC Motown in front of FC Mulhouse Portland with a goal in the 55th minute. Nick Evans responded for Portland in the 63rd minute to tie the score. David Nigro, who had just entered the match as a substitute in anticipation of a penalty-kick shootout, headed in the game winner on a cross from Lucas Terci in the first minute of extra-time stoppage time to send Motown to the NPSL Final.

==== NPSL Final ====
FC Motown hosted Miami FC 2 in the NPSL Final on August 4, in front of a sellout crowd of 2,143 spectators. Miami struck first on a Jonny Steele goal in the 33rd minute. Dilly Duka answered for Motown two minutes later. Motown was reduced to playing with 10 men in the 58th minute, when Chris Riordan drew his second yellow card. One minute later, Dylan Mares's goal put Miami back into the lead. Jeff Michaud added an insurance goal in the 81st minute, and Miami FC 2 went on to win the NPSL championship in its inaugural season.

== Standings and results ==
=== Northeast Region ===
==== Keystone Conference ====
Pos	Team	Pld	W	L	T	GF	GA	GD	Pts	Qualification
1	FC Motown (C, Q)	10	9	1	0	40	5	+35	27	Keystone Conference playoffs
2	Junior Lone Star FC (Q)	10	8	2	0	26	12	+14	24	Keystone Conference playoffs
3	West Chester United SC (Q)	10	7	3	0	29	9	+20	21	Keystone Conference playoffs
4	FC Monmouth (Q)	10	6	3	1	16	13	+3	19	Keystone Conference playoffs
5	New Jersey Copa FC	10	5	4	1	27	20	+7	16	
6	Atlantic City FC	10	5	5	0	15	9	+6	15	
7	Hershey FC	10	2	7	1	9	25	−16	7	
8	Electric City Shock SC	10	1	8	1	8	35	−27	4	
9	Torch FC	10	0	10	0	8	50	−42	0	

Source: NPSL standings
Rules for classification: 1) points; 2) head to head; 3) goal differential in head-to-head results; 4) wins; 5) total goal differential; 6) fewest losses; 7) coin toss. If three or more teams are tied on points, a mini-table involving only the tied teams is used, and teams are ranked in the mini-table on points. If two teams are tied on points in the mini-table, the two-team rules for classification apply. If three or more teams are tied on points in the mini-table, they are ranked based on 1) wins in conference competition; 2) total goal differential in conference competition; 3) fewest losses in conference competition; 4) coin toss.
(C) Champions; (Q) Qualified for the phase indicated

Home \ Away	MOT	JLS	WCU	MON	NJC	AC	HER	ECS	TOR
FC Motown	—	—	1–2	3–0	—	3–1	6–1	6–0	—
Junior Lone Star FC	0–4	—	1–2	3–1	—	—	2–0	—	7–1
West Chester United SC	—	0–1	—	—	—	1–0	4–0	4–0	7–0
FC Monmouth	—	—	1–0	—	2–2	1–0	2–1	2–1	—
New Jersey Copa FC	0–4	2–4	5–3	1–3	—	0–3	—	—	—
Atlantic City FC	—	0–1	—	2–0	0–1	—	—	3–1	5–1
Hershey FC	1–3	—	—	—	0–3	0–1	—	2–1	3–2
Electric City Shock SC	0–7	1–3	—	—	0–5	—	1–1	—	3–2
Torch FC	0–3	1–4	0–6	0–4	1–8	—	—	—	—

Source: NPSL schedule
Legend: Blue = home team win; Yellow = draw; Red = away team win.

==== Mid-Atlantic Conference ====
Pos	Team	Pld	W	L	T	GF	GA	GD	Pts	Qualification
1	FC Baltimore (Q)	10	7	2	1	37	10	+27	22	Mid-Atlantic Conference Final
2	Northern Virginia United FC (Q)	10	6	3	1	16	13	+3	19	Mid-Atlantic Conference Semifinal
3	FC Frederick (C, Q)	10	4	4	2	26	9	+17	14 (Note: FC Frederick had one road win and one home draw in its two matches against Virginia Beach City FC to win the standings tiebreaker)	Mid-Atlantic Conference Semifinal
4	Virginia Beach City FC	10	4	4	2	22	16	+6	14	
5	Charlottesville Alliance FC	10	3	5	2	9	20	−11	11	
6	Legacy 76	10	2	8	0	6	48	−42	6	

Source: NPSL standings
Rules for classification: 1) points; 2) head to head; 3) goal differential in head-to-head results; 4) wins; 5) total goal differential; 6) fewest losses; 7) coin toss. If three or more teams are tied on points, a mini-table involving only the tied teams is used, and teams are ranked in the mini-table on points. If two teams are tied on points in the mini-table, the two-team rules for classification apply. If three or more teams are tied on points in the mini-table, they are ranked based on 1) wins in conference competition; 2) total goal differential in conference competition; 3) fewest losses in conference competition; 4) coin toss.
(C) Champions; (Q) Qualified for the phase indicated
Notes:

Home \ Away	BAL	NVU	FRE	VBC	CHA	LEG
FC Baltimore	—	1–0	2–0	1–1	8–2	13–0
Northern Virginia United FC	3–0	—	2–1	2–1	1–1	4–0
FC Frederick	0–1	0–1	—	1–1	4–0	7–0
Virginia Beach City FC	2–5	7–1	0–3	—	2–0	3–0
Charlottesville Alliance FC	1–0	2–0	1–1	2–1	—	0–1
Legacy 76	1–6	0–2	1–9	1–4	2–0	—

Source: NPSL schedule
Legend: Blue = home team win; Yellow = draw; Red = away team win.

==== North Atlantic Conference ====
Pos	Team	Pld	W	L	T	GF	GA	GD	Pts	Qualification
1	New York Cosmos B (C, Q)	10	10	0	0	40	8	+32	30	North Atlantic Conference playoffs
2	Brooklyn Italians (Q)	10	7	2	1	29	10	+19	22	North Atlantic Conference playoffs
3	Hartford City FC (Q)	10	6	3	1	21	15	+6	19	North Atlantic Conference playoffs
4	Elm City Express (Q)	10	5	3	2	25	22	+3	17	North Atlantic Conference playoffs
5	Rhode Island Reds F.C.	10	4	4	2	24	26	−2	14 (Note: Rhode Island Reds F.C. won, 4–0, on the road against New York Athletic Club on June 24, in the only meeting of the season between the clubs to win the standings tiebreaker)	
6	New York Athletic Club	10	4	4	2	14	19	−5	14	
7	Greater Lowell NPSL FC	10	4	6	0	20	29	−9	12	
8	Kingston Stockade FC	10	3	5	2	20	22	−2	11	
9	Boston City FC	10	2	5	3	12	25	−13	9	
10	TSF FC	10	1	6	3	12	21	−9	6	
11	Seacoast United Mariners	10	0	8	2	5	25	−20	2	

Source: NPSL standings
Rules for classification: 1) points; 2) head to head; 3) goal differential in head-to-head results; 4) wins; 5) total goal differential; 6) fewest losses; 7) coin toss. If three or more teams are tied on points, a mini-table involving only the tied teams is used, and teams are ranked in the mini-table on points. If two teams are tied on points in the mini-table, the two-team rules for classification apply. If three or more teams are tied on points in the mini-table, they are ranked based on 1) wins in conference competition; 2) total goal differential in conference competition; 3) fewest losses in conference competition; 4) coin toss.
(C) Champions; (Q) Qualified for the phase indicated
Notes:

Home \ Away	NYC	BKN	HAR	ECE	RIR	NYA	GRL	KIN	BOS	TSF	SUM
New York Cosmos B	—	2–1	—	5–0	—	4–1	6–1	4–0	—	—	—
Brooklyn Italians	—	—	0–3	1–1	4–1	3–0	—	1–0	—	—	—
Hartford City FC	1–2	—	—	2–1	2–3	—	—	3–2	—	3–2	—
Elm City Express	—	—	—	—	—	5–1	2–3	—	2–1	2–1	2–0
Rhode Island Reds F.C.	2–4	—	—	4–6	—	—	—	—	2–2	2–1	2–2
New York Athletic Club	—	—	2–2	—	0–4	—	3–0	—	1–0	—	4–0
Greater Lowell NPSL FC	—	1–6	1–3	—	2–4	—	—	5–1	—	2–1	—
Kingston Stockade FC	—	—	—	4–4	3–0	1–2	—	—	5–1	—	2–0
Boston City FC	0–4	0–6	2–0	—	—	—	3–2	—	—	—	1–1
TSF FC	0–5	2–3	—	—	—	0–0	—	2–2	2–2	—	—
Seacoast United Mariners	2–4	0–4	0–2	—	—	—	0–3	—	—	0–1	—

Source: NPSL schedule
Legend: Blue = home team win; Yellow = draw; Red = away team win.

=== South Region ===
==== Southeast Conference ====
Pos	Team	Pld	W	L	T	GF	GA	GD	Pts	Qualification
1	Chattanooga FC (Q)	14	8	2	4	30	16	+14	28	Southeast Conference Semifinal
2	Atlanta Silverbacks FC (C, Q)	14	7	4	3	29	21	+8	24	Southeast Conference Semifinal
3	New Orleans Jesters (Q)	14	7	5	2	26	18	+8	23	Southeast Conference Quarterfinal
4	Inter Nashville FC (Q)	14	6	6	2	29	26	+3	20	Southeast Conference Quarterfinal
5	Asheville City SC (Q)	14	5	6	3	18	22	−4	18 (Note: Both matches between Asheville City SC and Georgia Revolution FC ended in 1–1 ties; Asheville City SC wins the standings tiebreaker on total goal differential)	Southeast Conference Quarterfinal
6	Georgia Revolution FC (Q)	14	5	6	3	23	30	−7	18	Southeast Conference Quarterfinal
7	Greenville FC	14	4	7	3	20	28	−8	15	
8	Emerald Force SC	14	4	10	0	21	35	−14	12	

Source: NPSL standings
Rules for classification: 1) points; 2) head to head; 3) goal differential in head-to-head results; 4) wins; 5) total goal differential; 6) fewest losses; 7) coin toss. If three or more teams are tied on points, a mini-table involving only the tied teams is used, and teams are ranked in the mini-table on points. If two teams are tied on points in the mini-table, the two-team rules for classification apply. If three or more teams are tied on points in the mini-table, they are ranked based on 1) wins in conference competition; 2) total goal differential in conference competition; 3) fewest losses in conference competition; 4) coin toss.
(C) Champions; (Q) Qualified for the phase indicated
Notes:

Home \ Away	CHA	ATL	NOJ	NAS	ASH	GEO	GRE	EMF
Chattanooga FC	—	4–1	2–2	1–0	1–1	2–4	2–1	2–0
Atlanta Silverbacks FC	1–1	—	2–0	2–2	0–1	3–2	1–2	5–3
New Orleans Jesters	3–2	1–2	—	1–1	1–2	3–1	1–2	4–0
Inter Nashville FC	0–2	1–2	0–3	—	5–1	2–3	3–2	5–3
Asheville City SC	1–2	3–1	1–3	2–0	—	1–1	0–1	2–1
Georgia Revolution FC	0–3	0–5	1–2	2–6	1–1	—	3–1	3–0
Greenville FC	1–1	1–1	1–2	1–2	3–2	1–1	—	2–5
Emerald Force SC	1–5	0–3	1–0	1–2	2–0	0–1	4–1	—

Source: NPSL schedule
Legend: Blue = home team win; Yellow = draw; Red = away team win.

==== Sunshine Conference ====
Pos	Team	Pld	W	L	T	GF	GA	GD	Pts	Qualification
1	Miami FC 2 (C, Q)	12	8	1	3	30	5	+25	27	Sunshine Conference Final
2	Jacksonville Armada FC (Q)	12	7	2	3	24	10	+14	24	Sunshine Conference Semifinal
3	Miami United FC (Q)	12	6	1	5	27	7	+20	23	Sunshine Conference Semifinal
4	Palm Beach United	12	6	6	0	26	21	+5	18	
5	Naples United FC	12	5	6	1	16	15	+1	16	
6	Boca Raton FC	12	3	8	1	12	37	−25	10	
7	Storm FC	12	0	11	1	1	41	−40	1	

Source: NPSL standings
Rules for classification: 1) points; 2) head to head; 3) goal differential in head-to-head results; 4) wins; 5) total goal differential; 6) fewest losses; 7) coin toss. If three or more teams are tied on points, a mini-table involving only the tied teams is used, and teams are ranked in the mini-table on points. If two teams are tied on points in the mini-table, the two-team rules for classification apply. If three or more teams are tied on points in the mini-table, they are ranked based on 1) wins in conference competition; 2) total goal differential in conference competition; 3) fewest losses in conference competition; 4) coin toss.
(C) Champions; (Q) Qualified for the phase indicated

Home \ Away	MI2	JAX	MIU	PBU	NAP	BR	STO
Miami FC 2	—	1–1	1–1	4–1	2–0	5–0	2–0
Jacksonville Armada FC	1–0	—	0–0	3–2	2–0	7–0	1–0
Miami United FC	1–1	1–1	—	1–2	3–0	1–1	3–0
Palm Beach United	0–1	4–2	1–2	—	0–2	4–1	5–0
Naples United FC	0–1	1–0	0–1	4–2	—	5–0	2–0
Boca Raton FC	0–5	1–2	0–4	1–3	3–1	—	1–0
Storm FC	0–7	0–4	0–9	0–2	1–1	0–4	—

Source: NPSL schedule
Legend: Blue = home team win; Yellow = draw; Red = away team win.

==== Lone Star Conference ====
Pos	Grp	Team	Pld	W	L	T	GF	GA	GD	Pts	Qualification
1	White	Laredo Heat (C, Q)	10	10	0	0	37	4	+33	30	Lone Star Conference Semifinal
2	Red	Midland-Odessa Sockers FC (Q)	10	7	2	1	30	8	+22	22	Lone Star Conference Semifinal
3	Blue	Houston Dutch Lions FC (Q)	10	7	3	0	40	11	+29	21	Lone Star Conference Quarterfinal
4	Red	Fort Worth Vaqueros FC (Q)	10	6	2	2	26	17	+9	20	Lone Star Conference Quarterfinal
5	White	FC Brownsville (Q)	10	4	6	0	18	23	−5	12	Lone Star Conference Quarterfinal
6	Blue	Shreveport Rafters FC (Q)	10	3	5	2	18	22	−4	11	Lone Star Conference Quarterfinal
7	Blue	Katy 1895 FC	10	3	7	0	21	34	−13	9	
8	White	Houston Regals SCA	10	2	7	1	15	39	−24	7	
9	Red	Tyler FC	10	0	10	0	7	54	−47	0	

Source: NPSL standings
Rules for classification: 1) points; 2) head to head; 3) goal differential in head-to-head results; 4) wins; 5) total goal differential; 6) fewest losses; 7) coin toss. If three or more teams are tied on points, a mini-table involving only the tied teams is used, and teams are ranked in the mini-table on points. If two teams are tied on points in the mini-table, the two-team rules for classification apply. If three or more teams are tied on points in the mini-table, they are ranked based on 1) wins in conference competition; 2) total goal differential in conference competition; 3) fewest losses in conference competition; 4) coin toss.
(C) Champions; (Q) Qualified for the phase indicated

Home \ Away	LAR	MO	HDL	FWV	BRO	SHR	KAT	HOR	TYL
Laredo Heat	—	—	2–0	1–0	4–1	—	6–0	7–0	—
Midland-Odessa Sockers FC	1–3	—	1–0	2–2	—	—	—	6–0	4–0
Houston Dutch Lions FC	—	—	—	6–2	—	4–2	0–1	3–0	8–0
Fort Worth Vaqueros FC	—	3–2	—	—	2–1	1–1	5–2	—	6–1
FC Brownsville	0–3	0–1	1–6	—	—	—	4–1	5–2	—
Shreveport Rafters FC	1–4	0–1	2–4	—	1–2	—	3–1	—	—
Katy 1895 FC	—	0–3	0–9	—	—	1–3	—	9–1	6–0
Houston Regals SCA	0–1	—	—	0–2	3–0	3–3	—	—	6–3
Tyler FC	1–6	0–9	—	1–3	0–4	1–2	—	—	—

Source: NPSL schedule
Legend: Blue = home team win; Yellow = draw; Red = away team win.

==== Heartland Conference ====
Pos	Team	Pld	W	L	T	GF	GA	GD	Pts	Qualification
1	FC Wichita (Q)	10	7	2	1	24	11	+13	22	Heartland Conference playoffs
2	Little Rock Rangers (C, Q)	10	7	3	0	18	16	+2	21	Heartland Conference playoffs
3	Tulsa Athletic (Q)	10	6	4	0	26	17	+9	18	Heartland Conference playoffs
4	Saint Louis Club Atletico (Q)	10	5	4	1	19	19	0	16	Heartland Conference playoffs
5	Demize NPSL	10	3	6	1	14	20	−6	10	
6	Ozark FC	10	0	9	1	4	22	−18	1	

Source: NPSL standings
Rules for classification: 1) points; 2) head to head; 3) goal differential in head-to-head results; 4) wins; 5) total goal differential; 6) fewest losses; 7) coin toss. If three or more teams are tied on points, a mini-table involving only the tied teams is used, and teams are ranked in the mini-table on points. If two teams are tied on points in the mini-table, the two-team rules for classification apply. If three or more teams are tied on points in the mini-table, they are ranked based on 1) wins in conference competition; 2) total goal differential in conference competition; 3) fewest losses in conference competition; 4) coin toss.
(C) Champions; (Q) Qualified for the phase indicated

Home \ Away	WIC	LRR	TUL	STL	DEM	OZA
FC Wichita	—	2–1	3–1	4–2	1–1	5–0
Little Rock Rangers	1–0	—	2–0	2–3	1–0	2–1
Tulsa Athletic	3–5	6–1	—	2–1	6–0	3–0
Saint Louis Club Atletico	2–1	1–3	4–2	—	0–3	1–1
Demize NPSL	0–2	3–4	1–2	0–3	—	2–0
Ozark FC	0–1	0–1	0–1	1–2	1–4	—

Source: NPSL schedule
Legend: Blue = home team win; Yellow = draw; Red = away team win.

=== Midwest Region ===
==== East Conference ====
Pos	Team	Pld	W	L	T	GF	GA	GD	Pts	Qualification
1	Erie Commodores FC (C, Q)	12	8	1	3	36	13	+23	27	Midwest Region Quarterfinal
2	Cleveland SC (Q)	12	7	2	3	34	11	+23	24	Midwest Region Quarterfinal
3	Rochester Lancers	12	6	3	3	22	18	+4	21	
4	FC Buffalo	12	6	4	2	27	21	+6	20	
5	Fort Pitt Regiment	12	6	5	1	23	14	+9	19	
6	Syracuse FC	12	3	9	0	16	24	−8	9	
7	Greater Binghamton FC Thunder	12	0	12	0	9	66	−57	0	

Source: NPSL standings
Rules for classification: 1) points; 2) head to head; 3) goal differential in head-to-head results; 4) wins; 5) total goal differential; 6) fewest losses; 7) coin toss. If three or more teams are tied on points, a mini-table involving only the tied teams is used, and teams are ranked in the mini-table on points. If two teams are tied on points in the mini-table, the two-team rules for classification apply. If three or more teams are tied on points in the mini-table, they are ranked based on 1) wins in conference competition; 2) total goal differential in conference competition; 3) fewest losses in conference competition; 4) coin toss.
(C) Champions; (Q) Qualified for the phase indicated

Home \ Away	ERI	CLE	ROC	BUF	FPR	SYR	GBT
Erie Commodores FC	—	2–1	1–1	4–3	3–1	2–1	4–1
Cleveland SC	3–2	—	2–0	3–3	1–3	4–0	10–0
Rochester Lancers	2–2	1–1	—	2–4	1–0	4–0	5–3
FC Buffalo	0–4	0–0	3–0	—	0–2	4–1	2–1
Fort Pitt Regiment	0–0	0–3	0–2	3–1	—	3–1	6–0
Syracuse FC	0–1	0–1	1–2	0–2	1–0	—	4–0
Greater Binghamton FC Thunder	0–11	0–5	1–2	1–5	1–5	1–7	—

Source: NPSL schedule
Legend: Blue = home team win; Yellow = draw; Red = away team win.

==== Great Lakes Conference ====
Pos	Team	Pld	W	L	T	GF	GA	GD	Pts	Qualification
1	AFC Ann Arbor (C, Q)	12	9	1	2	31	4	+27	29	Midwest Region Semifinal
2	Grand Rapids FC (Q)	12	7	3	2	29	14	+15	23	Midwest Region Quarterfinal
3	FC Columbus	12	6	4	2	27	11	+16	20	
4	Detroit City FC	12	5	4	3	36	15	+21	18	
5	Kalamazoo FC	12	4	5	3	22	25	−3	15	
6	Milwaukee Torrent	12	3	5	4	17	22	−5	13	
7	FC Indiana	12	0	12	0	4	75	−71	0	

Source: NPSL standings
Rules for classification: 1) points; 2) head to head; 3) goal differential in head-to-head results; 4) wins; 5) total goal differential; 6) fewest losses; 7) coin toss. If three or more teams are tied on points, a mini-table involving only the tied teams is used, and teams are ranked in the mini-table on points. If two teams are tied on points in the mini-table, the two-team rules for classification apply. If three or more teams are tied on points in the mini-table, they are ranked based on 1) wins in conference competition; 2) total goal differential in conference competition; 3) fewest losses in conference competition; 4) coin toss.
(C) Champions; (Q) Qualified for the phase indicated

Home \ Away	AA	GR	COL	DET	KAL	MIL	IND
AFC Ann Arbor	—	2–0	1–0	1–0	4–0	1–1	9–0
Grand Rapids FC	2–0	—	0–3	4–4	5–0	2–1	6–0
FC Columbus	1–2	2–1	—	1–1	3–1	2–2	9–0
Detroit City FC	0–1	0–2	1–0	—	1–1	6–1	8–0
Kalamazoo FC	0–0	2–3	0–2	4–3	—	2–2	5–0
Milwaukee Torrent	0–4	0–0	1–0	0–1	1–2	—	5–0
FC Indiana	0–6	0–4	1–4	0–11	1–5	2–3	—

Source: NPSL schedule
Legend: Blue = home team win; Yellow = draw; Red = away team win.

==== North Conference ====
Pos	Team	Pld	W	L	T	GF	GA	GD	Pts	Qualification
1	Minneapolis City SC (C, Q)	14	10	0	4	46	14	+32	34	Midwest Region Semifinal
2	Duluth FC (Q)	14	8	2	4	31	15	+16	28	Midwest Region Quarterfinal
3	Viejos Son Los Trapos FC	14	7	5	2	28	16	+12	23	
4	Med City FC	14	6	4	4	30	12	+18	22	
5	Minnesota TwinStars FC	14	6	5	3	32	25	+7	21	
6	Dakota Fusion FC	14	4	7	3	22	48	−26	15	
7	Sioux Falls Thunder FC	14	4	9	1	25	34	−9	13	
8	La Crosse Aris FC	14	0	13	1	10	60	−50	1	

Source: NPSL standings
Rules for classification: 1) points; 2) head to head; 3) goal differential in head-to-head results; 4) wins; 5) total goal differential; 6) fewest losses; 7) coin toss. If three or more teams are tied on points, a mini-table involving only the tied teams is used, and teams are ranked in the mini-table on points. If two teams are tied on points in the mini-table, the two-team rules for classification apply. If three or more teams are tied on points in the mini-table, they are ranked based on 1) wins in conference competition; 2) total goal differential in conference competition; 3) fewest losses in conference competition; 4) coin toss.
(C) Champions; (Q) Qualified for the phase indicated

Home \ Away	MNC	DUL	VST	MED	MNT	DAK	SFT	LCA
Minneapolis City SC	—	4–2	2–1	3–2	2–2	5–0	6–1	5–1
Duluth FC	1–1	—	0–1	1–0	3–2	1–0	4–0	4–0
Viejos Son Los Trapos FC	1–5	0–1	—	1–0	1–2	5–0	1–0	5–0
Med City FC	1–2	0–0	0–0	—	1–1	11–0	3–1	5–1
Minnesota TwinStars FC	0–1	3–3	0–1	1–3	—	4–1	2–0	3–0
Dakota Fusion FC	0–8	2–2	2–2	0–0	4–3	—	3–2	5–0
Sioux Falls Thunder FC	2–2	1–2	3–2	0–2	2–3	5–2	—	6–1
La Crosse Aris FC	0–0	1–7	1–7	1–2	3–6	0–3	1–2	—

Source: NPSL schedule
Legend: Blue = home team win; Yellow = draw; Red = away team win.

=== West Region ===
==== Golden Gate Conference ====
Pos	Team	Pld	W	L	T	GF	GA	GD	Pts	Qualification
1	El Farolito (C, Q)	14	9	0	5	33	13	+20	32	West Region playoffs
2	CD Aguiluchos USA (Q)	14	8	3	3	23	16	+7	27	West Region playoffs
3	Sonoma County Sol (Q)	14	7	4	3	39	25	+14	24	West Region playoffs
4	East Bay FC Stompers	14	5	6	3	24	24	0	18	
5	Academica SC	14	4	6	4	30	27	+3	16	
6	FC Davis	14	3	6	5	18	29	−11	14	
7	Napa Valley 1839 FC	14	4	9	1	19	36	−17	13	
8	Sacramento Gold	14	2	8	4	16	32	−16	10	

Source: NPSL standings
Rules for classification: 1) points; 2) head to head; 3) goal differential in head-to-head results; 4) wins; 5) total goal differential; 6) fewest losses; 7) coin toss. If three or more teams are tied on points, a mini-table involving only the tied teams is used, and teams are ranked in the mini-table on points. If two teams are tied on points in the mini-table, the two-team rules for classification apply. If three or more teams are tied on points in the mini-table, they are ranked based on 1) wins in conference competition; 2) total goal differential in conference competition; 3) fewest losses in conference competition; 4) coin toss.
(C) Champions; (Q) Qualified for the phase indicated

Home \ Away	EFA	AGU	SCS	EBS	ACA	DAV	NV	SAC
El Farolito	—	2–2	4–2	2–1	0–0	1–1	6–0	3–0
CD Aguiluchos USA	1–1	—	3–0	2–1	1–0	1–0	4–1	3–1
Sonoma County Sol	2–4	3–0	—	2–1	4–4	1–1	2–1	9–0
East Bay FC Stompers	1–1	2–1	2–2	—	1–2	0–3	6–1	2–1
Academica SC	0–2	1–2	4–2	4–0	—	7–1	1–3	4–5
FC Davis	1–3	3–0	0–2	1–1	3–3	—	2–0	1–6
Napa Valley 1839 FC	2–3	1–3	0–4	2–4	3–0	3–0	—	1–0
Sacramento Gold	0–1	0–0	1–4	0–2	0–0	1–1	1–1	—

Source: NPSL schedule
Legend: Blue = home team win; Yellow = draw; Red = away team win.

==== Northwest Conference ====
Pos	Team	Pld	W	L	T	GF	GA	GD	Pts	Qualification
1	Spokane SC Shadow (C, Q)	12	7	0	5	33	12	+21	26	West Region playoffs
2	FC Mulhouse Portland (Q)	12	6	2	4	23	14	+9	22	West Region playoffs
3	Kitsap Pumas	12	4	5	3	15	19	−4	15	
4	OSA FC	12	3	7	2	23	33	−10	11	
5	PDX FC	12	2	8	2	12	28	−16	8	

Source: NPSL standings
Rules for classification: 1) points; 2) head to head; 3) goal differential in head-to-head results; 4) wins; 5) total goal differential; 6) fewest losses; 7) coin toss. If three or more teams are tied on points, a mini-table involving only the tied teams is used, and teams are ranked in the mini-table on points. If two teams are tied on points in the mini-table, the two-team rules for classification apply. If three or more teams are tied on points in the mini-table, they are ranked based on 1) wins in conference competition; 2) total goal differential in conference competition; 3) fewest losses in conference competition; 4) coin toss.
(C) Champions; (Q) Qualified for the phase indicated

Rounds 1 and 2 results

Home \ Away	SPO	MPO	KIT	OSA	PDX
Spokane SC Shadow	—	1–1	5–0	3–0	4–1
FC Mulhouse Portland	2–2	—	4–1	5–1	1–1
Kitsap Pumas	2–2	0–1	—	2–2	2–0
OSA FC	4–4	3–2	1–2	—	7–2
PDX FC	0–1	0–0	0–2	4–0	—

Source: NPSL schedule
Legend: Blue = home team win; Yellow = draw; Red = away team win.

Round 3 results

Home \ Away	SPO	MPO	KIT	OSA	PDX
Spokane SC Shadow	—	2–0	—	—	6–0
FC Mulhouse Portland	—	—	—	3–1	2–1
Kitsap Pumas	1–1	1–2	—	—	—
OSA FC	1–2	—	0–2	—	—
PDX FC	—	—	1–0	2–3	—

Source: NPSL schedule
Legend: Blue = home team win; Yellow = draw; Red = away team win.

==== Southwest Conference ====
Pos	Team	Pld	W	L	T	GF	GA	GD	Pts	Qualification
1	ASC San Diego (C, Q)	12	9	2	1	31	15	+16	28	West Region playoffs
2	FC Golden State (Q)	12	8	2	2	27	15	+12	26	West Region playoffs
3	Orange County FC (Q)	12	7	1	4	26	14	+12	25	Southwest Conference Play-in Game
4	FC Arizona (Q)	12	5	5	2	20	13	+7	17	Southwest Conference Play-in Game
5	Riverside Coras USA	12	2	7	3	18	29	−11	9	
6	Oxnard Guerreros FC	12	2	9	1	14	30	−16	7	
7	Temecula FC	12	1	8	3	12	32	−20	6	

Source: NPSL standings
Rules for classification: 1) points; 2) head to head; 3) goal differential in head-to-head results; 4) wins; 5) total goal differential; 6) fewest losses; 7) coin toss. If three or more teams are tied on points, a mini-table involving only the tied teams is used, and teams are ranked in the mini-table on points. If two teams are tied on points in the mini-table, the two-team rules for classification apply. If three or more teams are tied on points in the mini-table, they are ranked based on 1) wins in conference competition; 2) total goal differential in conference competition; 3) fewest losses in conference competition; 4) coin toss.
(C) Champions; (Q) Qualified for the phase indicated

Home \ Away	SD	GS	OC	ARZ	RIV	OXG	TEM
ASC San Diego	—	5–1	1–3	3–3	2–0	2–1	4–0
FC Golden State	2–3	—	0–0	1–0	3–1	5–0	2–2
Orange County FC	2–1	1–2	—	1–0	4–3	5–0	3–1
FC Arizona	2–3	1–3	0–0	—	1–0	0–1	6–0
Riverside Coras USA	1–3	0–2	3–3	0–4	—	2–1	1–1
Oxnard Guerreros FC	0–2	2–3	2–3	0–1	3–3	—	4–0
Temecula FC	0–2	0–3	1–1	1–2	2–4	4–0	—

Source: NPSL schedule
Legend: Blue = home team win; Yellow = draw; Red = away team win.

== Playoff format ==
Source: 2018 NPSL Playoff Structure
In the Northeast and South Regions, conference champions are determined by postseason playoff tournaments. In the Midwest and West Regions, conference champions are determined by regular-season standings. The playoff qualification and format rules vary among regions and conferences. Once teams reach the regional playoffs, either by their performance in their conference tournament, their regular-season results or, in the case of the Northeast Region wildcard team, a combination of the two, all matches are knockout matches. The four regional champions advance to the national semifinals and are seeded based on regular-season average points per game. Regular-season average goal difference per game is the first tiebreaker used to determine seeding, if needed. Regular-season average goals scored per game is the second tiebreaker. If the tie is still not broken, a coin toss determines seeding. The #1 seed plays the #4 seed in one national semifinal, and the #2 seed plays the #3 seed in the other national semifinal on July 28. Semifinal winners advance to the NPSL Championship Match on August 4. Home-field advantage in national semifinal and final matches is awarded to the highest seed.

=== Northeast Region Playoffs ===
Four teams qualify for the Northeast Region Semifinals. These are the three winners of the conference championship playoffs and the conference finals loser with the best regular-season average points per game. The four semifinalists are seeded based on regular-season points per game. The three conference champions are not automatically awarded the highest seed; the wildcard team could be the top seed. The #1 seed plays the #4 seed in one regional semifinal. The #2 seed plays the #3 seed in the other regional semifinal. Semifinal winners advance to the Northeast Region Championship Match. Home-field advantage in a regional playoff match is awarded to the highest seed.

==== Keystone Conference Playoffs ====
The top four teams qualify based on conference standings. The #1 seed plays the #4 seed in one conference semifinal. The #2 seed plays the #3 seed in the other conference semifinal. Semifinal winners meet in the Keystone Conference Championship Match. Home-field advantage in conference playoff matches is awarded to the highest seed.

==== Mid-Atlantic Conference Playoffs ====
The top three teams qualify based on conference standings. The #2 seed plays the #3 seed in a semifinal match, and the winner plays the #1 seed in the Mid-Atlantic Conference Championship Match. Home-field advantage in conference playoff matches is awarded to the highest seed.

==== North Atlantic Conference Playoffs ====
The top four teams qualify based on conference standings. The #1 seed plays the #4 seed in one conference semifinal. The #2 seed plays the #3 seed in the other conference semifinal. Semifinal winners meet in the North Atlantic Conference Championship Match. Home-field advantage in conference playoff matches is awarded to the highest seed.

=== South Region Playoffs ===
The four conference playoff champions qualify for the South Region Semifinals. Teams are seeded based on regular-season average points per game for hosting purposes, but the semifinal matchups are fixed with the Heartland and Lone Star Conference champions meeting in one semifinal, and the Southeast and Sunshine Conference champions matched up in the other semifinal. Semifinal winners advance to the South Region Championship Match.

==== Southeast Conference Playoffs ====
The top six teams qualify based on conference standings. The top two teams receive byes to the conference semifinals. The #3 seed plays the #6 seed, and the #4 seed plays the #5 seed in conference quarterfinal matches. The #1 seed plays lowest seeded quarterfinal winner in one semifinal match; the #2 seed plays higher seeded quarterfinal winner in the other semifinal match. Semifinal winners meet in the Southeast Conference Championship Match. Home-field advantage in conference playoff matches is awarded to the highest seed.

==== Sunshine Conference Playoffs ====
The top three teams qualify based on conference standings. The #2 seed plays the #3 seed in a semifinal match, and the winner plays the #1 seed in the Sunshine Conference Championship Match. Home-field advantage in conference playoff matches is awarded to the highest seed.

==== Lone Star Conference Playoffs ====
The conference is split into three groups: Red, White and Blue. The top two teams from each group receive playoff berths. The three teams that finish first in their groups are awarded the top three seeds based on conference standings. The three teams that finish second in their groups are awarded the fourth through sixth seeds based on conference standings. The top two seeds receive byes to the conference semifinals. The #3 seed plays the #6 seed, and the #4 seed plays the #5 seed in conference quarterfinal matches. The #1 seed plays the lowest seeded quarterfinal winner in one semifinal match; the #2 seed plays higher seeded quarterfinal winner in the other semifinal match. Semifinal winners meet in the Lone Star Conference Championship Match. Home-field advantage in conference playoff matches is awarded to the highest seed.

==== Heartland Conference Playoffs ====
The top four teams qualify based on conference standings. The #1 seed plays the #4 seed in one conference semifinal. The #2 seed plays the #3 seed in the other conference semifinal. Semifinal winners meet in the Heartland Conference Championship Match. Home-field advantage in conference playoff matches is awarded to the highest seed.

=== Midwest Region Playoffs ===
Conference champions are determined based on the regular-season conference standings. The top two teams from each conference qualify for the region playoffs based on conference standings. The three conference champions are awarded the top three seeds. The three teams that finish second in their conferences are awarded the fourth through sixth seeds. The top two seeds receive byes to the region semifinals. The #3 seed hosts a region quarterfinal match against the team seeded 4 through 6 that is geographically closest to it. The remaining two lower seeds play each other with the higher seed hosting. The #1 seed plays the lowest seeded quarterfinal winner in one semifinal match; the #2 seed plays higher seeded quarterfinal winner in the other semifinal match. Semifinal winners meet in the Midwest Region Championship Match. The semifinals and final are held at one venue voted upon by Midwest Region club owners; designation of home teams is determined by the highest seed in each match. Riverbank Stadium at Huron High School in Ann Arbor, Michigan was selected as the host venue.

=== West Region Playoffs ===
Conference champions are determined based on the regular-season conference standings. Eight teams qualify for the region playoffs based on conference standings and one conference playoff match: two from the Northwest Conference, three from the Golden Gate Conference and three from the Southwest Conference. The third team from the Southwest Conference is determined by a play-in game between the third and fourth-place finishers in the conference standings, hosted by third place team. The region quarterfinals are fixed pairings with the top seeds from each conference hosting lower seeds from their own conference and one interconference match as follows:

- #1 Golden Gate Conference vs. #3 Golden Gate Conference
- #1 Southwest Conference vs. #3 Southwest Conference (winner of play-in game)
- #2 Golden Gate Conference vs. #2 Southwest Conference
  - Match hosted by the team with higher regular-season average points per game
- #1 Northwest Conference vs. #2 Northwest Conference

Following the region quarterfinals, the teams are reseeded 1 through 4. The #1 seed plays the #4 seed in one regional semifinal. The #2 seed plays the #3 seed in the other regional semifinal. Semifinal winners advance to the West Region Championship Match. Home-field advantage in regional playoff matches is awarded to the highest seed.

== Playoff results ==
=== Northeast Region conference playoffs results ===
==== Keystone Conference Playoffs results ====
Conference Semifinals; July 11
**1**	**FC Motown**	**4**
4	FC Monmouth	1
2	Junior Lone Star FC	2 (3)
**3**	**West Chester United SC**	**2*****(4)**

Conference Final; July 14
**1**	**FC Motown**	**1*****(4)**
3	West Chester United SC	1 (3)

Bold = winner
* = after extra time, ( ) = penalty shootout score All times Eastern Daylight Time (UTC-4)

Keystone Conference Playoffs
July 11, 2018
19:00
Semifinals

FC Motown	4–1	FC Monmouth
Calderon 6'; Riordan 26'; Katona 39', 48'; Garcia (yellow card) 43'; James (yellow card) 59'	Report	Vicente (yellow card) 23'; Covello 44'

Ranger Stadium, Madison, New Jersey
July 11, 2018
19:00
Semifinals

Junior Lone Star FC	2–2 (a.e.t.)	West Chester United SC
Allison 37', 48' (yellow card) 118'; Y. Fane (yellow card) 31'; A. Fane (yellow card) 82'; Joe (red card) 85'; Kamara (yellow card) 108'	Report	Wilson 12'; 41' (o.g.); Farrelly (yellow card) 47'; Osborne (yellow card) 78'
Penalties
	3–4

South Philadelphia Super Site, Philadelphia, Pennsylvania

July 14, 2018
19:00
Final

FC Motown	1–1 (a.e.t.)	West Chester United SC
Lurie (yellow card) 14'; Cordeiro (yellow card) 76'; James (yellow card) 79'; Terci 90'	Report	Wilson 28' (yellow card) 45'; Brown (yellow card) 56'; R. Williams (yellow card) 80'; Gonzalez (yellow card) 88'; Martyn (yellow card) 90+4'
Penalties
James (penalty scored); Terci (penalty scored); Lawrence (penalty scored); Nasr (penalty scored)	4–3	(penalty missed) Sales

Ranger Stadium, Madison, New Jersey

==== Mid-Atlantic Conference Playoffs results ====
Conference Semifinal; July 12			Conference Final; July 14
			1	FC Baltimore	1
2	Northern Virginia United FC	2 (3)	**3**	**FC Frederick**	**2**
**3**	**FC Frederick**	**2*****(4)**

Bold = winner
* = after extra time, ( ) = penalty shootout score All times Eastern Daylight Time (UTC-4)

Mid-Atlantic Conference Playoffs
July 12, 2018
19:00
Semifinal

Northern Virginia United FC	2–2 (a.e.t.)	FC Frederick
Verfurth 63'; C. Welsh 97' (pen.) (yellow card) 101'	Report	Toure 60'; Wilkinson (yellow card) 62'; Morris (yellow card) 70'; W. Eskay (yellow card) 91'; Flatter 100'
Penalties
C. Welsh (penalty scored); Buono (penalty missed); Bangura (penalty scored); Jean-Gilles (penalty missed); Ballo (penalty scored)	3–4	(penalty scored) Morales; (penalty scored) Guidry; (penalty missed) Baker; (penalty scored) Flatter; (penalty scored) Hassane

Cropp Metcalfe Park, Leesburg, Virginia
Attendance: 300

July 14, 2018
19:00
Final

FC Baltimore	1–2	FC Frederick
Fawole 18'; Jouan (yellow card) 24'	Report	J. Lee 26'; Guidry 47'; Hassane (yellow card) 56'; Jo. Eskay (yellow card) 76'; Tonon (yellow card) 83'; Toure (yellow card) 84'; Baker (red card) 86'

Community College of Baltimore County Essex, Essex, Maryland

==== North Atlantic Conference Playoffs results ====
Conference Semifinals; July 11
**1**	**New York Cosmos B**	**4***
4	Elm City Express	2
**2**	**Brooklyn Italians**	**3**
3	Hartford City FC	0

Conference Final; July 14
**1**	**New York Cosmos B**	**1*****(5)**
2	Brooklyn Italians	1 (3)

Bold = winner
* = after extra time, ( ) = penalty shootout score All times Eastern Daylight Time (UTC-4)

North Atlantic Conference Playoffs
July 11, 2018
19:30
Semifinals

New York Cosmos B	4–2 (a.e.t.)	Elm City Express
Bardic 29', 40'; Garcia (yellow card) 71'; Wojcik 111'; Bartley 112'	Report	Carlos 14', 45'; Turner (yellow card) 73'; C. Carneiro (yellow card) 77'; Saunchez (yellow card) 118'

Hofstra University Soccer Stadium, Hempstead, New York
July 11, 2018
19:30
Semifinals

Brooklyn Italians	3–0	Hartford City FC
Thristino 11', 60', 65'; Cella (yellow card) 87'	Report	Platkiewicz (yellow card) 89'

Long Island University Field, Brooklyn, New York, New York

July 14, 2018
19:30
Final

New York Cosmos B	1–1 (a.e.t.)	Brooklyn Italians
Garcia (yellow card) 32' (red card) 77'; Szetela (yellow card) 53'; Tenjo (yellow card) 61'; Bartley 75' (yellow card) 84'	Report	Thristino 67' (yellow card) 61'; Bourret (yellow card) 65'; Olafsen (yellow card) 77'; Argeri (yellow card) 95'
Penalties
Velela (penalty scored); Neeskens (penalty scored); Bartley (penalty scored); Espinal (penalty scored); Borrajo (penalty scored)	5–3	(penalty scored) Olafsen; (penalty scored) Cella; (penalty scored) Bourret; (penalty missed) Suchecki

Rocco B. Commisso Soccer Stadium, Manhattan, New York, New York

=== South Region conference playoffs results ===
==== Southeast Conference Playoffs results ====
Conference Quarterfinals; July 10
3	New Orleans Jesters	2
**6**	**Georgia Revolution FC**	**3**
4	Inter Nashville FC	1
**5**	**Asheville City SC**	**3**

Conference Semifinals; July 12
**1**	**Chattanooga FC**	**2**
6	Georgia Revolution FC	0
**2**	**Atlanta Silverbacks FC**	**2**
5	Asheville City SC	0

Conference Final; July 14
1	Chattanooga FC	0 (5)
**2**	**Atlanta Silverbacks FC**	**0*****(6)**

Bold = winner
* = after extra time, ( ) = penalty shootout score

Southeast Conference Playoffs
July 10, 2018
19:00 CDT (UTC-5)
Quarterfinals

New Orleans Jesters	2–3	Georgia Revolution FC
Roberts 64', 80'; Walsh (yellow card) 77'	Report	Henry 15'; Promise 63'; Oakley 78'; King (yellow card) 90'

Pan American Stadium, New Orleans, Louisiana
July 10, 2018
19:30 CDT (UTC-5)
Quarterfinals

Inter Nashville FC	1–3	Asheville City SC
Sauln (yellow card) 26'; Remond 90'; Down (yellow card) 90'	Report	Jamehdar 4'; Nfor 26'; Hichman 75'; Joyner (yellow card) 80'

International Indoor Soccer Complex, Antioch, Nashville, Tennessee

July 12, 2018
19:30 EDT (UTC-4)
Semifinals

Chattanooga FC	2–0	Georgia Revolution FC
Hernandez-Mendizabal 73'; Costa 89'	Report	Lima (yellow card) 72'

W. Max Finley Stadium, Chattanooga, Tennessee
July 12, 2018
19:30 EDT (UTC-4)
Semifinals

Atlanta Silverbacks FC	2–0	Asheville City SC
Moreno-Yeste (yellow card) 54'; Walker 68' (pen.); Jabang 70'; Sissoko (yellow card) 80'; Kamara (yellow card) 83'	Report	Joyner (yellow card) 35'; Gourlay (yellow card) 45'; Matthews (yellow card) 71'

Blessed Trinity Catholic High School, Roswell, Georgia

July 14, 2018
19:30 EDT (UTC-4)
Final

Chattanooga FC	0–0 (a.e.t.)	Atlanta Silverbacks FC
Clarke (yellow card) 29'; Valenciano (yellow card) 110'; D'Amico (yellow card) 120'	Report	Oliveira (yellow card) 56'; Bangura (yellow card) 81'; Marcano (yellow card) 95'; Moreno-Yeste (yellow card) 102'
Penalties
Ferraz (penalty scored); Valenciano (penalty scored); Bocquet (penalty scored); Oliveira (penalty scored); Costa (penalty scored); Woodfin (penalty missed)	5–6	(penalty scored) Jabang; (penalty scored) Walker; (penalty scored) Koloko; (penalty scored) Njie Dampha; (penalty scored) Moreno-Yeste; (penalty scored) Issahaku

W. Max Finley Stadium, Chattanooga, Tennessee
Attendance: 5,169

==== Sunshine Conference Playoffs results ====
Conference Semifinal; July 11			Conference Final; July 14
			**1**	**Miami FC 2**	**3**
**2**	**Jacksonville Armada FC**	**4**	2	Jacksonville Armada FC	1
3	Miami United FC	1

Bold = winner
* = after extra time, ( ) = penalty shootout score All times Eastern Daylight Time (UTC-4)

Sunshine Conference Playoffs
July 11, 2018
19:00
Semifinal

Jacksonville Armada FC	4–1	Miami United FC
Banks 8', 47'; Yuma (yellow card) 30'; Kilduff 49', 74'; Doyle (yellow card) 56'; Charpie (yellow card) 86'	Report	Tejera (yellow card) 15'; Occénat (yellow card) 21'; Micoli 26'; Dominguez (yellow card) 52'; Shenfeld (yellow card) 63'

Hodges Stadium, Jacksonville, Florida
Attendance: 2,044

July 14, 2018
19:00
Final

Miami FC 2	3–1	Jacksonville Armada FC
Tyrpak 8', 53'; Suárez 34'	Report	Kilduff 29'

Saint Thomas University Soccer Field, Miami Gardens, Florida

==== Lone Star Conference Playoffs results ====
Conference Quarterfinals; July 7
**4**	**Fort Worth Vaqueros FC**	**5**
5	FC Brownsville	0
**3**	**Houston Dutch Lions FC**	**3***
6	Shreveport Rafters FC	0

Conference Semifinals; July 11
**1**	**Laredo Heat**	**3**
4	Fort Worth Vaqueros FC	1
2	Midland-Odessa Sockers FC	2
**3**	**Houston Dutch Lions FC**	**3**

Conference Final; July 14
**1**	**Laredo Heat**	**4**
3	Houston Dutch Lions FC	3

Bold = winner
* = after extra time, ( ) = penalty shootout score All times Central Daylight Time (UTC−5)

Lone Star Conference Playoffs
July 7, 2018
19:00
Quarterfinals

Houston Dutch Lions FC	3–0 (a.e.t.)	Shreveport Rafters FC
Beaulaurier (yellow card) 74'; Powell 93'; López 105'; Pettas (yellow card) 107'; Armstrong 115'	Report	Peters (yellow card) 89'; Aviles (yellow card) 105'

Houston Dutch Lions FC Soccer Facility, Conroe, Texas
July 7, 2018
19:30
Quarterfinals

Fort Worth Vaqueros FC	5–0	FC Brownsville
Lovegrove 4', 36'; Soné 28', 86'; Ramirez (yellow card) 45'; Miralrio 60'; Ritter (yellow card) 71'	Report	Delgado (yellow card) 34'

Farrington Field, Fort Worth, Texas

July 11, 2018
19:30
Semifinals

Midland-Odessa Sockers FC	2–3 (a.e.t.)	Houston Dutch Lions FC
Galizzi 90+2'; Galindo (red card) 118'; Fernandes (yellow card) 120+3'; Rodriguez-Becerra 120+4' (pen.)	Report	Rogers 41' (yellow card) 27'; Hastings (yellow card) 108'; Lawal 113'; Powell 120+2'

Grande Communications Stadium, Midland, Texas
July 11, 2018
20:15
Semifinals

Laredo Heat	3–1	Fort Worth Vaqueros FC
G. Rodriguez 61', 80'; Montabes 89'	Report	Da Costa (yellow card) 18'; Brown (yellow card) 44'; O'Shea 59'; Eligwe (yellow card) 60'; Mora (yellow card) 83'

Texas A&M International University Soccer Complex, Laredo, Texas

July 14, 2018
20:15
Final

Laredo Heat	4–3 (a.e.t.)	Houston Dutch Lions FC
J. Rodriguez (yellow card) 41'; Fares 67'; Pietola 74'; Trosten 96', 101'	Report	Rogers 8', 22' (pen.); Pettas (yellow card) 10'; Lauderdale (yellow card) 52'; Covarrubias (yellow card) 82'; Lawal 104'

Texas A&M International University Soccer Complex, Laredo, Texas

==== Heartland Conference Playoffs results ====
Conference Semifinals; July 11
**1**	**FC Wichita**	**4**
4	Saint Louis Club Atletico	0
**2**	**Little Rock Rangers**	**1**
3	Tulsa Athletic	0

Conference Final; July 14
1	FC Wichita	0 (3)
**2**	**Little Rock Rangers**	**0*****(5)**

Bold = winner
* = after extra time, ( ) = penalty shootout score All times Central Daylight Time (UTC−5)

Heartland Conference Playoffs
July 11, 2018
19:00
Semifinals

Little Rock Rangers	1–0	Tulsa Athletic
Hoth (yellow card) 65'; Benamna 90'	Report

War Memorial Stadium, Little Rock, Arkansas
July 11, 2018
19:30
Semifinals

FC Wichita	4–0	Saint Louis Club Atletico
Perez 18'; Clare 40', 61'; Cubero 83'	Report

Carpenter Stadium, Wichita, Kansas

July 14, 2018
19:30
Final

FC Wichita	0–0 (a.e.t.)	Little Rock Rangers
Gomes (yellow card) 105'	Report	Benamna (yellow card) 78'; Watson (yellow card) 78'
Penalties
Clare (penalty scored); Lemons (penalty scored); Ochoa (penalty missed); Tayou (penalty scored)	3–5	(penalty scored) Cordova; (penalty scored) Hlongwane; (penalty scored) Kimishima; (penalty scored) Hoth; (penalty scored) Benamna

Trinity Academy Stadium, Wichita, Kansas

=== West Region conference playoffs results ===
==== Southwest Conference Play-in Game ====
June 30, 2018
17:00 PDT (UTC-7)

#3 Orange County FC	3–0	#4 FC Arizona
J. Bryant 6'; M. Bryant (yellow card) 18' (yellow-red card) 31'; Crisostomo 70' (yellow card) 75'; Collins (yellow card) 82'; Shelton 90'	Report	B. Lynch (yellow card) 26'; Delgadillo-Ortega (yellow card) 29'; Cancela (red card) 82'; Olabarria (red card) 82'

Vanguard University, Costa Mesa, California

=== Regional and National Playoff results ===
Regional Quarterfinals; July 7–14
**GG2**	**FC Golden State**	**4**
SW2	CD Aguiluchos USA	2
SW1	ASC San Diego	1
**SW3**	**Orange County FC**	**3**
**GG1**	**El Farolito**	**2**
GG3	Sonoma County Sol	0
NW1	Spokane SC Shadow	1
**NW2**	**FC Mulhouse Portland**	**2**
MW3	Erie Commodores FC	0
**MW4**	**Cleveland SC**	**4**
**MW5**	**Duluth FC**	**2*****(4)**
MW6	Grand Rapids FC	2 (3)

Regional semifinals July 14–20
**NE1**	**New York Cosmos B**	**2**
NE4	FC Frederick	0
**NE2**	**FC Motown**	**3**
NE3	FC Baltimore	0
W2	FC Golden State	2
**W3**	**Orange County FC**	**4**
W1	El Farolito	0
**W4**	**FC Mulhouse Portland**	**2**
**S2**	**Miami FC 2**	**2**
S4	Atlanta Silverbacks FC	1
S1	Laredo Heat	1
**S3**	**Little Rock Rangers**	**2***
**MW2**	**AFC Ann Arbor**	**1**
MW4	Cleveland SC	0
MW1	Minneapolis City SC	1
**MW5**	**Duluth FC**	**2***

Regional Finals; July 21
NE1	New York Cosmos B	2
**NE2**	**FC Motown**	**3**
W3	Orange County FC	4
**W4**	**FC Mulhouse Portland**	**6**
**S2**	**Miami FC 2**	**3**
S3	Little Rock Rangers	0
MW2	AFC Ann Arbor	3 (3)
**MW5**	**Duluth FC**	**3*****(4)**

National semifinals July 28
**1**	**FC Motown**	**2***
4	FC Mulhouse Portland	1
**2**	**Miami FC 2**	**3**
3	Duluth FC	0

National Final; August 4
1	FC Motown	1
**2**	**Miami FC 2**	**3**

Bold = winner
* = after extra time, ( ) = penalty shootout score

Northeast Region Playoffs
July 18, 2018
19:30 EDT (UTC-4)
Semifinals

New York Cosmos B	2–0	FC Frederick
Bartley 45', 76'	Report

Hofstra University Soccer Stadium, Hempstead, New York
July 18, 2018
20:00 EDT (UTC-4)
Semifinals

FC Motown	3–0	FC Baltimore
Kavanagh 22', 76'; Cordeiro (yellow card) 52'; Katona 78'	Report	Mendes (yellow card) 31'; Boyer (yellow card) 34'

Ranger Stadium, Madison, New Jersey

July 21, 2018
19:30 EDT (UTC-4)
Final

New York Cosmos B	2–3	FC Motown
Szetela (yellow card) 80'; Berterame 90+2', 90+3'	Report	Calderon 53'; Katona 61'; Duka 77' (pen.)

Rocco B. Commisso Soccer Stadium, Manhattan, New York, New York

West Region Playoffs
July 7, 2018
12:00 PDT (UTC-7)
Quarterfinals

El Farolito	2–0	Sonoma County Sol
Rivas 37'; Rodríguez (red card) 62'; Alvarez-Isaza (yellow card) 87'; Campo 90'	Report	Brito (yellow card) 55'; J. Nuño (yellow card) 83'

Boxer Stadium, San Francisco, California
July 7, 2018
19:00 PDT (UTC-7)
Quarterfinals

ASC San Diego	1–3	Orange County FC
Walker 51'; Cardona (yellow card) 58'; Clarke (yellow card) 59'	Report	Montes de Oca 58'; Crisostomo 58'; Collins 84'; Weber (yellow card) 90'

Mission Bay Senior High School, San Diego, California
July 7, 2018
19:00 PDT (UTC-7)
Quarterfinals

Spokane SC Shadow	1–2	FC Mulhouse Portland
Ramos 7'	Report	Thyron 8'; Braun 40' (yellow card) 54'; Omani (yellow card) 85'

Spokane Falls Community College, Spokane, Washington
July 8, 2018
13:00 PDT (UTC-7)
Quarterfinals

FC Golden State	4–2	CD Aguiluchos USA
Silva (yellow card) 28' (goal) 31'; Allisson 45'; Perez (yellow card) 55'; G. Villalobos 68'; Perez-Flores 71'	Report	Aparicio (yellow card) 31'; Rawnsley 58'; Omani (yellow card) 85'; De Souza 90'

Rio Hondo College, Rose Hills, Los Angeles County, California

July 14, 2018
11:30 PDT (UTC-7)
Semifinals

El Farolito	0–2	FC Mulhouse Portland
Rivas (yellow card) 24'; R. Martínez (yellow card) 44'; Ruelas (yellow card) 63'; F. Garcia (yellow card) 69'; Hernández (yellow card) 79'; M. García (yellow card) 89'; Gonzalez (red card) 89'	Report	McKenna 21' (yellow card) 54'; Callahan (yellow card) 25'; Galeano 77'; Middleton (yellow card) 90'

Boxer Stadium, San Francisco, California
July 15, 2018
19:00 PDT (UTC-7)
Semifinals

FC Golden State	2–4	Orange County FC
Silva 22'; J. Villalobos (yellow card) 49'; Perez 84'	Report	Canale 33', 63'; Collins 61'; Crisostomo (yellow card) 88'; Jeon 90'

Rio Hondo College, Rose Hills, Los Angeles County, California

July 21, 2018
19:00 PDT (UTC-7)
Final

Orange County FC	4–6	FC Mulhouse Portland
Canale 10' (yellow card) 90+4'; M. Bryant 27' (yellow card) 67'; Collins 35'; Shelton 53'; Gregory (yellow card) 74'; J. Bryant (red card) 84'	Report	Braun 18', 60'; Thyron 20'; White 29'; McKenna 78'; Galeano 90'

Portola High School, Irvine, California

South Region Playoffs
July 17, 2018
19:00 EDT (UTC-4)
Semifinals

Miami FC 2	2–1	Atlanta Silverbacks FC
McFarlane 22'; Tyrpak 81'; Ruthven (yellow card) 85'	Report	Jules 36'; Bangura (yellow card) 63'; Koloko (red card) 79'

Saint Thomas University Soccer Field, Miami Gardens, Florida
July 17, 2018
20:15 CDT (UTC-5)
Semifinals

Laredo Heat	1–2 (a.e.t.)	Little Rock Rangers
Murray 87'; Espinal (yellow card) 94'; Diaz (yellow card) 110'	Report	Birrou-Essafi (yellow card) 13'; Reed 31'; Hlongwane (yellow card) 84'; Handlin (yellow card) 97'; Benamna 115' (yellow card) 116'; Oshikoya (yellow card) 118'

Texas A&M International University Soccer Complex, Laredo, Texas

July 21, 2018
19:00 EDT (UTC-4)
Final

Miami FC 2	3–0	Little Rock Rangers
Chavez 20'; Mares 41'; Suárez 85'	Report	Doyle (yellow card) 89'

Saint Thomas University Soccer Field, Miami Gardens, Florida

Midwest Region Playoffs
July 13, 2018
19:00 EDT (UTC-4)
Quarterfinals

Erie Commodores FC	0–4	Cleveland SC
Solomon (yellow card) 52' (yellow-red card) 89'; Alatorre (yellow card) 57' (yellow-red card) 57'; Dos Santos (yellow card) 72'	Report	Bell 7', 56', 76'; Manfut 63'; Long (yellow card) 89'

McConnell Family Stadium, Erie, Pennsylvania
July 14, 2018
19:00 CDT (UTC-5)
Quarterfinals

Duluth FC	2–2 (a.e.t.)	Grand Rapids FC
Lucumi-Villegas (yellow card) 27'; Tyrer 46'; Rice 51'	Report	McCarren (yellow card) 32'; Whelan (yellow card) 68' (goal) 83'; Howell 90+2'
Penalties
Garcia-Castro (penalty scored); Ramos (penalty scored); A. Hill (penalty scored); Rice (penalty missed); Farrar (penalty scored)	4–3	(penalty scored) Postlewait; (penalty scored) Howell; (penalty scored) Fazekas; (penalty missed) Vegter; (penalty missed) Broekhuizen

Public Schools Stadium, Duluth, Minnesota

July 20, 2018
16:00 EDT (UTC-4)
Semifinals

Minneapolis City SC	1–2 (a.e.t.)	Duluth FC
McGarrity 36'; Olson (yellow card) 98'; Hamid (yellow card) 105'; Oliver (yellow card) 116'	Report	Farrar 17'; Ramos 115' (pen.); Hoffelner (yellow card) 116'

Riverbank Stadium, Ann Arbor, Michigan
July 20, 2018
19:30 EDT (UTC-4)
Semifinals

AFC Ann Arbor	1–0	Cleveland SC
Turnbull (yellow card) 27'; Liadi (yellow card) 32'; Guglielmi (yellow card) 45'; Gamwanya 55'; Cihan (yellow card) 88'	Report	Suljevic (yellow card) 17'; Musa (red card) 90'

Riverbank Stadium, Ann Arbor, Michigan

July 21, 2018
19:30 EDT (UTC-4)
Final

AFC Ann Arbor	3–3 (a.e.t.)	Duluth FC
Odhiambo 23' (yellow card) 120+2'; Cawley 42' (yellow card) 45+3'; Nojueira (yellow card) 45+5'; Gamwanya (yellow card) 70'; Liadi 90+4'; Shaikly (yellow card) 120+4'; Turnbull (yellow card) 120+4'	Report	Tyrer 12'; 24' (o.g.); Farrar 39'; Corcoran (yellow card) 44'; Moore (yellow card) 80'; Garcia-Castro (yellow card) 84'; Adika (yellow card) 120+4'
Penalties
Cawley (penalty scored); Braem (penalty missed); Gamwanya (penalty scored); Shaikly (penalty missed); Breitmeyer (penalty scored)	3–4	(penalty scored) Ramos; (penalty scored) Lucumi-Villegas; (penalty scored) Ben-Tal; (penalty missed) A. Hill; (penalty scored) Moore

Riverbank Stadium, Ann Arbor, Michigan

National Playoffs
July 28, 2018
19:00 EDT (UTC-4)
Semifinals

Miami FC 2	3–0	Duluth FC
Martínez 37' (pen.); McFarlane 75' (yellow card) 85'; Michaud 90'	Report	Tyrer (yellow card) 90'

Saint Thomas University Soccer Field, Miami Gardens, Florida
Attendance: 1,789
July 28, 2018
19:30 EDT (UTC-4)
Semifinals

FC Motown	2–1 (a.e.t.)	FC Mulhouse Portland
Chronis (yellow card) 1'; Cordeiro (yellow card) 51'; Duka 55'; Calderon (yellow card) 100'; Garcia (yellow card) 115'; D. Nigro 120+1'	Report	McKenna (yellow card) 42'; N. Evans 63'; Lins (yellow card) 116'

Ranger Stadium, Madison, New Jersey
Attendance: 768

August 4, 2018
19:30 EDT (UTC-4)
Final

FC Motown	1–3	Miami FC 2
Riordan (yellow card) 10' (yellow-red card) 58'; Duka 35'; Becerra (yellow card) 86' (yellow-red card) 90+3'; Cordeiro (yellow card) 90+3'	Report	Steele 33' (yellow card) 34'; Mares 59'; Michaud 81'

Ranger Stadium, Madison, New Jersey
Attendance: 2,143

== U.S. Open Cup qualification ==
The NPSL ranks its top 30 clubs based on results of the 2018 season for the purposes of qualification for the 2019 U.S. Open Cup. The NPSL champion earns the top ranking, and the other finalist is second. The national semifinal loser from the region with the larger number of teams is ranked third, and the remaining national semifinalist is ranked fourth. The four regional final losers are ranked fifth through eighth based on the number of teams in their region, from largest to smallest. The remaining 22 slots in the rankings are allocated among the regions based on their sizes. The total number of slots allocated to each region are South 9, Northeast 8, Midwest 7 and West 6. Since the United States Soccer Federation has not yet determined how many berths NPSL clubs will be awarded in the U.S. Open Cup, each of the 22 slots available in the rankings for teams that did not reach the region finals are each allocated to a specific region. This ensures that, regardless of the number of berths awarded to NPSL clubs, the berths will have been allocated as fairly as possible, taking into account the relative sizes of the regions. The allocation of the ninth through 30th slots for this season is as follows:

Region	Position
South	9, 12, 15, 19, 22, 25, 28
Northeast	10, 14, 17, 21, 26, 29
Midwest	11, 16, 20, 24, 30
West	13, 18, 23, 27

Starting with the ninth slot, no conference that already has a team in the rankings may have an additional team claim a slot, until every conference in the region has at least one team in the rankings. Ties in the standings are broken using regular-season conference tiebreaker procedures.

Pos	Team	APPG	Explanation
1	Miami FC 2	N/A	NPSL champion
2	FC Motown	N/A	NPSL finalist
3	Duluth FC	N/A	Midwest Region champion (22 clubs)
4	FC Mulhouse Portland	N/A	West Region champion (20 clubs)
5	Little Rock Rangers	N/A	South Region finalist (30 clubs)
6	New York Cosmos B	N/A	Northeast Region finalist (26 clubs)
7	AFC Ann Arbor	N/A	Midwest Region finalist (22 clubs)
8	Orange County FC	N/A	West Region finalist (20 clubs)
9	Laredo Heat	3	Representing Lone Star Conference
10	FC Baltimore	N/A	Representing Mid-Atlantic Conference
11	Erie Commodores FC	N/A	Representing East Conference
12	Chattanooga FC	2	Representing Southeast Conference
13	El Farolito	N/A	Representing Golden Gate Conference
14	Junior Lone Star FC	2.4	Northeast Region #4 club
15	Midland-Odessa Sockers FC	2.2 (Note: The teams have identical records. Midland-Odessa wins the tiebreaker on average goal difference per game, 2.2 to 1.3.)	South Region #5 club
16	Minneapolis City SC	2.4	Midwest Region #4 club
17	Brooklyn Italians	2.2	Northeast Region #5 club
18	ASC San Diego	2.3	West Region #4 club
19	FC Wichita	2.2	South Region #6 club
20	Cleveland SC	2	Midwest Region #5 club
21	West Chester United SC	2.1	Northeast Region #6 club
22	Houston Dutch Lions FC	2.1	South Region #7 club
23	FC Golden State	2.2 (Note: Golden State wins the tiebreaker on average wins per game, 0.7 to 0.6.)	West Region #5 club
24	Grand Rapids FC	1.9	Midwest Region #6 club
25	Fort Worth Vaqueros FC	2 (Note: Fort Worth wins the tiebreaker on average wins per game, 0.60 to 0.58.)	South Region #8 club
26	Hartford City FC	1.9 (Note: All three teams have identical records. Hartford City wins the tiebreaker over Monmouth and Northern Virginia on average goal difference per game, 0.6 to 0.3. Since Monmouth and Northern Virginia have identical records and goal differences, a coin flip would break the tie, if necessary, i.e. if the NPSL is allocated at least 29 slots in the U.S. Open Cup.)	Northeast Region #7 club
27	Spokane SC Shadow	2.2	West Region #6 club
28	Jacksonville Armada FC	2	South Region #9 club
29	FC Monmouth	1.9	Northeast Region #8 club
29	Northern Virginia United FC	1.9	Northeast Region #8 club
30	Rochester Lancers	1.8	Midwest Region #7 club

== Statistics ==
=== Top goalscorers ===
The NPSL's top ten goalscorers for the 2018 season were as follows:

Pos	Player	Club	Goals
1	(Mexico) Omar Nuño	Sonoma County Sol	20
2	(United States) Chase Wright	Minnesota TwinStars FC	14
2	(United States) Cody Golbad	Academica SC	14
4	(United States) Edson Cardona	El Farolito SC	13
5	(United States) Fabrice Comla Dogbey	Rhode Island Reds F.C.	11
5	(United States) Damani Camara	FC Columbus	11
5	(England) Simon Rawnsley	CD Aguiluchos USA	11
5	(Italy) Claudio Repetto	Med City FC	11
9	(Jamaica) Amani Walker	ASC San Diego	10
9	(United States) Josh Fawole	FC Baltimore	10

=== Awards ===
The NPSL presented the awards shown in the table below in 2018.

Award	Recipient	Club/Affiliation
Golden Ball (best player)	(United States) Matt Nigro	FC Motown
Golden Glove (best goalkeeper)	(Germany) Jan Hoffelner	Duluth FC
Coach of the Year	(United States) Carlos Mendes	New York Cosmos B
Referee of the Year	Michael Dee	Northeast Region
Referee of the Year	Turan Oz	West Region
Referee of the Year	Austin Saini	Midwest Region
Referee of the Year	Andres Vidales	South Region
Walter Chyzowych Lifetime Achievement Award	(Poland) John Kowalski	Fort Pitt Regiment
Supporter of the Year	Leithan "Lugnut" Allen	Greenville FC
NPSL Final Man of the Match	(United States) Dylan Mares	Miami FC 2

The NPSL National XI shown below were selected by teams, media and supporters through an online voting process.

Position	Player	Club
Goalkeeper	(Germany) Jan Hoffelner	Duluth FC
Defenders	(Kenya) Joseph Okumu	AFC Ann Arbor
Defenders	(United States) Ben Watson	Little Rock Rangers
Defenders	(United States) Tom Judge	FC Monmouth
Midfielders	(United States) Matt Nigro	FC Motown
Midfielders	(Panama) Max Stiegwardt	Minneapolis City SC
Midfielders	(United States) Dylan Mares	Miami FC 2
Midfielders	(United States) Daniel Crisostomo	Orange County FC
Forwards	(United States) Cody Golbad	Academica SC
Forwards	(United States) Memo Diaz	Laredo Heat
Forwards	(United States) Edson Cardona	El Farolito

== See also ==
- 2018 U.S. Open Cup
- 2018 Hank Steinbrecher Cup
- 2019 U.S. Open Cup qualification
