= 2018 Hank Steinbrecher Cup =

Tournament details
- Country: United States of America
- Dates: June 1 – 2, 2018
- Teams: 4

Final positions
- Champions: Michigan Bucks (2nd title)
- Runners-up: Charlotte Eagles

Tournament statistics
- Matches played: 4
- Goals scored: 15 (3.75 per match)

The 2018 Hank Steinbrecher Cup was the sixth edition of the United States Adult Soccer Association's (USASA) tournament whose winner is recognized with the title of U.S. National Amateur Champions.

Premier Development League (PDL) side Michigan Bucks successfully defended their title.

== Host selection ==
Veterans Memorial Stadium in New Britain, Connecticut was selected as the host venue for the tournament.

== Teams ==
=== Qualification ===
The tournament featured the 2017 PDL champion Charlotte Eagles, the 2017 National Professional Soccer League (NPSL) champion Elm City Express, the 2017 USASA National Amateur Cup winner Lansdowne Bhoys FC and the defending Steinbrecher Cup winner Michigan Bucks.

=== Draw and schedule ===
The draw to determine semifinal matchups took place on March 23, 2018 at Toyota Park in Bridgeview, Illinois. The Lansdowne Bhoys FC drew the Charlotte Eagles in the first semifinal, and the Michigan Bucks were matched against the Elm City Express in the second semifinal. The semifinal matches were scheduled to take place on June 1, followed by the third-place and final matches on June 2.

== Matches ==
=== Bracket ===
Semifinals
NAC	Lansdowne Bhoys FC	2
PDL	Charlotte Eagles	6*
Def.	Michigan Bucks	2
NPSL	Elm City Express	0

Final
PDL	Charlotte Eagles	0
Def.	Michigan Bucks	2
Third Place
NAC	Lansdowne Bhoys FC	2
NPSL	Elm City Express	1

* = after extra time

=== Semifinals ===
June 1, 2018	Lansdowne Bhoys FC	2–6 (a.e.t.)	Charlotte Eagles	New Britain, Connecticut
17:00 EDT	Voltaire 64'; Zarges 87'	Report	Seagrist 6', 111'; Roscoe 34'; Brennan 97', 113'; Madison 105+1'	Stadium: Veterans Memorial Stadium

June 1, 2018	Michigan Bucks	2–0	Elm City Express	New Britain, Connecticut
19:30 EDT	Goldsmith 15'; Cissé 79'	USASA Report; MIB Report	Oliveira (red card) 43'	Stadium: Veterans Memorial Stadium

=== Third-Place Match ===
June 2, 2018	Lansdowne Bhoys FC	2–1	Elm City Express	New Britain, Connecticut
17:00 EDT	Esteves 5'; 90+3'	Report	Saunchez 34'	Stadium: Veterans Memorial Stadium

=== Final ===
June 2, 2018	Charlotte Eagles	0–2	Michigan Bucks	New Britain, Connecticut
19:30 EDT		USASA Report; MIB Report	Goldsmith 62'; Ricci 79'	Stadium: Veterans Memorial Stadium

== See also ==
- 2017 NPSL season
- 2017 PDL season
