= Reed McKenna =

American soccer player (born 1992)

Personal information
- Full name: Reed Anthony McKenna
- Date of birth: August 8, 1992 (age 34)
- Place of birth: Columbus, Ohio, U.S.
- Height: 1.78 m (5 ft 10 in)
- Position: Forward

Team information
- Current team: FC Mulhouse Portland

Youth career
- 2008–2010: Nomads SC
- 2010–2011: San Diego Surf

College career
| Years | Team | Apps | (Gls) |
| 2011–2012 | UCLA Bruins | | |
| 2013–2014 | UC Santa Barbara Gauchos | | |

Senior career*
| Years | Team | Apps | (Gls) |
| 2011–2012 | Orange County Blue Star | 8 | (0) |
| 2013–2014 | Portland Timbers U23s | 11 | (1) |
| 2015 | Oklahoma City Energy FC | 2 | (0) |
| 2016–2018 | Ventura County Fusion | 10 | (5) |
| 2018–2019 | FC Mulhouse Portland | 9 | (4) |
- * Club domestic league appearances and goals as of 13 May 2019

Reed Anthony McKenna (born August 8, 1992) is an American soccer player who currently plays for FC Mulhouse Portland in the National Premier Soccer League.

== Early life and education ==
McKenna was born in Columbus, Ohio on August 8, 1992. His family relocated to Hawaii, where he attended Punahou School as a freshman and played on their varsity boys soccer team. He would later relocate with his family to San Diego, where McKenna attended Rancho Bernardo High School. He finished his high school career in San Diego and was named as an ESPN RISE first-team All-American.

He enrolled at the University of California, Los Angeles, where he played collegiate soccer. In his two seasons with the Bruins, he made 16 appearances.

After the 2012 season, McKenna transferred to University of California, Santa Barbara. During his time with the Gauchos men's soccer team, he made a total of 41 appearances and tallied four goals and two assists.

McKenna also played in the Premier Development League for Orange County Blue Star and Portland Timbers U23s while enrolled in college.

== Career ==
On March 12, 2015, McKenna signed a professional contract with USL club Oklahoma City Energy FC. Two months later, he made his professional debut in a 2–2 draw against Whitecaps FC 2. He made two appearances for the club.
