= Palm Beach United (NPSL) =

- Full name: Palm Beach United
- Founded: January 23, 2017; 9 years ago
- Stadium: South Fork High School
- President: Trevor Adair
- League: NPSL
- 2017: Inaugural Season
- Website: http://www.beachesfc.com

Palm Beach United, formerly Beaches FC, is an American soccer club based in Jupiter, Florida. They play in the Sunshine Conference of the National Premier Soccer League.

The team colors are orange and blue.

== History ==
Beaches FC was announced as a National Premier Soccer League expansion team on January 25, 2017. The club's ownership is composed of Trevor Adair and Levent Guler. Adair is a former coach of the Brown Bears and the Clemson Tigers men's soccer programs. Guler is the head coach of the West Boca Raton High School's boys varsity soccer team.

In 2018 the team was rebranded as Palm Beach United.
