= El Farolito =

El Farolito (Spanish for little lantern or lighthouse) may refer to:

- Taqueria El Farolito, a Mexican restaurant chain in the San Francisco Bay Area
- El Farolito SC, a soccer team in San Francisco, United States
- El Farolito (song), a song by Dominican singer Juan Luis Guerra
