= Elm City Express =

- Full name: Elm City Express
- Short name: Professional Team
- Founded: January 9, 2017
- Dissolved: 2019; 7 years ago
- Stadium: Jess Dow Field; New Haven, Connecticut
- Capacity: 6,000
- Owner: Zack Henry
- Head coach: Teddy Haley
- League: NPSL
- 2018: 4th, North Atlantic Conference
Home colors

Elm City Express was a men's soccer club based in New Haven, Connecticut that most recently competed in the National Premier Soccer League. The club's colors are blue and white, and plays its home matches at Jess Dow Field at Southern Connecticut State University. The ownership group of Elm City Express also owns and operates Clube Atlético Tubarão, a Brazilian soccer club based in Santa Catarina, which competes in the lower levels of Brazil's pyramid.

== History ==
Elm City Express was founded in 2017 by Zack Henry.

In their inaugural season, The Express won the 2017 NPSL Championship by defeating Midland-Odessa FC 5–0 on August 12, 2017, at Reese Stadium in New Haven.

In January 2019, Elm City announced they would be taking a hiatus for the 2019 season and Zack Henry would no longer be president of the team.

=== Front office ===
- Luiz Henrique Martins Ribeiro – vice president
- Brian Neumeyer – general manager
- Eric Da Costa – technical director

== Year-by-year ==
Year	Division	League	Record	Regular season	Playoffs	Open Cup
2017	4	NPSL	9–1–2	1st, Atlantic Blue Conference	National Champions	Did not enter
2018	4	NPSL	5-3-2	4th, North Atlantic Conference	1st Round	3rd Round

== Honors ==
National Premier Soccer League

- National Playoffs
  - Champions: 2017
- Northeast Region
  - Champions: 2017
- Atlantic Blue Conference
  - Champions: 2017

== Notable players ==
- Joshua Calderón, defender; Puerto Rico men's national team
- Matt Jones; goalkeeper; assistant coach of the Quinnipiac Bobcats

== See also ==
- Hartford City FC
- New Haven United FC
