= Oxnard Guerreros FC =

American soccer team

- Full name: Oxnard Guerreros Football Club
- Founded: 30 November 2016; 8 years ago
- Stadium: Del Sol Stadium
- Owner: Ty Otto
- Head Coach: Javier Figueroa
- League: NPSL/UPSL
- 2017: Established 2016
- Website: https://oxnardguerrerosfc.com/

Oxnard Guerreros FC is a semi-professional men's soccer club based in Oxnard, California. The club currently competes in the National Premier Soccer League in the Southwest Conference, having joined the league as an expansion team in 2016. The Guerreros joined the United Premier Soccer League Socal North Division 1 as an expansion team in 2019.

Oxnard Guerreros FC (OGFC) is primarily geared toward local athletes making the jump from development and amateur clubs to professional soccer.

== Current 2020 Guerreros ==
=== Front office ===
- (United States) (Australia) Ty Otto - Founder
- (United States) Fred Mendoza - Team Manager
- (United States) (Mexico) Joseph Escudero - Public Relations
- (United States) (Mexico) Salvador "Chava" Orozco - Public Relations

=== Coaches ===
- (United States) (Mexico) Javier Figueroa - Head Coach
- (United States) (Mexico) Salvador "Chava" Orozco - Assistant Coach
- (United States) Fred Mendoza - Assistant Coach
- (Mexico) Profe Pina - Goalkeeper Coach

=== NPSL Spring/Summer ===
Rank	Team	Pts/GP
1	FC Golden State	0
2	FC Arizona	0
3	ASC San Diego	0
4	Orange County FC	0
5	A.S. Los Angeles	0
6	Temecula FC	0
7	Oxnard Guerreros FC	0
8	Riverside Xolos U23	0
9	High Desert Elite FC	0
10	Las Vegas Legends FC	0

=== UPSL Winter/Fall ===
Rank	Team	Points
1	Santa Ana Winds	0
2	Orange County FC	0
3	LA10	0
4	MAFO FC	0
5	Oxnard Guerreros FC	0
6	CAL FC	0
7	Alta California Sol	0
8	Lionside FC	0
9	Sporting San Fernando	0
10	Inland Empire FC	0
11	Disciples FC	0
12	Injen Total Football USA	0
13	A.S. Los Angeles	0

== History ==
The club was founded by Ty Otto October 2016 with the Inaugural Season starting January 2017 .

=== 2019 Summary ===
2019 was a year of growth for the Oxnard Guerreros. OGFC had their best NPSL Season to date and joined the top flight of the UPSL's Southwest Conference - Qualifying for Playoffs on the first attempt. Additionally, the Guerreros participated in the U.S. Open Qualifiers for the first time in club history.

2019 Saw a change in head coaches when Javier Figueroa, previously the "Guerreros Dos" Coach, was promoted to Manage the main team replacing Juan Florez in June during the NPSL season.

==== Front office ====
- (United States) (Australia) Ty Otto - Founder
- (United States) Lukas Antioho - General Manager
- (United States) (Mexico) Joseph Escudero - Public Relations
- (United States) (Mexico) Salvador "Chava" Orozco - Public Relations

==== Coaches ====
- (United States) (Mexico) Javier Figueroa - Head Coach
- (United States) (Mexico) Salvador "Chava" Orozco - Assistant Coach
- (United States) Fred Mendoza - Assistant Coach

==== NPSL Spring/Summer ====
Rank	Team	Pts/GP
1	FC Golden State	2.5556
2	FC Arizona	2.2778
3	ASC San Diego	2.0556
4	Orange County FC	2
5	A.S. Los Angeles	1.3333
6	Temecula FC	1.2222
7	Oxnard Guerreros FC	0.9444
8	Riverside Coras	0.6667
9	High Desert Elite FC	0.6667
10	City of Angels	0.6111

==== UPSL Winter/Fall ====
Rank	Team	Points
1	Santa Ana Winds	34
2	Orange County FC	31
3	LA10	23
4	MAFO FC	23
5	Oxnard Guerreros FC	21
6	CAL FC	19
7	Alta California Sol	18
8	Lionside FC	13
9	Sporting San Fernando	12
10	Inland Empire FC	9
11	Disciples FC	8
12	Injen Total Football USA	7
13	A.S. Los Angeles	2

==== UPSL Playoffs ====
Round 1 - 15 December 2019

Away vs MAFO FC - W 3-4

Round 2 - 22 December 2019

Away vs Orange County FC - L 5-1

==== 2020 U.S. Open Qualifiers ====
The Oxnard Guerreros competed in the 2020 U.S. Open Qualifiers, Defeating Outbreak FC 7-1 and Santa Monica United 2-0 but fell to CAL FC 2–1 in the final qualifying round.

==== 2019 Standout Athletes ====
- Brenton Frame scored the most goals for OGFC in the NPSL (6)
- Raul Gonzalez scored the most goals in the UPSL regular season (21)
- Raul Gonzalez scored the most goals during 2020 U.S. Open Qualification (3)
- Angel Cervantes recorded the most Clean Sheets as Goalkeeper during the NPSL and UPSL Seasons along with the U.S. OPEN

=== 2017 Summary ===
(United States) (Brazil) Paulo Monlleo - Head Coach

(United States) (Spain) Julio Cesar Gomez De La Torre - Assistant Coach

(United States) Robb Bolton - General Manager

(United States) Lukas Antioho - Assistant General Manager

(United States) (Mexico) Salvador "Chava" Orozco - Public Relations

2017 Saw the Guerreros find their feet; hiring coaches and conducting tryouts. Oxnard Guerreros first signing was Honorary Team Member, Cancer Survivor Alex Hernandez.

Hires included General Manager Robb Bolton, Assistant GM Lukas Antioho, Public Relations Salvador Orozco, Head Coach Paulo Monlleo and Assistant Coach Julio Cesar Gomez De La Torre. Paulo Monlleo and Julio Cesar Gomez De La Torre were replaced by Ross Greaney after a dismal Inaugural season in the NPSL finishing second to last.

=== 2018 Summary ===
(Colombia) Juan Florez - Head Coach

(United States) Robb Bolton - General Manager

(United States) (Mexico) Salvador "Chava" Orozco - Public Relations

(United States) (Mexico) Joseph Escudero - Public Relations

Juan Florez was appointed as head Coach replacing Ross Greaney before Greaneys first match in charge. 2018 Saw the Guerreros finish mid-table in the NPSL. The Oxnard Guerreros Hosted a friendly in the off-season against ex-professional Liga Mx players. The Guerreros would win the friendly against Leyendas Liga MX 6–3, with standout

(Colombia) Juan Florez - Head Coach

Coach Florez brings with him an abundance of experience, both as a coach and player, previously earning multiple playoff appearances as head coach of both the San Fernando Valley Eagles (USISL) and the San Fernando Quakes (PDL). Florez also held tenure as head coach of the LAFC affiliate LA Blues (now the OC Blues) and currently serves as head coach of the LA Galaxy's Conejo Valley Pre-Academy. Florez struck out on his own at 18, leaving his home country of Colombia to pursue a shot at American collegiate sports. He capitalized on a chance at Cal State University Northridge, where he led the Matadors to the NCAA Tournament finals as a starting midfielder, then went on to play for two professional Colombian teams, Millonarios and América de Cali. Florez returned to CSUN as an assistant coach and offensive strategist, where he would help guide them to back-to-back tournament appearances and craft one of the top offenses in the nation.
