= Roger Da Costa =

South African football player

Personal information
- Full name: Roger Frank Da Costa
- Date of birth: 22 April 1986 (age 40)
- Place of birth: Johannesburg, South Africa
- Height: 1.90 m (6 ft 3 in)
- Position: Defender

Team information
- Current team: Aris Limassol

Youth career
- Tyler Junior College
- Austin Aztex U23

Senior career*
Years	Team	Apps	(Gls)
2010–2014	Moroka Swallows	63	(3)
2014–2015	Mpumalanga Black Aces F.C.	20	(2)
2015–2016	Aris Limassol	8	(2)
- * Club domestic league appearances and goals as of 15 September 2016

Roger Da Costa (born 22 April 1986 in Johannesburg, Gauteng) is a South African football player who plays as a defender for Aris Limassol. He previously played for Moroka Swallows and Mpumalanga Black Aces.
