= Manuel García (footballer, born 31 July 1988) =

Mexican footballer

Personal information
- Full name: Manuel Alejandro García Muñiz
- Date of birth: 31 July 1988 (age 38)
- Place of birth: Cuernavaca, Mexico
- Height: 1.74 m (5 ft 9 in)
- Position: Defender

Youth career
- América

Senior career*
Years	Team	Apps	(Gls)
2007–2011	América	19	(0)
2007-2009	→ Socio Águila Fútbol Club (loan)	36	(0)
2010-2011	→ San Luis (loan)	10	(0)
2011-2012	Unión		
2012-2014	Ballenas	16	(0)
2014-2015	Irapuato	8	(0)
2015-2017	Murciélagos		
- * Club domestic league appearances and goals

Manuel Alejandro García Muñíz (born 31 July 1988) is a Mexican professional footballer who played as a defender.
