= Arnhold Rivas =

Mexican footballer (born 1989)

Personal information
- Full name: Arnhold Rivas Martinez
- Date of birth: 13 June 1989 (age 37)
- Place of birth: Guadalajara, Jalisco, Mexico
- Height: 1.72 m (5 ft 8 in)
- Position: Forward

Senior career*
Years	Team	Apps	(Gls)
2007–2012	Estudiantes Tecos	26	(3)
2009–2011	→ Club América (loan)	3	(0)
2011	→ Querétaro F.C. (loan)	0	(0)
2013	Murciélagos FC	13	(3)
2013	Cimarrones de Sonora	7	(0)
2014	Vaqueros de Ameca	13	(0)
2014	Tampico Madero	5	(0)
2015	Atlético Chiapas	11	(0)

International career^{‡}
2008	Mexico	1	(0)
- * Club domestic league appearances and goals ‡ National team caps and goals as of 24 September 2008

Arnhold Rivas Martínez (born 13 June 1989) is a Mexican former footballer. The start of his career was good; he put in impressive performances, this culminated in him earning a debut cap in the Mexico national football team. Despite a seemingly bright start to his playing career, his consistently poor conduct began to be his downfall as he was loaned at first to América and then to Querétaro F.C. His poor behaviour stretched through into his time at Querétaro and the manager, Gustavo Matosas forced him to leave the team due to bad behavior along with Jairo Castillo. This decision came after a 5–0 loss to Toluca.

== International Caps ==
As of 24 September 2008

International appearances
#	Date	Venue	Opponent	Result	Competition
1.	24 September 2008	Memorial Coliseum, Los Angeles, United States	Chile	0–1	Friendly
