= Long Island University Field =

Sports venue in Brooklyn, New York, US

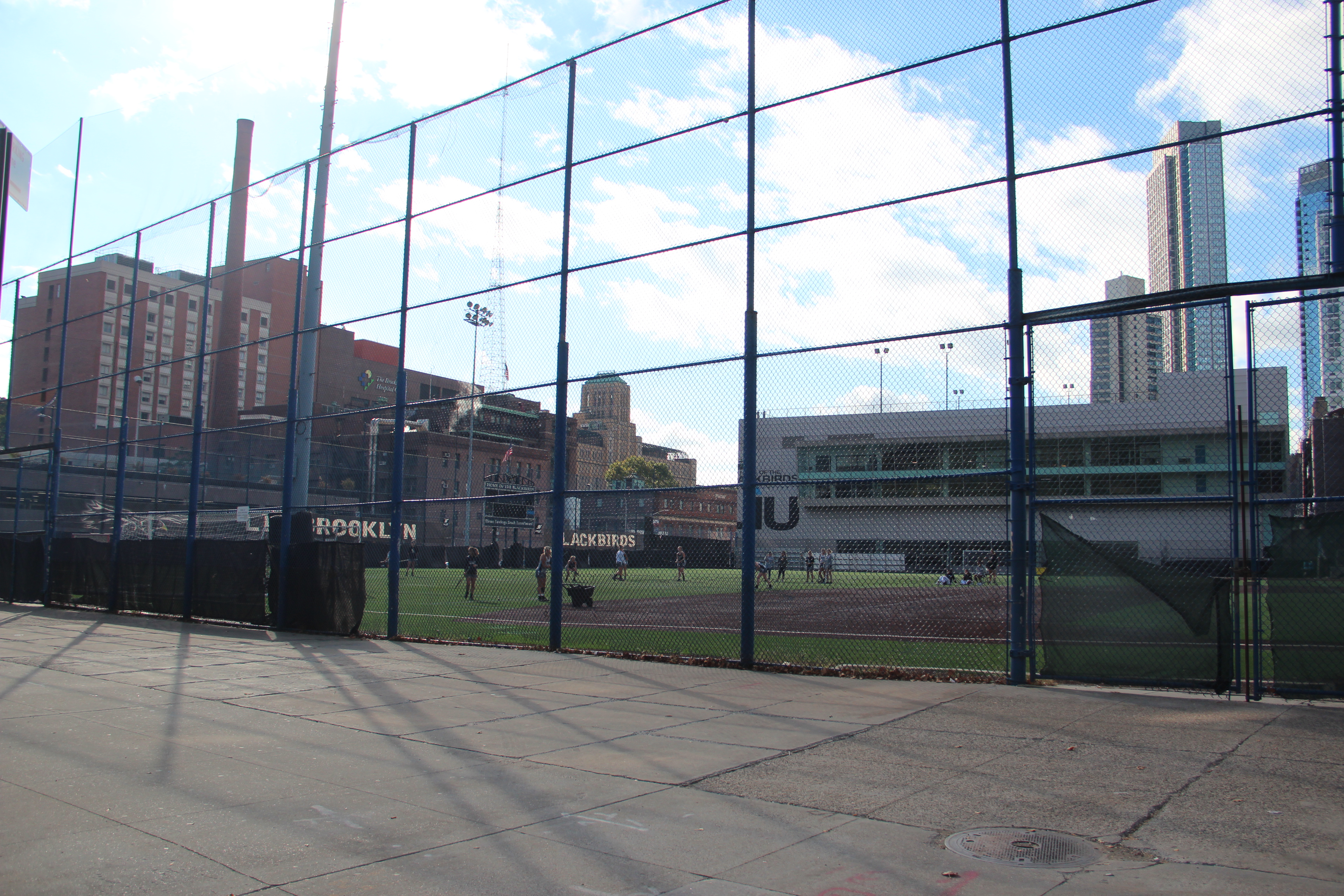
- Interactive map of Long Island University Field
- Location: 161 Ashland Place, Brooklyn, New York, USA
- Coordinates: 40.691763°N 73.980138°W
- Owner: Long Island University
- Operator: Long Island University
- Capacity: 2,000 (soccer), 500 (baseball and softball)
- Surface: AstroTurf GameDay Grass 3D

Tenants
- LIU Brooklyn Blackbirds baseball, men's and women's soccer, women's lacrosse, softball (NEC, until 2019)

Long Island University Field is a baseball, soccer, and softball venue in Brooklyn, New York, United States. It was home to the LIU Brooklyn Blackbirds baseball, men's and women's soccer, women's lacrosse, and softball teams of the NCAA Division I Northeast Conference until 2019, when LIU Brooklyn merged its athletics teams with those of LIU Post into a single unit, henceforth known as the Sharks, competing in Division I. Since then, the LIU baseball, soccer, women's lacrosse, and softball teams now play at the Post campus in Brookville, east of Brooklyn. The venue, which features an artificial turf surface, has a capacity of 2,000 spectators for soccer and lacrosse and 500 spectators for baseball and softball.
