= Mohammed Issahaku =

Ghanaian footballer

Kevin Mohammed Issahaku
Personal information
- Full name: Kevin Mohammed Issahaku
- Date of birth: October 25, 1990 (age 36)
- Place of birth: Tamale, Ghana
- Height: 1.88 m (6 ft 2 in)
- Position: Defender

Team information
- Current team: Atlanta United 2/ Atlanta Silverbacs

Youth career
- 2010: Georgia Perimeter Jaguars/ University of North Georgia 2012

Senior career*
Years	Team	Apps	(Gls)
2013–2014	Atlanta Silverbacks		
2014	FAS	41	(19)
2015	Atlanta Silverbacks	17	(4)
- * Club domestic league appearances and goals as of 23 February 2016

Kevin Mohammed Bin Issahaku (born October 25, 1990) is a Ghanaian footballer who last played for Atlanta Silverbacks in the NASL.

== Career ==
=== Professional ===
Issahaku spent time with NPSL side Atlanta Silverbacks Reserves in 2013 and 2014. He moved to El Salvadorian club FAS in 2014 before returning to Atlanta in 2015.
