= Oliver Roberts (footballer) =

English footballer

Personal information
- Full name: Oliver James Roberts
- Date of birth: 23 September 1996 (age 30)
- Place of birth: Ashton-under-Lyne, England
- Position: Midfielder

Team information
- Current team: Atherton Collieries

Youth career
- –2012: Stockport County
- 2012–2015: Stoke City

Senior career*
Years	Team	Apps	(Gls)
2015–2016	Stoke City	0	(0)
2015	→ Tamworth (loan)	6	(0)
2016–2017	Fleetwood Town	0	(0)
2017–2018	Stalybridge Celtic	45	(4)
2018	New Orleans Jesters		
2018	Mickleover Sports		
2018	Buxton		
2018–2019	Atherton Collieries	21	(2)
2019–2021	Trafford		
2021–2022	Colne	36	(3)
2022–	Atherton Collieries	0	(0)
- * Club domestic league appearances and goals as of 14:00, 1 July 2022 (UTC)

Oliver James Roberts (born 23 September 1996) is an English professional footballer who plays as a midfielder for Atherton Collieries.

== Club career ==
After joining Stoke City from Stockport County in 2012, Roberts spent three years in the Stoke academy before joining Tamworth on loan in October 2015. On 3 October 2015, Roberts made his Tamworth debut in Tamworth's 2–0 away defeat against Curzon Ashton, replacing Paul Green at half time. Roberts went onto make five more appearances for Tamworth before being recalled by Stoke in November 2015.

On 22 August 2016, Roberts joined League One side Fleetwood Town on a one-year deal with an option of an extra twelve months. On 9 November 2016, Roberts made his Fleetwood Town debut in an EFL Trophy tie against Carlisle United, in which Fleetwood suffered a 4–2 defeat. On 18 May 2017, it was announced that Roberts would leave Fleetwood upon the expiry of his contract in June 2017.

On 4 August 2017, following his release from Fleetwood, Roberts joined Northern Premier League Premier Division side Stalybridge Celtic. Just over a week later, he made his debut for Stalybridge Celtic during their 1–0 home victory over Nantwich Town, featuring for 80 minutes before being replaced by Lassana Mendes.

In July 2018, Roberts joined Mickleover Sports after spending time in the National Premier Soccer League with New Orleans Jesters. In December 2018, Roberts joined Atherton Collieries.

On 30 June 2022, Roberts returned to Atherton Collieries.

== Career statistics ==
As of match played 28 April 2018.

Club	Season	League			FA Cup		League Cup		Other		Total	
Club	Season	Division	Apps	Goals	Apps	Goals	Apps	Goals	Apps	Goals	Apps	Goals
Tamworth (loan)	2015–16	National League North	6	0	0	0	—		0	0	6	0
Fleetwood Town	2016–17	League One	0	0	0	0	0	0	1 (Note: Appearance(s) in EFL Trophy)	0	1	0
Stalybridge Celtic	2017–18	Northern Premier League Premier Division	45	4	2	0	—		5 (Note: Four appearances in FA Trophy, one in Northern Premier League Challenge Cup)	0	52	4
Career total			51	4	2	0	0	0	6	0	59	4
