= List of Major League Lacrosse stadiums =

This is a list of stadiums previously used in Major League Lacrosse (MLL), a men's field lacrosse league in the United States and Canada. The MLL was founded in 1999 and had their first season in 2001 with six teams. In December 2020, the MLL and PLL (Premier Lacrosse League) merged and formally exist as the Premier Lacrosse League. The Boston Cannons, now rebranded as the Cannons Lacrosse Club, was one of the founding teams of the MLL and is the only team still active after the merger.

All Major League Lacrosse stadiums
Team (former names)	Stadium	Years used	Capacity	Opened	City
Atlanta Blaze (2016–2019)	Fifth Third Bank Stadium	2016–2018	8,318	2010	Kennesaw, Georgia
Atlanta Blaze (2016–2019)	Grady Stadium	2019	8,000	1948	Atlanta, Georgia
Atlanta Blaze (2016–2019)	Atlanta Silverbacks Park	2019	5,000	2006	Atlanta, Georgia
Boston Cannons (2001–2020)
Boston Cannons (2001–2020)	Veterans Memorial Stadium	2019–2020	5,000	1938	Quincy, Massachusetts
Boston Cannons (2001–2020)	Harvard Stadium	2016–2018	30,323	1903	Boston, Massachusetts
Boston Cannons (2001–2020)	Gillette Stadium	2015	66,829	2002	Foxborough, Massachusetts
Boston Cannons (2001–2020)	Harvard Stadium	2007–2014	30,323	1903	Boston, Massachusetts
Boston Cannons (2001–2020)	Nickerson Field	2004–2006	10,412	1915	Boston, Massachusetts
Boston Cannons (2001–2020)	Cawley Memorial Stadium	2001–2003	6,000	1996	Lowell, Massachusetts
Charlotte Hounds (2012–2018)	American Legion Memorial Stadium	2012–2018	17,000	1936	Charlotte, North Carolina
Chesapeake Bayhawks (2010–2020) (Washington Bayhawks 2007–2009) (Baltimore Bayhawks 2001–2006)	Navy–Marine Corps Memorial Stadium	2008–2020	34,000	1959	Annapolis, Maryland
Chesapeake Bayhawks (2010–2020) (Washington Bayhawks 2007–2009) (Baltimore Bayhawks 2001–2006)	George Mason Stadium	2007–2008	5,000	1981	Fairfax, Virginia
Chesapeake Bayhawks (2010–2020) (Washington Bayhawks 2007–2009) (Baltimore Bayhawks 2001–2006)	Multi-Sport Field	2007	2,500	2005	Washington, D. C.
Chesapeake Bayhawks (2010–2020) (Washington Bayhawks 2007–2009) (Baltimore Bayhawks 2001–2006)	Johnny Unitas Stadium	2004–2006	11,198	2002	Towson, Maryland
Chesapeake Bayhawks (2010–2020) (Washington Bayhawks 2007–2009) (Baltimore Bayhawks 2001–2006)	Homewood Field	2003	8,500	1906	Baltimore, Maryland
Chesapeake Bayhawks (2010–2020) (Washington Bayhawks 2007–2009) (Baltimore Bayhawks 2001–2006)	Ravens Stadium	2002	70,107	1998	Baltimore, Maryland
Chesapeake Bayhawks (2010–2020) (Washington Bayhawks 2007–2009) (Baltimore Bayhawks 2001–2006)	Homewood Field	2001	8,500	1906	Baltimore, Maryland
Chicago Machine (2006–2010)	Columbus Crew Stadium	2010	20,455	1999	Columbus, Ohio
Chicago Machine (2006–2010)	Marina Auto Stadium	2010	13,768	2006	Rochester, New York
Chicago Machine (2006–2010)	Virginia Beach Sportsplex	2010	10,780	1999	Virginia Beach, Virginia
Chicago Machine (2006–2010)	John Fallon Field	2010	2,800	2005	Albany, New York
Chicago Machine (2006–2010)	Joe Walton Stadium	2010	3,000	2005	Moon Township, Pennsylvania
Chicago Machine (2006–2010)	WakeMed Soccer Park	2010	10,000	2002	Cary, North Carolina
Chicago Machine (2006–2010)	Soldier Field	2009	62,500	1924	Chicago
Chicago Machine (2006–2010)	Toyota Park	2007–2009	20,000	2006	Bridgeview, Illinois
Chicago Machine (2006–2010)	Sports Complex at Benedictine University	2006	3,000	2004	Lisle, Illinois
Connecticut Hammerheads (2020)	Rafferty Stadium	2020	3,500	2015	Fairfield, Connecticut
Dallas Rattlers (2018–2019) (Inactive 2009–10) (Rochester Rattlers 2001–2008, 2011–2017)	Ford Center at The Star	2018–2019	12,000	2015	Frisco, Texas
Dallas Rattlers (2018–2019) (Inactive 2009–10) (Rochester Rattlers 2001–2008, 2011–2017)	Capelli Sport Stadium	2017	13,768	2006	Rochester, New York
Dallas Rattlers (2018–2019) (Inactive 2009–10) (Rochester Rattlers 2001–2008, 2011–2017)	Wegmans Sports Complex	2016	5,000	2005	Rochester, New York
Dallas Rattlers (2018–2019) (Inactive 2009–10) (Rochester Rattlers 2001–2008, 2011–2017)	Eunice Kennedy Shriver Stadium	2015	11,000	1979	Brockport, New York
Dallas Rattlers (2018–2019) (Inactive 2009–10) (Rochester Rattlers 2001–2008, 2011–2017)	Sahlen's Stadium	2011–2014	13,768	2006	Rochester, New York
Dallas Rattlers (2018–2019) (Inactive 2009–10) (Rochester Rattlers 2001–2008, 2011–2017)	PAETEC Park	2006–2008	13,768	2006	Rochester, New York
Dallas Rattlers (2018–2019) (Inactive 2009–10) (Rochester Rattlers 2001–2008, 2011–2017)	Bishop Kearney Field	2003–2005	4,500	1962	Irondequoit, New York
Dallas Rattlers (2018–2019) (Inactive 2009–10) (Rochester Rattlers 2001–2008, 2011–2017)	Frontier Field	2001–2002	10,840	1996	Rochester, New York
Denver Outlaws (2006–2020)	Peter Barton Lacrosse Stadium	2020	2,000	2005	Denver, Colorado
Denver Outlaws (2006–2020)	Empower Field at Mile High	2006–2020	76,125	2001	Denver, Colorado
Florida Launch (2014–2018)	FAU Stadium	2014–2018	29,419	2010	Boca Raton, Florida
Hamilton Nationals (2011–2013) (Toronto Nationals 2009–2010)	Ron Joyce Stadium	2011–2013	6,000	2008	Hamilton, Ontario
Hamilton Nationals (2011–2013) (Toronto Nationals 2009–2010)	Lamport Stadium	2010	9,600	1975	Toronto, Ontario
Hamilton Nationals (2011–2013) (Toronto Nationals 2009–2010)	BMO Field	2009	1,978	2007	Toronto, Ontario
Los Angeles Riptide (2006–2008)	Home Depot Center	2006–2008	10,000	2003	Carson, California
Los Angeles Riptide (2006–2008)	LeBard Stadium	2008	7,600	1955	Costa Mesa, California
New Jersey Pride (2001–2008)	Yurcak Field	2006–2008	5,000	1994	Piscataway, New Jersey
New Jersey Pride (2001–2008)	Alumni Stadium (Kean University)	2005	2,700	1998	Union County, New Jersey
New Jersey Pride (2001–2008)	Mercer County Park	2004–2006	6,103	1971	West Windsor, New Jersey
New Jersey Pride (2001–2008)	Sprague Field	2004–2005	6,000	1962	Montclair, New Jersey
New Jersey Pride (2001–2008)	Commerce Bank Ballpark	2002–2003	6,100	1999	Bridgewater, New Jersey
New Jersey Pride (2001–2008)	Yogi Berra Stadium	2001	3,784	1998	Little Falls, New Jersey
New York Lizards (2013–2020) (Long Island Lizards 2001–2012)	James M. Shuart Stadium	2009–2020	11,929	1962	Hempstead, New York
New York Lizards (2013–2020) (Long Island Lizards 2001–2012)	Mitchel Athletic Complex	2003–2008	2,969	1984	Uniondale, New York
New York Lizards (2013–2020) (Long Island Lizards 2001–2012)	Hofstra Stadium	2001–2002	11,929	1962	Hempstead, New York
New York Lizards (2013–2020) (Long Island Lizards 2001–2012)	Suffolk County Sports Park	2001	6,002	2000	Central Islip, New York
Ohio Machine (2012–2018)	Fortress Obetz	2017–2018	6,500	2017	Obetz, Ohio
Ohio Machine (2012–2018)	Panther Stadium	2016	3,000		Columbus, Ohio
Ohio Machine (2012–2018)	Selby Field	2012–2015	9,100	1929	Delaware, Ohio
Philadelphia Barrage (2004–2008, 2020) (Inactive 2009-2019) (Bridgeport Barrage 2001–2003)	Hillsboro Stadium	2008	7,600	1999	Hillsboro, Oregon
Philadelphia Barrage (2004–2008, 2020) (Inactive 2009-2019) (Bridgeport Barrage 2001–2003)	WakeMed Soccer Park	2008	7,130	2002	Cary, North Carolina
Philadelphia Barrage (2004–2008, 2020) (Inactive 2009-2019) (Bridgeport Barrage 2001–2003)	Anheuser-Busch Center	2008	6,000	1982	St Louis, Missouri
Philadelphia Barrage (2004–2008, 2020) (Inactive 2009-2019) (Bridgeport Barrage 2001–2003)	Texas Stadium	2008	65,675	1971	Irving, Texas
Philadelphia Barrage (2004–2008, 2020) (Inactive 2009-2019) (Bridgeport Barrage 2001–2003)	Virginia Beach Sportsplex	2008	10,780	1999	Virginia Beach, Virginia
Philadelphia Barrage (2004–2008, 2020) (Inactive 2009-2019) (Bridgeport Barrage 2001–2003)	Yurcak Field	2007	5,000	1994	Piscataway, New Jersey
Philadelphia Barrage (2004–2008, 2020) (Inactive 2009-2019) (Bridgeport Barrage 2001–2003)	United Sports Training Center	2007	1,200	1999	Downingtown, Pennsylvania
Philadelphia Barrage (2004–2008, 2020) (Inactive 2009-2019) (Bridgeport Barrage 2001–2003)	Franklin Field	2006	52,593	1895	Philadelphia, Pennsylvania
Philadelphia Barrage (2004–2008, 2020) (Inactive 2009-2019) (Bridgeport Barrage 2001–2003)	Villanova Stadium	2004–2006	12,500	1927	Villanova, Pennsylvania
Philadelphia Barrage (2004–2008, 2020) (Inactive 2009-2019) (Bridgeport Barrage 2001–2003)	Dunning Field	2002	3,200	1997	New Canaan, Connecticut
Philadelphia Barrage (2004–2008, 2020) (Inactive 2009-2019) (Bridgeport Barrage 2001–2003)	The Ballpark at Harbor Yard	2001–2003	5,300	1998	Bridgeport, Connecticut
San Francisco Dragons (2006–2008)	Spartan Stadium	2008	30,578	1933	San Jose, California
San Francisco Dragons (2006–2008)	Kezar Stadium	2006–2007	9,044	1990	San Francisco, California

== See also ==
- List of current Major League Baseball stadiums
- List of current National Football League stadiums
- List of Major League Soccer stadiums
- List of National Basketball Association arenas
- List of National Hockey League arenas
