= 2003 Bridgeport Barrage season =

Season of professional lacrosse

- Head coach: Sal LoCascio
- Home stadium: The Ballpark at Harbor Yard

Results
- Record: 1–11
- Division place: 3rd American Division
- Playoffs: failed to qualify

The Bridgeport Barrage played their third season, as a charter member of the MLL, during the 2003 season of Major League Lacrosse. The 2003 season was the team's last season in Bridgeport, Connecticut before relocating to the Philadelphia suburb of Villanova for the 2004 season. The Barrage ended up in 3rd place in the American Division with a record of 1–11. The Barrage failed to qualify for the 2003 season MLL playoffs.

== Schedule ==
Date	Opponent	Home/Away	Field	Result
May 31	Rattlers	Away	Bishop Kearney Field	L 13–23
June 6	Cannons	Home	The Ballpark at Harbor Yard	L 17–23
June 12	Bayhawks	Home	The Ballpark at Harbor Yard	L 14–21
June 14	Pride	Away	Commerce Bank Ballpark	L 9–16
June 27	Lizards	Away	Mitchel Athletic Complex	L 19–23
July 12	Lizards	Home	The Ballpark at Harbor Yard	L 16–17
July 19	Bayhawks	Away	Homewood Field	W 22–17
July 24	Rattlers	Home	The Ballpark at Harbor Yard	L 19–21
July 31	Pride	Home	The Ballpark at Harbor Yard	L 14–22
August 2	Rattlers	Away	Bishop Kearney Field	L 13–28
August 7	Cannons	Away	Cawley Memorial Stadium	L 15–21
August 14	Rattlers	Home	The Ballpark at Harbor Yard	L 18–23
