= 2007 Philadelphia Barrage season =

Season of an American lacrosse team

- Head coach: Tony Resch
- Home stadium: United Sports Training Center

Results
- Record: 9–3
- Division place: 1st Eastern Conference
- Playoffs: Won MLL Championship over Los Angeles Riptide 16–13

The Philadelphia Barrage played their seventh season, as a charter member of the MLL (originally known as the Bridgeport Barrage), during the 2007 season of Major League Lacrosse. The Barrage won their second Eastern Conference Championship during the regular season with a 1st place record of 9–3. The Barrage qualified for the MLL Playoffs for the third time in franchise history. The Barrage defeated the Outlaws 13–12 in OT in the MLL Semifinals at PAETEC Park on August 25, 2007. The Barrage won their third MLL Championship by defeating the Riptide 16–13 in the MLL Championship Game at PAETEC Park on August 26, 2007.

== Schedule ==
| Date | Opponent | Home/Away | Field | Result |
|---|---|---|---|---|
| May 19 | Cannons | Away | Harvard Stadium | W 13–9 |
| June 2 | Rattlers | Home | United Sports Training Center | W 21–17 |
| June 9 | Cannons | Home | United Sports Training Center | W 16–13 |
| June 16 | Lizards | Away | Mitchel Athletic Complex | L 11–16 |
| June 23 | Rattlers | Away | PAETEC Park | L 11–16 |
| June 30 | Lizards | Home | United Sports Training Center | W 14–13 OT |
| July 6 | Dragons | Home | United Sports Training Center | W 14–9 |
| July 12 | Pride | Away | Yurcak Field | W 12–7 |
| July 21 | Outlaws | Away | INVESCO Field | L 13–15 |
| July 26 | Pride | Home | Yurcak Field | W 12–11 OT |
| August 4 | Bayhawks | Away | Multi-Sport Field | W 21–11 |
| August 11 | Bayhawks | Home | United Sports Training Center | W 22–7 |

== Playoffs ==
| Date | Round | Opponent | Field | Result |
|---|---|---|---|---|
| August 25 | MLL Semifinals | Outlaws | PAETEC Park | W 13–12 OT |
| August 26 | MLL Championship Game | Riptide | PAETEC Park | W 16–13 |
