= 2006 Philadelphia Barrage season =

Season of an American lacrosse team

- Head coach: Tony Resch
- Home stadium: Villanova Stadium

Results
- Record: 10–2
- Division place: 1st Eastern Conference
- Playoffs: Won MLL Championship over Denver Outlaws 23–12

The Philadelphia Barrage played their sixth season, as a charter member of the MLL (originally known as the Bridgeport Barrage), during the 2006 season of Major League Lacrosse (MLL). The Barrage won their 1st Eastern Conference Championship during the regular season with a 1st place record of 10–2. The Barrage qualified for the MLL Playoffs for the second time in franchise history. The Barrage defeated the Cannons 17–12 in the MLL Semifinals at The Home Depot Center on August 25, 2006.

The Barrage won the MLL Championship by defeating the Outlaws 23–12 in the MLL Championship Game at The Home Depot Center on August 27, 2006. It was their second title in three years.

== Schedule ==
Date	Opponent	Home/Away	Field	Result
May 20	Rattlers	Home	Franklin Field	W 12–11
May 27	Riptide	Home	Villanova Stadium	W 18–6
June 3	Pride	Home	Villanova Stadium	W 16–15
June 10	Machine	Away	Sports Complex at Benedictine University	W 13–12 OT
June 17	Lizards	Away	Mitchel Athletic Complex	W 13–12
June 24	Cannons	Away	Nickerson Field	L 15–16
June 29	Cannons	Home	Villanova Stadium	L 5–16
July 8	Pride	Away	Mercer County Park	W 17–7
July 20	Lizards	Home	Villanova Stadium	W 10–8
July 27	Bayhawks	Home	Villanova Stadium	W 22–11
August 5	Rattlers	Away	PAETEC Park	W 18–13
August 12	Bayhawks	Away	Johnny Unitas Stadium	W 20–12

== Playoffs ==
Date	Round	Opponent	Field	Result
August 25	MLL Semifinals	Cannons	The Home Depot Center	W 17–12
August 27	MLL Championship Game	Outlaws	The Home Depot Center	W 23–12
