= 2001 Bridgeport Barrage season =

- Head coach: Ted Garber
- Home stadium: The Ballpark at Harbor Yard

Results
- Record: 3–11
- Division place: 3rd American Division
- Playoffs: failed to qualify

The Bridgeport Barrage played their first season, as a charter member of the Major League Lacrosse (MLL), during the 2001 MLL season. The Barrage ended up in 3rd place in the American Division with a record of 3–11. The Barrage failed to qualify for the MLL playoffs.

== Schedule ==
Date	Opponent	Home/Away	Field	Result
June 15	Cannons	Home	The Ballpark at Harbor Yard	L 13–19
June 17	Bayhawks	Home	The Ballpark at Harbor Yard	W 12–9
June 23	Rattlers	Away	Frontier Field	L 14–19
June 29	Lizards	Home	The Ballpark at Harbor Yard	L 16–17
June 30	Pride	Away	Yogi Berra Stadium	L 10–17
July 6	Rattlers	Home	The Ballpark at Harbor Yard	L 10–14
July 12	Lizards	Away	EAB Park	W 13–12
July 14	Cannons	Away	Cawley Memorial Stadium	L 15–17
July 19	Pride	Home	The Ballpark at Harbor Yard	L 14–15
July 27	Bayhawks	Away	Homewood Field	L 11–12 OT
August 5	Lizards	Away	Hofstra Stadium	L 14–17
August 11	Lizards	Home	The Ballpark at Harbor Yard	L 17–18
August 19	Cannons	Home	The Ballpark at Harbor Yard	W 17–15
August 25	Cannons	Away	Cawley Memorial Stadium	L 14–15 OT
