= 2002 Bridgeport Barrage season =

- Head coach: Sal LoCascio
- Home stadium: The Ballpark at Harbor Yard

Results
- Record: 3–11
- Division place: 3rd American Division
- Playoffs: failed to qualify

The Bridgeport Barrage played their second season, as a charter member of the Major League Lacrosse (MLL) during the 2002 MLL season. The Barrage ended up in 3rd place in the American Division with a record of 3–11. The Barrage failed to qualify for the MLL playoffs.

== Schedule ==
Date	Opponent	Home/Away	Field	Result
June 2	Lizards	Away	Hofstra Stadium	L 8–21
June 7	Pride	Away	Commerce Bank Ballpark	L 7–12
June 15	Cannons	Home	The Ballpark at Harbor Yard	L 18–19 OT
June 21	Bayhawks	Home	Dunning Field	L 7–15
June 22	Bayhawks	Away	Ravens Stadium	W 15–12
June 28	Lizards	Home	The Ballpark at Harbor Yard	L 20–21 OT
July 6	Pride	Home	The Ballpark at Harbor Yard	L 16–17 OT
July 12	Rattlers	Away	Frontier Field	L 5–15
July 18	Cannons	Away	Cawley Memorial Stadium	L 13–22
July 25	Rattlers	Home	The Ballpark at Harbor Yard	L 12–16
July 27	Cannons	Away	Cawley Memorial Stadium	W 19–17
July 31	Lizards	Home	The Ballpark at Harbor Yard	W 15–13
August 9	Cannons	Home	The Ballpark at Harbor Yard	L 15–17
August 17	Lizards	Away	Hofstra Stadium	L 11–18
