= Rust Belt Derby =

American soccer derby

- Sport: Soccer
- Location: Rust Belt
- Teams: Cleveland SC; Detroit City FC; FC Buffalo; AFC Cleveland (defunct)
- First meeting: 2012
- Latest meeting: 2021

Statistics
- Total meetings: 7
- Most wins: Detroit City (6 titles)
- All-time record: Cleveland SC: 1 win; Detroit City: 12 wins; FC Buffalo: 4 wins; AFC Cleveland: 4 wins; 8 ties

The Rust Belt Derby was a soccer derby played between Detroit City FC, FC Buffalo, and AFC Cleveland in the National Premier Soccer League, the fourth tier of American soccer. The derby was named for the Rust Belt region of the United States. The RBD was created and sponsored by the supporter groups of the three clubs: The Situation Room (Buffalo), 6th City Syndicate (Cleveland), and the Northern Guard Supporters (Detroit).

The series was based on the results of games played between the three sides, much like the Cascadia Cup. Cleveland won the inaugural Rust Belt Derby on June 23, 2012 following a 1–1 draw with Detroit City.

AFC Cleveland folded following the 2017 season, and although Detroit City had been moved to a neighboring conference they continued the derby with a home-and-away series of friendlies against Buffalo, which saw Detroit win the trophy for the fourth consecutive time. Between 2017 and 2019, the derby was dormant, though it was functionally revived for the 2020 NISA Independent Cup when it was announced that Detroit City, FC Buffalo, and Cleveland SC would be competing together in the Great Lakes Division.

== Results ==
Year	Winner	Win number	Runner-up
2012	AFC Cleveland	1	Detroit City FC
2013	Detroit City FC	1	FC Buffalo
2014	Detroit City FC	2	FC Buffalo
2015	Detroit City FC	3	FC Buffalo
2016	Detroit City FC	4	FC Buffalo
2020	Detroit City FC	5	Cleveland SC
2021	Detroit City FC	6	FC Buffalo

=== NPSL era (2012–2016) ===
2012 Rust Belt Derby standings

Place	Team	Pld	W	T	L	GF	GA	GD	Points
1	AFC Cleveland	6	3	3	0	14	8	+6	12
2	Detroit City FC	6	2	3	1	11	5	+6	9
3	FC Buffalo	6	0	2	4	4	16	−12	2

2013 Rust Belt Derby standings

Place	Team	Pld	W	T	L	GF	GA	GD	Points
1	Detroit City FC	4	3	1	0	9	3	+6	10
2	FC Buffalo	4	2	0	2	5	6	−1	6
3	AFC Cleveland	4	0	1	3	5	10	−5	1

2014 Rust Belt Derby standings

Place	Team	Pld	W	T	L	GF	GA	GD	Points
1	Detroit City FC	2	1	0	1	6	4	+2	3
2	FC Buffalo	2	1	0	1	4	3	+1	3
3	AFC Cleveland	2	1	0	1	3	6	−3	3

2015 Rust Belt Derby standings

Place	Team	Pld	W	T	L	GF	GA	GD	Points
1	Detroit City FC	2	1	1	0	4	3	+1	4
2	FC Buffalo	2	0	2	0	2	2	0	2
3	AFC Cleveland	2	0	1	1	3	4	−1	1

2016 Rust Belt Derby standings

Place	Team	Pld	W	T	L	GF	GA	GD	Points
1	Detroit City FC	2	1	1	0	2	1	+1	4
2	FC Buffalo	2	0	1	1	1	2	−1	1

=== NISA era (2020–2021) ===
2020 NISA Independent Cup — Great Lakes

Pos	Team	Pld	W	PW	PL	L	GF	GA	GD	Pts
1	Detroit City FC (C)	2	2	0	0	0	6	0	+6	6
2	Cleveland SC	2	1	0	0	1	3	4	−1	3
3	FC Buffalo	2	0	0	0	2	1	6	−5	0

Source: nisaofficial.com
Rules for classification: 1) points; 2) head to head; 3) goal differential.
(C) Champion

2021 NISA Independent Cup — Great Lakes

Note: Livonia City FC were not eligible to win the Rust Belt Derby and could only claim the Great Lakes Region of the NISA Independent Cup

Pos	Team	Pld	W	D	L	GF	GA	GD	Pts
1	Detroit City FC (C)	3	3	0	0	17	2	+15	9
2	FC Buffalo	3	2	0	1	11	3	+8	6
3	Cleveland SC	3	0	1	2	3	13	−10	1
4	Livonia City FC	3	0	1	2	2	15	−13	1

Source: nisaofficial.com
Rules for classification: 1) points; 2) goal differential; 3) goals for; 4) head-to-head
(C) Champions
