= Neeskens =

Neeskens is both a given name and surname. Notable people with the name include:

- Johan Neeskens (1951–2024), Dutch football manager and player
- John Neeskens (born 1993), American soccer player
- Neeskens Kebano (born 1992), French-born Congolese footballer
