= 2015 NPSL season =

National Premier Soccer League
- Season: 2015
- Champions: New York Cosmos B (1st Title)
- Regular Season Champions: New York Cosmos B
- Matches: 391
- Goals: 1,442 (3.69 per match)
- Best Player: (Spain) Jon Ander Ibarrondo (Myrtle Beach Mutiny)
- Top goalscorer: (Portugal) Miguel Herlein (New York Cosmos B) (England) Simon Rawnsley (Aguiluchos USA) (16 Goals Each)
- Best goalkeeper: (England) Gregory Hartley (Chattanooga FC)
- Biggest home win: NYC 9–0 RIR (July 5)
- Biggest away win: TEM 1–8 SDF (June 7)
- Highest scoring: TUL 10–2 LIV (June 27)
- Highest attendance: 18,227 CHA 2-3 NYC (August 8 - NPSL record) (NPSL Championship Game)

The 2015 NPSL season was the 103rd season of FIFA-sanctioned soccer in the United States, and the 13th season of the National Premier Soccer League. Sixty eight clubs competed in the semi-professional soccer leagues.

== Changes from 2014 ==
=== New teams ===
Team	Location	Region/Conference	Notes
Deportivo Coras USA	Riverside, California	West - Southwest	Expansion
FC Frederick	Frederick, Maryland	Northeast - Mid-Atlantic	Expansion
FC Indiana Lions	Lafayette, Indiana	Midwest	Returning team
FC Tacoma 253	Tacoma, Washington	West - Northwest	Expansion
FC Wichita	Wichita, Kansas	South - South Central	Expansion
Fredericksburg FC	Fredericksburg, Virginia	Northeast - Mid-Atlantic	Rebrand of RVA FC
Houston Regals	Houston, Texas	South - South Central	Returning team
Kraze United	Lake Mary, Florida	South - Sunshine	Expansion
Jersey Blues FC	Morris Plains, New Jersey	Northeast - Keystone	Returning team, Rebrand from Morris County Colonials
New York Cosmos B	New York, New York	Northeast - North Atlantic	Expansion
Weston FC	Weston, Florida	South - Sunshine	Expansion
Miami Fusion FC	Miami, Florida	South - Sunshine	Expansion

=== Withdrew / On Hiatus ===
Locations of NPSL clubs for 2015. Blue = Northeast Region clubs, Yellow = South Region clubs, Green = Midwest Region clubs, Red = West Region clubs

Team	Reason
BCS Clash	Temporary withdraw
Bordo FC St. Louis	Folded
Cape Coral Hurricanes	Joined CSL USA
D.C. United U-23	Joined USL-PDL
Del Rey City SC	Joined United Premier Soccer League
Eau Claire Aris FC	On hiatus; plans to move to Milwaukee
FC Santa Clarita	Joined United Premier Soccer League
Federal City FC	Temporary withdraw
Gate City FC	Folded
Gorge FC	Folded
Inter United FC	Folded
Junior Lone Star FC	Temporary withdraw
Lehigh Valley United Sonic	Joined USL-PDL
New York Red Bulls U-23	Joined USL-PDL
Oklahoma City FC	Withdrew; planned to join NASL
Pensacola FC	Withdrew during 2014 season
Pocono Snow	On hiatus
Quad City Eagles FC	Temporary withdraw
Rocket City United	Temporary withdraw
Seattle Sporting FC	Withdrew; joined PASL
Tampa Marauders	Joined CSL USA

== Standings ==
=== Northeast Region ===
==== Mid Atlantic Conference ====
Pos	Team	Pld	W	L	T	GF	GA	GD	Pts	Qualification
1	Fredericksburg FC (C)	10	6	1	3	21	7	+14	21	2015 NPSL Northeast Region playoffs
2	Chesterfield United FC	10	5	2	3	23	18	+5	18	2015 NPSL Northeast Region playoffs
3	Virginia Beach City FC	10	5	2	3	20	11	+9	18	
4	FC Frederick	10	4	2	4	21	20	+1	16	
5	Legacy 76	10	1	7	2	9	28	−19	5	
6	ASA Charge	10	1	8	1	16	26	−10	4	

Updated to match(es) played on July 12, 2015. Source: NPSL standings
Rules for classification: 1) points; 2) head-to-head; 3) goal differential in head-to-head results; 4) wins; 5) total goal differential; 6) fewest losses; 7) coin toss
(C) Champions

==== North Atlantic Conference ====
Pos	Team	Pld	W	L	T	GF	GA	GD	Pts	Qualification
1	New York Cosmos B (C)	12	11	0	1	49	7	+42	34	2015 NPSL Northeast Region playoffs
2	New York Athletic Club	12	7	3	2	27	10	+17	23	2015 NPSL Northeast Region playoffs
3	Seacoast United Phantoms	12	6	3	3	26	17	+9	21	
4	Brooklyn Italians	12	6	5	1	22	20	+2	19	
5	Seacoast United Mariners	12	2	5	5	14	27	−13	11	
6	RI Reds	12	3	8	1	12	44	−32	10	
7	Greater Lowell United FC	12	0	11	1	5	30	−25	1	

Updated to match(es) played on July 12, 2015. Source: NPSL standings
Rules for classification: 1) points; 2) head-to-head; 3) goal differential in head-to-head results; 4) wins; 5) total goal differential; 6) fewest losses; 7) coin toss
(C) Champions

==== Keystone Conference ====
Pos	Team	Pld	W	L	T	GF	GA	GD	Pts	Qualification
1	Clarkstown SC Eagles (C)	10	7	2	1	24	5	+19	22	2015 NPSL Northeast Region playoffs
2	GBFC Thunder	10	4	2	4	24	19	+5	16	2015 NPSL Northeast Region playoffs
3	Buxmont Torch FC	10	5	4	1	18	16	+2	16	
4	Hershey FC	10	4	3	3	16	16	0	15	
5	Electric City Shock SC	10	2	6	2	13	21	−8	8	
6	Jersey Blues FC	10	2	7	1	15	33	−18	7	

Updated to match(es) played on July 12, 2015. Source: NPSL standings
Rules for classification: 1) points; 2) head-to-head; 3) goal differential in head-to-head results; 4) wins; 5) total goal differential; 6) fewest losses; 7) coin toss
(C) Champions

=== South Region ===
==== South Atlantic Conference ====
Pos	Team	Pld	W	L	T	GF	GA	GD	Pts	Qualification
1	Myrtle Beach Mutiny (C)	12	10	1	1	28	16	+12	31	2015 NPSL South Region playoffs
2	FC Carolina Discoveries	12	4	4	4	24	22	+2	16	
3	Carolina RailHawks U-23's	12	3	6	3	21	26	−5	12	
4	Upward Stars FC	12	1	7	4	18	27	−9	7	

Updated to match(es) played on July 12, 2015. Source: NPSL standings
Rules for classification: 1) points; 2) head-to-head; 3) goal differential in head-to-head results; 4) wins; 5) total goal differential; 6) fewest losses; 7) coin toss
(C) Champions

==== South Central Conference ====
Pos	Team	Pld	W	L	T	GF	GA	GD	Pts	Qualification
1	FC Wichita (C)	14	11	3	0	35	11	+24	33	2015 NPSL South Region playoffs
2	Corinthians FC of San Antonio	14	10	3	1	41	19	+22	31	
3	Tulsa Athletics	14	7	4	3	52	33	+19	24	
4	Dallas City FC	14	5	6	3	23	23	0	18	
5	Joplin Demize	14	4	7	3	15	27	−12	15	
6	Fort Worth Vaqueros FC	14	3	6	5	21	35	−14	14	
7	Houston Regals	14	3	8	3	13	28	−15	12	
8	Liverpool Warriors	14	3	9	2	19	43	−24	11	

Updated to match(es) played on July 12, 2015. Source: NPSL standings
Rules for classification: 1) points; 2) head-to-head; 3) goal differential in head-to-head results; 4) wins; 5) total goal differential; 6) fewest losses; 7) coin toss
(C) Champions

==== Southeast Conference ====
Pos	Team	Pld	W	L	T	GF	GA	GD	Pts	Qualification
1	Chattanooga FC (C)	10	8	1	1	28	6	+22	25	2015 NPSL Southeast Conference playoffs
2	Atlanta Silverbacks Reserves	10	8	2	0	17	7	+10	24	2015 NPSL Southeast Conference playoffs
3	Georgia Revolution	10	4	4	2	19	26	−7	14	2015 NPSL Southeast Conference playoffs
4	Nashville FC	10	4	5	1	18	15	+3	13	2015 NPSL Southeast Conference playoffs
5	New Orleans Jesters	10	1	6	3	9	22	−13	6	
6	Knoxville Force	10	0	7	3	14	29	−15	3	

Updated to match(es) played on July 4, 2015. Source: NPSL standings
Rules for classification: 1) points; 2) head-to-head; 3) goal differential in head-to-head results; 4) wins; 5) total goal differential; 6) fewest losses; 7) coin toss
(C) Champions

==== Sunshine Conference ====
Pos	Team	Pld	W	L	T	GF	GA	GD	Pts	Qualification
1	Miami Fusion FC (C)	10	8	1	1	25	15	+10	25	2015 NPSL South Region playoffs
2	Miami United FC	10	6	4	0	23	16	+7	18	
3	Kraze United	10	6	4	0	21	17	+4	18	
4	Jacksonville United	10	3	5	2	10	14	−4	11	
5	Weston FC	10	3	6	1	10	16	−6	10	
6	Storm FC	10	1	7	2	8	19	−11	5	

Updated to match(es) played on July 12, 2015. Source: NPSL standings
Rules for classification: 1) points; 2) head-to-head; 3) goal differential in head-to-head results; 4) wins; 5) total goal differential; 6) fewest losses; 7) coin toss
(C) Champions

=== Midwest Region ===
Pos	Team	Pld	W	L	T	GF	GA	GD	Pts	Qualification
1	Madison 56ers (C)	12	9	2	1	30	19	+11	28	2015 NPSL Midwest Region playoffs
2	Detroit City FC	12	8	2	2	30	14	+16	26	2015 NPSL Midwest Region playoffs
3	AFC Cleveland	12	8	2	2	30	10	+20	26	2015 NPSL Midwest Region playoffs
4	Indiana Fire	12	7	2	3	22	10	+12	24	2015 NPSL Midwest Region playoffs
5	FC Buffalo	12	6	2	4	24	16	+8	22	
6	Lansing United	12	6	4	2	16	14	+2	20	
7	Erie Commodores FC	12	5	7	0	24	27	−3	15	
8	Minnesota United FC Reserves	12	4	6	2	18	25	−7	14	
9	Michigan Stars FC	12	4	7	1	17	21	−4	13	
10	Cincinnati Saints	12	4	7	1	14	21	−7	13	
11	FC Indiana Lions	12	2	7	3	15	32	−17	9	
12	Fort Pitt FC Regiment	12	2	8	2	12	26	−14	8	
13	Minnesota Twin Stars	12	1	10	1	13	30	−17	4	

Updated to match(es) played on July 22, 2015. Source: NPSL standings
Rules for classification: 1) points; 2) head-to-head; 3) goal differential in head-to-head results; 4) wins; 5) total goal differential; 6) fewest losses; 7) coin toss
(C) Champions

=== West Region ===
==== Golden Gates Conference ====
Pos	Team	Pld	W	L	T	GF	GA	GD	Pts	Qualification
1	Sonoma County Sol (C)	12	10	2	0	39	19	+20	30	2015 NPSL West Region playoffs
2	Sacramento Gold	12	7	3	2	28	19	+9	23	2015 NPSL West Region playoffs
3	CD Aguiluchos USA	12	7	4	1	28	18	+10	22	2015 NPSL West Region playoffs
4	Real San Jose	12	5	6	1	24	32	−8	16	
5	San Francisco Stompers FC	12	3	9	0	20	34	−14	9	

Updated to match(es) played on June 28, 2015. Source: NPSL standings
Rules for classification: 1) points; 2) head-to-head; 3) goal differential in head-to-head results; 4) wins; 5) total goal differential; 6) fewest losses; 7) coin toss
(C) Champions

==== Northwest Conference ====
Pos	Team	Pld	W	L	T	GF	GA	GD	Pts	Qualification
1	FC Tacoma 253 (C)	12	4	7	1	23	25	−2	13	2015 NPSL West Region playoffs
2	Spartans Futbol Club	12	3	8	1	18	33	−15	10	

Updated to match(es) played on June 28, 2015. Source: NPSL standings
Rules for classification: 1) points; 2) head-to-head; 3) goal differential in head-to-head results; 4) wins; 5) total goal differential; 6) fewest losses; 7) coin toss
(C) Champions

==== Southwest Conference ====
Pos	Team	Pld	W	L	T	GF	GA	GD	Pts	Qualification
1	San Diego Flash (C)	12	9	1	2	35	14	+21	29	2015 NPSL West Region playoffs
2	Deportivo Coras USA	12	8	2	2	29	14	+15	26	2015 NPSL West Region playoffs
3	FC Force	12	3	5	4	20	23	−3	13	
4	FC Hasental	12	3	6	3	15	18	−3	12	
5	Temecula FC	12	1	10	1	14	44	−30	4	

Updated to match(es) played on July 2, 2015. Source: NPSL standings
Rules for classification: 1) points; 2) head-to-head; 3) goal differential in head-to-head results; 4) wins; 5) total goal differential; 6) fewest losses; 7) coin toss
(C) Champions

== Playoffs ==
=== Southeast Conference Playoffs ===
Semifinal; July 10
**1**	**Chattanooga FC**	**5**
4	Nashville FC	1
**2**	**Atlanta Silverbacks Reserves**	**4**
3	Georgia Revolution	1

Final; July 11
**1**	**Chattanooga FC**	**3**
2	Atlanta Silverbacks Reserves	0

Bold = winner
* = after extra time, ( ) = penalty shootout score

Southeast Conference Playoffs
July 10, 2015
7:00 PM EDT
Semifinals

Atlanta Silverbacks Reserves	4–1	Georgia Revolution
Massiah 1', 34'; Duarte 43'; Rodriguez		Mendoza 88'

Silverbacks Park
Atlanta Georgia
July 10, 2015
7:30 PM EDT
Semifinals

Chattanooga FC	5–1	Nashville FC
Winter 22'; Ferraz 26'; Ochieng 45+3' (pen.); De Smedt 66'; Goñi 90+1'	Report	Dunleavy 25'

Finley Stadium
Chattanooga, Tennessee
Attendance: 3,406

July 11, 2015
7:30 PM EDT
Final

Chattanooga FC	3–0	Atlanta Silverbacks Reserves
Winter 11'; De Smedt 72' (pen.); Davidson 88'	Report

Finley Stadium
Chattanooga, Tennessee
Attendance: 3,358

=== Regional and National Playoffs ===
Regional First round July 11–18
**4**	**New York Athletic Club**	**4**
5	Chesterfield United FC	2
**3**	**Fredericksburg FC**	**1***
6	GBFC Thunder	0
3	Deportivo Coras USA	0
**6**	**CD Aguiluchos USA**	**4**
**4**	**Sacramento Gold**	**3***
5	FC Tacoma 253	2

Regional semifinal July 18–24
**1**	**New York Cosmos B**	–
4	New York Athletic Club	for
**2**	**Clarkstown SC Eagles**	**1**
3	Fredericksburg FC	0
1	Sonoma County Sol	2(7)
**6**	**CD Aguiluchos USA**	**2(8)**
2	San Diego Flash	1
**4**	**Sacramento Gold**	**3**
**1**	**Myrtle Beach Mutiny**	**3**
4	FC Wichita	1
**2**	**Chattanooga FC**	**1**
3	Miami Fusion FC	0
1	Madison 56ers	0
**4**	**Indiana Fire**	**1**
2	Detroit City FC	1
**3**	**AFC Cleveland**	**2**

Regional Final; July 25
**1**	**New York Cosmos B**	**2**
2	Clarkstown SC Eagles	0
**6**	**CD Aguiluchos USA**	**4**
4	Sacramento Gold	3
1	Myrtle Beach Mutiny	2
**2**	**Chattanooga FC**	**3**
**4**	**Indiana Fire**	**3**
3	AFC Cleveland	1

National semifinal August 1
**1**	**New York Cosmos B**	**5**
4	CD Aguiluchos USA	2
**2**	**Chattanooga FC**	**3**
3	Indiana Fire	0

National Final; August 8
**1**	**New York Cosmos B**	**3***
2	Chattanooga FC	2

Note: Teams in national semifinal were reseeded and paired based on those seeds (1 vs. 4, 2 vs. 3).
Bold = winner
* = after extra time, ( ) = penalty shootout score

=== Regional First Round ===
West Region First Round
July 11, 2015
7:00 PM PDT
First Round

Sacramento Gold	3–2 (a.e.t.)	FC Tacoma 253

Capital Christian High School
Sacramento, California
July 12, 2015
7:30 PM PDT
First Round

Deportivo Coras USA	0–4	CD Aguiluchos USA

La Sierra University
Riverside, California
Northeast Region First Round
July 18, 2015
4:00 PM EDT
First Round

New York Athletic Club	4–2	Chesterfield United FC

Travers Island Field
Pelham, New York
July 18, 2015
5:00 PM EDT
First Round

Fredericksburg FC	1–0 (a.e.t.)	GBFC Thunder

UMW Battleground Athletic Complex
Fredericksburg, Virginia

=== Regional Semifinals ===
South Region Semifinals
July 18, 2015
7:30 PM EDT
Semifinals

Myrtle Beach Mutiny	3–1	FC Wichita
Ibarrondo 11', 30', 57'		Hamed 20'

Ashley Booth Field
Myrtle Beach, South Carolina
July 18, 2015
7:30 PM EDT
Semifinals

Chattanooga FC	1–0	Miami Fusion FC
Ferraz 13'	Report	Guirand (red card) 63'

Finley Stadium
Chattanooga, Tennessee
Attendance: 6,143
West Region Semifinals
July 18, 2015
6:30 PM PDT
Semifinals

San Diego Flash	1–3	Sacramento Gold

El Cajon Valley High School
El Cajon, California
July 18, 2015
7:00 PM PDT
Semifinals

Sonoma County Sol	2–2	CD Aguiluchos USA
Penalties
	7–8

Santa Rosa High School
Santa Rosa, California
Northeast Region Semifinals
July 22, 2015
5:00 PM EDT
Semifinals

New York Cosmos B	3–0 Forfeit	New York Athletic Club

Mitchel Athletic Complex
Uniondale, New York
July 22, 2015
6:30 PM EDT
Semifinals

Clarkstown SC Eagles	1–0	Fredericksburg FC
Gomez (yellow card) 48'; Bardic 49'	Report	Sakou (red card) 90+4'

Aviator Field
Brooklyn, New York
Midwest Region Semifinals
July 24, 2015
3:00 PM CDT
Semifinals

Detroit City FC	1–2	AFC Cleveland
MacInnes 76'	Report	Haupt 7'; Potocnik 75'

Breese Stevens Athletic Field
Madison, Wisconsin
July 24, 2015
7:00 PM CDT
Semifinals

Madison 56ers	0–1	Indiana Fire
Boaventura (yellow card) 37'; Martinez (yellow card) 81'; Roelke (yellow card) 84'	Report 1Report 2	Kim (yellow card) 45+1'; Mbengue 48' (yellow card) 81'

Breese Stevens Athletic Field
Madison, Wisconsin

=== Regional Finals ===
Midwest Region Final
July 25, 2015
3:00 PM CDT
Final

AFC Cleveland	1–3	Indiana Fire
(o.g.)		Mitchell; Klett; Griffith 69' (pen.)

Breese Stevens Athletic Field
Madison, Wisconsin
Northeast Region Final
July 25, 2015
5:00 PM EDT
Final

New York Cosmos B	2–0	Clarkstown SC Eagles
Herlein 4', 34'	Report

Mitchel Athletic Complex
Uniondale, New York
South Region Final
July 25, 2015
7:30 PM EDT
Final

Myrtle Beach Mutiny	2–3	Chattanooga FC
Bass 82', 83'	Report	Ochieng 23' (pen.), 77'; De Smedt 56'

Ashley Booth Field
Myrtle Beach, South Carolina
Attendance: 1,000+
West Region Final
July 25, 2015
7:30 PM PDT
Final

Sacramento Gold	3–4	CD Aguiluchos USA
Mititelu 45'; Prado 71'; Piña 84'	Report	Martinez 32', 73'; Morales 39'; Morales 77'

Capital Christian High School
Sacramento, California

=== National Semifinals ===
August 1, 2015
7:30 PM EDT
Semifinals

New York Cosmos B	5–2	CD Aguiluchos USA
Brito 12', 34'; Herlein 49', 72'; Chirishian 69'	Report	Martinez 50'; Dodrill (yellow card) 30' (yellow-red card) 58'; Collins 78'

Hofstra Soccer Stadium
Hempstead, New York
August 1, 2015
7:30 PM EDT
Semifinals

Chattanooga FC	3–0	Indiana Fire
Ochieng 65', 76'; Trude 90'	Report

Finley Stadium
Chattanooga, Tennessee
Attendance: 9,236

=== NPSL Championship Game ===
August 8, 2015
7:30 PM EDT

Chattanooga FC	2–3 (a.e.t.)	New York Cosmos B
Ochieng 68'; Goñi 115'	Report	Diaby 43', 91'; Stahler 105+2'

Finley Stadium
Chattanooga, Tennessee
Attendance: 18,227

== NPSL League Awards ==
Week	NPSL Player of the Week			
Week	Player	Position	Club	Reason
Week 1	(United States) John Connolly	GK	Sacramento Gold	
Week 2	(United States) Danny Martinez	FW	Real San Jose	
Week 3	(United States) Nick Hamilton	DF	San Diego Flash	
Week 4	(England) Simon Rawnsley	FW	CD Aguiluchos USA	
Week 5	(Morocco) Khalid Arramdani	FW	San Francisco Stompers	
Week 6	(United States) Julian Stahler	DF	New York Cosmos B	
Week 7	(United States) Ryan Hurdes	FW	Jersey Blues FC	
Week 8	(England) Aksel Juul	MF	Myrtle Beach FC	
Week 9	(United States) Drew Whalen	FW	Madison 56ers	
Week 10	(Brazil) Mario Pinto	FW	Joplin Demize	
Week 11	(Spain) Samuel Goni	FW	Chattanooga FC	
Week 12	(United States) Matt Clare	MF	FC Wichita	
Week 13	(United States) Alex Ivanov	GK	AFC Cleveland	
Week 14	(Spain) Jon Ibarrondo	FW	Myrtle Beach FC	
Week 15	(England) George Stannard	FW	New York Athletic Club	
Week 16	(United States) Kendell McFayden	DF	FC Buffalo	

1st Team All NPSL
Position	Player	Club
DF	(United States) John Neeskens	New York Cosmos B
DF	(England) Sean Rutter	Chattanooga FC
DF	(United States) Kevin Ten Eyck	FC Wichita
DF	(United States) Kendell McFayden	FC Buffalo
MF	(Liberia) Cyrus Saydee	Detroit City FC
MF	(Spain) Ruben Bover	New York Cosmos B
MF	(United States) Matt Clare	FC Wichita
FW	(England) William Mellors-Blair	Detroit City FC
FW	(United States) Ross Middlemiss	CD Aguiluchos USA
FW	(Spain) Jon Ander Ibarrondo	Myrtle Beach FC
GK	(England) Gregory Hartley	Chattanooga FC

2nd Team All NPSL
Position	Player	Club
DF	(United States) Taylor Varnadore	Sonoma County Sol
DF	(United States) Zach Schewee	Detroit City FC
DF	(Nigeria) Prince Bere	San Francisco Stompers
DF	(Haiti) Elusma Pierre	Miami Fusion FC
MF	(Bosnia and Herzegovina) Admir Suljevic	AFC Cleveland
MF	(France) Leo De Smedt	Chattanooga FC
MF	(United States) Chris Daly	Sonoma County Sol
FW	(Brazil) Mario Pinto	Joplin Demize
FW	(Senegal) Nago Mbengue	Indiana Fire
FW	(Portugal) Miguel Herlein	New York Cosmos B
GK	(United States) John Connolly	Sacramento Gold

NPSL Golden Ball
Position	Player	Club
FW	(Spain) Jon Ander Ibarrondo	Myrtle Beach FC
