= Dwight Freeney =

American football player (born 1980)

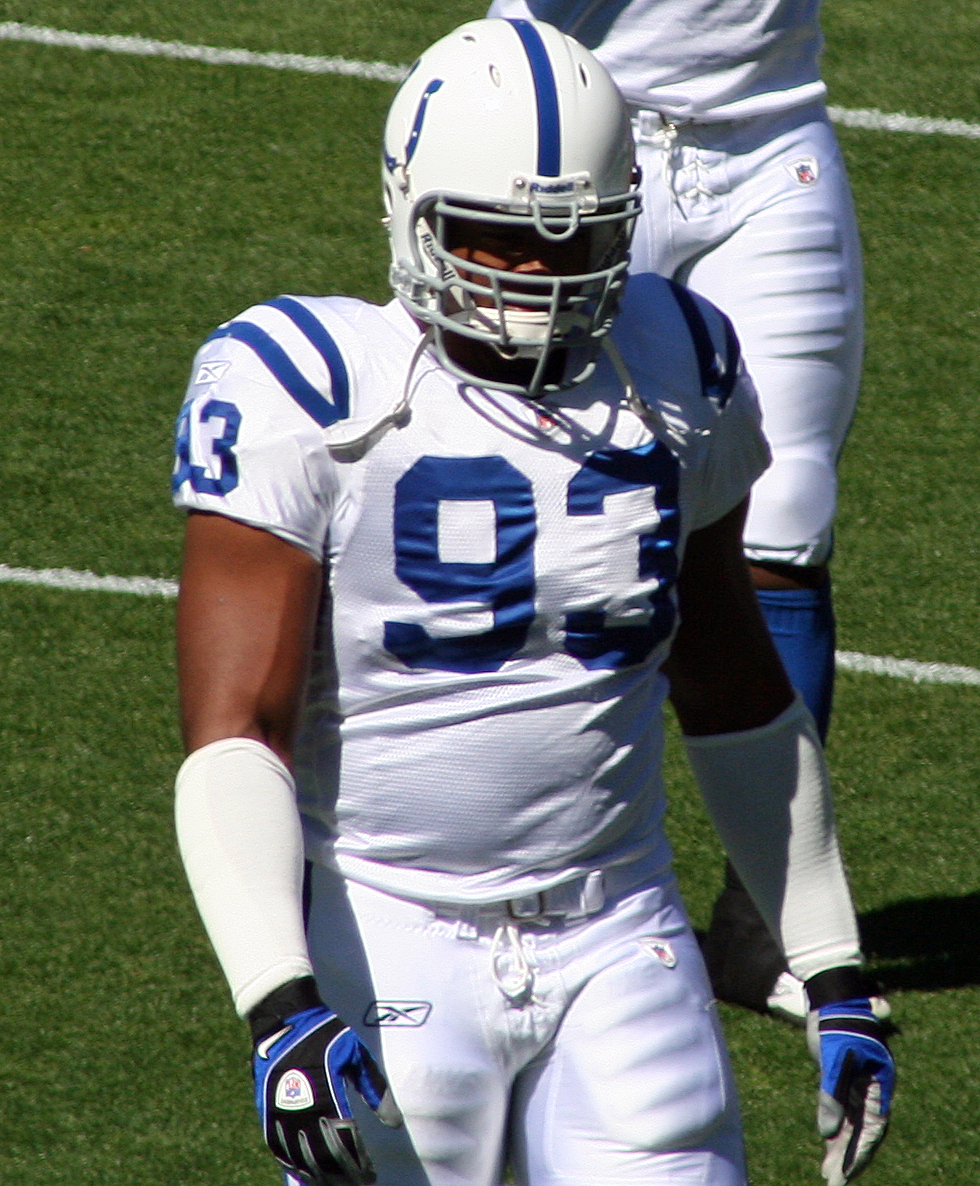
- Freeney with the Indianapolis Colts in 2010

Syracuse Orange
- Title: Director of player development

Personal information
- Born: February 19, 1980 (age 46); Hartford, Connecticut, U.S.
- Listed height: 6 ft 1 in (1.85 m)
- Listed weight: 268 lb (122 kg)

Career information
- Positions: Defensive end, linebacker (No. 93, 54)
- High school: Bloomfield (Bloomfield, Connecticut)
- College: Syracuse (1998–2001)
- NFL draft: 2002: 1st round, 11th overall pick

Career history

Playing
- Indianapolis Colts (2002–2012); San Diego Chargers (2013–2014); Arizona Cardinals (2015); Atlanta Falcons (2016); Seattle Seahawks (2017); Detroit Lions (2017)

Operations
- Syracuse (2025–present) Director of player development

Awards and highlights
- Super Bowl champion (XLI); 3× First-team All-Pro (2004, 2005, 2009); Second-team All-Pro (2003); 7× Pro Bowl (2003–2005, 2008–2011); NFL sacks leader (2004); NFL forced fumbles co-leader (2002); NFL 2000s All-Decade Team; PFWA All-Rookie Team (2002); Indianapolis Colts Ring of Honor; Unanimous All-American (2001); Big East Co-Defensive Player of the Year (2001); 2× First-team All-Big East (2000, 2001); Syracuse Orange No. 54 retired

Career NFL statistics
- Total tackles: 332
- Sacks: 125.5
- Forced fumbles: 47
- Fumble recoveries: 4
- Pass deflections: 17
- Defensive touchdowns: 1
- Stats at Pro Football Reference
- Pro Football Hall of Fame
- College Football Hall of Fame

Dwight Jason Freeney (born February 19, 1980) is an American former professional football player who currently serves as the Director of player development for Syracuse University. Freeney played as a defensive end and linebacker for 16 seasons in the National Football League (NFL), most notably as a member of the Indianapolis Colts. He played college football for the Syracuse Orange, earning unanimous All-American honors. He was selected by the Colts in the first round of the 2002 NFL draft. With the Colts, Freeney won Super Bowl XLI over the Chicago Bears, and made seven Pro Bowls. He also played for the San Diego Chargers, Arizona Cardinals, Atlanta Falcons, Seattle Seahawks and Detroit Lions.

== Early life ==
Freeney was born in Hartford, Connecticut to parents Hugh and Joy Freeney who immigrated from Jamaica. He attended Bloomfield High School in Bloomfield, Connecticut. Freeney was a four-sport letterman, earning four letters in baseball in which he was coached by Alphonso Ford; four in basketball; three in football, in which he played both ways; and one in soccer, in which he played goalie in his freshman year before switching over to football. Freeney holds the record for sacks at his high school and used to hold the record for most sacks in a high school career in the Connecticut record book. (Record now held by Mark Evanchick of Darien HS) Bloomfield High retired his No. 44 football jersey. During his youth, Freeney idolized New York Giants linebacker Lawrence Taylor.

== College career ==
Freeney received an athletic scholarship to attend Syracuse University, where he played for the Orange from 1998 to 2001. A two-year starter for Syracuse, he set a school record with 17.5 sacks in his senior season and his 34 career sacks rank second in school history to Tim Green (45.5). Freeney was the school's premier pass rusher, and once had a string of 17 consecutive games with at least one sack. Against Virginia Tech, Freeney sacked elusive Hokies quarterback Michael Vick 4.5 times in one game.

Freeney finished his college career with 104 tackles (68 unassisted), 34 quarterback sacks, 51 tackles for a loss, and 43 quarterback pressures. He was a first-team All-Big East Conference selection in 2000 and 2001, and was recognized as a unanimous first-team All-American following his senior season in 2001. He finished 9th in the final Heisman Trophy voting.

While attending Syracuse at a then 255-pounds, Freeney was clocked at 4.40 seconds during his 40-yard dash, and recorded 40-inch vertical jump. His 40-yard time remains among the fastest ever recorded for a defensive lineman.

Freeney still returns to Syracuse for his summer workouts, and serves as mentor to Syracuse players.

Freeney was inducted into the 2023 class of College Football Hall of Fame, becoming the 10th Syracuse player to be selected for the honor.

== Professional career ==
Pre-draft measurables
Height	Weight	Arm length	Hand span	40-yard dash	Vertical jump	Bench press
6 ft 0 7/8 in (1.85 m)	266 lb (121 kg)	32 1/8 in (0.82 m)	10 in (0.25 m)	4.48 s	37.0 in (0.94 m)	28 reps
All values from NFL Combine

=== Indianapolis Colts ===
Freeney was selected by the Indianapolis Colts with the 11th selection in the 2002 NFL draft. When drafted by Indianapolis at 270 lbs, Freeney was clocked at 4.48 seconds in the 40-yard dash and the same 40 inch vertical jump.

Freeney set an NFL rookie record in 2002 with nine forced fumbles, three of which occurred in a single game against former Syracuse football player, Donovan McNabb. Freeney was the runner up for the NFL Defensive Rookie of the Year award to Julius Peppers. He was named to the PFWA All-Rookie Team.

In 2004, Freeney's third season, he led the NFL with 16 sacks. At the end of his third season, Freeney's season marked him as the 3rd fastest player to achieve 40 sacks. He developed a spin move which became his trademark pass rush move. He was named to his second Pro Bowl and earned first team All-Pro honors for his performance in the 2004 season.

In 2006, Freeney helped the Colts defeat the Chicago Bears in Super Bowl XLI to become NFL Champions. He had a fumble recovery in the game.

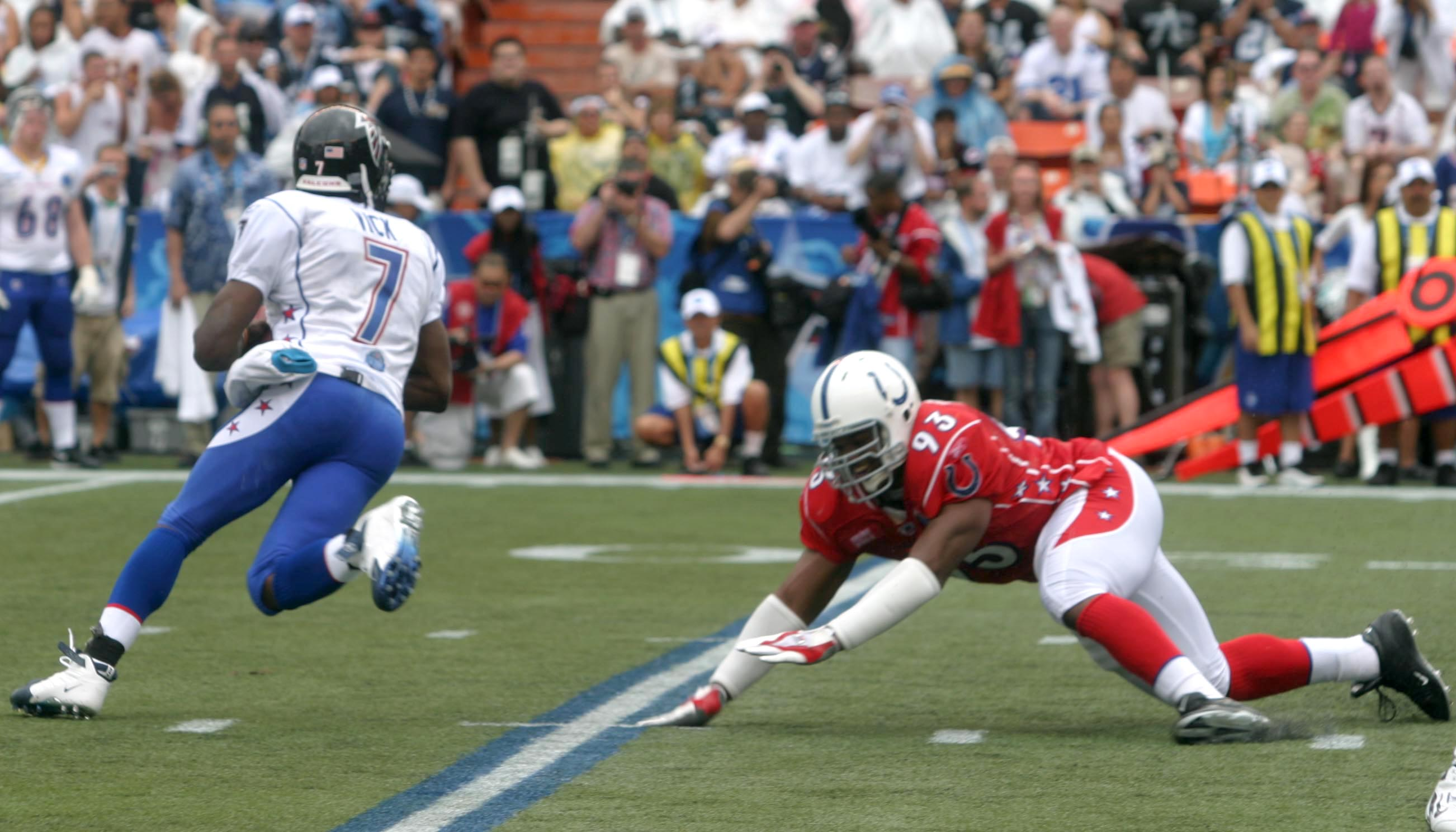
Freeney attempts to sack Michael Vick at the 2006 Pro Bowl.

On February 19, 2007, the Colts placed the franchise tag on Freeney following the expiration of his rookie contract. This move allowed Bill Polian and the Colts front office time to work on a long-term contract. On July 13, 2007, Freeney signed a six-year, $72 million contract with $30 million in guarantees making Freeney one of the highest paid defensive players in the NFL.

Freeney was fined $20,000 by the NFL for his expletive-laced interview following the end of the Colts 2008–09 playoff campaign which ended with a 23–17 overtime playoff loss to the San Diego Chargers in the Wild Card Round. The NFL cited Freeney for making "inappropriate comments on officiating," according to the Indianapolis Star. Freeney, frustrated by the three defensive penalties incurred as the Chargers made their game-winning drive, told Yahoo! Sports after the game: "Those were the worst fucking calls I've seen in a long time ... To have a game of that magnitude taken out of your hands, it's just disgusting. It's not like they made one fucking bad call -- it's three calls, in overtime ... They need to start investigating some other shit."

For his performance in the 2009 season, Freeney earned his fifth Pro Bowl appearance and earned first team All-Pro honors for the third time. He was ranked 15th by his fellow players on the NFL Top 100 Players of 2011.

In 2012, Freeney converted from defensive end to outside linebacker under new head coach Chuck Pagano. Due to injury and not adjusting to his position-change well, Freeney struggled and finished the season with only five sacks and 12 tackles.

On February 15, 2013, Freeney was told he would not be re-signed by the Colts. Freeney left as the all-time franchise leader in sacks with 107.5, but was surpassed by former teammate Robert Mathis the next season. Mathis would also break Freeney's franchise season record of 16 sacks the following season, too, when he tallied 19.5.

=== San Diego Chargers ===
On May 18, 2013, Freeney signed a two-year deal with the San Diego Chargers. During the 2013 season, Freeney suffered a season-ending quad injury against the Dallas Cowboys in week 4 and recorded a career low with 0.5 sacks.

In 2014, Freeney looked to bounce back from the previous year and did. Throughout the season, Freeney was only used as a pass rush specialist coming out only on passing downs. Against the Seattle Seahawks Freeney sacked Russell Wilson, which contributed to a Chargers victory. The next week, Freeney got a sack against the Buffalo Bills. Against the 49ers, Dwight Freeney and Ricardo Mathews sacked and forced a Colin Kaepernick fumble leading to a Chargers touchdown. The next week recorded one sack against Chase Daniel and the Chiefs. Freeney finished the season with 10 tackles, 3.5 sacks, and a pass deflect.

=== Arizona Cardinals ===
On October 12, 2015, Freeney signed a one-year, $870,000 deal with the Arizona Cardinals, with the incentive to receive a $200,000 bonus with four sacks and then would receive $100,000 for each sack thereafter, with a maximum of 12.

Freeney was named NFC Defensive Player of the Week for week 16, in which he had three sacks and a forced fumble, the first time he had three sacks in a game since 2006. Coincidentally, former Colts teammate Robert Mathis won AFC Defensive Player of the Week for the same week. Freeney appeared in nine games during the 2015 season, totaling 8.0 sacks (leading the team) and three forced fumbles.

=== Atlanta Falcons ===
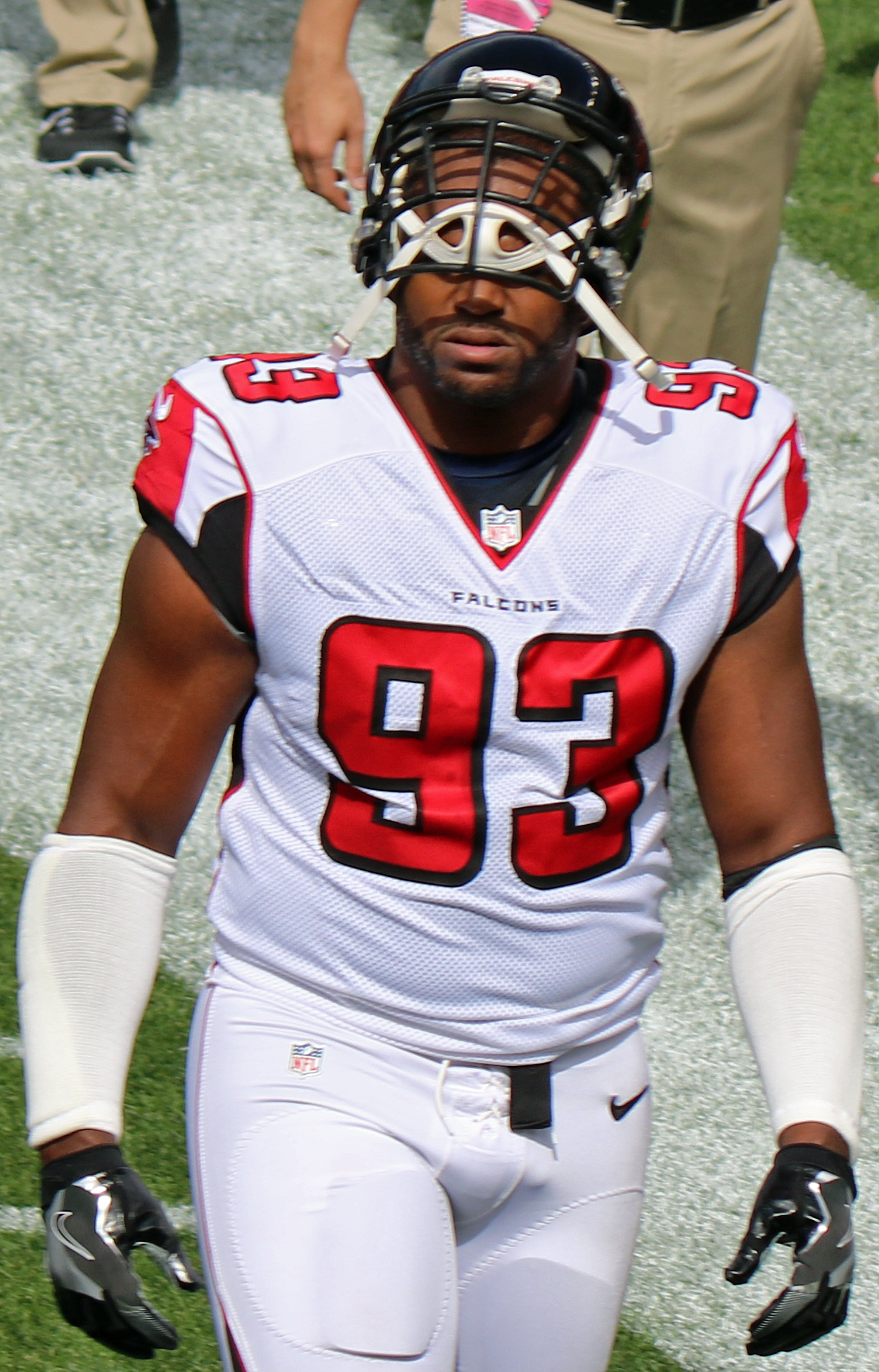
Freeney with the Atlanta Falcons in 2016

On August 2, 2016, Freeney signed a one-year deal with the Atlanta Falcons. He played in 15 games, totaling three sacks. The Falcons won the NFC Championship to advance to Super Bowl LI, bringing Freeney to his third career Super Bowl. Freeney had one sack in the big game, although the Falcons lost to the Patriots by a score of 34–28.

=== Seattle Seahawks ===
On October 24, 2017, Freeney signed a one-year deal with the Seattle Seahawks. After playing in four games recording three sacks, Freeney was released by the Seahawks on November 21.

=== Detroit Lions ===
On November 22, 2017, Freeney was claimed off waivers by the Detroit Lions. He played in five games with the team.

=== Retirement ===
Freeney announced his retirement on April 19, 2018, after signing a ceremonial one-day contract with the Colts to retire as a member of the team he spent the majority of his career with. On February 8, 2024, Freeney was inducted into the Pro Football Hall of Fame.

== Administrator career ==
On April 11, 2025, Freeney joined his alma mater Syracuse to serve as the Director of player development.

== NFL career statistics ==
Legend
	Won the Super Bowl
	Led the league
**Bold**	Career high

Year	Team	Games		Tackles				Fumbles				Interceptions					
Year	Team	GP	GS	Cmb	Solo	Ast	Sck	FF	FR	Yds	TD	Int	Yds	Avg	Lng	TD	PD
2002	IND	16	8	**46**	**45**	1	13.0	**9**	1	0	0	0	0	0.0	0	0	1
2003	IND	15	13	34	29	5	11.0	4	**2**	**23**	**1**	0	0	0.0	0	0	1
2004	IND	16	16	36	33	3	**16.0**	4	0	0	0	0	0	0.0	0	0	**3**
2005	IND	16	13	42	36	**6**	11.0	6	0	0	0	0	0	0.0	0	0	**3**
2006	IND	16	16	29	26	3	5.5	4	0	0	0	0	0	0.0	0	0	2
2007	IND	9	9	21	18	3	3.5	4	0	0	0	0	0	0.0	0	0	0
2008	IND	15	14	28	24	4	10.5	4	0	0	0	0	0	0.0	0	0	0
2009	IND	14	9	24	19	5	13.5	1	0	0	0	0	0	0.0	0	0	1
2010	IND	16	16	25	21	4	10.0	5	0	0	0	0	0	0.0	0	0	2
2011	IND	16	15	19	13	**6**	8.5	2	0	0	0	0	0	0.0	0	0	0
2012	IND	14	14	12	10	2	5.0	1	0	0	0	0	0	0.0	0	0	1
2013	SD	4	4	2	1	1	0.5	0	0	0	0	0	0	0.0	0	0	0
2014	SD	16	9	10	6	4	3.5	0	1	0	0	0	0	0.0	0	0	1
2015	ARI	11	0	9	8	1	8.0	3	0	0	0	0	0	0.0	0	0	0
2016	ATL	15	1	10	7	3	3.0	0	0	0	0	0	0	0.0	0	0	0
2017	SEA	4	0	3	3	0	3.0	0	0	0	0	0	0	0.0	0	0	1
2017	DET	5	0	0	0	0	0.0	0	0	0	0	0	0	0.0	0	0	0
Total		218	157	350	299	51	125.5	47	4	23	1	0	0	0.0	0	0	16

== Personal life ==
On March 28, 2012, Freeney's financial advisor was arrested and charged with embezzling $2.2 million from Freeney. In 2015, Freeney sued Bank of America for $20 million, claiming he trusted the bank's wealth management division with the assets. The lawsuit was eventually dismissed.
