= Spencer Ford =

American lacrosse player

Personal information
- Nationality: American
- Born: April 20, 1976 (age 49) Towson, Maryland, U.S.
- Height: 6 ft 0 in (183 cm)
- Weight: 200 lb (91 kg; 14 st 4 lb)

Sport
- Position: Attack
- MLL team Former teams: Washington Bayhawks; Long Island Lizards; Los Angeles Riptide; Rochester Rattlers; Baltimore Bayhawks
- Former NCAA team: Towson University
- Pro career: 2001–2009

Spencer Ford (born April 20, 1976) is a professional lacrosse player who played in the Major League Lacrosse for the Baltimore/Washington Bayhawks, Los Angeles Riptide, and the Rochester Rattlers. He then went into coaching and management before being named the head coach of the Philadelphia Barrage in 2020. He is currently the general manager of the Carolina Chaos of the Premier Lacrosse League.

== College career ==
Ford attended Towson University, where as a senior in 1999, he recorded 53 assists for a nation's leading 4.08 assists per game, ranking tenth all-time in NCAA Division I lacrosse. On March 20, 1999 he recorded 13 points (5 goals & 8 assists), which is the second highest points per game by an individual. While at Towson, he was named to the All-Conference team three times.

== Professional career ==
Ford began his pro lacrosse career in 2001 with the Baltimore Bayhawks, appearing in one game. He did not appear in another game until the 2006 MLL season, when Ford joined the Rochester Rattlers for a single game before being picked up by the Riptide for the remainder of the season. The 2007 season was a break-out season for Ford. He was named as Offensive Player of the Week on July 30, named to the 2007 All-Star Game, and broke Conor Gill's league assist record (40) with a 47 assist season. After the season, he was awarded with the Major League Lacrosse Most Improved Player of the Year Award.

== Statistics ==
=== MLL ===
		Regular Season							Playoffs
Season	Team	GP	G	2ptG	A	Pts	LB	PIM	GP	G	2ptG	A	Pts	LB	PIM
2001	Baltimore	1	0	0	0	0	0	0	-	-	-	-	-	-	-
2006	Rochester	1	0	0	3	3	1	0	-	-	-	-	-	-	-
2006	Los Angeles	6	6	0	11	17	5	1	-	-	-	-	-	-	-
2007	Los Angeles	12	13	0	47	60	23	1	2	2	0	6	8	4	0
2009	Washington	6	5	0	13	18	2	1	-	-	-	-	-	-	-
MLL Totals		26	24	0	74	98	31	3	2	2	0	6	8	4	0
