= 2008 Philadelphia Barrage season =

Season of an American lacrosse team

- Head coach: Tony Resch
- Home stadium: N/A

Results
- Record: 7–5
- Division place: 2nd Eastern Conference
- Playoffs: Lost MLL Semifinal Game to Rochester Rattlers 16–15 OT

The Philadelphia Barrage played their eighth season, as a charter member of the MLL (originally known as the Bridgeport Barrage), during the 2008 season of Major League Lacrosse. The Barrage ended up in 2nd place in the Eastern Conference with a record of 7–5. The Barrage qualified for the MLL Playoffs for the fourth time in franchise history.

The Barrage lost to the Rochester Rattlers 16–15 in OT in the MLL Semifinals at Harvard Stadium on August 23, 2008.

== Schedule ==
Date	Opponent	Home/Away	Field	Result
May 18	Bayhawks	Home	Virginia Beach Sportsplex	W 17–12
May 25	Lizards	Home	Texas Stadium	W 18–12
May 31	Rattlers	Away	PAETEC Park	L 9–22
June 5	Lizards	Away	Mitchel Athletic Complex	L 12–22
June 14	Machine	Home	Anheuser-Busch Center	W 12–11 OT
June 21	Rattlers	Home	WakeMed Soccer Park	L 17–20
June 28	Bayhawks	Away	George Mason Stadium	W 14–13
July 3	Cannons	Away	Harvard Stadium	W 16–14
July 10	Pride	Away	Yurcak Field	W 16–11
July 26	Riptide	Away	Home Depot Center	L 9–13
August 2	Cannons	Away	Harvard Stadium	W 16–11
August 9	Pride	Home	Hillsboro Stadium	L 16–17 OT

== Playoffs ==
Date	Round	Opponent	Field	Result
August 23	MLL Semifinals	Rattlers	Harvard Stadium	L 15–16 OT
