= Miguel Herlein =

Portuguese footballer

Personal information
- Full name: Miguel Bruno Pereira Herlein
- Date of birth: 11 February 1993 (age 33)
- Place of birth: Amora, Portugal
- Height: 1.81 m (5 ft 11 in)
- Position: Forward

Youth career
- 2001–2004: Amora
- 2004–2012: Benfica

Senior career*
Years	Team	Apps	(Gls)
2012–2013	Akritas	12	(0)
2013–2014	Granada B	12	(1)
2014	→ Vilaverdense (loan)	12	(3)
2014	Goa	5	(0)
2015	New York Cosmos B	11	(16)
2016	Águilas	8	(1)
2016	Civitanovese	8	(2)
2017	Penne		
2017–2021	Charneca Caparica	28	(6)
Total		96	(29)

International career
2009	Portugal U16	1	(0)
2010–2011	Portugal U18	9	(4)
- * Club domestic league appearances and goals

Miguel Bruno Pereira Herlein (born 11 February 1993) is a Portuguese former footballer who played as a forward.

== Club career ==
Born in Amora (Seixal) of Argentinian descent, Herlein played youth football with S.L. Benfica. He started his senior career with Akritas Chlorakas in the Cypriot Second Division.

Herlein signed with Spanish club Granada CF in March 2013, being assigned to the reserves in the Tercera División. In the following transfer window, he was loaned to Vilaverdense F.C. in his country's third tier.

After a brief spell in the Indian Super League with FC Goa, Herlein joined the New York Cosmos in 2015, being the leading scorer for their B team as they won the National Premier Soccer League; highlights included four goals in a 7–0 home win against the Seacoast United Phantoms on 11 July. Subsequently, he played amateur football in Spain, Italy and Portugal.

== International career ==
Herlein represented Portugal at under-16 and under-18 levels.
