= Alejandro Penzini =

Venezuelan footballer (born 1993)

Personal information
- Full name: Alejandro Penzini Pinedo
- Date of birth: April 23, 1993 (age 33)
- Place of birth: Caracas, Venezuela
- Height: 6 ft 2 in (1.88 m)
- Positions: Defender; midfielder; forward

College career
Years	Team	Apps	(Gls)
2011	St. John's Red Storm	0	(0)
2012–2016	Adelphi Panthers	77	(17)

Senior career*
Years	Team	Apps	(Gls)
2011	Real Esppor	1	(0)
2016	Westchester Flames	10	(1)
2017	New York Cosmos B		
2018–	New York Cosmos B		
- * Club domestic league appearances and goals as of 14:11, 31 January 2019 (UTC)

Alejandro Penzini Pinedo (born 23 April 1993) is a Venezuelan footballer who plays predominantly as a defender for the New York Cosmos B, however he is competent playing in any position.

== Career statistics ==
=== Club ===
As of 31 January 2019.

Club	Season	League			Cup		Continental		Other		Total	
Club	Season	Division	Apps	Goals	Apps	Goals	Apps	Goals	Apps	Goals	Apps	Goals
Real Esppor	2010–11	Venezuelan Primera División	1	0	0	0	0	0	0	0	1	0
Westchester Flames	2016	USL League Two	10	1	0	0	–		0	0	10	1
Career total			11	1	0	0	0	0	0	0	11	1
