= AFC Cleveland =

American soccer club

- Full name: Association Football Club Cleveland
- Nickname: Royals
- Founded: November 11, 2011; 14 years ago
- Dissolved: December 12, 2017; 8 years ago
- Ground: Stan Skoczen Stadium, Independence, OH
- Capacity: 2,200
Home colors

AFC Cleveland was an American semi-professional soccer club based in the Cleveland suburb of Independence, Ohio. Founded in 2011 and playing its first season in 2012, the team spent six years in the fourth-tier National Premier Soccer League. After being expelled from the NPSL at the end of the 2017 season, AFC Cleveland folded and was replaced by Cleveland SC, who began play in the NPSL in 2018.

== History ==
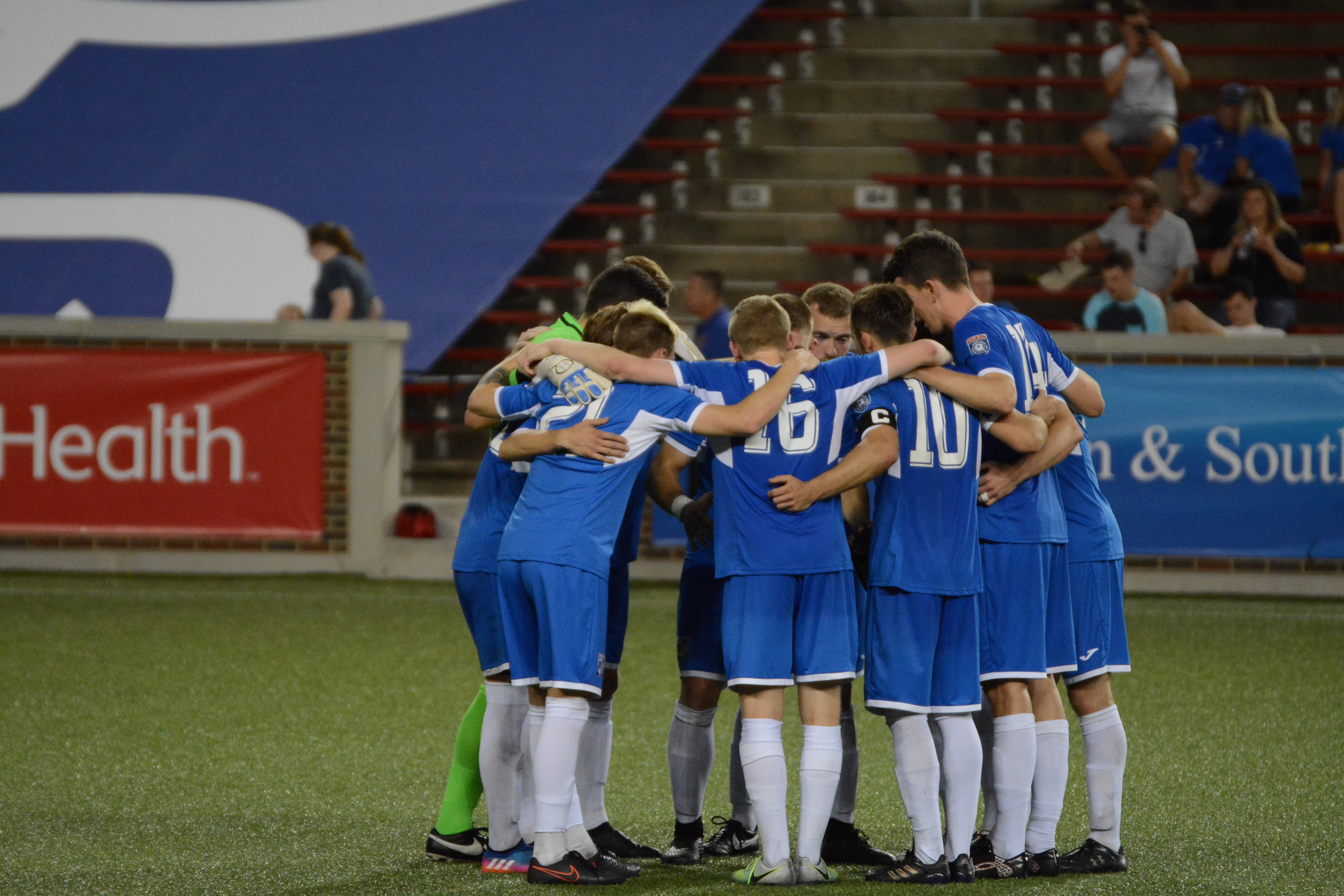
Cleveland players huddle before a game against FC Cincinnati in 2017

Following the folding of the Cleveland Internationals in 2010, the city of Cleveland was without a soccer team. On November 11, 2011, AFC Cleveland announced that they would join the National Premier Soccer League.

AFC stands for A Fans' Club, signifying that the organization is for the fans and created by the fans, and was inspired by the English club AFC Wimbledon.

== Stadium ==
Period	Stadium	Location
2012	Byers Field	Parma, Ohio
2013	Krenzler Field	Cleveland, Ohio
2014	DiSanto Field	Cleveland, Ohio
2015	Rocky River HS Stadium	Rocky River, Ohio
2016–2017	Stan Skoczen Stadium	Independence, Ohio

== Kit supplier and sponsorship ==
From 2012 to 2013, the kit sponsor of the club was Admiral Sportswear. Beginning with the 2014 season, Givova took over as the kit sponsor.

Period	Kit manufacturer	Shirt sponsor
2012–2013	Admiral Sportswear	AdmiralSoccer.com
2014–2015	Givova	Rocky River Urgent Care
2016–2017	Joma	NovaCare

== Club culture ==
=== Supporters ===
6th City Syndicate is the supporters' group for Cleveland soccer.

=== Rivalries ===
- Supporters of AFC Cleveland, Detroit City FC, and FC Buffalo formed the Rust Belt Derby, modeled after the Cascadia Cup. The winner of the Derby was based on the head to head record of the Midwestern clubs during regular season NPSL matches. Cleveland won the initial Rust Belt Derby on June 23, 2012, following a 1–1 draw with Detroit.
- AFC Cleveland also participated in in-state rivalry matches against Zanesville Athletic FC, with whom they contested the Presidential Cup, and Dayton Dynamo. Prior to the Cincinnati Saints relocating to Dayton to become the Dynamo, they and AFC Cleveland played for the I-71 Cup.

== Players and staff ==
=== Notable former players ===
This list of notable former players comprises players who went on to play professional soccer after playing for the team in the NPSL, or those who previously played professionally before joining the team.

- (United States) Robby Dambrot
- (United States) Bryan Gallego
- (United States) Riley Grant
- (United States) Alex Ivanov
- (Angola) Sergio Manesio
- (United States) Bradley Ruhaak
- (United States) Nate Shultz
- (Japan) Kotaro Umeda
- (United States) Matt Walker
- (United States) Shane Wiedt

=== Head coach history ===
Name	Nationality	Tenure
Andy Hoggarth	England	2012–2014
Aaron McGuiness	Australia	2014
Carter Poe	United States	2015–2017
Mike Sesar	United States	2017

== Honors ==
National
Competitions	Titles	Seasons
National Premier Soccer League	1	2016
Midwest Region (Playoffs)	1	2016
Great Lakes Conference (Playoffs)	2	2012, 2016
Great Lakes Conference (Regular Season)	1	2016

Minor Trophies

- Rust Belt Derby Champions: 2012
- Presidential Cup Champions: 2013
- I-71 Cup Champions: 2015

== Year-by-year ==
Season	Division	League	Regular Season	Playoffs	U.S. Open Cup
2012	4	NPSL	3rd, Midwest-Great Lakes	Regional Finals	Did not qualify
2013	4	NPSL	4th, Midwest-Great Lakes	Conference Semi-Finals	Declined Entry
2014	4	NPSL	3rd, Midwest-Great Lakes East	Did not qualify	Did not qualify
2015	4	NPSL	2nd, Midwest Conference	Regional Finals	Did not qualify
2016	4	NPSL	1st, Midwest-Great Lakes East	Champions	2nd Round
2017	4	NPSL	4th Midwest - East	Did not qualify	2nd Round
