= 2005 Philadelphia Barrage season =

Season of an American lacrosse team

- Head coach: Tony Resch
- Home stadium: Villanova Stadium

Results
- Record: 4–8
- Division place: 3rd American Division
- Playoffs: failed to qualify

The Philadelphia Barrage played their fifth season, as a charter member of the MLL (originally known as the Bridgeport Barrage), during the 2005 season of Major League Lacrosse. The Barrage ended up in 3rd place in the American Division with a record of 4–8. The Barrage failed to qualify for the 2005 season MLL playoffs.

== Schedule ==
Date	Opponent	Home/Away	Field	Result
May 29	Cannons	Home	Villanova Stadium	L 12–13
June 4	Lizards	Home	Villanova Stadium	L 14–19
June 12	Bayhawks	Away	Johnny Unitas Stadium	L 9–31
June 18	Pride	Away	Alumni Stadium (Kean University)	W 11–10
June 25	Lizards	Away	Mitchel Athletic Complex	L 12–18
June 30	Cannons	Away	Nickerson Field	W 15–14
July 9	Rattlers	Away	Bishop Kearney Field	W 26–15
July 14	Rattlers	Home	Villanova Stadium	L 10–14
July 23	Cannons	Away	Nickerson Field	L 10–11
July 28	Lizards	Home	Villanova Stadium	W 16–14
August 4	Bayhawks	Home	Villanova Stadium	L 9–19
August 11	Pride	Home	Villanova Stadium	L 12–16
