= 2004 Philadelphia Barrage season =

Season of an American lacrosse team

- Head coach: Sal LoCascio
- Home stadium: Villanova Stadium

Results
- Record: 7–5
- Division place: 2nd American Division
- Playoffs: Won MLL Championship over Boston Cannons 13–11

The Philadelphia Barrage played their fourth season, as a charter member of the MLL (originally known as the Bridgeport Barrage), during the 2004 season of Major League Lacrosse. The Barrage played in Bridgeport, Connecticut from the 2001 to the 2003 season and relocated to the Philadelphia suburb of Villanova for the 2004 season. The Barrage ended up in 2nd place in the American Division with a record of 7–5. They qualified for the MLL Playoffs for the first time in franchise history. In the semi-finals, they defeated the Rochester Rattlers 18–17 in OT at Nickerson Field on August 20, 2004. The Barrage won their 1st MLL Championship by defeating the Boston Cannons 13–11 in the MLL Championship Game at Nickerson Field on August 22, 2004.

== Schedule ==
Date	Opponent	Home/Away	Field	Result
May 22	Pride	Home	Villanova Stadium	L 13–17
May 29	Rattlers	Away	Bishop Kearney Field	L 17–24
June 6	Lizards	Home	Villanova Stadium	L 12–14
June 12	Pride	Away	Sprague Field	W 15–12
June 19	Bayhawks	Home	Villanova Stadium	L 18–19 OT
June 26	Rattlers	Home	Villanova Stadium	W 19–15
July 10	Cannons	Away	Nickerson Field	L 18–20
July 15	Lizards	Home	Villanova Stadium	W 18–17
July 22	Cannons	Away	Nickerson Field	W 29–20
July 31	Bayhawks	Away	Johnny Unitas Stadium	W 17–13
August 7	Lizards	Away	Mitchel Athletic Complex	W 18–12
August 14	Cannons	Home	Villanova Stadium	W 18–17

== Playoffs ==
Date	Round	Opponent	Field	Result
August 20	MLL Semifinals	Rattlers	Nickerson Field	W 18–17 OT
August 22	MLL Championship Game	Cannons	Nickerson Field	W 13–11
