= Greater Lowell United FC =

Soccer club in Massachusetts, U.S.

- Full name: Greater Lowell United Football Club
- Nickname(s): GLUFC, Lowell Dragons
- Founded: 2013; 12 years ago
- Stadium: Cawley Memorial Stadium; Lowell, Massachusetts
- Capacity: 6,000
- Owner: Manny Andrade
- Website: http://www.pitchero.com/clubs/greaterlowellunitedfootballclub
Home colors	Away colors

Greater Lowell United FC is an American soccer club based in Lowell, Massachusetts. GLUFC's first-team began play in the North Atlantic Conference of the National Premier Soccer League (NPSL) in 2014. The club left the NPSL and joined the Champions Soccer League USA (CSL USA) for the 2017 season.

The team plays its home games on an artificial-turf field at historic Cawley Memorial Stadium, located in the Belvidere section of Lowell. In 2014, the NPSL team also played in Bedford and Lawrence, but Cawley is now the permanent home to GLUFC's top team. The junior team plays BSSL matches at Greater Lowell Technical High School.

== History ==
Greater Lowell United FC was founded in 2013 as an expansion team to join the National Premier Soccer League (NPSL) for the 2014 season. GLUFC also fielded two junior teams that season, one in the Massachusetts State Soccer League (MSSL) and one in the Bay State Soccer League (BSSL). The club dropped the MSSL team after the 2014 season but kept a team in the BSSL. In 2015, GLUFC's junior team was only competing in the second half of the 2015 BSSL season.

GLUFC's top team played three seasons in the NPSL, a national amateur league that includes reserve teams from North American Soccer League (NASL) clubs. In 2014, the team won one game, drew one game and lost 10 games. GLUFC struggled early on under Coach Jason Moore, a former Major League Soccer (MLS) No. 1 draft pick, but rebounded under Coach Daniel Hristov, who replaced Moore after the second game of the season. Shortly after Hristov's arrival, the 2014 team beat the Rhode Island Reds, 2–0, in Bedford, and drew 0–0 with New York Athletic Club in Lawrence. However, Hristov and the club parted ways for the 2015 NPSL season, which saw Luis Costa arrive as head coach. Costa's sides performed well in several matches but failed to achieve results, losing 9 games and drawing one before Costa departed the club with two games left to play. Hayden Barbosa, an assistant coach at Daniel Webster College, coached the final two games, both of which were losses, including a 2–1 decision dropped to eventual undefeated NPSL champions New York Cosmos B in New York.

Barbosa took over as coach of the NPSL team for the 2016 season.

In 2015, goalkeeper Sam Manning earned a spot on the soccer team at Millersville University.

In 2016, GLUFC left the NPSL, parting with its former co-owner and manager Andrea Gauntlett, who retained the right to field an NPSL team in the Greater Lowell area. GLUFC joined the CSL USA for the 2017 season. The club was placed in the league's North-East Division.

== Ownership ==
In the summer of 2013, Lowell local Tim Melican founded GLUFC and began as owner of the club. In 2015, Melican left the club altogether and forfeited his ownership share. The club also has a board of directors made up of several residents of the Greater Lowell area.

== Head coach ==
Hayden Barbosa will serve as head coach of GLUFC's National Premier Soccer League team in 2016.

== Colors and crest ==
The club's home colors are black and green, while on the road the team wears green and white. The motto Magnus Viridis (Big Green) is prevalent on the club's coat of arms.
