= P. T. Ricci =

American professional lacrosse player (born 1987)

Personal information
- Nationality: American
- Born: July 10, 1987 (age 39) Wayne, Pennsylvania, U.S.
- Height: 5 ft 10 in (178 cm)
- Weight: 185 lb (84 kg; 13 st 3 lb)

Sport
- Position: Defense
- Shoots: Right
- NLL draft: 45th overall, 2009; Philadelphia Wings
- MLL team Former teams: Philadelphia Barrage; Chesapeake Bayhawks; Boston Cannons; Florida Launch
- NCAA team: Loyola College
- Pro career: 2009–2020

Peter Thomas Ricci (born July 10, 1987) is an American professional lacrosse player who last played for the Philadelphia Barrage of Major League Lacrosse. Ricci played four years for Loyola College in Baltimore, Maryland and graduated from Conestoga High School in Berwyn, Pennsylvania in 2005, after starring in football and lacrosse and running track. He finished his senior season at Loyola with a team leading 91 ground balls, and was the eleventh draft pick in the 2009 MLL Draft to the Chesapeake Bayhawks. After two seasons with the Bayhawks he was traded to the Boston Cannons in May 2011. He won consecutive championships in 2010 and 2011 with the Chesapeake Bayhawks and Boston Cannons respectively, attributing to the Cannons first Steinfeld Trophy in MLL history. He was also selected as an all-star in 2011 season. He was traded by the Boston Cannons to the Florida Launch in November 2013 along with Lee Coppersmith and the 12th overall draft pick in the 2014 draft for Brodie Merrill, Martin Cahill and the 37th overall draft pick in the 2014 draft. He signed a 2-year deal with the Florida Launch in January 2017. In February 2020 he was traded to the Philadelphia Barrage along with three draft picks in the 2020 MLL draft for Bryan Cole and Randy Staats.
