= FC Buffalo =

- Full name: Football Club Buffalo
- Nicknames: Blitzers, Wolves, Buffalonians
- Founded: 2009; 17 years ago
- Stadium: Coyer Field; Buffalo, New York
- Capacity: 3,000
- Owner: Nick Mendola
- Head Coach: Carl Kennedy
- League: USL League Two
- 2026: in progress Playoffs: In
- Website: fcbuffalo.org
Home colors	Away colors

FC Buffalo is an American soccer club based in Buffalo, New York, United States, with teams in men's and women's soccer.

Founded in 2009, the men's team plays in the USL League Two, a national amateur league at the fourth tier of the American Soccer Pyramid, in the Midwest Division. In 2021, club owner Nicholas Mendola announced the launch of a women's soccer team, which started play in United Women's Soccer in May and went on to win four consecutive division titles. They are now in USL W League.

The team plays its home games at Coyer Field, the stadium of the Buffalo State Bengals. The team's colors are blue, gold and white.

FC Buffalo participates in the Erie County Derby against Erie Commodores FC, a regional rivalry featuring two clubs in different states and different leagues who share counties of the same name. FC Buffalo also participated in the Western New York Derby against Rochester Lancers and the I-90 Derby against Syracuse FC.

== History ==
=== Founding and inaugural season ===
FC Buffalo joined the NPSL as an expansion franchise in 2009 and took part in its first competitive season in 2010 with games held at Robert E. Rich All High Stadium. While not a continuation of either franchise, FC Buffalo follows in the footsteps of two other recent Buffalo-based teams that competed in the NPSL: Queen City FC and Buffalo City FC. The team was formed by a group of seven Buffalonians: Donny Kutzbach, Brent Garner, Ryan Knapp, Nick Mendola, Joshua Batten, Scott Frauenhofer, and Ray Siminski. In the off-season following the 2022 season, supporters' group member Jonathan Baird invested in the club's ownership.

The club had a contest for fans to submit a nickname and after much debate and thousands of votes cast, "Blitzers" was chosen. The vote was aided by Buffalo native and CNN broadcaster Wolf Blitzer airing an interview with owners Nick Mendola and Scott Frauenhofer discussing the contest. The supporters' group is named "The Situation Room" after Blitzer's primetime news program on CNN.

ESPN correspondent Vincent Thomas commented: "Although the 'Blitzers' nickname has ended up being a pretty deft marketing move, it's more legit than a ploy. The term blitz comes from the German word for lightning, which is all over the team's logo and the city's municipal flag. And, of course, there's a mutual fondness between Blitzer and his hometown."

The Blitzers finished their opening campaign with six wins, two draws and four losses. They were the only team to defeat the Keystone Conference champion FC Sonic.

=== Subsequent seasons ===
On Dec 8, 2010, the Blitzers announced they had parted ways with head coach Jim Hesch. Ten days later, they announced via their web site that they had inked Daniel Krzyzanowicz to coach the club into the future. Krzyzanowicz helmed a Medaille College program that has made the NCAA tournament five times and reached the Sweet Sixteen in 2010.

The 2011 season was up-and-down, with the Blitzers winning five, drawing one and losing six. During the season the Blitzers took on the Bedlington Terriers F.C. in a friendly match at All High Stadium in the inaugural Bedlington Cup. Due to the connection of Robert E. Rich Jr. to Buffalo, NY and Bedlington, England. The friendly was arranged and the Terriers traveled to Buffalo for the match. The Blitzers won 5–1 in front of a sell out crowd. The match was filmed and later made into a BBC documentary called Mr Rich and The Terriers

The team's mascot Wolf Blitzer was unveiled at the Winter Wolves fund raiser. 2012 Season tickets were sold at the event. The unique feature of the 2012 season ticket is that it consists of a special season ticket holder's scarf that will function as admission to the season's home matches.

FC Buffalo saw its first player drafted into Major League Soccer on January 17, 2012, when midfielder Krystian Witkowski was claimed in the second round of the supplemental draft by the Philadelphia Union. The team then saw a player drafted into Major League Soccer for the second-consecutive year, as second-leading scorer Mike Reidy was selected 71st overall in the 2013 MLS Supplemental Draft by Sporting KC.

On November 20, 2012, FC Buffalo signed its third head coach, Brendan Murphy. The Buffalo native was a national champion as a player at St. Lawrence University. He led the team to a playoff spot in his first season, where they lost 5–2 to rivals Erie.

MLS called again in the 2017 MLS SuperDraft, when Liam Callahan went 24th overall to the Colorado Rapids and Russell Cicerone was selected by the Portland Timbers with the 76th pick. Weeks later, head coach Brendan Murphy was hired as goalkeeping coach by the Rochester Rhinos, and FC Buffalo hired University at Buffalo alum and Grand Island High School coach Frank Butcher as manager, tabbing former players John Grabowski and Casey Derkacz as assistants.

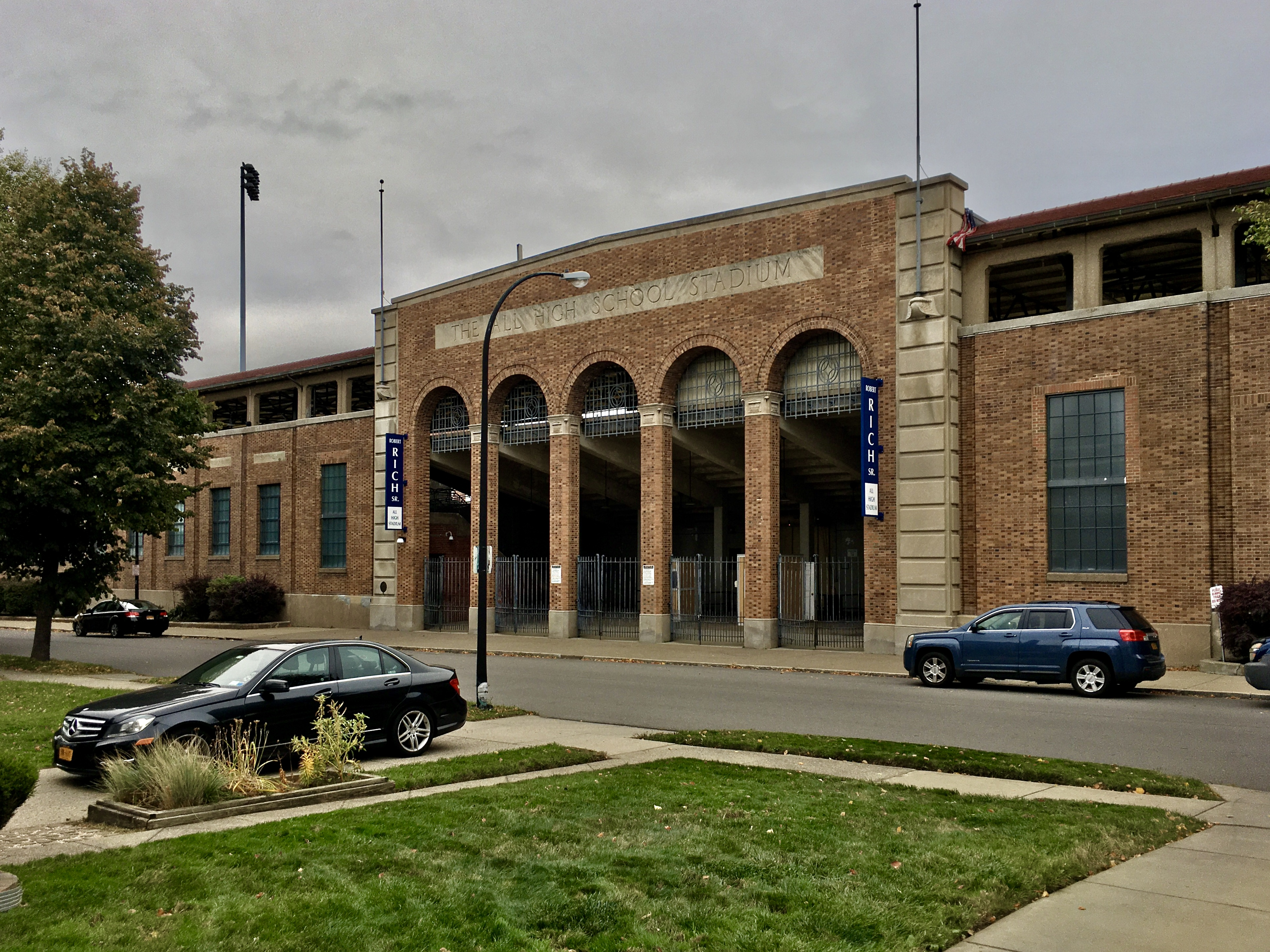
All-High Stadium, where FC Buffalo played until 2025

Butcher was the fastest coach to 10 wins in club history, and led the team to Germany for the 2019 preseason. The club played three matches including one against FC St. Pauli II, and also welcomed the Liga MX reserva side Monarcas Morelia and FC St. Pauli's first team for international friendlies.

The club elevated Butcher into an administrative position in 2021, hiring Ryan "Ozzy" Osborne as first team men's coach. Osborne won the Great Lakes Conference with Cleveland SC.

On May 9, 2022, the team announced that they would play their home games for the 2022 season at Dobson Field on the campus of D'Youville University while All-High Stadium is renovated. After the renovations at All High were completed, Buffalo Public Schools initially declined to have the team play its matches there for the 2023 season, which forced an emergency field location at Williamsville South High School for the team's challenging first season in USL League Two. Then in April 2024, the club were welcomed back to All High ahead of the upcoming season.

As previously mentioned, on February 9th, 2023, it was announced that FC Buffalo would be joining the USL League Two for the upcoming 2023 season. The first season was played in the Valley Division, where they only won a single match out of the 11 they had played.

On February 6th, 2025, it was announced that recently created Buffalo Pro Soccer had acquired the Blitzers' youth academy, and had renamed it accordingly. Shortly after on February 11th, the USL League Two announced that FC Buffalo would become a founding member of the new Great Forest division, along with several other clubs from the Rust Belt area.

On April 24th, 2025, FC Buffalo announced it would begin playing home games at Coyer Field, where they remain as of the 2026 season.

== Kit ==
The team take inspiration for their colors, royal blue and yellow gold, from the classic Buffalo Sabres uniforms. The badge features a crest with a soccer ball inside a circle of electric flashes under the team name and founding year. The logo is reminiscent of the municipal flag of Buffalo, NY. In 2015, the team returned to a Nike manufactured shirt and introduced three sets of uniforms. One all blue, one all yellow, and one all white. The kits can be mixed and matched on game day to create multiple unique and colorful looks.

The first front jersey sponsor was Rich Products, a multinational food production corporation headquartered in Buffalo, New York. Rich's also owns and sponsors the local Triple-A International League baseball team, the Buffalo Bisons. The front of shirt is now sponsored by The Martin Group, a marketing firm, and the club is also sponsored by Bison Dip, Colvin Cleaners, and Batavia Downs Gaming & Casino are the two other shirt sponsors.

=== Kit manufacturers ===
- 2010–2011: Nike
- 2012–2014: Admiral
- 2015–2016: Nike
- 2016–2021: Adidas
- 2022–2023: Corner Kits
- 2023–2024: PUMA
- 2025–present: hummel

=== Shirt sponsors ===
- 2010: Papa Jake's Saloon
- 2011–2016: Rich Products
- 2017: Lif Dental
- 2018: Soho Buffalo / Frankie Primo's +39
- 2019–2021: Hofbrauhaus Buffalo
- 2023: Community Beerworks
- 2023–2025: The Martin Group
- 2026-present: MagnaSport

== Players and staff ==
=== Current roster ===
As of May 25, 2026

Note: Flags indicate national team as defined under FIFA eligibility rules; some limited exceptions apply. Players may hold more than one non-FIFA nationality.

No.	Pos.	Nation	Player
0	GK	CAN	Grant Wyles
1	GK	USA	Jack Root
2	DF	USA	Chase Dade
3	DF	USA	Kiryl Dubins
4	DF	AUS	Max Trushell
5	DF	GER	Jonas Driesch
6	MF	THA	Shawn Richardson
7	FW	BRA	Matheus Spina
8	MF	BRA	Lucas Soares
9	FW	ENG	Evan Cunningham
10	MF	YEM	Ali Alomari
11	MF	USA	Declan Sengbusch
13	DF	HUN	Dominik Varga
14	MF	GER	Jacob Doehmen
15	MF	USA	Zach Bonuito
16	DF	USA	Ashton Jell
17	MF	CAN	Thomas Brooks
23	MF	CHI	Carlos Vial Aedo

No.	Pos.	Nation	Player
24	MF	USA	Constantine Santacrose
33	GK	USA	Dante Gesamondo
71	GK	CHI	Kevin Leiva
77	FW	SVN	Lovro Kostanjsek
-	DF	ENG	Matty Doyle
-	MF	USA	Gavin Jell
-	MF	USA	Luca Buscaglia
-	DF	GER	Oliver Eckhardt
-	FW	GER	Robert Franke
-	FW	USA	Leon Tezuka
-	GK	CAN	Anthony Di Gioia
-	FW	USA	Owen Sweeney
-	MF	USA	James Gilbert
-	FW	USA	Robert Woods
-	FW	CAN	Josh Miller
-	MF	ENG	Alex Ward
-	MF	USA	Nico Buscaglia

== Year-by-year ==
Year	Division	League	Regular season	W-L-D	Playoffs	Open Cup
2010	4	NPSL	3rd, Keystone	6–4–2	did not qualify	did not enter
2011	4	NPSL	5th, Keystone	5–6–1	did not qualify	Lost qual. playoff
2012	4	NPSL	5th, Midwest-Great Lakes	1–7–4	did not qualify	did not enter
2013	4	NPSL	2nd, Midwest-Great Lakes	8–5–0	Conference semifinals	did not qualify
2014	4	NPSL	4th, Midwest-Great Lakes East	5–8–1	did not qualify	did not qualify
2015	4	NPSL	5th, Midwest-Great Lakes East	6–2–4	did not qualify	did not qualify
2016	4	NPSL	3rd, Midwest-Great Lakes East	5–3–2	did not qualify	did not qualify
2017	4	NPSL	5th, Midwest-East	5–4–3	did not qualify	did not qualify
2018	4	NPSL	4th, Midwest-East	6–4–2	did not qualify	did not enter
2019	4	NPSL	4th, Midwest-East	4–4–2	did not qualify	did not enter
2021	4	NPSL	3rd, Midwest-Rust Belt	4–4–2	did not qualify	did not enter
2022	4	NPSL	3rd, Midwest-Rust Belt	5–6–2	did not qualify	did not enter
2023	4	USL2	6th, Valley	1–7–3	did not qualify	did not qualify
2024	4	USL2	4th, Valley	5–4–3	did not qualify	did not qualify
2025	4	USL2	2nd, Great Forest	7–2–3	did not qualify	did not qualify
2026	4	USL2	2nd, Great Forest	7–3–3	Conference quarterfinals	TBD
Total				80-73-36	0–2	

== Tournaments ==
Year	Tournament	League	Regular season	W-L-D
2020	2020 NISA Independent Cup	NISA	3rd	0–0–2
2021	2021 NISA Independent Cup	NISA	2nd	2–1–0

== Managerial history ==
Coach	Years	League W-L-D	Playoffs
Jim Hesch	2010	6–4–2	DNQ
Dan Krzyzanowicz	2011–2012	6–13–5	DNQ
Brendan Murphy	2013–2016	24–18–7	0–1
Frank Butcher	2017–2021	19–16–9	DNQ
Ryan "Ozzy" Osborne	2022	1-2-1	DNQ
Dan Panaro	2022	4-4-0	DNQ
Casey Derkacz	2023	1-7-3	DNQ
Sean Hallas	2024	5-4-3	DNQ
Carl Kennedy	2025–present	14-4-6	0-1
Total			80-73–36

== Honors ==
- Erie County Derby Champions: 2015, 2016, 2017, 2019, 2020, 2021, 2024 (derby was not staged in 2023 nor 2025)

=== International friendly ===
- Lord Bedlington Cup
  - Winners (1): 2011

In inaugural competition, defeated Bedlington Terriers F.C. of England's Northern League, 5 – 1

== Rivalries ==
- Supporters of FC Buffalo, Detroit City and AFC Cleveland formed the Rust Belt Derby modeled after the Cascadia Cup. The winner of the Derby is based on the head-to-head record of the Midwestern Conference clubs during regular season NPSL matches. Cleveland won the inaugural Rust Belt Derby on June 23, 2012, following a 1–1 draw with Detroit.
- FC Buffalo claim as their top rival Erie and the sides compete in the EC (Erie County) Derby. To Date FC Buffalo have five wins, eight losses and three ties against Erie and is unbeaten in its last six.

== Stadium ==
- All-High Stadium; Buffalo, New York (2010–2013, 2015–2021, 2022–2025)
- Coyer Field; Buffalo, New York (2025–present)
- Dobson Field; Buffalo, New York (2022)
- Demske Sports Complex; Buffalo, New York (2014)
- Hamburg High School; Hamburg, New York (2015 – 1 match)

== Fans ==
- FC Buffalo's supporters group is known as "The Situation Room"; named after Wolf Blitzer's CNN news program. Their goal is to create an atmosphere that is the loudest and most inclusive of any fan base in the City of Buffalo.

== Media ==
External videos
- FC Buffalo home game broadcasts

All FC Buffalo home games are streamed live on the club's SportsEngine Play channel.

The club's broadcast team consists of Jeffrey Boyd on play-by-play, and Mike Babcock on color commentary.

== Affiliated teams ==
- Bedlington Terriers F.C.
- Buffalo Bisons
- Jamestown Jammers
