= Mike Reidy =

American soccer player (born 1991)

Personal information
- Full name: Michael Andrew Reidy
- Date of birth: April 2, 1991 (age 35)
- Place of birth: Rochester, New York, United States
- Height: 1.70 m (5 ft 7 in)
- Positions: Attacking midfielder; winger

Youth career
- 2009–2012: Colgate Raiders

Senior career*
Years	Team	Apps	(Gls)
2012	FC Buffalo	14	(8)
2013	Rochester Rhinos	20	(0)
- * Club domestic league appearances and goals as of July 15, 2013

Michael Andrew Reidy (born April 2, 1991) is an American soccer player.

== Career ==
=== College ===
Reidy played college soccer at Colgate University between 2009 and 2012.

During his senior year, Reidy also played for FC Buffalo in the National Premier Soccer League.

=== Professional ===
Reidy was selected in the fourth round (71st overall) by Sporting Kansas City in the 2013 MLS Supplemental Draft. However, he did not earn a contract with the Major League Soccer club.

Reidy signed his first professional contract in March, 2013 with his home-town club Rochester Rhinos of the USL Pro.
