= John Neeskens =

American soccer player

Personal information
- Full name: John Andreu Neeskens Ramírez
- Date of birth: November 17, 1993 (age 32)
- Place of birth: Tulsa, Oklahoma, United States
- Height: 6 ft 1 in (1.85 m)
- Positions: Center-back; left-back

Youth career
- 2006–2007: Anguera
- 2007–2010: Damm
- 2010–2011: Villarreal
- 2011–2012: Damm
- 2012: Sant Andreu

Senior career*
Years	Team	Apps	(Gls)
2012–2013	Sant Andreu	14	(0)
2013–2014	Badalona	15	(0)
2014	Colorado Rapids Reserves	5	(0)
2014	Colorado Rapids	5	(1)
2015	New York Cosmos B	0	(0)
2016	LA Galaxy II	4	(0)
2016–2017	Gavà	4	(1)
2017	Santboià	8	(1)
2018	New York Cosmos B	12	(1)
2019	Miami	8	(2)
2019	AS Trenčín	2	(1)
2020	Formentera	8	(0)
2020–2021	Prat	27	(1)
2021–2022	Lleida Esportiu	30	(1)
2022–2024	Terrassa	56	(1)
2024–2025	Europa	30	(1)
2025–2026	FC Eindhoven	36	(1)
- * Club domestic league appearances and goals as of April 28, 2026

John Andreu Neeskens Ramírez (born November 17, 1993), known as John Neeskens, is an American professional soccer player who plays as a center-back or left-back.

== Career ==
Born in Tulsa, Oklahoma, Neeskens began playing soccer with local PB Anguera and Damm, going on to have spells with Villarreal, Sant Andreu, and Badalona. He moved to American club Colorado Rapids in 2014 and made his professional debut versus Chicago Fire on June 5.

He was released just before the start of the 2015 Major League Soccer season. On September 17, 2015, Neeskens signed with the New York Cosmos's B-team.

Neeskens joined LA Galaxy II on March 14, 2016. After a short stay and limited minutes with LA Galaxy II, he joined Segunda División B club CF Gava on July 9, 2016.

Neeskens played for F.C. Santboià, starting with the 2017–18 season.

Before 2019–20 season, he joined former Slovak champions AS Trenčín. He only featured twice in league play and once in cup play. He scored a goal in his second league appearance against Senica, utilizing a pass from Gino van Kessel. Trenčín lost the match 3–2.

== Personal life ==
Media outlets often erroneously report that John Neeskens is the son of former Dutch international Johan Neeskens. In November 2010, Johan Neeskens stated via his personal website that John Neeskens was not his son. However, John has always maintained that Johan is his father, even reciting childhood memories about him.

Through his birth and ancestry, he holds American, Spanish, and Dutch citizenship.

== Honors ==
New York Cosmos B

- National Premier Soccer League: 2015
