= Independence High School (Independence, Ohio) =

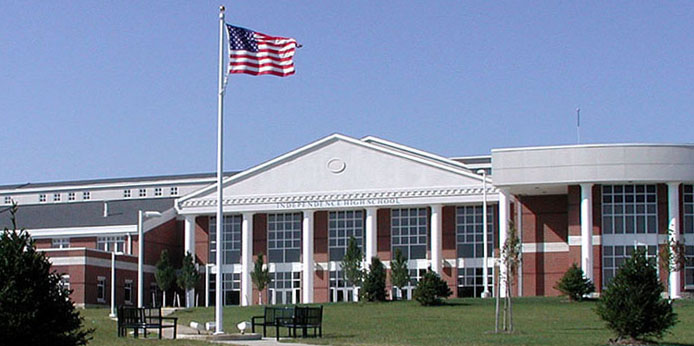

Location
- 6001 Archwood Road; Independence, (Cuyahoga County), Ohio 44131; United States
- Coordinates: 41°22′27″N 81°38′56″W

Information
- Type: Public, Coeducational high school
- Motto: "Freedom To Excel" & "I-Pride"
- Established: 1922
- Principal: James Hogue
- Faculty: 34
- Teaching staff: 22.08 (FTE)
- Grades: 9-12
- Student to teacher ratio: 13.99
- Colors: Royal Blue & Gold
- Athletics conference: Chagrin Valley Conference
- Team name: Blue Devils
- Newspaper: The Spectator
- Yearbook: The Eye
- Website: www.independence.k12.oh.us/o/ihs

Independence High School is a public high school located in Independence, Ohio, south of Cleveland. It is a part of the Independence Local School District. The school colors are blue and gold, and athletic teams are known as the Blue Devils.

== Summary ==
Located in Cuyahoga County, Independence High School is accredited as a four-year, comprehensive high school by the Ohio State Department of Education. The school year consists of two ninety-day semesters with four nine-week grading periods.

== Curriculum ==
The 2nd floor of Independence High School, home to the English, Math, Economics, and Social Studies departments.

College preparatory subjects are available within a broadly based program of studies. Special programs are available for gifted, learning-disabled, and at-risk students. Students may also participate in a number of vocational programs at Cuyahoga Valley Career Center. Also available are two computer labs and a library with computers all linked to a student server. Technology is routinely integrated into all academic disciplines through the use of document cameras, over-head projectors, smart boards, and Power Point presentations.

== Facilities ==
Main gymnasium

A shared use facility was completed in 2004-2005 in conjunction with the City of Independence. The building includes a cafeteria built to accommodate up to 3,000 people, a 1,200-seat auditorium with an orchestra pit and fly system, a 1,200-seat, 11,900 square feet (1,110 m^{2}) gymnasium built to collegiate basketball standards, a 46-seat lecture hall, and a media center with a 75-person conference room.

== State championships ==
- Boys track and field - 1948
- Boys cross country - 2009, 2010
- Girls golf - 2017
