= Philadelphia Barrage =

Defunct MLL lacrosse team in Pennsylvania

- Founded: 2001
- Folded: 2020
- League: Major League Lacrosse
- Based in: Philadelphia, Pennsylvania
- Colors: Orange, navy blue, white
- Head coach: Spencer Ford
- Championships: 3 (2004, 2006, 2007)
- Division titles: 2 (2006, 2007)
- Local media: The Philadelphia Inquirer
- Formerly: Bridgeport Barrage; 2001–2003

The Philadelphia Barrage were a professional field lacrosse team that are based in Philadelphia, Pennsylvania, and member of Major League Lacrosse. They were the Bridgeport Barrage from 2001 to 2003 at The Ballpark at Harbor Yard in Bridgeport, Connecticut. The team then relocated to Philadelphia from the 2004 season to the 2007 season when they became a traveling team for 2008. They ceased operations before the 2009 season due to the 2008 financial crisis and the Great Recession. The Philadelphia Barrage were resurrected for the 2020 season.

== Franchise history ==
The team played in Bridgeport, Connecticut from the 2001 to the 2003 season and relocated to the Philadelphia suburb of Villanova in 2004. From their initial move to Philadelphia, for the 2004 season, through the 2006 season, they played at Villanova Stadium, which is located on the campus of Villanova University. They had previously played at The Ballpark at Harbor Yard in Bridgeport where they hosted the inaugural Major League Lacrosse All Star Game in 2001. The Barrage made the playoffs for the first time in 2004 and won the Major League Lacrosse Championship over the Boston Cannons. The Barrage, after winning their 1st Eastern Conference Title, once again made the playoffs and won the Major League Lacrosse Championship in 2006 over the Denver Outlaws. For the 2007 season, the team moved to the United Sports Training Center in West Bradford Township, Pennsylvania. The Barrage, after winning their 2nd Eastern Conference Title, once again made the playoffs and won the Major League Lacrosse Championship in 2007 over the Los Angeles Riptide. The Barrage become the first team in MLL History to win back to back Steinfield Cup titles by winning the championship in 2006 and 2007.

After subsequent months of rumors, about the status and financial health of the franchise in 2007, Major League Lacrosse assumed operational control of the franchise in 2008. The Barrage played the full 2008 season as a travel team with their designated home games at league promotional sites outside of the Philadelphia area. The team folded before the 2009 season.

=== 2020: Revival ===
On February 17, 2020, MLL announced it was bringing back the Philadelphia Barrage after it folded the Atlanta Blaze the day before. The league named Blaze general manager Spencer Ford as the Barrage head coach. The team will operate under Mark Burdett, the league's Chief Revenue Officer.

The Barrage were not able to announce a new home venue before the COVID-19 pandemic affected the 2020 season, delaying their official return to Philadelphia until 2021. The team played its first game on July 18 in a quarantined Navy-Marine Corps Memorial Stadium against the Chesapeake Bayhawks. Despite getting out to a 3–0 lead, the team lost in its first game since 2008 by a score of 16–11 to the Bayhawks. On July 20, in third try, the Barrage won their first game since 2008, by a 14–10 score over the new Connecticut Hammerheads. With a 12–11 comeback win in their last game against the New York Lizards, the Barrage finished their comeback season 2–3, which was not good enough for a playoff berth.

=== Retirement ===
On December 16, 2020, the MLL-PLL merger was announced. This would bring both major American field lacrosse leagues, Major League Lacrosse and Premier Lacrosse League, together as one entity under the PLL banner. Only the Boston Cannons, rebranded to Cannons Lacrosse Club, would continue to exist through the merger. The rest of the MLL franchises, including the Barrage, would be retired. The PLL does have the option to use the folded franchises' likeness in an expansion.

== Roster ==
2020 Philadelphia Barrage
#	Name	Nationality	Position	Height	Weight	College
1	P.T. Ricci	(United States)	D	5 ft 11 in	185 lb	Loyola
2	Colin Minicus	(United States)	A	5 ft 11 in	160 lb	Amherst
3	Alex Woodall	(United States)	FO	6 ft 0 in	215 lb	Towson
5	Carlson Milikin	(United States)	SSDM	6 ft 0 in	195 lb	Notre Dame
9	Tim Barber	(United States)	M	5 ft 10 in	194 lb	Syracuse
11	Chris Madalon (A)	(United States)	G	6 ft 3 in	210 lb	North Carolina
12	James Wittmeyer	(United States)	A	6 ft 2 in	202 lb	Mercyhurst
13	Kyle Marr	(United States)	A	5 ft 11 in	185 lb	Johns Hopkins
15	Brett Craig	(Canada)	LSM	6 ft 6 in	245 lb	Seton Hill
16	Kevin Fox	(United States)	LSM	5 ft 9 in	170 lb	Penn State
17	Ryan MacSpayden	(Canada)	M	6 ft 1 in	180 lb	Mercy
21	Liam Byrnes (C)	(United States)	D	6 ft 3 in	195 lb	Marquette
22	Jon Mazza	(United States)	M	6 ft 4 in	207 lb	Towson
24	Brendan Sunday	(United States)	A	6 ft 5 in	200 lb	Towson
30	William Nowesnick	(United States)	D	6 ft 6 in	240 lb	Salisbury
31	Chad Toliver	(United States)	SSDM	5 ft 11 in	198 lb	Rutgers
32	Shayne Jackson (A)	(Canada)	A	5 ft 9 in	175 lb	Limestone
33	Matt Whitcher	(United States)	SSDM	6 ft 3 in	200 lb	York (PA)
34	Shane Doss	(United States)	G	5 ft 11 in	167 lb	Notre Dame
40	Eddie Bouhall	(United States)	D	6 ft 0 in	200 lb	Lehigh
41	Mark Evanchick	(United States)	D	5 ft 11 in	210 lb	Penn
42	Mark Matthews (A)	(Canada)	A	6 ft 5 in	230 lb	Denver
43	Tyson Gibson	(Canada)	M	6 ft 1 in	188 lb	Robert Morris
45	Anthony Joaquim	(Canada)	M	6 ft 2 in	215 lb	St. Joseph's
84	Tommy Palasek (A)	(United States)	A	5 ft 11 in	185 lb	Syracuse

(C)- captain

(A)- alternate captain

== Season-by-season ==
Philadelphia Barrage
Year	W	L	Regular season finish	Playoffs
Bridgeport Barrage
2001	3	11	3rd in American Division	---
2002	3	11	3rd in American Division	---
2003	1	11	3rd in American Division	---
Philadelphia Barrage
2004	7	5	2nd in American Division	Won semifinal 18–17 (OT) over Rattlers; Won championship 13–11 over Cannons
2005	4	8	3rd in American Division	---
2006	10	2	1st in Eastern Conference	Won semifinal 17–12 over Cannons; Won championship 23–12 over Outlaws
2007	9	3	1st in Eastern Conference	Won semifinal 13–12 (OT) over Outlaws; Won championship 16–13 over Riptide
2008	7	5	2nd in Eastern Conference	Lost semifinal 16–15 (OT) to Rattlers
2009— 2019	Did not play
2020	2	3	5th in League	---
Totals	46	59	Regular season win % = .438	Total playoff record 6 – 1 Playoff win % = 0.857

== Game-by-game ==
- 2001 Bridgeport Barrage season
- 2002 Bridgeport Barrage season
- 2003 Bridgeport Barrage season
- 2004 Philadelphia Barrage season
- 2005 Philadelphia Barrage season
- 2006 Philadelphia Barrage season
- 2007 Philadelphia Barrage season
- 2008 Philadelphia Barrage season

2020 Philadelphia Barrage season
Game	Location	Date	Opponent	Result
1	Navy–Marine Corps Memorial Stadium	July 18, 2020	Bayhawks	L 11–16
2	Navy–Marine Corps Memorial Stadium	July 19, 2020	Outlaws	L 10–15
3	Navy–Marine Corps Memorial Stadium	July 20, 2020	Hammerheads	W 14–10
4	Navy–Marine Corps Memorial Stadium	July 21, 2020	Cannons	L 10–12
5	Navy–Marine Corps Memorial Stadium	July 23, 2020	Lizards	W 12–11

== Coaches and others ==
Coaches:

- Ted Garber 2001: (3–11)
- Sal LoCascio 2002–2004: (11–27)
- Tony Resch 2005–2008: (30–18)
- Spencer Ford 2020: (2–3)

General Managers:

- Ken Paul 2001–2002
- Trey Reeder 2003–2004
- Keith Mecca 2005–2007

== See also ==
- Lacrosse in Pennsylvania
