= Mark Evanchick =

American lacrosse player

Mark Evanchick (born September 17, 1997) is an American field lacrosse defenseman. He currently plays for the Philadelphia Barrage of Major League Lacrosse. He was the franchise's first draft pick since returning to Philadelphia in 2020.

== Early life ==
Evanchick was born to Christine and Joseph Evanchick in Darien, Connecticut. He attended Darien High School. He was the captain of both the football and lacrosse teams. In football, he was a part of a state championship team for Darien in the Class LL in 2015. He was also named the Gatorade Player of the Year for the State of Connecticut. He was also named Connecticut Player of the year twice in the sport of lacrosse.

== Collegiate career ==
Evanchick was a two-sport athlete the University of Pennsylvania, in football and lacrosse, though he only appeared in one game on the football team. In lacrosse, he was First-team All-Ivy as a sophomore in 2018. In 2019, he was Third-team USILA All-American, First-team All-Ivy and First-team ECAC All-Star. That year, Penn lost to Yale in the NCAA Lacrosse Tournament.

In 2020, he started all five games the team played. The season was shortened due to the COVID-19 pandemic.

== Professional career ==
Evanchick was selected with the 9th overall pick by the Philadelphia Barrage in the 2020 MLL Collegiate Draft. He signed with the team shortly after.
