= United Sports =

Sports complex in West Bradford Township, Pennsylvania, USA

Coordinates: 39.9811°N 75.7379°W

- Interactive map of United Sports
- Former names: United Sports Training Center (1999–2009)
- Address: 1426 Marshallton-Thorndale Road, Downingtown, PA 19335
- Location: West Bradford Township, PA
- Owner: Ted van Beuren
- Operator: Eastern Sports Management
- Capacity: 1,200 (Outdoor); 150 (Indoor)

Construction
- Opened: 1999
- Renovated: 2008
- Cost: $15 million

Tenants
- FC Delco (USYSA) (1999–present); Philadelphia Pirates (WPSL) (2005); Philadelphia Barrage (MLL) (2007); Philadelphia Wings (NLL) (2005–08)^{1} Philadelphia Independence (WPS) (2009–11)^{1} (1: Training/exhibition home only)

United Sports (formerly known as United Sports Training Center) is a multiple-use sports complex located in West Bradford Township, Pennsylvania. The indoor venue consists of one boarded court, two boarded turf fields, and a large field house. In addition, the outdoor venue consists of four turf fields and seven grass fields. The main turf stadium seats 1,200. United Sports' outdoor facility currently plays host to youth soccer clubs FC Delco and Penn Fusion, which has produced players such as Ben Olsen, Jeff Parke, Jeff Larentowicz, Keegan Rosenberry, and Anthony Fontana among others. United Sports previously hosted the practices and training camps of the Philadelphia Wings of the National Lacrosse League and the Philadelphia Independence of Women's Professional Soccer, and was formerly home to the Philadelphia Barrage of Major League Lacrosse and the Philadelphia Pirates of the Women's Premier Soccer League.
