= Cawley Memorial Stadium =

Stadium in Lowell, Massachusetts

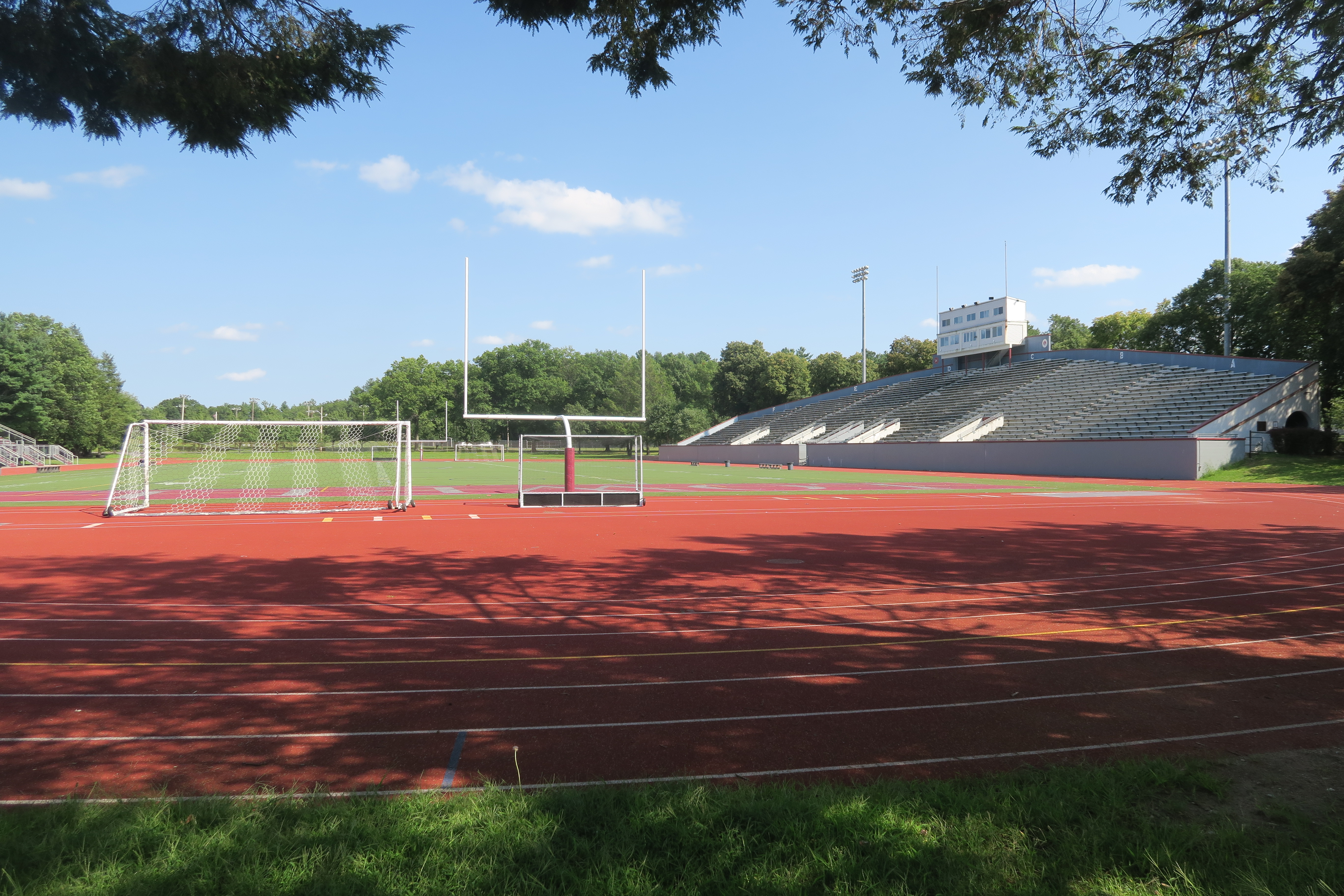
- Interactive map of Cawley Memorial Stadium
- Location: 428 Douglas Rd, Lowell, Massachusetts
- Coordinates: 42°38′0.32″N 71°16′36.02″W
- Owner: Lowell, Massachusetts
- Operator: Lowell High School
- Capacity: 6,000
- Surface: Field Turf
- Scoreboard: Yes

Tenants
- Boston Cannons (MLL) (2001–2003); Greater Lowell United FC (NPSL) (2014–present)

Cawley Memorial Stadium is a 6,000-seat multipurpose stadium in Lowell, Massachusetts primarily used for football, soccer, field hockey, track and field and lacrosse. The stadium was named after Edward Cawley, a landowner who owned several plots of land near the stadium on which the complex sits. The City of Lowell has always controlled this facility.

The stadium is the home field for Lowell High School teams, and for the Lowell Nor'easter of the New England Football League. The stadium was used from 2006-2014 for the Massachusetts Instrumental and Choral Conductors Association State Finals for marching band. The Boston Cannons of Major League Lacrosse used it from their creation in 2001 through 2003 as their home field. The New England Patriots (the Boston Patriots at the time) played a part of their inaugural season at the stadium. (Patriots founder Bill Sullivan was a graduate and later Distinguished Alumni of Lowell High School.)

The stadium was constructed in 1937 as a WPA project. In 1998, the facility was improved with new visitor bleachers and cosmetic improvements to the home side. During the summer of 2006, the grass of the playing field was replaced with Field Turf.

Preceded by First Stadium	Home of the Boston Cannons; 2001-2003 and the Greater Lowell United FC; 2014-Present	Succeeded by Nickerson Field; 2004-2006
