= New York Cosmos B =

- Full name: New York Cosmos B
- Founded: 2015; 10 years ago
- Dissolved: 2019; 6 years ago
- Stadium: Rocco B. Commisso Soccer Stadium
- Capacity: 3,500
- Owner: New York Cosmos
- Chairman: Rocco B. Commisso
- Head Coach: Carlos Mendes
- League: National Premier Soccer League
- 2019: Northeast Region, North Atlantic Conference: 1st Playoffs: Runners-up
Home colors	Away colors

New York Cosmos B were an American soccer team based in the New York metropolitan area that played in the National Premier Soccer League, the fourth tier of the United States soccer league system, as the reserve team of New York Cosmos.

== History ==
The club was announced on January 15, 2015. On February 10, 2015, Alecko Eskandarian, assistant coach for the senior squad, was named head coach of Cosmos B.

In the club's inaugural season, Cosmos B did not lose a game. On August 8, Cosmos B capped the undefeated season by defeating Chattanooga FC 3–2 at Finley Stadium to win the NPSL national championship. Following the successful season, then-Cosmos Chief Operating Officer Erik Stover stated that while the team was eligible for the U.S. Open Cup, since a new tournament rule at the time only barred professional teams that were majority owned by a higher-level professional league teams from taking part in the competition and not amateur ones, it would not take part and explained that "the integrity of the tournament is more important."

On February 2, 2016, Fernando Barboto was named head coach of Cosmos B. He was replaced by Kevin Anderson for the 2017 season

Following the cancellation of the 2018 NASL season and subsequent lawsuit between the league and the USSF, the New York Cosmos main team went on hiatus while fielding Cosmos B in the NPSL and exploring options for the 2019 season. In the interim, the team named former Cosmos team captain Carlos Mendes as team captain and moved some of the main team's players over to Cosmos B.

With no first team, the group began seeking a berth into the 2018 Lamar Hunt U.S. Open Cup but was originally not permitted to compete in the competition. This was due to the fact that the B hadn't finished the 2017 season in a high enough position to be allocated a spot while the first team had neither a professional league to play in and had been league-less at the deadline set by U.S. Soccer. Following an appeal, Cosmos B was allowed to enter through a play-in round with the Jacksonville Armada FC and Miami FC 2. The team fell to the Brooklyn Italians, 3–2, in the play-in round on May 6, 2018.

On December 13, 2019, the New York Cosmos announced that the team had been admitted into the National Independent Soccer Association for the Fall 2020 season. With the first team playing again, the B team withdrew from the NPSL and was dissolved. Although the Cosmos B had automatically qualified for the 2020 U.S. Open Cup due to its appearance in the NPSL final, no Cosmos team would participate in the tournament.

== Record ==
=== Year-by-year ===
Year	League	Regular season	Playoffs	U.S. Open Cup	Avg. attendance
2015	NPSL	1st, North Atlantic Conference	Champions	Did not enter	—
2016	NPSL	1st, North Atlantic Conference	Regional semifinal	Did not enter	—
2017	NPSL	4th, Atlantic Blue Conference	Did not qualify	Did not enter	—
2018	NPSL	1st, North Atlantic Conference	Regional Final	Play-in round	—
2019	NPSL	1st, North Atlantic Conference	Runner-up	Second Round	—

== Honors ==
=== League ===
Honor		Champions	Runners-up
NPSL	National Final	2015	2019
NPSL	Northeast Region	2015, 2019	2018
NPSL	North Atlantic Conference	2015, 2016, 2018, 2019	

== See also ==
- Soccer in New York City
