= The Ballpark at Harbor Yard =

Ballpark in Bridgeport, Connecticut

- Harbor Yard

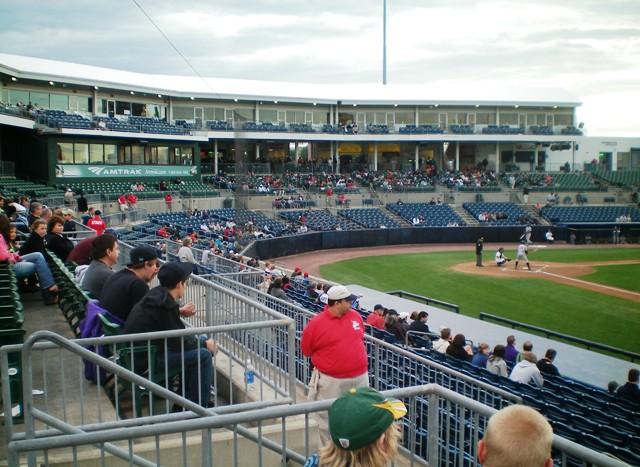
- Ballpark interior in 2009
- Interactive map of The Ballpark at Harbor Yard
- Location: 500 Main Street; Bridgeport, Connecticut 06604
- Coordinates: 41°10′19″N 73°11′15″W
- Owner: City of Bridgeport
- Operator: Bridgeport Bluefish
- Capacity: 5,500
- Surface: grass
- Field size: Left field: 325 feet (99 m); Center field: 405 feet (123 m); Right field: 325 feet (99 m)
- Public transit: Bridgeport

Construction
- Opened: May 21, 1998
- Closed: September 17, 2017
- Cost: $19 million

Tenants
- Bridgeport Bluefish (ALPB) 1998–2017; Bridgeport Barrage (MLL) 2001–2003; Sacred Heart Pioneers (NCAA) 2001–2017; Bridgeport Purple Knights (NCAA) 1998–2017

Website
- web.archive.org/web/20160303212623/http://bridgeportbluefish.com/stadium

The Ballpark at Harbor Yard was a 5,500-seat independent-league ballpark in downtown Bridgeport, Connecticut that opened on May 21, 1998. The stadium was located next to the Webster Bank Arena, now known as the Total Mortgage Arena. It was named "Harbor Yard" as an allusion to Oriole Park at Camden Yards in Baltimore, Maryland.

Located on Bridgeport's Long Island Sound waterfront, Harbor Yard was encircled by Interstate 95 and the Northeast Corridor rail line. The site had navigable ingress and egress routes to northern Fairfield County and the Naugatuck River Valley via the 8/25 connector. The city chose not to renew its lease to the Bluefish and closed the stadium after the 2017 baseball season. The venue has been converted to an outdoor concert amphitheater known as Hartford HealthCare Amphitheater.

== History ==
The Ballpark at Harbor Yard opened on May 21, 1998, on the site of the former Jenkins Valve factory. The demolition of the Pequonnock apartment buildings in 2002 improved the parking situation for fans attending games at the Ballpark. The Ballpark and Total Mortgage Arena are credited for revitalizing the city into a prosperous waterfront attraction and destination.

The Ballpark at Harbor Yard was constructed in between 1997 and 1998, and its $19 million price tag was funded through public and team contributions. It had a seating capacity of 5,500. Believing that Harbor Yard would be one of the important pieces of Bridgeport's renewal, team co-founder, Jack McGregor, chose its name as an allusion to Baltimore's renewal of the Camden Yards neighborhood.

Harbor Yard was the home field of the Bridgeport Barrage of Major League Lacrosse from 2001 to 2003. The Barrage relocated to Philadelphia after the 2003 season.

On October 1, 2009, the Atlantic League of Professional Baseball granted the ballpark the 2009 Atlantic League Park of the Year award.

On August 8, 2017, Mayor Joe Ganim announced that city would not renew the Bluefish's lease, ending their 20-year stint at the ballpark at the end of the 2017 season. The Bluefish played their final home game at the park on September 17, 2017, losing by a score of 9–2 to the Somerset Patriots.

The former minor-league ballpark was converted to a concert amphitheater known as Hartford HealthCare Amphitheater. A groundbreaking ceremony for the replacement amphitheater was held in July 2018. The amphitheater opened July 28, 2021.

=== All-Star Games ===
The Ballpark at Harbor Yard hosted four All-Star games in its history: the first MLL All-Star Game in 2001, and the 1999, 2006 and 2015 Atlantic League All Star games.

== Attractions ==
The park had concessions with traditional ballpark fare served at two restaurants: the People's Bank Marina, an all-you-can-eat buffet; and the Harbor Club, a restaurant that served an upscale ballpark menu.

Children at the ballpark could play on the playground equipment at the United Way Kids' Cove. There was also a party suite was for birthday parties and other special occasions.

The Bluefish added the Two Roads Beer Garden for the 2015 season, sponsored by the Two Roads Brewery from Stratford.

== See also ==
- List of NCAA Division I baseball venues
