= Los Angeles Riptide =

American professional lacrosse team

- Founded: 2005
- Folded: 2008
- League: MLL
- Conference: Western
- Based in: Carson, California
- Stadium: The Home Depot Center Track and Field Facility
- Colors: Teal, Orange, Black, Gray, White
- Head coach: John Tucker
- General manager: G. W. Mix
- Division titles: 1 (2007)
- Local media: Los Angeles Times; KLAC

The Los Angeles Riptide were a professional lacrosse team based in the Greater Los Angeles area. From 2006 to 2008, they played in Major League Lacrosse and ceased operations before the 2009 season.

== Franchise history ==
In March 2005, MLL announced that Los Angeles would receive the first of the planned four western expansion teams for the 2006 season.

The Riptide's ownership group was the Anschutz Entertainment Group. This group also owns and operates the NHL's Los Angeles Kings, their minor-league affiliates the Manchester Monarchs and Reading Royals and MLS Los Angeles Galaxy.

The first Los Angeles Ripide player was Michael Watson, who was selected with the top pick in the 2006 MLL expansion draft.

== Season-by-season ==
Los Angeles Riptide
Year	W	L	Regular season finish	Playoffs
2006	6	6	3rd in Western Conference	–
2007	9	3	1st in Western Conference	Won semifinal 15–14 over Rattlers; Lost championship 16–13 to Barrage
2008	7	5	2nd in Western Conference	Lost semifinal 13–12 to Outlaws
Totals	22	14	Regular Season Win % = .611	Total Playoff Record 1–2; Playoff Win % = .333

== Coaches and others ==
- Head coach – John Tucker
- Assistant coach – Mike Allan
- Assistant coach – Shawn Trell
- Head Athletic Trainer – Paul Lacanilao
- Team Physician – Dr. Luga Podesta, M.D.
- Equipment Manager – Brian Eisenberg
- Team Administrator – Shant Kasparian
