= Mitchel Athletic Complex =

Stadium in Uniondale, New York

Coordinates: 40°43′26.40″N 73°35′50″W

Mitchel Athletic Complex Stadium
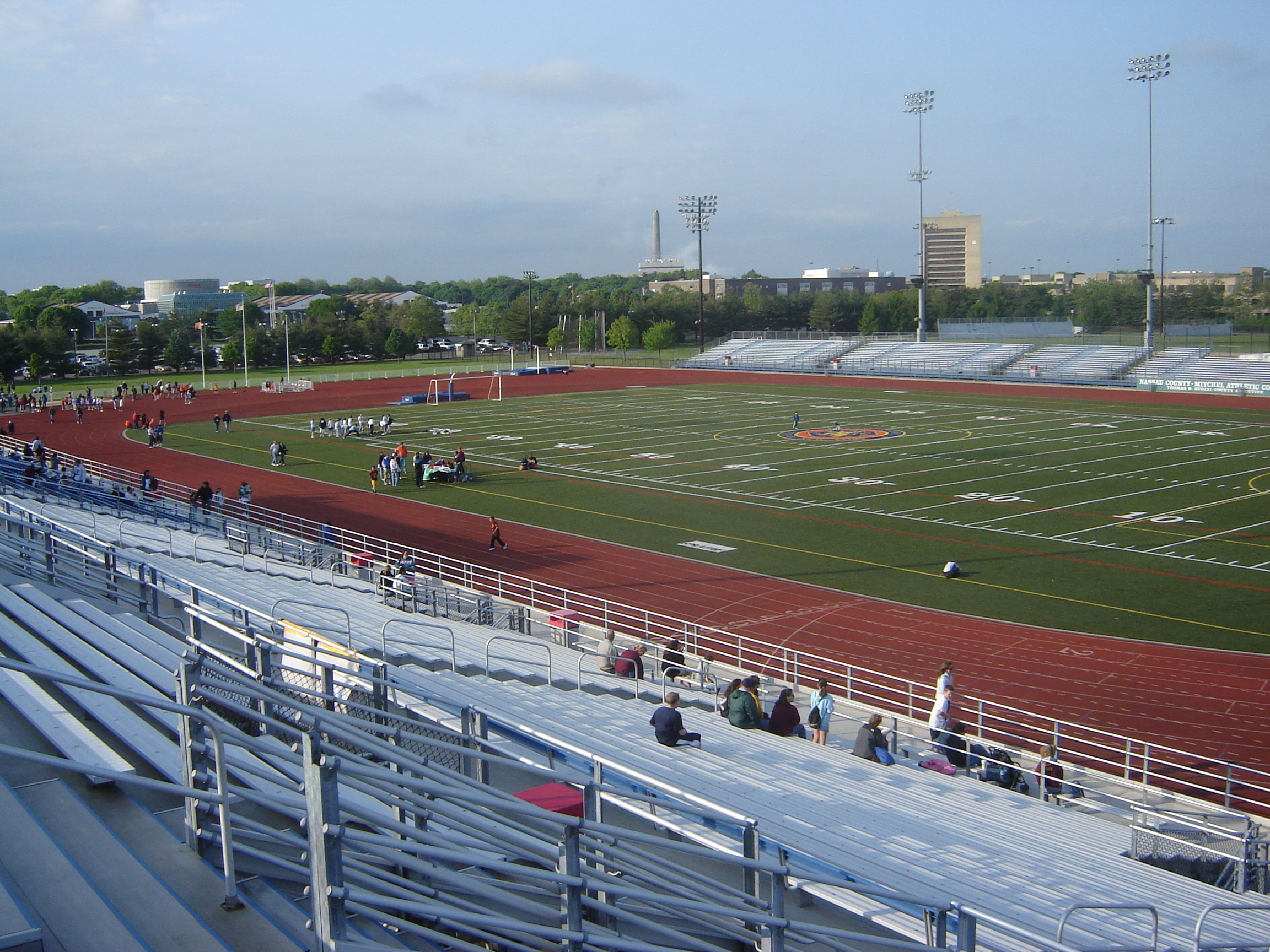
- Interactive map of Mitchel Athletic Complex Stadium
- Address: 1 Charles Lindbergh Blvd, Uniondale, New York 11553; East Garden City; United States
- Owner: Nassau County
- Capacity: 10,102
- Type: Sporting

Construction
- Opened: 1984
- Renovated: 1997

The Mitchel Athletic Complex is part of the Mitchel Field complex, located in the East Garden City section of Uniondale, New York, on the site of the decommissioned Mitchel Air Force Base. The facility is owned by Nassau County. It is used mostly for football and soccer and also sometimes for athletics. The athletic complex was built in 1984 and was renovated in 1997; it hosted track and field and soccer events during the 1998 Goodwill Games. Mitchel Field is also home to Nassau Coliseum, Nassau Community College, Hofstra University, Lockheed Corporation, and the Cradle of Aviation Museum.

== Description ==
In 2000, the Mitchel Athletic Complex hosted two matches of the 2000 Lamar Hunt U.S. Open Cup. A third round match between the Tampa Bay Mutiny and the MetroStars, now the New York Red Bulls, of Major League Soccer and a semi-final match between the Miami Fusion and the MetroStars with the MetroStars falling in the semi-final. In 2002, the Complex hosted a quarter-final match of the 2002 Lamar Hunt U.S. Open Cup between the Columbus Crew and the MetroStars.

Mitchel Athletic Complex (also called Mitchel Park and Mitchel Field) was the home to the Long Island Lizards of Major League Lacrosse. The 2003 Major League Lacrosse All-Star Game was held at Mitchel. It was also home to the New York Power of the former Women's United Soccer Association. The soccer club Long Island Rough Riders also used the Mitchel Athletic Complex Stadium for home games. The current seating capacity is 10,102.

One of the hangars of the Complex was the practice facility for the New York Dragons of the Arena Football League. The team played their games at the Nassau Veterans Memorial Coliseum, on another part of Mitchel Field.

In 2013, the New York Cosmos opened a new practice facility for the team with remodeled soccer fields within the large site, and in 2019 the club announced that they would play their regular-season games at the complex.

== See also ==
- Eisenhower Park
