= 2017 NPSL season =

National Premier Soccer League
- Season: 2017
- Champions: Elm City Express (1st Title)
- Regular Season Champions: Miami Fusion FC (1st Title)
- Matches: 571
- Goals: 2,101 (3.68 per match)
- Best player: (United States) Jade Johnson (Dakota Fusion FC)
- Top goalscorer: (United States) Alessandro Canale (Jamaica) Amani Walker (Albion SC Pros) (18 Goals Each)
- Best goalkeeper: (United States) Andrew Weber (FC Arizona)

The 2017 NPSL season was the 105th season of FIFA-sanctioned soccer in the United States and the 15th season of the National Premier Soccer League.

== Regions and conferences ==
Locations of NPSL clubs for 2017. Blue = Northeast Region clubs, Yellow = South Region clubs, Green = Midwest Region clubs, Red = West Region clubs

== Changes from 2016 ==
=== Incoming teams ===
The following expansion clubs were announced for the 2017 NPSL season:

Team	Location	Reference
Asheville City SC	Asheville, NC	Expansion
Beaches FC	Jupiter, FL	Expansion
Boca Raton FC	Boca Raton, FL	Joined from APSL
City of Angels FC	Los Angeles, CA	Expansion
Dakota Fusion FC	Fargo, ND	Expansion
Duluth FC	Duluth, MN	Joined from American Premier League
Elm City Express	New Haven, CT	Expansion
FC Arizona	Mesa, AZ	Expansion
Fort Pitt Regiment	Pittsburgh, PA	Return from hiatus
Greater Lowell NPSL FC	Lowell, MA	Acquired the right to play in NPSL from Greater Lowell United FC after that team departed for CSL USA
Hartford City FC	Hartford, CT	Expansion
Inter Nashville FC	Nashville, TN	Expansion
Kitsap SC	Bremerton, WA	Joined from PDL
Midland-Odessa FC	Midland, TX	Joined from PDL
Minneapolis City SC	Minneapolis, MN	Joined from PLA
Napa Valley 1839 FC	Napa, CA	Expansion
Naples United FC	Naples, FL	Expansion
Orange County FC	South Orange County, CA	Expansion
Oxnard Guerreros FC	Oxnard, CA	Expansion
Ozark FC	Springdale, AR	Expansion
PDX FC	Portland, OR	Expansion
Pierce County FC	Pierce County, WA	Expansion
Med City FC	Rochester, MN	Expansion
Sioux Falls Thunder FC	Sioux Falls, SD	Expansion
Spokane SC Shadow	Spokane, WA	Joined from PDL
Syracuse FC	Syracuse, NY	Expansion
TSF FC	Wayne, NJ	Expansion
Tyler FC	Tyler, TX	Expansion
VSLT FC	St Paul, MN	Expansion
West Chester United SC	West Chester, PA	Expansion

=== Moved and/or rebranded teams ===
Team	Location	Former name
Rochester Lancers	Rochester, New York	Rochester River Dogz

=== Outgoing teams ===
Team	Location	Notes
ASA Charge	Gambrills, Maryland	Will not return
Carolina RailHawks NPSL	Cary, North Carolina	Will not return
Chicago Mustangs	Chicago, Illinois	Will not return after being provisional member
Corinthians FC of San Antonio	San Antonio, Texas	Will not return
FC Hasental	Thousand Oaks, California	Joined UPSL
Fort Lauderdale Strikers U-23s	Fort Lauderdale, Florida	Will not return
Greater Lowell United FC	Lowell, Massachusetts	Joined CSL USA
Liverpool Warriors	Dallas, Texas	Will not return
Myrtle Beach FC	Myrtle Beach, South Carolina	Joined PDL
Nashville FC	Nashville, Tennessee	Dissolved
North County Battalion	San Diego, California	Joined PDL
Real San Jose	San Jose, California	Joined UPSL
Richmond Strikers	Richmond, Virginia	Will not return
Storm FC	Pembroke Pines, Florida	On hiatus
Tampa Bay Rowdies 2	Tampa, Florida	Will not return
Tobacco Road FC	Durham, North Carolina	Joined PDL
Weston FC	Weston, Florida	Joined PDL

=== Conference realignments ===
There were a number of conferences realigned for the 2017 season. In the South Region the South Atlantic Conference was eliminated and the South Central Conference was split into the Lone Star and Heartland Conferences. In the Midwest Region, the expanded Central Conference was renamed the North Conference and the Great Lakes East and Great Lakes West Conferences were renamed the East and Great Lakes Conferences respectively.

== Personnel and sponsorship ==
Team	Head coach	Kit manufacturer	Shirt sponsor	Region - conference
Albion SC Pros	(United States) Ziggy Korytoski	Puma	Primos	West - Southwest
Asheville City SC	(United States) Richard Askey	Nike	Hi-Wire Brewing	South - Southeast
Brooklyn Italians	(United States) Dominic Casciato	Puma		Northeast - Atlantic
Boston City FC	(Brazil) Palhinha	Nike		Northeast - Atlantic
New York Cosmos B	(United States) Fernando Barboto	Under Armour	Emirates	Northeast - Atlantic
Elm City Express	(United States) Ted Haley	Adidas		Northeast - Atlantic
Chattanooga FC	(United States) Bill Elliott	Diadora	Volkswagen	South - Southeast
Dallas City FC	(United States) Ernesto Charles	Vove	Metro PCS	South - Heartland
Sacramento Gold	(Mexico) Ruben Mora Jr.	Gems	Unger Construction Co.	West - Golden Gate
FC Arizona	(Northern Ireland) Aidan Davison	Adidas	Commercial Properties Incorporated	West - Southwest
Georgia Revolution FC	(United States) Chris Mahaffey	Joma	Eagle's Landing Family Practice	South - Southeast
Hartford City FC	(United States) Christian Benjamin	Hummel	Armstrong Rockwell	Northeast - Atlantic
Kingston Stockade FC	(United States) David Lindholm	Inaria	Trailways	Northeast - Atlantic
Napa Valley 1839 FC	(Mexico) Jesus Medina	Adidas	Del Sur Mortgage	West - Golden Gate
Orange County FC	(United States) Paul Caligiuri	Lotto	Permaseal Tire sealant	West - Southwest
SoCal SC	(Italy) Daniel Musatti	Hummel		West - Southwest
Temecula FC	(Scotland) Willie Donachie	Admiral	Quail Real Estate	West - Southwest
Detroit City FC	(United States) Ben Pirmann	Adidas	Metro Detroit Chevy Dealers Local Marketing Association	Midwest - Great Lakes
Midland-Odessa FC	(United States) Matt Barnes	Under Armour	Oxy	South - Lone Star

== Standings ==
=== Northeast Region ===
==== Atlantic Blue Conference ====
Pos	Team	Pld	W	L	T	GF	GA	GD	Pts	Qualification
1	Elm City Express	12	9	1	2	27	5	+22	29	2017 NPSL Atlantic Blue Conference playoffs
2	Brooklyn Italians	12	9	2	1	20	7	+13	28	2017 NPSL Atlantic Blue Conference playoffs
3	TSF FC	12	7	3	2	24	14	+10	23	2017 NPSL Atlantic Blue Conference playoffs
4	New York Cosmos B	12	6	4	2	19	8	+11	20	
5	Seacoast United Phantoms	12	3	8	1	11	26	−15	10	
6	Greater Lowell NPSL FC	12	2	10	0	8	37	−29	6	

Source: NPSL standings
Rules for classification: 1) points; 2) head-to-head; 3) goal differential in head-to-head results; 4) wins; 5) total goal differential; 6) fewest losses; 7) coin toss

==== Atlantic White Conference ====
Pos	Team	Pld	W	L	T	GF	GA	GD	Pts	Qualification
1	Kingston Stockade FC	12	7	4	1	30	16	+14	22	2017 NPSL Atlantic White Conference playoffs
2	Boston City FC	12	6	3	3	29	17	+12	21	2017 NPSL Atlantic White Conference playoffs
3	Hartford City FC	12	5	3	4	25	20	+5	19	2017 NPSL Atlantic White Conference playoffs
4	Rhode Island Reds	12	5	6	1	26	28	−2	16	
5	Seacoast United Mariners	12	2	9	1	13	35	−22	7	
6	New York Athletic Club	12	1	9	2	14	33	−19	5	

Source: NPSL standings
Rules for classification: 1) points; 2) head-to-head; 3) goal differential in head-to-head results; 4) wins; 5) total goal differential; 6) fewest losses; 7) coin toss

===== Atlantic White Conference top scorers =====
Rank	Player	Team	Goals
1	Isaac Nana Addai	Boston City FC	12
2	Pedro Espindola	Kingston Stockade FC	11
3	Fabrice Dogbey	Rhode Island Reds	9
4	Mateusz Koziol	Kingston Stockade FC	6
5	Luke Alvaro	Hartford City FC	5
5	Ronaldinho Diniz	Rhode Island Reds	5
5	Ryan Taylor	Hartford City FC	5
5	Laurin Vogel	New York Athletic Club	5
9	Eric Fortier	Kingston Stockade FC	4
9	Carlos Lopez	Seacoast United Mariners	4
9	Jhonata Mateusz Nasimento Batista	Boston City FC	4

As of July 16, 2017

==== Keystone Conference ====
Pos	Team	Pld	W	L	T	GF	GA	GD	Pts	Qualification
1	New Jersey Copa FC	10	7	1	2	24	13	+11	23	2017 NPSL Keystone Conference playoffs
2	Clarkstown SC Eagles	10	6	2	2	40	9	+31	20	2017 NPSL Keystone Conference playoffs
3	West Chester United SC	10	6	2	2	22	9	+13	20	2017 NPSL Keystone Conference playoffs
4	Electric City Shock SC	10	4	3	3	20	20	0	15	2017 NPSL Keystone Conference playoffs
5	Buxmont Torch FC	10	4	4	2	18	26	−8	14	
6	Junior Lone Star FC	10	4	5	1	26	26	0	13	
7	Hershey FC	10	3	7	0	26	39	−13	9	
8	GBFC Thunder	10	0	10	0	8	42	−34	0	

Source: NPSL standings
Rules for classification: 1) points; 2) head-to-head; 3) goal differential in head-to-head results; 4) wins; 5) total goal differential; 6) fewest losses; 7) coin toss

==== Mid-Atlantic Conference ====
Pos	Team	Pld	W	L	T	GF	GA	GD	Pts	Qualification
1	Virginia Beach City FC (Q)	6	3	0	3	8	4	+4	12	2017 NPSL Mid-Atlantic Conference playoffs
2	FC Frederick (Q)	6	4	2	0	9	6	+3	12	2017 NPSL Mid-Atlantic Conference playoffs
3	Fredericksburg FC (Q)	6	1	3	2	6	8	−2	5	2017 NPSL Mid-Atlantic Conference playoffs
4	Legacy 76 (C)	6	0	3	3	8	13	−5	3	2017 NPSL Mid-Atlantic Conference playoffs

Source: NPSL standings
Rules for classification: 1) points; 2) head-to-head; 3) goal differential in head-to-head results; 4) wins; 5) total goal differential; 6) fewest losses; 7) coin toss
(C) Champions; (Q) Qualified for the phase indicated

=== South Region ===
==== Southeast Conference ====
===== Southeast East Division =====
Pos	Team	Pld	W	L	T	GF	GA	GD	Pts	Qualification
1	Knoxville Force	12	7	3	2	31	21	+10	23	2017 NPSL Southeast Conference playoffs
2	Atlanta Silverbacks	12	6	4	2	24	13	+11	20	2017 NPSL Southeast Conference playoffs
3	Asheville City SC	12	3	3	6	20	21	−1	15	2017 NPSL Southeast Conference playoffs
4	FC Carolina Discoveries	12	1	8	3	12	33	−21	6	
5	Georgia Revolution	12	0	9	3	10	33	−23	3	

Source: NPSL standings
Rules for classification: 1) points; 2) head-to-head; 3) goal differential in head-to-head results; 4) wins; 5) total goal differential; 6) fewest losses; 7) coin toss

===== Southeast West Division =====
Pos	Team	Pld	W	L	T	GF	GA	GD	Pts	Qualification
1	New Orleans Jesters	12	8	0	4	28	12	+16	28	2017 NPSL Southeast Conference playoffs
2	Chattanooga FC	12	6	2	4	28	7	+21	22	2017 NPSL Southeast Conference playoffs
3	Inter Nashville FC	12	6	2	4	24	14	+10	22	2017 NPSL Southeast Conference playoffs
4	Memphis City FC	12	5	3	4	15	15	0	19	
5	Birmingham Hammers	12	1	9	2	11	34	−23	5	

Source: NPSL standings
Rules for classification: 1) points; 2) head-to-head; 3) goal differential in head-to-head results; 4) wins; 5) total goal differential; 6) fewest losses; 7) coin toss

==== Sunshine Conference ====
Pos	Team	Pld	W	L	T	GF	GA	GD	Pts	Qualification
1	Miami Fusion FC	12	11	1	0	33	12	+21	33	2017 NPSL South Region playoffs
2	Miami United FC	12	7	4	1	17	15	+2	22	
3	Jacksonville Armada U-23	12	6	4	2	31	17	+14	20	
4	Kraze United	11	6	5	0	21	23	−2	18	
5	Beaches FC	12	4	6	2	17	18	−1	14	
6	Boca Raton FC	12	3	9	0	14	34	−20	9	
7	Naples United FC	11	1	9	1	9	23	−14	4	

Updated to match(es) played on July 14, 2017. Source: NPSL standings
Rules for classification: 1) points; 2) head-to-head; 3) goal differential in head-to-head results; 4) wins; 5) total goal differential; 6) fewest losses; 7) coin toss

==== Lonestar Conference ====
Pos	Team	Pld	W	L	T	GF	GA	GD	Pts	Qualification
1	Fort Worth Vaqueros FC	10	7	2	1	17	8	+9	22	2017 NPSL Lone Star Conference playoffs
2	Houston Dutch Lions FC	10	6	1	3	27	18	+9	21	2017 NPSL Lone Star Conference playoffs
3	Midland-Odessa FC	10	7	3	0	24	12	+12	21	2017 NPSL Lone Star Conference playoffs
4	Shreveport Rafters FC	10	3	5	2	14	14	0	11	2017 NPSL Lone Star Conference playoffs
5	Houston Regals SCA	10	2	6	2	11	21	−10	8	
6	Tyler FC	10	0	8	2	6	26	−20	2	

Source: NPSL standings
Rules for classification: 1) points; 2) head-to-head; 3) goal differential in head-to-head results; 4) wins; 5) total goal differential; 6) fewest losses; 7) coin toss

==== Heartland Conference ====
Pos	Team	Pld	W	L	T	GF	GA	GD	Pts	Qualification
1	FC Wichita	10	8	1	1	27	11	+16	25	2017 NPSL Heartland Conference playoffs
2	Tulsa Athletic	10	5	4	1	25	16	+9	16	2017 NPSL Heartland Conference playoffs
3	Little Rock Rangers	10	4	2	4	17	14	+3	16	2017 NPSL Heartland Conference playoffs
4	Dallas City FC	10	4	5	1	16	18	−2	13	2017 NPSL Heartland Conference playoffs
5	Demize NPSL	10	3	6	1	18	20	−2	10	
6	Ozark FC	10	2	8	0	12	36	−24	6	

Source: NPSL standings
Rules for classification: 1) points; 2) head-to-head; 3) goal differential in head-to-head results; 4) wins; 5) total goal differential; 6) fewest losses; 7) coin toss

=== Midwest Region ===
==== East Conference ====
Pos	Team	Pld	W	L	T	GF	GA	GD	Pts	Qualification
1	Erie Commodores FC	12	6	3	3	17	11	+6	21	2017 NPSL Midwest Region playoffs
2	Dayton Dynamo	12	6	3	3	15	14	+1	21	2017 NPSL Midwest Region playoffs
3	Rochester Lancers	12	6	4	2	18	10	+8	20	
4	AFC Cleveland	12	6	5	1	21	15	+6	19	
5	FC Buffalo	12	5	4	3	22	18	+4	18	
6	Fort Pitt Regiment	12	3	8	1	9	19	−10	10	
7	Syracuse FC	12	2	7	3	8	23	−15	9	

Source: NPSL standings
Rules for classification: 1) points; 2) head-to-head; 3) goal differential in head-to-head results; 4) wins; 5) total goal differential; 6) fewest losses; 7) coin toss

==== Great Lakes Conference ====
Pos	Team	Pld	W	L	T	GF	GA	GD	Pts	Qualification
1	AFC Ann Arbor	14	12	1	1	33	9	+24	37	2017 NPSL Midwest Region playoffs
2	Detroit City FC	14	9	2	3	29	19	+10	30	2017 NPSL Midwest Region playoffs
3	Grand Rapids FC	14	6	6	2	26	21	+5	20	
4	Lansing United	14	6	7	1	27	24	+3	19	
5	Kalamazoo FC	14	5	6	3	22	23	−1	18	
6	Michigan Stars FC	14	3	5	6	26	30	−4	15	
7	Milwaukee Torrent	14	3	6	5	26	27	−1	14	
8	FC Indiana	14	1	12	1	16	52	−36	4	

Source: NPSL standings
Rules for classification: 1) points; 2) head-to-head; 3) goal differential in head-to-head results; 4) wins; 5) total goal differential; 6) fewest losses; 7) coin toss

==== North Conference ====
Pos	Team	Pld	W	L	T	GF	GA	GD	Pts	Qualification
1	Duluth FC	14	8	2	4	42	18	+24	28	2017 NPSL Midwest Region playoffs
2	Dakota Fusion FC	14	9	5	0	37	27	+10	27	2017 NPSL Midwest Region playoffs
3	Minneapolis City SC	14	8	5	1	31	16	+15	25	
4	Rochester Med City FC	14	7	3	4	23	16	+7	25	
5	Viejos Son Los Trapos FC	14	7	5	2	37	24	+13	23	
6	Minnesota TwinStars FC	14	5	7	2	33	33	0	17	
7	Sioux Falls Thunder FC	14	3	7	4	22	31	−9	13	
8	LC Aris FC	14	0	13	1	11	71	−60	1	

Source: NPSL standings
Rules for classification: 1) points; 2) head-to-head; 3) goal differential in head-to-head results; 4) wins; 5) total goal differential; 6) fewest losses; 7) coin toss

=== West Region ===
==== Northwest Conference ====
Pos	Team	Pld	W	L	T	GF	GA	GD	Pts	Qualification
1	Kitsap SC	10	6	2	2	17	12	+5	20	2016 NPSL West Region playoffs
2	FC Mulhouse Portland	10	6	4	0	17	14	+3	18	2016 NPSL West Region playoffs
3	PDX FC	10	5	4	1	17	15	+2	16	
4	Spokane SC Shadow	10	3	4	3	21	14	+7	12	
5	OSA FC	10	3	4	3	15	15	0	12	
6	Pierce County FC	10	1	6	3	14	31	−17	6	

Source: NPSL standings
Rules for classification: 1) points; 2) head-to-head; 3) goal differential in head-to-head results; 4) wins; 5) total goal differential; 6) fewest losses; 7) coin toss

==== Golden Gate Conference ====
Pos	Team	Pld	W	L	T	GF	GA	GD	Pts	Qualification
1	CD Aguiluchos USA	12	8	3	1	26	21	+5	25	2017 NPSL West Region playoffs
2	Sonoma County Sol	12	5	3	4	32	22	+10	19	2017 NPSL West Region playoffs
3	Sacramento Gold	12	4	3	5	25	18	+7	17	
4	East Bay FC Stompers	12	3	6	3	14	24	−10	12	
5	Napa Valley 1839 FC	12	1	6	5	13	25	−12	8	

Source: NPSL standings
Rules for classification: 1) points; 2) head-to-head; 3) goal differential in head-to-head results; 4) wins; 5) total goal differential; 6) fewest losses; 7) coin toss

==== Southwest Conference ====
Pos	Team	Pld	W	L	T	GF	GA	GD	Pts	Qualification
1	FC Arizona	16	12	0	4	47	3	+44	40	2017 NPSL West Region playoffs
2	Orange County FC	16	10	1	5	65	19	+46	35	2017 NPSL West Region playoffs
3	Riverside Coras	16	11	3	2	39	16	+23	35	2017 NPSL West Region playoffs
4	Albion SC Pros	16	11	4	1	46	18	+28	34	2017 NPSL West Region playoffs
5	SoCal SC	16	5	8	3	30	29	+1	18	
6	Temecula FC	16	5	8	3	23	35	−12	18	
7	Oxnard Guerreros FC	16	5	10	1	36	41	−5	16	
8	City of Angels FC	16	2	13	1	22	88	−66	7	
9	Sports Club Corinthians USA	16	0	14	2	11	70	−59	2	

Source: NPSL standings
Rules for classification: 1) points; 2) head-to-head; 3) goal differential in head-to-head results; 4) wins; 5) total goal differential; 6) fewest losses; 7) coin toss

== Playoffs ==
The format is as follows. All playoff seeding is based on points per game.

- West: The top 3 teams qualify from Southwest Conference. The top 2 teams qualify from Golden Gate Conference. The top 2 teams qualify from Northwest Conference. The top remaining team based on points per game in the region qualifies as a wildcard. The 3 conference champions are seeded 1-3. The wildcard team is seeded 8. The remaining teams are seeded 4-7. Each game will be hosted by the higher seed.
- Midwest: The top 2 teams from each conference qualify. The 3 conference champions are seeded 1-3. The 3 remaining teams are seeded 4-6. The region quarterfinals will be hosted by the higher seed. The semifinal and final will be a site to be determined.
- South: The 4 conference champions will be seeded based on points per game. Each game will be hosted by higher seed.
  - Heartland: The top 4 teams qualify and each game is hosted by higher seed.
  - Lone Star: The top 4 teams qualify and each game is hosted by higher seed.
  - Southeast: The top 3 teams from each division qualify. Each game is hosted by higher seed.
  - Sunshine: The top team qualifies directly to the region playoffs.
- Northeast: The 4 conference champions will be seeded based on points per game. Each game will be hosted by higher seed.
  - Atlantic Blue: The top 3 teams qualify and each game is hosted by higher seed.
  - Atlantic White: The top 3 teams qualify and each game is hosted by higher seed.
  - Keystone: The top 4 teams qualify and each game is hosted by higher seed.
  - Mid-Atlantic: All 4 teams qualify and are seeded based on the first 6 games of the regular season. Each game is hosted by higher seed.

=== Heartland Conference Playoffs ===
Semifinal; July 12
**1**	**FC Wichita**	**3**
4	Dallas City FC	2
**2**	**Tulsa Athletic**	**1**
3	Little Rock Rangers	0

Final; July 15
**1**	**FC Wichita**	**5**
2	Tulsa Athletic	1

Bold = winner
* = after extra time, ( ) = penalty shootout score

Heartland Conference Playoffs
July 12, 2017
7:15 PM CDT
Semifinals

FC Wichita	3–2	Dallas City FC
Clare 5'; Perez 53'; Tonzi 86'	Match Report	Deleon 26'; Alvarado 44'; Joya (yellow card) 49'; Okumu (yellow card) 86'

Stryker Soccer Complex
Wichita, Kansas
July 12, 2017
7:30 PM CDT
Semifinals

Tulsa Athletic	1–0	Little Rock Rangers
Garcia 83'; Gilbert (yellow card) 90'	Match Report

LaFortune Stadium
Tulsa, Oklahoma

July 15, 2017
7:15 PM CDT
Final

FC Wichita	5–1	Tulsa Athletic
Clare 4', 17', 77'; Corfe 16', 55'; Togbah (yellow card) 35'; Gomes (yellow card) 80'	Match Report	Morris (yellow card) 23'; Leung 27'; Navarro (yellow card) 44'; Vargas (yellow card) 65'

Stryker Soccer Complex
Wichita, Kansas

=== Lone Star Conference Playoffs ===
Semifinal; July 12
1	Fort Worth Vaqueros	2
**4**	**Shreveport Rafters FC**	**3**
2	Houston Dutch Lions FC	1
**3**	**Midland-Odessa FC**	**3**

Final; July 15
4	Shreveport Rafters FC	1
**3**	**Midland-Odessa FC**	**2**

Bold = winner
* = after extra time, ( ) = penalty shootout score

Lone Star Conference Playoffs
July 12, 2017
7:00 PM CDT
Semifinals

Houston Dutch Lions FC	1–3	Midland-Odessa FC
Armstrong 64'; Cortes (yellow card) 84'	Match Report	O'Grady 1', 3' (yellow card) 27'; Mellado 73' (yellow card) 84'; Ritchie (yellow card) 79'; Sanchez (yellow card) 87'; Penner (yellow card) 90'

Houston Dutch Lions FC Soccer Facility
Conroe, Texas
July 12, 2017
7:30 PM CDY
Semifinals

Fort Worth Vaqueros	2–3	Shreveport Rafters FC

Martin Field
Fort Worth, Texas
Attendance: 800

July 15, 2017
7:30 pm CDT
Final

Midland-Odessa FC	2–1 (a.e.t.)	Shreveport Rafters FC
Strambler 51'; Sanchez (pen.)		Wallace 78'

Grande Communications Stadium
Midland, Texas

=== Southeast Conference Playoffs ===
Quarterfinal; July 11
**E2**	**Atlanta Silverbacks**	**1**
E3	Asheville City SC	0
W2	Chattanooga FC	1
**W3**	**Inter Nashville FC**	**2**

Semifinal; July 14
**W1**	**New Orleans Jesters**	**1**
E2	Atlanta Silverbacks	0
E1	Knoxville Force	1
**W3**	**Inter Nashville FC**	**2**

Final; July 15
W1	New Orleans Jesters	0
**W3**	**Inter Nashville FC**	**3**

Bold = winner
* = after extra time, ( ) = penalty shootout score

Southeast Conference Playoffs
July 11, 2017
3:30 PM EDT
Quarterfinals

Atlanta Silverbacks	1–0	Asheville City SC
Johanning 68'	Report

Silverbacks Park
Atlanta, Georgia
July 11, 2017
7:30 PM EDT
Quarterfinals

Chattanooga FC	1–2	Inter Nashville FC
Smedt 45' (pen.); Lever (yellow card) 88'	Match Report	Coffman (yellow card) 45'; Gomez 77'; Aruh 77'; Warden (yellow card) 80'; Grant (yellow card) 88'

Finley Stadium
Chattanooga, Tennessee
Attendance: 4,189

July 14, 2017
3:00 PM CDT
Semifinals

Knoxville Force	1–2	Inter Nashville FC
Baker 42'; Taylor (yellow card) 52'; Pickering (yellow card) 80'	Match Report	Narke 39'; Aruh 70' (yellow card) 77'; Collins (yellow card) 88'

Pan American Stadium
New Orleans, Louisiana
July 14, 2017
7:00 PM CDT
Semifinals

New Orleans Jesters	1–0	Atlanta Silverbacks
Judice 35'; Rice (yellow card) 53'; Heath (yellow card) 78'; Wiseman (yellow card) 83'; Walsh (yellow card) 86'	Match Report	Brown (yellow card) 28'; Dampha (yellow card) 84'; Kamara (yellow card) 89'

Pan American Stadium
New Orleans, Louisiana
Attendance: 2,875

July 15, 2017
7:00 PM CDT
Final

New Orleans Jesters	0–3	Inter Nashville FC
Heath (yellow card) 26'; Olumuyiwa (red card) 44'; Evans (yellow card) 66'; Siscov (yellow card) 79'	Match Report	Warden (yellow card) 11'; Collins 45'; Gomez 65'; Foster 90'

Pan American Stadium
New Orleans, Louisiana

=== Atlantic Blue Conference Playoffs ===
Semifinal; July 12			Final; July 15
			**1**	**Elm City Express**	**2**
2	Brooklyn Italians	0	3	TSF FC	0
**3**	**TSF FC**	**1**

Bold = winner
* = after extra time, ( ) = penalty shootout score

Atlantic Blue Conference Playoffs
July 12, 2017
7:00 PM EDT
Semifinal

Brooklyn Italians	0–1	TSF FC
Falanaga (yellow card) 5'; Olafsen (yellow card) 19'; Hestnes (yellow card) 81'; Joachim (yellow card) 90'; Taieb (yellow card) 90'	Match Report	Terci (yellow card) 16'; Czyrnek (yellow card) 39'; Soto (yellow card) 47'; Pinho 77'; Carbajal (yellow card) 90'; Forson (yellow card) 90'

LIU Brooklyn Athletic Complex
Brooklyn, New York

July 15, 2017
7:00 PM EDT
Final

Elm City Express	2–0	TSF FC
Morgan 64'; Sousa 89' (pen.)	Match Report Report 2	Maldonado (yellow card) 81'

Reese Stadium
New Haven, Connecticut
Attendance: 1,000

=== Atlantic White Conference Playoffs ===
Semifinal; July 12			Final; July 15
			**1**	**Kingston Stockade FC**	**2***
2	Boston City FC	1	3	Hartford City FC	1
**3**	**Hartford City FC**	**2**

Bold = winner
* = after extra time, ( ) = penalty shootout score

Atlantic White Conference Playoffs
July 12, 2017
8:00 PM EDT
Semifinals

Boston City FC	1–2	Hartford City FC
Rincón 23'	Report	Junqueira 31'; Johnson 90'

Malden Catholic High School
Malden, Massachusetts

July 15, 2017
Final

Kingston Stockade FC	2–1 (a.e.t.)	Hartford City FC
Jeter 15'; Creswick 94'	Match Report	Stezewski 5'; Brooks (yellow card) 87'; Archambault (yellow card) 98'; Albertini (yellow card) 103'; Kara (yellow card) 109'; Lelis (red card) 120'

Dietz Stadium
Kingston, New York
Attendance: 1,393

=== Keystone Conference Playoffs ===
Semifinal; July 11-July 12
**1**	**New Jersey Copa FC**	**2**
4	Electric City Shock SC	1
**2**	**Clarkstown SC Eagles**	**1**
3	West Chester United SC	0

Final; July 15
1	New Jersey Copa FC	1
**2**	**Clarkstown SC Eagles**	**3**

Bold = winner
* = after extra time, ( ) = penalty shootout score

Keystone Conference Playoffs
July 11, 2017
7:00 PM EDT
Semifinals

New Jersey Copa FC	2–1	Electric City Shock SC
Araujo 30', 90' (yellow card) 90'	Match Report	Smalley 72'; Smalley (yellow card) 87'

St. John Vianney High School
Holmdel Township, New Jersey
Attendance: 600
July 12, 2017
8:00 PM EDT
Semifinals

Clarkstown SC Eagles	1–0	West Chester United SC
Kavanagh 56' (yellow card) 66'; Chronis (yellow card) 59'; Riordan (yellow card) 72'	Match Report	Wilson (yellow card) 61'

Fairleigh Dickinson University Soccer Stadium
Teaneck, New Jersey

July 15, 2017
7:00 PM EDT
Final

New Jersey Copa FC	1–3	Clarkstown SC Eagles
Araujo (yellow card) 15'; Vicente (yellow card) 18'; Sowe (yellow card) 52'; Campbell 90'	Match Report	Katona 19', 54'; Lawrence 53' (pen.)

St. John Vianney High School
Holmdel Township, New Jersey

=== Mid-Atlantic Conference Playoffs ===
Semifinal; July 12
1	Virginia Beach City FC	1
**4**	**Legacy 76**	**3**
**2**	**FC Frederick**	**2**
3	Fredericksburg FC	1

Final; July 15
**4**	**Legacy 76**	**3**
2	FC Frederick	1

Bold = winner
* = after extra time, ( ) = penalty shootout score

Mid-Atlantic Conference Playoffs
July 12, 2017
7:00 PM EDT
Semifinals

Virginia Beach City FC	1–3	Legacy 76
Thompson 15'	Match Report	Grace 8', 30', 88'; Young (yellow card) 90'

Virginia Beach Sportsplex
Virginia Beach, Virginia
July 12, 2017
7:30 PM EDT
Semifinals

FC Frederick	2–1	Fredericksburg FC
Gosselin 10'; Toure 29'	Report	Sakou 44'

Urbana High School
Ijamsville, Maryland

July 15, 2017
4:00 PM EDT
Final

FC Frederick	1–3 (a.e.t.)	Legacy 76
Demich 89'; Baker (yellow card) 94'	Match Report	Gunderson 7'; Gotay (yellow card) 68'; Trott (yellow card) 87'; Wolons (yellow card) 95'; Flesch 109'; Grace 120'

Thomas Athletic Field
Frederick, Maryland

=== Regional and National Playoffs ===
Regional First round July 14–22
**W1**	**FC Arizona**	**3**
W8	Albion SC Pros	1
**W4**	**Orange County FC**	**1**
W5	Riverside Coras	0
**W2**	**CD Aguiluchos USA**	**4**
W7	Sonoma County Sol	0
**W3**	**Kitsap SC**	**2**
W6	FC Mulhouse Portland	0
MW3	Erie Commodores FC	0
**MW6**	**Dayton Dynamo FC**	**1**
**MW4**	**Detroit City FC**	**5**
MW5	Dakota Fusion FC	1

Regional semifinal July 22–28
**NE1**	**Elm City Express**	**4**
NE4	Legacy 76	0
**NE2**	**Clarkstown SC Eagles**	**6**
NE3	Kingston Stockade FC	3
W1	FC Arizona	0
**W4**	**Orange County FC**	**2**
**W2**	**CD Aguiluchos USA**	**4**
W3	Kitsap SC	2
**MW1**	**AFC Ann Arbor**	**1**
MW6	Dayton Dynamo FC	0
MW2	Duluth FC	2
**MW4**	**Detroit City FC**	**5**
SS	Miami Fusion FC	0
**SE**	**Inter Nashville FC**	**1**
HL	FC Wichita	0
**LS**	**Midland-Odessa FC**	**1**

Regional Final; July 29
**NE1**	**Elm City Express**	**3**
NE2	Clarkstown SC Eagles	1
W4	Orange County FC	0
**W2**	**CD Aguiluchos USA**	**1**
MW1	AFC Ann Arbor	2
**MW4**	**Detroit City FC**	**3**
SE	Inter Nashville FC	0
**LS**	**Midland-Odessa FC**	**1**

National semifinal August 5
**1**	**Elm City Express**	**2**
4	CD Aguiluchos USA	0
2	Detroit City FC	0(2)
**3**	**Midland-Odessa FC**	**0(4)**

National Final; August 12
**1**	**Elm City Express**	**5**
3	Midland-Odessa FC	0

Bold = winner

^{A} The final four teams were reseeded based on points per game in the regular season.

* = after extra time, ( ) = penalty shootout score

=== Regional First Round ===
West Region First Round
July 14, 2017
8:00 PM MDT
Quarterfinals

FC Arizona	3–1	Albion SC Pros
Alton 4'; Salama 11'; Casillas 37' (red card) 78'; Bolanos (yellow card) 57' (yellow-red card) 77'; Lamarca (yellow card) 90'; Nieblas (yellow card) 90'	Match Report	Sanfilippo 20'; Antoine (red card) 78'; Oliveira (yellow card) 78'

John D Riggs Stadium
Mesa, Arizona
July 15, 2017
6:00 PM PDT
Quarterfinals

Orange County FC	1–0	Riverside Coras
Weber 40'	Match Report	Valencia (yellow card) 83'; Rojas (yellow card) 86'

Portola High School
Irvine, California
July 15, 2017
7:00 PM PDT
Quarterfinals

CD Aguiluchos USA	4–0	Sonoma County Sol
Rawnsley 12', 74', 76'; Hatifie (yellow card) 31'; Guerra 58'	Match Report	Vasquez (yellow card) 59'

Burrell Field
San Leandro, California
July 15, 2017
7:00 PM PDT
Quarterfinals

Kitsap SC	2–0	FC Mulhouse Portland
Lomeli 3'; Ruiz 55'; Guerin (yellow card) 71'	Match Report	Bagby (yellow card) 72'

Gordon Field
Bremerton, Washington

Midwest Region First Round
July 22, 2017
7:00 PM EDT
Quarterfinals

Erie Commodores FC	0–1	Dayton Dynamo
Solomon (yellow card) 88'	Match Report	Willi (yellow card) 32'; Kinkopf (yellow card) 45'; Mowery 90'

Gannon University Field
Erie, Pennsylvania
July 22, 2017
7:30 PM EDT
Quarterfinals

Detroit City FC	5–1	Dakota Fusion FC
Lawson 25', 76'; Harris 35' (pen.), 81'; Green 47'	Match Report	Abase 19'; Robbins (yellow card) 20'; Baclawski (yellow card) 40'; Beljulji (yellow card) 67'; Eastwell (red card) 79'; Mberwa (yellow card) 80'

Keyworth Stadium
Hamtramck, Michigan
Attendance: 6,672

=== Regional Semifinals ===
Northeast Region Semifinals
July 21, 2017
7:00 PM EDT
Semifinals

Elm City Express	4–0	Legacy 76
Saunchez 17'; Kanyo (yellow card) 42'; Brito 63'; Morgan 68', 73'; Carneiro (yellow card) 84'	Match Report	Flesch (yellow card) 86'; Speed (yellow card) 88'; Burrell (red card) 90'

Reese Stadium
New Haven, Connecticut
July 22, 2017
7:00 PM EDT
Semifinals

Clarkstown SC Eagles	6–3	Kingston Stockade FC
Machado (yellow card) 5'; Kelly (yellow card) 39'; 44' (o.g.); Katona 55'; Kavanagh 60'; Garcia 69', 79'; Berriel (yellow card) 85'; Valerio 90'	Match Report	Gatti (yellow card) 5'; Espondola 11', 40'; Creswick (yellow card) 65'; Kozioł (yellow card) 77'; LeClerc 90'

Ranger Stadium
Madison, New Jersey

South Region Semifinals
July 22, 2017
7:00 PM EDT
Semifinals

Miami Fusion FC	0–1	Inter Nashville FC
Pierre (yellow card) 34'; Schenfeld (yellow card) 43'; Suazo (yellow card) 52'; Alvarez (yellow card) 85'	Match Report	Sassano (yellow card) 8'; Warden 22'; Cordova (yellow card) 29'; Gomez (yellow card) 86'

Ives Estates Park
Ives Estates, Florida
July 22, 2017
8:00 PM CDT
Semifinals

FC Wichita	0–1	Midland-Odessa FC
	Match Report	Strambler (yellow card) 22'; Rubio (yellow card) 73'; Mendoza (yellow card) 81'; Penner 90'; VonHolle (yellow card) 90'

Stryker Soccer Complex
Wichita, Kansas

West Region Semifinals
July 22, 2017
7:30 PM PDT
Semifinals

FC Arizona	0–2	Orange County FC
Paul (yellow card) 56'; Papa (yellow card) 71'	Match Report	Bryant 52' (yellow card) 59'; Canale 70' (yellow card) 76'; Gomez (yellow card) 90'

John D Riggs Stadium
Mesa, Arizona
July 22, 2017
7:30 PM PDT
Semifinals

CD Aguiluchos USA	4–2	Kitsap SC
Rawnsley 2', 78' (pen.); Ruiz (yellow card) 45'; Martinez (yellow card) 59'; Maldonado (yellow card) 62'; Middlemiss 64'; Souza (red card) 67'; Amaya (red card) 71'; Valdez (yellow card) 71'; Hatifie (yellow card) 74'; Freire 90'	Match Report	Ruiz 68' (pen.); Lomeli (yellow card) 74' (yellow-red card) 75'; Hill (yellow card) 89'; Charles 90'

Burrell Field
San Leandro, California

Midwest Region Semifinals
July 28, 2017
5:15 PM EDT
Semifinals

AFC Ann Arbor	1–0	Dayton Dynamo
Lasinski (yellow card) 39'; Braem (yellow card) 65'; Vaughan 90'	Match Report	Hutton (yellow card) 31'; Dupont (yellow card) 39'; Mowery (yellow card) 41'

Keyworth Stadium
Hamtramck, Michigan
July 28, 2017
8:00 PM EDT
Semifinals

Duluth FC	2–5	Detroit City FC
Farrar 25'; Phillips 27'; Watt (yellow card) 45'; Ben-Tal (yellow card) 46'	Match Report	Mondi 18', 32', 45'; Edwardson 35'; Carroll (yellow card) 52'; Sinclair 69'

Keyworth Stadium
Hamtramck, Michigan
Attendance: 6,989

=== Regional Finals ===
Northeast Region Final
July 29, 2017
7:00 PM EDT
Final

Elm City Express	3–1	Clarkstown SC Eagles
Saunchez 19'; Hernandez 46'; Morgan 90' (yellow card) 90'	Match Report	Barrenechea (yellow card) 13'; Machado (yellow card) 59'; Lawrence 69'; Katona (yellow card) 90'; Garcia (red card) 90'

Reese Stadium
New Haven, Connecticut
Attendance: 1,500

Midwest Region Final
July 29, 2017
7:30 PM EDT
Final

AFC Ann Arbor	2–3	Detroit City FC
Braem (yellow card) 30'; Zisette (yellow card) 45'; Rufe (yellow card) 55' (yellow-red card) 90'; Allen (red card) 66'; Jirira 75'; Lasinski 81'; Vaughan (yellow card) 83'	Match Report	Tyler 35'; Watson (yellow card) 43'; Edwardson 45'; Mondi 90'; Moorman (yellow card) 90'

Keyworth Stadium
Hamtramck, Michigan
Attendance: 6,409

South Region Final
July 29, 2017
7:30 PM CDT
Final

Midland-Odessa FC	1–0	Inter Nashville FC
Penner 72' (yellow card) 89'; Palomino (yellow card) 82'; Jarvis (yellow card) 90'	Match Report	Reichenberger (yellow card) 89'; Collins (yellow card) 90'

Grande Communications Stadium
Midland, Texas
Attendance: 1,018

West Region Final
July 29, 2017
7:00 PM PDT
Final

CD Aguiluchos USA	1–0	Orange County FC
Santiago (yellow card) 47'; Hatifie (yellow card) 66'; Middlemiss 68'; Gonzalez (yellow card) 83'	Match Report	Canale (yellow card) 50'; Ianni (yellow card) 86'; Bryant (yellow card) 89'

Burrell Field
San Leandro, California

=== National Semifinals ===
August 5, 2017
7:00 PM EDT
National Semifinal

Elm City Express	2–0	CD Aguiluchos USA
Brito 9'; Oliveira (yellow card) 36'; Saunchez 45'	Match Report	Hatifie (yellow card) 13'; Hatifie (yellow card) 20'; Ruiz (yellow card) 29'; Valdez (yellow card) 50'; Martinez (yellow card) 86'

Reese Stadium
New Haven, Connecticut
Attendance: 2,261
August 5, 2017
7:00 PM EDT
National Semifinal

Detroit City FC	0–0	Midland-Odessa FC
Watson (yellow card) 26'; Edwardson (yellow card) 36'; Sinclair (yellow card) 64'; Lawson (yellow card) 90'; Mollon (red card) 91'	Match Report	VonHolle (yellow card) 17'; Jarvis (yellow card) 82'; Diaz (yellow card) 94'
Penalties
Green (penalty missed); Lawson (penalty scored); Castorino (penalty missed); Carroll (penalty scored)	2–4	(penalty scored) Rubio; (penalty scored) Moulin; (penalty scored) Sanchez; (penalty missed) O'Grady; (penalty scored) Bentley

Keyworth Stadium
Hamtramck, Michigan
Attendance: 7,533

=== NPSL Championship Game ===
August 12, 2017
7:00 PM EDT

Elm City Express	5–0	Midland-Odessa FC
Morgan 26', 44'; Swift 75', 90'; Oliveira 80'	Match Report	Palomino (yellow card) 85'

Reese Stadium
New Haven, Connecticut
Attendance: 3,112
