= 2016 NPSL season =

National Premier Soccer League
- Season: 2016
- Champions: AFC Cleveland (1st Title)
- Regular Season Champions: Chattanooga FC (1st Title)
- Matches: 513
- Goals: 1,799 (3.51 per match)
- Best Player: (Liberia) Nana Addai (Rhode Island Reds)
- Top goalscorer: (Liberia) Nana Addai (Rhode Island Reds) (England) Simon Rawnsley (Aguiluchos USA) (18 Goals Each)
- Best goalkeeper: (England) Gregory Hartley (Chattanooga FC)

The 2016 NPSL season was the 104th season of FIFA-sanctioned soccer in the United States, and the 14th season of the National Premier Soccer League.

== Regions and Conferences ==
Locations of NPSL clubs for 2016. Blue = Northeast Region clubs, Yellow = South Region clubs, Green = Midwest Region clubs, Red = West Region clubs

== Changes from 2015 ==
=== Incoming teams ===
Team	Location	Region/Conference	Notes
Albion SC Pros	San Diego, California	West - Southwest	Expansion
North County Battalion	San Diego, California	West - Southwest	Expansion
Southern California Sports Club	San Bernardino, California	West - Southwest	Expansion
Corinthians USA	Fontana, California	West - Southwest	Expansion
AFC Ann Arbor	Ann Arbor, Michigan	Midwest - Great Lakes West	From Great Lakes Premier League
Grand Rapids FC	Grand Rapids, Michigan	Midwest - Great Lakes West	From Great Lakes Premier League
Kalamazoo FC	Kalamazoo, Michigan	Midwest - Great Lakes West	Expansion
Rochester River DogZ FC	Rochester, New York	Midwest - Great Lakes East	Expansion
Chicago Mustangs	Chicago, Illinois	Midwest - Central	From MASL
LC Aris FC	La Crosse, Wisconsin	Midwest - Central	Returning from Hiatus
Milwaukee Torrent	Milwaukee, Wisconsin	Midwest - Central	Expansion
Fort Lauderdale Strikers U-23	Fort Lauderdale, Florida	Sunshine - South	Expansion
Tampa Bay Rowdies 2	Tampa, Florida	Sunshine - South	Expansion
Birmingham Hammers	Birmingham, Alabama	Southeast - South	Expansion
Memphis City FC	Memphis, Tennessee	Southeast - South	Expansion
Tobacco Road FC	Durham, North Carolina	South Atlantic - South	Expansion
Houston Dutch Lions FC	Houston, Texas	South Central - South	From PDL
Little Rock Rangers	Little Rock, Arkansas	South Central - South	Expansion
Shreveport Rafters FC	Shreveport, Louisiana	South Central - South	Expansion
Junior Lone Star FC	Philadelphia, Pennsylvania	Keystone - Northeast	Returning from Hiatus
New Jersey Copa FC	Metuchen, New Jersey	Keystone - Northeast	Expansion
Boston City FC	Boston, Massachusetts	Atlantic - Northeast	Expansion
Kingston Stockade FC	Kingston, New York	Atlantic - Northeast	Expansion

=== Moved and/or Rebranded teams ===
Team	Prev Name	Location	Prev Location	Notes
East Bay FC Stompers	San Francisco Stompers	Hayward, California	San Francisco, California	Relocated
OSA FC	FC Tacoma 253	Seattle, Washington	Tacoma, Washington	Rebrand and Move
Dayton Dynamo	Cincinnati Saints	Dayton, Ohio	Cincinnati, Ohio	Rebrand and Move
Indy Eleven NPSL	Indiana Fire NPSL	Indianapolis, Indiana		Acquired by Indy Eleven
Jacksonville Armada U-23	Jacksonville United	Jacksonville, Florida		Acquired by Jacksonville Armada FC
Atlanta Silverbacks	Atlanta Silverbacks Reserves	Atlanta, Georgia		After NASL team folded, Reserves took over brand
Richmond Strikers	Chesterfield United FC	Richmond, Virginia		Richmond and Chesterfield clubs merged

=== Outgoing teams ===
Team	Location	Notes
FC Force	San Diego, California	Inactive
Fort Pitt FC Regiment	Pittsburgh, Pennsylvania	Inactive
Jersey Blues FC	Morristown, New Jersey	Have not played any games in 2016 and look to be inactive.
Madison 56ers	Madison, Wisconsin	Moved to PLA
Minnesota United FC Reserves	Minneapolis, Minnesota	Moved to PLA
San Diego Flash	San Diego, California	Hiatus
Upward Stars	Spartanburg, South Carolina	Folded

== Standings ==
=== Northeast Region ===
==== Atlantic Conference ====
Pos	Team	Pld	W	L	T	GF	GA	GD	Pts	Qualification
1	New York Cosmos B (C, Q)	16	12	2	2	49	19	+30	38	2016 NPSL Northeast Region playoffs
2	Boston City FC (Q)	16	10	4	2	25	22	+3	32	2016 NPSL Northeast Region playoffs
3	Rhode Island Reds	16	8	7	1	36	37	−1	25	
4	Greater Lowell United FC	16	6	5	5	27	24	+3	23	
5	Seacoast United Phantoms	16	6	6	4	27	33	−6	22	
6	Brooklyn Italians	16	5	6	5	31	24	+7	20	
7	Kingston Stockade FC	16	5	8	3	28	29	−1	18	
8	New York Athletic Club	16	3	8	5	17	28	−11	14	
9	Seacoast United Mariners	16	2	11	3	14	38	−24	9	

Updated to match(es) played on July 10, 2016. Source: NPSL standings
Rules for classification: 1) points; 2) head-to-head; 3) goal differential in head-to-head results; 4) wins; 5) total goal differential; 6) fewest losses; 7) coin toss
(C) Champions; (Q) Qualified for the phase indicated

===== Top scorers =====
Rank	Player	Team	Goals
1	Isaac Nana Addai	Rhode Island Reds	18
2	Michael Creswick	Kingston Stockade FC	9
3	Rasmus Hansen	Brooklyn Italians	8
4	Ivan Bertarame	New York Cosmos B	7
5	Michael Bustamante	Boston City FC	6
5	Homero Morais	Boston City FC	6
7	Quincy Appah	Greater Lowell United FC	5
7	Franklin Castellanos	New York Cosmos B	5
7	Trey Williams	New York Cosmos B	5
10	Daniel Bedoya	New York Cosmos B	4
10	Joao Cardosa	Rhode Island Reds	4
10	Kareem Joachim	Brooklyn Italians	4
10	Tanor Jobe	Rhode Island Reds	4
10	Franklin Pena	Greater Lowell United FC	4
10	Corey Phillips	Kingston Stockade FC	4
10	Matias Ruiz	New York Cosmos B	4
10	Augusto Silva	Greater Lowell United FC	4

As of July 11, 2016

==== Keystone Conference ====
Pos	Team	Pld	W	L	T	GF	GA	GD	Pts	Qualification
1	Clarkstown SC Eagles (C, Q)	12	10	1	1	31	12	+19	31	2016 NPSL Northeast Region playoffs
2	New Jersey Copa FC (Q)	12	6	1	5	22	10	+12	23	2016 NPSL Northeast Region playoffs
3	Junior Lone Star FC	12	6	3	3	27	19	+8	21	
4	GBFC Thunder	12	4	6	2	21	28	−7	14	
5	Hershey FC	12	2	5	5	19	27	−8	11	
6	Electric City Shock SC	12	3	7	2	20	29	−9	11	
7	Buxmont Torch FC	12	1	9	2	16	31	−15	5	

Updated to match(es) played on July 10, 2016. Source: NPSL standings
Rules for classification: 1) points; 2) head-to-head; 3) goal differential in head-to-head results; 4) wins; 5) total goal differential; 6) fewest losses; 7) coin toss
(C) Champions; (Q) Qualified for the phase indicated

==== Mid-Atlantic Conference ====
Pos	Team	Pld	W	L	T	GF	GA	GD	Pts	Qualification
1	Fredericksburg FC (C, Q)	10	6	2	2	17	8	+9	20	2016 NPSL Northeast Region playoffs
2	Legacy 76 (Q)	10	6	2	2	18	11	+7	20	2016 NPSL Northeast Region playoffs
3	Virginia Beach City FC	10	5	2	3	20	12	+8	18	
4	Richmond Strikers	10	4	5	1	14	20	−6	13	
5	FC Frederick	10	2	6	2	10	16	−6	8	
6	ASA Charge	10	1	7	2	11	23	−12	5	

Updated to match(es) played on July 9, 2016. Source: NPSL standings
Rules for classification: 1) points; 2) head-to-head; 3) goal differential in head-to-head results; 4) wins; 5) total goal differential; 6) fewest losses; 7) coin toss
(C) Champions; (Q) Qualified for the phase indicated

=== South Region ===
==== South Atlantic Conference ====
Pos	Team	Pld	W	L	T	GF	GA	GD	Pts	Qualification
1	Myrtle Beach Mutiny (Q)	10	6	1	3	23	10	+13	21	2016 NPSL South Atlantic Conference playoffs
2	Atlanta Silverbacks (Q)	10	5	1	4	17	10	+7	19	2016 NPSL South Atlantic Conference playoffs
3	Carolina RailHawks NPSL (Q)	10	4	4	2	24	14	+10	14	2016 NPSL South Atlantic Conference playoffs
4	Tobacco Road FC (Q)	10	3	4	3	16	22	−6	12	2016 NPSL South Atlantic Conference playoffs
5	FC Carolina Discoveries	10	2	4	4	20	23	−3	10	
6	Georgia Revolution	10	1	7	2	10	31	−21	5	

Updated to match(es) played on July 3, 2016. Source: NPSL standings
Rules for classification: 1) points; 2) head-to-head; 3) goal differential in head-to-head results; 4) wins; 5) total goal differential; 6) fewest losses; 7) coin toss
(Q) Qualified for the phase indicated

==== South Central Conference ====
Pos	Team	Pld	W	L	T	GF	GA	GD	Pts	Qualification
1	Tulsa Athletics (Q)	12	11	1	0	38	9	+29	33	2016 NPSL South Central Conference playoffs
2	Houston Dutch Lions FC (Q)	12	9	1	2	34	13	+21	29	2016 NPSL South Central Conference playoffs
3	FC Wichita (Q)	12	9	2	1	31	11	+20	28	2016 NPSL South Central Conference playoffs
4	Dallas City FC (Q)	12	6	5	1	23	17	+6	19	2016 NPSL South Central Conference playoffs
5	Liverpool Warriors (Q)	12	6	5	1	26	17	+9	19	2016 NPSL South Central Conference playoffs
6	Shreveport Rafters FC (Q)	12	5	5	2	18	20	−2	17	2016 NPSL South Central Conference playoffs
7	Little Rock Rangers	12	5	6	1	16	18	−2	16	
8	Corinthians FC of San Antonio	12	4	6	2	27	30	−3	14	
9	Houston Regals	12	2	9	1	10	35	−25	7	
10	Joplin Demize	12	2	10	0	11	40	−29	6	
11	Fort Worth Vaqueros FC	12	1	10	1	11	38	−27	4	

Updated to match(es) played on July 3, 2016. Source: NPSL standings
Rules for classification: 1) points; 2) head-to-head; 3) goal differential in head-to-head results; 4) wins; 5) total goal differential; 6) fewest losses; 7) coin toss
(Q) Qualified for the phase indicated

==== Southeast Conference ====
Pos	Team	Pld	W	L	T	GF	GA	GD	Pts	Qualification
1	Chattanooga FC (Q, C)	10	9	0	1	21	3	+18	28	2016 NPSL Southeast Conference playoffs
2	Memphis City FC (Q)	10	5	3	2	17	12	+5	17	2016 NPSL Southeast Conference playoffs
3	New Orleans Jesters (Q)	10	4	4	2	16	15	+1	14	2016 NPSL Southeast Conference playoffs
4	Knoxville Force (Q)	10	4	6	0	13	24	−11	12	2016 NPSL Southeast Conference playoffs
5	Nashville FC	10	3	7	0	12	16	−4	9	
6	Birmingham Hammers	10	2	7	1	10	19	−9	7	

Updated to match(es) played on July 3, 2016. Source: NPSL standings
Rules for classification: 1) points; 2) head-to-head; 3) goal differential in head-to-head results; 4) wins; 5) total goal differential; 6) fewest losses; 7) coin toss
(C) Champions; (Q) Qualified for the phase indicated

==== Sunshine Conference ====
Pos	Team	Pld	W	L	T	GF	GA	GD	Pts	Qualification
1	Miami United FC (C)	10	9	1	0	28	13	+15	27	2016 NPSL South Region playoffs
2	Jacksonville Armada U-23	10	5	2	3	26	13	+13	18	
3	Miami Fusion FC	10	5	2	3	21	9	+12	18	
4	Tampa Bay Rowdies 2	10	4	4	2	17	12	+5	14	
5	Storm FC	10	3	4	3	19	14	+5	12	
6	Kraze United	10	3	4	3	21	24	−3	12	
7	Fort Lauderdale Strikers U-23	10	4	6	0	12	24	−12	12	
8	Weston FC	10	0	10	0	8	43	−35	0	

Updated to match(es) played on July 10, 2016. Source: NPSL standings
Rules for classification: 1) points; 2) head-to-head; 3) goal differential in head-to-head results; 4) wins; 5) total goal differential; 6) fewest losses; 7) coin toss
(C) Champions

=== Midwest Region ===
==== Central Conference ====
Pos	Team	Pld	W	L	T	GF	GA	GD	Pts
1	Milwaukee Torrent (C)	6	6	0	0	27	2	+25	18
2	Chicago Mustangs	6	3	3	0	13	9	+4	9
3	Minnesota TwinStars	6	3	3	0	11	17	−6	9
4	LC Aris FC	6	0	6	0	8	31	−23	0

Updated to match(es) played on July 23, 2016. Source: NPSL standings
Rules for classification: 1) points; 2) head-to-head; 3) goal differential in head-to-head results; 4) wins; 5) total goal differential; 6) fewest losses; 7) coin toss
(C) Champions

==== Great Lakes East Conference ====
Pos	Team	Pld	W	L	T	GF	GA	GD	Pts	Qualification
1	AFC Cleveland (C, Q)	10	8	2	0	25	9	+16	24	2016 NPSL Midwest Region playoffs
2	Indy Eleven NPSL (Q)	10	6	3	1	18	15	+3	19	2016 NPSL Midwest Region playoffs
3	FC Buffalo	10	5	3	2	16	12	+4	17	
4	Rochester River DogZ FC	10	3	4	3	12	14	−2	12	
5	Erie Commodores FC	10	2	4	4	18	16	+2	10	
6	FC Indiana Lions	10	0	8	2	5	28	−23	2	

Updated to match(es) played on July 10, 2016. Source: NPSL standings
Rules for classification: 1) points; 2) head-to-head; 3) goal differential in head-to-head results; 4) wins; 5) total goal differential; 6) fewest losses; 7) coin toss
(C) Champions; (Q) Qualified for the phase indicated

==== Great Lakes West Conference ====
Pos	Team	Pld	W	L	T	GF	GA	GD	Pts	Qualification
1	Grand Rapids FC (C, Q)	12	7	1	4	21	11	+10	25	2016 NPSL Midwest Region playoffs
2	AFC Ann Arbor (Q)	12	6	3	3	19	16	+3	21	2016 NPSL Midwest Region playoffs
3	Michigan Stars FC	12	5	3	4	17	13	+4	19	
4	Lansing United	12	4	4	4	16	14	+2	16	
5	Detroit City FC	12	4	4	4	24	21	+3	16	
6	Kalamazoo FC	12	4	6	2	12	15	−3	14	
7	Dayton Dynamo	12	1	10	1	8	27	−19	4	

Updated to match(es) played on July 15, 2016. Source: NPSL standings
Rules for classification: 1) points; 2) head-to-head; 3) goal differential in head-to-head results; 4) wins; 5) total goal differential; 6) fewest losses; 7) coin toss
(C) Champions; (Q) Qualified for the phase indicated

=== West Region ===
==== Golden Gate Conference ====
Pos	Team	Pld	W	L	T	GF	GA	GD	Pts	Qualification
1	Sonoma County Sol (Q)	14	8	4	2	40	25	+15	26	2016 NPSL West Region playoffs
2	CD Aguiluchos USA (Q)	14	7	4	3	36	20	+16	24	2016 NPSL West Region playoffs
3	East Bay FC Stompers (Q)	14	6	4	4	28	23	+5	22	2016 NPSL West Region playoffs
4	Sacramento Gold	14	7	7	0	29	29	0	21	
5	Real San Jose	14	1	11	2	8	48	−40	5	

Updated to match(es) played on July 4, 2016. Source: NPSL standings
Rules for classification: 1) points; 2) head-to-head; 3) goal differential in head-to-head results; 4) wins; 5) total goal differential; 6) fewest losses; 7) coin toss
(Q) Qualified for the phase indicated

==== Northwest Conference ====
Pos	Team	Pld	W	L	T	GF	GA	GD	Pts	Qualification
1	OSA FC (Q)	10	5	3	2	17	12	+5	17	2016 NPSL West Region playoffs
2	Portland Spartans FC	10	4	5	1	12	13	−1	13	

Updated to match(es) played on July 4, 2016. Source: NPSL standings
Rules for classification: 1) points; 2) head-to-head; 3) goal differential in head-to-head results; 4) wins; 5) total goal differential; 6) fewest losses; 7) coin toss
(Q) Qualified for the phase indicated

==== Southwest Conference ====
Pos	Team	Pld	W	L	T	GF	GA	GD	Pts	Qualification
1	Albion SC Pros (Q)	12	8	0	4	30	8	+22	28	2016 NPSL West Region playoffs
2	North County Battalion (Q)	12	7	2	3	36	19	+17	24	2016 NPSL West Region playoffs
3	Deportivo Coras USA (Q)	12	7	3	2	34	17	+17	23	2016 NPSL West Region playoffs
4	SoCal SC (Q)	12	5	5	2	23	20	+3	17	2016 NPSL West Region playoffs
5	FC Hasental	12	3	7	2	21	32	−11	11	
6	Temecula FC	12	3	7	2	18	32	−14	11	
7	Sports Club Corinthians USA	12	0	9	3	9	43	−34	3	

Updated to match(es) played on July 4, 2016. Source: NPSL standings
Rules for classification: 1) points; 2) head-to-head; 3) goal differential in head-to-head results; 4) wins; 5) total goal differential; 6) fewest losses; 7) coin toss
(Q) Qualified for the phase indicated

== Playoffs ==
=== South Atlantic Conference Playoffs ===
Semifinal; July 7
1	Myrtle Beach Mutiny	0
**4**	**Tobacco Road FC**	**1**
**2**	**Atlanta Silverbacks**	**4**
3	Carolina RailHawks NPSL	0

Final; July 9
4	Tobacco Road FC	1
**2**	**Atlanta Silverbacks**	**2***

Bold = winner
* = after extra time, ( ) = penalty shootout score

South Atlantic Conference Playoffs
July 7, 2016
7:30 PM EDT
Semifinals

Atlanta Silverbacks	4–0	Carolina RailHawks NPSL
Obatola 31'; Polaz 54', 84'; Johanning 77'	Report

Georgia Gwinnett College
Lawrenceville, Georgia
July 7, 2016
7:00 PM EDT
Semifinals

Myrtle Beach Mutiny	0–1	Tobacco Road FC
Arambula (yellow card) 72'	Report	Mukungu (yellow card) 58'; Diouf 90' (pen.)

Ashley Booth Stadium
North Myrtle Beach, South Carolina

July 9, 2016
8:00 PM EDT
Final

Atlanta Silverbacks	2–1 (a.e.t.)	Tobacco Road FC
Garcia 90+1'; Tommy (red card); Shepard	Report	McCartney 72' (pen.)

Silverbacks Park
Atlanta, Georgia

=== South Central Conference Playoffs ===
Wild Card; July 6
4	Dallas City FC	0
**5**	**Liverpool Warriors**	**2**
**3**	**FC Wichita**	**3**
6	Shreveport Rafters FC	0

Semifinal; July 9
**1**	**Tulsa Athletics**	**4**
5	Liverpool Warriors	1
**2**	**Houston Dutch Lions FC**	**5**
3	FC Wichita	0

Final; July 10
1	Tulsa Athletics	1
**2**	**Houston Dutch Lions FC**	**2**

Bold = winner
* = after extra time, ( ) = penalty shootout score

South Central Conference Playoffs
July 6, 2016
7:00 PM CDT
Wildcard 1

FC Wichita	3–0	Shreveport Rafters FC
Ten Eyck 52' (pen.); Touloute; Weir 90'	Match Report	Deblaere (yellow card) 32'; Hammond (red card) 46'

Stryker Soccer Complex
Wichita, Kansas
July 6, 2016
7:30 PM CDT
Wildcard 2

Dallas City FC	0–2	Liverpool Warriors

Roffino Stadium
Dallas, Texas

July 9, 2016
3:30 PM CDT
Semifinals

Houston Dutch Lions FC	5–0	FC Wichita
Tucker 10'; Acevedo 19', 26' (yellow card) 45'; Covarrubias 37'; Dos Santos (yellow card) 64'; Pires 69'	Match Report	Lemons (yellow card) 19'; Ochoa (red card) 36'

Drillers Stadium
Tulsa, Oklahoma
July 9, 2016
7:30 PM CDT
Semifinals

Tulsa Athletic	4–1	Liverpool Warriors
Lueng 4', 21' (yellow card) 53'; Mitrik (yellow card) 48'; Shannon 61'; Coleman 84'	Match Report	Kamali (yellow card) 8'; Camara 15' (yellow card) 82'; Jones (yellow card) 64'; Ritter (yellow card) 89'

Drillers Stadium
Tulsa, Oklahoma

July 10, 2016
7:30 PM CDT
Final

Tulsa Athletic	1–2	Houston Dutch Lions FC
Smith (yellow card) 2' (goal) 75'; Morris (yellow card) 34'; Chavez (yellow card) 84'; Gibson (yellow card) 90'	Match Report	de Heredia 50'; Boegemann (yellow card) 67'; Acevedo (yellow card) 72' (goal) 86'; Kanan (yellow card) 82'

Drillers Stadium
Tulsa, Oklahoma

=== Southeast Conference Playoffs ===
Semifinal; July 8
**1**	**Chattanooga FC**	**5**
4	Knoxville Force	0
**2**	**Memphis City FC**	**3**
3	New Orleans Jesters	0

Final; July 9
**1**	**Chattanooga FC**	**2**
2	Memphis City FC	1

Bold = winner
* = after extra time, ( ) = penalty shootout score

Southeast Conference Playoffs
July 8, 2016
5:00 PM EDT
Semifinals

Memphis City FC	3–0	New Orleans Jesters
Steele 45'	Report

Finley Stadium
Chattanooga, Tennessee
July 8, 2016
7:30 PM EDT
Semifinals

Chattanooga FC	5–0	Knoxville Force
Winter 31'; Roberts 42', 53'; Goñi 67'; Aldred 74'	Match Report Report 2

Finley Stadium
Chattanooga, Tennessee
Attendance: 4,214

July 9, 2016
7:30 PM EDT
Final

Chattanooga FC	2–1	Memphis City FC
Winter 23'; Goñi 88'	Match Report	Steele (yellow card) 51'; Parker 70'; Acimovic (yellow card) 74'

Finley Stadium
Chattanooga, Tennessee
Attendance: 4,565

=== Regional and National Playoffs ===
Regional First round July 9–16
**1SW**	**Albion SC Pros**	**1(3)**
4SW	SoCal SC	1(1)
2GG	CD Aguiluchos USA	2
**3GG**	**OSA FC**	**3**
**2SW**	**North County Battalion**	**5**
3SW	Deportivo Coras USA	3
**1GG**	**Sonoma County Sol**	**3**
4GG	East Bay FC Stompers	1
**4**	**Legacy 76**	**0(5)**
5	Boston City FC	0(4)
3	Fredericksburg FC	2(8)
**6**	**New Jersey Copa FC**	**2(9)**

Regional semifinal July 16–22
**SE**	**Chattanooga FC**	**4**
SC	Houston Dutch Lions FC	0
**SS**	**Miami United FC**	**2**
SA	Atlanta Silverbacks	0
**1**	**Albion SC Pros**	**2**
4	OSA FC	1
2	North County Battalion	0
**3**	**Sonoma County Sol**	**3**
**1**	**Clarkstown SC Eagles**	**1**
4	Legacy 76	0
2	New York Cosmos B	0
**6**	**New Jersey Copa FC**	**1**
**1W**	**Grand Rapids FC**	**1**
2E	Indy Eleven NPSL	0
**1E**	**AFC Cleveland**	**0(4)**
2W	AFC Ann Arbor	0(2)

Regional Final; July 23
**SE**	**Chattanooga FC**	**0(5)**
SS	Miami United FC	0(3)
1	Albion SC Pros	0
**3**	**Sonoma County Sol**	**1**
**1**	**Clarkstown SC Eagles**	**2**
6	New Jersey Copa FC	0
1W	Grand Rapids FC	0(1)
**1E**	**AFC Cleveland**	**0(3)**

National semifinal July 30
1	Chattanooga FC	1
**4**	**Sonoma County Sol**	**2**
2	Clarkstown SC Eagles	2
**3**	**AFC Cleveland**	**3**

National Final; August 6
4	Sonoma County Sol	2
**3**	**AFC Cleveland**	**4**

^{A} Note: The national semifinal teams were reseeded and matched-up based on regular season points per game average

Bold = winner
* = after extra time, ( ) = penalty shootout score

=== Regional First Round ===
Southwest Conference
July 9, 2016
7:00 PM PDT
Quarterfinals

North County Battalion	5–3	Deportivo Coras USA
Pizarro 45', 89'; Roty 61'; Reyes 74'; Galbraith-Knapp (yellow card) 81'; Picou 88' (yellow card) 89'	Match Report	Shelton 7' (yellow card) 90'; Urbar 32'; Ayala (yellow card) 49'; Simoes (red card) 53'; Nunez 80'; Cabello (yellow card) 85' (yellow-red card) 86'; Shelton (yellow card) 90'

Del Norte High School
San Diego, California
July 9, 2016
7:00 PM PDT
Quarterfinals

Albion SC Pros	1–1 (a.e.t.)	SoCal SC
Liborio (yellow card) 34'; Cardona (yellow card) 44' (yellow-red card) 105'; Clare 82'; Ortega (yellow card) 114'	Report	Contreras (yellow card) 40'; Rico 62'; Hernandez (yellow card) 84'
Penalties
	3–1

Mission Bay High School
San Diego, California

Golden Gate Conference
July 9, 2016
7:00 PM PDT
Quarterfinals

Sonoma County Sol	3–1	East Bay FC Stompers
Varnadore 75', 77'; Spann 89'	Report	Gomez 45'

Santa Rosa High School
Santa Rosa, California
July 9, 2016
8:00 PM PDT
Quarterfinals

CD Aguiluchos USA	2–3	OSA FC
	Report

Raimondi Park
Oakland California

Northeast Region
July 16, 2016
5:00 PM EDT
Quarterfinals

Fredericksburg FC	2–2	New Jersey Copa FC
	Match Report
Penalties
	8–9

Battleground Athltetic Complex
Fredericksburg, Virginia
July 16, 2016
7:00 PM EDT
Quarterfinals

Legacy 76	0–0	Boston City FC
	Match Report	Rocha (yellow card) 116'; Vierira (yellow card) 118'
Penalties
Ghitis (penalty scored); Gotay (penalty scored); Lytton (penalty scored); Reid (penalty scored); Weiler (penalty scored)	5–4	(penalty scored) Cunha; (penalty scored) Morais; (penalty scored) Rocha

James City County Stadium-Wanner Stadium
Williamsburg, Virginia

=== Regional Semifinals ===
South Region
July 16, 2016
7:00 PM EDT
Semifinals

Miami United FC	2–0	Atlanta Silverbacks

Milander Park
Hialeah, Florida
July 16, 2016
7:30 PM EDT
Semifinals

Chattanooga FC	4–0	Houston Dutch Lions FC
Winter 23', 72'; Finlay 60'; Davidson 84'	Report

Finley Stadium
Chattanooga, Tennessee
Attendance: 6,480

West Region
July 16, 2016
7:00 PM PDT
Semifinals

Albion SC Pros	2–1	OSA FC
Clare 5'; Owens (yellow card) 31'; Marly (yellow card) 44'; Reza (yellow card) 52' (goal) 86'	Match Report	Coly 54'; Dugo (yellow card) 90'

Mission Bay High School
San Diego, California
July 16, 2016
7:30 PM PDT
Semifinals

Sonoma County Sol	3–0	North County Battalion
Varnadore 9'; Lopez 51', 72'	Match Report

Santa Rosa High School
Santa Rosa, California

Northeast Region
July 20, 2016
4:00 PM EDT
Semifinals

Clarkstown SC Eagles	1–0	Legacy 76
Nittoli 11'; Agboola (yellow card) 63'	Match Report	Gotay (yellow card) 41'; Faulkner (yellow card) 90'

Ramapo College
Mahwah, New Jersey
July 20, 2016
7:30 PM EDT
Semifinals

New York Cosmos B	0–1	New Jersey Copa FC
Bedoya (yellow card) 69'	Match Report	Santos (yellow card) 39'; Bellido (yellow card) 58'; Correia 65' (yellow card) 73'

Hofstra Soccer Stadium
Hempstead, New York

Midwest Region
July 22, 2016
4:30 PM EDT
Semifinals

AFC Cleveland	0–0	AFC Ann Arbor
Penalties
	4–2

Houseman Field
Grand Rapids, Michigan
Attendance: 6,912
July 22, 2016
7:30 PM EDT
Semifinals

Grand Rapids FC	1–0	Indy Eleven NPSL
Timmer (yellow card) 51'; Sullivan 70'; Abdoo (yellow card) 90'	Match Report	Soto-Jaquez (yellow card) 75'; Schmitt (yellow card) 89'

Houseman Field
Grand Rapids, Michigan
Attendance: 6,912

=== Regional Finals ===
Northeast Region Final
July 23, 2016
4:30 PM EDT

Clarkstown SC Eagles	2–0	New Jersey Copa FC
Nittoli 17'; Bannister 34'	Match Report	Preciado (yellow card) 39'; Santiago (yellow card) 54'; Santos (yellow card) 69'

Ramapo College
Mahwah, New Jersey

Midwest Region Final
July 23, 2016
7:30 PM EDT

Grand Rapids FC	0–0	AFC Cleveland
	Match Report Report 2
Penalties
Esquivel (penalty missed); Fischer (penalty missed); Vanderlaan (penalty scored); Timmer (penalty missed)	1–3	(penalty scored) Suljevic; (penalty scored) Derezic; (penalty scored) Jordan

Houseman Field
Grand Rapids, Michigan
Attendance: 3,451

South Region Final
July 23, 2016
7:30 PM EDT

Chattanooga FC	0–0	Miami United FC
Trude (yellow card) 116' (yellow-red card)	Report	Godoy (yellow card) 69' (yellow-red card)
Penalties
Ferraz (penalty scored); Welo (penalty scored); Roberts (penalty scored); Finlay (penalty scored); Hartley (penalty scored)	5–3	(penalty scored) León; (penalty missed) Sadaoui; (penalty scored) Dominguez

Finley Stadium
Chattanooga, Tennessee
Attendance: 10,104

West Region Final
July 23, 2016
7:00 PM PDT

Albion SC Pros	0–1	Sonoma County Sol
Reza (yellow card) 29'; Waligorski (yellow card) 72'; Cardona (yellow card) 76'	Match Report	Lombardi (yellow card) 22'; Frame (yellow card) 45'; Lopez 56'; Spann (yellow card) 82'

Mission Bay High School
San Diego, California

=== National Semifinals ===
July 30, 2016
4:00 PM EDT
Semifinal 1

Clarkstown SC Eagles	2–3	AFC Cleveland
Nikocevic 17'; Morris 70'	Report	Bell 18'; Beck 21'; Potocnik 53'

Ramapo College
Mahwah, New Jersey
July 30, 2016
7:30 PM EDT
Semifinal 2

Chattanooga FC	1–2	Sonoma County Sol
Roberts 5'	Report	Paravicini 80'; Whittaker 90+1'

Finley Stadium
Chattanooga, Tennessee
Attendance: 12,251

=== NPSL Championship Game ===
August 6, 2016
7:00 PM EDT

AFC Cleveland	4–2	Sonoma County Sol
Bell 32', 63'; Manfut 87'; Bell 90+2'	Report	Varnadore 15', 59'

Stan Skoczen Stadium
Independence, Ohio
Attendance: 2,205

== NPSL League Awards ==
Week	NPSL Player of the Week			
Week	Player	Position	Club	Reason
Week 1	(United States) Jose Martinez	FW	Sacramento Gold	
Week 2	(United States) Eric Lopez	FW	North County Battalion	
Week 3	(England) Simon Rawnsley	FW	CD Aguiluchos USA	
Week 4	(United States) Cody Guthrie	FW	Portland Spartans FC	
Week 5	(United States) Matt Clare	MF	Albion SC Pros	
Week 6	(United States) Alberto "Tito" Anguiano	MF	FC Hasental	
Week 7	(Montenegro) Bljedi Bardic	FW	Clarkstown SC Eagles	
Week 8	(United States) James Stroud	GK	North County Battalion	
Week 9	(United States) Michael Creswick	FW	Kingston Stockade FC	
Week 10	(Spain) Jon Ander Ibarrondo	FW	Myrtle Beach Mutiny	
Week 11	(England) Simon Rawnsley	FW	CD Aguiluchos USA	
Week 12	(United States) Skye Harter	MF	AFC Cleveland	
Week 13	(United States) Evan De Ycaza	MF	Tobacco Road FC	
Week 14	(Colombia) Santiago Patiño	FW	Kraze United	
Week 15	(England) Luke Winter	FW	Chattanooga FC	

== Attendances ==
Teams with an average home attendance of at least 1,000:

Team	Home average
Detroit City FC	5,208
Grand Rapids FC	4,652
Chattanooga FC	4,294
Tulsa Athletics	3,457
Little Rock Rangers	1,866
