= Jon Burklo =

American soccer coach

Personal information
- Full name: Jonathan Burklo
- Date of birth: March 8, 1984 (age 42)
- Place of birth: Colorado, United States
- Height: 5 ft 10 in (1.78 m)
- Position: Defender

Team information
- Current team: Metropolitan Oval

Youth career
- 1998-2001: Wharton High School, FL

College career
Years	Team	Apps	(Gls)
2002-2005	Liberty University		

Senior career*
Years	Team	Apps	(Gls)
2005	Richmond Kickers Future	4	(0)
2006	Cincinnati Kings	0	(0)
2007	Atlantis	7	(2)
2007	RoPS	12	
2007	Jippo		
2008	Wilmington Hammerheads	9	(1)

Managerial career
- 2014: Corinthians FC of San Antonio
- 2023: El Paso Locomotive FC (assistant)
- 2024-: Metropolitan Oval (U19/U23)
- * Club domestic league appearances and goals

Jon Burklo (born March 8, 1984) is an American soccer coach.

Burklo is married and has a son and daughter. He was, formerly, the 1st assistant coach with El Paso Locomotive FC in the USL Championship. Prior to taking the position with El Paso Locomotive FC, he was the MLS Next Academy Director for RISE Soccer Club in Houston, Texas. Additionally, he has held coaching positions with Saint Louis FC Academy/St Louis Scott Gallagher as an academy coach and program director as well as having served as head coach for Corinthians FC of San Antonio in the NPSL for their inaugural season in 2014, helping the team to a South Central Conference Final appearance.

He played his club soccer with Black Watch. He went on to play soccer at Liberty University from 2002 to 2005. In 2005, he spent the collegiate off season with the Richmond Kickers Future of the fourth division Premier Development League. In 2006, he was on the roster with the Cincinnati Kings of the USL Second Division (now called USL League One), Burklo moved to Europe where he signed with Atlantis FC in the Finnish Ykkönen (Second Division) in January 2007. He had played seven games when the team announced it had no money to continue paying its players. Burklo was then released from the team and in April 2007, he signed a one-year contract with RoPS in the Ykkönen. On August 28, 2007, he moved to JIPPO back in the Ykkönen. In 2008, Burklo signed with the Wilmington Hammerheads (now USL League One of the USL Second Division. During the season, he also spent time with the D.C. United and Houston Dynamo reserve teams.

In 2024, he joined the Metropolitan Oval Academy, serving as both Technical Director of the academy and as the U19 MLS Next head coach as well as their U23 team that competes in The League for Clubs. The U23 team finished as 2025 The League for Clubs national champions with a penalty shootout win over Napa Valley 1839 FC. The team advanced to the national championship after winning the Northeast region and then defeating Tulsa Athletic in the semi-final
