= Kraze =

Kraze may refer to

- Kraze, a house music band produced by record executive Craig Kallman
- Central Florida United Kraze, a soccer team based in Lake Mary, Florida
- Kraze United, an Orlandoan soccer club
- Kražiai, also known as Kražē
