= Dallas City FC =

- Full name: Dallas City Football Club
- Nickname: DCFC
- Founded: 2013; 13 years ago
- Ground: DCFC McKinney Soccer Complex (McKinney, Texas)
- Owner: Jacob Serdar Tuygun
- Head Coach: Rahim Zafer
- League: National Premier Soccer League
- Website: http://dallascityfc.com

Dallas City FC (DCFC) is an American soccer club based in McKinney, Texas. DCFC competes in the National Premier Soccer League (NPSL) as a member of the Heartland Conference of the South Region. The club changed their name before beginning play in the NPSL. Early in 2017, it was announced that the club would no longer compete in the NPSL. However, when the 2017 season began, the NPSL listed DCFC in the standings in the place of Liverpool Warriors. The primary rival of DCFC in the NPSL is Fort Worth Vaqueros FC. The two clubs annually compete in a cup competition, the Trinity River Cup, which is a two-leg total goal series.

== Honors ==
- 2017 Trinity River Cup Champions
- 2016 Trinity River Cup Champions
- 2015 Trinity River Cup Champions
- 2014 East Dallas Cup Champions
- 2014 Trinity River Cup Champions
- 2014 South Region Runners-up
