= Virginia Atlantic FC =

- Full name: Virginia Atlantic Football Club
- Nickname: VAFC
- Founded: 2013; 13 years ago
- Stadium: Powhatan Field; Norfolk, Virginia
- Capacity: 2,800
- Owner: Steven Wagoner
- Head Coach: João Downs
- League: National Premier Soccer League
- Website: vbcityfc.com
Home colors

Virginia Atlantic Football Club is an American professional soccer club based in Norfolk, Virginia playing in the National Premier Soccer League (NPSL) in the Mid-Atlantic Conference of the Northeast Region. The club was founded in 2013 as Virginia Beach City FC and held its inaugural season in 2014 with their first regular season match on May 17.

Since their formation, they have finished in the top three in the Mid-Atlantic Conference every season. They won the title as the 2017 NPSL Mid-Atlantic Regular Season Champions with an undefeated season, as well as qualifying for two playoff seeds in 2015 and 2017. The club also partakes in the U.S. Open Cup competition via qualification, and did so in 2015.

Virginia Beach City FC announced November 26, 2018 it will upgrade its current semi-professional men's soccer team to field a professional men's soccer team in the National Premier Soccer League (NPSL) in 2019 joining the Richmond Kickers and Loudoun United as the only other professional soccer teams based in Virginia competing on a national stage. Virginia Beach City FC is the first soccer club in Hampton Roads to provide the full player development pyramid from youth and amateur to professional on a year-round basis. Virginia Beach City FC has a developmental affiliation with Major League Soccer's D.C. United.

== Branding ==
=== Crest ===
The centerpiece of the crest is Neptune's trident, inspired by the 34-foot cast bronze Neptune statue on the Virginia Beach boardwalk. The navy blue and gold are a nod to the city that is home to one of the United States' biggest naval bases. The insignia that recognizes Navy SEALs is a gold trident.

The crest was made by graphic designer Matthew Wolff, who has since designed the current crests for Los Angeles FC, New York City FC, Charleston Battery, Union Omaha, FC Tulsa, and Oakland Roots.

=== Jersey Sponsors ===
Period	Kit manufacturer	Shirt sponsor
2014–2020	Adidas	Savant
2021–Present	Adidas	---

On February 21, 2018, Virginia Beach City FC and Adidas announced an extension to their long-term partnership through 2021 making Adidas the official supplier for the club.

== Stadium ==
The team plays at the Powhatan Field which is a stadium built in 2005 and seats 2,800; located in Norfolk, Virginia. VB City FC moved to Powhatan Field on March 1, 2019; leaving its former home in Virginia Beach Sportsplex which had been home to the club since its inception. VB City cited the move was due to both aiming to become a more centralized club to the Hampton Roads area and the safety that the new turf at Powhatan Field provided to the players.

== Club culture ==
=== Supporters ===
Neptune's Armada are the local supporters for the club and can be seen attending matches and chanting songs for the whole ninety-minute duration of the match. The Armada has an affiliation with Virginia Beach's chapter of The American Outlaws. The group is led by long time City supporter Andrew Cowan.

=== Rivals ===
Playing in the Mid-Atlantic Conference, Virginia Beach City FC plays Charlottesville Alliance FC, FC Baltimore Christos, FC Frederick, First State FC, Maryland Bobcats FC, and Northern Virginia United FC year in and year out. Match ups with Northern Virginia United have been chippy between the two in recent years while FC Baltimore has been VB's toughest competition in the group. VB City FC also annually plays D.C. United U-23 as part of their affiliation with the Major League club.

=== Youth development ===
The Virginia Beach City FC U23/Reserves is the development team for the club. It is designed to develop players for the First Team squad, and with the objective of placing them in top collegiate programs. VB City FC established their boy's and girl's academy teams in the Fall 2016. The academies have quickly grown and have seen former academy players Julian Barrios depart for D.C. United's academy; eventually to Houston Dynamo's academy and Samuel Jones depart for Philadelphia Union's Academy and the United States U17 National Team.

== Ownership ==
NPSL Virginia Beach is led by owner Steven Wagoner. Wagoner is the founder and partner of Nexus Street, LLC, which is a privately held consulting and investment development company headquartered in Fairfax, Virginia. Wagoner founded Virginia Beach City FC. He previously owned and operated D.C. United's affiliate semi professional team, D.C. United U-23; in 2013 and 2014. Under his tenure, the team earned a Lamar Hunt US Open Cup Berth, NPSL Playoff Berth, and NPSL Mid Atlantic Conference Regular Season Championship Title. During the inaugural season, the team was coached by D.C. United legend, Jaime Moreno.

Wagoner serves on the Advisory Board for George Mason University’s Center for Sport Management; his alma mater where he received a B.S. Degree with concentrations in Sport Management and Business Administration. He was a member of the GMU NCAA Men’s Soccer Team - CAA Champion and NCAA Tournament berth which earned Top 20 National Rankings. Lastly, Steven Wagoner has served on the Board of Directors for the National Premier Soccer League since 2013.

== Broadcasting ==
The club first broadcast their matches to an online audience during the 2018 NPSL season. The last few home matches were streamed on the team's YouTube channel. In the spring of 2019, the league announced a deal with online soccer streaming platform, MyCujoo. Virginia Beach City FC has been streaming their matches on the website ever since.

== Current roster ==
Note: Flags indicate national team as defined under FIFA eligibility rules; some limited exceptions apply. Players may hold more than one non-FIFA nationality.

No.	Pos.	Nation	Player
12	MF	CZE	Christoph Kuttner
13	MF	USA	Gavin Page
4	DF	USA	Preston Bremus
15	FW	USA	Eli Carr
99	GK	PAN	Eduardo Barria
5	FW	USA	Joshua Condit
20	GK	USA	Christian Coulson
23	DF	USA	Zachary Johnson
17	FW	USA	Sharieff Stancil
27	DF	USA	Aaron Deans
1	GK	USA	Jack Desroches
7	FW	USA	Michael Schaefer

No.	Pos.	Nation	Player
6	MF	USA	Ryan Lachine
9	FW	USA	Ryan Mahon
—	MF	ESP	Eric Villa
8	MF	USA	Alexander Moody
28	FW	USA	Liam Moore
34	MF	USA	Everett Mccloskey
26	DF	USA	Arnold Rutkauskas
39	MF	USA	Timmy Barlow
18	FW	USA	Brady Wise
7	FW	GER	Tamin Strein
3	DF	USA	Trey Pope
11	FW	USA	Henry Moore

Source: Virginia Beach City FC Roster

== Team management ==
Name	Nat	Tenure
Brian Hinkey	USA	2013–2020
Samuel Barnett	USA	2021–

== Year by year ==
Year	League	Region	Conference	Pld	W	L	D	Pts	Pos	Playoffs	U.S. Open Cup
2014	NPSL	Northeast	Mid-Atlantic	10	6	1	3	21	2nd	Conference Runners-Up	—
2015	NPSL	Northeast	Mid-Atlantic	10	5	2	3	18	3rd	did not qualify	Second round
2016	NPSL	Northeast	Mid-Atlantic	10	5	2	3	18	3rd	did not qualify	did not qualify
2017	NPSL	Northeast	Mid-Atlantic	6	3	0	3	12	1st	Conference semifinals	did not qualify
2018	NPSL	Northeast	Mid-Atlantic	10	4	4	2	14	4th	did not qualify	did not qualify
2019	NPSL	Northeast	Mid-Atlantic	8	6	1	1	19	1st	Conference Final	did not qualify
2020	NPSL	East	Mid-Atlantic	season cancelled due to COVID-19 pandemic							did not qualify
2021	NPSL	East	Mid-Atlantic	10	2	6	2	10	4th	did not qualify	did not qualify
2022	NPSL	East	Mid-Atlantic	9	5	1	3	18	2nd	Conference semifinals	

== Honors ==
National Premier Soccer League

- Mid-Atlantic Conference
  - Regular Season Champions: 2017
