= Tampa Bay Rowdies U23 =

American soccer team

- Full name: Tampa Bay Rowdies U23
- Nickname: Rowdies
- Founded: 2017 (first edition); 2020 (re-founded)
- Stadium: Al Lang Stadium; St. Petersburg, Florida
- Capacity: 7,500
- Head coach: Andres Arango
- League: USL League Two
- Website: https://www.rowdiessoccer.com/
Home colors	Away colors	Third colors

The Tampa Bay Rowdies U23 were an American semi-professional soccer team based in St. Petersburg, Florida. They were the reserve club of USL Championship club Tampa Bay Rowdies.

The club is part of the Rowdies Youth Network, which consists of the U23 team in League Two, Rowdies Women (run in partnership with Pinellas County United SC), and the Tampa Bay United Rowdies Development Academy (run in partnership with Tampa Bay United).

In 2016, the Rowdies operated a team called Tampa Bay Rowdies 2 in the NPSL. This team was replaced by the U23s the following year.

== History ==
=== Prior editions ===
In December 2015, the Rowdies announced that they would begin fielding a developmental team in the National Premier Soccer League for the 2016 season and that the club would be called Rowdies 2. The original Tampa Bay Rowdies had fielded a similarly named reserve/developmental squad from 1982 to 1983, but used Roman numerals to dub them Rowdies II. Rowdies 2 competed in the Sunshine Conference of the South Region of NPSL, finishing in fourth place with a record of four wins, four losses, and two draws. The team disbanded in 2016.

In February 2017, The Rowdies announced that they would field a U23 team in the USL's Premier Development League, with Rowdies U23 set to join the league this for 2017 PDL season, playing in the Southeast Division in the Southern Conference. The majority of the roster had ties to the Tampa Bay and Florida area. They played their first match on May 27 against Weston FC. The team went 3-8-3 in conference play and finished sixth out of nine teams. The team did not return for the 2018 season.

=== Current edition ===
On January 15, 2020, USL League Two (formerly the PDL) announced that the Rowdies would be re-launching the U23 for the 2020 USL League Two season, however, the season was cancelled due to the COVID-19 pandemic. The team was to play in the Southeast Division once again, play its games as Al Lang Stadium, and will be coached by former Rowdies player Andres Arango. The team is a partnership between the USL Rowdies and Chargers SC.

However, they never played as the 2020 season was cancelled due to the COVID-19 pandemic. In 2021, they were replaced in USL2 by Tampa Bay United, who are also an affiliate of the Rowdies.

== Year-by-year ==
Tampa Bay Rowdies 2

Year	League	Regular season	Playoffs	U.S. Open Cup
2016	NPSL	4th, Sunshine Conference	Did not qualify	Ineligible

Tampa Bay Rowdies U23

Year	League	Regular season	Playoffs	U.S. Open Cup
2017	PDL	6th, Southeast Division	Did not qualify	Ineligible
2018	No team fielded			
2019	No team fielded			
2020	USL2	Season cancelled due to COVID-19 pandemic		
