= Corinthians FC of San Antonio =

Soccer club in Texas, U.S.

The Corinthians FC of San Antonio
- Nicknames: The Corinthians FC, Corinthians
- Founded: 2009; 17 years ago
- Stadium: UTSA PARK WEST
- Capacity: 2,000
- Owner: Arturo Ferrer
- CEO: Humberto G
- Head Coach: Mario Trejo
- League: UPSL
- 2025: CHAMPIONS
- Website: corinthiansfcsa.com
Home colors

The Corinthians FC of San Antonio is a club (Non-Profit) based in San Antonio, Texas. Founded in 2009, the club is dedicated to player development and serving the soccer community in San Antonio and the surrounding areas. As of Fall 2026, The Corinthians FC of San Antonio competes in the SALSA

The club is led by President of Corinthians International Sports Academy Arturo Ferrer, CEO Humberto G with Alejandro Padua serving as Sporting Director and Mauricio G. The organization operates youth development programs and maintains international relationships focused on creating sporting and development opportunities for players in San Antonio.

== History ==
=== 2014 ===
The Corinthians FC won its first ever NPSL game on May 17, 2014 - a 4-2 away win over the Liverpool Warriors. They would finish their inaugural season with a 7-0-3 record, finishing 1st in the South Division and 3rd overall in the South Central Conference regular season table. In the playoffs, Corinthians made it to the South Central Conference Championship game where they lost to Tulsa Athletics, 4-2.

=== 2016 ===
On January 16, 2016, Benjamin Galindo was appointed the new head coach of The Corinthians FC. Galindo is a former player on the Mexico national team and Chivas Guadalajara coach. The club made its first appearance in the Lamar Hunt U.S. Open Cup during the 2016 tournament. The team was selected as an "At-Large Berth" on February 5, 2016.

=== 2017 ===
The Corinthians FC did not participate in the 2017 NPSL season as the team ceased operations.

=== 2022 ===
In 2022 the team returned to the National Premier Soccer League and made it to the final of the Lone Star Conference Playoffs, losing 3-0 to Laredo Heat SC.

=== 2025 ===
In 2025 The Corinthians returned to the United Premier Soccer League and made it to the final of the Texas Central Conference Playoffs, winning 6-0 to Lake Travis FC. UNIVISION 41 THE CORINTHIANS FC VS LAKE TRAVIS

=== 2026 ===
The Corinthians FC of San Antonio evolved into The Dreams FC for its U13–U19 competitive categories as part of a synergy with Grupo Pachuca. The Corinthians name remained as the club’s developmental academy, focused on the formation of players from ages 6 to 12. This restructuring created a pathway in which younger players begin their development within the Corinthians academy before progressing into The Dreams FC at the U13 level.

== Stadium ==
The team played at UTSA Park West in San Antonio, Texas.

== Year-by-year ==
| Year | Division | League | Regular season | Playoffs | U.S. Open Cup |
|---|---|---|---|---|---|
| 2014 | 4 | NPSL | 3rd, South Central | Conference Final | Did not qualify |
| 2015 | 4 | NPSL | 2nd, South Central | Did not qualify | Did not qualify |
| 2016 | 4 | NPSL | 8th, South Central | Did not qualify | Second round |
| 2019 | Spring | UPSL | 2nd, Texas | Did not qualify | Did not enter |
| 2019 | Fall | UPSL | 4th, Texas Heart | Did not qualify | Did not enter |
| 2020 | Spring | UPSL | COVID-19 | N/A | COVID–19 |
| 2020 | Fall | UPSL | 6th, Texas Heart | N/A | COVID–19 |
| 2022 | 4 | NPSL | 3rd, Lone Star Conference | Conference Final | Did not qualify |
| 2023 | 4 | NPSL | 4th, Lone Star Conference | Conference Semifinals | Did not qualify |
| 2024 | Spring | UPSL | 3rd, Texas Central | Round of 16 | Did not enter |
| 2024 | Fall | UPSL | 4th, Texas Central | Conference Semifinals | Did not enter |
| 2025 | 4 | TLC | 5th, Texas Conference | Conference Semifinals | Did not qualify |
| 2025 | 1 | UPSL | 1st, Texas Central Conference | Champions | Did not qualify |

== Honors ==
=== Domestic League ===
- National Premier Soccer League
  - South Region - South Central Conference
    - Runner-Up: 2014, 2015
