= Tulsa Athletic =

- Full name: Tulsa Athletic
- Nickname: The A's
- Founded: 2013; 13 years ago
- Stadium: Athletic Community Field at Hicks Park
- Owners: Sonny Dalesandro; Thomas J. Kern
- Head coach: Jason Rogers
- League: TLFC
- 2023: NPSL National Champions
- Website: tulsaathletic.com
Home colors	Away colors

Tulsa Athletic is an American soccer team and are based in Tulsa, Oklahoma, United States. The 2023 NPSL National Champion, 2013 was their inaugural season in the National Premier Soccer League (NPSL), which is a national league at the fourth tier of the American soccer pyramid. They compete in the NPSL's Heartland Conference. The team maintains amateur status under NPSL rules, allowing college players to participate without losing their collegiate eligibility. The club currently plays at Athletic Community Field at Hicks Park since the 2022 season, having previously played at Veterans Park (2018–21), LaFortune Stadium (2017) and Drillers Stadium (2013–16), the former home of the Tulsa Drillers baseball team.

On May 20, 2024, Tulsa Athletic were suspended from the NPSL, meaning that they wouldn't defend their title. On July 31 they announced that they would leave the NPSL in order to start their own amateur league entitled "The League for Clubs", with Athletic being founding members alongside Atlantic City FC, FC Davis, Kingston Stockade FC and Napa Valley 1839 FC.

== Crest and colors ==
The green that Athletic wears is symbolic of "green country", the moniker given to the area of Oklahoma where Tulsa sits. The gold in the pinstripes that appear on the home kit (and are the dominant color of the away kit) represents trophies, championships, and victory. The crest is a pink shield featuring a unicorn facing a lion surrounding a soccer ball, symbolizing both strength and magic. The pink color of the crest is designed to illustrate the heart. The badge's location over the heart on the jersey signifies that all who wear the crest (players and fans alike) share the same heart.

== Support ==
A supporters group associated with Tulsa Athletic are the Athletics Armory, who congregate behind the north goal at home matches.

Fans have given the team several unofficial nicknames, including "the A's" and "The Foxes", named after 'Lester', a lone fox who resides in the team's stadium.

== Rivalries ==
In 2014 Oklahoma City FC left PDL to join the NPSL, which created an in-state rivalry. The two clubs separated by just 100 miles played in the OK Derby.

The inaugural Red River Cup was contested in May 2014. Four clubs (Fort Worth Vaqueros, Liverpool Warriors, Oklahoma City FC) met in a two-day tournament hosted by Tulsa, who won the title over Oklahoma City FC.

Oklahoma City 1889 FC joined the NPSL in 2021 which resulted in another in-state rivalry, with supporters choosing the name “The War for I-44.”

A crosstown derby against FC Tulsa was established in 2022 through the U.S. Open Cup nicknamed the Tulsa Derby.

=== Tulsa Derby ===
Record
W	D	L	GF	GA
1	0	2	2	3

Date	Competition	Winner	Score	Location
March 18, 2025	U.S. Open Cup	FC Tulsa	0–1	Hicks Park
April 5, 2023	U.S. Open Cup	Tulsa Athletic	1–0	Hicks Park
April 5, 2022	U.S. Open Cup	FC Tulsa	1–2	ONEOK Field

=== War for I-44 ===
Won	Drawn	Lost	GF	GA
10	1	4	30	17

Results
Date	Competition	Winner	Score	Location
June 25, 2025	TLFC	OKC 1889	0–2	Oklahoma City, OK
June 11, 2025	TLFC	Tulsa Athletic	2–0	Tulsa, OK
May 31, 2025	TLFC	Tulsa Athletic	2–1	Oklahoma City, OK
May 10, 2025	TLFC	OKC 1889	1–2	Tulsa, OK
June 19, 2024	Friendly	(draw)	0–0	Oklahoma City, OK
June 12, 2024	Friendly	Tulsa Athletic	2–1	Tulsa, OK
July 15, 2023	NPSL Playoffs	Tulsa Athletic	2–1	Claremore, OK
June 17, 2023	NPSL	Tulsa Athletic	2–1	Claremore, OK
May 24, 2023	NPSL	OKC 1889	0–1	Oklahoma City, OK
July 16, 2022	NPSL Playoffs	Tulsa Athletic	5–1	Tulsa, OK
July 16, 2022	NPSL	Tulsa Athletic	5–1	Tulsa, OK
May 25, 2022	NPSL	Tulsa Athletic	3–0	Oklahoma City, OK
July 14, 2021	NPSL Playoffs	Tulsa Athletic	2–2 (5–4 p)	Tulsa, OK
June 27, 2021	NPSL	Tulsa Athletic	2–0	Edmond, OK
May 16, 2021	NPSL	OKC 1889	1–3	Tulsa, OK

== Current squad ==
As of April 2023

Note: Flags indicate national team as defined under FIFA eligibility rules; some limited exceptions apply. Players may hold more than one non-FIFA nationality.

No.	Pos.	Nation	Player
1	GK	USA	Bryson Reed
2	DF	USA	Chris Taylor
3	MF	USA	Jonathan Harris
4	DF	USA	Rio Ramirez
5	DF	USA	Alejandro Chavez
6	MF	BRA	Vinicius Oliveira
7	FW	SRB	Stefan Cvetanović
9	FW	USA	Aaron Ugbah
10	FW	ENG	Jordan Watson
11	MF	USA	Roman Torres

No.	Pos.	Nation	Player
11	FW	USA	Titus Grant
13	DF	MEX	Javo Reyes
17	MF	USA	Joe Garcia
18	MF	USA	Mitchell Cashion
19	MF	MEX	Ruben Torres
20	MF	USA	Ciaran Winters
21	DF	USA	Joe Ruiz
22	MF	GAB	Aboubakr Diallo
23	MF	BRA	Riolan Mello
25	GK	USA	Brady Moody

== Year-by-year ==
As of October 4, 2026

Year	Division	League	Regular season	W-D-L (GF-GA)	Playoffs	W-D-L (GF-GA)	U.S. Open Cup	W-D-L (GF-GA)	National Amateur Cup	W-D-L (GF-GA)
2013	4	NPSL	1st, South Central	10–2–0 (44–9)	South Region Semifinal	0–0–1 (0–0)	did not qualify		Did not play	
2014	4	NPSL	1st, South Central	9–0–1 (46–13)	South Region Final	3–0–1 (14–6)	2nd Round	0–0–1 (0–2)	Did not play	
2015	4	NPSL	3rd, South Central	7–3–4 (52–33)	did not qualify		1st Round	0–0–1 (1–3)	Did not play	
2016	4	NPSL	1st, South Central	11–0–1 (38–9)	South Central Conference Final	1–0–1 (5–3)	did not qualify		Did not play	
2017	4	NPSL	2nd, Heartland	5–1–4 (25–16)	Heartland Conference Final	1–0–1 (2–5)	1st Round	0–0–1 (1–1) (Note: Lost on Penalties)	Did not play	
2018	4	NPSL	3rd, Heartland	6–0–4 (26–17)	Heartland Conference Semifinal	0–0–1 (0–1)	did not qualify		Did not play	
2019	4	NPSL	1st, Heartland	7–3–0 (24–8)	South Region Final	3–0–1 (12–7)	did not qualify		Did not play	
2020	4	UPSL	1st, Central-North	13–0–1 (60–11)	Central Region Semifinal	1–0–1 (4–4)	not held		Did not play	
2021	4	NPSL	2nd, Heartland	6–3–1 (32–9)	NPSL National Championship Runner Up	4–0–1 (8–9)	not held		Did not play	
2022	4	NPSL	1st, Heartland	9–2–1 (36–10)	NPSL National Semifinal	4–0–1 (8–3)	2nd Round	1–0–1 (4–2)	Did not play	
2023	4	NPSL	1st, Heartland	7-2-1 (23-8)	NPSL National Champions	6-0-0 (15-6)	3rd Round	2–0–1 (2–3)	Region III Final	2-1-2 (10-14)
2024	4	– (Note: Tulsa Athletic planned to participate in the NPSL in 2024, but they were suspended on May 20.)	–	3-2-0 (11-3)	American Champions Cup Winners	1-0-0 (2-1)	1st Round	0–0–1 (1-4)	Did not play	
2025	4	The League for Clubs	1st, Mid-American Conference	6–2–2 (20–7)	National Semifinals	1–0–2 (6–4)	1st Round	0–0–1 (0–1)	Did not play	–
2026	4	The League for Clubs	2nd, Mid-American Conference	5–1–4 (20–13)	Conference Finals	1–0–1 (3–2)	2nd qualifying round	1–0–1 (10–5)	Did not play	–
2027							2nd qualifying round	0–0–1 (2–1)		

=== All time Table ===
As of September 15, 2025

Match Type	Played	Won	Drawn	Lost	GF	GA	GD	Win %
Regular Season	139	99	20	20	437	153	+284	71.22
Playoffs	35	25	0	10	76	48	+28	71.43
U.S. Open Cup	11	4	0	7	15	16	−1	36.36
National Amateur Cup	5	2	1	2	10	14	−4	40.00
Total	190	132	20	38	538	232	+306	69.47

== Head coaches ==
- Includes all competitive matches: regular season, playoffs, and open cup.

As of March 18, 2025

Coach	Nationality	Start	End	Games	Win	Draw	Loss	GF	GA	GD	Win %
Joey Ryan	United States	2013	2019	95	63	9	23	290	133	+157	66.32
Levi Coleman	United States	2020	2023	50	38	5	7	152	48	+104	76.00
Jason Rogers	United States	2023	Present	25	17	3	5	50	32	+18	68.00

== Honors ==
=== Club ===
- USASA
  - American Champions Cup Champions (1): 2024
- NPSL
  - National Champions (1): 2023
  - National Runners-Up (1): 2021
- NPSL Midwest Region
  - Champions (1): 2023
- NPSL South Region
  - Champions (2): 2021, 2022
    - Runners-Up (2): 2014, 2019
- NPSL South-Central Conference
  - Champions (2): 2013, 2014
- NPSL Heartland Conference
  - Champions (4): 2019, 2021, 2022, 2023
  - Regular Season Shield (3): 2019, 2022, 2023
- Red River Cup
  - Champions (1): 2014
- UPSL Central Conference-North Division
  - Champions (1): 2020

Year	Honor
2013	South-Central Conference Champions
2014	South-Central Conference Champions
2014	South Region Runners-Up
2014	Red River Cup Champions
2019	Heartland Conference Shield
2019	Heartland Conference Champions
2019	South Region Runners-Up
2020	Central Conference-North Division Champions
2021	Heartland Conference Champions
2021	South Region Champions
2021	National Championship Runners-Up
2022	Heartland Conference Shield
2022	Heartland Conference Champions
2022	South Region Champions
2023	Heartland Conference Shield
2023	Heartland Conference Champions
2023	Midwest Region Champions
2023	NPSL National Champions
2024	American Champions Cup Winners

=== Individual ===
Year	Player	Position	Honor
2016	Dave Leung	Forward	Supporters' XI – First Team
2016	Terence Smith	Defender	Supporters' XI – Second Team
2017	Joe Garcia	Midfielder	South Region Best XI
2018	Damieon Thomas	Forward	Heartland Conference XI
2018	Declan Fitzpatrick	Midfielder	Heartland Conference XI
2019	Aboubakr Diallo	Forward	Heartland Conference XI
2019	Joseph Ruiz	Midfielder	Heartland Conference XI
2019	Gustavo Vargas	Defender	Heartland Conference XI
2019	Joey Ryan	Manager	Heartland Conference XI
2019	Joseph Ruiz	Midfielder	South Region XI
2019	Gustavo Vargas	Defender	South Region XI
2020	Santiago Riveros	Midfielder	UPSL Central Best XI
2020	Hunter Harrison	Goalkeeper	UPSL Central Best XI
2021	Aboubakr Diallo	Forward	Heartland Conference XI
2021	Joseph Garcia	Midfielder	Heartland Conference XI
2021	Joseph Ruiz	Defender	Heartland Conference XI
2021	Levi Coleman	Manager	Heartland Conference XI
2021	Levi Coleman	Manager	South Region XI
2021	Levi Coleman	Manager	National XI
2021	Levi Coleman	Manager	NPSL Coach of the Season
2022	Reed Berry	Forward	Heartland Conference XI
2022	Vinicius De Oliveira	Midfielder	Heartland Conference XI
2022	Joseph Ruiz	Defender	Heartland Conference XI
2021	Levi Coleman	Manager	Heartland Conference XI
2022	Joseph Ruiz	Defender	South Region XI
2023	Aboubakr Diallo	Forward	Heartland Conference XI
2023	Rio Mello	Midfielder	Heartland Conference XI
2023	Vitor Turnes	Defender	Heartland Conference XI
2023	Bryson Reed	Goalkeeper	Heartland Conference XI
2023	Aboubakr Diallo	Forward	Midwest Region XI
2023	Vitor Turnes	Midfield	Midwest Region XI
2023	Bryson Reed	Goalkeeper	Midwest Region XI
2023	Aboubakr Diallo	Forward	National XI

== Records ==
- Biggest win: 13–0 vs BCS Clash, May 11, 2014
- First win: vs Liverpool Warriors, May 18, 2013
- 50th win: vs Demize NPSL, May 19, 2018
- 100th win: vs Laredo Heat, July 20, 2022
- First goal: Omar Mata vs Liverpool Warriors, May 18, 2013
- 100th goal: Damieon Thomas vs Corinthians FC of San Antonio, July 13, 2014
- 250th goal: Gustavo Vargas vs Demize NPSL, June 24, 2018
