= Fort Worth Vaqueros FC =

Soccer club based in Fort Worth, Texas

- Full name: Fort Worth Vaqueros Futbol Club
- Founded: 2013; 13 years ago
- Stadium: Doskocil Stadium; Fort Worth, Texas
- Capacity: 4,560
- Owner: Playbook Management
- Manager: Anthony Harris
- Coach: Men's Tony Merola
- League: USL League Two
- 2025: National Premier Soccer League; Lone Star Conference: 4th of 7; Playoffs: Conference semifinals
- Website: fortworthvaqueros.com
Home colors

Fort Worth Vaqueros Futbol Club is a soccer club based in Fort Worth, Texas in the Dallas–Fort Worth metroplex. Owned by Playbook Management International, LLC and other investors, the club competes in the Ranger Division of USL League Two, an amateur league in the United States league system. It commenced play in the National Premier Soccer League, where it played for eleven seasons until its move to USL League Two in 2026. Its home ground is Doskocil Stadium at Nolan Catholic High School.

== History ==
The club was launched in 2013 and began play in the National Premier Soccer League (NPSL) in May 2014. The team's name was announced at the Fort Worth Livestock Exchange Building on February 13, 2014, after a name the team contest. The team's official logo was selected by the fans then revealed by the team on March 20, 2014. The Vaqueros played its inaugural 2014 season at historic LaGrave Field but had to relocate in 2015 after the Fort Worth Cats, from whom the Vaqueros had been subletting the field, lost their lease.

On January 1, 2015, Vaqueros owner Michael Hitchcock and the newly formed Legend Football Partners acquired a significant interest in English soccer club Alfreton Town F.C. From this acquisition, Fort Worth Vaqueros formed a partnership with the English club, creating an avenue for player sharing, cross marketing, international matches and preseason training in both countries. "This move automatically makes the Vaqueros a stronger organization through the benefits of sharing players, training techniques, matches and the collaboration of ideas from two different soccer nations," said Hitchcock. In August 2015, Hitchcock's Playbook Management International expanded the Vaqueros family ties by acquiring a stake in Tobago FC Phoenix 1976.

In 2018 the club launched their high performance Academy which serves as the nonprofit arm of the organization and is dedicated to developing the next generation of soccer players in their community. The Academy operates as a competitive, high-performance boys program, providing players with a training environment alongside talented youth players in the area.

Their Academy teams compete against many of the top clubs throughout North Texas and are led by professional coaches who provide a high level of training and player development—all without coaching fees. By removing the financial barrier of traditional club soccer, the Academy purports to creates an opportunity for talented players from across the community, regardless of their family's economic circumstances.

In 2024, the club launched their official Youth Club, which provides players throughout Fort Worth and the surrounding communities with the opportunity to learn and develop their soccer skills under the guidance of top-level coaches. The Vaqueros programs are designed to support players at every ability level.

=== Fort Worth Vaqueras ===
Launched in 2025, the Fort Worth Vaqueras, to establish a premier women’s soccer program in Fort Worth and provide female athletes with a pathway to compete at a high level. The Vaqueras began competition in the Women’s Premier Soccer League (WPSL), joining the competitive Lone Star Conference for their inaugural season and establishing the foundation for the future of women’s soccer in Fort Worth.

The team is led by Mexican goalkeeper Sergio Bernal, a longtime Pumas UNAM standout who played more than 500 matches for the historic Liga MX club.

The team represents an important investment in women’s soccer in Fort Worth, providing players with a professional club environment while giving the community the opportunity to support and experience high-level women’s soccer close to home.

== Culture ==
=== Supporters ===
Playing at the historic LaGrave Field, the Vaqueros welcomed 2,700 fans to their first home game and had an average attendance of 2,000 fans during the 2014 season. The main supporters group for the Vaqueros is named the Panther City Hellfire, a name taken from a historic Fort Worth nickname. The Vaqueros have a close connection with their fans, involving them in the evolution and growth of the club. When the team was created and needed a name and logo, the club allowed the fan community to create, submit and vote on what both of these aspects would look like. Many names were submitted, but the final decision was between Fort Worth United, Fort Worth Vaqueros FC and Panther City FC, with Fort Worth Vaqueros FC ultimately being selected. Vaqueros season ticket holders do not receive paper tickets to the games, but instead receive a free team jersey that they wear to each game as their ticket into the game. The club supporters come mainly from the city of Fort Worth and the surrounding Metroplex communities.

=== Rivalries ===
When the Vaqueros entered the NPSL, they had an instant rival in Dallas City FC. With the teams in close proximity to each other in the Dallas–Fort Worth metroplex, there is a natural rivalry between the two clubs. In addition to their conference play, the Vaqueros play a two leg cup series against Dallas City. The name of this cup was selected by both teams' fans, from the DFW area through social media. The Vaqueros lost the first Trinity River Cup to Dallas City FC in 2014, suffering a 2–0 loss in the first leg and a 1–0 loss in the second leg. Beginning in 2016, the Vaqueros began a two-leg (non-league) series with Shreveport Rafters FC, called the Texas Trail Classic. Shreveport won the inaugural cup. In 2019, the Chisholm Trail Clásico began, pitting the Vaqueros against Denton Diablos FC.

== Stadium ==
The club is based at Doskocil Stadium at Nolan Catholic High School. The NPSL team began play at LaGrave Field and later played at Farrington Field, a facility owned by the Fort Worth Independent School District.

== Team ==
=== Coaching staff ===
- Head coach: Tony Merola
- Assistant coach: McKane Rogers
- Assistant coach: Joseph Cervantes
- Academy Executive Director: Mark Snell
- Youth Club Executive Director:

=== Head coaches ===
- Mark Snell (2014–2016)
- Nick Stavrou (2017–2019)
- Sergio Franklin (2020–2021)
- Tony Merola (2022–present)

== Seasons ==
List of Fort Worth Vaqueros FC seasons
| Season | League | Pld | W | D | L | GF | GA | GD | Pos | Playoffs | USOC | Ref |
|---|---|---|---|---|---|---|---|---|---|---|---|---|
| 2014 | NPSL | 10 | 2 | 1 | 7 | 23 | 24 | –1 | 7th of 8 | DNQ | DNQ | |
| 2015 | NPSL | 14 | 3 | 5 | 6 | 21 | 35 | –14 | 6th of 8 | DNQ | DNQ | |
| 2016 | NPSL | 12 | 1 | 1 | 10 | 11 | 38 | –27 | 11th of 11 | DNQ | DNQ | |
| 2017 | NPSL | 10 | 7 | 1 | 2 | 17 | 8 | +9 | 1st of 6 | Conference semi-finals | DNQ | |
| 2018 | NPSL | 10 | 6 | 2 | 2 | 26 | 17 | +9 | 4th of 9 | Conference semi-finals | 1R | |
| 2019 | NPSL | 12 | 7 | 3 | 2 | 26 | 14 | +12 | 3rd of 7 | Regional semi-finals | DNQ | |
| 2020 | RL | 7 | 3 | 2 | 2 | 11 | 9 | +2 | 5th of 8 | DNQ | Q (Note: The club qualified for the 2020 and 2021 editions of the U.S. Open Cup, which were both cancelled due to the COVID-19 pandemic in the United States.) | |
| 2021 | NPSL | 10 | 0 | 1 | 9 | 12 | 35 | –23 | 8th of 8 | DNQ | Q | |
| 2022 | NPSL | 12 | 3 | 1 | 8 | 17 | 25 | –8 | 8th of 10 | DNQ | DNQ | |
| 2023 | NPSL | 11 | 4 | 0 | 7 | 17 | 30 | –13 | 7th of 11 | DNQ | DNQ | |
| 2024 | NPSL | 10 | 0 | 2 | 8 | 9 | 34 | –25 | 8th of 8 | DNQ | DNQ | |
| 2025 | NPSL | 10 | 5 | 0 | 5 | 20 | 21 | –1 | 4th of 7 | Conference semi-finals | DNQ | |
| 2026 | USL2 | 12 | 0 | 0 | 12 | 4 | 41 | -37 | 6th of 6 | did not qualify | DNQ | |

== Sponsors ==
| Year | Kit manufacturer | Sponsor |
|---|---|---|
| 2014 | (Germany) Puma | Hispano Exito |
| 2015 | (Germany) Puma | Tarrant County College |
| 2016 | (United States) UN1TUS | Chimera Brewing Company |
| 2017 | (United States) UN1TUS | Zadeh Law Firm |
| 2018 | (Germany) Puma | Fort Worth Weekly |
| 2019 | (Germany) Puma | Pinnacle Bank |
| 2020 | (Germany) Puma | Fort Worth Police Officers Association |
| 2021 | (Germany) Puma | Sidral Mundet |
| 2022 | (Germany) Puma | US Army |
| 2023 | (Germany) Puma | The Chat Room Pub |
| 2024 | (Germany) Puma | The Rabbit Hole Pub |
| 2025 | (Germany) Puma | Astoria Crossing |
| 2026 | (Germany) Puma | Zadeh Law Firm |
