= Ryan Arambula =

American soccer player

Personal information
- Date of birth: December 19, 1993 (age 32)
- Place of birth: Myrtle Beach, South Carolina, United States
- Height: 5 ft 7 in (1.70 m)
- Position: Defensive midfielder

Youth career
- 2008–2012: Charleston Battery

College career
Years	Team	Apps	(Gls)
2012–2015	South Carolina Gamecocks	61	(3)

Senior career*
Years	Team	Apps	(Gls)
2016	Myrtle Beach Mutiny	0	(0)
2017–2018	Charleston Battery	6	(0)
- * Club domestic league appearances and goals as of 22:25, 14 October 2018 (UTC)

Ryan Arambula (born December 19, 1993) is an American soccer player.

== Career ==
Arambula played fours years of college soccer at the University of South Carolina, where he made 61 appearances for the Gamecocks, scoring 3 goals and tallying 12 assists.

Arambula also played with USL PDL side Myrtle Beach Mutiny, appearing for them in a fixture against Charlotte Eagles in the Lamar Hunt US Open Cup on May 11, 2016.

Rittmeyer signed with United Soccer League club Charleston Battery on March 21, 2017. He made his professional league debut as an injury time substitute in a 1–1 draw with Penn FC on April 21, 2018.
