= Ricardio Morris =

Barbadian footballer

Personal information
- Full name: Ricardo Morris
- Date of birth: 24 April 1993 (age 33)
- Place of birth: Kingsland, Barbados
- Height: 1.81 m (5 ft 11 in)
- Position: Defender

Team information
- Current team: Tulsa Athletic

Senior career*
| Years | Team | Apps | (Gls) |
| 2014–2016 | Barbados Defence Force | | |
| 2017– | Tulsa Athletic | | |

International career^{‡}
| 2012– | Barbados | 56 | (1) |
- * Club domestic league appearances and goals as of 17:05, 4 February 2018 (UTC) ‡ National team caps and goals as of 08:19, 16 June 2026 (UTC)

Ricardio Morris (born 24 April 1993) is a Barbadian international footballer who plays for Tulsa Athletic, as a defender.

== Career ==
Morris has played club football for Barbados Defence Force and Tulsa Athletic, and made his international debut for Barbados in 2012.

=== International goals ===
Scores and results list Barbados's goal tally first.

| No. | Date | Venue | Opponent | Score | Result | Competition |
|---|---|---|---|---|---|---|
| 1. | 5 September 2014 | Stade Alfred Marie-Jeanne, Rivière-Pilote, Martinique | Martinique | 1–0 | 2–3 | 2014 Caribbean Cup qualification |
