= City of Angels FC =

- Full name: City of Angels Football Club
- Nickname(s): The Underdogs, The People’s Club
- Founded: 2017; 8 years ago
- Ground: Calabasas High School
- Owner: PJ Harrison; Joe Sumner
- League: National Premier Soccer League
- Website: http://www.cityofangelsfc.la/

City Of Angels FC is a Los Angeles area men's soccer club based in the San Fernando Valley in Los Angeles, California. They most recently played in the National Premier Soccer League.

== History ==
The foundation of City of Angels FC was announced on January 1, 2017. Its owners are PJ Harrison and Joe Sumner. In July 2017, the club announced Cobi Jones had joined as Director of Football.

The club was established with a view to help an underserviced soccer community in the San Fernando Valley, in particular providing access to affordable youth soccer and creating a pathway to the professional game.

In July 2017, the club partnered with Manchester United and the Manchester United Foundation to host free youth clinics in San Fernando Valley.

The club's badge was created by LA streetwear brand Undefeated.

=== Front Office ===
- (United Kingdom) PJ Harrison – Co-founder
- (United Kingdom) Joe Sumner – Co-founder
