= Shreveport Rafters FC =

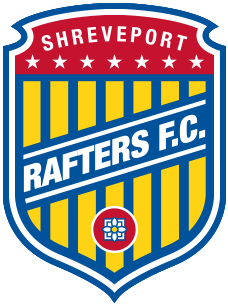
- Full name: Shreveport Rafters Futbol Club
- Nickname(s): Rafters FC
- Founded: 2016; 9 years ago
- Stadium: Independence Stadium
- Capacity: 49,565
- Owner: Montgomery Cole
- Head Coach: Greg Palmer
- Website: https://raftersfc.com/
Home colors	Away colors

Shreveport Rafters FC was a soccer team based in Shreveport, Louisiana. Founded in 2016, the team most recently played in the National Premier Soccer League (NPSL), a national semi-professional league at the fourth tier of the American Soccer Pyramid. The team plays its home games at Independence Stadium. The team's colors are blue, white, and yellow, based on the city's flag.

== History ==
In 2015, Shreveport-based brothers announced they would be bringing the first professional soccer team in the history of the city. The team is named for the infamous Great Raft log jam which clogged the Red and Atchafalaya Rivers from the 1100s to early 1900s.

Rafters FC played their inaugural season in 2016, garnering an 8–7–3 record.

Rafters FC debuted a customized jersey that became a viral sensation in soccer media as it featured a printed seersucker jacket and pink bowtie.

== Stadium ==
Rafters FC currently play their home matches at Independence Stadium. They previously played at Graf Orthodontics Field at Messmer Stadium, a local stadium used primarily for high school sporting events and community events. Max capacity of the stadium is estimated at 3,500 with the Rafters averaging 2,000–3,000 in attendance each match for the 2016 season.

== Year-by-year ==
Year	Conference	League	Regular season	Avg. attendance	Playoffs	Open Cup
2016	South Central	NPSL	7th, 8–7–3	2,000–3,000	Divisional Semifinals	Did not qualify
2017	Lonestar	NPSL	5th, 3–1–3	2,000–3,000		

== Coaches ==
As of October 23, 2016.

- Head coach (United States) Phil Bohn (2018–present)
- Head coach (England) Greg Palmer (2016–2018)
  - Assistant Head coach (United States) Emmett Rutkowski (2016–present)
  - Assistant Coach, Opposition Analysis (United States) Robert Stults (2016–present)
  - Assistant Coach, Goalkeeping (United States) Colt Reichl (2016–present)
  - Assistant Coach, Sports Science (United States) Ian Coyer (2016–present)
  - Assistant Coach, Sports Science (United States) Scott LeBlanc (2016–present)
  - Assistant Coach, Sports Science (United States) Todd Zachary (2016–present)

== Associated Clubs ==
=== Lady Rafters FC ===
In July 2016, the Rafters announced they would be fielding a Women's Premier Soccer League team, the Shreveport Lady Rafters FC, starting in 2017. The team will be coached by Northern Ireland native Ryan McConville.

=== Rafters Reserves ===
In September 2016, the Rafters announced a reserves team, the Shreveport Rafters FC B team, would play in the Gulf Coast Premier League.
