= SC Corinthians USA =

Corinthians USA
- Professional Team
- Full name: Sport Club Corinthians USA
- Founded: 2010; 15 years ago
- Dissolved: 2017
- Ground: Citrus College Stadium
- Head Coach: (Brazil) Pedro Henrique Lamounier
- League: (United States) NPSL
- 2017: 9th, Southwest Conference
- Website: https://www.corinthiansusa.com/
| Home colors | Away colors |

Sport Club Corinthians USA is a men's soccer club based in Glendora, California that last played in the NPSL West Region's Southwest Conference. The team have the same name of a famous Brazilian team Sport Club Corinthians Paulista.

== History ==
Founded in 2010 as a subsidiary of Brazilian club Sport Club Corinthians Paulista, the Sport Club Corinthians USA initially played in Coast Soccer League. The club ceased its partnership with the Brazilian club in 2013. In 2014, the team played the Lamar Hunt U.S. Open Cup. From 2016 the team competed in NPSL, until in the 2018 season their membership was terminated.
