= Troy Watson =

Hanwha Eagles
- Pitcher
- Born: June 11, 1997 (age 29); Gunter, Texas, U.S.
- Bats: Right Throws: Right

Teams
- Hanwha Eagles (2027–present)

Troy Watson (born June 11, 1997) is an American baseball pitcher for the Hanwha Eagles of the KBO League.

== Amateur career ==
Watson attended Gunter High School in Gunter, Texas, and the University of Northern Colorado, where he played college baseball for the Northern Colorado Bears.

== Professional career ==
The Toronto Blue Jays selected Watson in the 15th round of the 2018 MLB draft. The Blue Jays traded him to the Detroit Tigers in 2024 and Watson re-signed with the Tigers after the 2025 season. The Tigers added him to their 40-man roster on July 19, 2026. On August 12, Watson was designated for assignment by the Tigers.

On August 15, 2026, Watson was claimed off of waivers by the Seattle Mariners. He made 10 appearances (including one start) for the Triple–A Tacoma Rainiers, posting an 0–1 record and 4.20 ERA with 15 strikeouts and two saves over 15 innings of work. On November 2, Watson was removed from the 40–man roster and sent outright to Tacoma. He elected free agency on November 2.

On November 11, 2026, Watson signed with the Hanwha Eagles of the KBO League.
