= Joao Johanning =

Costa Rican footballer (born 1990)

Personal information
- Full name: Joao Fernando Johanning Mora
- Date of birth: 15 May 1990 (age 36)
- Place of birth: Bissau, Guinea-Bissau
- Positions: Midfielder; winger; forward

Youth career
- Saprissa

Senior career*
Years	Team	Apps	(Gls)
2010	Pérez Zeledón	2	(0)
- Atlanta Silverbacks
2019	Chattanooga FC		
- * Club domestic league appearances and goals

Joao Fernando Johanning Mora (born 15 May 1990) is a Bissau-Guinean former footballer who played as a midfielder, winger or forward.

== Career ==
At the age of 17, Johanning arrived in Costa Rica from Guinea-Bissau through his adoptive mother, missionary Isabel Johanning.

As a youth player, he joined the youth academy of Saprissa, Costa Rica's most successful club.

In 2019, he signed for American fourth division side Chattanooga FC after playing for Atlanta Silverbacks in the American fourth division.
