= Matt Clare =

American soccer player (born 1988)

Personal information
- Full name: Matthew Christopher Clare
- Date of birth: May 25, 1988 (age 38)
- Place of birth: Fort Lauderdale, Florida, United States
- Height: 6 ft 0 in (1.83 m)
- Position: Forward

Senior career*
Years	Team	Apps	(Gls)
2008	West Virginia Chaos	8	(12)
2009	Bradenton Academics	10	(17)
2011–2013	Tampa Bay Rowdies	27	(13)
2012	Norfolk SharX (indoor)	23	(20)
2012	Syracuse Silver Knights (indoor)	6	(17)
2012–2013	Wichita Wings (indoor)	5	(12)
2013–2015	Wichita B-52s (indoor)	32	(88)
2015	FC Wichita	15	(12)
2015–2018	San Diego Sockers (indoor)	71	(78)
2016	Albion SC Pros	14	(14)
2017	FC Wichita	9	(7)
2018	RWB Adria		
2018–2019	Tacoma Stars (indoor)	10	(5)
2019–2020	Florida Tropics (indoor)	24	(16)

International career
2014-2019	United States Arena Soccer	55	(23)
- * Club domestic league appearances and goals as of 22 January 2021

Matt Clare (born May 25, 1988, in Fort Lauderdale, Florida) is an American soccer player who last played for Florida Tropics SC in the Major Arena Soccer League.

== Career ==
=== Youth and amateur ===
Clare, who did not play college soccer, played with elite youth team Charlotte Soccer, before going on to play for IMG ACADEMY.

=== Professional ===
Clare signed his first professional contract in 2011 when he signed with FC Tampa Bay of the North American Soccer League, having trialed with the team during pre-season. He made his professional debut on May 11, coming on as a late substitute in a game against FC Edmonton. Tampa Bay announced that the club exercised its 2012 contract option on Clare on October 5, 2011. The new contract also includes a club option for the 2013 season. Clare went on to play for the Wichita Wings in the Major Indoor Soccer League and the Wichita B-52s in the MASL. Clare signed for the San Diego Sockers in 2015 where he won 3 conference championships. Clare signed for National Premier Soccer League club FC Wichita on Feb 23, 2015 leading them to 2 conference championships. Clare has been a dominant force in the indoor game over the course of 7 years. Clare represented the United States Arena team over 4 years winning the World Cup in 2015 . Clare traveled to Tunisia to try his luck again but came up short in the quarter finals to Mexico in a heartbreaking loss.

Clare made his return to Florida on 31 January 2019, signing with Florida Tropics SC. Clare has been a dominant force in the indoor game over the course of 7 years.

== Personal ==
Matt is the son of former professional soccer player John Clare, who played for the Fort Lauderdale Strikers in the American Professional Soccer League in the 1990s. Matt's brother Andrew currently plays as a centerback for Tropics SC in the United Premier Soccer League.
