= Legacy 76 =

American soccer team

Virginia Legacy
- Full name: Legacy
- Nickname: The Legacy
- Founded: 1976; 50 years ago
- Stadium: James City County Stadium Wanner Stadium; Williamsburg, Virginia
- Capacity: 3,000
- Owner: Virginia Legacy Soccer Club
- League: National Premier Soccer League
- 2009: 8th, Mid Atlantic (USL PDL); Playoffs: DNQ
- Website: http://www.valegacysoccer.com/NPSL/NPSLnews/index_E.html
Home colors	Away colors

Legacy is an American soccer team based in Williamsburg, Virginia, United States. The team plays in the Mid-Atlantic Conference of the National Premier Soccer League (NPSL), the fourth tier of the American soccer pyramid.

The team was founded in 1976 as Williamsburg Soccer Club. It played in the USL Premier Development League (PDL), considered roughly equal to the NPSL, until 2009, after which the franchise folded and the team left the league. In June 2013, it was announced that the club would re-join the fourth tier for the 2014 season in the NPSL.

The team plays its home games in James City County Stadium-Wanner Stadium. The team's colors are white, red and black.

== History ==
The Williamsburg Soccer Club was founded as an amateur sports association serving the local community in 1976. In 2001, the club joined the United Soccer Leagues (USL), creating a team franchised in the Premier Development League (PDL). The team was known as Williamsburg Legacy until January 2007, when Williamsburg Soccer Club merged with the nearby Colonial Football Club to form the Virginia Legacy Soccer Club. The PDL team then changed its name to Virginia Legacy to reflect the merger.

The Legacy had a successful series of early years in the PDL, earning first or second-place finishes in their division. Following the 2009 season in which the club finished eighth, the team folded but continued to remain active as a youth and community soccer organization.

On June 4, 2013, it was announced that the Legacy would re-join the fourth tier of American soccer, this time in the alternative National Premier Soccer League (NPSL), to begin play in the Mid-Atlantic Conference in 2014. In 2014, the team announced it was rebranding to Legacy 76 to reflect the year of its founding.

Virginia Legacy crest 2007–09

== Year-by-year ==
Year	Division	League	Regular season	Playoffs	Open Cup
2002	4	USL PDL	1st, Mid Atlantic	Conference Semifinals	Did not qualify
2003	4	USL PDL	2nd, Mid Atlantic	Conference Semifinals	Did not qualify
2004	4	USL PDL	2nd, Mid Atlantic	Conference Semifinals	Did not qualify
2005	4	USL PDL	6th, Mid Atlantic	Did not qualify	Did not qualify
2006	4	USL PDL	2nd, Mid Atlantic	Conference Semifinals	Did not qualify
2007	4	USL PDL	3rd, Mid Atlantic	Did not qualify	Did not qualify
2008	4	USL PDL	4th, Mid Atlantic	Did not qualify	Did not qualify
2009	4	USL PDL	8th, Mid Atlantic	Did not qualify	Did not qualify
On Hiatus from 2010 to 2013
2014	4	NPSL	4th, Mid-Atlantic	Did not qualify	Did not qualify
2015	4	NPSL	5th, Mid-Atlantic	Did not qualify	Did not qualify
2016	4	NPSL	2nd, Mid-Atlantic	Regional semifinals	Did not qualify

== Honors ==
- USL PDL Mid Atlantic Division Champions 2002

== Head coaches ==
- (United States) Jeff Dominguez (2005–2006)
- (United States) Kevin Darcy (2007)
- (United States) Tim Cristian (2008–2009)
- (United States) Kevin Darcy (2015)

== Stadiums ==
- Busch Field; Williamsburg, Virginia (2003–2005)
- Captains Field Christopher Newport University; Newport News, Virginia 2 games (2005)
- Albert-Daly Field; Williamsburg, Virginia (2006–2007)
- James City County Stadium; (Wanner Stadium) Williamsburg, Virginia (2008–present)
- Captains Field (Christopher Newport University), Newport News, Virginia (2014–2015)

== Average attendance ==
Attendance stats are calculated by averaging each team's self-reported home attendances from the historical match archive at https://web.archive.org/web/20100105175057/http://www.uslsoccer.com/history/index_E.html.

- 2001: 511
- 2002: 419
- 2003: 609
- 2004: 462
- 2005: 233
- 2006: 248
- 2007: 238
- 2008: 197
- 2009: 115
- 2015: 823
