= Myrtle Beach Mutiny =

- Full name: Myrtle Beach Mutiny
- Nickname: The Mutiny
- Founded: 2011; 15 years ago
- Dissolved: 2018; 8 years ago
- Stadium: North Myrtle Beach Park and Sports Complex
- Capacity: 1,000
- Owner: Coast FA
- 2018: 1st, South Atlantic Division; Playoffs: Conference Semifinals
- Website: www.mbmutiny.com
Home colors	Away colors

The Myrtle Beach Mutiny were an American soccer team based in Myrtle Beach, South Carolina, United States. The Myrtle Beach Mutiny was owned by Coast FA.

== Kit provider ==
During the 2018 season, the Mutiny's kit was provided by Capelli Sport, which served as the uniform sponsors.

== Seasons ==
Year	Division	League	Conference	Division	Finish	Record (W-L-T)	Playoffs	U.S. Open Cup
2012	4	NPSL	South	Southeast-East	3rd	4–4–0	Did not qualify	Did not qualify
2013	4	NPSL	South	Mid-Atlantic	2nd	4–3–1	Did not qualify	Did not qualify
2014	4	NPSL	South	South Atlantic	4th	3–5–2	Did not qualify	Did not qualify
2015	4	NPSL	South	South Atlantic	1st	11–2–1	South Region Finalist	Did not qualify
2016	4	NPSL	South	South Atlantic	1st	6–2–3	South Atlantic Semifinals	1st Round
2017	4	USL PDL	Eastern	South Atlantic	1st	10–1–3	Conference Semifinals	Did not qualify
2018	4	USL PDL	Eastern	South Atlantic	1st	9–2–3	Conference Semifinals	1st Round

== Honors ==
- Premier Development League
  - South Atlantic Division
    - Champions (2): 2017, 2018
- National Premier Soccer League
  - South Atlantic Division
    - Champions (2): 2015, 2016

== Staff ==
=== Latest staff ===
- (United States) Patrick Piscitelli – Sports Director
- (Wales) Ross Morgan – Technical Director
- (United States) Kyle Timm – Head Coach
- (Cyprus) Marcos Spanos - Assistant Coach
- (United States) Burt Marlow - Kit Manager
- (United States) Robert Downes - Marketing Director
- (United States) Manny Ardeljan - Game Day Operations
- (United States) Brian Smith - Sponsorship Director

== Stadium ==
The Mutiny played at North Myrtle Beach Park and Sports Complex North Myrtle Beach. Training sessions at Socastee Recreation Park in Socastee.

== Off the field ==
Despite their success on the field, the team folded in 2018.
