= Club Xolos USA U-23 =

American soccer team

- Professional Team
- Founded: 1966; 59 years ago
- Stadium: John W. North High School
- Owner: Robert Lopez-Guardado
- Head Coach: Shane Shelton
- League: NPSL
- 2019: 8th, West-Southwest; Playoffs: Did not qualify
- Website: https://riversidecorasfc.com/

Club Xolos USA U-23, formerly Deportivo Coras USA, is an American soccer team based in Riverside, California, and is affiliated with Mexican side Club Tijuana Xoloitzcuintles de Caliente. The club currently competes in the National Premier Soccer League in the Southwest Conference, having joined the league as an expansion team in 2014.

== History ==
Deportivo Coras began as an amateur, affiliated soccer club in 1966–67, shortly thereafter joining the Belvedere Soccer League in East Los Angeles, where they'd win two championships in the 1967 and 1968 seasons. The club joined the California League in 1969, where they'd play for over 30 seasons before joining So-Cal Premier League. Coras announced they would be joining NPSL on November 20, 2014, and played their inaugural season in NPSL in the 2015 season. The club has an affiliation with Mexican club Deportivo Tepic FC.

In November 2019, the club rebranded as Club Xolos USA U-23, establishing an affiliation with Mexican side Club Tijuana.

== Club honors ==
- Socal Premier U-23 Champions: 2014

== Rivalry ==
The team has one rival, Temecula FC, commonly known as the Riverside County Derby for the simple fact that both teams are in the same county. The Xolos have typically dominated the derby, beating Temecula for four straight seasons (2015–18). In 2019, the first match which was held in Temecula ended up 0-0, while the second match hosted by Riverside resulted in the Quails first win against Riverside in the NPSL, the score was 2–1.

In 2016, the two teams began an off-season tournament called the Riverside County Cup which runs through October to November. The tournament is an open invitation to local NPSL and UPSL teams within Riverside county and surrounding areas. The Coras won the Cup for the first time on November 10, 2019, when the team defeated two-time defending champion Temecula, 4–0.

== Notable players ==
List of players that have gone to play professionally

Player	Position	Club	Nation	Tier
Alonso Lara	Goalkeeper	1. FCA Darmstadt	(Germany)	7th
Jose Perez	Defender	1. FCA Darmstadt	(Germany)	7th
Omar Aguilar Cruz	Defender	Mérida AD	(Spain)	4th
Eric Gonzalez	Midfielder	Las Vegas Lights / Oakland Roots	(United States)	2nd/3rd
Yosimar Hernandez	Defender	Reno 1868	(United States)	2nd
Julio Rabadan	Midfielder	Real Sport Clube	(Brazil)	Regional D2

Top goal scorer by NPSL season

Year	Player	Number of goals
2019	Adrian Moreno	11

== Staff ==
=== Coaches ===
Name	Season	W-L-T
Gabriel Esqueda	2018	0-4-0
Robert Vidrio	2018	2-4-1
Shane Shelton	2019	1-4-2

=== Front office ===
- (United States) Robert Lopez-Guardado - Majority Owner
- (United States) Nora Lopez - Director of Business Operations
- (United States) Jose "Chepe" Esqueda - Team Manager
- (Mexico) Robert Vidrio - Sporting Director
- (United States) Steven Ramirez - Director of Media/Writer
