= SoCal SC =

- Professional Team
- Full name: Southern California Sports Club
- Short name: Professional Team
- Founded: December 2, 2015; 10 years ago
- Dissolved: 2017
- Ground: Pomona Fairplex
- President: Dave Elmore (Elmore Sports Group)
- Manager: Daniel Gamba
- Head coach: Daniel Musatti
- League: NPSL
- 2016: 4th, Southwest Conference
- Website: http://www.thesocalsports.club/
Home colors	Away colors

SoCal SC was a men's soccer club based in San Bernardino, CA that competed in the NPSL West Region's Southwest Conference. It ceased operations on 19 July 2017. The team was owned by Elmore Sports Group.

== Pro players ==
2017 NPSL Roster

Players
No.	Position	Name	Country	Age
Goalkeepers
1	Goalkeeper	Giovani Riello	Brazil	January 14, 1995 (age 31)
12	Goalkeeper	Augusto Lima	Brazil	August 30, 1994 (age 31)
26	Goalkeeper	Tyler Wilson	Germany	April 8, 1994 (age 31)
Defenders
2	Defender	Jonathan Moreno	United States	June 19, 1997 (age 28)
3	Defender	Christopher Olvera	United States	August 8, 1997 (age 28)
4	Defender	Taeyoung Kim	South Korea	March 4, 1994 (age 31)
6	Defender	Jorge Caballero	Honduras	December 15, 1991 (age 34)
13	Defender	Max Rico	United States	July 15, 1993 (age 32)
21	Defender	Alex Zaragoza	United States	October 6, 1995 (age 30)
25	Defender	Daniel Lopez	United States	April 7, 1996 (age 29)
27	Defender	Titus Nickson	Nigeria	October 10, 1998 (age 27)
Midfielders
5	Midfielder	Eric Gonzalez	United States	March 24, 1994 (age 31)
7	Midfielder	Jorge Moreno Delgado	Mexico	June 3, 1995 (age 30)
8	Midfielder	Glenn Verley	United States	November 27, 1991 (age 34)
10	Midfielder	Andy Contreras	United States	November 18, 1990 (age 35)
14	Midfielder	Andy Ortega	United States	March 25, 1990 (age 35)
15	Midfielder	Jesus A. Soria	United States	October 16, 1995 (age 30)
16	Midfielder	Bryan Orta	United States	August 9, 1992 (age 33)
18	Midfielder	Jacob Arrieta	United States	August 17, 1993 (age 32)
20	Midfielder	Breno Calegari	Brazil	May 18, 1993 (age 32)
22	Midfielder	Santiago Warren	United States	August 28, 1996 (age 29)
23	Midfielder	Francisco Magaña	United States	March 14, 1993 (age 32)
28	Midfielder	Mariano Vavich	Argentina	December 26, 1996 (age 29)
Forwards
11	Forward	Bryan Rodriguez	United States	August 20, 1998 (age 27)
17	Forward	Jonathan Mendiola	United States	January 23, 1996 (age 30)
9	Forward	Edmilson Santos	Brazil	April 19, 1997 (age 28)
19	Forward	Roonie Moreno	Colombia	October 16, 1992 (age 33)
24	Forward	Jesus Rojas	Mexico	April 20, 1996 (age 29)

== Kit manufacturers and jersey sponsors ==
Period	Kit Manufacturer	Front Jersey Sponsor	Back Jersey Sponsor
2015 - 2017	(Denmark) hummel		(Brazil) World Sports Solutions

== Coaching staff ==
Period	Head Coach	Assistant Coach	Assistant Coach	Fitness Coach	GK Coach
2016	(Mexico) Roberto Vidrio	(Mexico) Mario Mejia	(United Kingdom) Colin Spreag	(Peru) Guillermo Rodriguez	(Mexico) Samuel Bernabe
2017	(Brazil) Daniel Musatti	(Mexico) Samuel Bernabe	(Brazil) Sinuê Zardo	(Peru) Guillermo Rodriguez	(Cuba) Jose Manuel Miranda

== Year-by-year performance ==
Year	Division	League	Season Games	Record (W-L-T)	Points	Goals Favor (GF)	Goals Against (GA)	Final Standings	Playoffs	Lamar Hunt U.S. Open Cup
2016	4th Tier (US Soccer)	NPSL	12	5-5-2	17	23	20	4th, Southwest Conference	Regional 1st Round	Did not enter
2017	4th Tier (US Soccer)	NPSL	16	5-8-3	18	30	29	5th, Southwest Conference	Did not qualify	Did not qualify
