= Weston FC =

American soccer team

- Full name: Weston Football Club
- Founded: 1998; 28 years ago
- Stadium: Cypress Bay High School; Weston, Florida
- Head Coach: Luis Mendoza
- League: USL League Two
- 2025: 6th of South Florida Division
- Website: westonfc.org
Home colors	Away colors

Weston Football Club is an American soccer club headquartered in Weston, Florida, currently competing in the USL League Two. They are also one of the largest soccer clubs in the country for youth soccer.

== History ==
The club was founded in 1998 as a youth soccer club. They have approximately 1,100 players and 70 teams registered in their youth program, developing several players such as Inter Miami CF players Benjamin Cremaschi, Noah Allen, George Acosta, among others across the MLS. In 2020, they were selected as one of the clubs to join the new MLS Next academy program.

In 2015, Weston added a semi-professional team in the National Premier Soccer League. They moved their team to the Premier Development League in 2017.

== Controversy ==
In 2019, Weston FC faced a major scandal when a 14-year-old player alleged that he was sexually assaulted by teammates during a trip to Colombia. This sparked outrage, leading to lawsuits, investigations, and player suspensions. The controversy exposed hazing practices, lack of safeguarding measures, and power dynamics within youth sports. It resulted in increased scrutiny, policy changes within Weston FC, and calls for broader reform across youth sports organizations to prevent abuse and protect young athletes.

== Year-by-year ==
Year	Level	League	Reg. season	Playoffs	Open Cup
2015	4	NPSL	5th, Sunshine	did not qualify	did not enter
2016	4	NPSL	8th, Sunshine	did not qualify	did not enter
2017	4	PDL	8th, Southeast	did not qualify	did not qualify
2018	4	PDL	6th, Southeast	did not qualify	did not enter
2019	4	USL League Two	8th, Southeast	did not qualify	did not qualify
2020	4	USL League Two	Season cancelled due to COVID-19 pandemic		
2021	4	USL League Two	4th, Southeast	did not qualify	did not qualify
2022	4	USL League Two	6th, Southeast	did not qualify	did not qualify
2023	4	USL League Two	1st, Southeast	Conference Quarterfinals	did not qualify
2024	4	USL League Two	6th, South Florida	did not qualify	did not qualify
2025	4	USL League Two	6th, South Florida	did not qualify	did not qualify
2026	4	USL League Two	4th, South Florida	did not qualify	did not qualify
