= Kraze United =

Kraze United FC
- Full name: Kraze United Football Club
- Founded: 2014; 12 years ago
- Ground: Trinity Preparatory School
- Capacity: 2,000
- Owner(s): Ray Collado, Francois "Didier" Menard, Tim Geltz, Joe Avallone
- Head Coach: Joe Avallone
- League: National Premier Soccer League
- Website: http://krazeunited.com/

Kraze United FC are a National Premier Soccer League team based in Orlando, Florida. The Kraze play in the NPSL's Sunshine Conference with five other Florida-based teams. The team roster includes Bitielo Jean Jacques, current Haiti national team defender.

The name Kraze United FC is inspired by the former name of Orlando City U-23, the Central Florida Kraze.
