= Liverpool Warriors =

Liverpool Warriors are an American soccer club based in the Dallas/Fort Worth metroplex affiliated with Liverpool F.C. They previously fielded a team in the National Premier Soccer League (NPSL). They played their games at various high school stadiums including 2,000 capacity John Clark Field in Plano, Texas. They discontinued fielding a NPSL team in 2017, but continue as a youth development program.

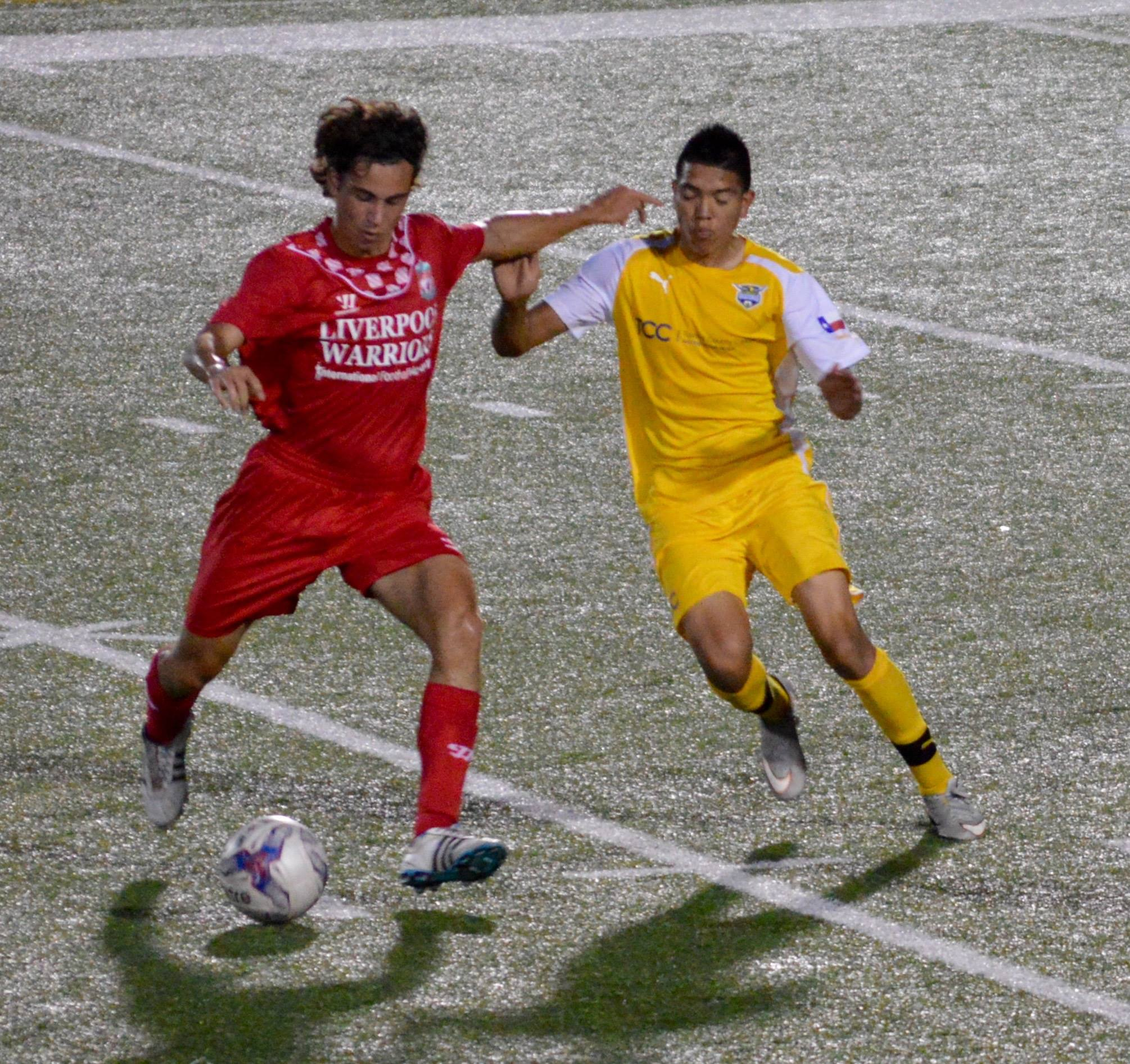
Photo taken from Liverpool Warriors vs Fort Worth Vaqueros during the 2015 NPSL season.

== Year-by-year ==
Year	Division	League	Regular season	Playoffs	Open Cup
2013	4	NPSL	2nd, South Central	Did not qualify	Did not qualify
2014	4	NPSL	4th, South Central	Did not qualify	Did not qualify
2015	4	NPSL	8th, South Central	Did not qualify	Did not qualify
2016	4	NPSL	5th, South Central	South Central semifinals	Did not qualify
