= 2015 U.S. Open Cup qualification =

American football competition

The 2015 Lamar Hunt U.S. Open Cup tournament proper featured teams from all five tiers of men's soccer of the American Soccer Pyramid.

All teams from the first three levels qualify. For the fourth and fifth tiers of the pyramid, a series of qualification and state tournaments are held to determine the berths into the tournament. These teams complete the 91-team field in the U.S. Open Cup.

== National Premier Soccer League (12) ==
On February 4, 2015, the NPSL announced 7 of the 12 NPSL sides for the US Open Cup listed below. Each of these teams was a playoff team from the previous season:

- Brooklyn Italians
- Chattanooga FC
- GBFC Thunder
- Lansing United
- Miami United F.C.
- Tulsa Athletics
- Upward Stars

On March 20, 2015, 3 additional teams were announced leaving 2 spots to be claimed.

- Detroit City FC
- Fort Pitt FC Regiment
- Virginia Beach City FC

On March 21, 2015, Sonoma County Sol qualified out of the Golden Gate Conference, leaving 1 team to qualify.

On March 22, 2015 FC Tacoma 253 became the final team to qualify.

=== West Region - Southwest Conference qualifying tournament ===
All four teams of the 2015 Southwest Conference competed in the qualifying tournament with FC Hasental and the San Diego Flash receiving first round byes.

Semifinals
San Diego Flash	4
Temecula FC	2
FC Hasental	0
Deportivo Coras USA	3

Final
San Diego Flash	2 (4)
Deportivo Coras USA	2 (1)

==== Matches ====
March 7, 2015 Semi-Final	San Diego Flash	4–2	Temecula FC	San Diego, California
TBD				Stadium: Mira Mesa High School

March 7, 2015 Semi-Final	FC Hasental	0–3	Deportivo Coras USA	Oak Park, California
TBD				Stadium: Oak Park High School

March 14, 2015 Final	San Diego Flash	2 (4)–2 (1)	Deportivo Coras USA	San Diego, California
6:30 pm PDT				Stadium: Mira Mesa High School

Winner advances to West Region - Conference Playoff

=== West Region - Northwest Conference qualifying tournament ===
Playoff
FC Tacoma 253	2
Spartans Futbol Club	1

February 20, 2015 Final	FC Tacoma 253	2–1	Spartans Futbol Club	Tukwila, Washington
	Jacobson 27'; Vaughn 32'			Stadium: Starfire Sports Complex

Winner advances to West Region - Conference Playoff

=== West Region - Conference Playoff ===
Playoff
FC Tacoma 253	6
San Diego Flash	1

March 22nd Final	FC Tacoma 253	6–1	San Diego Flash	Seattle, Washington
2pm PDT	Milan 9', 72' (pen.); Shaxton 16', 86'; Vaughn 47'; Goudley 81'		Valle-Ortiz 52' (pen.)	Stadium: Memorial Stadium; Referee: Raul Sheran

FC Tacoma 253 advances to Open Cup

=== West Region - Golden Gate Conference qualifying tournament ===
All five teams of the 2015 Golden Gate Conference will compete in the qualifying tournament with Sacramento Gold and Real San Jose starting off with a play-in game.

First Round
Sacramento Gold	0
Real San Jose	3

Semi-Final
Sonoma County Sol	4
Real San Jose	3
CD Aguiluchos USA	8
SF Stompers FC	1

Final
Sonoma County Sol	2
CD Aguiluchos USA	1

==== Matches ====
March 7, 2015 1st Round	Sacramento Gold	0–3	Real San Jose	Sacramento, California
				Stadium: Christian Brothers High School

March 14, 2015 Semi-Final	Real San Jose	3–4	Sonoma County Sol	San Jose, California
5pm PDT				Stadium: Mount Pleasant High School

March 14, 2015 Semi-Final	CD Aguiluchos USA	8–1	SF Stompers FC	Oakland, California
				Stadium: Raimondi Park

March 21, 2015 Final	Sonoma County Sol	2–1	CD Aguiluchos USA	Rohnert Park, California
				Stadium: Rancho Cotate High School

Sonoma County Sol advances to Open Cup

== USASA (11) ==
The USASA was allocated 11 qualifying spots in this years tournament.

The USASA adopted new qualification standards for the 2014 tournament citing earlier qualifying deadlines by USSF. They will now use the results from the previous calendar years tournaments to determine regional qualifiers. Region I has already adopted that their qualifiers will be the regional champion of both the USASA National Cup and the USASA US Amateur Cup. Other regions have yet to announce who they will qualify.

Region	Qualification method	Qualified team
I	Amateur Cup Regional Champion	(New York (state)) NY Greek-American Atlas
I	Open Cup Regional Champion	Maryland Bays
II	TBD	(Kansas) KC Athletics
II	TBD	(Wisconsin) Madison Fire
III	Open Cup Regional Champion	(North Carolina) Triangle Brigade
III	Open Cup Regional Runner-up	(Texas) NTX Rayados
IV	Open Cup Regional Champion	(California) Chula Vista FC
IV	Open Cup Regional Runner-Up	(California) Cal FC
WC	TBD	(Massachusetts) Mass Premier Soccer
WC	TBD	(California) PSA Elite
WC	TBD	(Illinois) RWB Adria

== US Club Soccer (1) ==
San Francisco City FC

== USSSA (1) ==
Tournament took place between March 13 and March 15 at the Overland Park Soccer Complex in Overland Park, Kansas. 6 teams participated for one spot in the US Open Cup. The following teams competed. Colorado Rovers S.C.(Golden, CO), KC Athletics (Prairie View, KS), Monaco F.C. (Denver, CO), Colorado Sporting Premier (Auorora, CO), ASC Newstars (Houston, TX), Harpo's F.C.(Boulder, CO)

The KC Athletics and Harpo's FC advanced to the final with KC winning 3–1. However, Harpo's FC advanced as well as KC to the US Open Cup due to KC Athletics having already qualified through USASA Region 2. They would again meet in the preliminary round of the Open Cup, with Harpo's FC advancing with a 2–1 victory.
