= 2015 U.S. Open Cup =

102nd edition of cup competition in American soccer

2015 Lamar Hunt U.S. Open Cup
Tournament details
- Country: United States
- Teams: 91

Final positions
- Champions: Sporting Kansas City (3rd title)
- Runners-up: Philadelphia Union
- 2016–17 CONCACAF Champions League: Sporting Kansas City

Tournament statistics
- Matches played: 90
- Goals scored: 274 (3.04 per match)
- Top goal scorer(s): Dom Dwyer; Krisztián Németh (5 goals each)

The 2015 Lamar Hunt U.S. Open Cup was the 102nd edition of the oldest ongoing competition in American soccer.

The tournament had teams from all three tiers of men's professional soccer, plus teams from the top amateur leagues in the United States. Qualification began in 2014 with USASA regional winners qualifying for 2015. The tournament retained a format that had only two changes from 2014. For the first time, the competition used a fixed bracket system starting with the Round of 16. Teams were grouped geographically into groups of four teams, with each group being paired with another to determine the semifinal pairings. Secondly, a rule was formalized preventing teams from the same ownership group from meeting until the final.

The cash prize amounts were the same as last year, with the champion receiving $250,000 and the runner-up $60,000. Also, the team from each lower division that advanced the furthest received $15,000. The teams that received $15,000 were: (a) PSA Elite an amateur team that advanced to the 4th round where they lost to the LA Galaxy; (b) the Charlotte Independence of the USL advanced to the 5th round where they lost to the Chicago Fire; and (c) New York Cosmos of the NASL which also advanced to the 5th round before losing to the New York Red Bulls.

== Qualification ==
All United States Division I (MLS), Division II (NASL), & Division III (USL) teams qualify automatically.

Enter in Preliminary round	Enter in first round	Enter in second round	Enter in third round	Enter in fourth round
USCS/USASA/USSSA; 1 team/2 teams/1 team	NPSL/PDL/USASA; 12 teams/19 teams/9 teams	USL; 21 teams	NASL; 9 teams	MLS; 17 teams
US Club Soccer: San Francisco City FC; USASA: Cal FC; KC Athletics; USSSA: Harpo's FC	NPSL: Brooklyn Italians; Chattanooga FC; Detroit City FC; FC Tacoma 253; Fort Pitt FC Regiment; GBFC Thunder; Lansing United; Miami United F.C.; Sonoma County Sol; Tulsa Athletics; Upward Stars; Virginia Beach City FC; PDL: AC Connecticut; Burlingame Dragons FC; BYU Cougars; Des Moines Menace; FC Tucson; Golden State Misioneros FC; Jersey Express S.C.; Kitsap Pumas; Laredo Heat; Long Island Rough Riders; Michigan Bucks; Midland/Odessa Sockers; Ocala Stampede; Reading United AC; Seacoast United Phantoms; SW Florida Adrenaline; Ventura County Fusion; West Virginia Chaos; Western Mass Pioneers; USASA: Chula Vista FC; GPS Massachusetts; Greek American AA; Madison Fire; Maryland Bays; NTX Rayados; PSA Elite ^{$}; RWB Adria; Triangle Brigade	Arizona United SC; Austin Aztex; Charleston Battery; Charlotte Independence ^{$}; Colorado Springs Switchbacks; Harrisburg City Islanders; LA Galaxy II; Louisville City FC; New York Red Bulls II; Oklahoma City Energy FC; Orange County Blues FC; Pittsburgh Riverhounds; Portland Timbers 2; Real Monarchs; Richmond Kickers; Rochester Rhinos; Sacramento Republic FC; Saint Louis FC; Seattle Sounders FC 2; Tulsa Roughnecks; Wilmington Hammerheads FC	Atlanta Silverbacks; Carolina RailHawks; Fort Lauderdale Strikers; Indy Eleven; Jacksonville Armada FC; Minnesota United FC; New York Cosmos ^{$}; San Antonio Scorpions FC; Tampa Bay Rowdies	Chicago Fire; Colorado Rapids; Columbus Crew; FC Dallas; D.C. United; Houston Dynamo; LA Galaxy; New England Revolution; New York City FC; New York Red Bulls; Orlando City SC; Philadelphia Union ^{$$}; Portland Timbers; Real Salt Lake; San Jose Earthquakes; Seattle Sounders FC; Sporting Kansas City ^{$$$}

- $: Winner of $15,000 bonus for advancing the furthest in the competition from their respective divisions.
- $$: Winner of $60,000 for being the runner-up in the competition.
- $$$: Winner of $250,000 for winning the competition.

== Brackets ==
Preliminary round April 25
**USSSA**	**Harpo's FC**	**2**
USASA	KC Athletics	0
USCS	San Francisco City FC	1
**USASA**	**Cal FC**	**2**

First round May 13
**NPSL**	**Chattanooga FC**	**1(4)**
PDL	Ocala Stampede	1(2)
**NPSL**	**Upward Stars**	**3(3)**
USASA	Triangle Brigade	3(1)
**NPSL**	**Miami United F.C.**	**2**
PDL	SW Florida Adrenaline	1
**NPSL**	**Lansing United**	**0(4)**
USASA	RWB Adria	0(2)
**PDL**	**Jersey Express S.C.**	**3**
USASA	Greek American AA	0
**PDL**	**Reading United AC**	**1**
USASA	Maryland Bays	0
PDL	Western Mass Pioneers	1(3)
**NPSL**	**GBFC Thunder**	**1(4)**
**PDL**	**Long Island Rough Riders**	**3**
NPSL	Brooklyn Italians	1
PDL	BYU Cougars	0(2)
**USSSA**	**Harpo's FC**	**0(4)**
NPSL	FC Tacoma 253	2
**PDL**	**Kitsap Pumas**	**5**
**PDL**	**Michigan Bucks**	**3**
NPSL	Detroit City FC	0
PDL	AC Connecticut	2
**NPSL**	**Virginia Beach City FC**	**3**
**PDL**	**West Virginia Chaos**	**1**
NPSL	Fort Pitt FC Regiment	0
**PDL**	**Des Moines Menace**	**2**
USASA	Madison Fire	1
**PDL**	**Laredo Heat**	**0(4)**
USASA	NTX Rayados	0(2)
USASA	GPS Massachusetts	1
**PDL**	**Seacoast United Phantoms**	**2**
**PDL**	**Midland/Odessa Sockers**	**3**
NPSL	Tulsa Athletics	1
**NPSL**	**Sonoma County Sol**	**2***
PDL	Burlingame Dragons FC	1
PDL	FC Tucson	1
**USASA**	**Chula Vista FC**	**2***
**PDL**	**Ventura County Fusion**	**3(6)**
USASA	Cal FC	3(5)
**USASA**	**PSA Elite**	**7**
PDL	Golden State Misioneros	1

Second round May 19–20
USL	Wilmington Hammerheads FC	1(3)
**NPSL**	**Chattanooga FC**	**1(5)**
**USL**	**Charlotte Independence**	**4**
NPSL	Upward Stars	1
**USL**	**Charleston Battery**	**1**
NPSL	Miami United F.C.	0
NPSL	Lansing United	0
**USL**	**Louisville City FC**	**1**
**PDL**	**Jersey Express S.C.**	**1**
USL	New York Red Bulls II	0
PDL	Reading United AC	0
**USL**	**Harrisburg City Islanders**	**3**
**USL**	**Rochester Rhinos**	**1**
NPSL	GBFC Thunder	0
PDL	Long Island Rough Riders	0
**USL**	**Real Monarchs**	**1**
**USL**	**Colorado Springs Switchbacks**	**2**
USSSA	Harpo's FC	1
**USL**	**Seattle Sounders FC 2**	**4***
PDL	Kitsap Pumas	2
PDL	Michigan Bucks	0
**USL**	**Portland Timbers 2**	**2**
**USL**	**Richmond Kickers**	**2**
NPSL	Virginia Beach City FC	0
**USL**	**Pittsburgh Riverhounds**	**3**
PDL	West Virginia Chaos	0
**USL**	**Saint Louis FC**	**2***
PDL	Des Moines Menace	1
**USL**	**Austin Aztex**	**2**
PDL	Laredo Heat	0
**USL**	**Tulsa Roughnecks**	**1**
PDL	Seacoast United Phantoms	0
PDL	Midland/Odessa Sockers	1
**USL**	**Oklahoma City Energy FC**	**3**
**USL**	**Sacramento Republic FC**	**4**
NPSL	Sonoma County Sol	2
USL	Arizona United SC	0
**USASA**	**Chula Vista FC**	**3**
USL	LA Galaxy II	1
**PDL**	**Ventura County Fusion**	**2**
USL	Orange County Blues FC	1
**USASA**	**PSA Elite**	**2**

Third round May 27
NPSL	Chattanooga FC	1
**NASL**	**Atlanta Silverbacks**	**2***
NASL	Carolina RailHawks	0
**USL**	**Charlotte Independence**	**1**
**USL**	**Charleston Battery**	**3**
NASL	Fort Lauderdale Strikers	2
NASL	Indy Eleven	0
**USL**	**Louisville City FC**	**2***
**NASL**	**New York Cosmos**	**3**
PDL	Jersey Express S.C.	0
USL	Harrisburg City Islanders	1
**USL**	**Rochester Rhinos**	**3***
USL	Real Monarchs	0
**USL**	**Colorado Springs Switchbacks**	**1**
**USL**	**Seattle Sounders FC 2**	**2***
USL	Portland Timbers 2	1
**USL**	**Richmond Kickers**	**3**
NASL	Jacksonville Armada FC	0
**USL**	**Pittsburgh Riverhounds**	**1**
NASL	Tampa Bay Rowdies	0
**USL**	**Saint Louis FC**	**1(3)**
NASL	Minnesota United FC	1(1)
NASL	San Antonio Scorpions	0
**USL**	**Austin Aztex**	**2**
USL	Tulsa Roughnecks	0
**USL**	**Oklahoma City Energy FC**	**1**
**USL**	**Sacramento Republic FC**	**7**
USASA	Chula Vista FC	3
PDL	Ventura County Fusion	1
**USASA**	**PSA Elite**	**2**

Host team listed first
Bold = winner
* = after extra time, ( ) = penalty shootout score

Fourth round June 16–17
**MLS**	**New York Red Bulls**	**3**
NASL	Atlanta Silverbacks	0
**NASL**	**New York Cosmos**	**2(4)**
MLS	New York City FC	2(3)
**MLS**	**Philadelphia Union**	**0(3)**
USL	Rochester Rhinos	0(1)
USL	Pittsburgh Riverhounds	1
**MLS**	**D.C. United**	**3***
**MLS**	**Chicago Fire**	**1***
USL	Louisville City FC	0
MLS	New England Revolution	0
**USL**	**Charlotte Independence**	**1**
USL	Charleston Battery	4(7)
**MLS**	**Orlando City SC**	**4(8)**
USL	Richmond Kickers	1
**MLS**	**Columbus Crew**	**3**
**MLS**	**Sporting Kansas City**	**1**
USL	Saint Louis FC	0
**MLS**	**FC Dallas**	**4**
USL	Oklahoma City Energy FC	1
**MLS**	**Houston Dynamo**	**2**
USL	Austin Aztex	0
**MLS**	**Colorado Rapids**	**4**
USL	Colorado Springs Switchbacks	1
**MLS**	**Real Salt Lake**	**2**
USL	Seattle Sounders FC 2	1
MLS	Seattle Sounders FC	1
**MLS**	**Portland Timbers**	**3***
**MLS**	**San Jose Earthquakes**	**2(6)**
USL	Sacramento Republic FC	2(5)
**MLS**	**LA Galaxy**	**6**
USASA	PSA Elite	1

Round of 16; June 30–July 1
**MLS**	**New York Red Bulls**	**4**
NASL	New York Cosmos	1
**MLS**	**Philadelphia Union**	**2**
MLS	D.C. United	1
**MLS**	**Chicago Fire**	**3**
USL	Charlotte Independence	1
**MLS**	**Orlando City SC**	**2**
MLS	Columbus Crew	0
**MLS**	**Sporting Kansas City**	**6**
MLS	FC Dallas	2
**MLS**	**Houston Dynamo**	**1**
MLS	Colorado Rapids	0
**MLS**	**Real Salt Lake**	**2**
MLS	Portland Timbers	0
MLS	San Jose Earthquakes	0
**MLS**	**LA Galaxy**	**1**

Quarterfinals; July 14–22
MLS	New York Red Bulls	1(3)
**MLS**	**Philadelphia Union**	**1(4)**
**MLS**	**Chicago Fire**	**3**
MLS	Orlando City SC	1
**MLS**	**Sporting Kansas City**	**3**
MLS	Houston Dynamo	1
**MLS**	**Real Salt Lake**	**1**
MLS	LA Galaxy	0

Semifinals; August 12
**MLS**	**Philadelphia Union**	**1**
MLS	Chicago Fire	0
**MLS**	**Sporting Kansas City**	**3**
MLS	Real Salt Lake	1

Final; September 30
MLS	Philadelphia Union	1(6)
**MLS**	**Sporting Kansas City**	**1(7)**

- Host team listed first
- **Bold** = winner
- * = after extra time, ( ) = penalty shootout score

== Entries ==
Round	Total clubs remaining	Clubs involved this round	Winners from previous round	New entries this round	Leagues entering at this round
Preliminary round	91	4	none	4	USCS, USSSA, 2 of USASA
First round	89	42	2	40	NPSL, PDL, 9 of USASA
Second round	68	42	21	21	USL
Third round	47	30	21	9	NASL
Fourth round	32	32	15	17	MLS
Fifth round	16	16	16	none	none
Quarterfinals	8	8	8	none	none
Semifinals	4	4	4	none	none
Final	2	2	2	none	none

== Match details ==
=== Preliminary round ===
The Preliminary round draw was announced Wednesday, April 8, 2015. A total of 4 clubs competed, all amateur clubs from the fourth tier of American soccer.

April 25	San Francisco City FC (5-USCS)	1–2	Cal FC (5-USASA)	San Francisco, California
14:00 PT	Mendoza 76' (o.g.)	Report	Cummings 48' (pen.); Bravo 87' (pen.)	Stadium: Kezar Stadium; Attendance: 1,419; Referee: Michael Samaan

April 25	Harpo's FC (5-USSSA)	2–0	KC Athletics (5-USASA)	Commerce City, Colorado
16:00 MT	Campbell 60'; Wheeler 70'	Report		Stadium: Dick's Sporting Goods Park, Field 19; Referee: Karen Abt

=== First round ===
The first round draw was announced Wednesday, April 8, 2015. A total of 42 clubs competed, including the 2 winners from the preliminary round and 40 new entries from the 4th and 5th tiers.

May 13	West Virginia Chaos (4-PDL)	1–0	Fort Pitt FC Regiment (4-NPSL)	Charleston, West Virginia
19:00 ET	Smee 5', (yellow card) 34'	Report	Tuohy (yellow card) 21'; Fonagy (yellow card) 33'	Stadium: Schoenbaum Stadium; Attendance: 150; Referee: Maggie Short

May 13	Western Mass Pioneers (4-PDL)	1–1 (a.e.t.) (3–4 p)	GBFC Thunder (4-NPSL)	Ludlow, Massachusetts
19:00 ET	Taylor 23'; Tomas (yellow card) NA' (yellow-red card) 57'	Western Mass Report; GBFC Report	Cross 54'	Stadium: Lusitano Stadium; Attendance: 300; Referee: Matthew Mercier

May 13	Lansing United (4-NPSL)	0–0 (a.e.t.) (4–2 p)	RWB Adria (5-USASA)	East Lansing, Michigan
19:00 ET		Report		Stadium: East Lansing Soccer Complex; Attendance: 487; Referee: Donovan Noocha

May 13	Miami United F.C. (4-NPSL)	2–1	SW Florida Adrenaline (4-PDL)	Hialeah, Florida
19:00 ET	Hurtado 67'; Abirached 83'	Report	Chedravi 78'	Stadium: Milander Park; Attendance: 120; Referee: Marcos De Oliveira

May 13	Upward Stars (4-NPSL)	3–3 (a.e.t.) (3–1 p)	Triangle Brigade (5-USASA)	Spartanburg, South Carolina
19:00 ET	Carl 8'; Keen 53'; Schmiege 54'	Report	Chivu 11'; Silva 30'; Toma 62'	Stadium: Star Center; Attendance: 236; Referee: David Erbacher

May 13	AC Connecticut (4-PDL)	2–3	Virginia Beach City FC (4-NPSL)	Danbury, Connecticut
19:00 ET	Carvalho 34'; Zurita 62'	Report	Hill 7'; Cyrus 71' (pen.); Thomas 88'	Stadium: Westside Athletic Complex; Referee: Mark Allatin

May 13	Reading United AC (4-PDL)	1–0	Maryland Bays (4-USASA)	Reading, Pennsylvania
19:00 ET	Campbell 19'	Report		Stadium: Don Thomas Stadium; Attendance: 231; Referee: Jaroslaw Werel

May 13	Michigan Bucks (4-PDL)	3–0	Detroit City FC (4-NPSL)	Pontiac, Michigan
19:30 ET	Wysong 5'; Marošević 7'; Ruhaak 30'	Michigan Report; Detroit Report		Stadium: Ultimate Soccer Arenas; Attendance: 1,845; Referee: Brandon Artis

May 13	Chattanooga FC (4-NPSL)	1–1 (a.e.t.) (4–2 p)	Ocala Stampede (4-PDL)	Chattanooga, Tennessee
19:30 ET	Winter 87'	Report	Wilson 61'	Stadium: Finley Stadium; Attendance: 2,483; Referee: Leland Grant
	Penalties
	(penalty scored) Winter; (penalty scored) Espinal; (penalty missed) Goni; (penalty scored) Finlay; (penalty scored) Hartley		(penalty scored) Walmsley; (penalty missed) Hilton; (penalty scored) Ribas; (penalty missed) Perez

May 13	Long Island Rough Riders (4-PDL)	3–1	Brooklyn Italians (4-NPSL)	South Huntington, New York
20:00 ET	Holland 1', 75'; Wignall 66'	Report	Williams (yellow card) 24'; Guerrier 38' (pen.)	Stadium: St. Anthony's High School; Attendance: ~100; Referee: Jaime Herrera

May 13	Jersey Express S.C. (4-PDL)	3–0	Greek American AA (4-USASA)	Newark, New Jersey
20:00 ET	Drljic 67'; Karcz 87'; Kavara 89'	Report		Stadium: J. Malcolm Simon Stadium; Attendance: 125; Referee: Mathew Richardson

May 13	GPS Massachusetts (5-USASA)	1–2	Seacoast United Phantoms (4-PDL)	Cambridge, Massachusetts
20:00 ET	Sanderman 17'	Report	Carter (yellow card) NA' (red card) 68'; Grant 70' (pen.); Tergou 88'	Stadium: Buckingham, Browne & Nichols School; Attendance: 85; Referee: Randall Kelley

May 13	Des Moines Menace (4-PDL)	2–1	Madison Fire (5-USASA)	West Des Moines, Iowa
19:30 CT	Cicciarelli 35'; Howell 62'	Report	Banks 78' (pen.)	Stadium: Valley Stadium; Attendance: 1641; Referee: Jeremy Kieso

May 13	Midland/Odessa Sockers (4-PDL)	3–1	Tulsa Athletics (4-NPSL)	Midland, Texas
19:30 CT	Hume 16'; Lopez 35'; Smith 86'	Report	Schmoker 76'	Stadium: Grande Communications Stadium; Attendance: 660; Referee: Marco Vega

May 13	Laredo Heat (4-PDL)	0–0 (a.e.t.) (4–2 p)	NTX Rayados (5-USASA)	Laredo, Texas
20:15 CT		Report		Stadium: Texas A&M International University Soccer Complex; Referee: Baltazar Peral Hana

May 13	BYU Cougars (4-PDL)	0–0 (a.e.t.) (2–4 p)	Harpo's FC (5-USSSA)	Provo, Utah
19:30 MT		Report		Stadium: BYU South Stadium; Attendance: 700; Referee: Adam Finney

May 13	FC Tucson (4-PDL)	1–2 (a.e.t.)	Chula Vista FC (5-USASA)	Tucson, Arizona
19:30 MT	Zambrano 58'	Report	Lopez 82'; Pinal 95'	Stadium: Kino North Stadium; Attendance: 503; Referee: Denis Vargas

May 13	FC Tacoma 253 (4-NPSL)	2–5	Kitsap Pumas (4-PDL)	Tacoma, Washington
18:30 PT	Wright 76'; Millan 88'	Report	Masumiya 4', 39'; Patino 34', 54'; Bond 48'	Stadium: Mount Tahoma Stadium; Attendance: 305; Referee: Josh Wilkens

May 13	Sonoma County Sol (4-NPSL)	2–1 (a.e.t.)	Burlingame Dragons FC (4-PDL)	Santa Rosa, California
19:00 PT	Salazar 90+'; Acevedo 97'	Report	Verde 77'	Stadium: Santa Rosa High School; Attendance: 720; Referee: Joseph Dickerson

May 13	Ventura County Fusion (4-PDL)	3–3 (a.e.t.) (6–5 p)	Cal FC (5-USASA)	Ventura, California
19:00 PT	Martinez 14'; Castro 39'; Zamora 63'	Report	Barrera 30'; Cummings 50'; Espinoza 89'	Stadium: Ventura County Sportsplex; Attendance: 225; Referee: Bernhard Hosu

May 13	PSA Elite (5-USASA)	7–1	Golden State Misioneros (4-PDL)	Los Angeles, California
19:00 PT	Bjurman 3'; Ochoa 26', 37'; Simmons 42'; Hoxie 65'; Salazar 69'; O'Brien 75'	Report	Gulure 35'	Stadium: Weingart Stadium; Attendance: 100; Referee: Alejandro Mariscal

=== Second round ===
The second round draw was announced on Wednesday, April 8, 2015. A total of 42 teams competed, including the 21 winners from the previous round and 21 new entries from the third tier United Soccer League. The lowest ranked teams this round are Harpo's FC, PSA Elite and Chula Vista FC from the fifth tier.

May 19	Michigan Bucks (4-PDL)	0–2	Portland Timbers 2 (3-USL)	Pontiac, Michigan
19:30 ET	Charalambous (yellow card) 75'	Report; Report	Fatawu (yellow card) 27', (goal) 90+3'; Belmar 56'; Gavin (yellow card) 67'	Stadium: Ultimate Soccer Arenas; Attendance: 467; Referee: Donovan Noocha

May 20	Pittsburgh Riverhounds (3-USL)	3–0	West Virginia Chaos (4-PDL)	Pittsburgh, Pennsylvania
19:00 ET	Vincent 9'; Moloto 10'; Earls (yellow card) 64'; Kerr 87'	Report	Lavender (yellow card) 44'	Stadium: Highmark Stadium; Attendance: 1500; Referee: Brandon Artis

May 20	Wilmington Hammerheads FC (3-USL)	1–1 (a.e.t.) (3–5 p)	Chattanooga FC (4-NPSL)	Wilmington, North Carolina
19:00 ET	Zimmerman 35' (pen.)	Report	Ochieng 57'	Stadium: Legion Stadium; Attendance: 600; Referee: Christopher Spivey
	Penalties
	Tomaselli (penalty scored); Defregger (penalty missed); Arnoux (penalty scored); Zimmerman (penalty scored)		(penalty scored) Zecca; (penalty scored) Winter; (penalty scored) Kauker; (penalty scored) De Smedt; (penalty scored) Finlay

May 20	Richmond Kickers (3-USL)	2–0	Virginia Beach City FC (4-NPSL)	Richmond, Virginia
19:00 ET	Shiffman 47'; Taylor (yellow card) 78'; Yeisley 89'	Report	T. Cyrus (yellow card) 27'; J. Cyrus (yellow card) 45'	Stadium: City Stadium; Attendance: 1,104; Referee: Randall Kelley

May 20	Lansing United (4-NPSL)	0–1	Louisville City FC (3-USL)	East Lansing, Michigan
19:00 ET	DeCosemo (yellow card) 76'	Report	Quinn (yellow card) 32'; Adams 48'; Reynolds (yellow card) 79'	Stadium: East Lansing Soccer Complex; Attendance: 647; Referee: John Douglas

May 20	Reading United AC (4-PDL)	0–3	Harrisburg City Islanders (3-USL)	Reading, Pennsylvania
19:00 ET	Nygaard (yellow card) 24'; Smith (yellow card) 31'	Report	DiPrima 8'; Benbow 10'; Tribbett 46'; Shaffer (yellow card) 70' (yellow-red card) 76'	Stadium: Don Thomas Stadium; Attendance: 100; Referee: Darth Newman

May 20	Rochester Rhinos (3-USL)	1–0	GBFC Thunder (4-NPSL)	Rochester, New York
19:05 ET	Forbes 39'	Report		Stadium: Sahlen's Stadium; Attendance: 2,975; Referee: David Mon

May 20	Charleston Battery (3-USL)	1–0	Miami United F.C. (4-NPSL)	Charleston, South Carolina
19:30 ET	Cordovés 40', (red card) 82'; Rodriguez (yellow card) 58'; Boyd (yellow card) 69'; Mueller (yellow card) 73'	Report	Ruiz (yellow card) 30'; Hurtado (yellow card) 56'; Echeveste (yellow card) 64'; Venezia (yellow card) 69'; Guimaraens (yellow card) 82'	Stadium: Blackbaud Stadium; Attendance: 1,954; Referee: Howard Ash

May 20	Charlotte Independence (3-USL)	4–1	Upward Stars (4-NPSL)	Rock Hill, South Carolina
19:30 ET	Zahorski 19', 44', 90+'; Martínez 40'; Cox (yellow card) 59'	Report	Carle 11'; Agiovlassitis (yellow card) 43'	Stadium: Eagle Field; Attendance: 786; Referee: Jeff Muschik

May 20	Long Island Rough Riders (4-PDL)	0–1	Real Monarchs SLC (3-USL)	South Huntington, New York
19:30 ET		Report	Velazco 77'	Stadium: St. Anthony's High School; Attendance: 200; Referee: Mark Allatin

May 20	Jersey Express S.C. (4-PDL)	1–0	New York Red Bulls II (3-USL)	Newark, New Jersey
20:00 ET	Karcz 59'; De Oliveiro (yellow card) 83'	Report	Thomas (yellow card) 37'	Stadium: J. Malcolm Simon Stadium; Attendance: 350; Referee: Jaroslaw Werel

May 20	Saint Louis FC (3-USL)	2–1 (a.e.t.)	Des Moines Menace (4-PDL)	Fenton, Missouri
19:00 CT	Gaul 68'; Musa (yellow card) 78'; Doody (yellow card) 90+2'; Lynch 97'; Dixon (yellow card) 116'	Report	Johnson (yellow card) 11'; Ben (yellow card) 32'; Polster (yellow card) 35'; Nortey (yellow card) 40'; Lujano (yellow card) 70' (yellow-red card) 108'; Bales (red card) 80'; Hellman 85' (pen.)	Stadium: St. Louis Soccer Park; Attendance: 3,060; Referee: Luis Guardia

May 20	Tulsa Roughnecks (3-USL)	1–0	Seacoast United Phantoms (4-PDL)	Tulsa, Oklahoma
19:05 CT	Brewster (yellow card) 17'; Bond 58'	Report	Simmond (yellow card) 20'	Stadium: Hurricane Soccer & Track Stadium; Referee: William Tomlinson

May 20	Midland/Odessa Sockers (4-PDL)	1–3	Oklahoma City Energy FC (3-USL)	Midland, Texas
19:30 CT	Sanchez 68'	Report	Greig 42', 70'; Townsend 51'; Hedrick (yellow card) 55'	Stadium: Grande Communications Stadium; Attendance: 545; Referee: Leszek Stalmach

May 20	Austin Aztex (3-USL)	2–0	Laredo Heat (4-PDL)	Austin, Texas
20:00 CT	Cuero 28'; King (yellow card) 51'; Fekete 73'	Report	Butler (yellow card) 44'; Moreno (yellow card) 67'	Stadium: House Park; Referee: Kyle Phillips

May 20	Colorado Springs Switchbacks FC (3-USL)	2–1	Harpo's FC (5-USSSA)	Colorado Springs, Colorado
19:00 MT	Maybin 1', 35'; Argueta (yellow card) 66' (yellow-red card) 76'	Report	Haber 49'; Cullen (yellow card) 70'	Stadium: Sand Creek Stadium; Referee: Hamed Sadeghi

May 20	PSA Elite (5-USASA)	2–1	Orange County Blues (3-USL)	Los Angeles, California
19:00 PT	Salazar 19'; Bjurman 61'; Wallace (red card) 82'	Report	Kim (yellow card) 53'; Feeley 90'	Stadium: Weingart Stadium; Attendance: 318; Referee: Reed Christy

May 20	Arizona United SC (3-USL)	0–3	Chula Vista FC (5-USASA)	Scottsdale, Arizona
19:30 PT	Top (yellow card) 69'	Report	Diaz 37', 72'; Pinal 52'	Stadium: Scottsdale Stadium; Attendance: 1,408; Referee: Ramy Touchan

May 20	LA Galaxy II (3-USL)	1–2	Ventura County Fusion (4-PDL)	Carson, California
19:30 PT	Lassiter 45+2' (pen.), (yellow card) 59'; Covarrubias (yellow card) 72'	Report	LaGrassa 38'; Vom Steeg (yellow card) 45+1'; Abolaji (yellow card) 45+2'; Danladi 90+1'	Stadium: StubHub Center; Attendance: 300; Referee: Reyna Fonseca

May 20	Sacramento Republic FC (3-USL)	4–2	Sonoma County Sol (4-NPSL)	Sacramento, California
19:30 PT	Stewart 9', 43', 61'; Gonzalez 12'	Report	Acevedo (yellow card) 14'; Nuno 26', 73'; Arroyo (yellow card) 86'; Boone (yellow card) 90'	Stadium: Bonney Field; Attendance: 10,386; Referee: Chipalo Street

May 20	Seattle Sounders FC 2 (3-USL)	4–2 (a.e.t.)	Kitsap Pumas (4-PDL)	Tukwila, Washington
19:30 PT	Mansaray 26'; Rossi 45', 93'; Garza (yellow card) 79'; Frano (yellow card) 98'; Craven 120+6'	Report	Ramos 66', 90'; Jammeh (yellow card) 67'; Jansen (yellow card) 81'; DeZorzi (yellow card) 92' (yellow-red card) 102'	Stadium: Starfire Stadium; Attendance: 1,766; Referee: Katja Koroleva

=== Third round ===
The third round draw was held on May 14. A total of 30 teams competed, including the 21 winners from the previous round and 9 new entries from the second tier North American Soccer League. The lowest ranked teams this round are PSA Elite and Chula Vista FC from the fifth tier. Among the notable results: In all seven matchups between the third-tier USL and second-tier NASL, the USL clubs were victorious.

May 27	Seattle Sounders FC 2 (3-USL)	2–1 (a.e.t.)	Portland Timbers 2 (3-USL)	Tukwila, Washington
13:00 PT	Craven (yellow card) 63', (goal) 66'; Garza (yellow card) 93'; Rossi 104'	Report	Clarke 54', (yellow card) 90+1'; O'Rourke (yellow card) 74'; Besler (yellow card) 86'; Rose (yellow card) 118'	Stadium: Starfire Stadium; Attendance: 1,737; Referee: Farhad Dadkho

May 27	Harrisburg City Islanders (3-USL)	1–3 (a.e.t.)	Rochester Rhinos (3-USL)	Harrisburg, Pennsylvania
19:00 ET	Barril (yellow card) 8'; Cruz (yellow card) 57'; Tribbett (yellow card) 68'; DiPrima (yellow card) 75'; Jankouskas 106'	Report	Duba (yellow card) 14' (yellow-red card) 38'; Ringhof (yellow card) 98'; Forbes 108'; Samuels 115', (yellow card) 117', (goal) 120'; Walls (yellow card) 119'	Stadium: Skyline Sports Complex; Attendance: 793; Referee: Darth Newman

May 27	Richmond Kickers (3-USL)	3–0	Jacksonville Armada (2-NASL)	Richmond, Virginia
19:00 ET	Ownby 20'; Yeisley 38'; Davis IV 51' (pen.)	Report	Ortiz (yellow card) 21'; Zaldana (yellow card) 45'; Gallardo (yellow card) 51'	Stadium: Richmond City Stadium; Attendance: 1,276; Referee: Matthew Kreitzer

May 27	Pittsburgh Riverhounds (3-USL)	1–0	Tampa Bay Rowdies (2-NASL)	Pittsburgh, Pennsylvania
19:00 ET	Vincent 90+1'	Report	Sweat (yellow card) 15'; Hernandez (yellow card) 81'	Stadium: Highmark Stadium; Attendance: 1,500; Referee: Charles Murphy

May 27	Chattanooga FC (4-NPSL)	1–2 (a.e.t.)	Atlanta Silverbacks (2-NASL)	Chattanooga, Tennessee
19:30 ET	Winter 87'	Report	Bangura 89' (pen.); Reed (yellow card) 105'; Chavez 109'; Okafor (yellow card) 117'	Stadium: Finley Stadium; Attendance: 2,531; Referee: Guido Gonzales

May 27	Carolina RailHawks (2-NASL)	0–1	Charlotte Independence (3-USL)	Cary, North Carolina
19:30 ET	Thompson (yellow card) 34'; Dell (yellow card) 55'	Report	Ribeiro (yellow card) 57'; Newman (yellow card) 77'; Finley 81'	Stadium: WakeMed Soccer Park; Attendance: 832; Referee: Matthew Franz

May 27	Charleston Battery (3-USL)	3–2	Fort Lauderdale Strikers (2-NASL)	Charleston, South Carolina
19:30 ET	Garbanzo 30', (yellow card) 42'; Kelly (yellow card) 56', (goal) 79'; Prince 77'	Report	Nunes 6'; Meves (yellow card) 23'; Gonzalez (yellow card) 33'; Sánchez 41', (yellow card) 90+'; Kling (yellow card) 68' (yellow-red card) 90+3'	Stadium: Blackbaud Stadium; Attendance: 1,551; Referee: David Erbacher

May 27	Indy Eleven (2-NASL)	0–2 (a.e.t.)	Louisville City FC (3-USL)	Indianapolis, Indiana
19:30 ET	Janicki (yellow card) 57'; Wojcik (yellow card) 83'	Report	King (yellow card) 17'; Guzman (yellow card) 83'; Polak 115'; Rivera 119', (yellow card) 120'	Stadium: Carroll Stadium; Attendance: 7,134; Referee: Elvis Mahmutovic

May 27	New York Cosmos (2-NASL)	3–0	Jersey Express S.C. (4-PDL)	Queens, New York
19:30 ET	Fernandes 14'; Caceres (yellow card) 20' (yellow-red card) 90'; Guenzatti 40'; Moffat (yellow card) 85'; Mulligan (yellow card) 87'; Stokkelien 81' (pen.)	Report	Martinez (yellow card) 30'; Feitosa (yellow card) 65'; N’guessan (red card) 80'	Stadium: Belson Stadium; Attendance: 1,394; Referee: Neil Barbulescu

May 27	Saint Louis FC (3-USL)	1–1 (a.e.t.) (3–1 p)	Minnesota United FC (2-NASL)	Fenton, Missouri
19:00 CT	Gaul 80' (pen.), (red card) 114'; Renken (yellow card) 90+1'; Lynch (yellow card) 91'; Vandegriffe (yellow card) 94'	Report	Brent Kallman (yellow card) 21'; Banks 53'; Brian Kallman (yellow card) 114'; Polak (yellow card) 118'	Stadium: World Wide Technology Soccer Park; Attendance: 2,579; Referee: Jon Freemon
	Penalties
	Barklage (penalty scored); Doody (penalty scored); Gasecki (penalty scored)		(penalty missed) Mendes; (penalty missed) Ibson; (penalty scored) Ibarra; (penalty missed) Ramirez

May 27	Tulsa Roughnecks (3-USL)	0–1	Oklahoma City Energy FC (3-USL)	Tulsa, Oklahoma
19:05 CT		Report	Daley (yellow card) 5'; Tóth 82', (yellow card) 90+2'; Dalgaard (yellow card) 85'	Stadium: ONEOK Field; Attendance: 2,584; Referee: Travis Haight

May 27	San Antonio Scorpions (2-NASL)	0–2	Austin Aztex (3-USL)	San Antonio, Texas
19:30 CT	Attakora (yellow card) 34'; DeRoux (yellow card) 67' (yellow-red card) 90'; James (yellow card) 79' (yellow-red card) 90'; Castillo (yellow card) 85'; Elizondo (yellow card) 88'	Report	Guaraci (yellow card) 30'; Ambrose 50'; Caesar 78'	Stadium: Toyota Field; Attendance: 1,100; Referee: Kyle Phillips

May 27	Real Monarchs SLC (3-USL)	0–1	Colorado Springs Switchbacks (3-USL)	Sandy, Utah
19:00 MT	Ovalle (yellow card) 70'	Report	King 5'; Harada (yellow card) 51'; Seth (yellow card) 76'; Bejarano (yellow card) 86'; Badr (yellow card) 90'	Stadium: Rio Tinto Stadium; Attendance: 90; Referee: Brad Jensen

May 27	Ventura County Fusion (4-PDL)	1–2	PSA Elite (5-USASA)	Ventura, California
19:00 PT	Abdullah 72'; La Grassa (yellow card) 90+'	Report	Bjurman 39' (pen.); Smith (yellow card) 67'; Justin 80'	Stadium: Ventura College; Attendance: 300; Referee: Chris Calderon

May 27	Sacramento Republic FC (3-USL)	7–3	Chula Vista FC (5-USASA)	Sacramento, California
19:30 PT	Guzmán 9'; Jakubek (yellow card) 39'; Gabeljic 43', 59', 89'; Stewart 52'; Taublieb (yellow card) 57', (goal) 74'; López 85'	Report	Pinal (yellow card) 25'; Ramirez 40' (pen.); Jakubek 75' (o.g.); Rubio 82'	Stadium: Bonney Field; Attendance: 10,018; Referee: Matthew Buckman

=== Fourth round ===
The fourth round draw was held on May 21. A total of 32 teams will compete, including the 15 winners from the previous round and 17 new entries from top flight Major League Soccer. The lowest ranked team this round is PSA Elite from the fifth tier.

June 16	Philadelphia Union (1-MLS)	0–0 (a.e.t.) (3–1 p)	Rochester Rhinos (3-USL)	Chester, Pennsylvania
19:30 ET	Pfeffer (yellow card) 104'	Report	Totsch (yellow card) 80'; McMahon (yellow card) 90'; Walls (yellow card) 98'; Volesky (yellow card) 103'	Stadium: PPL Park; Referee: Robert Sibiga (New York)
	Penalties
	Edu (penalty scored); Nogueira (penalty scored); Sapong (penalty missed); Maidana (penalty scored)		Mendoza (penalty scored); Apostolopoulos (penalty missed); Walls (penalty missed); Volesky (penalty missed)

June 16	New York Red Bulls (1-MLS)	3–0	Atlanta Silverbacks (2-NASL)	Harrison, New Jersey
19:30 ET	Sam 7'; Zubar 15'; Davis 70'; Wright-Phillips (yellow card) 75'	Report	Mensing (yellow card) 19'; McKenzie (yellow card) 36'; Bangura (yellow card) 57'	Stadium: Red Bull Arena; Attendance: 5,585; Referee: Younes Marrakchi (Colorado)

June 16	Sporting Kansas City (1-MLS)	1–0	Saint Louis FC (3-USL)	Kansas City, Kansas
19:30 CT	Zusi 70'	Report	Barklage (yellow card) 54'; Renken (yellow card) 86'	Stadium: Sporting Park; Attendance: 19,298; Referee: Baboucarr Jallow (Washington)

June 16	Chicago Fire (1-MLS)	1–0 (a.e.t.)	Louisville City FC (3-USL)	Bridgeview, Illinois
19:30 CT	Watson (yellow card) 20'; Ritter (yellow card) 71'; Amarikwa 116'; Gehrig (yellow card) 117'	Report	Montano (yellow card) 53'; Guzman (yellow card) 90+4'	Stadium: Toyota Park; Attendance: 3,544; Referee: Nima Saghafi (Oklahoma)

June 16	FC Dallas (1-MLS)	4–1	Oklahoma City Energy FC (3-USL)	Fort Worth, Texas
20:00 CT	Texeira 21', 51'; Loyd (yellow card) 31'; Barrios 34', 36'	Report	König 82'	Stadium: Garvey-Rosenthal Soccer Stadium; Attendance: 1,106; Referee: Daniel Fitzgerald (North Carolina)

June 16	Colorado Rapids (1-MLS)	4–1	Colorado Springs Switchbacks (3-USL)	Commerce City, Colorado
19:00 MT	Badji 26'; Greenspan 32'; Serna 65', (yellow card) 71', (goal) 90+3'	Report	Bejarano (yellow card) 61'; Phillips (red card) 61'; Burt 90+1'	Stadium: Dick's Sporting Goods Park; Referee: Chipalo Street (Washington)

June 16	Real Salt Lake (1-MLS)	2–1	Seattle Sounders FC 2 (3-USL)	Sandy, Utah
20:00 MT	Stertzer (yellow card) 52'; Plata 63'; Morales 71'	Report	Garza 45+4'; Mansaray (yellow card) 70' (yellow-red card) 90+6'; Sanyang (yellow card) 89'	Stadium: Rio Tinto Stadium; Attendance: 8,208; Referee: Bernhard Hosu (California)

June 16	San Jose Earthquakes (1-MLS)	2–2 (a.e.t.) (6–5 p)	Sacramento Republic FC (3-USL)	San Jose, California
19:30 PT	Wondolowski 74', 79'; Bernárdez (yellow card) 105'	Report	López 6' (pen.); Klimenta 54'	Stadium: Avaya Stadium; Referee: Alex Chilowicz (New Jersey)
	Penalties
	Wondolowski (penalty scored); Bernárdez (penalty scored); Stephenson (penalty missed); Pierazzi (penalty missed); Thompson (penalty scored); Koval (penalty scored); Barrera (penalty scored); Francis (penalty scored)		(penalty scored) López; (penalty scored) Vuković; (penalty missed) Daly; (penalty scored) Gilberto Santos; (penalty missed) Klimenta; (penalty scored) Estrada; (penalty scored) Gabeljic; (penalty missed) Kiffe

June 16	Seattle Sounders FC (1-MLS)	1–3 (a.e.t.)	Portland Timbers (1-MLS)	Tukwila, Washington
19:30 PT	Rose (yellow card) 20'; Evans (yellow card) 39' (yellow-red card) 69'; Martins 79'; Azira (red card) 113'; Dempsey (yellow card) 113' (red card) 114'	Report	Valeri 48'; Paparatto (yellow card) 55'; Jewsbury (yellow card) 106'; Wallace 100'; Peay (yellow card) 111'; Urruti 116'	Stadium: Starfire Sports; Attendance: 4,022; Referee: Daniel Radford (California)

June 17	Pittsburgh Riverhounds (3-USL)	1–3 (a.e.t.)	D.C. United (1-MLS)	Pittsburgh, Pennsylvania
19:00 ET	Vincent 24' (pen.); Flunder (yellow card) 41'	Report	Coria 8'; Arrieta (yellow card) 90+2'; Opare 92'; DeLeon 104'	Stadium: Highmark Stadium; Attendance: 3,988; Referee: Marcos DeOliveira (Florida)

June 17	Richmond Kickers (3-USL)	1–3	Columbus Crew (1-MLS)	Richmond, Virginia
19:00 ET	Sekyere 23'	Report	Bedell 17', 63'; Tchani (yellow card) 35'; Finlay 42'	Stadium: Richmond City Stadium; Attendance: 4,040; Referee: Kevin Terry Jr. (Texas)

June 17	New York Cosmos (2-NASL)	2–2 (a.e.t.) (4–3 p)	New York City FC (1-MLS)	Hempstead, New York
19:30 ET	Gorskie (yellow card) 40'; Fernandes 65'; Szetela (yellow card) 80'; Mkosana 90'; Ayoze (yellow card) 117'; Freeman (yellow card) 118'	Report	Poku 24', 57'; Ballouchy (yellow card) 59'; Wingert (yellow card) 86'; Grabavoy (yellow card) 116'	Stadium: James M. Shuart Stadium; Attendance: 11,940; Referee: Matthew Kreitzer (Maryland)
	Penalties
	Stokkelien (penalty scored); Freeman (penalty missed); Fernandes (penalty missed); Mkosana (penalty scored); Moffat (penalty scored); Gorskie (penalty scored)		(penalty scored) Wingert; (penalty missed) Grabavoy; (penalty scored) Ballouchy; (penalty scored) Diskerud; (penalty missed) Mullins; (penalty missed) Facey

June 17	Charleston Battery (3-USL)	4–4 (a.e.t.) (7–8 p)	Orlando City SC (1-MLS)	Charleston, South Carolina
19:30 ET	vanSchaik 58'; Boyd (yellow card) 63'; Kelly 67'; Portillo 105+2', 116' (pen.)	Report	Neal 63'; Heath (yellow card) 69'; Rivas 76' (pen.), 94' (pen.), 105+2' (pen.); Edwards (yellow card) 115'	Stadium: Blackbaud Stadium; Attendance: 3,459; Referee: Rubiel Vazquez (Florida)
	Penalties
	Portillo (penalty scored); Adjetey (penalty scored); Marini (penalty missed); Prince (penalty missed) vanSchaik (penalty scored); Chang (penalty scored); Cordoves (penalty scored); Kelly (penalty scored); Ferguson (penalty scored); Mueller (penalty missed)		(penalty missed) Rivas; (penalty scored) Ribeiro; (penalty missed) Neal; (penalty scored) St. Ledger; (penalty scored) Okugo; (penalty scored) Ramos; (penalty scored) Heath; (penalty scored) Boden; (penalty scored) Hines; (penalty scored) Mwanga

June 17	New England Revolution (1-MLS)	0–1	Charlotte Independence (3-USL)	Boston, Massachusetts
19:30 ET		Report	Herrera 55'	Stadium: Soldiers Field Soccer Stadium; Attendance: 2,763; Referee: Mark Kadlecik (North Carolina)

June 17	Houston Dynamo (1-MLS)	2–0	Austin Aztex (3-USL)	Houston, Texas
20:00 CT	Miranda 24'; Ashe (yellow card) 36'; Sturgis (yellow card) 48'; Steinberger (yellow card) 68'; Clark 90+2'	Report	Timbó (yellow card) 59'; Ambrose (yellow card) 73'	Stadium: BBVA Compass Stadium; Attendance: 4,041; Referee: Luis Guardia (Texas)

June 17	LA Galaxy (1-MLS)	6–1	PSA Elite (5-USASA)	Carson, California
19:30 PT	Lletget 14'; Zardes 19'; Keane 28', 53', 69'; Husidić 77'	Report	Salazar 11'; Haberkorn (yellow card) 38'	Stadium: StubHub Center; Attendance: 4,055; Referee: Alejandro Mariscal (California)

=== Round of 16 ===
The draw for the fifth round, which took place June 18, placed clubs into four 4-team regions. Clubs from different regions could not be drawn against one another. The lowest ranked team remaining is the Charlotte Independence of the third-tier United Soccer League.

June 30	Orlando City SC (1-MLS)	2–0	Columbus Crew (1-MLS)	Orlando, Florida
19:30 ET	Higuita (yellow card) 12'; Hines (yellow card) 14'; Kaká 21'; Rivas 35'	Report	George (yellow card) 24'; Schoenfeld (yellow card) 39'; Pogatetz (yellow card) 53'	Stadium: Citrus Bowl; Attendance: 13,684; Referee: Mark Kadlecik (North Carolina)

June 30	Philadelphia Union (1-MLS)	2–1	D.C. United (1-MLS)	Chester, Pennsylvania
19:30 ET	Sapong (red card) 24'; Maidana (yellow card) 28'; Ayuk 56'; Fabinho 79'	Report	Jeffrey (yellow card) 23'; Arrieta 27'; Birnbaum (yellow card) 30'; Mishu (yellow card) 37'; Doyle (yellow card) 84'	Stadium: PPL Park; Attendance: 7,000; Referee: Fotis Bazakos (Minnesota)

June 30	Chicago Fire (1-MLS)	3–1	Charlotte Independence (3-USL)	Bridgeview, Illinois
19:30 CT	Magee 37', 82'; Palmer 50'	Report	Zahorski 5'; Slogic (yellow card) 70'	Stadium: Toyota Park; Attendance: 3,617; Referee: Alex Chilowicz (New Jersey)

June 30	Houston Dynamo (1-MLS)	1–0	Colorado Rapids (1-MLS)	Houston, Texas
20:00 CT	Sturgis (yellow card) 11'; Manotas 43'	Report	Hairston (yellow card) 26'; O'Neill (yellow card) 55'	Stadium: BBVA Compass Stadium; Attendance: 2,479; Referee: Nima Saghafi (Oklahoma)

July 1	New York Red Bulls (1-MLS)	4–1	New York Cosmos (2-NASL)	Harrison, New Jersey
19:30 ET	Zizzo 5'; Lade (yellow card) 11'; Abang 42'; Kljestan 54' (pen.); Grella 90'	Report	Mkosana 16'; Restrepo (yellow card) 19'; Gorskie (yellow card) 83'	Stadium: Red Bull Arena; Attendance: 11,442; Referee: Ted Unkel (Florida)

July 1	Sporting Kansas City (1-MLS)	6–2	FC Dallas (1-MLS)	Kansas City, Kansas
19:30 CT	Dwyer 5', 30', 41' (pen.), 69'; Németh 45+1', 59'	Report	Michel (yellow card) 15'; Barrios 62'; Zimmerman (yellow card) 68'; Acosta 73'	Stadium: Sporting Park; Attendance: 19,113; Referee: Robert Sibiga (New York)

July 1	Real Salt Lake (1-MLS)	2–0	Portland Timbers (1-MLS)	Sandy, Utah
20:00 MT	Jaime 54'; Morales 71' (pen.)	Report		Stadium: Rio Tinto Stadium; Attendance: 15,840; Referee: Jose Carlos Rivero (New York)

July 1	San Jose Earthquakes (1-MLS)	0–1	LA Galaxy (1-MLS)	San Jose, California
19:30 PT	Pierazzi (yellow card) 84'; Fucito (yellow card) 87'	Report	Villareal 6'; Mendiola (yellow card) 82'; Rowe (yellow card) 90'	Stadium: Avaya Stadium; Attendance: 13,329; Referee: Allen Chapman (Utah)

=== Quarterfinals ===
All eight quarterfinal teams come from Major League Soccer, the top tier of professional soccer in the United States.

July 14	Real Salt Lake (1-MLS)	1–0	LA Galaxy (1-MLS)	Sandy, Utah
20:00 MT	Maund 87'; Mulholland (yellow card) 89'	Report		Stadium: Rio Tinto Stadium; Attendance: 11,060; Referee: Jose Carlos Rivero (New York)

July 21	New York Red Bulls (1-MLS)	1–1 (a.e.t.) (3–4 p)	Philadelphia Union (1-MLS)	Harrison, New Jersey
16:00 ET	Sam 90+4'; Miazga (yellow card) 118'	Report	Casey (red card) 40'; Fabinho (yellow card) 52'; Ayuk 56'; Nogueira (yellow card) 68'; Carreiro (yellow card) 90+1'	Stadium: Red Bull Arena; Attendance: 9,272; Referee: Chris Penso (Ohio)
	Penalties
	Wright-Phillips (penalty missed); McCarty (penalty scored); Grella (penalty scored); Sam (penalty missed); Kljestan (penalty scored)		Williams (penalty scored); Nogueira (penalty scored); Edu (penalty scored); Carreiro (penalty missed); Aristeguieta (penalty scored)

July 21	Sporting Kansas City (1-MLS)	3–1	Houston Dynamo (1-MLS)	Kansas City, Kansas
19:30 CT	Mustivar (yellow card) 34'; Espinoza (yellow card) 68'; Feilhaber 71'; Dwyer 86'; Németh 88'	Report	Garrido (red card) 30'; Clark (yellow card) 57'; Bruin 59'; Davis (yellow card) 68'; Miranda (yellow card) 75'	Stadium: Sporting Park; Attendance: 17,589; Referee: Ted Unkel (Florida)

July 22	Chicago Fire (1-MLS)	3–1	Orlando City SC (1-MLS)	Bridgeview, Illinois
19:30 CT	Nyarko 3'; Igboananike 87', 90', (yellow card) 89'	Report	Ramos (yellow card) 15'; Larin 56', (yellow card) 80'	Stadium: Toyota Park; Attendance: 4,723; Referee: Edvin Jurisevic (Nebraska)

=== Semifinals ===
August 12	Philadelphia Union (1-MLS)	1–0	Chicago Fire (1-MLS)	Chester, Pennsylvania
19:30 ET	Fabinho (yellow card) 30'; Le Toux 74'	Report	Magee (yellow card) 83'; Cocis (yellow card) 85'	Stadium: PPL Park; Attendance: 5,782; Referee: Juan Guzman (California)

August 12	Sporting Kansas City (1-MLS)	3–1	Real Salt Lake (1-MLS)	Kansas City, Kansas
19:30 CT	Nagamura (yellow card) 30'; Mustivar 35', (yellow card) 75'; Feilhaber 80'; Németh 85'	Report	García 24'; Beltran (yellow card) 76'; Garcia (red card) 93'	Stadium: Sporting Park; Attendance: 16,117; Referee: Armando Villarreal (Texas)

=== Final ===
September 30	Philadelphia Union (1-MLS)	1–1 (a.e.t.) (6–7 p)	Sporting Kansas City (1-MLS)	Chester, Pennsylvania
19:00 ET	Lahoud (yellow card) 21'; Le Toux 23'; Barnetta (yellow card) 58'; Sapong (yellow card) 90+1'	Report	Ellis (yellow card) 29'; Sinovic (yellow card) 34'; Németh 65'; Quintillà (yellow card) 71'; Besler (yellow card) 86'; Nagamura (yellow card) 94'; Zusi (yellow card) 104'; Myers (yellow card) 106'	Stadium: PPL Park; Attendance: 14,463; Referee: Ted Unkel (Florida)
	Penalties
	Le Toux (penalty scored); Nogueira (penalty scored); Edu (penalty missed); Barnetta (penalty scored); Casey (penalty scored); Lahoud (penalty scored); Gaddis (penalty scored); Wenger (penalty missed)		(penalty scored) Feilhaber; (penalty scored) Dwyer; (penalty missed) Németh; (penalty scored) Besler; (penalty scored) Nagamura; (penalty scored) Zusi; (penalty scored) Ellis; (penalty scored) Quintillà

== Top Goalscorers ==
Players and teams still active in bold.

Rank	Scorer	Club	Goals
1	(United States) Dom Dwyer	Sporting Kansas City	5
1	(Hungary) Krisztián Németh	Sporting Kansas City	5
3	(Poland) Tomasz Zahorski	Charlotte Independence	4
3	(Colombia) Carlos Rivas	Orlando City SC	4
3	(Northern Ireland) Thomas Stewart	Sacramento Republic FC	4
6	(Colombia) Michael Barrios	FC Dallas	3
6	(Republic of Ireland) Robbie Keane	LA Galaxy	3
6	(England) Rob Vincent	Pittsburgh Riverhounds	3
6	(United States) Mats Bjurman	PSA Elite	3
6	(Belize) Michael Salazar	PSA Elite	3
6	(United States) Adnan Gabeljic	Sacramento Republic FC	3
6	(Argentina) Pablo Rossi	Seattle Sounders FC 2	3
