= Sports ministry =

A sports ministry is a religious-sponsored organization that use sport to promote links between the religion and the broader population. Notable sports ministries include Athletes in Action (a ministry of Cru), Fellowship of Christian Athletes, and Upward Sports.
