= HMS Guerrière =

Two ships of the Royal Navy have been named HMS Guerriere, French for "warrior".

- The first HMS Guerriere was a 74-gun third-rate ship of the line, originally the French ship Peuple Souverain, captured on 2 July 1798 at the Battle of the Nile. She was used as a sheer hulk from 1800 and broken up in 1810.
- The second HMS Guerriere (1806) was a 38-gun fifth-rate frigate, originally French, captured in 1806 by HMS Blanche off the Faroe Islands. In the War of 1812 she was captured by the American frigate USS Constitution after a battle on 19 August 1812 and burned.

== See also ==
- French ship Guerrière
- USS Guerriere, named after the defeat of HMS Guerriere (1806)
