= French ship Guerrière =

A number of ships of the French Navy have borne the name Guerrière (female form of "warrior").

== Ships named Guerrière ==
- Guerrière (1689), a Duchesse-class ordinary galley.
- Guerrière (1799), a 44-gun frigate.
- Guerrière (1821), a 58-gun razeed frigate, formerly the 74-gun Romulus.
- Guerrière (1860), a sail and steam frigate.
Ships of the French Navy named Guerrière
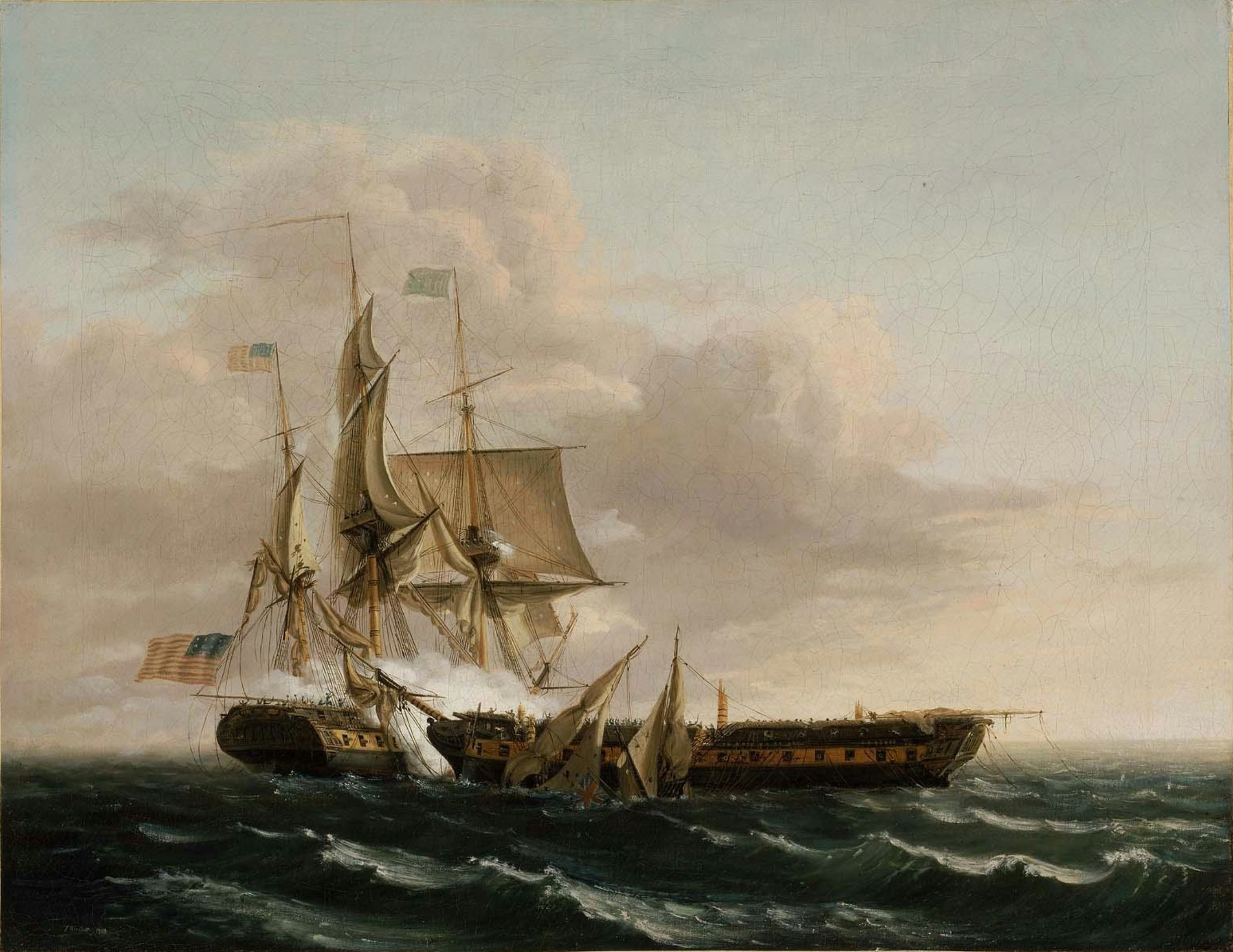
Guerrière (1799), then serving in the Royal Navy as HMS Guerriere, battling USS Constitution

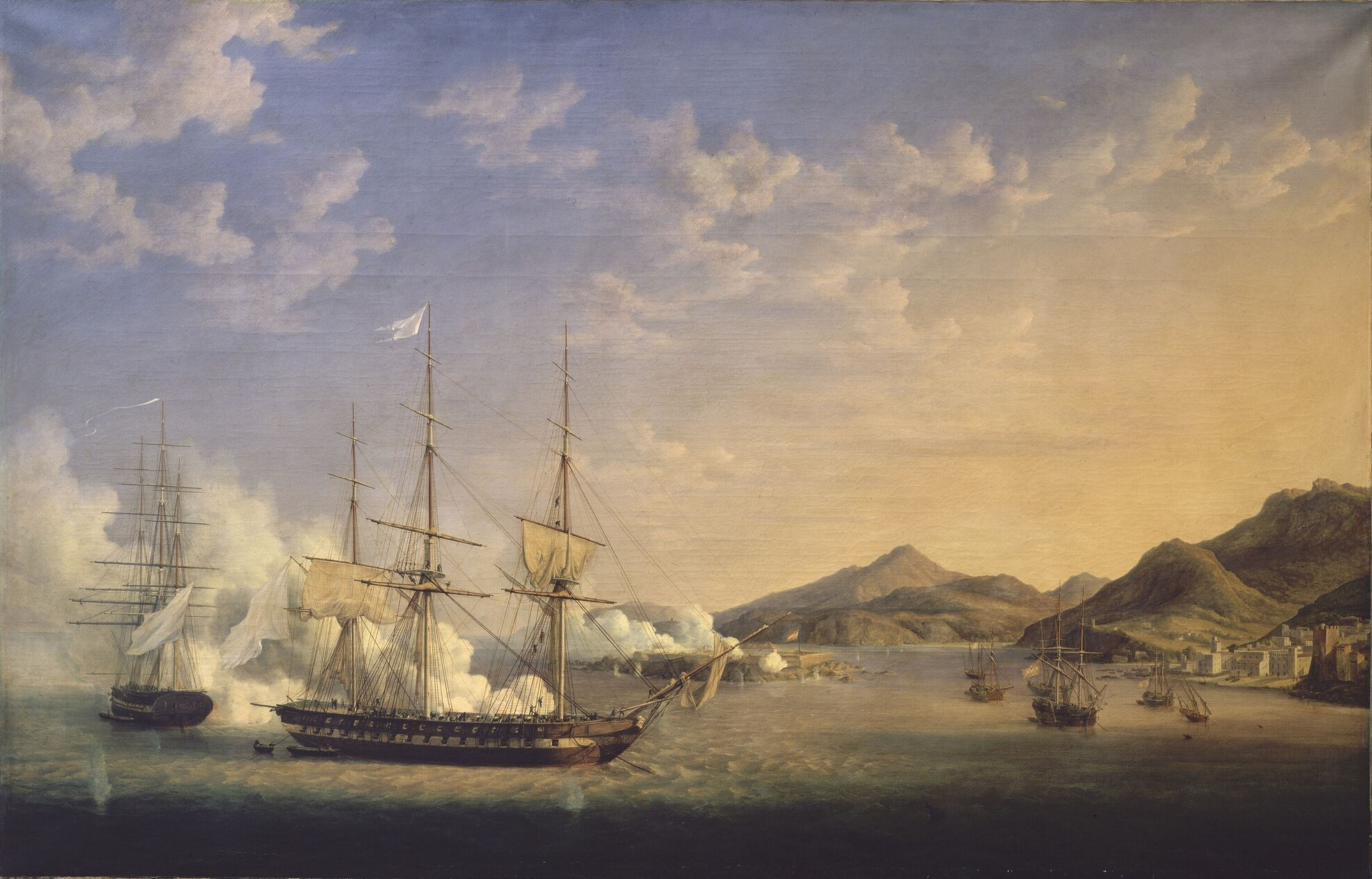
Guerrière (1821) (second from left) attacking Spanish batteries in the Bay of Gibraltar on 13 August 1823

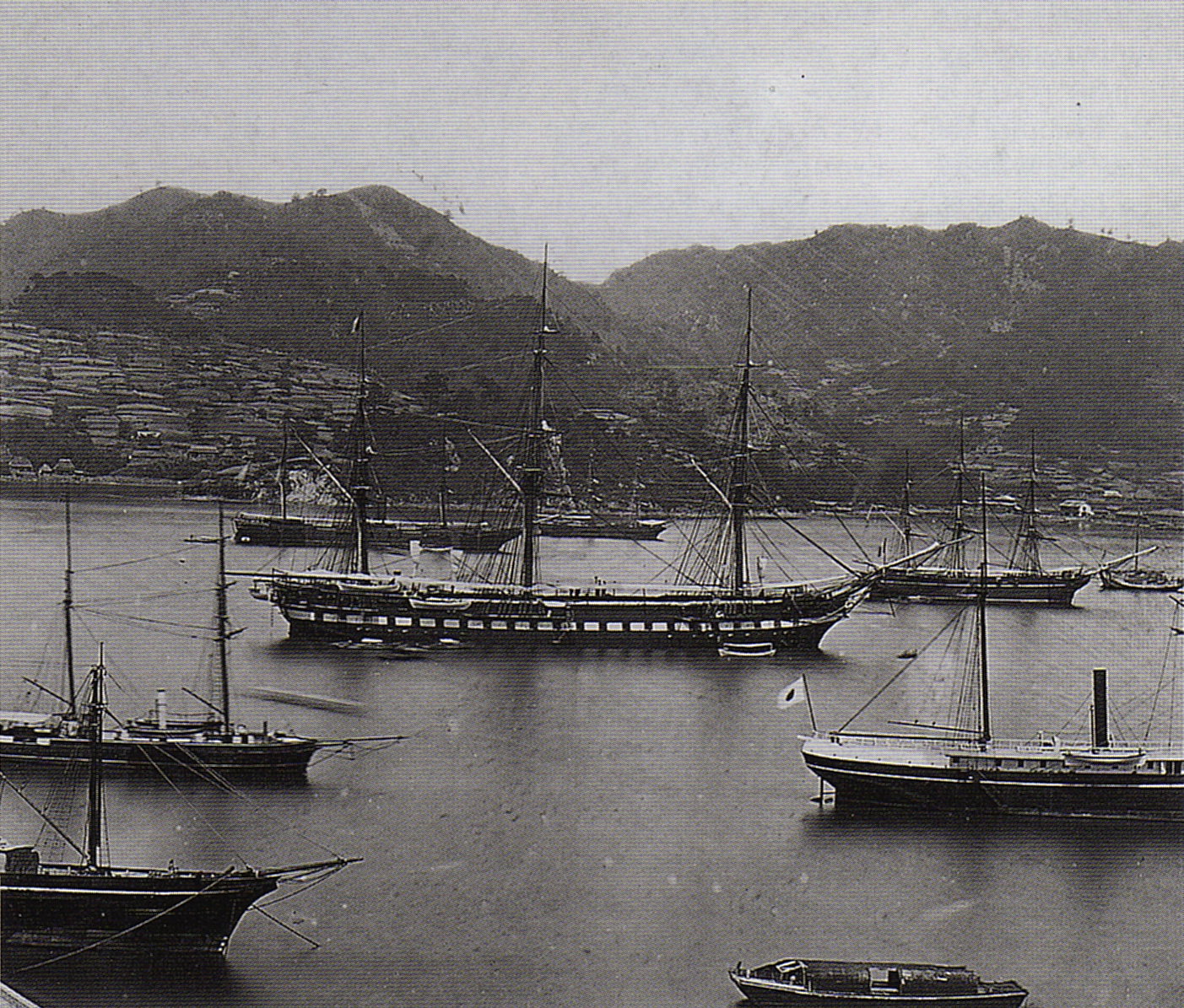
Guerrière (1860)

== See also ==
- French ship Guerrier
- HMS Guerrière

== Notes and references ==
=== Bibliography ===
- Roche, Jean-Michel (2005). Dictionnaire des bâtiments de la flotte de guerre française de Colbert à nos jours. Vol. 1. Group Retozel-Maury Millau. p. 234. ISBN 978-2-9525917-0-6. OCLC 165892922.
- Roche, Jean-Michel (2005). Dictionnaire des bâtiments de la flotte de guerre française de Colbert à nos jours. Vol. 2. Group Retozel-Maury Millau. p. 250. ISBN 978-2-9525917-0-6. OCLC 165892922.
