= Triangle Brigade =

Triangle Brigade FC
- Full name: Triangle Brigade Football Club
- Founded: 2014
- Head coach: Jason Sisneros
- League: Triangle Adult Soccer League

Triangle Brigade Football Club is an American soccer club based in North Carolina's Research Triangle area. Triangle Brigade is a member of the Triangle Adult Soccer League, a United States Adult Soccer Association affiliated league.

== History ==
The club was founded in January 2014 with the stated goal of bringing an elite level of amateur soccer to North Carolina. Triangle Brigade entered the 2015 Lamar Hunt U.S. Open Cup qualification tournament for Region III and won the championship by defeating the defending regional champions NTX Rayados to qualify for the 2015 Lamar Hunt U.S. Open Cup.

== Honors ==
- USASA Region III Open Cup

2014
