= Fellowship of Christian Athletes =

International nonprofit Christian sports ministry

- Abbreviation: FCA
- Formation: 1954; 72 years ago
- Headquarters: Kansas City, Missouri
- Location: Worldwide
- President and CEO: Shane Williamson
- Website: www.fca.org

The Fellowship of Christian Athletes (FCA) is an international nonprofit Christian sports ministry based in Kansas City.

== History ==
FCA was founded in 1954 by Eastern Oklahoma A&M basketball coach Don McClanen, who later resigned to become its full-time director. After watching sports stars use fame to endorse and sell general merchandise, McClanen wrote to 19 prominent sports figures asking for their help in establishing an organization that would use the same principle to share the Christian faith. Among the first supporters were Baseball Hall of Famer Branch Rickey, who was most known for breaking the MLB color barrier by signing Jackie Robinson to the Brooklyn Dodgers in 1945, and professional athletes including Otto Graham, Carl Erskine and Donn Moomaw. FCA held its first advisory board meeting in September 1954 and was officially incorporated as a not-for-profit organization in November.

After two years in Oklahoma, McClanen moved FCA's headquarters to Kansas City, Missouri. That year (1956), FCA also conducted its first national camp‚ then referred to as a national conference‚ which drew 256 athletes and coaches to Estes Park, Colorado. The ministry continued its expansion by adding additional camp locations, establishing a national magazine and beginning school campus groups called "Huddles‚" within 10 years of the first camp. In 1979 FCA completed and dedicated a new headquarters facility overlooking Kansas City‚ Truman Sports Complex, and the building was officially renamed the FCA National Support Center in 2011.

The Fellowship of Christian Athletes operates according to an internally written statement of faith. This statement consists of nine points based on Bible teachings and Christian principles. Each point has a corresponding scripture. All staff and ministry leaders agree with and operate according to the FCA statement of faith. While all students are welcome to attend FCA Huddles, students in leadership are required to sign a statements of faith and sexual purity.

== Criticism ==
In September 2015, public schools in Roanoke, Virginia, ended FCA's ministry to school football players following at least two complaints. In an FCA activity referred to as the "Watermelon Ministry", the organization had visited public high school student athletes at team practices to offer watermelon slices and tell players that all the talents they have come from God. The Freedom From Religion Foundation (FFRF), a national nonprofit organization, referred to the activities as "predatory," "illegal" and "unconstitutional" in letters sent to superintendents of two of the largest Virginia jurisdictions involved.

School officials responded that they were unaware the coaches were engaging in proselytizing and immediately stopped it. The Roanoke County superintendent stated, "Roanoke County Schools believes in the separation of church and state. We want to maintain and ensure that that practice is being followed." A city of Roanoke spokesman said, "When this information came to our attention, we responded immediately. We met with the appropriate people and made it very clear that [the] separation of church and state is the law of the land. We feel the matter is under control and we will monitor this very closely."

Through its media office, FCA issued the following response: "Every student athlete has the right and the freedom to participate in activities according to their individual religious convictions. There are no repercussions for students who decline to participate in FCA activities." The FFRF letters, however, had noted that repercussions may take the form of pressure from peers and coaches, alienating non-Christian students, and usurping parents' authority.

The FCA's sexual purity statement has been criticized because it includes statements against homosexuality and must be signed by FCA representatives of the ministry, including staff, trustees, and adult volunteer ministry leaders. Student leaders sign a Student Leader Application when serving in leadership roles within the organization, which requires signing the sexual purity statement.

The FCA has also come under criticism for excluding members of the Church of Jesus Christ of Latter-day Saints from holding office or receiving scholarships. In 1996, for example, an FCA chapter in Tennessee rescinded an FCA Male Athlete of the Year award given to Aaron Walker because Walker was a member of the Church of Jesus Christ of Latter-day Saints (LDS Church). FCA leaders apologized for how they handled the situation, but claimed that the FCA's official policy was that "Mormons were not Christians"; as such, LDS Church members could not hold FCA offices or receive FCA awards. However, Vern Law, a member of the LDS Church and a Pittsburgh Pirate baseball player in the 1950s and 60s, was featured in early FCA brochures and contributed to the organization's first book intended for an outside audience.

== Professional athletes ==
Since 1954, professional athletes and coaches have taken part in FCA ministry events, speaking engagements, camps, volunteering and leadership roles. Athletes and coaches from both major and minor professional sports and college programs have engaged with FCA and participated in community outreach opportunities. Among early members of the organization were Otto Graham, Branch Rickey, Bobby Richards, Carl Erskine and Bill Krisher. Later, other influential sports figures included Bobby Bowden, Jim Ryun, Betsy King, Herschel Walker, Reggie White, Tony Dungy, Shaun Alexander, Tom Osborne, and Shanna Zolman, all of whom participated in FCA outlets, banquets, camps and rallies. Other individuals have included Adam Wainwright, Brian Roberts, Tim Tebow, Tamika Catchings, John Harbaugh, Leah O'Brien Amico, Allyson Felix, Colt McCoy, Andrew McCutchen, and a number of public figures outside sports, including comedian Jeff Foxworthy and Duck Dynasty personality and Christian right activist Willie Robertson.

== Awards ==
FCA presents several national awards every year to athletes and coaches who have excelled in specific areas of competition, community service and Christian character.

=== Bobby Bowden Award ===
Named after former Florida State University football coach Bobby Bowden, this award is presented annually to a Division I FBS football player who conducts himself as a faith model in the community, in the classroom and on the field. Nominees must have 3.0 grade point average or higher and the backing of his school‚ athletic director, and head coach.

Winners of the Bobby Bowden Award
Year	Athlete	School	Position
2003	Jason Wright	Northwestern	Running back
2004	Billy Bajema	Oklahoma State	Tight end
2005	D. J. Shockley	Georgia	Quarterback
2006	Carl Pendleton	Oklahoma	Defensive tackle
2007	Jacob Tamme	Kentucky	Tight end
2008	Stephen McGee	Texas A&M	Quarterback
2009	Colt McCoy	Texas	Quarterback
2010	Christian Ponder	Florida State	Quarterback
2011	Case Keenum	Houston	Quarterback
2012	Ashton Richardson	Auburn	Linebacker
2013	Jake Matthews	Texas A&M	Offensive tackle
2014	Bryce Petty	Baylor	Quarterback
2015	Ty Darlington	Oklahoma	Center
2016	Deshaun Watson	Clemson	Quarterback
2017	Mason Rudolph	Oklahoma State	Quarterback
2018	Hunter Renfrow	Clemson	Wide receiver
2019	Tua Tagovailoa	Alabama	Quarterback
2020	Trevor Lawrence	Clemson	Quarterback
2021	Malik Willis	Liberty	Quarterback

=== Grant Teaff Coach of the Year ===
The Grant Teaff Coach of the Year Award is named after former Baylor University football coach Grant Teaff, who also served as the executive director of the American Football Coaches Association and member of the FCA National Board of Trustees. The annual award recognizes a football coach who exemplifies Christian principles and maintains an active involvement with FCA. Previous winners include Matt Campbell, Scott Frost, Mike MacIntyre, Mike London, Tommy Bowden, Jerry Kill and Tommy Tuberville.

=== Kay Yow Heart of a Coach Award ===
First presented in 2008, this award was established to honor former North Carolina State University women's basketball coach Kay Yow, who died after a nearly 22-year battle with cancer. The award recognizes a women's basketball coach who‚ over the course of his or her career, has coached according to Biblical principles‚ and has coached the heart of the athlete, as well as the body and mind. Previous winners include Carey Green, Lynn Plett, Julie Goodenough, Sue Semrau, Deb Patterson, Sue Ramsey and Kay Yow.

== See also ==
- Athletes in Action
- Upward Sports
- Muscular Christianity
