= OSA Seattle FC =

- Full name: Olympic Soccer Academy Seattle Football Club
- Founded: 2008 as FC Tacoma 253
- Stadium: Starfire Sports Complex; Tukwila, Washington
- Capacity: 6,000
- Owner: Giuseppe Pezzano
- Head Coach: Juan Pablo Murillo
- League: National Premier Soccer League
- 2019: Northwest Conference: 2nd Playoffs: Regional Quarterfinals
- Website: osaseattlefc.com
Home colors	Away colors

OSA Seattle FC, formerly FC Tacoma 253, is an American association football (soccer) club based in the Seattle metro area. The team plays within the Northwest Conference of the National Premier Soccer League, a national league generally considered the fourth-tier of the American Soccer Pyramid.

It is affiliated with a women's team, OSA XF (formerly AC Seattle), which competes in the semi-professional Women's Premier Soccer League. Both are run by OSA Soccer Academy, LLC.

== History ==
=== League ===
FC Tacoma 253 was announced as an National Premier Soccer League expansion team in November 2014, with plans to begin play the following season. Tacoma tied Real San Jose, 1-1, at home in its first-ever league match on March 28, 2015. Abdi Galgalo scored the team's first league goal.

The club's first notable signing was of Oussama Essabr, a Moroccan product of the Juventus F.C. Youth Sector. Shortly thereafter, the club acquired Samuele Piccinotti from Serie D A.S. Varese 1910's academy along with Marco Dugo, Gianmarco Peressini, and Stefano Layeni.

The team finished its inaugural season as champions of the Northwest Conference, which secured qualification for the 2015 NPSL West Region playoffs. However, the team lost to Sacramento Gold FC, 3–2, in extra time in its first match.

During the offseason, following meetings between head coach Filippo Milano and owner Giuseppe Pezzano, the team re-branded to OSA FC with plans to integrate more Italian talent alongside young American players. The newly branded team finished the 2016 NPSL season first in the Northwest Conference for a second straight year, defeating Portland Spartans FC, 2–1, on July 2. OSA earned the organizations first playoff win the West Region first round when it beat CD Aguiluchos USA, 3–2, on the road. The team fell to West Region top seed Albion SC Pros in the region semifinal.

Prior to the 2020 NPSL season, the team changed its name to OSA Seattle FC.

=== U.S. Open Cup ===
Prior to the 2015 regular season's start Tacoma played its inaugural match on February 20, 2015 in a qualifier for the 2015 Lamar Hunt U.S. Open Cup, in which they defeated fellow Northwest Conference team and Oregon-based Spartans Futbol Club, 2–1, at Starfire Sports. On March 22, 2015, In its second match, FC Tacoma beat Southwest Conference representative San Diego Flash, 6–1, at Memorial Stadium (Seattle), and officially qualified for the 2015 U.S. Open Cup.

Tacoma faced the Kitsap Pumas in the first round of the tournament on May 13, 2015, and lost, 5–2. Steven Wright scored the team's first ever goal in the tournament, while Pedro Milan picked up the second.

The team, now playing under the OSA name, qualified for a second time via an at-large bid based on its 2016 NPSL results. In the 2017 U.S. Open Cup First round, OSA won its first ever tournament game when it defeated Seattle Sounders FC U-23 in a penalty kick shootout, 0-0 (5-3), on May 10, 2017. A week later in the second round, the team played to a second straight penalty kick shootout against United Soccer League side Reno 1868 FC where it lost, 1-1 (3-4).

== Stadiums ==
Name	Location	Years
Memorial Stadium	Seattle, Washington	2015 1 NPSL match, 1 U.S. Open Cup Qualifying match
Starfire Sports Complex	Tukwila, Washington	2015, 2017–present
French Field	Kent, Washington	2016
Kentlake Stadium	Kent, Washington	2016
Highline Memorial Stadium	Burien, Washington	2017, 2019
Renton Memorial Stadium	Renton, Washington	2019

== Crest history ==
FC Tacoma 253
(2015)

OSA FC
(2016–2019)

OSA Seattle FC
(2020–present)

== Year-by-year ==
Year	League	Regular season	Playoffs	U.S. Open Cup	Notes
2015	NPSL	1st, Northwest Conference	Regional first round	First round	Lost to Sacramento Gold FC in the West Region First round
2016	NPSL	1st, Northwest Conference	Regional semifinal	did not qualify	Lost to Albion SC Pros in the West Region Semifinal
2017	NPSL	5th, Northwest Conference	did not qualify	Second Round	
2018	NPSL	4th, Northwest Conference	did not qualify	did not qualify	
2019	NPSL	2nd, Northwest Conference	Regional Quarterfinal	did not qualify	Lost to Crossfire Redmond in the West Region Quarterfinal
2020	NPSL	Season cancelled due to COVID-19 pandemic			

== Honors ==
National Premier Soccer League

Northwest Conference Champions (2): 2015, 2016
