= Guerrier =

Guerrier (French: warrior) is a French surname that may refer to

- André Guerrier (1874–?), French Olympic sailor
- Akia Guerrier (born 1998), female sprinter for the Turks and Caicos Islands
- Edith Guerrier (1870–1958), American librarian
- Edmund Guerrier (1840–1921), American interpreter
- Francis Guerrier (1896–1969), French aviator
- John Walter Guerrier Lund (1912–2015), English phycologist
- Julien Guerrier (born 1985), French golfer
- Matt Guerrier (born 1978), American baseball pitcher
- Philippe Guerrier (1757–1845), President of Haïti
- Prosper Guerrier de Dumast (1796–1883), French Catholic figure
- Quincy Guerrier (born 1999), Canadian basketball player
- Simon Guerrier (born 1976), British science fiction author and dramatist
- Vladimir Guerrier (1837–1919), Russian historian
- Wilde-Donald Guerrier (born 1989), Haitian football player
- William Guerrier (1812–1858), American businessman

== See also ==
- French ship Guerrier
