= USS Guerriere =

Two ships in the United States Navy have been named USS Guerriere, after HMS Guerriere which USS Constitution had defeated in battle during the War of 1812.

- USS Guerriere (1814) was a frigate launched in 1814. She saw service in the Second Barbary War and was decommissioned in 1831
- USS Guerriere (1865) was a frigate launched in 1865. She served in the American Civil War and was decommissioned in 1872.
