= French ship Guerrier =

A number of ships of the French navy have borne the name Guerrier (male form of "warrior").

== Ships named Guerrier ==
- Guerrier (1753), a Magnifique-class 74-gun ship of the line.
- Guerrier (1796), a gun-bearing boar, also named Bateau-canonnier no 1.
- Guerrier (1796), a gunboat.
- Guerrier (1800), a xebec.
Ships of the French Navy named Guerrier
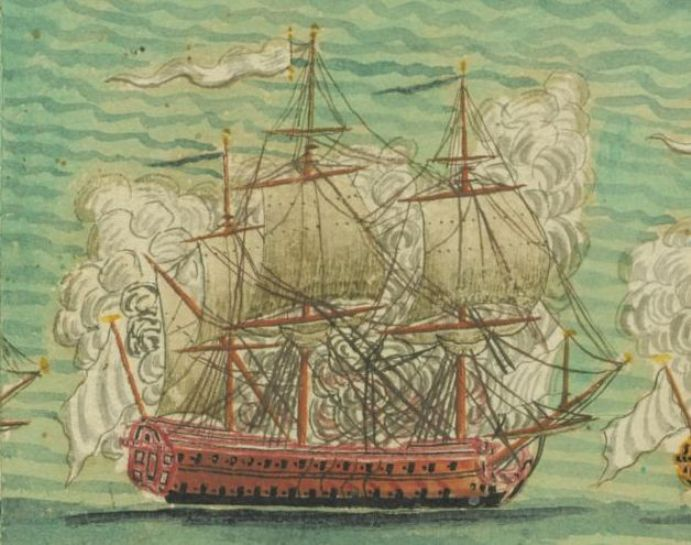
Guerrier (1753) at the Battle of Minorca (1756)

== See also ==
- French ship Guerrière

== Notes and references ==
=== Bibliography ===
- Roche, Jean-Michel (2005). Dictionnaire des bâtiments de la flotte de guerre française de Colbert à nos jours. Vol. 1. Group Retozel-Maury Millau. p. 234. ISBN 978-2-9525917-0-6. OCLC 165892922.
- Roche, Jean-Michel (2005). Dictionnaire des bâtiments de la flotte de guerre française de Colbert à nos jours. Vol. 2. Group Retozel-Maury Millau. ISBN 978-2-9525917-0-6. OCLC 165892922.
