= PSA Elite =

- Full name: PSA Elite
- Founded: 2002
- Ground: PSA Soccer Field; Irvine, California
- Capacity: 500
- Owner: Alex Lujan
- Technical Director: Jon Spencer
- League: USASA; So Cal Premier
- Website: www.Facebook.com/PsaElite

PSA Elite is an American amateur soccer club based in Irvine, California that plays in the So Cal Premier of the United States Adult Soccer Association. The club is best known for their runs in both the 2014 and the 2015 Lamar Hunt U.S. Open Cups, when the team knocked out professional teams and reached the fourth round of each tournament.
