= KC Athletics =

American amateur soccer team

- Full name: Kansas City Athletics Football Club
- Founded: 2001
- Head Coach: Kyle Perkins
- League: USASA
| Home colors | Away colors |

KC Athletics is an American amateur soccer team based in Kansas City, Missouri, United States. Founded in 2001, the team plays in Region II of the United States Adult Soccer Association, a network of amateur leagues at the fifth tier of the American Soccer Pyramid.

The team's colors are white and sky blue.

== History ==
Founded in 2001 as a merger of the Kansas Legends Soccer Club and the Kansas City Football Club, the KC Athletics won regionals in its first year competing in the Snickers Nationals, and ended up finishing third nationally in the competition. The following year, their Under-20 team won a national championship, but then the club went on hiatus with many of the players joining nearby PDL clubs like the Des Moines Menace and the Kansas City Brass. In 2004, the KC Athletics were reborn.

The Athletics entered the Lamar Hunt U.S. Open Cup for the first time in 2010, and qualified for the tournament at the first attempt, beating USOC mainstays AAC Eagles 5-3 on penalties in their final qualification game. They lost in the first round of the tournament proper, 4-2 to USSF Division 2 Professional League side NSC Minnesota Stars. The Athletics' goals were scored by Stephen Hoffman and Kyle Perkins.

On April 14, 2012, the Athletics traveled to Chicago to play in the "Win and You're In" Region II Qualification match to earn a berth in the 2012 Lamar Hunt U.S. Open Cup. The Athletics defeated the Cincy Saints 10-2 to qualify for their second U.S. Open Cup berth since 2010.

== Players ==
=== 2012 USASA roster ===
Note: Flags indicate national team as defined under FIFA eligibility rules; some limited exceptions apply. Players may hold more than one non-FIFA nationality.

| No. | Pos. | Nation | Player |
|---|---|---|---|
| — | DF | USA | Oran Andrews |
| — | GK | USA | Steven Grow |
| — | DF | USA | Ben Hicks |
| — | DF | USA | Stephen Hoffman |
| — | MF | USA | Martin Johnston |
| — | DF | USA | Coady Andrews |

| No. | Pos. | Nation | Player |
|---|---|---|---|
| — | MF | USA | Josh McDaniel |
| — | FW | USA | Garrett Webb |
| — | FW | USA | Kyle Perkins |
| — | MF | USA | Peter Kariotis |
| — | MF | USA | Chris Markey |
| — | DF | USA | Brian Williams |

== Year-by-year ==
| Year | Division | League | Regular season | Playoffs | Open Cup |
|---|---|---|---|---|---|
| 2010 | 5 | USASA | | | First Round |

== Head coaches ==
- (United States) Kyle Perkins (2009–present)
