= 2014 NPSL season =

National Premier Soccer League
- Season: 2014
- Champions: New York Red Bulls U-23 (1st Title)
- Regular Season Champions: New York Red Bulls U-23 (1st Title)
- Matches: 437
- Goals: 1,668 (3.82 per match)
- Best Player: (Ecuador) Victor Manosalvas (New York Red Bulls U-23)
- Top goalscorer: (Ecuador) Victor Manosalvas (New York Red Bulls U-23); Jason Jones (Sacramento Gold) (United States) David Hernandez (Spartans FC) (12 Goals Each)
- Best goalkeeper: (England) Gregory Hartley (Chattanooga FC)
- Highest attendance: 8,878 - July 26, 2014 Chattanooga FC v. Sacramento Gold

The 2014 NPSL season was the 102nd season of FIFA-sanctioned soccer in the United States, and the 12th season of the National Premier Soccer League. The season began in May 2014. RVA Football Club were the defending champions, having won their first NPSL title the previous season.

== Changes from 2013 ==
The league added a new Northwest Conference in the West Region in 2014. The league also split the Great Lakes Conference into two separate conferences, Great Lakes East and Great Lakes West. The Mid-Atlantic Conference was split in two with teams from Virginia and Maryland staying within the Conference and moving to the Northeast Region (including defending Champion RVA Football Club) and the remaining teams forming the new South Atlantic Conference. The Atlantic Conference was also renamed the North Atlantic Conference. The following changes regarding team relocation, rebranding, or expansion are effective for the 2014 NPSL season:

Locations of NPSL clubs for 2014. Blue = Northeast Region clubs, Yellow = South Region clubs, Green = Midwest Region clubs, Red = West Region clubs

=== New teams ===
Team name	Metro area	Location	Region / Conference	Previous affiliation
Greater Lowell United FC	Lowell, MA	Lowell, MA	Northeast - North Atlantic	Expansion Team
Electric City Shock SC	Scranton-Wilkes-Barre, PA	Scranton, PA	Northeast - Keystone	Expansion Team
ASA Charge	Baltimore, MD	Gambrills, MD	Northeast - Mid-Atlantic	Expansion Team
Legacy 76	Williamsburg, VA	Williamsburg, VA	Northeast - Mid-Atlantic	Expansion Team
Virginia Beach City FC	Virginia Beach, VA	Virginia Beach, VA	Northeast - Mid-Atlantic	Expansion Team
Carolina RailHawks U-23's	Raleigh, North Carolina	Cary, North Carolina	South - South Atlantic	Expansion Team
FC Carolina Discoveries	Rock Hill, SC	Rock Hill, SC	South - South Atlantic	Expansion Team
Gate City FC	Greensboro, NC	Greensboro, NC	South - South Atlantic	Expansion Team
Upward Stars	Spartanburg, SC	Spartanburg, SC	South - South Atlantic	Expansion Team
Storm FC	Broward County, FL	Broward County, FL	South - Sunshine	Expansion Team
Atlanta Silverbacks Reserves	Atlanta, GA	Atlanta, GA	South - Southeast	Returning Team
Nashville Atlas FC	Nashville, TN	Nashville, TN	South - Southeast	Expansion Team
BCS Clash	Bryan-College Station, TX	College Station, TX	South - South Central (South Division)	Expansion Team
Corinthians FC of San Antonio	San Antonio, TX	San Antonio, TX	South - South Central (South Division)	Expansion Team
Dallas City FC	Dallas–Fort Worth, TX	Flower Mound, TX	South - South Central (South Division)	Expansion Team
Fort Worth Vaqueros FC	Dallas–Fort Worth, TX	Fort Worth, TX	South - South Central (South Division)	Expansion Team
Joplin Demize	Joplin, MO	Joplin, MO	South - South Central (North Division)	Expansion Team
Oklahoma City FC	Oklahoma City, OK	Oklahoma City, OK	South - South Central (North Division)	Expansion Team
Fort Pitt FC Regiment	Pittsburgh, PA	Pittsburgh, PA	Midwest - Great Lakes East	Expansion Team
Cincinnati Saints	Cincinnati, OH	Cincinnati, OH	Midwest - Great Lakes West	Expansion Team
Indiana Fire NPSL	Indianapolis, IN	Westfield, IN	Midwest - Great Lakes West	Expansion Team
Lansing United	Lansing, MI	Lansing, MI	Midwest - Great Lakes West	Expansion Team
Minnesota United FC Reserves	Minneapolis-Saint Paul, MN	Woodbury, MN	Midwest - Central	Expansion Team
FC Bordo Saint Louis	St. Louis, MO	St. Louis, MO	Midwest - Central	Expansion Team
Del Rey City SC	Los Angeles, CA	Marina del Rey, CA	West - Southwest	Expansion Team
FC Force	El Centro, CA	Holtville, CA	West - Southwest	Expansion Team
Temecula FC	Riverside, CA	Temecula, CA	West - Southwest	Expansion Team
Gorge FC	Hood River, OR	Hood River, OR	West - Northwest	Expansion Team
Inter United FC	Seattle, WA	Tukwila, WA	West - Northwest	Expansion Team
Seattle Sporting FC	Seattle, WA	Seattle, WA	West - Northwest	Expansion Team
Spartans Futbol Club	Portland, OR	Vancouver, WA	West - Northwest	Expansion Team

=== Changes ===
Team name	Type of Change	Comment
Georgia Revolution	Conference Change	From Sunshine to Southeast Conference
Indiana Fire NPSL	Rebranding	Rebranding from Westfield Select to Indiana Fire NPSL
Michigan Stars FC	Rebranding	Rebranding from FC Sparta Michigan
Nashville FC	Rebranding	Rebranding from Nashville Atlas FC to Nashville FC
Pensacola City FC	Rebranding	Rebranding from Gulf Coast Texans
San Diego iCon FC	Rebranding	Rebranding from San Diego Boca FC

=== Withdrew / on hiatus ===
Team name	Location	Reason
Houston Hurricanes FC	Houston, TX	Withdrew, Self Relegated to Texas Premier Soccer League.
Milwaukee Bavarians	Milwaukee, WI	On Hiatus
Morris County Colonials	Morris Plains, NJ	Withdrew, Self Relegated to US Club Soccer National Adult League, North East Premier Division
Regals SCA	Houston, TX	On Hiatus, Self Relegated to Texas Premier Soccer League.
Zanesville Athletic FC	Zanesville, OH	Withdrew, Folded
FC Reading Revolution	Reading, PA	On Hiatus
CASL Elite	Cary, NC	Withdrew, Folded
Las Vegas Stallions	Las Vegas, NV	Withdrew, Folded
Mississippi Storm	Ocean Springs, MS	Withdrew, Folded
Orange County Pateadores FC	Santa Ana, CA	Withdrew, Folded
San Diego iCon FC	San Diego, CA	Withdrew, Folded

=== Personnel and sponsorship ===
Team	Head coach	Captain	Kit manufacturer	Shirt sponsor	Region - Conference
Brooklyn Italians	(United States) Lucio Russo		Puma		Northeast - North Atlantic
Greater Lowell United FC	(United States) Jason Moore		Admiral		Northeast - North Atlantic
New York Athletic Club	(United States) Barclay MacKinnon		Nike		Northeast - North Atlantic
New York Red Bull NPSL			Adidas	Red Bull	Northeast - North Atlantic
Rhode Island Reds F.C.			Admiral		Northeast - North Atlantic
Seacoast United Mariners			Nike		Northeast - North Atlantic
Seacoast United Phantoms			Nike		Northeast - North Atlantic
Buxmont Torch FC					Northeast - Keystone
Clarkstown SC Eagles			Adidas		Northeast - Keystone
Electric City Shock SC	James Bell			Dickson City Hyundai	Northeast - Keystone
FC Lehigh Valley United Sonic			Adidas	Service Electric	Northeast - Keystone
GBFC Thunder					Northeast - Keystone
Hershey FC			Adidas		Northeast - Keystone
Junior Lone Star FC	(Liberia) Bobby Ali		Adidas		Northehast - Keystone
Pocono Snow			Adidas		Northeast - Keystone
ASA Charge	(United States) Tim Wittman		Adidas		Northeast - Mid-Atlantic
Chesterfield United FC			Puma		Northeast - Mid-Atlantic
DC United Academy U23			Adidas		Northeast - Mid-Atlantic
Legacy 76	(United States) Tim Cristian				Northeast - Mid-Atlantic
RVA Football Club			Nike		Northeast - Mid-Atlantic
Virginia Beach City FC	Brian Hinkey		Adidas	SOLitude Lake Management	Northeast - Mid-Atlantic
Carolina RailHawks U-23's	(United States) Dewan Bader		Adidas		South - South Atlantic
FC Carolina Discoveries	Dave Carton		Stanno		South - South Atlantic
Gate City FC	(United States) Brian Japp		Lotto		South - South Atlantic
Myrtle Beach FC			Hummel		South - South Atlantic
Upward Stars	(England) Paul Henson				South - South Atlantic
Cape Coral Hurricanes			Adidas		South - Sunshine
Jacksonville United			Nike	Apex Technologies	South - Sunshine
Miami United	(Colombia) Diego Serna		Garman	GaGà Milano	South - Sunshine
Storm FC			Adidas		South - Sunshine
Tampa Marauders FC					South - Sunshine
Atlanta Silverbacks Reserves			Nike	People HRO	South - Southeast
Chattanooga FC	(United States) Bill Elliott		Diodora	Volkswagen	South - Southeast
Georgia Revolution					South - Southeast
Knoxville Force			Admiral	ORNL Federal Credit Union	South - Southeast
Nashville FC	(United States) Giles Cheevers		Admiral		South - Southeast
Pensacola City FC			Admiral		South - Southeast
New Orleans Jesters			Admiral	Louisiana CAT	South - Southeast
Rocket City United					South - Southeast
BCS Clash	(United States) David Gutierrez		Adidas	Cellucor	South - South Central (South Division)
Corinthians FC of San Antonio	(United States) Jonathan Burklo		Under Armour	Universal Toyota	South - South Central (South Division)
Dallas City FC	(Turkey) Rahim Zafer		Nike		South - South Central (South Division)
Fort Worth Vaqueros FC	(United States) Mark Snell		Puma	Hispano Exito	South - South Central (South Division)
Joplin Demize	Chris Hanlon		Admiral	Hershewe Law Firm	South - South Central (North Division)
Liverpool Warriors			Warrior		South - South Central (North Division)
Oklahoma City FC			Hummel	Oklahoma Lottery	South - South Central (North Division)
Tulsa Athletics	(United States) Joey Ryan		Adidas	The McNellies Group	South - South Central (North Division)
AFC Cleveland			Givova	Rocky River Urgent Care	Midwest - Great Lakes East
Erie Admirals S.C.			Puma	Burger King	Midwest - Great Lakes East
FC Buffalo	(United States) Brendan Murphy		Admiral	Rich's	Midwest - Great Lakes East
Fort Pitt FC Regiment	(Poland) John Kowalski				Midwest - Great Lakes East
Cincinnati Saints	(Scotland) Gavin MacLeod		Admiral	Cincinnati Sub-Zero	Midwest - Great Lakes West
Detroit City FC	(United States) Ben Pirmann		Nike		Midwest - Great Lakes West
Indiana Fire NPSL	John Simmonds		Adidas		Midwest - Great Lakes West
Lansing United	(United States) Eric Rudland		Nike		Midwest - Great Lakes West
Michigan Stars FC	Sam Piraine		Adidas		Midwest - Great Lakes West
Eau Claire Aris FC			Adidas		Midwest - Central
FC Bordo Saint Louis					Midwest - Central
Madison 56ers			Adidas		Midwest - Central
Minnesota Twin Stars			Adidas		Midwest - Central
Minnesota United FC Reserves			Admiral		Midwest - Central
Quad City Eagles			Admiral	AdmiralSoccer.com	Midwest - Central
Del Rey City SC	(United States) Jorge Rodriguez		Nike		West - Southwest
FC Force					West - Southwest
FC Hasental			Xara		West - Southwest
FC Santa Clarita			Admiral	Nissan of Valencia	West - Southwest
San Diego Flash	(United States) Jerome Watson		Admiral		West - Southwest
Temecula FC	Brandon Jantz		Admiral	Quail Real Estate	West - Southwest
CD Aguiluchos USA	(Argentina) Hugo Coria		Adidas		West - Golden Gate
Real San Jose					West - Golden Gate
Sacramento Gold				Unger Construction	West - Golden Gate
San Francisco Stompers FC	(United States) William P. Forte (interim)		Vizari	Recnball Inc	West - Golden Gate
Sonoma County Sol	(United States) Vincent Cortezzo		Nike		West - Golden Gate
Gorge FC	(Brazil) Thiago Samba			ColumbiaGorge.com	West - Northwest
Inter United FC	Nasir Tura		Adidas		West - Northwest
Seattle Sporting FC	(Mexico) Hugo Alcaraz-Cuellar		Admiral	AdmiralSoccer.com	West - Northwest
Spartans Futbol Club	Victor Usher-Garcette		Nike		West - Northwest

== Standings and results ==
=== Northeast Region ===
The region held its annual general meeting in New York, New York, on January 19 at the New York Athletic Club. The region had a third conference for the first time, with the Mid-Atlantic Conference joining the region. The Atlantic Conference was also renamed the North Atlantic Conference.

==== North Atlantic Conference ====
The conference included 7 teams spread across 6 different states for the 2014 season with the addition of expansion club Greater Lowell United FC. Kabba Joof, Head Coach of Rhode Island Reds FC served as the Conference commissioner. The maximum travel distance for the season was between Seacoast United Mariners and the New York City area clubs at just over 300 miles. The Conference was called simply the Atlantic Conference in previous seasons.

Team	Founded	Home city	Stadium	Capacity
Brooklyn Italians	1949	Brooklyn, New York	John Dewey High School	~1,000
Greater Lowell United FC	2013	Lowell, Massachusetts	Cawley Memorial Stadium	6,000
New York Athletic Club	2008	Pelham, New York	New York Athletic Club	2,000
New York Red Bulls U-23	2010	Hanover, New Jersey	Red Bull Training Facility	500
Rhode Island Reds FC	2012	Providence, Rhode Island	Cranston Stadium	5,000
Seacoast United Mariners	2012	Scarborough, Maine	Scarborough HS	~1,000
Seacoast United Phantoms	2011	Portsmouth, New Hampshire	Portsmouth HS Stadium	~1,000

Pos	Team	Pld	W	D	L	GF	GA	GD	Pts	Promotion or relegation
1	New York Red Bulls NPSL (C)	12	12	0	0	54	4	+50	36	North Atlantic Conference Champion
2	Brooklyn Italians (Q)	12	10	0	2	33	14	+19	30	Northeast Region Playoffs
3	Seacoast United Phantoms	12	5	1	6	21	31	−10	16	
4	New York Athletic Club	12	4	3	5	19	12	+7	15	
5	Rhode Island Reds FC	12	2	4	6	17	29	−12	10	
6	Seacoast United Mariners	12	2	3	7	15	33	−18	9	
7	Greater Lowell United FC	12	1	1	10	8	44	−36	4	

Updated to match(es) played on July 12, 2014. Source: NPSL Standings
Rules for classification: 1) points; 2) goal difference; 3) number of goals scored.
(C) Conference Champions; (Q) Qualified for the phase indicated

==== Keystone Conference ====
Team	Founded	Home city	Stadium	Capacity
Buxmont Torch FC	2010	Perkasie, Pennsylvania	Pennridge High School Stadium	2,000
Clarkstown SC Eagles	2012	Clarkstown, New York	Clarkstown Stadium	1,000
Electric City Shock SC	2009	Scranton, Pennsylvania	Fitzpatrick Field	~1,000
Lehigh Valley United	2009	Allentown, Pennsylvania	Whitehall High School Sports Complex	1,500
GBFC Thunder	2012	Binghamton, New York	Greater Binghamton Sports Complex	~2,000
Hershey FC	2013	Hershey, Pennsylvania	Hershey Park Stadium	15,641
Junior Lone Star FC	2001	Philadelphia, Pennsylvania	Bonner High School Field	~500
Pocono Snow	2008	East Stroudsburg, Pennsylvania	Eiler-Martin Stadium	5,000

Pos	Team	Pld	W	D	L	GF	GA	GD	Pts	Promotion or relegation
1	Greater Binghamton FC (C)	12	9	2	1	24	8	+16	29	Keystone Conference Champion
2	Lehigh Valley United (Q)	12	8	2	2	19	11	+8	26	Northeast Region Playoffs
3	Junior Lone Star FC	12	6	3	3	20	15	+5	21	
4	Buxmont Torch FC	12	5	2	5	21	19	+2	17	
5	Clarkstown SC Eagles	11	4	2	5	17	17	0	14	
6	Hershey FC	12	4	1	7	21	30	−9	13	
7	Pocono Snow	12	3	0	9	14	23	−9	9	
8	Electric City Shock SC	11	1	2	8	13	26	−13	5	

Updated to match(es) played on July 11, 2014. Source: NPSL Standings
Rules for classification: 1) points; 2) goal difference; 3) number of goals scored.
(C) Conference Champions; (Q) Qualified for the phase indicated

==== Mid-Atlantic Conference ====
Team	Founded	Home city	Stadium	Capacity
ASA Charge	2013	Gambrills, Maryland	Arundel High School Stadium	~4,000
Chesterfield United FC	2012	Chesterfield, Virginia	Williams Stadium	10,000
DC United Academy U23	2013	Fairfax County, Virginia	Maryland SoccerPlex	5,200
Legacy 76	2013	Williamsburg, Virginia	James City County Stadium	3,000
RVA Football Club	2012	Richmond, Virginia	Sports Backers Stadium	3,250
Virginia Beach City FC	2013	Virginia Beach, Virginia	Virginia Beach Sportsplex	6,000

Pos	Team	Pld	W	D	L	GF	GA	GD	Pts	Promotion or relegation
1	DC United Academy U23 (C)	10	8	2	0	13	3	+10	26	Mid-Atlantic Conference Champion
2	Virginia Beach City FC (Q)	10	6	3	1	21	8	+13	21	Northeast Region Playoffs
3	RVA Football Club	10	5	0	5	28	20	+8	15	
4	Legacy 76	10	3	2	5	11	19	−8	11	
5	Chesterfield United FC	10	2	1	7	18	27	−9	7	
6	ASA Charge	10	1	2	7	6	20	−14	5	

Updated to match(es) played on July 6, 2014. Source: NPSL Standings
Rules for classification: 1) points; 2) goal difference; 3) number of goals scored.
(C) Conference Champions; (Q) Qualified for the phase indicated

=== South Region ===
The region held its annual general meeting in Philadelphia, Pennsylvania, on January 17 during the NSCAA Annual Convention. In 2014 the South Region was split between four Conferences. Prior to the season, the Mid-Atlantic Conference was split in two with some teams joining the Northeast Region – Mid-Atlantic Conference and some forming the new South Atlantic Conference.

==== South Atlantic Conference ====
Team	Founded	Home city	Stadium	Capacity
Carolina RailHawks U-23's	2007	Cary, North Carolina	WakeMed Soccer Park	10,000
FC Carolina Discoveries	2013	Rock Hill, South Carolina	Manchester Meadows Soccer Complex	750
Gate City FC	2013	Greensboro, North Carolina	Jamieson Stadium	10,000
Myrtle Beach FC	2012	Myrtle Beach, South Carolina	Doug Shaw Memorial Stadium	6,500
Upward Stars	2014	Spartanburg, South Carolina	USC Upstate Stadium	1,000

Pos	Team	Pld	W	D	L	GF	GA	GD	Pts	Promotion or relegation
1	Upward Stars (C)	10	7	0	3	20	13	+7	21	South Atlantic Conference Champion
2	FC Carolina Discoveries	10	4	2	4	19	17	+2	14	
3	Carolina RailHawks U-23's	10	3	4	3	13	15	−2	13	
4	Myrtle Beach FC	10	3	2	5	17	21	−4	11	
5	Gate City FC	10	3	2	5	19	22	−3	11	

Updated to match(es) played on July 9, 2014. Source: NPSL Standings
Rules for classification: 1) points; 2) goal difference; 3) number of goals scored.
(C) Conference Champions

==== Sunshine Conference ====
Due to unforeseen circumstances, Puerto Rico FC did not participate in the 2014 NPSL season.

Team	Founded	Home city	Stadium	Capacity
Cape Coral Hurricanes	2013	Cape Coral, Florida	Cape Coral High School	2,500
Jacksonville United	2011	Jacksonville, Florida	Patton Park	1,000
Miami United F.C.	2013	Miami, Florida	Ted Hendricks Stadium	5,221
Storm FC	2013	Broward County, Florida	Central Broward Regional Park	5,000
Tampa Marauders FC	2013	Tampa, Florida	Naimoli Family Athletic and Intramural Complex	1,450

Pos	Team	Pld	W	D	L	GF	GA	GD	Pts	Promotion or relegation
1	Miami United F.C. (C)	10	7	3	0	22	10	+12	24	Sunshine Conference Champion
2	Jacksonville United (Q)	10	6	2	2	14	7	+7	20	Sunshine Conference Playoff
3	Storm FC (Q)	10	2	4	4	14	16	−2	10	Sunshine Conference Playoff
4	Tampa Marauders FC (Q)	10	2	4	4	15	17	−2	10	Sunshine Conference Playoff
5	Cape Coral Hurricanes	10	0	3	7	9	24	−15	3	

Updated to match(es) played on July 6, 2014. Source: NPSL Standings
Rules for classification: 1) points; 2) goal difference; 3) number of goals scored.
(C) Conference Champions; (Q) Qualified for the phase indicated

==== Southeast Conference ====
In a new format for 2014, the top four teams of the Southeast Conference played for a spot in the South Region playoffs. In past years, the leader at the end of the regular season claimed the title. The host venue for the Southeast Conference Playoffs was selected through a bid process. The winner continued on to the South Region playoffs.

Pensacola started the season but folded on May 29, 2014, negating 4 games already played and cancelling all future games.

Team	Founded	Home city	Stadium	Capacity
Atlanta Silverbacks Reserves	2007	Atlanta, Georgia	Atlanta Silverbacks Park	5,000
Chattanooga FC	2009	Chattanooga, Tennessee	Finley Stadium	20,668
Georgia Revolution	2011	Conyers, Georgia	RYSA Soccerplex	1,000
Knoxville Force	2011	Knoxville, Tennessee	Regal Stadium	3,000
Nashville FC	2013	Nashville, Tennessee	Vanderbilt Soccer Complex	2,400
New Orleans Jesters	2013	New Orleans, Louisiana	Pan American Stadium	5,000
Pensacola City FC	2011	Pensacola, Florida	Ashton Brosnaham Soccer Complex	2,500
Rocket City United	2008	Madison, Alabama	Madison City Schools Stadium	7,000

Pos	Team	Pld	W	D	L	GF	GA	GD	Pts	Promotion or relegation
1	Chattanooga FC (C)	10	7	2	1	28	8	+20	23	Southeast Conference Champion
2	Atlanta Silverbacks Reserves (Q)	10	7	2	1	19	8	+11	23	Southeast Region Playoffs
3	New Orleans Jesters (Q)	10	6	2	2	15	13	+2	20	Southeast Region Playoffs
4	Nashville FC (Q)	12	6	3	3	18	13	+5	21	Southeast Region Playoffs
5	Rocket City United	10	2	2	6	10	24	−14	8	
6	Georgia Revolution	10	1	1	8	10	24	−14	4	
7	Knoxville Force	10	0	2	8	8	25	−17	2	
8	Pensacola City FC (D)	0	0	0	0	0	0	0	0	withdrew midseason on May 29, 2014

Updated to match(es) played on July 5, 2014. Source: NPSL Standings
Rules for classification: 1) points; 2) goal difference; 3) number of goals scored.
(C) Conference Champions; (D) Disqualified; (Q) Qualified for the phase indicated

==== South Central Conference ====
For 2014, the South Central added six new teams, while two teams from 2013 left the Conference. The Conference was divided into North (Oklahoma City, Tulsa, Joplin, and Liverpool) and South (Fort Worth, Dallas, BCS, San Antonio) Divisions, with four teams in each division. Each team played the other three teams twice, once home and once away, and the four teams in the other division once, two home and two away, randomly selected.

The top two teams from each division with the most points advanced to the South Central Conference playoffs, with the first place team in the North playing the second place team in the South and the first place team in the South playing the second place team in the North. The winner of those two games played for the South Central Conference Championship.

A preseason tournament called the Red River Cup between Tulsa, Oklahoma City FC, Liverpool Warriors, and Fort Worth was hosted by Tulsa on May 2 and 3.

Playoff dates for the South Central Conference will be Friday, July 11 with the final on Sunday, July 13. The winner continued on to the South Region playoffs.

Team	Founded	Home city	Stadium	Capacity	Division
BCS Clash	2013	College Station, TX	Allen Academy Stadium	600	South
Corinthians FC of San Antonio	2013	San Antonio, TX	Toyota Field	8,296	South
Dallas City FC	2013	Flower Mound, TX	Mountain View Athletic Complex	2,000	South
Fort Worth Vaqueros FC	2014	Fort Worth, TX	LaGrave Field	4,100	South
Joplin Demize	2014	Joplin, Missouri	Hershewe Stadium		North
Liverpool Warriors	2013	Denton, Texas	TWU Soccer Field		North
Oklahoma City FC	2014	Oklahoma City, OK	University Stars Field	5,000	North
Tulsa Athletics	2013	Tulsa, Oklahoma	Athletics Stadium	10,997	North

North Division

Pos	Team	Pld	W	D	L	GF	GA	GD	Pts	Promotion or relegation
1	Tulsa Athletics (C)	10	9	0	1	46	13	+33	27	South Central Conference Champion
2	Oklahoma City FC (Q)	10	7	1	2	33	13	+20	22	South Central Region Playoffs
3	Joplin Demize	10	3	2	5	15	17	−2	11	
4	Liverpool Warriors	10	3	1	6	29	27	+2	10	

Updated to match(es) played on unknown. Source:
(C) Champions; (Q) Qualified for the phase indicated

South Division

Pos	Team	Pld	W	D	L	GF	GA	GD	Pts	Promotion or relegation
1	Corinthians FC of San Antonio (Q)	10	7	0	3	39	13	+26	21	South Central Region Playoffs
2	Dallas City FC (Q)	10	6	1	3	39	12	+27	19	South Central Region Playoffs
3	Fort Worth Vaqueros FC	10	2	1	7	23	24	−1	7	
4	BCS Clash	10	0	0	10	5	110	−105	0	

Updated to match(es) played on July 6, 2014. Source: NPSL Standings
Rules for classification: 1) points; 2) goal difference; 3) number of goals scored.
(Q) Qualified for the phase indicated

=== Midwest Region ===
The region held its annual general meeting in Madison, Wisconsin, on January 11.

The Great Lakes Conference has been split into two conferences: Great Lakes West (Detroit, Dearborn, Lansing, Cincinnati, Westfield) and Great Lakes East (Erie, Cleveland, Pittsburgh, Buffalo). Teams played a total of 14 games with a single match up against teams from the other Great Lakes Conference.

The Midwest Region Champion was decided by a weekend tournament among the winner of each of the three conferences, as well as one wild card team. The wild card was awarded to the remaining team from among all the conferences with the highest regular season points-per-game. Seeding for the playoff weekend was determined by points-per-game over the regular season.

Two semi-final matches took place on Saturday, July 19 with a final taking place on Sunday, July 20.

- Each conference champion receives a playoff berth. The next best team based on points per game receives a playoff berth as the wildcard team.

Pos	Team	Con	GP	W	D	L	GF	GA	GD	P	PPG	Qualification
1	Quad City Eagles	Cen	10	7	2	1	27	9	+18	23	2.30	Central Conference champion
2	Lansing United	GLW	14	8	4	2	26	13	+13	28	2.00	Great Lakes West Conference champion
3	Minnesota United FC Reserves	Cen	10	6	2	2	23	13	+10	20	2.00	Wildcard champion
4	Detroit City FC	GLW	14	8	3	3	30	17	+13	27	1.93	
5	Indiana Fire NPSL	GLW	14	7	3	4	21	15	+6	24	1.71	
6	Fort Pitt FC Regiment	GLE	14	6	3	5	21	15	+6	21	1.50	Great Lakes East Conference champion
7	Madison 56ers	Cen	10	4	3	3	17	14	+3	15	1.50	
8	Erie Admirals S.C.	GLE	14	6	2	6	20	22	−2	20	1.43	
9	FC Bordo Saint Louis	Cen	10	4	2	4	24	17	+7	14	1.40	
10	AFC Cleveland	GLE	14	5	4	5	22	24	−2	19	1.36	
11	Minnesota Twin Stars	Cen	10	3	3	4	19	15	+4	12	1.20	
12	FC Buffalo	GLE	14	5	1	8	25	27	−2	16	1.14	
13	Michigan Stars FC	GLW	14	4	1	9	17	31	−14	13	0.93	
14	Cincinnati Saints	GLW	14	3	1	10	16	34	−18	7	0.50	
15	Eau Claire Aris FC	Cen	10	0	0	10	7	49	−42	0	0.00	

==== Great Lakes East Conference ====
Team	Founded	Home city	Stadium	Capacity
AFC Cleveland	2012	Cleveland, Ohio	DiSanto Field	3,000
Erie Admirals S.C.	2009	Erie, Pennsylvania	Gannon University Field	2,500
FC Buffalo	2010	Buffalo, New York	Demske Sports Complex	1,200
Fort Pitt FC Regiment	2013	Pittsburgh, PA	Birko Memorial Stadium	5,000

Pos	Team	Pld	W	D	L	GF	GA	GD	Pts	Promotion or relegation
1	Fort Pitt FC Regiment (C)	14	6	3	5	21	15	+6	21	Great Lakes East Conference Champion
2	Erie Admirals S.C.	14	6	2	6	20	22	−2	20	
3	AFC Cleveland	14	5	4	5	22	24	−2	19	
4	FC Buffalo	14	5	1	8	25	27	−2	16	

Updated to match(es) played on July 13, 2014. Source: NPSL Standings
Rules for classification: 1) points; 2) goal difference; 3) number of goals scored.
(C) Conference Champions

==== Great Lakes West Conference ====
Team	Founded	Home city	Stadium	Capacity
Cincinnati Saints	2014	Cincinnati, Ohio	Withrow High School Stadium	8,000
Detroit City FC	2012	Detroit, Michigan	Cass Technical High School Stadium	3,000
Indiana Fire NPSL	2014	Westfield, Indiana	Westfield High School	
Lansing United	2013	Lansing, Michigan	Archer Stadium	~700
Michigan Stars FC	2012	Dearborn Heights, Michigan	Star International Academy	800

Pos	Team	Pld	W	D	L	GF	GA	GD	Pts	Promotion or relegation
1	Lansing United (C)	14	8	4	2	26	13	+13	28	Great Lakes West Conference Champion
2	Detroit City FC	14	8	3	3	30	17	+13	27	
3	Indiana Fire NPSL	14	7	3	4	21	15	+6	24	
4	Michigan Stars FC	14	4	1	9	17	31	−14	13	
5	Cincinnati Saints	14	3	1	10	16	34	−18	7	

Updated to match(es) played on July 13, 2014. Source: NPSL Standings
Rules for classification: 1) points; 2) goal difference; 3) number of goals scored.
(C) Conference Champions

==== Central Conference ====
Team	Founded	Home city	Stadium	Capacity
Eau Claire Aris FC	2009	La Crosse, Wisconsin	Viterbo Athletic Complex	N/A
FC Bordo Saint Louis	2011	St. Louis, Missouri	St Louis University High School Stadium	1100
Madison 56ers	2005	Madison, Wisconsin	Breese Stevens Field	5,000
Minnesota TwinStars FC	2005	Minneapolis, Minnesota	Edor Nelson Field	~1,000
Minnesota United FC Reserves	2013	Woodbury, Minnesota	Bielenberg Sports Complex	
Quad City Eagles	2011	Moline, Illinois	Spartan Stadium	5,000

Pos	Team	Pld	W	D	L	GF	GA	GD	Pts	Promotion or relegation
1	Quad City Eagles (C)	10	7	2	1	27	9	+18	23	Central Conference Champion
2	Minnesota United FC Reserves (Q)	10	6	2	2	23	13	+10	20	Midwest Region Playoffs
3	Madison 56ers	10	4	3	3	17	14	+3	15	
4	FC Bordo Saint Louis	10	4	2	4	24	17	+7	14	
5	Minnesota Twin Stars	10	3	3	4	19	15	+4	12	
6	Eau Claire Aris FC	10	0	0	10	7	49	−42	0	

Updated to match(es) played on July 12, 2014. Source: NPSL Standings
Rules for classification: 1) points; 2) goal difference; 3) number of goals scored.
(C) Conference Champions; (Q) Qualified for the phase indicated

=== West Region ===
For 2014, a new Northwest Conference was added. This brought the number of Conferences in the West Region to three. The region held its annual general meeting in San Diego, California, on January 12.

==== Southwest Conference ====
Team	Founded	Home city	Stadium	Capacity
Del Rey City SC	2009	Marina del Rey, California	Santa Monica High School; Leuzinger High School	500; 2,000
FC Force	2014	Holtville, California	Southwest High School; Holtville High School; Calexico High School	
FC Hasental	2005	Agoura Hills, California	Oak Park High School Stadium	5,000
FC Santa Clarita	2006	Santa Clarita, California	Canyon High School Stadium	5,000
San Diego Flash	1998	San Diego, California	Del Norte High School Stadium	5,000
Temecula FC	2013	Temecula, California	Great Oak High School Stadium	3,500

Pos	Team	Pld	W	D	L	GF	GA	GD	Pts	Promotion or relegation
1	FC Force (C)	15	13	1	1	48	23	+25	40	Southwest Conference Champion
2	FC Hasental (Q)	15	10	1	4	47	21	+26	31	West Region Playoffs
3	San Diego Flash (Q)	15	8	4	3	55	25	+30	28	West Region Playoffs
4	Temecula FC	15	5	4	6	48	40	+8	19	
5	Santa Clarita	15	3	1	11	21	60	−39	10	
6	Del Rey City SC	15	0	1	14	14	64	−50	1	

Updated to match(es) played on July 5, 2014. Source: NPSL Standings
Rules for classification: 1) points; 2) goal difference; 3) number of goals scored.
(C) Champions; (Q) Qualified for the phase indicated

==== Golden Gate Conference ====
Team	Founded	Home city	Stadium	Capacity
CD Aguiluchos USA	2012	Oakland, California	Raimondi Park	~2,000
Real San Jose	2006	San Jose, California	Yerba Buena High School	~1,000
Sacramento Gold	2009	West Sacramento, California	River City High School	3,200
San Francisco Stompers FC	2012	San Francisco, California	Lowell High School Stadium; Kezar Stadium; Boxer Stadium	3,500
Sonoma County Sol	2004	Santa Rosa, California	Cougar Stadium	2,000

Pos	Team	Pld	W	D	L	GF	GA	GD	Pts	Promotion or relegation
1	Sacramento Gold (C)	12	8	1	3	36	10	+26	25	Golden Gate Conference Champion
2	Sonoma County Sol (Q)	12	7	3	2	23	15	+8	24	West Region Playoffs
3	CD Aguiluchos USA	12	5	2	5	18	17	+1	17	
4	Real San Jose	12	3	2	7	13	27	−14	11	
5	San Francisco Stompers FC	12	2	2	8	11	32	−21	8	

Updated to match(es) played on June 28, 2014. Source: NPSL Standings
Rules for classification: 1) points; 2) goal difference; 3) number of goals scored.
(C) Conference Champions; (Q) Qualified for the phase indicated

==== Northwest Conference ====
Team	Founded	Home city	Stadium	Capacity
Gorge FC	2014	Hood River, Oregon	Hood River Valley High School Stadium	
Inter United FC	2008	Tukwila, Washington	Neudorf Memorial Stadium	3,000
Seattle Sporting FC	2013	Bothell, Washington	Pop Keeney Stadium	4,500
Spartans Futbol Club	2012	Portland, Oregon	Concordia Stadium	1,700

Pos	Team	Pld	W	D	L	GF	GA	GD	Pts	Promotion or relegation
1	Spartans Futbol Club (C)	12	10	2	0	41	7	+34	32	Northwest Conference Champion
2	Seattle Sporting FC	12	5	4	3	31	23	+8	19	
3	Inter United FC	12	2	3	7	18	38	−20	9	
4	Gorge FC	12	1	3	8	20	42	−22	6	

Updated to match(es) played on June 29, 2014. Source: NPSL Standings
Rules for classification: 1) points; 2) goal difference; 3) number of goals scored.
(C) Conference Champions

== Conference playoffs ==
=== Sunshine Conference Playoff ===
The Sunshine Conference played a conference playoff from July 10-12th with the top four teams in the conference participating. The entire playoffs was held at one location.

Conference Semifinals (July 10)
1	Miami United F.C.	2
4	Storm FC	1
3	Jacksonville United FC	0
2	Tampa Marauders	2

Conference Championship (July 12)
1	Miami United F.C.	3
2	Tampa Marauders	2

Sunshine Conference Playoffs
July 10, 2014
7:00 PM EDT
Semifinals

Jacksonville United FC	0–2	Tampa Marauders
	Report

Patton Park
Jacksonville, Florida
Attendance: 931
July 10, 2014
7:00 PM EDT
Semifinals

Miami United F.C.	2–1	Storm FC
	Report

Ted Hendricks Stadium
Hialeah, Florida

July 12, 2014
7:00 PM EDT
Final

Miami United F.C.	3–2	Tampa Marauders
	Report

Ted Hendricks Stadium
Hialeah, Florida

=== Southeast Conference Playoff ===
In a new format for 2014, the top four teams of the Southeast Conference played for a spot in the South Region playoffs. The host venue for the Southeast Conference Playoffs was Finley Stadium in Chattanooga. The winner continued on to the South Region playoffs.

Conference Semifinals (July 11)
1	Chattanooga FC	6
4	Nashville FC	1
3	New Orleans Jesters	4
2	Silverbacks Reserves	1

Conference Championship (July 12)
1	Chattanooga FC	4
3	New Orleans Jesters	0

Southeast Conference Playoffs
July 11, 2014
Semifinals

Silverbacks Reserves	1–4	New Orleans Jesters

Finley Stadium
Chattanooga, Tennessee
July 11, 2014
8:00 PM EDT
Semifinals

Chattanooga FC	6–1	Nashville FC
Carrier 14'; McCabe 21'; Trude 40'; Reyneke 55'; Smedt 66'; Davidson 90+'	Report	Tikhomiro 83'

Finley Stadium
Chattanooga, Tennessee
Attendance: 3,101

July 12, 2014
7:30 PM EDT
Final

Chattanooga FC	4–0	New Orleans Jesters
Winter 13' (red card) 60'; Reyneke 26'; De Smedt 69'; Trude 79'	Report

Finley Stadium
Chattanooga, Tennessee
Attendance: 2,802

=== South Central Conference Playoff ===
The top two teams from each division with the most points advanced to the South Central Conference playoffs, with the first place team in the North playing the second place team in the South and the first place team in the South playing the second place team in the North. The winner of those two games played for the South Central Conference Championship. The winner continued on to the South Region playoffs.

Conference Semifinals (July 12)
N1	Tulsa Athletics	6
S2	Dallas City FC	0
N2	Oklahoma City FC	2(4)
S1	Corinthians FC	2(5)

Conference Championship (July 13)
N1	Tulsa Athletics	4
S1	Corinthians FC	2

South Central Conference Playoffs
July 12, 2014
4:30 PM CDT
Semifinals

San Antonio Corinthians	2–2 (a.e.t.)	Oklahoma City FC
Penalties
	5–4

Athletics Stadium
Tulsa, Oklahoma
July 12, 2014
7:30 PM CDT
Semifinals

Tulsa Athletics	6–0	Dallas City FC

Athletics Stadium
Tulsa, Oklahoma

July 13, 2014
7:30 PM CDT
Final

Tulsa Athletics	4–2	San Antonio Corinthians
Masterson; Leung; Barret (pen.); Thomas		Goal

Athletics Stadium
Tulsa, Oklahoma

== Regional and national playoffs ==
Regional First Round; July 5–12
4	Brooklyn Italians	2
5	Lehigh Valley United	1
3	GBFC Thunder	4
6	Virginia Beach City FC	0
4	FC Hasental	0
5	Sonoma County Sol	2
3	Sacramento Gold	2
6	San Diego Flash	1

Regional semifinals
1	New York Red Bulls U-23	4
4	Brooklyn Italians	3
3	GBFC Thunder	1
2	D.C. United U-23	0
1	Quad City Eagles	0
4	Fort Pitt Regiment	1
3	MN United Reserves	1
2	Lansing United	4
1	Miami United F.C.	0
4	Chattanooga FC	2
3	Upward Stars	2
2	Tulsa Athletics	4
1	Spartans Futbol Club	1
5	Sonoma County Sol	3
3	Sacramento Gold	5
2	FC Force	2

Regional Finals
1	New York Red Bulls U-23	4
3	GBFC Thunder	0
4	Fort Pitt Regiment	1
2	Lansing United (aet)	2
4	Chattanooga FC	2
2	Tulsa Athletics	0
6	Sonoma County Sol	0
3	Sacramento Gold	2

National semifinals
NE	New York Red Bulls U-23	2
MW	Lansing United	0
S	Chattanooga FC	4
W	Sacramento Gold	1

NPSL Championship Game
NE	New York Red Bulls U-23	3
S	Chattanooga FC	1

*Conference Champions
Bold Winner
italics Team with home-field advantage

=== Regional First Round ===
West Region First Round
July 5, 2014
7:00 PM PDT
First Round

Sacramento Gold	2–1	San Diego Flash
	Report

River City High School
West Sacramento, California
July 6, 2014
6:30 PM PDT
First Round

FC Hasental	0–2	Sonoma County Sol
	Report	Frame; Jones

Oak Park High School
Oak Park, California
Northeast Region First Round
July 12, 2014
5:00 PM EDT
First Round

GBFC Thunder	1–0 (a.e.t.)	Virginia Beach City FC
Varkatzas 114'	Report

Greater Binghamton Sports Complex
Binghamton, New York
July 12, 2014
5:00 PM EDT
First Round

Brooklyn Italians	2–1	Lehigh Valley United
	Report

John Dewey High School
Brooklyn, New York

=== Regional Semifinals ===
West Region Semifinals
July 12, 2014
7:00 PM PDT
Semifinals

FC Force	2–5	Sacramento Gold
	Report

Linfield Christian School
Temecula, California
July 13, 2014
3:00 PM PDT
Semifinals

Spartans Futbol Club	1–3	Sonoma County Sol
	Report

Evergreen High School
Vancouver, Washington
Northeast Region Semifinals
July 16, 2014
7:00 PM EDT
Semifinals

New York Red Bulls U-23	4–3	Brooklyn Italians
Innocenzi 4', 50'; Sheridan 45'; Castellanos 75'	Report	26'; 28'

Red Bull Training Facility Field 1
Whippany, New Jersey
July 16, 2014
7:30 PM EDT
Semifinals

D.C. United U-23	0–1	GBFC Thunder
	Report	Jelovac 52'

Maryland Soccerplex
Boyds, Maryland
South Region Semifinals
July 18, 2014
6:00 PM EDT
Semifinals

Chattanooga FC	2–0	Miami United FC
Trude 32'; Davidson	Report	Texiera (red card) 61'

Finley Stadium
Chattanooga, Tennessee
Attendance: 2,011
July 18, 2014
7:30 PM EDT
Semifinals

Tulsa Athletics	4–2 (a.e.t.)	Upward Stars
	Report

Finley Stadium
Chattanooga, Tennessee
Midwest Region Semifinals
July 19, 2014
4:00 PM EDT
Semifinals

Quad City Eagles	0–1	Fort Pitt Regiment

Archer Stadium
East Lansing, Michigan
July 19, 2014
6:30 PM EDT
Semifinals

Lansing United	4–1	MN United Reserves
Archibald 9'; Lamb 14'; Brown 45+'; Pasher 83'		Pridham 53'

Archer Stadium
East Lansing, Michigan

=== Regional Finals ===
Northeast Region Final
July 19, 2014
7:00 PM EDT
Final

New York Red Bulls U-23	4–0	GBFC Thunder
Manosalvas 21'; Bedoya 51'; Sheridan 75'; Anderson 86'	Report

Red Bull Training Facility Field 1
Whippany, New Jersey
South Region Final
July 19, 2014
7:30 PM EDT
Final

Chattanooga FC	2–0	Tulsa Athletic
Trude 4'; Winter 79'	Report

Finley Stadium
Chattanooga, Tennessee
Attendance: 2,827
West Region Final
July 19, 2014
8:00 PM PDT
Final

Sacramento Gold	2–0	Sonoma County Sol
	Report

River City High School
West Sacramento, California
Midwest Region Final
July 20, 2014
5:00 PM EDT
Final

Lansing United	2–1 (a.e.t.)	Fort Pitt Regiment
Rumbold 3'; Mateo 111'	Report	Brett 35'

Archer Stadium
East Lansing, Michigan

=== National Semifinals ===
July 26, 2014
7:30 PM EDT
Semifinals

Chattanooga FC	4–1	Sacramento Gold
Winter 26'; Ferraz; Trude; Moore	Report	Jones

Finley Stadium
Chattanooga, Tennessee
Attendance: 8,878
July 27, 2014
7:00 PM EDT
Semifinals

New York Red Bulls U-23	2–0	Lansing United
Sheridan; Innocenzi 78'	Report

Red Bull Training Facility Field 1
Whippany, New Jersey

=== NPSL Championship Game ===
August 2, 2014
9:30 PM EDT

New York Red Bulls U-23	3 – 1	Chattanooga FC
Thomsen 23'; Innocenzi (yellow card) 37'; Farrell 84'; Adjei 90'	Report	Winter 15'; Dunstan (yellow card) 32'

Red Bull Arena
Harrison, New Jersey
Attendance: 1,298
Referee: Mark Gonak
