= 2014 U.S. Open Cup qualification =

Soccer tournament

The 2014 Lamar Hunt U.S. Open Cup tournament proper features teams from all five tiers of men's soccer of the American Soccer Pyramid.

The 2014 tournament added another round to include the largest field of teams (80) in tournament history. All American-based teams from the top three tiers, Major League Soccer, the North American Soccer League, and USL Pro earned berths into the fourth, third, and second rounds of the tournament, respectively.

For the fourth and fifth tiers of the pyramid, a series of qualification and state tournaments are held to determine the berths into the tournament. These teams will complete the 80-team field in the U.S. Open Cup.

== National Premier Soccer League ==
In addition to the two teams from the West Region (CD Aguiluchos USA & San Diego Flash), the other regions qualifiers are Brooklyn Italians, Greater Binghamton Thunder, RVA FC, Jacksonville United, Chattanooga FC, FC Lehigh Valley United Sonic, Tulsa Athletics, Detroit City FC, New York Red Bulls U-23s

=== West Region - Southwest Conference qualifying tournament ===
All six teams of the 2014 Southwest Conference competed in the qualifying tournament with FC Hasental and the San Diego Flash receiving first round byes.

March 1
Temecula FC	2
FC Force	5
FC Santa Clarita	1
Del Rey City SC	0

March 9
San Diego Flash	3
FC Force	0
FC Hasental	6
FC Santa Clarita	1

March 15
San Diego Flash	2
FC Hasental	1

==== Matches ====
March 1, 2014 Match 1	Temecula FC	2–5	FC Force	Temecula, California
20:30 PST UTC−8		Report

March 1, 2014 Match 2	FC Santa Clarita	1–0	Del Rey City SC	Malibu, California
19:00 PST UTC−8		Report		Stadium: Malibu High School Stadium

March 8, 2014 Match 3	FC Hasental	6–1	FC Santa Clarita	Oak Park, California
19:00 PDT UTC−7				Stadium: Oak Park High School Stadium

March 9, 2014 Match 4	San Diego Flash	3–0	FC Force	San Diego, California
18:30 PDT UTC−7				Stadium: Mira Mesa High School Stadium

March 15, 2014 Match 5	San Diego Flash	2–1	FC Hasental	San Diego, California
TBD PDT UTC−7				Stadium: Mira Mesa High School Stadium

=== West Region - Golden Gate Conference qualifying tournament ===
All five teams of the 2014 Golden Gate Conference will compete in the qualifying tournament with Sonoma County Sol and Sacramento Gold starting off with a play-in game.

February 22
Sonoma County Sol	2
Sacramento Gold	1

March 1
Sonoma County Sol	2
Real San Jose	0
SF Stompers FC	0
CD Aguiluchos USA	1

March 8
Sonoma County Sol	1(3)
CD Aguiluchos USA	1(4)

==== Matches ====
February 22, 2014 Match 1	Sonoma County Sol	2–1	Sacramento Gold	Rohnert Park, California
19:00 PST UTC−8	Eric Larson 14'; Tyler Hurst 48'	Report; Report	Jose Martinez 24'	Stadium: Rancho Cotate High School Stadium

March 1, 2014 Match 2	San Francisco Stompers FC	0–1	CD Aguiluchos USA	San Francisco, California
15:00 PST UTC−8		Report	Nestor Palacios 89'	Stadium: Lowell High School Stadium

March 1, 2014 Match 3	Sonoma County Sol	2–0	Real San Jose	Rohnert Park, California
19:00 PST UTC−8		Report		Stadium: Rancho Cotate High School Stadium

March 8, 2014 Match 4	Sonoma County Sol	1–1 (a.e.t.) (3–4 p)	CD Aguiluchos USA	Rohnert Park, California
19:00 PST UTC−8				Stadium: Rancho Cotate High School Stadium

=== West Region - Northwest Conference qualifying tournament ===
All four teams of the new 2014 Northwest Conference will compete in the qualifying tournament.

March 9
SO Samba FC	0
Spartans Futbol Club	6
Oregon; Washington
Inter United FC	0
Seattle Sporting FC	1

March 13
Spartans Futbol Club	3
Seattle Sporting FC	0

==== Matches ====
March 8, 2014 Match 1	SO Samba FC	0–6	Spartans Futbol Club	Portland, Oregon
19:00 PDT UTC−7				Stadium: Buckman Field

March 9, 2014 Match 2	Inter United FC	0–1	Seattle Sporting FC	Tukwila, Washington
17:00 PDT UTC−7				Stadium: Foster High School Stadium

March 13, 2014 Match 3	Spartans Futbol Club	3–0	Seattle Sporting FC	Portland, Oregon
19:30 PDT UTC−7				Stadium: Buckman Field

=== West Region - Golden Gate/Northwest Playoff Game ===
The champions of the Golden Gate and Northwest Conference Qualifying Tournaments will play each other to determine the qualifier for the US Open Cup.

March 15
CD Aguiluchos USA	2
Spartans Futbol Club	1

==== Matches ====
March 16, 2014 Playoff	CD Aguiluchos USA	2–1	Spartans Futbol Club	Oakland, California
				Stadium: Raimondi Park

== USASA ==
Based on the USASA retaining their eight qualification spots, although this has yet to be confirmed by US Soccer.

The USASA adopted new qualification standards for the 2014 tournament citing earlier qualifying deadlines by USSF. They will now use the results from the previous calendar years tournaments to determine regional qualifiers. Region I has already adopted that their qualifiers will be the regional champion of both the USASA National Cup and the USASA US Amateur Cup. Some regions have adopted different methods in this transition year.

Region	Qualification method	Qualified team
I	Amateur Cup Regional Champion	(New York (state)) NY Greek-American Atlas
I	Open Cup Regional Champion	(New Jersey) Icon FC
II	2013 Qualifying Tournament Finalist	(Iowa) Des Moines Menace
II	2013 Qualifying Tournament Finalist	(Illinois) Schwaben AC
III	2013 Open Cup Regional Runner-up	(Florida) Red Force FC
III	2013 Open Cup Regional Champion	(Texas) NTX Rayados
IV	2013 Fall Play-in Game Winner	(California) Cal FC
IV	2013 Open Cup Regional Champion	(California) PSA Elite
WC	2013 Region I Open Cup runner-up	(Massachusetts) Mass Premier Soccer
WC	2013 Amateur Cup National Champion	(Illinois) RWB Adria

== US Club Soccer ==
NorCal Premier League will host a tournament that is open to any team that is a registered US soccer team. Chivas USA U23s & Corinthians USA from the SoCal Premier League have already signed up. The winner of this tournament will play a Play-In match against No. 6 seed Juventus SC Black 93.

Quarterfinals
Play-In Winner
3	Vacaville United Elite
5	San Ramon Soccer Azuri
4	Oakland Ambassadors FC

Semifinals
1	DV8 Defenders
2	Pacific Soccer Academy

Finals

== USSSA ==
Based on keeping one qualifying spot from the 2013 tournament, the winner will be the qualifier. Due to field conditions and rescheduling issues, all games except the final will be shortened 50-minute games. The final will still be the standard 90 minutes.

Group A
Team	Pld	W	D	L	GF	GA	GD	Pts
Colorado Rovers S.C.	3	2	1	0	3	0	+3	7
CO Sporting Premier	3	2	0	1	9	1	+8	6
Boulevard	3	1	1	1	5	5	0	4
Comets Express	3	0	0	3	0	11	−11	0

Group B
Team	Pld	W	D	L	GF	GA	GD	Pts
KC Athletics	3	2	1	0	13	0	+13	7
FC Denver	3	1	2	0	3	0	+3	5
Aztecs Mojos	3	1	1	1	7	4	+3	4
Performance Soccer	3	0	0	3	0	19	−19	0

=== Group play ===
March 14, 2014 Match 1	Colorado Rovers	2–0	Comets Express	Overland Park, Kansas
7:00 PM CDT UTC−5				Stadium: Field 1, Overland Park Soccer Complex

March 14, 2014 Match 2	Boulevard	0–5	CO Sporting Premier	Overland Park, Kansas
7:00 PM CDT UTC−5				Stadium: Field 2, Overland Park Soccer Complex

March 14, 2014 Match 3	FC Denver	3–0	Performance Soccer	Overland Park, Kansas
8:15 PM CDT UTC−5				Stadium: Field 1, Overland Park Soccer Complex

March 14, 2014 Match 4	KC Athletics	4–0	Azteca Mojos	Overland Park, Kansas
8:15 PM CDT UTC−5				Stadium: Field 2, Overland Park Soccer Complex

March 15, 2014 Match 5	Boulevard	0–0	Colorado Rovers	Overland Park, Kansas
10:00 AM CDT UTC−5				Stadium: Field 1, Overland Park Soccer Complex

March 15, 2014 Match 6	CO Sporting Premier	4–0	Comets Express	Overland Park, Kansas
10:00 AM CDT UTC−5				Stadium: Field 2, Overland Park Soccer Complex

March 15, 2014 Match 7	Performance Soccer	0–9	KC Athletics	Overland Park, Kansas
11:15 AM CDT UTC−5				Stadium: Field 1, Overland Park Soccer Complex

March 14, 2014 Match 8	Azteca Mojos	0–0	FC Denver	Overland Park, Kansas
11:15 AM CDT UTC−5				Stadium: Field 2, Overland Park Soccer Complex

March 15, 2014 Match 9	Colorado Rovers	1–0	CO Sporting Premier	Overland Park, Kansas
2:00 PM CDT UTC−5				Stadium: Field 1, Overland Park Soccer Complex

March 15, 2014 Match 10	Comets Express	0–5	Boulevard	Overland Park, Kansas
2:00 PM CDT UTC−5				Stadium: Field 2, Overland Park Soccer Complex

March 15, 2014 Match 11	FC Denver	0–0	KC Athletics	Overland Park, Kansas
3:15 PM CDT UTC−5				Stadium: Field 1, Overland Park Soccer Complex

March 15, 2014 Match 12	Performance Soccer	0–7	Aztecs Mojos	Overland Park, Kansas
3:15 PM CDT UTC−5				Stadium: Field 2, Overland Park Soccer Complex

=== Championship stage ===
March 16, 2014 Match 13	Colorado Rovers	1–0	FC Denver	Overland Park, Kansas
9:30 AM CDT UTC−5				Stadium: Field 1, Overland Park Soccer Complex

March 16, 2014 Match 14	KC Athletics	6–0	CO Sporting Premier	Overland Park, Kansas
9:30 AM CDT UTC−5				Stadium: Field 2, Overland Park Soccer Complex

March 16, 2014 Match 15	KC Athletics	0–1 (a.e.t.)	Colorado Rovers	Overland Park, Kansas
12:00 PM CDT UTC−5				Stadium: Field 1, Overland Park Soccer Complex
