= 2012 NPSL season =

National Premier Soccer League
- Season: 2012
- Champions: FC Sonic (1st Title)
- Regular Season Champions: San Diego Flash (1st Title)
- Matches: 289
- Goals: 1,107 (3.83 per match)
- Biggest home win: 9–0 Sacramento Gold over San Francisco Stompers
- Biggest away win: 7–0 Morris County Colonials over Pocono Snow

The 2012 NPSL season was the 10th season of the National Premier Soccer League.

== Format ==
=== Summary of Regions and Conferences ===
Locations of NPSL clubs for 2012. Blue = Northeast Region clubs, Orange = South Region clubs, Green = Midwest Region clubs, Red = West Region clubs

== Changes From 2011 ==
=== Name Changes/Rebrands ===
The Santa Ana Winds' NPSL side is now affiliated with the Fullerton Rangers. The Lancaster Rattlers have moved to become FC Santa Clarita.

=== New Franchises ===
13 franchises were announced as joining the league this year:

| Team name | Metro area | Location | Previous affiliation |
|---|---|---|---|
| Junior Lone Star FC | Philadelphia | Philadelphia, PA | Expansion Team |
| Phoenix Monsoon | Phoenix, AZ | San Tan Valley, Arizona | Expansion Team |
| Detroit City FC | Detroit, MI | Detroit, Michigan | Expansion Team |
| Mississippi Storm | Gulfport-Biloxi, MS | Biloxi, Mississippi | Expansion Team |
| F.C. New York | New York City | Queens, New York | USL Professional Division |
| Greater Binghamton FC | Binghamton, NY | Binghamton, NY | Expansion Team |
| AFC Cleveland | Cleveland, OH | Parma, OH | Expansion Team |
| Rhode Island Reds F.C. | Providence, RI | Cranston, RI | Expansion Team |
| Seacoast United Mariners | Rockingham County, NH | Portsmouth, NH | Expansion Team |
| North Coast Tsunami | North Coast, CA | Eureka, CA | Expansion Team |
| Jersey City Eagles | Jersey City, NJ | Jersey City, NJ | Expansion Team |
| San Francisco Stompers FC | San Francisco, CA | San Francisco, CA | Expansion Team |
| Myrtle Beach FC | Myrtle Beach, SC | Myrtle Beach, SC | Expansion Team |

=== Folding ===
Chicago Fire NPSL IL
Hollywood United Hitmen CA
Minnesota Kings MN
New Jersey Blaze NJ

=== On Hiatus ===
FC Reading Revolution PA

== Standings ==
As of 7/22/12
Purple indicates division title clinched
Green indicates playoff berth clinched

=== Northeast Division – Atlantic Conference ===
| Place | Team | Pld. | W | T | L | GF | GA | GD | Points |
|---|---|---|---|---|---|---|---|---|---|
| 1 | New York Red Bulls NPSL | 14 | 11 | 0 | 3 | 35 | 12 | +23 | 33 |
| 2 | Brooklyn Italians | 14 | 10 | 1 | 3 | 31 | 15 | +16 | 31 |
| 3 | New York Athletic Club | 12 | 6 | 3 | 3 | 28 | 17 | +11 | 21 |
| 4 | Rhode Island Reds | 13 | 5 | 4 | 4 | 18 | 23 | −5 | 19 |
| 5 | Mass United | 13 | 4 | 1 | 8 | 23 | 28 | −5 | 13 |
| 6 | Seacoast United Phantoms | 14 | 3 | 4 | 7 | 17 | 30 | −13 | 13 |
| 7 | Seacoast United Mariners | 14 | 2 | 5 | 7 | 17 | 26 | −9 | 11 |
| 8 | FC New York | 14 | 2 | 4 | 8 | 10 | 28 | −18 | 10 |

=== Northeast Division – Keystone Conference ===
| Place | Team | Pld. | W | T | L | GF | GA | GD | Points |
|---|---|---|---|---|---|---|---|---|---|
| 1 | FC Sonic | 12 | 10 | 1 | 1 | 22 | 3 | +19 | 31 |
| 2 | Morris County Colonials | 11 | 7 | 3 | 1 | 34 | 15 | +19 | 24 |
| 3 | Jersey City Eagles FC | 11 | 6 | 2 | 3 | 21 | 16 | +5 | 20 |
| 4 | AC Crusaders | 10 | 4 | 0 | 6 | 18 | 27 | −9 | 12 |
| 5 | Junior Lone Star FC | 12 | 4 | 0 | 8 | 19 | 30 | −11 | 12 |
| 6 | Pocono Snow | 12 | 2 | 3 | 7 | 8 | 24 | −16 | 9 |
| 7 | Buxmont Torch FC | 12 | 1 | 3 | 8 | 20 | 27 | −7 | 6 |

=== South-Southeast Conference-East ===
| Place | Team | Pld. | W | T | L | GF | GA | GD | Points |
|---|---|---|---|---|---|---|---|---|---|
| 1 | Georgia Revolution | 10 | 7 | 1 | 2 | 30 | 16 | +14 | 22 |
| 2 | Atlanta Silverbacks Reserves | 10 | 5 | 2 | 3 | 20 | 13 | +7 | 17 |
| 3 | Myrtle Beach FC | 10 | 4 | 0 | 6 | 11 | 25 | −14 | 12 |
| 4 | Jacksonville United | 10 | 3 | 2 | 5 | 21 | 23 | −2 | 11 |

=== South-Southeast Conference-West ===
| Place | Team | Pld. | W | T | L | GF | GA | GD | Points |
|---|---|---|---|---|---|---|---|---|---|
| 1 | Chattanooga FC | 10 | 6 | 3 | 1 | 23 | 8 | +15 | 21 |
| 2 | Knoxville Force | 10 | 6 | 0 | 4 | 14 | 13 | +1 | 18 |
| 3 | Rocket City United | 10 | 3 | 2 | 5 | 13 | 12 | +1 | 11 |
| 4 | Mississippi Storm | 10 | 1 | 0 | 9 | 11 | 33 | −22 | 3 |

=== South-South Central Conference ===
| Place | Team | Pld. | W | T | L | GF | GA | GD | Points |
|---|---|---|---|---|---|---|---|---|---|
| 1 | FC New Orleans | 2 | 1 | 1 | 0 | 7 | 4 | 3 | 4 |
| 2 | Galveston Pirate SC | 4 | 1 | 1 | 2 | 7 | 14 | −7 | 4 |
| 3 | Texas South Devils | 2 | 1 | 0 | 1 | 6 | 3 | 3 | 3 |

(Note: The South-South Central Conference did not play any games after June 16, 2012.)

=== South-South Central Conference (Additional teams) ===
| Place | Team | Pld. | W | T | L | GF | GA | GD | Points |
|---|---|---|---|---|---|---|---|---|---|
| 1 | Galveston Pirate SC | 9 | 5 | 1 | 3 | 21 | 18 | 3 | 16 |
| 2 | FC New Orleans | 2 | 1 | 1 | 0 | 7 | 4 | 3 | 4 |
| 3 | Texas South Devils | 2 | 1 | 0 | 1 | 7 | 2 | 5 | 3 |
| 4 | America USA | 2 | 1 | 0 | 1 | 5 | 4 | 1 | 3 |
| 5 | Regals SCA | 1 | 0 | 0 | 1 | 1 | 3 | −2 | 0 |
| 5 | Club America Academy | 2 | 0 | 0 | 2 | 0 | 6 | −6 | 0 |
| 5 | FC Tulsa | 0 | 0 | 0 | 0 | 0 | 0 | 0 | 0 |

(Note: This South-South Central Conference table includes teams from the 2012 South-South Central Conference schedule. The conference did not play any games after June 30, 2012.)

=== Midwest-Central Conference ===
| Place | Team | Pld. | W | T | L | GF | GA | GD | Points |
|---|---|---|---|---|---|---|---|---|---|
| 1 | Madison 56ers | 12 | 9 | 0 | 3 | 33 | 13 | +20 | 27 |
| 2 | Milwaukee Bavarians | 12 | 8 | 0 | 4 | 39 | 29 | +10 | 24 |
| 3 | Quad City Eagles | 12 | 5 | 3 | 4 | 23 | 21 | +2 | 18 |
| 4 | Minnesota TwinStars FC | 12 | 5 | 2 | 5 | 34 | 29 | +5 | 17 |
| 5 | Eau Claire Aris FC | 12 | 0 | 1 | 11 | 18 | 55 | −37 | 1 |

=== Midwest-Great Lakes Conference ===
| Place | Team | Pld. | W | T | L | GF | GA | GD | Points |
|---|---|---|---|---|---|---|---|---|---|
| 1 | Erie Admirals | 12 | 6 | 5 | 1 | 28 | 17 | +11 | 23 |
| 2 | Detroit City FC | 12 | 5 | 5 | 2 | 26 | 10 | +16 | 20 |
| 3 | AFC Cleveland | 12 | 4 | 7 | 1 | 22 | 15 | +7 | 19 |
| 4 | Greater Binghamton FC | 12 | 2 | 3 | 7 | 14 | 29 | −15 | 9 |
| 5 | FC Buffalo | 12 | 1 | 4 | 7 | 11 | 30 | −19 | 7 |

=== West Division – Northern Conference ===
| Place | Team | Pld. | W | T | L | GF | GA | GD | Points |
|---|---|---|---|---|---|---|---|---|---|
| 1 | Bay Area Ambassadors | 14 | 9 | 1 | 4 | 34 | 17 | +17 | 28 |
| 2 | Sonoma County Sol | 14 | 6 | 4 | 4 | 27 | 21 | +6 | 22 |
| 3 | Sacramento Gold | 14 | 7 | 1 | 6 | 36 | 31 | +5 | 22 |
| 4 | Real San Jose | 14 | 5 | 4 | 5 | 29 | 20 | +9 | 19 |
| 5 | San Francisco Stompers | 13 | 3 | 3 | 7 | 12 | 42 | −30 | 12 |
| 6 | North Coast Tsunami | 13 | 3 | 1 | 9 | 11 | 30 | −19 | 10 |

=== West Division – Southern Conference ===
| Place | Team | Pld. | W | T | L | GF | GA | GD | Points |
|---|---|---|---|---|---|---|---|---|---|
| 1 | San Diego Flash | 14 | 11 | 2 | 1 | 51 | 12 | +39 | 35 |
| 2 | FC Santa Clarita | 14 | 8 | 3 | 3 | 40 | 24 | +16 | 27 |
| 3 | Fullerton Rangers | 14 | 8 | 2 | 4 | 35 | 24 | +8 | 26 |
| 4 | San Diego Boca | 14 | 5 | 3 | 6 | 33 | 27 | +6 | 18 |
| 5 | FC Hasental | 14 | 4 | 2 | 8 | 20 | 27 | −7 | 14 |
| 6 | Phoenix Monsoon | 12 | 0 | 0 | 12 | 6 | 59 | −53 | 0 |

== Playoffs ==
=== Format ===
NORTHEAST
The top two finishers in the Keystone and Atlantic Conference play in a crossover playoff.

WEST
The top two finishers in the North and South place in a crossover playoff.

MIDWEST-CENTRAL
No playoff. Champion qualifies for National Tournament.

MIDWEST-GREAT LAKES
Top four teams are playing in a playoff tournament.

SOUTHEAST
East and West Division winners play each other for Championship.

=== Northeast Division Playoffs ===
July 14, 2012
7:00 PM EDT

| FC Sonic | 2–0 | Brooklyn Italians |
|---|---|---|
| Strunk 30'; Fraser 63' |

Ulrich Sports Complex
Bethlehem, PA

July 14, 2012
8:00 PM EDT

| New York Red Bulls U-23 | 2–0 | Morris County Colonials |
|---|---|---|
| Gurel 86'; Akinyode 90' | Report |

Lubetkin Field
Newark, NJ

July 21, 2012
7:00 PM EDT

| FC Sonic | 3–2 | New York Red Bulls U-23 |
|---|---|---|
| Sales 16'; Mustac 26'; Letourneau 40' | Report | Westlake 58'; Metzger 70' |

Ulrich Sports Complex
Bethlehem, PA

Divisional Semifinals
K1 | FC Sonic | 2
A2 | Brooklyn Italians | 0
A1 | New York Red Bulls U-23 | 2
K2 | Morris County Colonials | 0

Divisional Final
K1 | FC Sonic | 3
A1 | New York Red Bulls U-23 | 2

=== West Division Playoffs ===
July 14, 2012
7:00 PM PDT

| Bay Area Ambassadors | 3–2 | FC Santa Clarita |
|---|---|---|
| Klimenta 21'; Samy 65' (pen.); Walle 84' | | Bueno 15'; Hindjosa 32' |

Raimondi Park
Oakland, CA

July 14, 2012
7:00 PM PDT

| San Diego Flash | 2–2 (a.e.t.) | Sonoma County Sol |
|---|---|---|
| Valle 90+3'; DuBois 101' | | Ferreira 61'; Callahan 118' |
Penalties
| Pizarro (penalty scored); DuBois (penalty missed); Perez-Bernal (penalty scored); Ortega (penalty missed) | 2–4 | (penalty scored) Middlemiss; (penalty scored) Lombardi; (penalty scored) Larson; (penalty scored) Ferreira |

Del Norte High School Stadium
San Diego, CA

July 21, 2012
7:00 PM PDT

| Bay Area Ambassadors | 4–1 | Sonoma County Sol |
|---|---|---|
| Keyes 3'; Klimenta 18' 29'; Cashmere 90' | Report | Callahan 70' |

Raimondi Park
Oakland, CA

Divisional Semifinals
N1 | Bay Area Ambassadors | 3
S2 | FC Santa Clarita | 2
S1 | San Diego Flash | 2(2)
N2 | Sonoma County Sol (AET) (PEN) | 2(4)

Divisional Final
N1 | Bay Area Ambassadors | 4
N2 | Sonoma County Sol | 1

=== Midwest-Great Lakes Playoffs ===
July 14, 2012
5:00 PM EDT

| Erie Admirals SC | 1–0 | Greater Binghamton FC |
|---|---|---|
| Howard 16' | Report |

Gannon University Field
Erie, PA

July 14, 2012
7:00 PM EDT

| Detroit City FC | 1–2 | AFC Cleveland |
|---|---|---|
| Bethel 3' | Report | Bell 22'; Schmitt 90+1' |

Gannon University Field
Erie, PA

July 15, 2012
3:00 PM EDT

| Erie Admirals SC | 1–1 (a.e.t.) | AFC Cleveland |
|---|---|---|
| Mahon 45' | Report | Miller 80' (pen.) |
Penalties
| Livingston (penalty scored); Kennedy (penalty missed); Mahon (penalty scored); Johnstone (penalty scored); Latifi (penalty missed) | 3–4 | (penalty scored) Winters; (penalty missed) Manna; (penalty scored) Earnest; (penalty scored) Bell; (penalty scored) Matlock |

Gannon University Field
Erie, PA
Attendance: 800

Divisional Semifinals
GL1 | Erie Admirals SC | 1
GL4 | Greater Binghamton FC | 0
GL2 | Detroit City FC | 1
GL3 | AFC Cleveland | 2

Divisional Final
GL1 | Erie Admirals SC | 1(3)
GL3 | AFC Cleveland (AET) (PEN) | 1(4)

=== South-Southeast Final ===
July 14, 2012
8:30 PM EDT

| Georgia Revolution | 0–1 | Chattanooga FC |
|---|---|---|
| | Report | Trude 72' |

RYSA Soccerplex
Conyers, GA

=== Midwest Final ===
July 22, 2012
2:00 PM EDT

| AFC Cleveland | 1–2 | Madison 56ers |
|---|---|---|
| Bell (yellow card) 45'; Knight (yellow card) 54'; Matlock 67' | Report | McCrary 30' 47'; Balshaw (yellow card) 85'; O'Connor (yellow card) 90+4' |

Brecksville-Broadview Heights High School
Broadview Heights, OH

== NPSL Championship ==
=== Semi-finals ===
July 27, 2012
3:00 PM PDT

| FC Sonic | 2–0 | Madison 56ers |
|---|---|---|
| Graf 57' (pen.); Fraser 75' | Report |

Del Norte High School Stadium
San Diego, CA

July 27, 2012
7:00 PM PDT

| Chattanooga FC | 3–2 | Bay Area Ambassadors |
|---|---|---|
| Stewart 10'; Rardon 31'; Trude 78' | Report | Cashmere 69'; Clemens 88' |

Del Norte High School Stadium
San Diego, CA

=== Third Place Playoff ===
July 28, 2012
7:00 PM PDT

| Madison 56ers | 3–2 | Bay Area Ambassadors |
|---|---|---|
| Pitts 20'; Holbein 23'; Holbein 50' | Report | Lopes 40'; Cashmere 57' |

Del Norte High School Stadium
San Diego, CA

=== NPSL Championship Game ===
July 29, 2012
12:00 PM PDT

| FC Sonic | 1–0 | Chattanooga FC |
|---|---|---|
| Sandercock 78' | Report |

Del Norte High School Stadium
San Diego, CA

National Semifinals
K1 | FC Sonic | 2
C1 | Madison 56ers | 0
SW1 | Chattanooga FC | 3
N1 | Bay Area Ambassadors | 2

National Championship
K1 | FC Sonic | 1
SW1 | Chattanooga FC | 0
