= 2011 NPSL season =

National Premier Soccer League
- Official 2011 NPSL Championship logo
- Season: 2011
- Champions: Jacksonville United (1st Title)
- Regular Season Champions: Erie Admirals SC (2nd Title)
- Matches: 220
- Goals: 710 (3.23 per match)
- Biggest home win: 11–0, Hollywood United Hitmen over Real San Jose
- Biggest away win: 9–0, Madison 56ers over Eau Claire Aris
- Highest scoring: 12 goals, Bay Area Ambassadors 4–8 Lancaster Rattlers

The 2011 National Premier Soccer League season was the 9th season of the NPSL. The regular season began on April 1, 2011, and ended on July 17. The playoffs concluded with the NPSL Championship Game, which was held at the home of Rocket City United in Madison, Alabama on July 30.

Jacksonville United ended the season as national champions, beating the Hollywood United Hitmen 3–2 in the 2011 NPSL Championship game. Jacksonville were the lowest seeded-team in the playoffs, having finished champions of the Southeast Division with a 6–0–4 record after starting their campaign with four straight losses, and beat number one seed and Northeast Division champions Erie Admirals on their way to the final. Both Jacksonville and Hollywood were first-year NPSL teams, although Hollywood had previously spent two seasons playing in the USL Premier Development League.

The Erie Admirals had the best regular season record, with a points-per-game average of 2.583, just ahead of the Hollywood United Hitmen (2.429) and FC Sonic Lehigh Valley (2.417), who were in such a strong division they did not even qualify for the post-season.

Jacksonville striker Tommy Krizanovic scored a hat trick in the NPSL final, and was named MVP of the championship tournament.

== Changes From 2010 ==
=== Name Changes/Rebrands ===
- Atlanta FC formed a partnership with the NASL Atlanta Silverbacks franchise and became Atlanta Silverbacks Reserves

=== New Franchises ===
- 13 franchises were announced as joining the league this year:

Team name	Metro area	Location	Previous affiliation
AC Crusaders	Atlantic County area	Egg Harbor Township, NJ	expansion
Buxmont Torch FC	Montgomery County area	Souderton, PA	expansion
Georgia Revolution	Rockdale County area	Conyers, GA	expansion
FC Hasental	Conejo Valley area	Thousand Oaks, CA	expansion
Hollywood United Hitmen	Los Angeles area	Los Angeles, CA	USL Premier Development League
Jacksonville United	Jacksonville area	Jacksonville, FL	expansion
Knoxville Force	Knoxville area	Knoxville, TN	expansion
Lancaster Rattlers	Antelope Valley area	Lancaster, CA	USL Premier Development League
Mass United	Boston area	Boston, MA	expansion
Quad City Eagles	Quad Cities area	Moline, IL	expansion
San Diego Flash	San Diego area	San Diego, CA	USL A-League
Santa Ana Winds	Orange County area	Santa Ana, CA	expansion
Seacoast United Phantoms	Rockingham County area	Hampton, NH	expansion

=== Folding ===
- Six teams have been announced as leaving the league prior to the beginning of the season:
- Boston Tea Men MA
- Long Island Academy NY
- TSC Maryland Red Devils MD
- New Hampshire Mountaineers NH
- Pumas FC AL
- Southern Oregon Fuego OR
- FC Tulsa TX

== Standings ==
Purple indicates division title clinched
Green indicates playoff berth clinched

=== Northeast Division - Atlantic Conference ===
Place	Team	Pld.	W	T	L	GF	GA	GD	Points
1	Brooklyn Italians	10	7	1	2	26	11	+15	22
2	Seacoast United Phantoms	10	5	1	4	16	19	-3	16
3	New York Red Bulls NPSL	10	4	3	3	16	11	+5	15
4	New York Athletic Club	10	4	3	3	15	12	+3	15
5	Morris County Colonials	10	2	3	5	13	21	-8	9
6	Mass United	10	2	1	7	13	25	-12	7

=== Northeast Division - Keystone Conference ===
Place	Team	Pld.	W	T	L	GF	GA	GD	Points
1	Erie Admirals	12	10	1	1	30	11	+19	31
2	FC Sonic Lehigh Valley	12	9	2	1	25	7	+18	29
3	Reading Revolution	12	8	1	3	28	13	+15	25
4	AC Crusaders	12	6	3	3	27	15	+12	21
5	FC Buffalo	12	5	1	6	21	15	+6	16
6	Pocono Snow	12	2	2	8	11	27	-16	8
7	Buxmont Torch FC	12	2	0	10	11	36	-25	6
8	New Jersey Blaze	12	1	0	11	12	41	-29	3

=== Southeast Division ===
Place	Team	Pld.	W	T	L	GF	GA	GD	Points
1	Jacksonville United	10	6	0	4	16	12	+4	18
2	Georgia Revolution	10	5	3	2	20	15	+5	18
3	Chattanooga FC	10	5	2	3	15	10	+5	17
4	Atlanta Silverbacks Reserves	10	4	2	4	14	13	+1	14
5	Knoxville Force	10	3	1	6	7	16	-9	10
6	Rocket City United	10	3	0	7	12	18	-6	9
7	FC Tulsa	0	0	0	0	0	0	0	0

*Note: Jacksonville finished ahead of Georgia as NPSL rules state that the second tiebreaker after total points is number of victories. FC Tulsa chose not to compete in league play in 2011, and only played in the US Open Cup qualification tournament.

=== Midwest Division ===
Place	Team	Pld.	W	T	L	GF	GA	GD	Points
1	Milwaukee Bavarians	12	8	2	2	25	9	+16	26
2	Quad City Eagles	12	6	5	1	27	11	+16	23
3	Madison 56ers	12	6	3	3	34	14	+20	21
4	Minnesota TwinStars FC	12	6	1	5	23	15	+8	19
5	Chicago Fire NPSL	12	4	3	5	18	16	+2	15
6	Minnesota Kings	12	2	2	8	9	34	-25	8
7	Eau Claire Aris	12	1	2	9	8	45	-37	5

=== West Division - Flight Northwest ===
Place	Team	Pld.	W	T	L	GF	GA	GD	Points
1	Hollywood United Hitmen	14	11	1	2	54	14	+40	34
2	Sacramento Gold	14	7	4	3	30	20	+10	25
3	Sonoma County Sol	14	7	3	4	38	23	+15	24
4	Bay Area Ambassadors	14	2	1	11	19	48	-29	7
5	Real San Jose	14	2	0	12	11	45	-34	6

=== West Division - Flight Southwest ===
Place	Team	Pld.	W	T	L	GF	GA	GD	Points
1	San Diego Flash	14	10	1	3	37	16	+21	31
2	Santa Ana Winds FC	14	8	2	4	25	19	+6	26
3	FC Hasental	14	6	3	5	27	27	0	21
4	San Diego Boca	14	6	1	7	29	32	-3	19
5	Lancaster Rattlers	14	3	0	11	26	52	-26	9

== NPSL Playoffs ==
=== Bracket ===
Division Semifinals
NW1	Hollywood United Hitmen	3
SW2	Santa Ana Winds FC	1
SW1	San Diego Flash	1
NW2	Sacramento Gold	2

Division Finals
K1	Erie Admirals	1
A1	Brooklyn Italians	0
NW1	Hollywood United Hitmen	1
NW2	Sacramento Gold	0

National Semifinals
1	Erie Admirals	2
4	Jacksonville United	4
3	Milwaukee Bavarians	0
2	Hollywood United Hitmen	3

National Final
4	Jacksonville United	3
2	Hollywood United Hitmen	2

=== Northeast Division Playoffs ===
July 23, 2011
7:00 PM EST

Erie Admirals	1 - 0	Brooklyn Italians
Colton 72'	Report

Dollinger Field
Erie, PA
Attendance: 450

=== West Division Playoffs ===
July 9, 2011
7:00 PM PST

Hollywood United Hitmen	3 - 1	Santa Ana Winds
Bentil 17'; Whitfield 31'; Blanco 50'	Report	Hernandez (red card) 10'; G. Piechota 35'

Crenshaw High School
Los Angeles, CA
Attendance: 165
Referee: Omar Meza (USA)

July 9, 2011
7:00 PM PST

San Diego Flash	1 - 2	Sacramento Gold
Pizarro 43'	Report	O. Sandoval 35'; Cabadas 76'

Westview High School
San Diego, CA

July 16, 2011
5:00 PM PST

Hollywood United Hitmen	1 - 0	Sacramento Gold
Blanco 45'	Report	C. Sandoval (red card) 28'; Madu (red card) 44'

Crenshaw High School
Los Angeles, CA
Attendance: 135
Referee: Daniel Radford (USA)

=== NPSL Championship Tournament ===
==== Semi-finals ====
July 28, 2011
5:30PM CDT

Hollywood United Hitmen	3 - 0	Milwaukee Bavarians
Bentil 48'; Whitfield 67' 88'	Report

Madison City Schools Stadium
Madison, AL

July 28, 2011
8:30PM CDT

Erie Admirals	2 - 4	Jacksonville United
Falconer 22'; Kennedy 58'	Report	Williams 42'; Krizanovic 61'; Leyimu 72'; Salafrio 73'

Madison City Schools Stadium
Madison, AL

==== Third Place Playoff ====
July 29, 2011
5:30PM CDT

Milwaukee Bavarians	0 - 5	Erie Admirals
	Report	Falconer 33' 72'; Meehl 67'; Blythe 82'; Howard 88'

Madison City Schools Stadium
Madison, AL

==== NPSL All-Star Game ====
July 29, 2011
8:00PM CDT

Rocket City United	3 - 1	NPSL All-Stars
Hyde 27' 61'; Nkurunungi 90'	Report	Omondi 63'

Madison City Schools Stadium
Madison, AL
Referee: Joshua Morgan (USA)

==== NPSL Championship Game ====
July 30, 2011
7:30PM CDT

Hollywood United Hitmen	2 - 3	Jacksonville United
Albarrán 31' 77'	Report	Krizanovic 17' 40' 87'

Madison City Schools Stadium
Madison, AL

== Award Winners and Conference Teams ==
MVP: (Croatia) Tommy Krizanovic (JAC)

=== NPSL All-Star Team ===
F: (Trinidad and Tobago) Jumol Harewood (GEO), (Cuba) Jose Miranda (HOL), (Canada) Justin Picou (SDB), (United States) Afrim Latifi (ERI), (United States) Chris Tsonis (SEA)
M: (United States) Cody Antonini (SLV), (Jamaica) Carlington Lamont (REA), (United States) Carlos McCrary (MAD), (Ghana) Kingsley Morgan (ATL), (United States) Anthony Santaga (MAD), (United States) Billy Sweatra (ACC), (United States) Tyler Williams (JAC)
D: (United States) Peassio Denev (ECA), (United States) Adrian Kawuba (MAS), (Argentina) Marcos Mendez (GEO), (Kenya) Joseph Omondi (RCU), (United States) Corey Phillips (BUF), (United States) Dan Sauerhoff (MCC), (England) Andy Stewart (CFC)
G: (United States) Zach Brunner (LAN), (United States) Thomas Hunter (CFC)

=== 2011 National Championship Best 11 ===
F: (Croatia) Tommy Krizanovic (JAC), (United States) Brent Whitfield (HOL)
M: (El Salvador) Arturo Albarrán (HOL), (Republic of Ireland) Gavin Falconer (ERI), (Panama) Amilcar Herrera (MIL), (Republic of Ireland) Shane Howard (ERI), (Iran) Ramak Safi (JAC)
D: (United States) Jacobi Goodfellow (JAC), (United States) Garrett Teague (JAC), (United States) Marcus Watson (HOL)
G: (United States) Stuart McCrory (JAC)

== U.S. Open Cup Qualifying ==
Four NPSL clubs gained berths to the 2011 U.S. Open Cup, one each from the Northeast, Southeast, Midwest and West divisions.

=== Northeast Division ===
May 7, 2011

Brooklyn Italians	1 - 0	FC Buffalo
Joseph 25'	Report

James Dewey High School
Brooklyn, NY

May 27, 2011
7:30 PM EST

FC Sonic Lehigh Valley	1 - 2	Brooklyn Italians
	Report

Ulrich Sports Complex
Bethlehem, PA

=== Southeast Division ===
==== First round ====
May 27, 2011
5:30 PM EST

Knoxville Force	0 - 1	Jacksonville United
	Report	Williams 53'

Finley Stadium
Chattanooga, TN

May 27, 2011
8:00 PM EST

Rocket City United	7 - 1	FC Tulsa
Hyde 13' 22' 33' 64'; Nkurunungi 59'; Nunez 80'; Omondi 88'	Report	Cottage 31'

Finley Stadium
Chattanooga, TN

==== Second round ====
May 28, 2011
5:30 PM EST

Atlanta Silverbacks Reserves	3 - 1	Jacksonville United
Nandi 28'; Morgan 86'; Duque 90+'	Report	Williams 23'

Finley Stadium
Chattanooga, TN

May 28, 2011
8:00 PM EST

Chattanooga FC	2 - 0	Rocket City United
Moore 65'; Ochieng 74'	Report

Finley Stadium
Chattanooga, TN
Attendance: 1,350

==== Final ====
May 29, 2011
7:00 PM EST

Atlanta Silverbacks Reserves	0 - 1 (AET)	Chattanooga FC
	Report	Ochieng 116'

Finley Stadium
Chattanooga, TN
Attendance: 1,402

=== Midwest Division ===
Madison 56ers were granted the automatic berth for the Midwest Division by virtue of their 2010 division championship. The Midwest was the only NPSL division granting its 2011 U.S. Open Cup berth based on performance in the 2010 season.

=== West Division ===
The Hollywood United Hitmen were given the berth for the West Division as a result of being the team with the best record over the first seven games of the 2011 regular season.
