= CD Aguiluchos USA =

American soccer team

- Full name: Club Deportivo Aguiluchos USA
- Founded: 2012; 13 years ago
- Stadium: Raimondi Park; Oakland, California
- Capacity: ~2,000
- Chairman: Roger Amaya
- Head Coach: Francisco Juarez
- League: National Premier Soccer League
- 2017: 1st, Golden Gate Conference; Playoffs: West Region Champions, National Semifinalist
- Website: http://www.cdaguiluchosusa.org/
Home colors	Away colors

Club Deportivo Aguiluchos USA is an American soccer club, founded in 2012 and based in Oakland, California, that competes in the West Region, Golden Gate Conference of the National Premier Soccer League, the fourth division of the American soccer pyramid.

The club plays its home games at Raimondi Park. Its colors are orange and black, drawing inspiration from Águila of El Salvador, with a secondary kit of all blue, taking after the El Salvador flag and national team.

== History ==
CD Aguiluchos USA was founded in 2012 as a tribute to Águila of El Salvador and as a community club for many players of Salvadoran descent in Northern California. In December 2012, the team announced that it would be joining the National Premier Soccer League (NPSL), considered the fourth tier of the American soccer pyramid and roughly equal to the USL Premier Development League (PDL). The club would be coached by Argentine and notable former Águila player and manager, Hugo Coria, who led the Salvadoran club to three major titles.

The team played its first match on March 30, 2013; a 2–0 loss to Real San Jose. The team won its first competitive game on April 13, 4–0 at home over San Francisco Stompers FC, with a hat-trick by Jorge Ruiz and a lone goal by William Colocho.

In March 2014, Aguiluchos USA defeated Spartans Futbol Club 2–1, thanks to goals by Jorge Ruiz and former El Salvador international Rudis Corrales, which helped them qualify to the US Open Cup for the first time in the club history.

== Colors and crest ==
Aguiluchos USA home uniform mirrors that of the club it is named after, Águila of El Salvador, with an orange shirt, black shorts, and orange socks. Aguiluchos USA has worn a variation of this kit since its inception, with slight variations in trim, stripe width, number of stripes, and other minor details. The club usually complements this with a white and orange away uniform, with an additional away kit that mirrors the El Salvador national football team, with a blue shirt with white stripes, blue shorts, and blue socks.

The club badge features an eagle with two flags representing El Salvador and United States of America.

== Year-by-year ==
Year	Division	League	Regular season	W-L-D	Playoffs	Open Cup
2013	4	NPSL	4th, Northern Division	3–6–3	did not qualify	did not qualify
2014	4	NPSL	3rd, Golden Gate Conference	5–2–5	did not qualify	1st Round
2015	4	NPSL	3rd, Golden Gate Conference	7–1–4	National Semi Final	did not qualify
2016	4	NPSL	2nd, Golden Gate Conference	7–3–4	West Regional 1st Round	2nd Round
2017	4	NPSL	1st, Golden Gate Conference	8–3–1	National Semi Final	did not qualify
2018	4	NPSL	2nd, Golden Gate Conference	8-3-3	West Regional 1st Round	1st Round

== Honors ==
- Western Regional Champs (Playoff NPSL):
  - Winners (2): 2015, 2017
- Golden Gate Conference (NPSL):
  - Winners (1): 2017

== Current squad ==
Note: Flags indicate national team as defined under FIFA eligibility rules; some limited exceptions apply. Players may hold more than one non-FIFA nationality.

No.	Pos.	Nation	Player
1	GK	USA	Adrian Topete
3	DF	PER	Victor Ramirez
4	DF	USA	Anthony De Souza
5	DF	USA	Jose Cabeza
6	MF	USA	Ahmad Arash Hatifie
7	MF	SLV	Jorge Morán
8	MF	USA	Arnol Arceta
9	FW	ENG	Simon Rawnsley
10	FW	SLV	Carlos Aparicio
11	FW	USA	Ross Middlemiss
0	GK	USA	Kevin Gonzalez

No.	Pos.	Nation	Player
13	DF	HON	Mario Torres
14	DF	USA	Bengy Ruiz
15	DF	AFG	Navid Sharifi
17	MF	USA	Nissa Hatifie
18	MF	MEX	Ricardo Guerra
19	FW	USA	Marco Villa
20	MF	USA	Christian Valdez
21	GK	USA	Kevin Esquivel
22	MF	USA	Miguel Santiago
23	MF	MEX	Jesus Maldonado
25	MF	BRA	Matheus Freire

=== In ===
Note: Flags indicate national team as defined under FIFA eligibility rules; some limited exceptions apply. Players may hold more than one non-FIFA nationality.

No. / Pos. / Nation / Player; — / FW / SLV / Carlos Aparicio (From FAS)	No. / Pos. / Nation / Player; — / MF / SLV / Jorge Morán (From FAS)

=== Out ===
Note: Flags indicate national team as defined under FIFA eligibility rules; some limited exceptions apply. Players may hold more than one non-FIFA nationality.

No. / Pos. / Nation / Player; — / MF / USA / TBA (To TBA)	No. / Pos. / Nation / Player; — / FW / USA / TBA (To TBA)

== Personnel ==
=== Coaching staff ===
Position	Staff
Manager	(Mexico) Francisco Juarez
Assistant Managers	(United States) David Lorenzana
Sports Director	(El Salvador) Roger Amaya
Fitness Coach	(United States) Jose Mena
Team Doctor	
Kinesologisr	
Physiotherapist	

=== Management ===
Position	Staff
Owner	(El Salvador) Asociacion De Salvadoreños en USA
President	(United States) Roger Amaya
Vice President	
Honorary President	
Administrative Manager	
Secretary	
Club Scout	

== Stadium ==
- Raimondi Park Stadium; Oakland, California (2013–2016,2018)
- Burrell Field; San Leandro, California (2017)

== Head coaches ==
- Hugo Coria (2013-2016)
- Francisco Juarez (Aug 2017-)

== See also ==
- C.D. Águila, the parent club of C.D. Aguiluchos USA
- Chivas USA
