= Foster High School =

Foster High School can refer to:

- Foster High School (Fort Bend County, Texas)
- Foster High School (Tukwila, Washington)
