= ASA Charge =

- Full name: ASA Charge Football Club
- Founded: 2010
- Ground: Arundel High School stadium Gambrills, Maryland
- Capacity: 4,000
- Owner: Arundel Soccer Association
- General Manager: Pat Crawford
- Head Coach: Tim Wittman
- League: National Premier Soccer League
- 2014: Inaugural NPSL season
- Website: https://web.archive.org/web/20161004115254/http://www.asacharge.com

ASA Charge was an American soccer club based in Gambrills, Maryland that played in the National Premier Soccer League (NPSL), the fourth tier of the American soccer pyramid, from 2014 to 2016 in the Mid-Atlantic Conference of the South Region. The club was affiliated with the women's squad ASA Chesapeake Charge of Women's Premier Soccer League Elite (WPSL Elite).

The club played its home games out of Arundel High School stadium and its colors were blue, white and red.

== History ==
The ASA Charge announced that they would join the National Premier Soccer League (NPSL), considered the fourth tier of the American soccer pyramid and roughly equal to the USL Premier Development League (PDL), on December 21, 2013. The Charge would be owned and operated by the Arundel Soccer Association (ASA), the fourth largest soccer club in Maryland. The club would begin play for the 2014 NPSL season in the Mid-Atlantic Conference of the South Region, playing home games out of Arundel High School stadium in Gambrills, Maryland. The club would be led by local former player and manager of Charm City FC, General Manager Pat Crawford, with another local former player, Tim Wittman as head coach. As for the 2017 season, ASA Charge chose to not participate in the NPSL.
