= Storm FC =

- Full name: Storm Football Club
- Nickname: Storm FC
- Founded: 2013
- Stadium: Central Broward Stadium
- Chairman: (Mexico) José Alfredo Reygadas
- Manager: (Spain) Enrique Guijarro
- League: National Premier Soccer League
- Website: storm-fc.com
Home colours	Away colours

Storm FC is an American soccer club based in Pembroke Pines, Florida member of the NPSL playing in the South Region - Sunshine Conference. The club was founded in 2013 and currently competes against Jacksonville Armada U23, Miami United, Orlando Kraze United SC, Miami Fusion, Naples United, Beaches FC and Boca Raton FC in the Sunshine Conference.

== History ==
The club was officially accepted into the National Premier Soccer League on October 3, 2013.

== Year by year ==
Year	Tier	League	Regular season		Playoffs	U.S. Open Cup
2014	4	NPSL	Sunshine Conference	3rd	Conference semifinals	Ineligible
2015	4	NPSL	Sunshine Conference	6th	did not qualify	did not qualify
2016	4	NPSL	Sunshine Conference	5th	did not qualify	did not qualify
2017	On Hiatus					
2018	4	NPSL	Sunshine Conference	7th	did not qualify	Ineligible
2019	4	NPSL	Sunshine Conference	6th	did not qualify	did not qualify

== Stadium ==
Storm FC used to play at Central Broward Regional Park in Lauderhill, Florida, moving to Pembroke Pines Charter High School Stadium, a 3000-seat stadium in Pembroke Pines, Florida, for the 2016 season.
