= Torch FC =

- Full name: Torch Football Club
- Founded: 2009; 17 years ago
- Stadium: Pennridge High School Stadium; Perkasie, Bucks County, Pennsylvania
- Capacity: 10,000
- Owner: Torch Sports Ministry
- Head Coach: Rich Sparling
- League: National Premier Soccer League
- 2019: 6th, Keystone Conference; Playoffs: did not qualify
- Website: http://www.torchsportsministry.org/
Home colors	Away colors

Torch FC, formerly Buxmont Torch FC, is an American soccer club currently competing in the NPSL. They play in the Keystone Conference of the National Premier Soccer League, the fourth tier of the United States soccer league system. Torch FC's home field is Pennridge High School Stadium in Perkasie, Bucks County, Pennsylvania.

== Year-by-year ==
Year	League	Regular season	Playoffs	U.S Open Cup
2011	NPSL	7th, Keystone Conference	DNQ	Not eligible
2012	NPSL	7th, Keystone Conference	DNQ	DNQ
2013	NPSL	8th, Keystone Conference	DNQ	DNQ
2014	NPSL	4th, Keystone Conference	DNQ	DNQ
2015	NPSL	3rd, Keystone Conference	DNQ	DNQ
2016	NPSL	7th, Keystone Conference	DNQ	DNQ
2017	NPSL	5th, Keystone Conference	DNQ	DNQ
2018	NPSL	9th, Keystone Conference	DNQ	DNQ
2019	NPSL	6th, Keystone Conference	DNQ	DNQ
