= North Coast Tsunami =

North Coast Tsunami FC
- Full name: North Coast Tsunami Football Club
- Nicknames: North Coast Tsunami FC, NCTFC
- Founded: 2012
- Ground: College of the Redwoods Community Stadium; Eureka, CA
- Owner: Alan Exley
- Head Coach: Pete Fuller
- League: National Premier League
- Website: http://northcoasttsunami.com
Home colours	Away colours

North Coast Tsunami FC is an American professional soccer club based in California currently playing in US Club Soccer's National Premier League. The team originally started play in the NPSL in 2012.

== History ==
During the club's only season in the NPSL they finished in last place in the West Region - Northern Conference with a 3-1-9 record. While in the NPSL, Sergio Guerrero was named a Player of the Week in a game the Tsunami won 1–0 over the Sonoma County Sol after saving 19 shots on goal. The club moved down to National Premier League in 2013. The club stated the move will provide the Tsunami the opportunity to compete year round as part of the NorCal Premier League, starting with the U-23 College Summer League.

== Year-by-year ==
Year	Division	League	Regular season	Playoffs	Open Cup
2012	4	NPSL	6th, West Region - Northern Conference	Did not qualify	Did not qualify

== Stadium ==
The team plays at the College of the Redwoods Community Stadium in Eureka, CA.
