= Fort Pitt Regiment =

- Full name: Fort Pitt Regiment
- Nickname: The Regiment
- Founded: 2013
- Dissolved: 2018
- Stadium: Highmark Stadium; Pittsburgh, PA
- Capacity: ~5,000
- Association President: Natalie Schwoeble
- Head Coach: John Kowalski
- League: National Premier Soccer League
- Website: http://fortpittregiment.com
Home colours	Away colours

Fort Pitt Regiment was an American soccer club based in Pittsburgh, Pennsylvania. Founded in 2013, the team played its first season in 2014 as a member of the National Premier Soccer League (NPSL) in the Great Lakes Conference of the Midwest Region. The team was named following a name the team contest that included West Penn United and Pittsburgh Rebellion as the other two options. The team ended play in 2018 and was replaced next season by the Pittsburgh Hotspurs as the Pittsburgh area's NPSL club.

== Players ==
as of May 17, 2016

Note: Flags indicate national team as defined under FIFA eligibility rules; some limited exceptions apply. Players may hold more than one non-FIFA nationality.

No.	Pos.	Nation	Player
3	FW	GUI	Lamine Balde
13	MF	USA	Nick Kolarac (captain)
5	DF	USA	Marc Alexander
11	MF	BRA	Tulio Canineu
8	MF	BRA	Lucas Canineu
15	DF	USA	Ameer Caprini
22	DF	USA	Max Flick
16	DF	USA	Dom Galietta
10	FW	BRA	Lucas Godinho
4	MF	USA	Jacob Gratzner
17	DF	USA	Michael Horgan

No.	Pos.	Nation	Player
12	MF	USA	Anthony Virgara
20	MF	USA	Nick Kalogeris
14	DF	USA	Ryan Landry
24	DF	USA	Matt McDyer
00	GK	USA	Scott Rissler
0	GK	USA	Christian Snatchko
1	GK	USA	Robbie McKelvey
21	DF	ESP	Mikel Ubeda
6	MF	ESP	Joaquin Vicent Franch
9	MF	USA	Nick Sodini
27	FW	KEN	Arkangelo James

=== Notable former players ===
This list of notable former players comprises players who went on to play professional soccer after playing for the team in the NPSL, or those who previously played professionally before joining the team.

- (United States) Nick Kolarac
- (Jamaica) Neco Brett

== Honors ==
=== Domestic League ===
- Midwest Region - Great Lakes East Conference (NPSL)
  - Champions (1): 2014

== Year-by-year ==
Year	Tier	League	Regular Season	Playoffs	Open Cup
2014	4	NPSL	1st of 4, Midwest-Great Lakes East (6-5-3)	Regional Final	Not eligible
2015	4	NPSL	12th of 13, Midwest Region (2-2-8)	Did not qualify	First round
2017	4	NPSL	6th of 7, Great Lakes Conference (3-7-1)	Did not qualify	Not eligible
2018	4	NPSL	5th out of 8, East Conference (6-5-1)	Did not qualify	Not eligible

== Rivalries ==
Fort Pitt Regiment had rivalries with other Great Lakes region NPSL clubs, including Cleveland SC and the Erie Commodores FC.

== Stadia ==
- Montour High School (2014–2015)
