= FC Bordo Saint Louis =

FC Bordo
- Full name: Football Club Bordo Saint Louis
- Nicknames: Bordo, Los Vinotintos (Red Wine), Wolves
- Founded: 2013
- Ground: Saint Louis University High School; St. Louis, Missouri
- Capacity: 1,100
- General Manager: Sanjin Žigić
- Manager: Nenad Ćurić
- League: NPSL
Home colors	Away colors

FC Bordo Saint Louis is a soccer organization based in St. Louis, Missouri. The team announced they would participate in the National Premier Soccer League starting with the 2014 season.

== Staff ==
- General Manager – (Bosnia and Herzegovina) Sanjin Žigić (2014)
- Head Coach – (Serbia) Nenad Ćurić (2014)
- Sports Director – (Serbia) Boban Simović (2014)
- Sales Development Manager (United States) Taylor Madden (2014)

== 2014 Roster ==
Note: Flags indicate national team as defined under FIFA eligibility rules; some limited exceptions apply. Players may hold more than one non-FIFA nationality.

No.	Pos.	Nation	Player
1	GK	USA	Alan Hagerty
3	DF	USA	John Bilyeu
4	DF	MEX	Sebastian Reyes
5	DF	LCA	Dwight Degazon
6	MF	SRB	Boban Simović
7	FW	ESP	José Silva
8	MF	ESP	Jose Sanchez
9	FW	BIH	Denis Hamzabegović
10	DF	SRB	Nenad Ćurić
11	FW	PAN	Emanuel Forbes
12	MF	USA	Jonathan Fridal
13	MF	BIH	Saldin Bajramović
14	MF	CRO	Hrvoje Bagarić
15	DF	USA	Vallrick Fullins
16	FW	HON	Daniel Caballero

No.	Pos.	Nation	Player
17	FW	BIH	Nijaz Muratović
18	FW	BIH	Dani Delić
19	MF	USA	Cody Costakis
20	MF	SRB	Nenad Todorović
21	FW	URU	Mauricio Medina
22	DF	VEN	Axel Duarte
23	DF	USA	Zachary Kittrell
24	GK	USA	Doug Lampert
25	FW	BIH	Amar Subašić
27	MF	USA	Brian Jurado
28	DF	BIH	Alen Bradarić
29	DF	BIH	Naser Mustafić
30	MF	BIH	Senad Čavka
33	DF	BIH	Kristijan Kristo
35	DF	BIH	Ernad Čavka
99	GK	USA	Blake Westerman
