= LC Aris FC =

- Full name: Aris Sports Club
- Nickname: Aris
- Founded: 2008
- Stadium: Logan High School
- Capacity: ~2,000
- Owner: (Greece) Greg Saliaras
- Head Coach: (Greece) Antonios Lepitsas
- League: NPSL
Home colors	Away colors

LC Aris FC was an American soccer team based in La Crosse, Wisconsin, United States. Founded in 2008, the team played in the National Premier Soccer League (NPSL), a regional amateur league at the fourth tier of the American Soccer Pyramid.

The team played its home games at Logan High School in La Crosse, Wisconsin. The team's colors were yellow, black and white.

== History ==
Aris FC joined the National Premier Soccer League as an expansion team in 2009, having been formed by Greek American businessman Greg Saliaras, the owner of a successful soccer store in Eau Claire, Wisconsin, and who named the team after his favorite club, Aris Thessaloniki. The team is affiliated with the EC Aris soccer team, which has been competing in youth soccer leagues in the Eau Claire area for many years.

The Aris played their first competitive game on May 31, 2009, a 5–0 loss to Wisconsin rivals Madison 56ers, which set the manner in which their first competitive season would continue; they did not achieve an on-field victory all year, picking up their only points when their opponents in their final regular season game, FC Indiana, forfeited the game. They finished second from bottom in the Midwest Division, only avoiding last spot as a result of Indiana's points deduction.

After five seasons in Eau Claire, the club relocated to La Crosse. LC Aris FC sat out the 2015 season, but returned to the NPSL Midwest in 2016. The team folded following the 2023 season to restructure, looking to launch a St. Paul-based club in 2026.

== Year-by-year ==
Year	League	Won	Lost	Tied	Regular season	Goals For	Goals Against	Difference	Playoffs	Open Cup
2009	NPSL	1	7	0	4th of 5, Midwest	7	29	-22	Did not qualify	Did not qualify
2010	NPSL	0	8	1	6th of 6, Midwest	13	45	-32	Did not qualify	Did not qualify
2011	NPSL	1	9	2	7th of 7, Midwest	8	45	-37	Did not qualify	Did not qualify
2012	NPSL	0	11	1	5th of 5, Midwest-Central	18	55	-37	Did not qualify	Did not qualify
2013	NPSL	1	9	2	5th of 5, Midwest-Central	15	40	-25	Did not qualify	Did not qualify
2014	NPSL	0	10	0	6th of 6, Midwest-Central	7	49	-42	Did not qualify	Did not qualify
2015	NPSL	On hiatus								
2016	NPSL	0	6	0	4th of 4, Midwest-Central	8	31	-23	Did not qualify	Did not qualify
2017	NPSL	0	13	1	8th of 8, Midwest-North	11	71	-60	Did not qualify	Did not qualify
2018	NPSL	0	13	1	8th of 8, Midwest-North	10	60	-50	Did not qualify	Did not qualify
2019	NPSL	2	10	0	7th of 7, Midwest-North	10	46	-36	Did not qualify	Did not qualify
2020	NPSL	Season cancelled due to COVID-19 pandemic								
2021	NPSL	0	9	3	7th of 7, Midwest-North	7	44	-37	Did not qualify	Did not qualify
2022	NPSL	3	11	0	8th of 8, Midwest-North	21	44	-23	Did not qualify	Did not qualify
2023	NPSL	2	9	1	6th of 7, Midwest-North	12	37	-25	Did not qualify	Did not qualify
Overall		10	125	11		147	596	-449		

== Head coaches ==
- (Greece) Antonios Lepitsas (2016–2023)
- (Mexico) Ezequiel Magallon (2012)
- (Greece) Greg Saliaras (2009–2011; 2013–2014)

== Stadia ==
- Bollinger Field; Eau Claire, Wisconsin (2009–2013)
- Dorais Field; Chippewa Falls, Wisconsin (2009)
- Viterbo Athletic Complex; La Crosse, Wisconsin (2013, 2014)
- Logan High School Stadium, La Crosse Wisconsin (2016-2023)
