= Chesterfield United FC =

American soccer team

- Full name: Chesterfield United Football Club
- Nickname: United
- Founded: 2013
- Ground: Williams Stadium; Richmond, Virginia
- Capacity: 19,200
- League: National Premier Soccer League
- 2014: 5th, Mid-Atlantic Division
- Website: http://www.chesterfieldunited.com

Chesterfield United FC is an American soccer team based in Richmond, Virginia. The team was established in 2013 and plays in the South Atlantic Division of the National Premier Soccer League (NPSL), which is the fourth tier of the American soccer pyramid. The team currently plays its home games at Williams Stadium. The team's colors are blue and white.

== History ==
The Chesterfield United Football Club is a result of 28 years of club development and evolution. The club debuted in 1980 as Dale Youth Soccer and in 1995 became Chesterfield Soccer Club. In 2002 Chesterfield Soccer Club merged with James River United to form Chesterfield United Soccer Club. On May 1, 2008 Chesterfield United Soccer Club made a subtle name change from “Soccer Club” to “Football Club” and is now known as Chesterfield United Football Club, Chesterfield United FC, CUFC or “United FC”.

The club merged with Richmond Strikers in February 2016, and is in the process of rebranding. Teams from the club will use either Richmond Strikers Chesterfield or Chesterfield Strikers as their name.

== Youth Club ==
Chesterfield United is a youth soccer club that caters to around 2,000 players in central Virginia. The club has 37 travel teams - 26 Boys teams and 11 Girls (450 players), plus 10 United Development Teams (70 players), and 60 recreation teams (800 per season). The club caters to players between the ages 4–18. Chesterfield United programs start at the beginner’s levels in the recreational program, progressing all the way United Development Program. At the highest level of play Chesterfield United’s Academy teams play in the prestigious Atlantic Soccer League, which provides some of the best competition on the east coast.

== Year-by-year ==
Year	Division	League	Regular season	Playoffs	Open Cup
2013	4	NPSL	4th, Mid-Atlantic	Did not qualify	Did not qualify
