= Victor Manosalvas =

Ecuadorian footballer (born 1992)

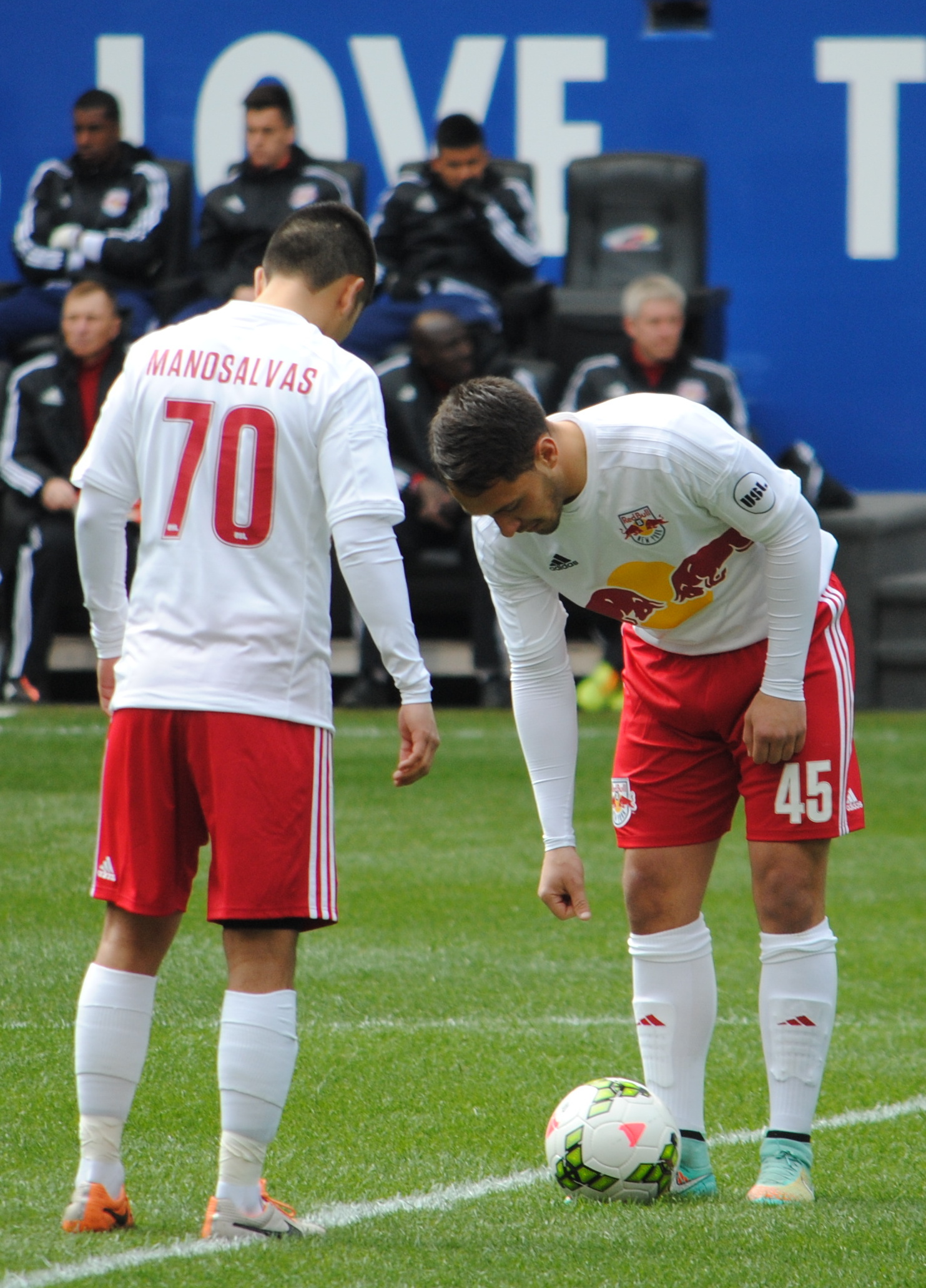
- Manosalvas and Chris Tsonis getting ready for kickoff playing for New York Red Bulls II in March 28, 2015 inaugural match.

Personal information
- Full name: Victor Manosalvas
- Date of birth: December 14, 1992 (age 33)
- Place of birth: Quevedo, Ecuador
- Height: 1.70 m (5 ft 7 in)
- Position: Midfielder

Youth career
- 2008–2010: New York Red Bulls
- 2010–2014: Seton Hall Pirates

Senior career*
Years	Team	Apps	(Gls)
2014	New York Red Bulls U-23	13	(13)
2015	New York Red Bulls II	7	(0)
- * Club domestic league appearances and goals as of March 28, 2015 ‡ National team caps and goals as of January 19, 2014

Victor Manosalvas (born 14 December 1992) is an Ecuadorian professional footballer who plays as a midfielder.

== Career ==
=== Youth and college ===
Manosalvas played for the New York Red Bulls Academy since 2009. In 2009, he was a member of the U-18 squad and was named Academy Player of the Year. Manosalvas also played college soccer for Seton Hall University from 2010 to 2014. While with the Pirates he played in 59 matches scoring 7 goals and recording 10 assists.

During the 2014 season Manosalvas played for the New York Red Bulls U-23 in the National Premier Soccer League. He helped lead the team in capturing the 2014 NPSL title and was recognized as the league player of the year and top scorer.

=== Professional ===
Manosalvas signed with New York Red Bulls II for the 2015 season and made his debut as a starter for the side in its first ever match on March 28, 2015, in a 0–0 draw with Rochester Rhinos. On July 18, 2015, Manosalvas recorded his first assist for the club in a 2–0 victory over Harrisburg City Islanders.

=== International ===
In 2006 Manosalvas represented Ecuador at the U-15 national team level.
