= Sacramento Gold FC =

Sacramento Gold
- Full name: Sacramento Gold Football Club
- Nickname: The Gold
- Founded: 2009; 17 years ago
- Stadium: Capital Christian School; Sacramento, California
- Owner: John Nunan
- Head Coach: Ruben Mora Jr.
- League: National Premier Soccer League, Golden Gate Conference
- 2019: Golden Gate Conference: 4th Playoffs: DNQ
- Website: goldfc.org
Home colors

Sacramento Gold Football Club is an American professional soccer team based in Sacramento, California, United States. Founded in 2009, the team plays in National Premier Soccer League (NPSL), an American professional soccer league at the third tier of the American soccer pyramid, in the West Region, Golden Gate Conference.

The team plays its home games in the stadium at Capital Christian School, where they have played since 2017. Previously, they played in the stadium at River City High School. The team's colors are burgundy, navy blue, and white.

== History ==
The Gold began play in the NPSL during the 2010 season, finishing first within the Northwest Division in regular season before eventually winning the playoff title. After beating FC Sonic Lehigh Valley in the semifinal, the team went on to defeat Chattanooga FC, 3–1, in the National Championship.

Since its founding, Sacramento has qualified for two U.S. Open Cup tournaments in 2013 and 2016 respectively. In its first ever tournament game, the Gold held a two-goal lead over United Soccer League side Portland Timbers 2 before eventually losing, 3–2. Three years later a hat-trick by Manolo Piña earned Sacramento its first U.S. Open Cup victory when it defeated the Premier Developmental League's Burlingame Dragons FC, 3–0, on May 11, 2016. The team fell to local qualifier La Máquina FC in the next round.

== Year-by-year ==
| Year | League | Regular season | Playoffs | U.S. Open Cup |
|---|---|---|---|---|
| 2010 | NPSL | 1st, Northwest | National Champion | Qualifying Semifinal |
| 2011 | NPSL | 2nd, West-Northwest | Divisional Final | did not qualify |
| 2012 | NPSL | 3rd, West-Northern | did not qualify | did not qualify |
| 2013 | NPSL | 2nd, West-Northern | West Region Final | First round |
| 2014 | NPSL | 1st, Golden Gate | National Semifinal | Qualifying first round |
| 2015 | NPSL | 2nd, Golden Gate | West Region Final | Qualifying first round |
| 2016 | NPSL | 4th, Golden Gate | did not qualify | Second round |
| 2017 | NPSL | 3rd, Golden Gate | did not qualify | did not qualify |
| 2018 | NPSL | 8th, Golden Gate | did not qualify | did not qualify |
| 2019 | NPSL | 4th, Golden Gate | did not qualify | did not qualify |
| 2020 | NPSL | Season cancelled due to COVID-19 pandemic | | |
| 2022 | NPSL | 1st, Golden Gate | Lost West Region Final | did not qualify |
| 2023 | NPSL | 5th, Golden Gate | Eliminated in the West Region Quarter Finals | Eliminated second round |
| 2024 | NPSL | 4th, Golden Gate | Eliminated in West Region Semi Finals | did not qualify |

== Honors ==
- National Premier Soccer League
  - Winners: 2010
- Western Regional Champs (Playoff NPSL):
  - Winners: 2010, 2014
- Northwest Division (NPSL):
  - Winners: 2010
- Golden Gate Conference (NPSL):
  - Winners: 2014

== Head coaches ==
- (Mexico) Ruben Mora Jr. (2011, 2012, 2014, 2015–present)
- (United States) Rick Caldwell (2010, 2013)

== Players ==
See Category:Sacramento Gold FC players

== Stadiums ==
- Stadium at River City High School; West Sacramento, California (2010–2016)
- Stadium at Capital Christian School; Sacramento, California (2017–present)
