= FC Force =

- Founded: 2014
- Ground: Central Union HS Stadium
- Capacity: 2,000
- President: Alfredo Marcq
- Head Coach: Diego Terry
- League: National Premier Soccer League
- 2014: 1st, Southwest; Playoffs: Regional semifinals
- Website: http://www.fcforcesoccer.net
Home colors	Away colors

FC Force is an American soccer club based in Bonita, California. The team plays in the National Premier Soccer League, the fourth tier of the American soccer pyramid. The team colors are navy blue, yellow and gray.

== History ==
FC Force was admitted to the National Premier Soccer League on January 21, 2014. They will be playing in the Southwestern Conference of the NPSL West Region.

FC Force won the West Region's Southwest Conference in their first year. They lost 5–2 to the Sacramento Gold in the NPSL Regional semifinals.

== Year-by-year ==
Year	Division	League	Regular season	Playoffs	Open Cup
2014	4	NPSL	1st, Southwest	Regional semifinals	Did not qualify

== Staff ==
- Alfredo Marcq Sr. - Owner
- Alfredo Marcq Jr. - President
- Jorge Zavala - General Manager
- Diego Lucas Terry - Head Coach
- Sergio Villalva - Assistant Coach
- Lorenzo Vazquez - Goalkeeper Coach

== Stadiums ==
- Southwest High School, El Centro, California (2014)
- Holtville High School, Holtville, California (2014)
- Calexico High School, Calexico, California (2014)
- Central Union High School, El Centro, California (2015–present)
