= BCS Clash =

- Full name: BCS Clash
- Founded: 2013
- Ground: Allen Academy Stadium; Bryan, TX
- Capacity: 1,000
- Owners: Sonny Dalesandro & Dr. Thomas J. Kern
- Head Coach: Vacant
- League: National Premier Soccer League
- Website: http://bcsclash.com

BCS Clash is an American amateur soccer club based in Bryan, Texas which began play in the NPSL in 2014. The club plays in the South Central Conference of the South Region. BCS Clash is led by David Gutierrez, Alfonso Colins, Chris Lehr, and Doug Kent. Gutierrez serves as owner and head coach with Collins, an employee of the Houston Dynamo, and others leading the front office.

== Stadium ==
The team plays on the campus of Allen Academy Stadium in Bryan, Texas. The facility has an AstroTurf field and seating for over 1,000.
