= Inter United FC =

- Full name: Inter United FC
- Founded: 2008
- Ground: Werner L. Neudorf Stadium; Tukwila, WA
- Capacity: 3,000
- Owner: Nasir Tura
- Head Coach: Scott Elston
- League: National Premier Soccer League
- Website: http://www.interunitedfc.com/

Inter United FC was a short-lived American amateur soccer club based in Tukwila, Washington. The team competed in the National Premier Soccer League for one season in 2014 as a founding member of the Northwest Conference. Inter United FC was led by Nasir Tura, a varsity soccer coach at Foster High School in Tukwila and director of the Seattle Community Cup.

== Stadium ==
The team played at Werner L. Neudorf Stadium in Tukwila, Washington. The facility, which was built in 2002, features an artificial playing surface and seating for 3,000 fans.
