= International Portland Select FC =

- Full name: International Portland Select Football Club
- Short name: IPS FC
- Founded: 1996; 30 years ago
- Manager: Harvey Hurst
- League: United Premier Soccer League
- Website: http://www.ipsfc.com/

International Portland Select Football Club is a semi-professional soccer club based in Portland, Oregon playing in the United Premier Soccer League.

== History ==
IPSFC was founded in 1996 by Patrick Kirk, Raymond Oniel and Jerry Fay.

They participated in the OPSL (Oregon Premier Soccer League) from 1996 to 2018 winning 11 league championships a league record.

In 2020 IPSFC joined the NPSL having the franchise transferred from Sergio Medel owner/Manager of NPSL team FC Mulhouse

== Year-by-year ==
Year	League	Regular season	Playoffs	U.S. Open Cup	Notes
2014	NPSL	1st, Northwest Conference	Regional semifinal	Golden Gate/Northwest Conference Qualifying Playoff	Lost to Sonoma County Sol in the West Region Semifinal
2015	NPSL	2nd, Northwest Conference	did not qualify	Northwest Conference Qualifying Final	
2016	NPSL	2nd, Northwest Conference	did not qualify	did not qualify	
2017	NPSL	2nd, Northwest Conference	West Region first round	did not qualify	Lost to Kitsap SC in the West Region First round
2018	NPSL	2nd, Northwest Conference	National semifinal	did not qualify	Lost to FC Motown in the national semifinal
2019	NPSL	4th, Northwest Conference	did not qualify	First round	
2020	NPSL	Season cancelled due to COVID-19 pandemic			

== Honors ==
National Premier Soccer League

- Northwest Conference Champions: 2014
- West Region Champions: 2018
