= John Kowalski =

Polish football manager

Personal information
- Date of birth: December 22, 1951 (age 74)
- Place of birth: Miłków, Poland

College career
Years	Team	Apps	(Gls)
1969–1972	New Haven Chargers		

Managerial career
- 1978–1979: Cincinnati Kids
- 1979–1980: Pittsburgh Spirit
- 1980–1981: Hartford Hellions
- 1981–1985: Pittsburgh Spirit
- 1989–1996: Robert Morris Colonials (men)
- 1991: United States (interim)
- 1993–1994: United States U20
- 1997–1998: Tampa Bay Mutiny
- 1999–2000: Pittsburgh Riverhounds
- 2001–2019: Robert Morris Colonials (women)

John Kowalski (born December 22, 1951, in Miłków, Poland) is a former coach of the professional United States soccer clubs Tampa Bay Mutiny (Major League Soccer), Pittsburgh Riverhounds (NASL) and Pittsburgh Spirit (MISL). He also briefly managed the United States national team in 1991, compiling a 2–0–1 record.

Kowalski was also the head coach of the 1989 and 1992 U.S. five-a-side (Futsal) teams which won a bronze medal in the Netherlands in 1989 and a silver medal in Hong Kong in 1992. Since the Futsal World Championship is a FIFA sanctioned event, the 1992 silver medal is the highest medal achievement the United States men's team has accomplished in FIFA worldwide soccer competition. The 1989 bronze was the first official U.S. medal in a FIFA world competition.

He also coached the Robert Morris University women's soccer team from 2001 until 2019. With the Colonials, he amassed a career 112–224–19 record, and guided RMU to their first ever Northeast Conference Tournament appearance. Kowalski is also the head coach of the Fort Pitt FC Regiment of the NPSL, and the U-14 Girls Stars United team, located in Pittsburgh, Pennsylvania.
