= Lehigh Valley United =

- Full name: Lehigh Valley United Sonic
- Nickname: Sonic
- Founded: 2009; 17 years ago
- Stadium: Rocco Calvo Field at Moravian College in Bethlehem, Pennsylvania
- Owner: Soccer Association of the Lehigh Valley
- President: Matt McTish
- Head Coach: Andrew Adlard
- League: USL League Two
- 2024: 6th, Mid Atlantic Division; Playoffs: DNQ
- Website: lehighvalleyunited.com
Home colors	Away colors

Lehigh Valley United (also referred to as LVU) is an American soccer team based in Bethlehem, Pennsylvania. Founded in 2009, the team plays in USL League Two, the fourth tier of the American Soccer Pyramid.

The team plays its home games at Rocco Calvo Field on the campus of Moravian College. The team's colors are navy blue and white.

== History ==
Lehigh Valley United was founded in 2009 by the non-profit organization Soccer Association of the Lehigh Valley (SALV) to field a top-level team in the National Premier Soccer League, considered the fourth division of the American soccer pyramid and roughly equal to the USL Premier Development League, while also supporting youth development and coaching.

The team originally took its name from its youth club affiliate, FC Lehigh Valley United, and adopted "Sonic" from a corporate partnership with American restaurant chain, Sonic Drive-In, in a deal that lasted three seasons. This was also reflected in the club's logo, which was changed following the conclusion of the deal in 2012. The team shares its history and many former players with the successful Pennsylvania Stoners team, which won the NPSL Championship in 2008 but left the league at the end of the 2009 season.

The Sonic had a successful first season, finishing first in Northeast Division/Keystone Conference and making it to the national semi-finals in the playoffs. Following a second place divisional finish in 2011, the club returned to first place in 2012 and defeated Chattanooga FC 1-0 in the National Championship game on July 29, 2012, winning their first league title. Since 2010, Sonic has posted a remarkable league and playoff record of 46 Wins, 4 draws, and 7 Losses. In 2013, Sonic represented the NPSL in US Soccer's Inaugural Amateur National Championship. After beating the Croatian Eagles (WI) in the national semi-final (1-0) Sonic then played the Carolina Dynamo (PDL) in the final losing 3-1 in penalty kicks (1-1 regulation)

FC Lehigh Valley United Sonic joined the USL PDL on November 18, 2014.

== Year-by-year ==
Year	Level	League	Regular season	Playoffs	U.S. Open Cup
FC Lehigh Valley Sonic
2010	4	NPSL	1st, Keystone 12W-1D-2L	National Semi Finals	did not enter
2011	4	NPSL	2nd, Keystone 9W-2D-1L	did not qualify	did not qualify
2012	4	NPSL	1st, Keystone 14W-1D-1L	Champions	First Round
FC Lehigh Valley
2013	4	NPSL	2nd, Keystone 11W-0D-3L	National Semi Finals	First Round
2014	4	NPSL	2nd, Keystone 8W-2D-2L	Northeast Region Semi Finals	Second Round
2015	4	USL PDL	10th, Mid-Atlantic 1W-1D-12L	did not qualify	did not qualify
2016	4	USL PDL	6th, Mid-Atlantic 3W-1D-10L	did not qualify	did not qualify
Lehigh Valley United
2017	4	USL PDL	6th, Mid-Atlantic 4W-1D-9L	did not qualify	did not qualify
2018	4	USL PDL	7th, Mid-Atlantic 1W-1D-12L	did not qualify	did not qualify
2019	4	USL League Two	6th, Mid-Atlantic 4W-3D-7L	did not qualify	did not qualify
2020	Season cancelled due to COVID-19 pandemic				
2021	4	USL League Two	6th, Mid-Atlantic 3W-1D-10L	did not qualify	did not qualify
2022	4	USL League Two	6th, Mid-Atlantic 1W-1D-12L	did not qualify	did not qualify
2023	4	USL League Two	6th, Mid-Atlantic 1W-3D-10L	did not qualify	did not qualify
2024	4	USL League Two	6th, Mid-Atlantic 1W-2D-9L	did not qualify	did not qualify
2025	4	USL League Two	6th, Mid-Atlantic 2W-3D-7L	did not qualify	did not qualify
2026	4	USL League Two	2nd, Mid-Atlantic 10W-2D-2L	TBA	did not qualify

== Honors ==
=== Domestic ===
- National Premier Soccer League
  - National Champions (1): 2012 (Also, 2008 Champions as PA Stoners)
- Keystone Division Titles (NPSL):
  - Winners (2): 2010, 2012,
- Northeast Conference Champions (3):
  - 2010, 2012, 2013

== Stadium ==
- Ulrich Sports Complex at Lehigh University, Bethlehem, Pennsylvania (2010–2012)
- Whitehall High School Sports Complex, Whitehall High School, Whitehall Township, Pennsylvania (2013–present)
