= East Bay FC Stompers =

American soccer club

- Full name: East Bay Football Club Stompers
- Nickname: Stompers
- Founded: 2012; 13 years ago
- Stadium: Raimondi Park
- Capacity: 2,000
- Owner: William P. Forte
- Head coach: Martin Sierra
- League: National Premier Soccer League
- 2016: 3rd, Golden Gate Conference; Playoffs: Qualified
- Website: http://www.ebfcstompers.com
Home colors	Away colors

East Bay FC Stompers is an American soccer club currently playing in the National Premier Soccer League. Founded in 2012 in San Francisco as San Francisco Stompers Football Club, since the 2016 season it has been based in Hayward, California. The team competed in the West Region – Golden Gate Conference, from 2012 to 2019, when they stopped active competition.

== Year-by-year ==
Season	Div.	League	Regular season	Tms.	Pos.	Playoffs	Open Cup
2012	4	NPSL	West Region – Northern Conference	6	5th	did not qualify	did not qualify
2013	4	NPSL	West Region – Northern Division	5	5th	did not qualify	did not qualify
2014	4	NPSL	West Region – Golden Gate Conference	5	5th	did not qualify	did not qualify
2015	4	NPSL	West Region – Golden Gate Conference	5	5th	did not qualify	did not qualify
2016	4	NPSL	West Region – Golden Gate Conference	5	3rd	West Region 1st Round	did not qualify
2017	4	NPSL	West Region – Golden Gate Conference	5	4th	did not qualify	did not qualify
2018	4	NPSL	West Region – Golden Gate Conference	8	4th	did not qualify	did not qualify
2019	4	NPSL	West Region – Golden Gate Conference	8	7th	did not qualify	did not qualify

== Stadiums ==
- Terra Nova High School Stadium (Pacifica, CA)
  2012: 5 games
- Kezar Stadium (San Francisco, CA)
  2012: 2 games, 2014: 1 game
- Boxer Stadium (San Francisco, CA)
  2013 season, 2014: 1 game, 2015: 3 games
- Lowell High School Stadium (San Francisco, CA)
  2014: 4 games, 2015: 3 games
- Pioneer Stadium (Hayward, CA)
  2016-2018 season

== Coaches ==
- Martin Sierra, head coach
- William Forte, general manager
- David Mahabali, manager
- Alex Ortega, assistant
- Lewis Saxelby, assistant
