= Seattle Sporting FC =

- Full name: Seattle Sporting FC
- Founded: 2013
- Ground: Pop Keeney Stadium - Bothell, WA
- Capacity: 4,500
- Owners: Victor Perez
- Head Coach: Hugo Alcaraz-Cuellar
- League: National Premier Soccer League
- Website: http://www.seattlesportingfc.com

Seattle Sporting FC is an American amateur soccer club based in Seattle, Washington, who began plan in the NPSL in 2014. The team held a name-the-team contest. They finished 2nd out of four teams in the Northwest conference their first year of play. Since then they have become an indoor soccer club.
