= San Diego Boca F.C. =

San Diego Boca FC
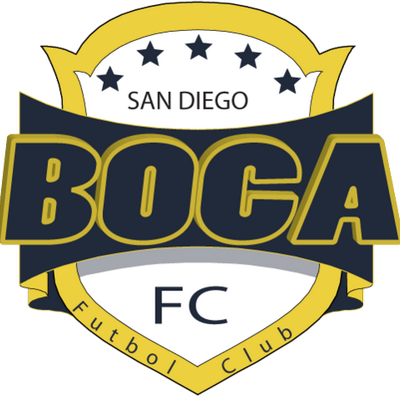
- Full name: San Diego Boca Football Club
- Dissolved: 2014
- League: NPSL

San Diego Boca Football Club was an American soccer team based in San Diego, California, United States. Founded in 2009, the team played in National Premier Soccer League (NPSL), a national amateur league at the fourth tier of the American soccer pyramid, in the Northwest Division. In 2014, the club was renamed FC Force and dissolved at the end of the season.

The team played its home games at Balboa Stadium and Torero Stadium.

The San Diego Derby was an annual contest that developed between San Diego Boca and their crosstown rivals San Diego Flash.
