= Tim Wittman =

American soccer player and coach

Personal information
- Date of birth: July 6, 1963 (age 63)
- Place of birth: Baltimore, Maryland, United States
- Height: 5 ft 7 in (1.70 m)
- Position: Defender

Youth career
- 1979–1980: Calvert Hall Cardinals

Senior career*
Years	Team	Apps	(Gls)
1981–1991	Baltimore Blast (indoor)	332	(168)
1991–1992	San Diego Sockers (indoor)	40	(25)
1992–1995	Baltimore Spirit (indoor)	76	(75)
1995	Pittsburgh Stingers (indoor)	23	(9)
1996	Detroit Neon (indoor)	24	(12)
2004–2005	Baltimore Blast (indoor)	4	(0)
Total		1000	(289)

Managerial career
- 2002–2003: Baltimore Blast (assistant)
- 2003–2006: Baltimore Blast
- 2008–: Johns Hopkins Blue Jays (assistant)
- * Club domestic league appearances and goals

Tim Wittman is a retired American soccer player who is currently the assistant coach with the Johns Hopkins University women's soccer team. He spent his entire professional career playing indoor soccer in the first and second Major Indoor Soccer League, National Professional Soccer League and Continental Indoor Soccer League. He also coached in the Major Indoor Soccer League.

== Player ==
Wittman attended Calvert Hall College High School where he was a 1980 All American high school soccer player. In December 1980 the Tampa Bay Rowdies drafted him in the third round of the NASL draft, but he never played for them. In 1981, the Baltimore Blast of the Major Indoor Soccer League drafted Wittman. He would spend ten seasons with the Blast before moving to the San Diego Sockers in 1991. He returned to Baltimore in 1992 to play for the Baltimore Spirit of the National Professional Soccer League. The Spirit released him in May 1995. On June 17, 1995, the Seattle SeaDogs selected Wittman with their second pick of the Continental Indoor Soccer League draft. On June 21, 1995, the SeaDogs traded Wittman to the Pittsburgh Stingers in exchange for Troy Fabiano and several 1995 and 1996 draft choices. In August 1995, he was suspended by the league after a physical altercation with a referee. He returned to the CISL in 1996, this time with the Detroit Neon. Wittman was inducted into the Maryland Soccer Hall of Fame in 2004.

== Coach ==
On December 22, 2002, the Blast hired Wittman as an assistant coach. He became the head coach a year later. On March 18, 2006, Wittman assaulted a referee during a game against the California Cougars. He was arrested and charged with battery. On April 24, 2006, MISL suspended Wittman from the league for two years. In 2008, he joined the Johns Hopkins University women's soccer team as an assistant coach.
