= New York Red Bulls U-23 =

- Full name: New York Red Bulls U-23
- Nickname: Little Reds
- Founded: 2009; 17 years ago
- Stadium: Red Bull Training Facility
- Owner: Red Bull GmbH
- Head Coach: Rob Elliott
- League: USL League Two
- 2021: 3rd, Metropolitan Division; Playoffs: Conference Quarterfinals
- Website: newyorkredbulls.com/youth
Home colors	Away colors

The New York Red Bulls U-23 is an American soccer team based in Harrison, New Jersey. Founded in 2009, the team plays in USL League Two, a national amateur league at the fourth tier of the American Soccer Pyramid. It is part of the official Development Academy of Major League Soccer's New York Red Bulls.

The team plays its home games at the Red Bull Training Facility in Hanover, New Jersey. The team's colors are red, blue and white.

== History ==
=== 2009–2013 ===
The New York Red Bulls U-23 team was formed in 2009 by Major League Soccer team New York Red Bulls. The team is the senior club in the New York Red Bulls Academy system.

The New York Red Bulls U-23 first entered National Premier Soccer League play in 2010. In its first season, the team finished first in the Atlantic Conference, but lost to FC Sonic Lehigh Valley in the playoffs.

=== 2014 ===
After a perfect 12–0 regular season, New York Red Bulls U-23 defeated two Northeast Region opponents to earn their spot in the NPSL Final Four. A 2–0 victory over Lansing United in the semifinals earned a place in the NPSL Final, where they defeated Chattanooga FC 3–1 at Red Bull Arena winning the 2014 NPSL Championship.

== Year-by-year ==
Year	Division	League	Regular season	W-D-L	Playoffs	U.S. Open Cup
2010	4	NPSL	1st, Atlantic	10–1–1	Atlantic Conference Final	did not enter
2011	4	NPSL	3rd, Atlantic	4–3–3	did not qualify	did not enter
2012	4	NPSL	1st, Atlantic	11–0–1	Atlantic Conference Final	did not enter
2013	4	NPSL	2nd, Atlantic	7–2–1	Northeast Region Semifinals	First Round
2014	4	NPSL	1st, North Atlantic	12–0–0	NPSL Champions	Second Round
2015	4	PDL	1st, Mid Atlantic	9–3–2	Championship Final	did not enter
2016	4	PDL	4th, Mid Atlantic	6–4–4	did not qualify	First Round
2017	4	PDL	1st, Mid Atlantic	12–1–1	Divisional Playoff	did not qualify
2018	4	PDL	2nd, Mid Atlantic	10–1–3	Conference Final	First Round
2019	4	USL League Two	4th, Mid Atlantic	5–6–3	did not qualify	Second Round
2020	4	USL League Two	Season cancelled due to COVID-19 pandemic.			did not qualify
2021	4	USL League Two	3rd, Metropolitan	7–4–3	Conference Quarterfinals	did not qualify

== Honors ==
=== Domestic ===
- Premier Development League
  - Runner-Up: 2015
- PDL Regular Season
  - Winner: 2017
- Eastern Conference
  - Winner: 2015
- Mid-Atlantic Division
  - Winner: 2015, 2017
- National Premier Soccer League
  - Champions: 2014
- Northeast Region
  - Winner: 2014
- North Atlantic Conference:
  - Winner: 2010, 2012, 2014

== Head coaches ==
- (United States) Bob Montgomery (2010–2012)
- (England) Simon Nee (2013–2014)
- (United States) Rob Elliott (2015–present)

== Stadium ==
- Lubetkin Field at J. Malcolm Simon Stadium at New Jersey Institute of Technology; Newark, New Jersey (2010–2013)
- Red Bull Training Facility; Hanover, New Jersey (2014–present)
  - MSU Soccer Park at Pittser Field at Montclair State University; Montclair, New Jersey (2017–present; select games)
