= Gorge FC =

- Full name: Gorge FC
- Founded: 2014
- Ground: Columbia Gorge Community College Stadium; Hood River/The Dalles, Oregon
- Capacity: ~1,000
- League: National Premier Soccer League
- West Region-Golden Gate Division
- Website: http://www.gorgefc.com

Gorge FC is an amateur soccer team based out of Hood River, Oregon. They started playing in the National Premier Soccer League in 2014. They will play in the Golden Gate Division of the West Region. The Gorge FC's team owner is Roger Sherrell.

== History ==
The team was founded in 2013 and known as SO Samba FC. They began to play at Columbia Gorge Community College in Hood River.
