= Foster High School (Tukwila, Washington) =

Location
- 4242 S. 144th Street; Tukwila, Washington 98168; United States; 47°28′30″N 122°16′49″W

Information
- Type: Public
- Established: 1915; 111 years ago
- School district: Tukwila School District
- NCES District ID: 530813001341
- Principal: LaTanya Parker
- Enrollment: 893 (2023-2024)
- Colors: Purple and White
- Mascot: Bulldog
- Alumni: Allan Ekberg
- Website: foster.tukwilaschools.org

Foster High School is a public high school located in Tukwila, Washington. It serves students from 9th grade to 12th grade. It is part of the Tukwila School District, one of the most diverse school districts in the nation. This is a small school district with about 3000 students, and is the only high school in the district.

== Demographics ==
Foster High School is one of the most diverse comprehensive high schools in the United States, having seen an influx of refugees settle in Tukwila since the mid 1990s. As of January 2017 the school had students from 51 nations, speaking 44 different languages at home. English was the most common home language, at approximately 42%, followed by Spanish (16%) Vietnamese (7%), Nepali (5%), Somali (5%) and Burmese (5%).

== Second Chance breakfast program ==
All Foster High School students have the option of a free breakfast either before school or between their first two classes. The Second Chance breakfast program was initially introduced in December 2017 as a pilot program, and won the United States Department of Agriculture Breakfast Champions Food Service Award for Innovation in March 2018. More than half of the school's students were participating in the program by May 2018.

Washington State school districts with 70% or more of their students eligible for free or reduced-price lunch programs must implement an alternate breakfast program by the 2019 school year. Nearly 75% of Foster High School students are eligible for free or reduced-price lunches in 2015–16.
