= Quad City Eagles =

- Full name: Quad City Eagles Football Club
- Nickname: Eagles
- Founded: 2010
- Ground: Lucken Field, Rock Island, Illinois
- Capacity: 5,000
- Head Coach: (United States) Scott Mejia
- League: National Premier Soccer League
- 2013: 1st, Central Division; Playoffs: TBD
- Website: http://www.quadcityeaglesfc.com/
Home colors	Away colors

Quad City Eagles is an American soccer team based in Moline, Illinois, United States and whose home pitch is in Rock Island, Illinois. Founded in 2010, the team made its debut in the Midwest Division of the National Premier Soccer League (NPSL), the fourth tier of the American Soccer Pyramid, in 2011. The club left the NPSL following the 2014 season.

== Year-by-year ==
Year	Division	League	Regular season	Playoffs	Open Cup
2011	4	NPSL	2nd, Midwest	Did not qualify	Did not enter
2012	4	NPSL	3rd, Midwest-Central	Did not qualify	Did not qualify
2013	4	NPSL	1st, Midwest-Central	Regional Finals	Did not qualify
2014	4	NPSL	1st, Midwest-Central	Qualified	Did not qualify

== Head coaches ==
- (United States) Scott Mejia (2011–present)

== Assistant coaches ==
- (England) Jon Mannall (2011–present)
- (England) Michael Regan (2012–present)
- (United States) Lucas Zicher (2012–present)
