= Pocono Snow =

- Full name: Pocono Snow
- Nickname: The Snow
- Founded: 2008
- Dissolved: 2014
- Ground: Eiler-Martin Stadium; East Stroudsburg, Pennsylvania
- Capacity: 5,000
- League: National Premier Soccer League
- 2013: 9th, Keystone Conference; Playoffs: DNQ
Home colours	Away colours	Third colours

Pocono Snow was an American soccer team based in East Stroudsburg, Pennsylvania, United States. Founded in 2008, the team plays in the National Premier Soccer League (NPSL), a national amateur league at the fourth tier of the American Soccer Pyramid, in the Northeast Keystone Division.

The team plays its home games at Eiler-Martin Stadium on the campus of East Stroudsburg University, where they have played since 2009. The team's colors are orange, blue, and white.

== History ==
The team was founded in 2008 and ceased operation as of 2014.

== Year-by-year ==
Year	Division	League	Regular season	Playoffs	Open Cup
2009	4	NPSL	5th, Keystone	Did not qualify	Did not enter
2010	4	NPSL	5th, Keystone	Did not qualify	Did not enter
2011	4	NPSL	6th, Keystone	Did not qualify	Did not enter
2012	4	NPSL	6th, Keystone	Did not qualify	Did not enter
2013	4	NPSL	9th, Keystone	Did not qualify	Did not enter

== Head coaches ==
- (Trinidad and Tobago) Anthony Creece (2009)
- (United States) James Ellison (2010)
- (Zambia) Winga Siwale (2011–present)

== Stadia ==
- Eiler-Martin Stadium at East Stroudsburg University; East Stroudsburg, Pennsylvania (2009–present)
