= FC Hasental =

- Full name: Football Club Hasental
- Nickname: Los Conejos (The Rabbits)
- Founded: 2005
- Ground: Oak Park High School Stadium
- Capacity: 5,000
- Head Coach: Eric Warner Bergman
- League: National Premier Soccer League
- 2015: 4th, West-Southwest
- Website: http://fchasental.sportngin.com
Home colors	Away colors

FC Hasental is an American soccer team based in Thousand Oaks, California, United States. Founded in 2005, the team plays in the Southwest Division of the National Premier Soccer League (NPSL), the fourth tier of the American Soccer Pyramid.

The team plays its home games in various stadiums in the Conejo and Simi Valleys. The team's colors are orange, light blue and white.

FC Hasental also has youth teams. FC Hasental (Youth) started in the year 2012.

== History ==
FC Hasental was established in 2005, as an amateur club, based in the Conejo Valley of Southern California. The founders agreed on the name "Football Club Hasental" in honor of their European roots. Hasental translates from German to English as Hare-Valley, also known as Conejo Valley. FC Hasental was founded by Gerd Kleemann, Eric Warner, Justin Carpenter, and Robbert-Jan Matthee.

FC Hasental began playing in the USASA-affiliated La Gran Liga de Oxnard in 2005/06, where they lost to Royal Puma FC in the Semi Finals. The following year they finished the season in second position, losing in the first round of the playoffs to CFA United. In the 2007/08 season Hasental entered the Tri-County Soccer League (TCSL), where they won the league cup with a 5-1 Victory over CSC76 Wanderers (Rovers). The following season Hasental introduced their reserve team, who won the TCSL League Championship, beating cup holders Crown & Anchor Lions with a 1–1 draw in May 2009.

FC Hasental's reserve team won the TCSL Charity Shield in 2009/10, but relinquished their hold of the League Cup. The club entered the Lamar Hunt US Open Cup in 2009 and 2010, through the Region IV USASA qualification tournament, but failed to qualify on both occasions.

Also in 2010, Hasental enjoyed victories over Hollywood United, Orange County Blue Star, Los Angeles Blues and PSA Elite, and tied 1–1 with Major League Soccer side Chivas USA, while the Hasental U23's lost 5–0 to the same Chivas USA team, and lost to the Maryland Bays in the U23 National Championship semi finals, in Overland Park, Kansas.

== Players ==
Note: Flags indicate national team as defined under FIFA eligibility rules; some limited exceptions apply. Players may hold more than one non-FIFA nationality.

No.	Pos.	Nation	Player فيصل عبدالجواد🇸🇦
1	GK	MEX	Gil Aguire
2	MF	USA	Ruben Rodriguez
3	DF	USA	Jeffrey Quijano
4	DF	USA	Greg Folk
5	DF	USA	Edgar Ramirez
6	MF	USA	Jordan Palmer
7	MF	USA	Jonathan Zerah
8	DF	USA	Robert Pate
9	FW	USA	William Velasquez
10	MF	PER	Milan Radovic

No.	Pos.	Nation	Player
11	FW	GBR	Sam McNutt
12	MF	USA	Nick Ladesma
13	FW	USA	Reggie Edu
14	FW	USA	Alberto Anguiano
15	FW	USA	Armando Gaitan
17	DF	ROU	Leu Lucian
18	FW	USA	Omar de la Piedra
36	MF	USA	Agustine Cezarez
—	FW	POL	Serguey Dovecky
—	GK	USA	Diego Adame
—	MF	USA	Taylor Canel

== Notable former players ==
Note: Flags indicate national team as defined under FIFA eligibility rules; some limited exceptions apply. Players may hold more than one non-FIFA nationality.

No.	Pos.	Nation	Player
—	MF	USA	Rafael Garcia
—	MF	USA	Agustin Cazarez
—	GK	MEX	Diego Quaresma
—	FW	FRA	Joris Fougerat
—		USA	Kyle Matthews

== Year-by-year ==
Year	Division	League	Regular season	Playoffs	Open Cup
2009	5	USASA			Did not qualify
2010	5	USASA			Did not qualify
2011	4	NPSL	3rd, Southwest	Did not qualify	Did not qualify
2012	4	NPSL	5th, Southwest	Did not qualify	Did not qualify
2013	4	NPSL	1st, West-Southern	Conference Semi-Finals	1st Round
2014	4	NPSL	2nd, Southwest	West Region Playoffs	Did not qualify
2015	4	NPSL	4th, Southwest	Did not qualify	Did not qualify

== Head coaches ==
- (United States) Eric Warner Bergman (2011–present)

== Stadia ==
- Stadium at Calabasas High School; Calabasas, California (2011)
- Stadium at Oxnard College; Oxnard, California (2011) 1 game
- Rancho Santa Susana Community Park; Simi Valley, California (2012)
- Lancer Stadium at Thousand Oaks High School; Thousand Oaks, California (2014)
- Rancho Madera Community Park; Simi Valley, California (2015)
- Eagle Stadium at Oak Park High School; Oak Park, California (2013-)
- William Rolland Stadium at California Lutheran University; Thousand Oaks, California (2012-2013, 2016-)
- Mt Clef Stadium at California Lutheran University; Thousand Oaks, California (2013,2016-)

== Average attendance ==
Attendance stats are calculated by averaging each team's self-reported home attendances from the historical match archive at https://web.archive.org/web/20100105175057/http://www.uslsoccer.com/history/index_E.html.

- 2011: to be announced
