= Real San Jose =

- Full name: Real San Jose
- Nickname: RSJ
- Founded: 2007; 19 years ago
- Ground: PAL Stadium; San Jose, California
- Capacity: 5,000
- Owner: SoccerMagic.com LLC
- Manager: Nick Arellano
- League: National Premier Soccer League Regional
- Website: realsanjose.net
Home colors	Away colors

Real San Jose is an American soccer team based in San Jose, California, United States. Founded in 2007, the team competes in the National Premier Soccer League (NPSL).

The team plays its home games at PAL Stadium, where they relocated in 2016. The team's colors are red, white, black; and blue, gold, and white.

== History ==
Real San Jose alternate logo

RSJ was formed in 2007 as a member of the NPSL.

In 2013, the NPSL crafted an award in memory of Alexander Arellano. Alex, the middle son of Real San Jose owner Nick Arellano, died in 2012 at the age of 25. The award goes to the NPSL's top coach of the year. Since Real San Jose moved to the UPSL the award is now given to the "Best RSJ Teammate" of the year.

After ten years of competing in the NPSL, the club made the switch to the UPSL in 2017. In 2020, RSJ moved to the National Soccer League. In 2024 RSJ once again showed leadership in the soccer community and founded the NPSL's Regional Division. In 2025 RSJ returned to the NPSL Tier 1.

== Year-by-year ==
Year	League	Regular season	Playoffs	Open Cup
2007	NPSL	5th, Northwest	Did not qualify	Did not qualify
2008	NPSL	3rd, Northwest	Did not qualify	Did not qualify
2009	NPSL	5th, Western	Did not qualify	Did not enter
2010	NPSL	2nd, Northwest	Conference Semifinal	Did not qualify
2011	NPSL	5th, West-Northern	Did not qualify	Did not qualify
2012	NPSL	4th, West-Northern	Did not qualify	Did not qualify
2013	NPSL	3rd, West-Northern	Did not qualify	Did not qualify
2014	NPSL	4th, Golden Gate	Did not qualify	Did not qualify
2015	NPSL	4th, Golden Gate	Did not qualify	Did not qualify
2016	NPSL	5th, Golden Gate	Did not qualify	Did not qualify
2017 - Spring	UPSL	4th, Northwest	Conference semi-final	Did not qualify
2017 - Fall	UPSL	2nd, Wild West	National semi-final	Did not qualify
2018 - Spring	UPSL	5th, Wild West, South	Did not qualify	Did not qualify
2018 - Fall	UPSL	5th, Wild West, South	Did not qualify	Did not qualify
2019 - Spring	UPSL	8th, Wild West	Conference Quarter-Finals	Did not qualify
2019 - Fall	UPSL	4th, Wild West, South	Did not qualify	Did not qualify
2021	NSL	8th, Pacific Conference	Quarter-Finals	Did not qualify
2021-22 Season 1	NSL	6th, Pacific Conference	Quarter-Finals	Did not qualify
2021-22 Season 2	NSL	3rd, Pacific Conference	Semi-Finals	Did not qualify
2023 Season	NSL	1st, Pacific Conference	Semi-Finals	Did not qualify
2024 Season	NSL	3rd, Pacific Conference	Semi-Finals	Did not qualify
2025 Season	NPSL	7th, Golden Gate Conference	Did not qualify	Did not qualify
2026 Season				2nd Qualifyimg Round

== Head coaches ==
- (United States) Nicholas Arellano (2007–2016, 2019–2020, 2024)
- (Germany) Markus Kothner (2017–2019)
- (England) Dave Gold (2021–2024)

== Stadium ==
- Yerba Buena High School; San Jose, California (2007–2013)
- Mount Pleasant High School; San Jose, California (2014–2015)
- PAL Stadium; San Jose, California (2016–present)
