= 2013 NPSL season =

National Premier Soccer League
- Season: 2013
- Champions: RVA Football Club (1st Title)
- Regular Season Champions: Detroit City FC (1st Title)
- Matches: 314
- Goals: 1,173 (3.74 per match)
- Best Player: (United States) Ross Middlemiss (Sonoma County Sol)
- Biggest home win: FC Hasental 13, LV Stallions 0 (April 6)
- Biggest away win: San Diego Flash 5, LV Stallions 0 (April 27)
- Highest attendance: Tulsa Athletics 3,261

The 2013 NPSL season was the 101st season of FIFA-sanctioned soccer in the United States, and the 11th season of the National Premier Soccer League. The season began in May 2013. FC Sonic Lehigh Valley were the defending champions, having won their first NPSL title the previous season. The league held their Annual General Managers meeting (AGM) during the weekend of the NASL Soccer Bowl in Atlanta in November.

== Format ==
=== Summary of Regions and Conferences ===
Region / Conference	Clubs
Northeast - Atlantic	Brooklyn Italians, New York Athletic Club, New York Red Bulls, Rhode Island Reds F.C., Seacoast United Mariners, Seacoast United Phantoms
Northeast - Keystone	Buxmont Torch FC, Clarkstown SC Eagles, FC Reading Revolution, FC Lehigh Valley United, Greater Binghamton FC, Hershey FC, Junior Lone Star FC, Morris County Colonials, Pocono Snow
South - Mid-Atlantic	CASL Elite, Chesterfield United FC, DC United Academy U23, Myrtle Beach FC, RVA Football Club
South - Sunshine	Cape Coral Hurricanes, Georgia Revolution, Jacksonville United, Miami United, Tampa Marauders FC
South - Southeast	Chattanooga FC, Knoxville Force, Mississippi Storm, New Orleans Jesters, Gulf Coast Texans, Rocket City United
South - South Central	Houston Hurricanes FC, Liverpool Warriors, Regals SCA, Tulsa Athletics
Midwest - Great Lakes	AFC Cleveland, Detroit City FC, Erie Admirals S.C., FC Buffalo, FC Sparta Michigan, Zanesville Athletic FC
Midwest - Central	Eau Claire Aris FC, Madison 56ers, Milwaukee Bavarians, Minnesota TwinStars FC, Quad City Eagles
West - Southwest	FC Hasental, FC Santa Clarita, Las Vegas Stallions, Orange County Pateadores FC, San Diego Boca FC, San Diego Flash
West - Golden Gate	CD Aguiluchos USA, Real San Jose, Sacramento Gold, San Francisco Stompers FC, Sonoma County Sol

Locations of NPSL clubs for 2013. Blue = Northeast Region clubs, Orange = South Region clubs, Green = Midwest Region clubs, Red = West Region clubs

== Changes from 2012 ==
The following changes regarding team relocation, rebranding, or expansion are effective for the 2013 NPSL season:

=== Return from Hiatus ===
Team name	Metro area	Location
FC Reading Revolution	Reading, PA	Reading, PA

=== New Teams ===
Team name	Metro area	Location	Previous affiliation
Cape Coral Hurricanes	Cape Coral, FL	Cape Coral, FL	Expansion Team
CASL Elite	Raleigh, NC	Raleigh, NC	Expansion Team
CD Aguiluchos USA	Oakland, CA	Stockton, CA	Expansion Team
Chesterfield United FC	Chesterfield, VA	Chesterfield, VA	Expansion Team
Clarkstown SC Eagles	Clarkstown, NY	Clarkstown, NY	Relocated and rebranded from Jersey City Eagles
DC United Academy U23	Washington, D.C.	Fairfax County, VA	Expansion Team
FC Sparta Michigan	Detroit, MI	Berkley, MI	Expansion Team
Gulf Coast Texans	Pensacola, FL	Pensacola, FL	Expansion Team
Hershey FC	Hershey, PA	Hershey, PA	Expansion Team
Houston Hurricanes FC	Houston, TX	Houston, TX	Relocated Team
Las Vegas Stallions	Las Vegas, NV	Las Vegas, NV	Expansion Team
Liverpool Warriors	Dallas, TX	Plano, TX	Expansion Team
Miami United	Miami, FL	Miami, FL	Expansion Team
New Orleans Jesters	New Orleans, LA	New Orleans, LA	USL PDL
Orange County Pateadores FC	Fullerton, CA	Fullerton, CA	Expansion Team
Regals SCA	Houston, TX	Houston, TX	Expansion Team
RVA Football Club	Richmond, VA	Richmond, VA	Expansion Team
Tampa Marauders FC	Tampa, FL	Tampa, FL	Expansion Team
Tulsa Athletics	Tulsa, OK	Tulsa, OK	Expansion Team
Zanesville Athletic FC	Zanesville, OH	Zanesville, OH	Expansion Team

=== Withdrew ===
Team name	Metro area	Location	Reason
AC Crusaders	Atlantic County area	Egg Harbor Township, NJ	Folded
Atlanta Silverbacks Reserves	Atlanta metropolitan area	Atlanta, Georgia	On Hiatus
Bay Area Ambassadors	San Francisco Bay area	Hayward, CA	Folded
Fullerton Rangers	Anaheim, CA	Fullerton, CA	Withdrew
FC New York	New York City	Queens, New York	Folded
Mass United FC	Boston	Lynn, Massachusetts	On Hiatus
Phoenix Monsoon	Phoenix, AZ	San Tan Valley, Arizona	Folded
North Coast Tsunami	Humboldt County, California	Eureka, CA	Withdrew

== Standings ==
As of 7/14/13

Key to colours in group tables
2013 Division Title
2013 Playoff Team

=== Northeast Region ===
==== Atlantic Division ====
Place	Team	GP	W	T	L	GF	GA	GD	P
1	Brooklyn Italians	10	7	2	1	22	8	+14	23
2	New York Red Bulls NPSL	10	7	2	1	25	9	+16	23
3	New York Athletic Club	10	5	2	3	16	10	+6	17
4	Seacoast United Mariners	10	3	2	5	12	21	-9	11
5	Rhode Island Reds	10	1	2	7	9	20	-11	5
6	Seacoast United Phantoms	10	1	2	7	7	23	-16	5

==== Keystone Conference ====
- Play-offs structure determined by Winning percentage (PCT) instead of Points (P)

Place	Team	GP	W	T	L	GF	GA	GD	P	PCT
1	Greater Binghamton FC	12	9	2	1	35	11	+24	29	0.833
2	FC Sonic Lehigh Valley	12	9	0	3	29	11	+18	27	0.750
3	Clarkstown SC Eagles	11	6	2	3	30	7	+23	20	0.636
4	Junior Lone Star FC	11	6	1	4	22	17	+5	19	0.591
5	Hershey FC	12	5	2	5	20	27	-7	17	0.500
6	FC Reading Revolution	12	4	3	5	23	25	-2	15	0.458
7	Morris County Colonials	11	3	1	7	15	41	-26	10	0.350
8	Buxmont Torch FC	11	1	3	7	12	27	-15	6	0.227
9	Pocono Snow	12	1	2	9	12	32	-20	5	0.167

=== South Region ===
==== Mid-Atlantic Division ====
Place	Team	GP	W	T	L	GF	GA	GD	P
1	RVA Football Club	8	6	2	0	23	8	+15	20
2	Myrtle Beach FC	8	4	1	3	19	11	+8	13
3	DC United Academy U23	8	4	1	3	17	15	+2	13
4	Chesterfield United FC	8	2	2	4	12	19	-7	8
5	CASL Elite	8	0	2	6	6	24	-18	2

==== Southeast Division ====
Place	Team	GP	W	T	L	GF	GA	GD	P
1	Chattanooga FC	10	6	3	1	18	4	+14	21
2	Gulf Coast Texans	10	5	3	2	16	7	+9	18
3	Rocket City United	10	4	4	2	20	18	+2	16
4	New Orleans Jesters	10	4	2	4	15	15	0	14
5	Knoxville Force	10	1	5	4	10	17	-7	8
6	Mississippi Storm	10	1	1	8	16	34	-18	4

==== Sunshine Division ====
Place	Team	GP	W	T	L	GF	GA	GD	P
1	Jacksonville United	8	6	2	0	20	7	+13	20
2	Georgia Revolution	8	4	2	2	22	10	+12	14
3	Miami United	8	3	2	3	11	14	-3	11
4	Tampa Marauders	8	2	3	3	5	8	-3	9
5	Cape Coral Hurricanes	8	0	1	7	3	22	-19	1

==== South Central Division ====
Place	Team	GP	W	T	L	GF	GA	GD	P
1	Tulsa Athletics	12	10	2	0	44	9	+35	32
2	Liverpool Warriors	12	6	4	2	36	12	+24	22
3	Regals SCA	12	2	1	9	15	50	-35	7
4	Houston Hurricanes FC	12	1	3	8	10	34	-24	6

=== Midwest Region ===
==== Central Division ====
Place	Team	GP	W	T	L	GF	GA	GD	P
1	Quad City Eagles	12	9	1	2	35	16	+19	28
2	Milwaukee Bavarians	12	8	1	3	29	14	+15	25
3	Madison 56ers	12	6	3	3	26	12	+14	21
4	Minnesota Twin Stars	12	2	1	9	19	42	-23	7
5	Eau Claire Aris FC	12	1	2	9	15	40	-25	5

==== Great Lakes Division ====
Place	Team	GP	W	T	L	GF	GA	GD	P
1	Detroit City FC	12	11	1	0	35	8	+27	34
2	FC Buffalo	12	8	0	4	21	14	+7	24
3	Erie Admirals S.C.	12	6	3	3	26	15	+11	21
4	AFC Cleveland	12	3	3	6	22	23	-1	12
5	FC Sparta Michigan	12	2	2	8	10	34	-24	8
6	Zanesville Athletic FC	12	1	1	10	12	32	-20	4

=== West Region ===
==== Southern Division ====
Place	Team	GP	W	T	L	GF	GA	GD	P
1	FC Hasental	14	10	3	1	48	17	+31	33
2	San Diego Flash	14	7	4	3	38	19	+19	25
3	FC Santa Clarita	14	7	3	4	26	22	+4	24
4	Orange County Pateadores FC	14	5	2	7	27	29	-2	17
5	San Diego Boca	14	3	3	8	25	36	-11	12
6	Las Vegas Stallions	14	2	1	11	16	57	-41	7

==== Northern Division ====
Place	Team	GP	W	T	L	GF	GA	GD	P
1	Sonoma County Sol	12	9	3	0	39	18	+21	30
2	Sacramento Gold	12	7	3	2	28	22	+6	24
3	Real San Jose	12	4	4	4	21	20	+1	16
4	CD Aguiluchos USA	12	3	3	6	19	23	-4	12
5	San Francisco Stompers	12	0	1	11	9	33	-24	1

== Playoffs ==
=== Format ===
Northeast Region
The top two finishers in the Keystone and Atlantic Divisions play in a crossover playoff.

South Region
Each Division Champion

Midwest Region - Great Lakes Division
Top four teams are playing in a playoff tournament.

Midwest Region
Central Division Champion and Great Lakes Division playoff tournament winner.

West Region
The top two finishers in the Northern and Southern Divisions play in a crossover playoff.

=== Northeast Region ===
July 17, 2013
8:00 PM EDT

Brooklyn Italians	1 – 2	FC Sonic Lehigh Valley

Aviator Sports Complex
Brooklyn, New York

July 18, 2013
6:00 PM EDT

Greater Binghamton FC	2 – 1	New York Red Bulls NPSL
Thompson 11'; Budnjo 44'	Report	Harr 45+'

Greater Binghamton Sports Complex
Binghamton, New York

July 21, 2013
6:00 PM EDT

Greater Binghamton FC	0 – 1	FC Sonic Lehigh Valley
	Report	Dotzman 57'

Greater Binghamton Sports Complex
Binghamton, New York
Attendance: 1,000

=== South Region ===
July 13, 2013
8:00pm EDT

RVA Football Club	5 – 3	Jacksonville United
Belmar 5'; Rendon 12'; Grant 84'; Hanley 86'; Bolt 89' (o.g.)	Report; Report	Safi 4'; Krizanovic 15'; Glenn 42'

Sports Backers Stadium
Richmond, Virginia

July 13, 2013
7:30pm CDT

Tulsa Athletics	0 – 0 (a.e.t.)	Chattanooga FC
	Report; Report
Penalties
Penalty missed	0 – 3	(penalty scored) Ferraz; (penalty scored) Stewart; (penalty scored) Charmey

Drillers Stadium
Tulsa, Oklahoma

July 21, 2013
7:00pm EDT

RVA Football Club	1 – 0	Chattanooga FC
Grant 50'	Report

Sports Backers Stadium
Richmond, Virginia

=== Midwest-Great Lakes Playoffs ===
July 13, 2013
5:00 PM EDT

Detroit City FC	3 – 1	AFC Cleveland
Taylor 36' (pen.); Myers 48'; Cameron 72'	Report	Bell 60' (pen.)

Cass Technical High School Stadium
Detroit, MI
Attendance: 2,634

July 13, 2013
7:30 PM EDT

FC Buffalo	2 – 5	Erie Admirals S.C.
Mort 58' 90'	Report; Report	Howard 16' 41'; Deakin 69'; Colton 74'; Jones 83'

Cass Technical High School Stadium
Detroit, MI

July 14, 2013
3:00 PM EDT

Detroit City FC	1 - 4	Erie Admirals S.C.
Myers 45'	Report; Report	Deakin 23'; Colton 54'; Jones 67' 71'

Cass Technical High School Stadium
Detroit, MI
Attendance: 2,181

=== Midwest Region Final ===
July 20, 2013
6:00 PM CDT

Quad City Eagles	0 – 1	Erie Admirals S.C.
	Report	Latifi 33'

Pleasant Valley High School
Riverdale, Iowa

=== West Region ===
July 13, 2013
5:30pm PDT

FC Hasental	5 – 8	Sacramento Gold

Calabasas High School
Calabasas, California

July 13, 2013
7:00pm PDT

Sonoma County Sol	3 – 0	San Diego Flash
Daly 40'; Spann 44'; Middlemiss 50'

Rancho Cotate High School
Rohnert Park, California

July 20, 2013
7:00pm PDT

Sonoma County Sol	3 – 1 (a.e.t.)	Sacramento Gold
Madu 15' (o.g.); Frame 97'; Taufer 103'		Fonseca 7'

Rancho Cotate High School
Rohnert Park, California
Attendance: 1,000

== NPSL Championship ==
=== Semi-finals ===
July 27, 2013
7:30 PM EDT

RVA Football Club	4 – 0	Erie Admirals S.C.
Belmar 51', 72'; Grant 57'; Daniels 90+'

Sports Backers Stadium
Richmond, Virginia

July 27, 2013
7:00 PM PDT

Sonoma County Sol	3 – 2	FC Sonic Lehigh Valley
Hurst 23'; Plummer 48' (o.g.); Varnadore 89'	Report	Cannon 18'; Gonzalez 67' (pen.)

Rancho Cotate High School
Rohnert Park, California
Attendance: 800

=== NPSL Championship Game ===
August 4, 2013
7:00 PM EDT

RVA Football Club	2 – 0	Sonoma County Sol
Grant 18'; Bel 88'	Report

Sports Backers Stadium
Richmond, Virginia
Attendance: 1,496
