= Binghamton Tiger Cats =

- Founded: October 2008
- League: WSFL
- Team history: Binghamton Tiger Cats (WFA) (2009); Binghamton Tiger Cats (IWFL) (2010); Binghamton Tiger Cats (Independent) (2011); Binghamton Tiger Cats (WSFL) (2012-2014)
- Based in: Upstate New York / Northern Pennsylvania
- Stadium: Endless Mountains Sports Complex (Towanda, Pennsylvania)
- Colors: Red, Black, White
- President: Don Dunbar, Jr.
- Head coach: Don Dunbar, Sr.
- General manager: Jennifer Weeks
- Championships: 1
- Mascot: Tiger Cat

The Binghamton Tiger Cats played their sixth season overall and fourth as a member of the Women's Spring Football League (WSFL) in 2014. The Tiger Cats Women's Tackle Football team based in Binghamton, New York began play for its inaugural 2009 season as a member of the Women's Football Alliance and for the 2010 season as a member of the Independent Women's Football League. The Tiger Cats competed as an independent team in 2011. The Tiger Cats completed the 2013 season as the WSFL Northeast Division Champions in the 8 man division and were also a WSFL National Championship Runner-Up.

The Tiger Cats are the first women's football team representing Binghamton and the Southern Tier, NY & Northern Pennsylvania region, preceding the WFA's Southern Tier Spitfire(Defunct) by one season. The Spitfire ceased operations after only one (2010) season. The Tiger Cats are the longest operating Women's football team in the history of Upstate New York & Northern Pennsylvania. The team is also the 2nd longest operating team in all of New York State with only the Brooklyn-based NY Sharks being in existence longer.

Home games for the 2009 season were played at the Greater Binghamton Sports Complex, making the Tiger Cats the first women's football team ever to have an indoor venue. For the 2010 IWFL season and the 2011 Independent season the Tiger Cats played at Binghamton Alumni Stadium. During the 2012,2013,2014 WSFL seasons the Tiger Cats played their Home games at the Endless Mountains Sports Complex in Towanda, Pennsylvania which is widely regarded as the best facility in 8-man football. The Tiger Cats hosted the 2012 WSFL's Inaugural 8 & 11 man divisions National Championship Games on August 11, 2012, also at Endless Mountains Stadium.

In their last regular season game of 2012 the Tiger Cats traveled to Portland, Maine and defeated the Maine Rebels by a score of 22-8 thus becoming the first team in WSFL history to defeat a team from the elite, long standing Independent Women's Football League (IWFL).

The team is presumably named after Canadian football's Hamilton Tiger-Cats, with likely inspiration from Binghamton University, whose sports teams are named the "Bearcats." The Lady Ti-Cats use a black and red winged football helmet similar to college football's Michigan Wolverines.

== Season-by-season ==
Season records
Season	W	L	T	Finish	Playoff results
Binghamton Tiger Cats (WFA)
2009	2	6	0	5th National Northeast	--
Binghamton Tiger Cats (IWFL2)
2010	0	8	0	8th Eastern Northeast	--
Binghamton Tiger Cats (Independent)
2011	6	4	0	--	--
Binghamton Tiger Cats (WSFL)
2012	4	4	0	3rd American Northeast	--
Binghamton Tiger Cats (W8FL)
2013	4	2	0	2nd League	Lost W8FL Championship (West Virginia)
2014	2	4	0	3rd League	Lost League Semifinal (West Virginia)
Totals	18	28	0		

== Roster ==
Binghamton Tiger Cats roster
Offensive Coordinator: Don Dunbar Sr.; Running backs: Don Dunbar Sr.; Wide receivers: Dave Fife; Offensive line: Pat Goodspeed; Quarterbacks: Jenn Weeks; General Manager: Jennifer Weeks	Defensive Coordinator: Pat Goodspeed; Defensive Line/Ends: Pat Goodspeed; Inside Linebackers: Don Dunbar Sr.; Outside Linebackers: Justin Landes; Special teams: Eddie Gaetano; W8FL League Contact: Don Dunbar Jr.	2014 TIGER CATS ROSTER 2014: Charity Bensley 70; Caroline Nelson 68; Des Lanphear 22; Steph Timchack 99; Brittany Landes 60; Jess Alexander 69; Jenn Hoch 32; Melinda Robinson 72; Mary Canfield 21; Erin Kuhlmeier 42; Jessi Middendorf 19; Pauline Greenblott 17; Denise Telfer 56	Injured Reserve: None; Sources: Roster as of 1 November 2010

== Season schedules ==
=== 2009 ===
Date	Opponent	Home/Away	Result
April 18	New Jersey Titans	Away	Lost 0-21
April 25	Keystone Assault	Home	Lost 20-34
May 9	Connecticut Cyclones	Home	Won 6-0**
May 16	New Jersey Titans	Home	Lost 6-26
May 30	Keystone Assault	Away	Lost 6-32
June 6	Connecticut Cyclones	Away	Won 6-0**
June 13	Baltimore Burn	Home	Lost 6-56
June 20	Philadelphia Liberty Belles	Away	Lost 0-53

** = Won by forfeit

=== 2010 ===
Date	Opponent	Home/Away	Result
April 3	Montreal Blitz	Home	Lost 0-76
April 10	Erie Illusion	Away	Lost 0-57
April 17	Erie Illusion	Home	Lost 0-55
April 24	Jersey Justice	Away	Lost 0-40
May 8	Jersey Justice	Home	Lost 0-38
May 15	Philadelphia Firebirds	Away	Lost 0-49
May 22	Jersey Justice	Away	Lost 8-38
June 5	Southern Maine Rebels	Home	Lost 8-21

=== 2011 ===
Date	Opponent	Home/Away	Result
April 9	Three Rivers Xplosion	Home	Won 40-12
April 16	Baltimore Burn	Home	Lost 0-22
April 23	Jersey Justice	Away	Lost 8-36
April 30	Three Rivers Xplosion	Away	Won 22-8
May 7	Bye		
May 14	Erie Illusion	Away	Lost 0-38
May 21	Jersey Justice	Home	Won 6-0 (Forfeit)
May 21	Three Rivers Xplosion	Home	Won 6-0 (Forfeit)
June 4	Baltimore Burn	Away	Lost 0-46
June 11	New England Nightmare	Home	Won 6-0 (Forfeit)
June 18	Three Rivers Xplosion	Home	Won 6-0 (Forfeit)

== 2012 schedule ==
Date	Opponent	Home/Away	Result
April 21	Baltimore Burn	Away	6-0 W*
April 28	Massachusetts Chaos	Home	30-0 W
May 5	Three Rivers Xplosion	Home	6-0 W*
May 12	New England Nightmare	Away	L
May 19	New Jersey Titans	Home	L
June 2	Baltimore Burn	Home	L
June 9	New Jersey Titans	Away	L
June 23	Maine Rebels	Away	22-8 W
