= Brendan Keyes =

Irish footballer and manager

Personal information
- Full name: Brendan Keyes
- Place of birth: Ireland
- Position: Forward
| 1986–1993 | Houston Eagles | 80 | (48) |
| 1995 | Houston Force | 1 | (0) |
| 1996–1998 | Houston Hurricanes | 38 | (14) |

Managerial career
- Years: Team
- 2010–2012: Galveston Pirate SC
- 2013–present: Houston Hurricanes FC
- 1992–present: Celtic FC America

Brendan Keyes is an Irish football manager and former player who currently owns and coaches Celtic FC America. Keyes also founded and operates the Texas Premier Soccer League.

== Football career ==
Keyes began his playing career as a youth in Ireland with Stella Maris F.C. and Home Farm F.C. In 1996 Keyes moved to Houston and joined the Houston Eagles. He would later play with the original Houston Hurricanes (USISL) in the 1990s.

== Football management ==
In July 2010 Keyes became owner of the Galveston Pirate SC, where he was already head coach and general manager. The team won the National Premier Soccer League South Central Division in 2012.

In 2013 he moved the team to Houston and renamed it Houston Hurricanes FC.

In January 2019 Keyes partnered with Alberto Escobar and Ricardo Alarcon to continue on in TPSL and grow the league throughout Texas. The TPSL is sanctioned by US Club soccer.

TPSL Announce C.F.C.A for upcoming 2019 season, source Houston Chronicle https://www.chron.com/neighborhood/bayarea/sports/article/Soccer-Celtic-FC-America-looks-to-find-permanent-14083160.php

== Season-by-season ==
| Year | Team | League or cup | Position | US Open Cup |
|---|---|---|---|---|
| 2010–11 | Galveston Pirates | SPSL | 3rd of 6 | |
| 2011–12 | Galveston Pirates | HFA | n/a | Qualifying Round |
| 2012 | Galveston Pirates | NPSL South Central | 1st of 7 | |
| 2013 | Houston Hurricanes | NPSL South Central | 4th of 4 | |
| 2013–14 | Houston Hurricanes | TPSL | 5th of 6 | |
| 2014–15 | Houston Hurricanes | TPSL | 1st of 6 | |
| 2015–16 | Houston Hurricanes | TPSL | 4th of 8 | |
| 2017–18 | Houston Hurricanes | TPSL | 2nd of 8 | |
| 2018–19 | Houston Hurricanes | TPSL | 1st of 6 | |
