= Seacoast United =

Seacoast United may refer to:

- Seacoast United Mariners, US soccer team based in Brunswick & Topsham, Maine
- Seacoast United Phantoms, US soccer team based in Portsmouth, New Hampshire
- Seacoast United Phantoms (NPSL), US soccer team based in Hampton, New Hampshire
