= Celtic FC America =

- Full name: Celtic FC America
- Nicknames: The Celts, The Bhoys, The Hoops
- Founded: December 2012; 13 years ago
- Dissolved: after 2020
- Ground: Clear Springs Stadium
- Capacity: 5,000
- Owner: Brendan Keyes
- Head Coach: Brendan Keyes
- League: Texas Premier Soccer League
- Website: https://www.celticfcamerica.com
Home colors	Away colors

Celtic FC America was an American soccer club based in Houston, Texas. Originally known as Houston Hurricanes FC, the club was established in December 1992 when owner Brendan Keyes announced he was moving his Galveston Pirate SC franchise to Houston. In 2019, Keyes decided to go back to his roots and use his academy team name Celtic FC America for his first team. As of 2024, the team is likely defunct.

The Celts' regular kit colors were green and white horizontally striped shirts with white shorts and socks which derive from the iconic Celtic F.C. of Glasgow, Scotland. CFCA play home games at Clear Springs Stadium in League City, Texas.

== History ==
=== National Premier Soccer League (NPSL) ===
On December 24, 2012, the National Premier Soccer League announced that Galveston Pirate SC team owner Brendan Keyes would relocate and re-brand his franchise for the 2013 NPSL season. The Pirates, who won the South Central Conference crown as an expansion team in 2012 will continue to play in local leagues and tournaments in Texas, while the first team Houston Hurricanes will take the place of the Galveston team in TPSL.

In the 1990s Keyes played for the Houston Hurricanes (USISL); his boyhood idol Bobby Lennox played for the NASL's Hurricane club in 1978-79, two factors that played into Keyes resurrecting the Hurricane brand. The move received the blessing of NPSL Chairman Andy Zorovich and former Hurricane owner Joey Serralta.

On the same day of the announcement of their relocation, the club also revealed their first player signing, which was 19-year-old Mercer University player Justin Ross. The Celts then held tryouts in order to fill the rest of their roster before their TPSL debut in May 2013. The Hurricanes finished the 2013 NPSL season in last place in the South Central Conference.

On November 11, 2013 owner Brendan Keyes announced that the club would not be participating in the NPSL the following season, instead focusing on growing the new TPSL.

=== Texas Premier Soccer League ===
In September 2013 the Hurricanes joined five other Texas-based clubs (BCS Bearkatz FC, Galveston Pirate SC, Houston Dutch Lions, Houston Leones FC, Houston Regals SCA) forming the new Texas Premier Soccer League.

On May 19, 2018 the Hurricanes FC captured their first Texas Cup defeating Twin Cities FC by a score of 3-2.

On January 26, 2019 Hurricanes FC officially rebranded as Celtic FC America. https://www.chron.com/neighborhood/bayarea/sports/article/Soccer-Celtic-FC-America-looks-to-find-permanent-14083160.php https://www.tpsl.us/celtic.html

By 2024, the website of the team was inactive and its social network accounts were shut down except an Instagram account which was last active in 2020.

== Season-by-season ==
Year	League	Position	Playoffs	Texas Cup	US Open Cup
2013	NPSL	4th of 4	DNQ	---	DNQ
2013–14	TPSL	5th of 6	DNQ	Runner-up	DNQ
2014–15	TPSL	1st of 6	Runner-up	5th	DNQ
2015–16	TPSL	4th of 8	Semifinalist	Runner-up	DNQ
2016–17	TPSL	2nd of 5	Semifinalist	Semifinalist	DNQ
2017–18	TPSL	2nd of 6	Runner-up	Champions	DNQ
2018-19	TPSL	1st of 4	Runner-up	Champions	DNQ

== Coaching staff ==
Position	Name	Nationality
Head coach	Brendan Keyes	(Republic of Ireland)
Assistant Coach	Gary Doherty	(Republic of Ireland)

== Notable players ==
- Paul Byrne
- Gary Doherty
- Evan Evimar Mariano
- Colville Richards
- Pratik Shinde
