= Baltimore Burn =

Women's American football team

- Founded: 2001
- League: NWFL/NWFA (2001–2008); WFA (2009–2010); WSFL (2011–2016); USWFL (2017–2018); WTFL (2020-)
- Team history: Baltimore Burn (2001–)
- Based in: Baltimore, Maryland
- Stadium: Utz Twardowicz field at Patterson Park
- Colors: Black, red, gold
- Owner: Debra Miller
- Championships: 1 (2011)

The Baltimore Burn is a Women's American football team that last played in the Women's Spring Football League in 2015. Formerly a member of the National Women's Football Association from 2001 to 2008 and the Women's Football Alliance from 2009 to 2010, they played in the Women's Spring Football League from 2011 to 2015. The Burn first played at Art Modell Field on the campus of Mergenthaler Vocational Technical Senior High School, but in 2013 they relocated to Utz Towardowizc field in Patterson Park.

In 2020 the team announced membership in the Women's Tackle Football League. Play was cancelled for the 2020 season due to the COVID-19 pandemic, but the league expects to play in 2021.

== Season-by-season ==
Season records
Season	W	L	T	Finish	Playoff results
Baltimore Burn (NWFL)
2001	0	7	0	5th Northern	–
2002	9	2	0	1st Mid-Atlantic	Lost League Quarterfinal (Philadelphia)
Baltimore Burn (NWFA)
2003	7	3	0	2nd Northern Mid-Atlantic	Lost Northern Conference Quarterfinal (Cleveland)
2004	4	4	0	3rd Northern Mid-Atlantic	–
2005	4	4	0	11th Northern	–
2006	4	4	0	2nd Northern North Atlantic	–
2007	4	5	0	1st Northern South	Lost Northern Conference Quarterfinal (West Michigan)
2008	2	6	0	3rd Northern East	–
Baltimore Burn (WFA)
2009	5	4	0	3rd National Northeast	–
2010	6	3	0	1st National East	Lost National Conference Quarterfinal (Columbus)
Baltimore Burn (WSFL)
2011	6	0	0	1st League	Declared WSFL Champions (based on regular season record)
2012	3	5	0	2nd American Northeast	Lost American Conference Semifinal (New Jersey)
2013	0	3	0	–	–
2014	1	4	0	2nd Eastern	Lost Eastern Conference Championship (Memphis)
2015	1	4	0	5th Northern	–
Totals	56	58	0	(including playoffs)	

== Season schedules ==
=== 2009 ===
Date	Opponent	Home/Away	Result
April 18	Connecticut Cyclones	Away	Won 6–0**
April 25	Philadelphia Liberty Belles	Home	Lost 8–43
May 9	Keystone Assault	Away	Won 20–16
May 16	Connecticut Cyclones	Home	Won 6–0**
May 30	Philadelphia Liberty Belles	Away	Lost 10–13
June 6	Keystone Assault	Home	Won 44–22
June 13	Binghamton Tiger Cats	Away	Won 72–0
June 20	New Jersey Titans	Home	Lost 0–6**

** = Game won by forfeit

=== 2010 ===
Date	Opponent	Home/Away	Result
April 10	New England Nightmare	Home	Won 54–14
April 17	New Jersey Titans	Away	Won 62–36
May 1	Philadelphia Liberty Belles	Away	Lost 26–6
May 15	Southern Tier Spitfire	Home	Won 6–0
May 22	Keystone Assault	Home	Lost 24–34
June 5	New England Nightmare	Away	Won 28–20
June 12	New Jersey Titans	Home	Won 16–0
June 19	Keystone Assault	Away	Won 36–24
Post-Season
June 26	Columbus Comets	Away	Lost 8–67

=== 2011 ===
Date	Opponent	Home/Away	Result
April 16	Binghamton Tiger Cats	Away	Won 22–0
April 23	Three Rivers Xplosion	Home	Won 48–6
April 30	New Jersey Justice	Away	Won 12–8
May 7	Steel City Renegades	Home	Won 6–0**
June 4	Binghamton Tiger Cats	Home	Won 48–0
June 11	Three Rivers Xplosion	Away	Won 54–0

** = Game won by forfeit
