= Charles Robertson =

Charles, Charlie or Chuck Robertson may refer to:

== Academics ==
- Charles Grant Robertson (1869–1948), British academic historian
- Charles Victor Robertson (1882–1951), New Zealand - Australian businessman, politician and educator
- Charles Martin Robertson (1911–2004), British classical scholar and poet

== Public officials ==
- Charles Robertson (British politician) (1874–1968), chair of London County Council
- Charles Robertson (Norwegian politician) (1875–1958), Norwegian Minister of Trade, 1926–1928
- Charles Alexander Robertson (died 1940), Canadian politician from Ontario
- Charles R. Robertson (1889–1951), American politician
- Charlie Robertson (mayor) (1934–2017), American politician and mayor of York, Pennsylvania
- Charles T. Robertson Jr. (born 1946), U.S. Air Force general

== Sports ==
- Charlie Robertson (1896–1984), American Major League Baseball pitcher
- Charlie Robertson (footballer) (1873–1940), Australian rules footballer
- Charlie Robertson (racing driver) (born 1997), British racing driver

== Others ==
- Charles Franklin Robertson (1835–1886), bishop of Missouri in the Episcopal Church
- Charles Robertson (English painter) (1844–1891), English painter and engraver
- Charles Robertson (Irish artist) (c. 1760–1821), Irish miniature-painter
- Charles Robertson (priest) (1873–Irish ), Anglican priest
- Charles Graham Robertson (1879–1954), English recipient of the Victoria Cross
- Charles Robertson (entomologist) (1858–1935), American entomologist
- Charles John Robertson (1798–1830), English botanical illustrator
- Chuck Robertson, lead singer of the ska punk band Mad Caddies

== Characters ==
- Charles Robertson (Green Wing)

== See also ==
- Robertson (surname)
- Charles Young (cricketer) (Charles Robertson Young, 1852–1913), English cricketer
- Robert Skene (polo player) (Charles Robertson Skene, 1914–1997), polo player
- Charles Robertson Maier (born 1945), Priory Historian for St John Ambulance, The Priory of Canada
- Charles Macleod-Robertson (1870–1951), British sailor
