= Temple United FC =

Temple United
- Full name: Temple United Football Club
- Founded: 11 March 2015
- Ground: Korompai Soccer Complex
- Owner: Jeremiah Connelly (United States)
- Manager: Lance Carlisle (United States)
- League: Texas Premier Soccer League
- Website: http://www.templeunitedfc.com
Home colors

Temple United FC are a men's amateur adult American soccer club based in Temple, Texas which debuted in the Texas Premier Soccer League (TPSL) in the season 2015/16.

The Temple playing uniform consists of a black shirt, white shorts and black socks, keeping with the club's monochrome theme. The club's crest was designed in part by club owner Jeremiah Connelly and the TPSL's Scottish Vice President Marc Roseblade.

== History ==
"To sum up what the owner wants to achieve with this club; to show the people of Temple the potential this city has and get people motivated to go out and seek their own endeavors so we can have a really nice place to call home, and hopefully still keep it the 6th lowest cost of living city in the US!

Temple United FC was brought about due to its proximity between the larger cities of Austin, San Antonio, Houston and Dallas, as its owner Jeremiah Connelly wanted the growth that the city of Temple has seen in recent years to serve as a catalyst for bringing a recognized men's adult team to the area. After seeing large amounts of population growth in the past few years, particularly in the West Temple area (with a population of about 70,000), he chose to implement a plan to bring a minor league soccer club into the city.

Soccer is a popular game in Temple, played by a mixture of both young and slightly older players, and Temple United FC used this as an opportunity as those players may be able to join the minor league team.

On March 11, 2015, owner Jeremiah Connelly joined TPSL League President Brendan Keyes and Temple, Texas city Mayor Danny Dunn to unveil the club crest at Lions Park Soccer Complex. On March 15, 2015, the club announced a series of 3 open tryouts to acquire the club's first players.

=== Kit Unveiling ===
On August 31, Temple United rolled out a promotional video with the launch of the club's first ever full black and white playing kit.

=== Texas Premier Soccer League ===
In September 2015, Temple United joined seven other clubs from across the state to begin the league's third season. Houston Hurricanes FC, Austin Real Cuauhtemoc and Twin Cities FC all remained from the previous season, with the other new clubs in the Texas Premier Soccer League being Austin Lonestrikers, Brownsville Bravos, San Antonio Generals and Dallas Clash.

The TPSL is sanctioned by US Club Soccer, an affiliate of the United States Soccer Federation (USSF) with the league being operated and managed solely by Brendan Keyes. Each team is owned and operated individually and are responsible for maintaining the league's minimum standards and for raising its own operating revenue.

== Year on Year ==
Year	League	Position	Playoffs	US Open Cup	Texas Cup
2015/16	TPSL	8th Place	DNQ	DNQ	

== Coaching staff ==
Position	Name	Nationality
Head coach	Lance Carlisle	(United States)

== Playing Venue ==
Temple currently play their home matches at Korompai Soccer Complex, 1909 Curtis B Elliott Dr, Temple, Texas 76501.
