= Stallion (disambiguation) =

A stallion is an adult male, ungelded horse.

Stallion may also refer to:

== Arts and entertainment ==
- Stallion (band), an American pop rock group
- The Stallion, a series of five songs appearing on the 2003 Ween album All Request Live and originally recorded across the albums The Pod, Pure Guava, Chocolate and Cheese and Craters of the Sac
- Stallion (Gobots), a figure in the Gobots toyline
- Stallion (Suikoden), a character in the Suikoden series of role-playing video games
- Stallion, an American gay-themed adult magazine

== In business ==
- Stallion Group, a Nigerian multinational conglomerate
- Stallion Bus and Transit Corp., an American bus manufacturer and distributor
- Stallion, South African name for the Toyota Kijang series of pickup trucks and minivans
- Stallion, South African name for the Toyota Stout light truck
- Stallion, code name for the HTC Inspire 4G smartphone
- ADI Stallion, an American home-built utility aircraft

== In the military ==
=== Aviation ===
- Helio Stallion, an American STOL utility aircraft
- Sikorsky CH-53 Sea Stallion, an American helicopter
- Sikorsky CH-53E Super Stallion, an American helicopter
- Sikorsky CH-53K Super Stallion, an American helicopter
- Stallion Army Airfield, a military airport in Socorro County, New Mexico

=== Other ===
- SS-N-16 Stallion, a Soviet anti-ship missile
- USS Stallion, two US Navy tugs
- Ashok Leyland Stallion, a range of trucks produced for the Indian Army

== Sports teams ==
=== United States ===
- Baltimore Stallions, a former Canadian Football League franchise based in Baltimore, Maryland
- Birmingham Stallions (1983–1986), a former United States Football League franchise based in Birmingham, Alabama
- Birmingham Stallions (2022), a United Football League franchise based in Birmingham, Alabama
- Bluegrass Stallions, a former American Basketball Association (2009–2010) and Premier Basketball League (2010–2011) team based in Lexington, Kentucky
- Boise Stallions (1999–2001), a former Indoor Professional Football League based in Boise, Idaho
- Buffalo Stallions (1979–1984), a former Major Indoor Soccer League team
- Dallas Stallions (1999), a former American professional roller hockey team based in Dallas, Texas
- Houston Stallions (2010–2012), a former indoor football team based in Houston, Texas
- Las Vegas Stallions, a former National Premier Soccer League team based in Las Vegas, Nevada, established in 2013
- New Jersey Stallions (1996–2004), a former team in the United Soccer Leagues, originally the New York/New Jersey Stallions
- North American Stallions, the sports teams of North American University, a private university in Stafford, Texas
- Oklahoma Stallions, an American Basketball Association team based in Oklahoma City, Oklahoma
- Salt Lake Stallions, a short-lived Alliance of American Football team in 2019
- Springfield Stallions (2006–2007), a former Continental Indoor Football League team based in Springfield, Illinois
- St. Louis Stallions, a proposed National Football League team to be located in St. Louis, Missouri
- Syracuse Stallions, a The Football League professional basketball team based in Syracuse, New York

=== Elsewhere ===
- Marconi Stallions FC, an Australian semi-professional association football club
- Brampton Stallions (2001–2006), a former Canadian Soccer League team
- Saskatoon Stallions, a Canadian minor league baseball team
- Doncaster Stallions (1969–1970), a defunct English motorcycle speedway team
- Northallerton Stallions, original name of the Catterick Crusaders, a rugby league team based in Catterick, North Yorkshire, England; also known as the North Yorkshire Stallions in 2011
- Coastal Stallions, a former Fijian rugby union team
- Waicoa Bay Stallions, a New Zealand rugby league team
- Sialkot Stallions, a cricket team based in Sialkot, Punjab, Pakistan
- Stallions (cricket team), a Pakistan Cricket Board team
- CDU Stallions, the sports teams of the Cebu Doctors' University in Mandaue, Philippines
- Stallion Laguna F.C., a Filipino association football club
- Jaffna Kings, formerly Jaffna Stallions, a Sri Lankan cricket team

== Other uses ==
- Curt Stallion and Stallion Rogers, ring names of American professional wrestler Camron Rogers (born 1990)

== See also ==
- Megan Thee Stallion, stage name of American rapper Megan Pete (born 1995)
- The Italian Stallion (disambiguation)
- The Young Stallions, former American professional wrestling tag-team
