= Christian Relief Fund =

US non-profit organization

- Abbreviation: CRF
- Founded: 1971
- Founder: Baxter Loe
- Location: Amarillo, Texas
- President: Milton Jones
- Website: christianrelieffund.org

Christian Relief Fund (CRF) is a non-profit organization in Amarillo, Texas, focused on bringing relief to orphans and children in poverty. Through child sponsorship and relief programs, CRF provides food, clean water, education, spiritual training, healthcare, and disaster relief worldwide.

== Mission ==
Christian Relief Fund is dedicated to the poverty ridden children's growth intellectually, physically, spiritually, and socially. In order to stay focused on their mission, CRF follows these four core values: Caring for Children, Committed to Christ, Working through Churches, and Operating with Authenticity.

== History ==
Baxter Loe, a businessman and preacher from Amarillo, Texas, went on a mission trip to India in 1970. While there, he met a man named John Abraham. John explained his country and people were suffering from poverty, and his own family was starving. Upon hearing John's situation, Baxter promised to provide help, but after returning to the United States, he was swept back into his daily routine. Some time later, Baxter remembered his promise to John and called for information on how to send him money. The only response he received was: "John Abraham is dead". After receiving this news, Baxter began supporting John Abraham's children, but he felt like this was not enough, so he found support for more children in India, Central American, Africa, and other countries all over the world. In 1971, Baxter founded Christian Relief Fund. Now, thousands of children across 30 different countries are supported by CRF sponsors.

In 2004, Jones was visiting with some children in the Nyalenda slum in Kisumu, Kenya, where they asked him if he would wear orange everyday, and he agreed. When he was promoted to CEO, he reinvented the organization by making orange their signature color. The organization uses this color to speak to renewed hope that will never be taken away.

== Programs ==
=== Child sponsorship ===
Through sponsoring, Christian Relief Fund is able to provide children with food, clothing, medical care, education, and Bible teaching. It cost $35 a month, and a sponsor receives a packet which includes their child's photo and story. Sponsors also have the opportunity to write their child letters.

=== Medical care ===
Through various medical clinics worldwide, CRF provides healthcare, and in many of these areas, the CRF clinics are the only healthcare available.

=== Clean water ===
A child in a family of four living in Sub-Saharan carries an average of 128 pounds of water daily, and one in ten of these people do not have access to clean water. Due to the need of retrieving water, children have little time to go to school. Through the use of CRF's water and sanitation programs, they provide clean water each year to tens of thousands of people.

=== Disaster relief ===
Christian Relief Fund assist victims of famine and disasters such as floods, earthquakes, tornadoes, wars, etc., throughout the United States and others worldwide. They give funds for food, blankets, shelter, medical assistance, and means to rebuild homes. Their disaster relief also includes shipments of sea containers that contain medical supplies for hospitals and orphanages in impoverished countries.

=== Education ===
CRF is trying to help children break the cycle of poverty by funding schools around the world. Without these schools, many of the students would not have the opportunity for an education. Their funding covers the cost of construction of the school buildings, the children's tuition, and the teachers' salaries.

== Publications ==
Christian Relief Fund releases posts regularly on their personal blog and sends out monthly newsletters via email and mail to all their sponsors and contributors.

== Financials ==
Charity Navigator gives Christian Relief Fund a four out of four stars rating. For 2015, Christian Relief Fund allocated $8,487,045 in contributions, gifts, grants, and other revenue as follows:

- Program expenses: 90.7%, $6,636,129
- Administrative expenses: 5.1%, $382,732
- Fundraising expenses: 4.0%, $283, 641

On Charity Navigator, Christian Relief Fund is said to have $5,378,631 in assets. In 2015, CRF's president, Milton Jones, received $75,836 in compensation, and the executive director, Linda Purdy received $72,637.
