= 2015–16 TPSL season =

Texas Premier Soccer League
- Season: 2015/16
- Champions: Te be decided
- Matches: 54
- Goals: 270 (5 per match)
- Top goalscorer: Blane Nauck 15 (Hurricanes)
- Biggest home win: 9-0. Hurricanes v Temple. Lonestrikers v Generals
- Biggest away win: 2-12. Temple v Lonestrikers
- Highest scoring: 2-12. Temple v Lonestrikers

The Texas Premier Soccer League (TPSL) is a men's outdoor soccer league that was formed in 2013 consisting of amateur soccer club sides across the state. 2015/16 will be the third full season of play for the league.

Five new clubs joined to play in the new 2015/16 season. Temple United FC, Brownsville Bravos FC, San Antonio Generals, Dallas Clash and Austin Lonestrikers. Galveston & Rancheros dropped out from the league after the conclusion of the 2014/15 season. Texas Timberz have taken a 1-year hiatus but will participate in the end of season US Club Soccer Texas State Cup.

== 2015/16 teams ==
Team	Joined TPSL	City	Venue	Website	President/Owner	Head coach
Houston Hurricanes FC	2013	Houston	Memorial Park, Houston	Hurricanes	(Republic of Ireland) Brendan Keyes	Brendan Keyes
Austin Real Cuahutemoc	2014	Austin, Texas	McMaster Athletics, Georgetown	ARC	Jose Bartolo	Jose Bartolo
Twin Cities FC	2014	Eagle Pass, Texas	Eagle Field, Eagle Pass	Twin Cities	Jesus Daniel Gonzalez	
Texas Timberz FC	2014	Diboll, Texas	Diboll Community Field	Timberz	Marco A Morales	Rodolfo Sanabria
Temple United FC	2015	Temple	Lions Park, Temple	Temple	(United States) Jeremiah Connolly	(United States) Lance Carlisle
Brownsville Bravos FC	2015	Brownsville	Oliveira Park, Brownsville	Bravos	J. Martin Vela	
San Antonio Generals	2015	San Antonio	Mission City Soccer Complex	Generals	Martin Sanchez	
Austin Lonestrikers	2015	Austin	McMaster Athletics, Georgetown	Lonestrikers	Gerardo Romero	
Dallas Clash	2015	Dallas	Trinity View Park, Irving	Clash	Raul Sevilla	

== Fixtures ==
=== Regular season results ===
Home \ Away	ARC	BRO	DAL	HOU	LON	SAG	TEM	TWN
ARC		3–3	1–1	3–2	5–4	3–0	3–0	1–2
Brownsville Bravos	3–2		4–2	0–1		3–2	3–0	0–1
Dallas Clash	1–0	3–0		3–0	2–2	7–0	5–1	2–1
Houston Hurricanes	3–2	3–4	2–3		3–1	3–0	9–0	3–3
Lonestrikers	0–1	3–1	2–3	3–3		9–0	7–0	0–2
San Antonio Generals	0–4	2–4	2–7	1–2	2–5		2–4	0–6
Temple United FC	0–5	1–2	0–6	1–5	2–12	1–5		0–3
Twin Cities	1–1	6–0		6–0	1–2	7–0	9–1	

Updated to match(es) played on February 20, 2016. Source:
Legend: Blue = home team win; Yellow = draw; Red = away team win.

=== Regular season standings ===
Pos	Team	Pld	W	L	D	GF	GA	GD	Pts
1	Dallas Clash	13	10	1	2	45	15	+30	32
2	Twin Cities	13	9	2	2	47	10	+37	29
3	ARC	14	7	4	3	35	20	+15	24
4	Hurricanes	14	7	5	2	39	30	+9	23
5	Bravos	13	7	5	1	27	29	−2	22
6	Lonestrikers	13	6	5	2	50	25	+25	20
7	Generals	14	1	13	0	16	64	−48	3
8	Temple	14	1	13	0	11	76	−65	3

=== Playoffs ===
Game	Date	Home	Result	Away
A		Seed 1		Seed 4
B		Seed 2		Seed 3

=== Championship final ===
Home	Result	Away
Winner Game A		Winner Game B

== Lamar Hunt U.S. Open Cup ==
Date	Round	Home	Result	Away
Nov 1	QR1	ARC	2-4	NTX Rayados

In season 2015/16, Austin Real Cuauhtemoc (ARC) entered qualification for the 2016 competition and played their match with NTX Rayados in Georgetown, Texas on November 1. The game ended in a 4–2 loss for the TPSL side.

== US Club Soccer Texas State Cup ==
=== Round 1 ===
Game	Date	Home	Result	Away
A	4/9	ARC	2-6	Temple United
B		Lonestrikers		Dallas Clash
C		Hurricanes		Twin Cities
D		Bravos		Generals

- Dates to be confirmed
