= Three Rivers Xplosion =

Women's American football team

- Founded: 2011
- League: Women's Spring Football League (2012–present)
- Team history: Three Rivers Xplosion (2011–present)
- Based in: Pittsburgh, Pennsylvania
- Arena: Quarry Field
- Colors: Red, black and white
- Head coach: Doc Creeley, Mike Dusch
- Championships: 0

The Three Rivers Xplosion is a women's football team based in South Side, Pennsylvania, a suburb of Pittsburgh. They are members of the Women's Spring Football League (WSFL) and was the first player-owned women's tackle football team in Pittsburgh. The team was founded and played their first season in 2011 as an independent team, then joined the WSFL for the 2012 season, where they finished 3–5 and won the Northeast 8-man Division title.

== Team ==
As a team in the WSFL, Xplosion is considered a semi-professional Women's American football team. While most teams in the WSFL are 11 player, there is also a division consisting of 8 player teams. Three Rivers Xplosion participates in the later division, having 8 players on the field during their games. They play the full-contact, tackle version of American football with rules similar to those in the NFL. Xplosion practices and plays their games at local South Side schools and stadiums, with one their frequently utilized facilities being Quarry Field.

The team may be labeled as semi-professional, but they play strictly for fun and the love of the game. The players do not receive any form of compensation, and their coaches volunteer their time. The team also does their part to reach out to the community for sponsors to help with the cost of equipment, facility rentals, and travel expenses.

== Members ==
=== Players ===
The players of Three Rivers Xplosion consist of a diverse group of women of a variety of ages and coming from many different backgrounds. Many of the players are mothers with children at home. Some of the professions current and former members of the team hold include, but are not limited to, student, teacher, athletic trainer, pastor, nurse, sales, archaeologist, accountant, engineer, doctor, bartender, a firefighter. Xplosion prides themselves on having a team oriented mindset and makes it a point to accept and value members of all backgrounds and levels of football experience.

The team's motto is "One Team, One Heart, One Mission".

=== Coaches ===
Robert Gold – Head coach; Chartiers Valley School District facilities manager

- Quote, when referring to coaching the team: "they've never had an opportunity to learn this game. You have to teach them how to crawl before you can teach them how to walk and run." But the women he coaches "are like sponges, they're eager to learn. They ask a lot of questions. They learn very quickly."
- Quote, when reflecting on their 2012 season: "We started finding our spark and the girls brought it together, they showed some pride."

Steve Riddle – Assistant coach

- Quote, when referring to the start up team: "It's like pee wee football, but their attitudes are great. They want to learn how to play."

James Creely – former coach of the South Side Sabers

Mike Dusch – former coach of the South Side Sabers

== Accomplishments ==
2012

- WSFL Champions
- 3 players participated in league All-Star Game

2013

- Offensive player makes WSFL All-Star Team
- Defensive player makes WSFL All-Star Team

== Recent news ==
According to Three Rivers Xplosion official Facebook page (as of February 2016) the WSFL disbanded, and they were looking to join a new league. In the meantime, they were planning to expand and rebuild their team. Women in the Pittsburgh area who are interested in playing football (no experience necessary) and getting involved in the program are encouraged to contact them (contact info on their Facebook page; link listed below in "External Links").

== 2012 schedule ==
Date	Opponent	Home/Away	Result
April 14	Mass Chaos	Home	36–12 W
April 21	Cape Fear Thunder	Away	30–0 L
April 28	Cape Fear Thunder	Home	36–6 L
June 2	West Virginia Wildfire	Away	50–6 L
June 23	Mass Chaos	Away	1–0 W*
July 7	West Virginia Wildfire	Home	40–0 L
July 21	Mass Chaos	Home	1–0 W*
July 28	West Virginia Wildfire	46–0 L	

*= Win by forfeit

== Season-by-season ==
Season records
Season	W	L	T	Finish	Playoff results
Three Rivers Xplosion (WSFL)
2011	0	8	0	Last Independent Division	
2012	3	5	0	1st Northeast 8-man division	
2013	0	6	0	Last 8-man division	
Totals	3	19	0		
