= New Jersey Titans =

Former American women's football team

- Founded: 2007
- League: WPFL (2007); NWFA (2008); WFA (2009-2010); WSFL (2012)
- Team history: New Jersey Titans (2007–2012)
- Based in: Belleville, New Jersey
- Stadium: Belleville Municipal Stadium
- Colors: Blue, silver, red
- Owner: Simone Edwards
- Head coach: Andy Davis
- Championships: 1

The New Jersey Titans were a team of the Women's Spring Football League (WSFL) 11-woman division. Originally based in Wayne, New Jersey, the Titans played their home games on the campus of Passaic County Technical Institute through the 2010 season. Upon their return for the 2012 season, the Titans relocated their home games to Belleville Municipal Stadium in Belleville, New Jersey.

Before joining the WSFL, the Titans played a season each in the now-defunct Women's Professional Football League and the National Women's Football Association, as well as two seasons in the Women's Football Alliance before taking the 2011 season off.

The Titans were owned by former Fairleigh Dickinson basketball player Simone Edwards, who also played on the team as a tight end and linebacker. Under her direction, the Titans won the WSFL title in 2012.

== Season-by-season ==
Season records
Season	W	L	T	Finish	Playoff results
New Jersey Titans (WPFL)
2007	4	2	0	2nd American East	—
New Jersey Titans (NWFA)
2008	3	5	0	2nd North East	—
New Jersey Titans (WFA)
2009	5	3	0	2nd National Northeast	—
2010	2	6	0	3rd National East	—
2011	Did not play				
New Jersey Titans (WSFL)
2012	8	1	0	1st Northeast	Won Northeast Division Championship; Won American Conference Championship; National Championship
Totals	22	17	0		

== Roster ==
New Jersey Titans Roster
52 Aja Henderson; 61 Tarah Alexis; 26 Stefanie Allen; 8 Kesha Champion; 10 Danielle Green; 41 Cynthia Hazel; 79 Telesha Huskey; 82 Kari McDonnell	7 Anabel Rodriguez; 13 Amy Leach; 24 Caniece Montague; 15 Erika Velez; 12 Robyn Burton; 20 Tye Wilson; 23 Yachira Contes; 87 Christie Pedone	94 Kelle Trabucco; 91 Jennifer Webb; 31 Redrick DiMarco; 44 Maria Javier; 58 Capri Darby; 99 Kie McCrae

== Season schedules and scores ==
=== 2009 ===
Date	Opponent	Home/Away	Result
April 18	Binghamton Tiger Cats	Home	Won 21–0
April 25	Connecticut Cyclones	Away	Won 6–0**
May 9	Philadelphia Liberty Belles	Home	Lost 12–14
May 16	Binghamton Tiger Cats	Away	Won 26–6
May 30	Connecticut Cyclones	Home	Won 6–0**
June 6	Philadelphia Liberty Belles	Away	Lost 0-59
June 13	Keystone Assault	Home	Lost 6-28
June 20	Baltimore Burn	Away	Won 6–0**

=== 2010 ===
Date	Opponent	Home/Away	Result
April 10	Keystone Assault	Home	Lost 16–30
April 17	Baltimore Burn	Home	Lost 36–62
May 1	Southern Tier Spitfire	Away	Won 47–2
May 8	Philadelphia Liberty Belles	Away	Lost 12–25
May 15	New England Nightmare	Home	Won 47–6
June 5	Keystone Assault	Away	Lost 8-28
June 12	Baltimore Burn	Away	Lost 0–16
June 19	Philadelphia Liberty Belles	Home	Lost 0-42

=== 2012 ===
Date	Opponent	Home/Away	Result
April 14	Baltimore Burn	Away	Lost 18–20
May 19	Binghamton Tiger Cats	Away	Won 59–0
June 2	Mass Chaos	Won **	
June 9	Binghamton Tiger Cats	Home	Won 46–8
June 30	Mass Chaos	Won **	
July 7	Baltimore Burn	Home	Won 37–8
July 21	Baltimore Burn (Northeast Division Championship)	Home	Won 31–6
July 28	Huntsville Tigers (American Conference Championship)	Home	Won 25–7
August 11	Dallas/FW Extreme (National Championship)	Away	Won 67–6

** = Game won by forfeit

== In the media ==
The team was featured on an episode of Style Network's reality show, Glam Fairy on January 8, 2012, called "Ghosts & Glamazons".
