= Philadelphia Liberty Belles =

Women's American football team

- Founded: 2009
- League: Women's Football Alliance
- Team history: Philadelphia Liberty Belles 2009-present
- Based in: Ambler, Pennsylvania
- Stadium: Wissahickon High School
- Colors: Red, white, blue
- President: Shaina Kirkendall & NaTaza Stanford
- Head coach: Bill Sytsma
- Championships: 0

The Philadelphia Liberty Belles are a team of the Women's Football Alliance which began play for its inaugural 2009 season. Home games are played on the campus of Wissahickon High School near Ambler, Pennsylvania.

The Liberty Belles are named in honor of a team which played in the National Women's Football Association and Independent Women's Football League from 2001 to 2004 (and in fact, won the NWFA's inaugural 2001 championship). Despite the namesake, there is no connection between the two teams and only one person related to this team from the original (Carol Grubb).

== Season-by-season ==
Season records
Season	W	L	T	Finish	Playoff results
2009	8	0	0	1st National Northeast	Won National Conference Semifinal (Indiana); Lost National Conference Championship (West Michigan)
2010	8	0	0	1st National Northeast	Won National Conference Quarterfinal (West Michigan); Lost National Conference Semifinal (Columbus)
2011	2	6	0	3rd National Northeast	--
2012*	1	2	0	3rd National Division 2	--
Totals	21	10	0	(including playoffs)	

* = current standing

== Roster ==
Philadelphia Liberty Belles roster
Quarterbacks: currently vacant; Running backs: currently vacant; Wide receivers: 1 Dawn Yergey; 37 Allison Jackson; 42 Jay Merkel; 47 Deborah Kappler	Offensive line: 66 Sara Landau; Defensive line: currently vacant; Linebackers: 2 Elizabeth Seiple	Defensive backs: currently vacant; Special teams: currently vacant; Multiple Positions: 10 Kimberly Colyar (WR/DB); 12 Brittanie Crockett (DB/RB); 18 Mikaelyn Austin (QB/P); 21 Christine Wilson (DB/WR); 24 Venita Williams (RB/DB); 27 Bridget Moran (TE/DE); 31 Aisha Davis (LB/RB); 32 Tiffany Shaw (DE/LB); 34 Laurie Fitzpatrick (RB/LB); 36 Danika Hopkins (DL/RB); 54 Jaliyla Muhammad (DE/RB); 60 Kate Dwyer (OL/DL); 69 Myisha Upshur (OL/DL); 70 Rasheena Burns (DL/OL); 74 Khalifah Bennett (OL/DL); 75 Laurionne Solomon (OL/DL); 76 NaTaza Stanford (OL/DL); 79 Tonya Pinones (OL/DL); 99 Victoria Villone (OL/DL)	Injured reserve: currently vacant; Exempt List: currently vacant; Practice squad: currently vacant; rookies in italics; Roster updated January 3, 2012; 24 Active, 0 Inactive, 0 PS

== 2009 ==
=== Season schedule ===
Date	Opponent	Home/Away	Result
April 18	Keystone Assault	Home	Won 47-24
April 25	Baltimore Burn	Away	Won 43-8
May 9	New Jersey Titans	Away	Won 14-12
May 16	Keystone Assault	Away	Won 14-12
May 30	Baltimore Burn	Home	Won 13-10
June 6	New Jersey Titans	Home	Won 59-0
June 13	Connecticut Cyclones	Away	Won 6-0
June 20	Binghamton Tiger Cats	Home	Won 53-0
July 11	Indiana Speed (National Conference Semifinal)	Home	Won 19-9
July 11	West Michigan Mayhem (National Conference Championship)	Away	Lost 21-28

== 2010 ==
=== Season schedule ===
Date	Opponent	Home/Away	Result
April 10	Southern Tier Spitfire	Away	Won 63-0
April 24	New England Nightmare	Away	Won 70-7
May 1	Baltimore Burn	Home	Won 26-6
May 8	New Jersey Titans	Home	Won 25-12
May 15	Keystone Assault	Away	Won 35-12
May 22	Southern Tier Spitfire	Home	Won 71-0
June 12	New England Nightmare	Home	Won 62-6
June 19	New Jersey Titans	Away	Won 42-0
June 19	New Jersey Titans	Away	Won 42-0
June 26	West Michigan Mayhem (National Conference Quarterfinal)	Home	Won 35-33
July 10	Columbus Comets (National Conference Semifinal)	Away	Lost 7-36

== 2011 ==
=== Standings ===
2011 Northeast Division
	W	L	T	PCT	PF	PA	DIV	GB	STK
y-D.C. Divas	7	1	0	0.875	332	69	4-0	---	W1
Keystone Assault	3	5	0	0.375	92	166	1-3	4.0	W2
Philadelphia Liberty Belles	2	6	0	0.250	137	219	1-3	5.0	L4

=== Season schedule ===
Date	Opponent	Home/Away	Result
April 2	New York Sharks	Home	Lost 20-34
April 9	New England Nightmare	Home	Won 52-0
April 16	D.C. Divas	Away	Lost 0-20
May 7	Keystone Assault	Home	Won 28-12
May 14	New York Sharks	Away	Lost 21-27
May 21	D.C. Divas	Home	Lost 0-42
June 4	Boston Militia	Away	Lost 8-70
June 11	Keystone Assault	Away	Lost 8-14

== 2012 ==
=== Standings ===
2012 WFA Division 2
	W	L	T	PCT	PF	PA	DIV	GB	STK
y - Boston Militia	8	0	0	1.000	458	139	4-0	---	W8
z - New York Sharks	4	4	0	0.500	104	227	2-2	4	W2
Philadelphia Liberty Belles	2	6	0	0.250	30	234	0-3	6	L3

y - clinched division title
z - clinched division title

=== Season schedule ===
Date	Opponent	Home/Away	Result
April 14	New England Nightmare	Away	Won 14-0
April 21	Boston Militia	Home	Lost 0-59
May 5	New York Sharks	Away	Lost 8-25
May 12	Boston Militia	Away	
May 19	Keystone Assault	Home	
June 2	New York Sharks	Home	
June 9	Maine Lynx	Away	
June 16	Pittsburgh Passion	Home	
