= Maine Lynx =

- Founded: 2011
- League: Women's Football Alliance (2012); Women's Spring Football League (2013-present)
- Team history: Maine Lynx (2012-present)
- Based in: Portland, Maine
- Stadium: Memorial Stadium
- Colors: Navy blue, orange, white
- Championships: 0

The Maine Lynx are a team of the Women's Spring Football League which began play in 2012. Based in Portland, the Lynx play their home games at Memorial Stadium.

They played their inaugural year in the Women's Football Alliance before they switched to the WSFL for 2013.

== Season-by-season ==
Season records
Season	W	L	T	Finish	Playoff results
2012	1	7	0	3rd National Division 1	--

* = current standing

== 2012 roster ==
Maine Lynx roster
Quarterbacks: currently vacant; Running backs: currently vacant; Wide receivers: currently vacant	Offensive line: currently vacant; Defensive line: currently vacant; Linebackers: currently vacant	Defensive backs: currently vacant; Special teams: currently vacant; Multiple/Unknown Positions: -- Carrie Arsenault WR/C; -- Ashley Blanchard DE/K/WR; -- Cassandra Hutcheson RB/TE; -- Kristal Saavedra WR/S; -- Nicole Cavaleri; -- Heather Dadiegl; -- Ashleigh Farmer; -- Katie Gagnon; -- Kourtney Jonas; -- Jamee Moulder; -- Savannah Sibley; -- Sara Thomson; -- Kassi Tibbetts	Injured reserve: currently vacant; Exempt List: currently vacant; Practice squad: currently vacant; rookies in italics; Roster updated January 3, 2012; 13 Active, 0 Inactive, 0 PS

== 2012 ==
=== Standings ===
2012 Division 1
	W	L	T	PCT	PF	PA	DIV	GB	STK
Keystone Assault	5	1	0	0.800	204	45	2-0	---	W3
New England Nightmare	2	3	0	0.400	99	91	1-1	1.0	L1
Maine Lynx	1	3	0	0.250	38	117	0-2	3.0	W1

=== Season schedule ===
Date	Opponent	Home/Away	Result
April 14	Keystone Assault	Away	Lost 0-54
April 21	New York Sharks	Home	Lost 0-6**
April 28	New England Nightmare	Away	Lost 7-51
May 12	Keystone Assault	Home	
May 19	Mass Chaos (WSFL)	Away	
June 2	Boston Militia	Away	
June 9	Philadelphia Liberty Belles	Home	
June 16	New England Nightmare	Home	
