= Keystone Assault =

- Founded: 2009
- League: Women's Football Alliance (2009-2012, 2016-2017); Independent Women's Football League (2013-2014); Women's Spring Football League (2015); United States Women's Football League (2019-Present)
- Team history: Keystone Assault (2009-present)
- Based in: Enola, Pennsylvania
- Stadium: Lower Dauphin Middle School
- Colors: Blue, gold, white
- Owner: Bill Green
- Head coach: TBA
- Championships: 1 WSFL 2015

The Keystone Assault is a member of the United States Women Football League. Previously have been a member of the Women's Football Alliance and a former charter member of the league. The team began play in the WFA for its inaugural 2009 season. Based in the Pennsylvania capital of Harrisburg, the Assault plays its home games at Lower Dauphin Middle School and formerly at East Pennsboro High School in nearby Hummelstown, Pennsylvania. The team was derived from many players and coaches from the defunct Central PA Vipers (2006-2009).

== Season-by-season ==
Season records
Season	W	L	T	Finish	Playoff results
2009	4	4	0	4th National Northeast (WFA)	--
2010	6	2	0	2nd National East (WFA)	--
2011	3	5	0	2nd National Northeast (WFA)	--
2012	6	1	0	1st National Division (WFA)	--
2013	7	2	0	Mid Atlantic Division (IWFL)	--
2014	8	1	0	2nd Mid Atlantic Division (IWFL)	--
2015	9	0	0	Northeast Division (WSFL)	WSFL Champions
2019	4	4	0	USWFL	
Totals	38	19	0		

* = current standing

== Roster ==
Keystone Assault roster
Quarterbacks: 13 Rachel Fischer; Running backs: 4 Jere’e Clark; 5 Veronica Martinez; 7 Mariah Green; 9 Norma Reyes; 17 Jessica Rodriguez; 33 Aisha Short; Receivers: 5 Veronica Martinez; 8 Amber Hollman; 18 Tasia Layton; 23 Seneka Blackwell; 24 Briana Sye; 26 Bianca Santos; 33 Aisha Short; 94 Cheyenne Nicole	Offensive line: 12 Stephanie Enck; 19 Jasmine Brown; 20 Katie Shambaugh; 24 Briana Sye; 44 Brittany Lessig; 52 Lesly Trinta; 54 Lydia Lessig; 58 Kaeli Thomas; 67 Samantha Fellner; 75 Stephanie Stewart; 83 Danielle Orr; 97 Deana Schleig; 98 Innocence Bello; Defensive line: 12 Stephanie Enck; 19 Jasmine Brown; 21 Melissa Grafmyer; 24 Briana Sye; 44 Brittany Lessig; 50 Nicole Noon; 52 Lesly Trinta; 58 Kaeli Thomas; 75 Stephanie Stewart; 83 Danielle Orr; 97 Deana Schleig; 98 Innocence Bello; Linebackers: 5 Veronica Martinez; 6 Samantha Moyer; 9 Norma Reyes; 10 Shalawn James; 11 Teneisha Burnette; 23 Seneka Blackwell; 26 Bianca Santos; 34 Tuffy Howard	Defensive backs: 8 Amber Hollman; 10 Shalawn James; 17 Jessica Rodriguez; 18 Tasia Layton; 30 Jennifer Dixon; 97 Cheyenne Nickle; Special teams: 8 Amber Hollman(Punter); 13 Rachel Fisher(Punter); 14 Brittany King (Kicker); 26 Bianca Santos (Kicker)	Roster as of January 3, 2012	34 Active, 0 Inactive, 0 PS

== 2009 ==
=== Season schedule ===
Date	Opponent	Home/Away	Result
April 18	Philadelphia Liberty Belles	Away	Lost 24-47
April 25	Binghamton Tiger Cats	Away	Won 34-20
May 9	Baltimore Burn	Home	Lost 16-20
May 16	Philadelphia Liberty Belles	Home	Lost 12-14
May 30	Binghamton Tiger Cats	Home	Won 32-6
June 6	Baltimore Burn	Away	Lost 22-44
June 13	New Jersey Titans	Away	Won 28-6
June 20	Connecticut Cyclones	Home	Won 6-0**

== 2010 ==
=== Season schedule ===
Date	Opponent	Home/Away	Result
April 10	New Jersey Titans	Away	Won 30-16
April 24	Southern Tier Spitfire	Home	Won 56-0
May 1	New England Nightmare	Away	Won 56-6
May 15	Philadelphia Liberty Belles	Home	Lost 35-12
May 22	Baltimore Burn	Away	Won 34-24
June 5	New Jersey Titans	Home	Won 28-8
June 12	Southern Tier Spitfire	Away	Won 38-0
June 19	Baltimore Burn	Home	Lost 36-24

** = Won by forfeit

== 2011 ==
=== Standings ===
2011 Northeast Division
	W	L	T	PCT	PF	PA	DIV	GB	STK
y-D.C. Divas	7	1	0	0.875	332	69	4-0	---	W1
Keystone Assault	3	5	0	0.375	92	166	1-3	4.0	W2
Philadelphia Liberty Belles	2	6	0	0.250	137	219	1-3	5.0	L4

=== Season schedule ===
Date	Opponent	Home/Away	Result
April 9	D.C. Divas	Away	Lost 6-55
April 16	Northeastern Nitro	Home	Lost 0-6
April 30	D.C. Divas	Home	Lost 0-49
May 7	Philadelphia Liberty Belles	Away	Lost 12-28
May 14	New England Nightmare	Away	Won 27-0
June 4	Northeastern Nitro	Away	Lost 6-12
June 11	Philadelphia Liberty Belles	Home	Won 14-8
June 18	New England Nightmare	Home	Won 26-8

== 2012 ==
=== Standings ===
2012 Division 1
	W	L	T	PCT	PF	PA	DIV	GB	STK
Keystone Assault	5	1	0	0.800	204	45	2-0	---	W3
New England Nightmare	2	3	0	0.400	99	91	1-1	1.0	L1
Maine Lynx	1	3	0	0.250	38	117	0-2	3.0	W1

=== Season schedule ===
Date	Opponent	Home/Away	Result
April 14	Maine Lynx	Home	Won 54-0
April 21	New England Nightmare	Away	Won 50-0
April 28	Boston Militia	Home	Lost 0-31
May 5	Baltimore Burn (WSFL)	Home	Won 34-6
May 12	Maine Lynx	Away	Won 46-8
May 19	Philadelphia Liberty Belles	Away	Won 20-0
June 2	New England Nightmare	Home	Won 42-0
June 16	Pittsburgh Force	Away	Won 50-15
