= Belleville Municipal Stadium =

Sports venue in Belleville, New Jersey

Coordinates: 40.80392°N 74.16232°W

- Interactive map of Belleville Municipal Stadium
- Location: 100 Passaic Avenue, Belleville, NJ 07109
- Surface: Turf

Tenants
- New Jersey Titans (WSFL); New Jersey Spartans (Amateur)

Belleville Municipal Stadium is a facility located in Belleville, New Jersey. It is the home of the New Jersey Titans of the Women's Spring Football League (WSFL), and the New Jersey Spartans football organization.
