= The Italian Stallion =

The Italian Stallion may refer to:

== Film ==
- Nickname of Rocky Balboa, the fictional character in Rocky and its sequels
- A 1970 low-budget film starring Sylvester Stallone in his first film role, originally titled The Party at Kitty and Stud's

== Nickname or stage name ==
- Johnny Musso (born 1950), American football player
- Bob Pisani, American television news correspondent
- The Italian Stallion (wrestler) (Gary Sabaugh, born 1957), American professional wrestler
- Rocco Siffredi (born 1964), Italian porn actor
- J.T. Smith (wrestler) (born 1967), American professional wrestler
- Sylvester Stallone (born 1946), American actor, who played the character Rocky Balboa

== See also ==
- List of Italian horse breeds
- Stallion (disambiguation)
