= Mississippi Storm =

- Full name: Mississippi Storm
- Nickname: Storm
- Founded: 2011
- Dissolved: 2014
- Ground: Greyhound Stadium; Ocean Springs, Mississippi
- Capacity: 6,000
- General Manager: Charles Alexander
- Head Coach: J. William Gronau
- League: National Premier Soccer League
- Website: http://www.msstormsoccer.com/

The Mississippi Storm was an American soccer team, based in the Biloxi suburb of Ocean Springs, Mississippi, which competed in National Premier Soccer League (NPSL). The Mississippi Storm withdrew from the NPSL and folded in 2014.

== History ==
On October 7, 2012, the NPSL accepted the Storm as one of the expansion clubs for their 2012 season.

== Stadium ==
- Greyhound Stadium (2012–2013)

The Storm played their home games at Greyhound Stadium, also known as Hugh Pepper Field and Ocean Springs High School Stadium, in Ocean Springs, Mississippi on the campus of Ocean Springs High School.

== Players and staff ==
Note: Flags indicate national team as defined under FIFA eligibility rules; some limited exceptions apply. Players may hold more than one non-FIFA nationality. Squad correct as of Dec 27, 2012.

No.	Pos.	Nation	Player
0	GK	USA	Zach Wallace
1	GK	USA	Xavier Audergon
2	MF	USA	Jarred Arde
3	DF	USA	Joshua Shields
4	MF	USA	Kyle Kimbrell
5	MF	USA	Jonathon Fairbairn
6	DF	USA	Julio Espinosa
7	MF	USA	Ivan Lopez
9	MF	USA	Raul Gonzales
10	MF	USA	Patrick Harrison
11	FW	USA	David Smith Jr
13	FW	USA	Carlos Blandon
14	MF	USA	Nikolas Garcia
16	DF	USA	Jon Skelton
19	FW	USA	Joel Villa
20	FW	USA	Jesus Villa
21	DF	USA	Charlie Robertson
22	FW	USA	Harrison Russell
23	DF	USA	Roy Kimbrell
24	DF	USA	Derrick Troutman
27	FW	USA	Dyllon Beasley
28	DF	USA	Samuel Ambroise
29	DF	USA	Zachary Villarrubia
30	MF	USA	Ruban Diaz

=== Staff ===
- (United States) J. William Gronau – Head Coach
- (United States) Charles Alexander – General Manager

== Record ==
=== Year-by-year ===
Year	Division	League	Regular season	Playoffs	U.S. Open Cup
2012	4	NPSL	4th, South-Southeast-West	Did not qualify	Did not qualify
2013	4	NPSL	6th, Southeast	Did not qualify	Did not qualify
