= Cape Fear Thunder =

- Founded: 2003
- League: Women's Spring Football League
- Team history: Women's Football League (2003); WPFL (2005–2006); IWFL (2007–2009); WSFL (2011–2015)
- Based in: Fayetteville, North Carolina
- Stadium: John P. Daskyll Stadium, Reid Ross High School
- Colors: Black, Old Gold
- Owner: Vern Pettaway
- Head coach: Vern Pettaway
- General manager: Jen Shank
- Championships: 2

The Cape Fear Thunder is a football team in the Women's Spring Football League (WSFL) based in Fayetteville, North Carolina. Home games are played at John P. Daskyll Stadium on the campus of Reid Ross High School.

The Thunder began in 2003 as the Fayetteville Thunder in the Women's Football League. After a one-season hiatus, the team returned to action as the Cape Fear Thunder. In 2005 and 2006, the Thunder played in the Women's Professional Football League.

From 2007 to 2009, the Thunder competed in the Independent Women's Football League. 2011 saw the team moving to a new women's football league, the Women's Spring Football League. The Cape Fear Thunder captured the WSFL's 2011 8's Division National Championship after a 4-2-1 record for the season. In 2014, the Cape Fear Thunder defeated the West Virginia Wildfire 34–26 to capture their second WSFL 8s division championship.

In 2016, the Thunder moved to the Ladies American Football League.

== Season-By-Season ==
Season records
Season	W	L	T	Finish	Playoff results
Fayetteville Thunder (WFL)
2003	3	3	0	2nd League	--
Cape Fear Thunder (WPFL)
2005	2	5	0	4th National East	--
2006	1	1	0	X-Team	--
Cape Fear Thunder (IWFL)
2007	1	7	0	3rd Eastern Mid-Atlantic	--
2008	2	6	0	3rd Southern South Atlantic	--
2009	1	7	0	19th League	--
Cape Fear Thunder (WSFL)
2011	4	2	1	1st League	Declared W8FL Champions (based on regular season record)
2012	3	8	0	2nd Eastern	--
2013	1	4	0	3rd League	--
2014	3	5	0	4th League	Won League Semifinal (Nashville); Won W8FL Championship (West Virginia)
2015	2	2	0	2nd League	Lost WSFL Championship (New York)
Cape Fear Thunder (LAFL)
2016	1	4	0	4th League	--
Totals	24	54	1		

== 2012 Season Schedule ==
Date	Opponent	Home/Away	Result
April 14	Carolina Queens	Home	
April 21	Three Rivers Xplosion	Home	
April 28	Three Rivers Xplosion	Away	
May 5	West Virginia Wildfire	Home	
May 19	West Virginia Wildfire	Away	
May 26	Huntsville Tigers	Away	
June 9	Huntsville Tigers	Home	
June 16	West Virginia Wildfire	Away	
June 30	West Virginia Wildfire	Home	
July 21	Divisional Playoff	TBD	
