= Greater Binghamton FC =

- Full name: Greater Binghamton Futbol Club
- Nickname: GBFC
- Founded: 2012; 14 years ago
- Dissolved: 2018; 8 years ago
- Stadium: Greater Binghamton Sports Complex; Binghamton, New York, U.S.
- Capacity: ~2,000
- Owner: Bahij Kashou
- General Manager: Al Mydlinski
- Head Coach: Al Mydlinski
- Website: http://greaterbinghamtonfc.com/

Greater Binghamton FC (GBFC) is an American soccer team located in Binghamton, New York. The team was established in 2012.

The team plays its home games out of the Greater Binghamton Sports Complex.

== History ==
Greater Binghamton Futbol Club (GBFC) was founded in 2012 in Binghamton, New York to compete in the National Premier Soccer League (NPSL), the fourth tier of the American soccer pyramid and roughly equivalent with the USL Premier Development League (PDL). The team played their first game on May 13, 2012 a 2-2 draw away against AFC Cleveland.

In their second season, GBFC finished 1st in the Keystone Conference during the regular season with a record of 10-2-2, going on to defeat the New York Red Bulls NPSL squad 2-1 in Binghamton, but ultimately losing to defending NPSL champions, Lehigh Valley United, 1-0 in the Northeast Region finals.

== Year-by-year ==
Year	Division	League	Regular season	Playoffs	Open Cup
2012	4	NPSL	4th, Great Lakes	Division Semi-Final	Not eligible
2013	4	NPSL	1st, Keystone	Regional Final	Did not qualify
2014	4	NPSL	1st, Keystone	Regional Final	Second round

== Stadium ==
- Greater Binghamton Sports Complex; Binghamton, New York
