= Galveston Pirate SC =

Pirate Soccer Club
- Pirate SC Badge with Championship Star
- Full name: Pirate Soccer Club
- Nickname: The Pirate
- Founded: 1916
- Ground: courville stadium
- Capacity: 10,000
- Owner: Brendan Keyes
- League: National Premier Soccer League
Home colors

Galveston Pirate SC is an American soccer team based in League City, Texas. Founded in 1916, the team played until the 1940s, then reemerged in the 1960s and 1970s for a period of about seven years each time.

In 2010 the team was again reborn and played in the fourth-tier National Premier Soccer League as an expansion team in 2011–12, a season they finished as the champions of the South Central Conference. Team owner Brendan Keyes relocated and re-branded the NPSL franchise for the 2013 season as Houston Hurricanes FC, but stated he will continue to use the Pirate brand in local leagues and tournament.

The team's colors are Navy Blue, Gold and White.

== History ==
Galveston Pirate SC has a long history in the Galveston area going back to the original soccer team of 1916. The team came back in the 1960s and 70s, but lost momentum.

=== Galveston Pirate SC joins NPSL ===
On June 1, 2010, the National Premier Soccer League introduced Galveston Pirate SC as the thirty-fifth team to join the league and the second team to join the Texas Division. Regals FC, Corpus Christi Fuel, and FC Tulsa. Pirate SC, Regals FC, Corpus Christi Fuel, and FC Tulsa would have made up the Texas Division of the National Premier Soccer League and would have begun play in the 2010–2011 season in October 2010 and continued into March 31, 2011. The Winter League would have complemented the already existing NPSL Premier Season which runs yearly from April 1 to August 1. Galveston Pirate SC announced they would play their home games at Kermit Courville Stadium (owned by the Galveston Independent School District). NPSL named Brendan Keyes as the owner of Galveston Pirate SC.

=== Galveston Pirate SC, NPSL South Central create SPSL ===
Before the NPSL Winter League could start, FC Tulsa left the division at the last minute. National Premier Soccer League's remaining three South Central teams, Galveston Pirate SC, Regals FC, and Corpus Christi Fuel, joined with Texas Lonestrikers, Tulsa Lobos FC, and Houston-based Club América Academy, to form the Southern Premier Soccer League to play later that year for the 2010–11 SPSL Winter Season.

=== Rise to Division 4 ===
On October 12, 2011, the National Premier Soccer League announced that five new teams, including Galveston Pirate SC, would join the league for the 2012 season in the Southeast Division in the Western Conference.

=== Galveston Pirate SC joins the TPSL ===
Galveston Pirate SC was a founding member of the Texas Premier Soccer League.

=== Galveston Pirate in the Houston Football Association ===
In July 2015, Galveston Pirate announced, that they were going to continue playing in the Houston Football Association, (HFA). The HFA is sanctioned by United States Specialty Sports Association and US Soccer.

=== Galveston Pirate SC official affiliations ===
Galveston Pirate SC have announced official affiliation partnerships with Alloway FC, Queensland Australia; Monmouth Town FC, Monmouth, Wales, United Kingdom, Walsall Football Club, and Walsall Supporters Trust, Walsall, England, United Kingdom and The West Indies Football Association, Walsall Football Club (Sierra Leone), and Atlentico Stars FC in Kisumu Nyalenda Kenya.

=== Notable matches ===
==== Galveston Pirate SC v San Antonio Scorpions ====
On March 9, 2012, Galveston Pirate Soccer Club made the trip to San Antonio to face off in a scrimmage match against new North American Soccer League side, San Antonio Scorpions.

The kickoff was scheduled for Friday 9th at 8pm but due to torrential rain, the start was delayed until the following morning at 9.30. The venue was also rearranged, with Heroes Stadium now being the preferred choice thanks to the artificial turf being more durable in the weather conditions.

The match ended 3–0 for the Scorpions but proved to be a worthwhile run out for both sides as they headed towards both their upcoming inaugural respective NASL & NPSL seasons.

==== Pirate v Monterrey Rayados ====
On April 20, 2012, Galveston Pirate Soccer Club announced the details of possibly the largest sporting event that the City of Galveston has ever seen.

The club revealed that after extensive talks, they had secured an international challenge match with 2 time, re-crowned, CONCACAF Champions, Club de Futbol Monterrey who ply their trade in the Liga MX.

The match was played at Galveston's stadium, Kermit Courville which has a capacity of 10,000.

July 2, 7pm kickoff, Kermit Courville Stadium, 1307, 27th Street, Galveston.

Admiral Sports Texas State Cup

February 8, 2015, An improbable run saw Pirate SC advance to the finals of the Texas State Cup where they fell 4–2 to Austin Real Cuauhtémoc.

== Crest and jersey ==
The colors of Pirate SC's crest are navy blue, yellow and white. The Est. 1916 ribbon in the crest is a nod to the original Galveston Pirate Soccer Club first formed in 1916.

=== Admiral join as kit supplier ===
On January 24, 2012, the Pirate were proud to announce a 5-year deal with UK Sports apparel giant, Admiral Sportswear.

=== Uniform unveiling ===
On March 5, 2012, Galveston Pirate proudly unveiled their new Admiral supplied uniform for the upcoming NPSL South-South Central Conference season.

=== Home uniform sponsor ===
Pirate Soccer Club has not announced a shirt sponsor for 2015/16 Season Pirate Soccer Club were sponsored by Miller Lite in 2014/15

=== Away uniform sponsor ===
Pirate SC have not announced an Away Shirt Sponsor for 2015/16 Season Pirate Soccer Club were sponsored by Miller Lite in 2014/15

== Stadium ==
=== Current ===
Galveston Pirate SC has not announced a home field for the 2015/16 season.

=== Previous ===
- Kermit Courville Stadium; Galveston, Texas (2010–2011)
- Weis Middle School Stadium; Galveston, Texas (2012)
- Dow Park; Deer Park, Texas (2013/14)

== Team officials ==
- Owner: William Alsobrook
- Equity Partners: Bethany Alsobrook, James Baird

Senior Club Staff

- Chief Executive Officer: William Alsobrook
- Chief Human Resources Officer: Bethany Alsobrook
- Chief Financial Officer: Bethany Alsobrook
- Chief Operating Officer: Ernie Alsobrook
- Senior Vice President: Linda Alsobrook
- Executive Vice President for Soccer Operations: James Baird
- Executive Vice President of Marketing: Tyler Cambell
- Executive Vice President:
- General Manager:
- Assistant General Manager:

Coaching Staff

- Head coach:
- Assistant coach:
- Assistant coach:
- Assistant coach:
- Goalkeepers Coach:

== Trivia ==
- Roy Hernandez is the first Pirate SC player to score a hat-trick, doing so in the third preseason match on July 10, 2010 against Houston Football Association's Houston Rangers by a score of 3–1 in Pirate SC's inaugural season. Hernandez got the team's and his second hat-trick, against the Corpus Christi Fuel two games later in a 3–3 tie.
- Galveston Pirate SC is the oldest soccer club in Texas.
