= Southern Tier Spitfire =

- Founded: 2010
- League: Women's Football Alliance
- Team history: Southern Tier Spitfire (2010)
- Based in: Binghamton, New York
- Stadium: Otsiningo Park
- Colors: Red, black, white
- President: Christine Benjamin
- Head coach: ---
- Championships: 0

The Southern Tier Spitfire were a team of the Women's Football Alliance which began play in 2010. Based in Binghamton, New York, the Spitfire played their home games at Alumni Stadium during their one and only season of existence in 2010. The 2010 Spitfire roster consisted of some players formerly of the Binghamton Tiger Cats who left a few months after the Tiger Cats joined the Independent Women's Football League. For 2011 only 4 former Tiger Cats are still involved with the Spitfire organization. The Spitfire announced in January 2011 that they will not be fielding a team for the 2011 season and are defunct and no longer exist.

== Season-by-season ==
Season records
Season	W	L	T	Finish	Playoff results
2010	0	8	0	3rd National Northeast	
Totals	0	8	0		

* = Current Standing

== Roster ==
Southern Tier Spitfire roster
Quarterbacks: currently vacant; Running backs: currently vacant; 'Wide receivers: currently vacant	Offensive line: currently vacant; Defensive line: currently vacant; Linebackers: currently vacant	Defensive backs: currently vacant; Special teams: currently vacant; Multiple/Unknown Positions: 5 Jackie Tomkins RB/WR; 7 Kim Loutey RB/WR; 18 Melissa Shamberger DE/RB; 19 Jen Robertson RB/LB; 24 Jen Pawol RB/TE; 26 Rachel Patten RB/DB; 55 Cheryl Mundy OL/DL; 57 Jackie Anne Senz OL/DL; 64 Cheri White OL/DL; 69 Jessica Alexander OL/DL; 78 Carrie Pitcher OL/DL; 79 Carol Czimback OL/DL; -- Amy Conklin OL/DL; -- Desirae Perez DB/WR; -- Kiya Ware OL/DL; -- Amber Polhamus; -- Tonya Riegelman; -- Megan Rounds; -- Cindy Sleeper; -- Heather Tinker; -- Ashley Knox	Injured reserve: currently vacant; Exempt List: currently vacant; Practice squad: currently vacant; rookies in italics; Roster as of December 29, 2010; 27 Active, 0 Inactive, 0 PS

== Season schedules ==
=== 2010 ===
Date	Opponent	Home/Away	Result
April 10	Philadelphia Liberty Belles	Home	Lost 0-63
April 24	Keystone Assault	Away	Lost 0-56
May 1	New Jersey Titans	Home	Lost 2-47
May 8	New England Nightmare	Home	Lost 8-28
May 15	Baltimore Burn	Away	Lost 0-6**
May 22	Philadelphia Liberty Belles	Away	Lost 0-71
June 12	Keystone Assault	Home	Lost 0-38
June 19	New England Nightmare	Away	Lost 0-38

** = Forfeited

=== 2011 ===
Date	Opponent	Home/Away	Result
April 2	Northeastern Nitro	Away Cancelled	
April 16	Keystone Assault	Home Cancelled	
April 30	Philadelphia Liberty Belles	Away Cancelled	
May 7	D.C. Divas	Away Cancelled	
May 21	Keystone Assault	Away Cancelled	
June 4	Philadelphia Liberty Belles	Home Cancelled	
June 11	D.C. Divas	Home Cancelled	
May 14	New England Nightmare	Home Cancelled	
