= Texas Premier Soccer League =

Texas Premier Soccer League (TPSL)
- Organising body: US Club Soccer; United States Soccer Federation
- Founded: 2013
- Folded: 2019
- Country: USA
- Number of clubs: 5
- Domestic cup: U.S. Open Cup
- League cup: Texas Cup
- Last champions: Pachuca Tuzos Houston (2019)
- Current Shield: TPSL Shield
- Most championships: Austin Real Cuauhtemoc FC (3)

The Texas Premier Soccer League (TPSL) was a men's outdoor soccer league that was formed in 2013 consisting of amateur soccer club sides across the state.

The TPSL was sanctioned by US Club Soccer, an affiliate member of the United States Soccer Federation (USSF). Each team was individually owned and operated and are responsible for maintaining the league's minimum standards and for raising their own operating revenue.

== History ==
Formed in 2013, the league was developed by Brendan Keyes, Head Coach of the Houston Hurricanes FC. As league President, Keyes commenced negotiations from May 2013 with several local teams, and after the addition of five more clubs, the TPSL was formed with a view to starting play in September 2013 and an eye on expanding the league in future years.

On September 21, 2013 at Fox and Hound in Houston, all six founding member clubs appeared at a press conference in front of friends and family to officially unveil the clubs, rosters, uniforms and sponsors.

In September 2013 six clubs (BCS Bearkatz FC, Galveston Pirate SC, Houston Dutch Lions, Houston Hurricanes FC, Houston Leones FC, Houston Regals SCA) opened play, beginning with a series of league matches. Clubs would break for Texas Cup action over the winter, before returning in February to complete the league regular season.

For the 2014–15 season Austin Real Cuauhtemoc FC, Ranchero King FC, Texas Timberz FC were added to the league alongside returning Twin Cities Hurricanes FC and Galveston. three of the six original clubs did not return for a second season.

The 2015–16 season kicked off with an additional six new clubs: Austin Lonestrikers FC, Brownsville Bravos FC, Dallas Clash SC, Lockhart Knights FC, San Antonio Generals FC and Temple United FC. Galveston and Ranchero King dropped out from the league after the conclusion of season two while Texas Timberz went on hiatus, but will still compete in the Texas Cup.

The final season was played in the 2018–2019 year, the league giving way to the expanding UPSL.

== League structure ==
=== Regular season ===
The regular season typically runs from September to March.

Each side plays one home and one away match against each club during the league season. The regular season winners receive the TPSL Supporters Shield. The league playoff championship winners take home the league trophy which will be returned prior to the following years conclusion of play.

Should teams be equal on points at the end of the regular season, the following format will decide playoff placements: goal difference, head-to-head wins, goals scored

To decide the championship, the top four sides from the regular season will play in a single-elimination seeded playoff format, with the winners from the two semifinal matches meeting each other in the final.

=== Championship Playoffs ===
Semifinal A - Seed 1 v Seed 4
Semifinal B - Seed 2 v Seed 3
Championship Final - Winner Game A v Winner Game B

== Clubs ==
Team	City	Venue	Joined TPSL	President	Head coach
Armadillos FC	Houston	San Jacinto Sportsplex	2019	Alberto Escobar	Alberto Escobar
Athletic Katy FC	Katy	Matias Almeyda Training Center	2018	Raul Flores	Julio Valencia
Celtic FC America	League City	Clear Springs Stadium	2013	Brendan Keyes	Brendan Keyes
Pachuca Tuzos Houston	Houston	George Bush Park	2018	Ricardo Alacron	Ricardo Alacron
West Houston Aguilas	Houston	NRG Stadium	2019	Ubaldo Lucio	Ubaldo Lucio

=== Former member clubs ===
- Austin Lonestrikers FC (2015–16)
- BCS Bearkatz FC (2013–14)
- Brownsville Bravos FC (2015–16)
- Central Texas Lobos FC (2016–17)
- Dallas Clash SC (2015–16)
- Galveston Pirate SC (2013–15)
- Houston Dutch Lions (2013–14)
- Houston Fury FC (2017–18)
- Houston Leones FC (2013–14)
- Houston Regals SCA (2013–14)
- Lockhart Knights FC (2014–15)
- Ranchero King FC (2014–15)
- San Antonio Generals FC (2015–16)
- Temple United FC (2015–16)
- Texas Timberz FC (2014–15)
- Twin Cities FC (2014–18)

== Cup competition ==
=== Lamar Hunt U.S. Open Cup ===
Austin Real Cuauhtemoc FC entered qualification for the 2016 competition playing their match with NTX Rayados in Georgetown, Texas on November 1, 2015. The game ended in a 4-2 loss for ARC.

=== Texas Cup ===
TPSL clubs compete in an annual cup competition with the winner taking home the US Club Soccer-sanctioned Texas Cup. The series of matches take place during the winter break or after the regular season and championship playoffs have concluded.

Year	Winner	Runner up	Result
2014	Houston Dutch Lions	Houston Hurricanes FC	3-3 (5-4 PKs)
2015	Austin Real Cuauhtemoc FC	Galveston Pirate SC	4-2
2016	Austin Real Cuauhtemoc FC	Houston Hurricanes FC	3-1
2017	Central Texas Lobos FC	Austin Real Cuahutemoc FC	2-2 (4-3 PKs)
2018	Bay Area Hurricanes FC	Twin Cities FC	3-2

== Champions ==
Season	TPSL Shield (regular season)	TPSL Cup (playoffs)
2013–14	Houston Dutch Lions	Regals SCA
2014–15	Houston Hurricanes FC	Austin Real Cuauhtemoc FC
2015–16	Dallas Clash SC	Austin Real Cuauhtemoc FC
2016–17	Twin Cities FC	Austin Real Cuauhtemoc FC
2017–18	Twin Cities FC	Twin Cities FC
2018-19	Bay Area Hurricanes FC	Pachuca Tuzos Houston

== Staff ==
- President - Alberto Escobar
- Vice President -Brendan Keyes
