= 2012 USASA Region III National Cup =

Tournament details
- Country: United States
- Teams: 8

The USASA Region III National Cup took place between April 27 and April 29, 2012, and acted as a qualifying tournament for the 2012 U.S. Open Cup with each group winner securing a place in the Open Cup. The tournament took place at the Houston Amateur Sports Park in Houston, Texas.

== Group stage ==
=== Group A ===
Team	Pld	W	D	L	GF	GA	GD	Pts
(Texas) ASC New Stars	3	2	1	0	9	2	7	7
(Texas) Galveston Pirate SC	3	2	0	1	7	6	1	6
(Texas) FC Rahr	3	1	0	2	4	8	-4	3
(South Carolina) Greenville Eagles	3	0	1	2	2	6	-4	1

=== Group B ===
Team	Pld	W	D	L	GF	GA	GD	Pts	Result
(Texas) NTX Rayados	3	2	0	1	8	9	-1	6	NTX 4-0 RE
(Florida) Royal Eagles	3	2	0	1	7	8	-1	6	NTX 4-0 RE
(Oklahoma) Boston Avenue AC	3	1	0	2	7	7	0	3	BOS 2-0 BAR
(Texas) Barracudas	3	1	0	2	8	6	+2	3	BOS 2-0 BAR

=== Advancing to Open Cup ===
- (Texas) ASC New Stars
- (Texas) NTX Rayados
