= Charlie Robertson (footballer) =

Australian rules footballer

Personal information
- Full name: Charles Johnston Robertson
- Born: 2 January 1873; South Melbourne, Victoria
- Died: 7 March 1940 (aged 67); Ormond, Victoria
- Original team: Port Melbourne

Playing career^{1}
Years	Club	Games (Goals)
1900–01	South Melbourne	6 (0)
- ^{1} Playing statistics correct to the end of 1901.

Charles Johnston Robertson (2 January 1873 – 7 March 1940) was an Australian rules footballer who played with South Melbourne in the Victorian Football League (VFL).
