= Charles John Robertson =

English botanical illustrator

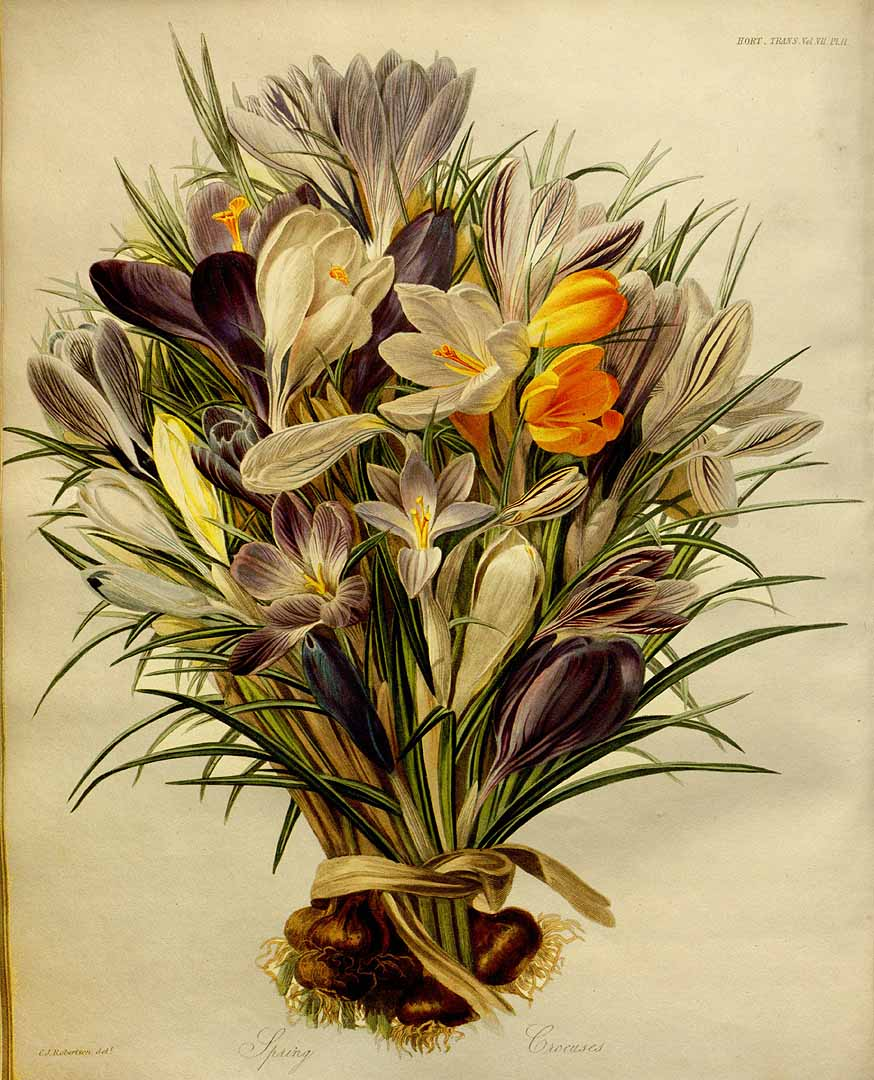
'Crocus spp.' (1830)

Charles John Robertson (1798-1830), was an English botanical illustrator who lived at Worton House, Isleworth, and was a member of the RSA. He produced illustrations for the Botanical Register and for Transactions of the Royal Horticultural Society of London.

The gold Isis medal was presented to Mr. Robertson, for his improved method of executing paintings in watercolours. By a combination of processes, some original, others already known to a few artists, he has succeeded in giving to his pictures a purity of tint, and a strength and solidity of colour, which renders them almost a perfect representation of paintings in oil. A specimen was exhibited to the Society, which has been executed several years, and has been cleaned, when dirty, by means of spirit of wine; and neither by time, nor by the use of this menstruum, have the colours been at all impaired.

— Transactions of the Society, Instituted at London, for the Encouragement of Arts, Manufactures, and Commerce, Vol. 47 (1828-1829), pp. v-xxviii
