= Charles Robertson (English painter) =

English painter and engraver (1844–1891)

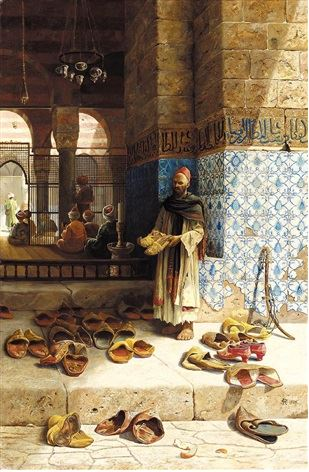
The Shoes of the Faithful

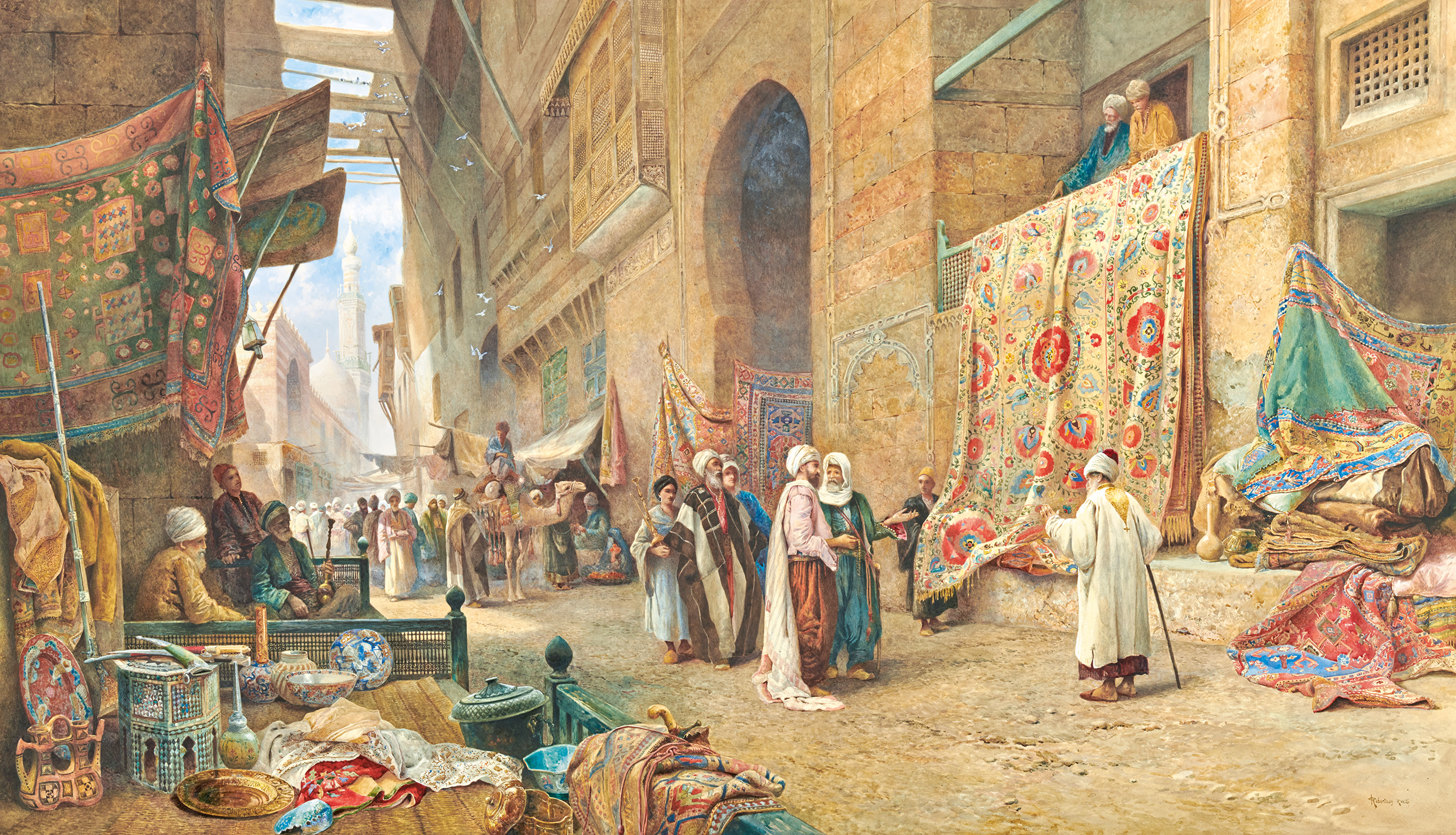
A Carpet Seller in Cairo

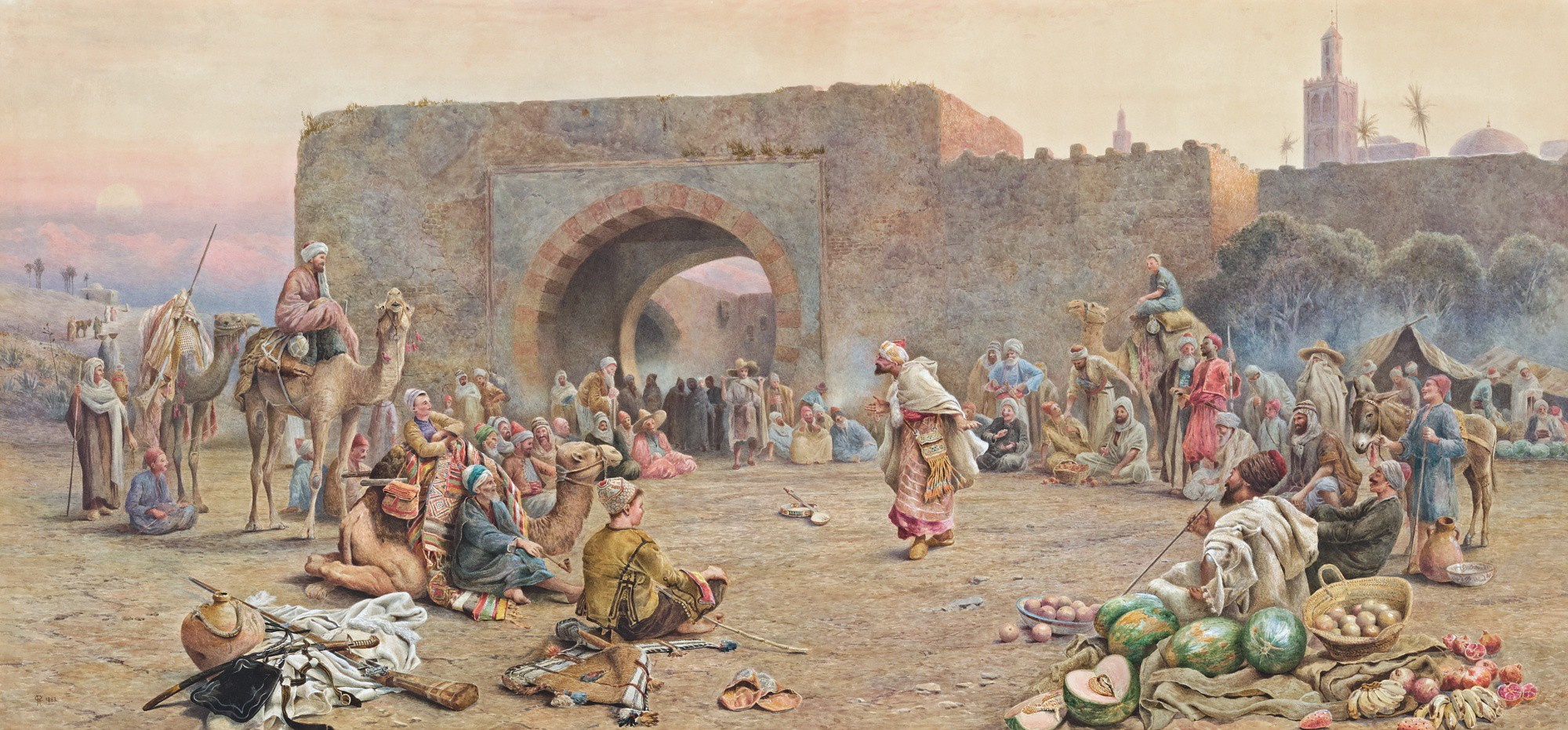
A Story Teller, Morocco (1883)

Charles Robertson RWS (1844 in Walton-on-Thames – 10 November 1891 in Godalming) was a British painter and engraver. He focused on landscapes and genre scenes and is best remembered for his Orientalist works.

== Biography ==
He studied art in London during the early 1860s, although the details are unknown. The watercolorist, Myles Birket Foster, was a good friend of his and had a noticeable influence on his style, so it is possible that Foster was also his teacher.

For some years, he lived in Aix-en-Provence and, hearing about the opportunities available for aspiring artists, made his first trip to North Africa (Algeria) in 1862. The following year, he had his professional debut at the Royal Academy. In 1865, he married Alice Mary Lonsdale (1836–1916), the daughter of Captain William Lonsdale, one of the founders of the town that would later become Melbourne.

Buoyed by the success of his first exhibits, he travelled to Turkey (1872), then Egypt and Morocco (1876); journeys which would provide him with inspiration and material for the remainder of his career. Toward the end of his life, in 1889, he made an extended visit to Jerusalem, Damascus and Cairo.

After 1884, he worked exclusively in watercolors. He established himself in this medium so quickly that, in 1885, he was elected an associate of the Royal Watercolour Society; becoming a full member shortly before his death. He also served as Vice-President of the Royal Society of Painter-Etchers and Engravers.

A major retrospective of his work was staged by the Fine Art Society from 31 October – 3 December 1892. It consisted of "130 watercolour drawings by the late Charles Robertson, RWS, of Palestine, Cyria [sic], Egypt, &c.."

His paintings are held by the Walker Art Gallery in Liverpool and in the National Gallery of Australia in Canberra.
