= Seacoast United Phantoms (NPSL) =

- Full name: Seacoast United Phantoms
- Nickname: Phantoms
- Founded: 2010; 16 years ago
- Ground: Portsmouth HS Stadium, Portsmouth, New Hampshire
- Capacity: ~1,000
- Owner: Seacoast United Soccer Club
- Head Coach: Alex Ryan
- Website: http://www.seacoastunited.com/SoccerClub/index_E.html
Home colors	Away colors

Seacoast United Phantoms (NPSL) were an American soccer team based in Hampton, New Hampshire, United States. Founded in 2010, the team played home games primarily out of Portsmouth High School.

== History ==
Seacoast United Phantoms were announced as the pinnacle of the development pyramid for the Seacoast United Soccer Club in 2010 and began play in the National Premier Soccer League in 2011. The team was founded following the dissolution of the New Hampshire Mountaineers, which operated in the NPSL for only one season in 2010.

With the expansion of the broader Seacoast United Soccer Club organization into neighboring Maine, the Phantoms welcomed rivals Seacoast United Mariners into the Northeast-Atlantic Division of the NPSL in 2012.

== Players ==
Note: Flags indicate national team as defined under FIFA eligibility rules; some limited exceptions apply. Players may hold more than one non-FIFA nationality.

No. / Pos. / Nation / Player	No. / Pos. / Nation / Player

== Year-by-year ==
Year	Division	League	Regular season	Playoffs	Open Cup
2011	4	NPSL	2nd, Atlantic	Did not qualify	Did not enter
2012	4	NPSL	5th, Atlantic	Did not qualify	Did not enter
2013	4	NPSL	6th, Atlantic	Did not qualify	Did not enter

== Staff ==
- Corlton Simmond – Head Coach (2012 - 2016)
- Alex Ryan (2016–present)
