= Las Vegas Stallions =

- Founded: 2013; 13 years ago
- Dissolved: 2014; 12 years ago
- Ground: Piggott Memorial Stadium, Las Vegas, Nevada
- Capacity: 3,000
- League: National Premier Soccer League
- Final season 2013: 6th, Southern Division

Las Vegas Stallions were an American soccer club. They played in the National Premier Soccer League. They were one of the main soccer clubs in Las Vegas, Nevada. Piggott Memorial Stadium was their venue. It has a capacity of 3,000 people. The Las Vegas Stallions withdrew from the NPSL and folded in 2014.

== Year-by-year ==
| Year | Division | League | Reg. season | Playoffs | Open Cup |
|---|---|---|---|---|---|
| 2013 | 4 | NPSL | 6th, West-Southern | Did not qualify | Did not qualify |
