= Seacoast United Mariners =

- Full name: Seacoast United Mariners
- Nickname: Mariners
- Founded: 2011; 15 years ago
- Stadium: Fitzpatrick Stadium, Portland, Maine
- Capacity: 6,000
- Owner: Yard Dogs
- League: National Premier Soccer League
- 2013: 4th, Atlantic Division; Playoffs: DNQ
- Website: http://www.seacoastunitedmaine.org/Mariners/NPSL/index_E.html
Home colors	Away colors	Third colors

Seacoast United Mariners was an American soccer team based in Portland, Maine, United States. Founded in 2011, the team made its debut in the Northeast-Atlantic Division of the National Premier Soccer League (NPSL), the fourth tier of the United States soccer league system, in 2012. The team is operated by the Seacoast United Soccer Club, alongside division rivals, the Seacoast United Phantoms.

== History ==
The Mariners began play in the Northeast-Atlantic Division of the National Premier Soccer League in 2012. Seacoast United Mariners was originally founded in 1986 as Costal Soccer Club.

== Teams ==
Seacoast United Mariners has two regions Maine South and Maine North. There are teams that play at the premier and select level and offer U9-U18 boys and girls. In 2018 Seacoast United became a part of the US Soccer Development Academy which is the most competitive league that the club has to offer.

== Year-by-year ==
Year	Division	League	Regular season	Playoffs	Open Cup
2012	4	NPSL	7th, Atlantic Division	Did not qualify	Did not enter
2013	4	NPSL	4th, Atlantic Division	Did not qualify	Did not enter

== See also ==
- Seacoast United Phantoms (NPSL)
- Seacoast United Phantoms (PDL)
