= 2014–15 TPSL season =

Texas Premier Soccer League
- Season: 2014/15
- Champions: Austin Real Cuauhtemoc (ARC) League; Austin Real Cuauhtemoc (ARC) Texas Cup
- Matches: 37
- Goals: 155 (4.19 per match)
- Biggest home win: Twin Cities 7 Texas Timberz 1
- Biggest away win: Houston Hurricanes FC 2 ARC 5
- Highest scoring: Rancheros 6 ARC 4

The Texas Premier Soccer League (TPSL) is a men's outdoor soccer league that was formed in 2013 consisting of amateur and semi-professional soccer club sides primarily in the Southern region of the state. 2014/15 was the second full season of play for the league.

For the season 2014/15 Austin Real Cuauhtemoc (ARC), Texas Timberz FC, Twin Cities FC and Ranchero King FC were added to the league alongside Houston Hurricanes FC and Galveston. The four other clubs that had been part of the 2013/14 season did not return.

== Regular season results ==
09/13/14 Twin Cities 3-1 ARC
09/13/14 Timberz 1-2 Rancheros FC
09/20/14 Hurricanes 3-3 Pirates
09/20/14 Timberz 2-3 Twin Cities
09/27/14 Pirates 1-3 Timberz
09/27/14 Rancheros FC 6-4 ARC
10/04/14 Twin Cities 0-3 Hurricanes
10/04/14 ARC 4-0 Timberz
10/04/14 Rancheros 0-3 Pirates
10/11/14 Pirates 2-3 Twin Cities
10/18/14 Hurricanes 3-0 Rancheros
10/18/14 Pirates 3-4 ARC
10/25/14 Rancheros 3-0 Twin Cities
10/25/14 Hurricanes 3-4 Timberz
11/01/14 Pirates 2-0 Hurricanes
11/01/14 Twin Cities 7-1 Timberz
11/08/14 Timberz 3-1 Pirates
11/08/14 ARC 3-0 Rancheros FC
11/15/14 Hurricanes 3-1 Twin Cities
11/15/14 Timberz 2-0 ARC
11/15/14 Pirates 3-0 Rancheros
11/22/14 Rancheros 0-3 Timberz
01/07/15 Rancheros 0-3 Hurricanes
01/17/15 ARC 1-2 Hurricanes
01/17/15 Twin Cities 4-2 Pirates
01/24/15 ARC 4-0 Pirates
01/31/15 Timberz 1-4 Hurricanes
01/31/15 ARC 3-1 Twin Cities
02/14/15 Twin Cities 3-0 Rancheros
02/21/15 Hurricanes 2-5 ARC

=== Playoff semi-finals ===
02/28/15 - Houston Hurricanes 2-1 Texas Timberz
03/07/15 - Austin Real Cuauhtemoc 1-0 Twin Cities

=== Championship final ===
03/28/15 - Houston Hurricanes 1-2 Austin Real Cuauhtemoc

== Texas State Cup ==
=== Eastern ===
12/03/14 - Pirates 1-0 Hurricanes
12/13/14 - Pirates 3-2 Timberz

=== Western ===
01/03/15 - Twin Cities 2-3 ARC

=== Final ===
08/02/15 - Pirates 2-4 ARC

== 2014/15 Season Fixtures (Table Format) ==
=== Regular season Fixtures ===
Away team ->	ARC	Pirates	Hurricanes	Timberz	Twin Cities	Rancheros
ARC	X	<4-0<	^1-2^	<4-0<	<3-1<	<3-0<
Pirates	^3-4^	X	<2-0<	^1-3^	^2-3^	<3-0<
Hurricanes	^2-5^	x3-3x	X	^3-4	<3-1<	<3-0<
Timberz	^2-0^	<3-1<	^1-4^	X	^2-3^	^1-2^
Twin Cities	<3-1<	<4-2<	^0-3^	<7-1<	X	<3-0<
Rancheros	<6-4<	^0-3^	^0-3^	^0-3^	<3-0<	X

=== Regular season standings ===
Correct as of Feb 28th, 2105

	↑↓	Team	GP	Win	Loss	Draw	For	Against	GD	PTS
1	-	Hurricanes	10	6	3	1	26	17	9	19
2	-	ARC	10	6	4	0	29	19	10	18
3		Twin Cities	10	6	4	0	25	20	5	18
4		Timberz	10	5	5	0	20	24	-4	15
5		Pirates	10	3	6	1	20	24	-4	10
6		Rancheros	10	3	7	0	11	26	-15	9

=== Playoffs ===
	Home	Result	Away
February 28, 2015	Houston Hurricanes FC	2-1	Texas Timberz
March 7, 2015	Austin Real Cuauhtemoc (ARC)	1-0	Twin Cities

=== Championship final ===
	Home	Result	Away
March 28, 2015	Houston Hurricanes FC	1-2	Austin Real Cuauhtemoc (ARC)
