= New Hampshire Mountaineers =

- Full name: New Hampshire Mountaineers
- Nickname: Mountaineers
- Founded: 2009
- Dissolved: 2011
- Ground: Southern New Hampshire University; Manchester, New Hampshire
- Capacity: ????
- Owner: (United States) Cheryl Stokes
- Head Coach: Marc Hubbard
- League: National Premier Soccer League
- 2010: 3rd, Northeast-Atlantic Division; Playoffs: DNQ
Home colors	Away colors

New Hampshire Mountaineers was an American soccer team based in Manchester, New Hampshire, United States. Founded in 2009, the team played in the National Premier Soccer League (NPSL), a national amateur league at the fourth tier of the American Soccer Pyramid, in the Northeast Atlantic Division. However prior to the start of the 2011 season, the team folded.

The team played its home games in the stadium at Southern New Hampshire University with the colors navy blue and gold.

== Players ==
=== 2010 Roster ===
Note: Flags indicate national team as defined under FIFA eligibility rules; some limited exceptions apply. Players may hold more than one non-FIFA nationality.

No.	Pos.	Nation	Player
—		USA	Evan Berube
—		USA	Jacobsen Bradley
—		USA	Evan Burokas
—		USA	James Costello
—		USA	Daniel Cripe
—		USA	Christopher Devine
—		USA	Rob Dow
—		USA	Drou Goff
—		USA	Marc Goulet
—		USA	Jonathon Harris
—		USA	Marc Hubbard
—		USA	Ahmad Hussein
—		USA	Mitchell Justus
—		USA	Yannick Kabala
—		USA	Richard Kentish
—		USA	Sean MacDonald

No.	Pos.	Nation	Player
—		USA	Matthew McFadden
—		USA	Brendan McGee
—		USA	Ryan McLeod
—		USA	Gabriel Mercier
—		USA	Peguy Ngatcha
—		USA	Jonathan Nydell
—		USA	Robert Palumbo
—		USA	Steve Palumbo
—		USA	Nicholas Papamichael
—		USA	Evan Polanik
—		USA	Trevor Prophet
—		USA	Charlie Roche
—		USA	Adrian Schippers
—		USA	Harris Smriko
—		USA	Kyle Urso

== Year-by-year ==
Year	Division	League	Regular season	Playoffs	Open Cup
2010	4	NPSL	3rd, Atlantic	Did not qualify	Did not enter

== Head coaches ==
- Marc Hubbard

== Stadia ==
- Stadium at Southern New Hampshire University; Manchester, New Hampshire (2010)
