= Stallion Bus and Transit Corp. =

- Company type: Manufacturing
- Industry: Automotive
- Founded: 2006; 20 years ago
- Headquarters: New York City, United States
- Products: Buses
- Number of employees: 5,118

Stallion Bus is an American bus manufacturer and distributor. They are the North American distributor for Higer Bus from China and their primary products include mid-size coach body built on a Freightliner chassis, Cutaway buses, Customized Mercedes Sprinter vans, and specialty vehicles. Their equipment meets "Buy America" standards and is Altoona Rated. The company was founded in 2006 and now supplies buses all over the United States, Canada, and abroad.

== Models ==
2006–present (Example: 938L)

Model	Capacity	Options
900 = 35 ft (10.67 m); 800 = 30 ft (9.14 m)	30 = 30 Passengers; 33 = 33 passengers 38 = 38 passengers ETC	L = "Lavatory" Restroom; W = "Wheelchair" Wheelchair Ready; C = "ISC" Cummins Engine; A = Canadian Built Model

=== Current ===
Stallion currently produces many different product lines. All current models are 100 inches (2.54 m) wide, exclusive of mirrors.

Model	Photo	Height	Length	Notes
900 series		11 ft 9 in (3.58 m)	35 ft (10.67 m)	First vehicle introduced by the company.; Many seat options including Freedman, and Amaya.; Restyled with split windshield instead of single piece windshield in 2011.; Rear window added in late 2010; Increased safety features including 3 point belts and 6 egress windows added in 2012.; Hydraulic cooling fans replaced with belt driven fans in 2011
900W series		11 ft 9 in (3.58 m)	35 ft (10.67 m)	First vehicle introduced by the company.; Many seat options including Freedman, and Amaya.; Restyled with split windshield instead of single piece windshield in 2011.; Rear window added in late 2010; Increased safety features including 3 point belts and 6 egress windows added in 2012.; Hydraulic cooling fans replaced with belt driven fans in 2011
800 series 833		11 ft 2 in (3.40 m)	30 ft (9.14 m)	Introduced in 2010; Also known as the Pony.; First 30 ft rear engine coach bus to enter the recent coach market.
Double Deck series Clydesdale		13 ft (3.96 m)	38 ft (11.58 m)	Introduced in 2012.; Coming to the market 2013; Open top and Closed top models

== Gallery ==
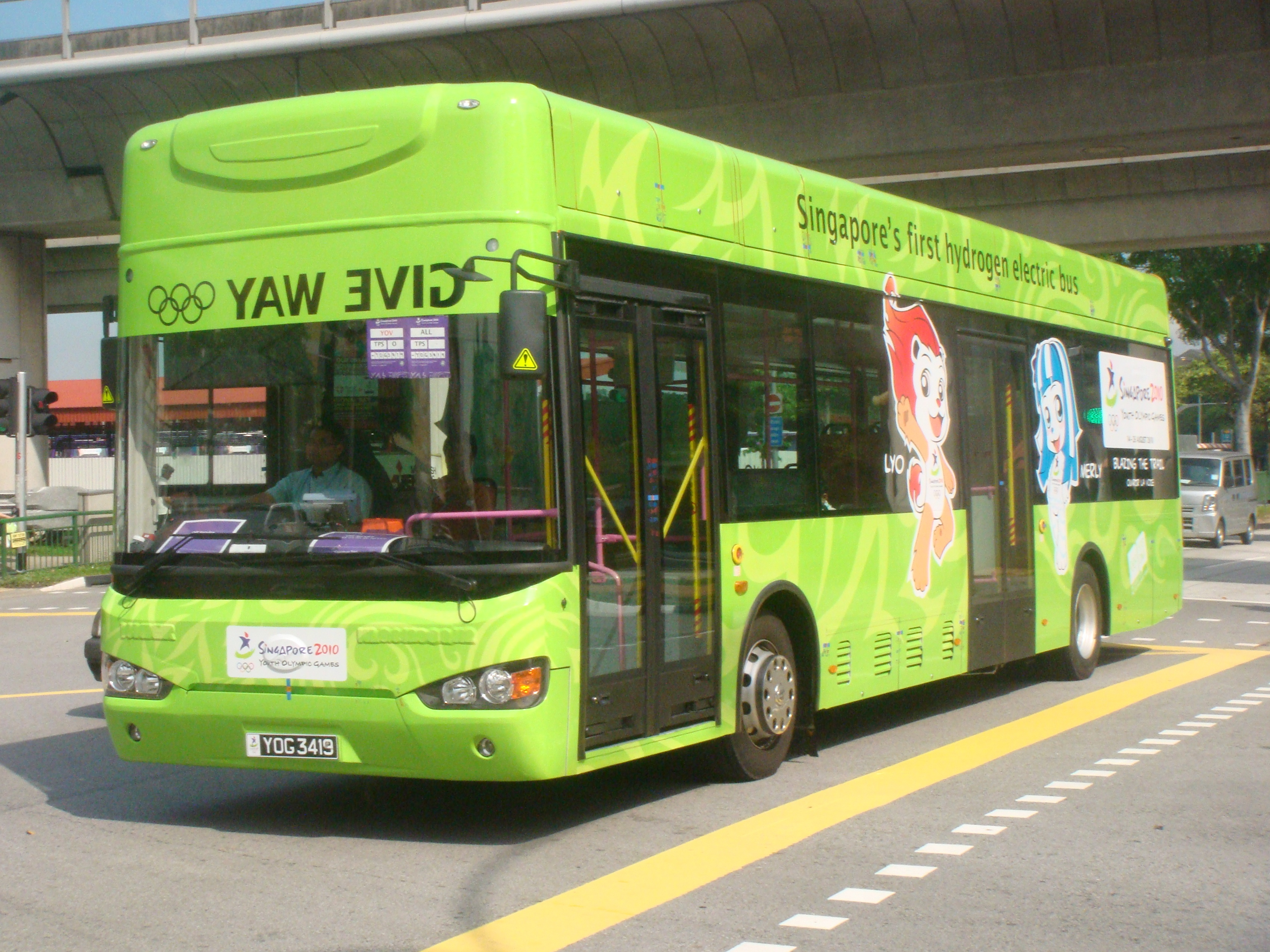
Higer KLQ6129G during Youth Olympic Games 2010

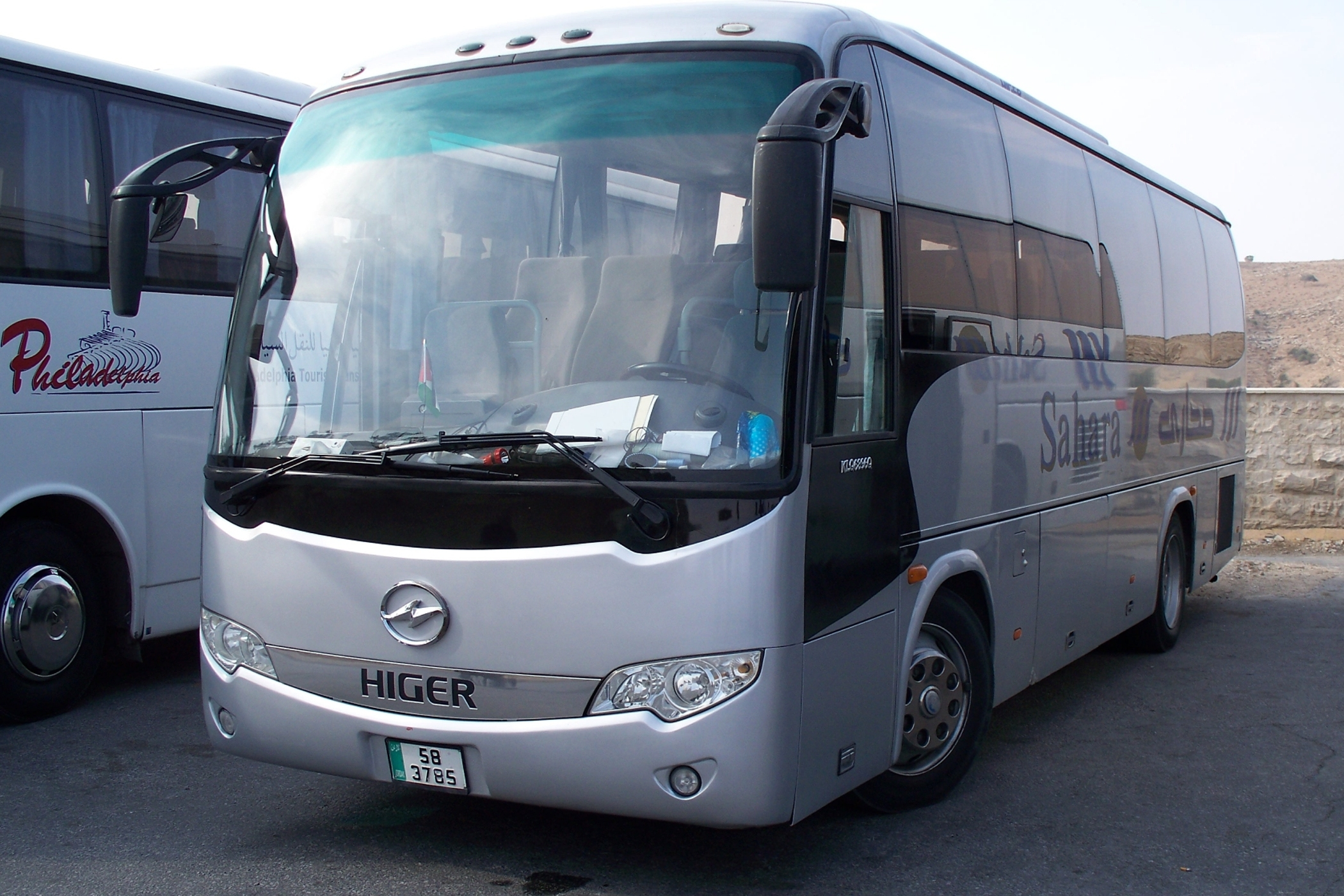
Higer KLQ6896Q in Jordan

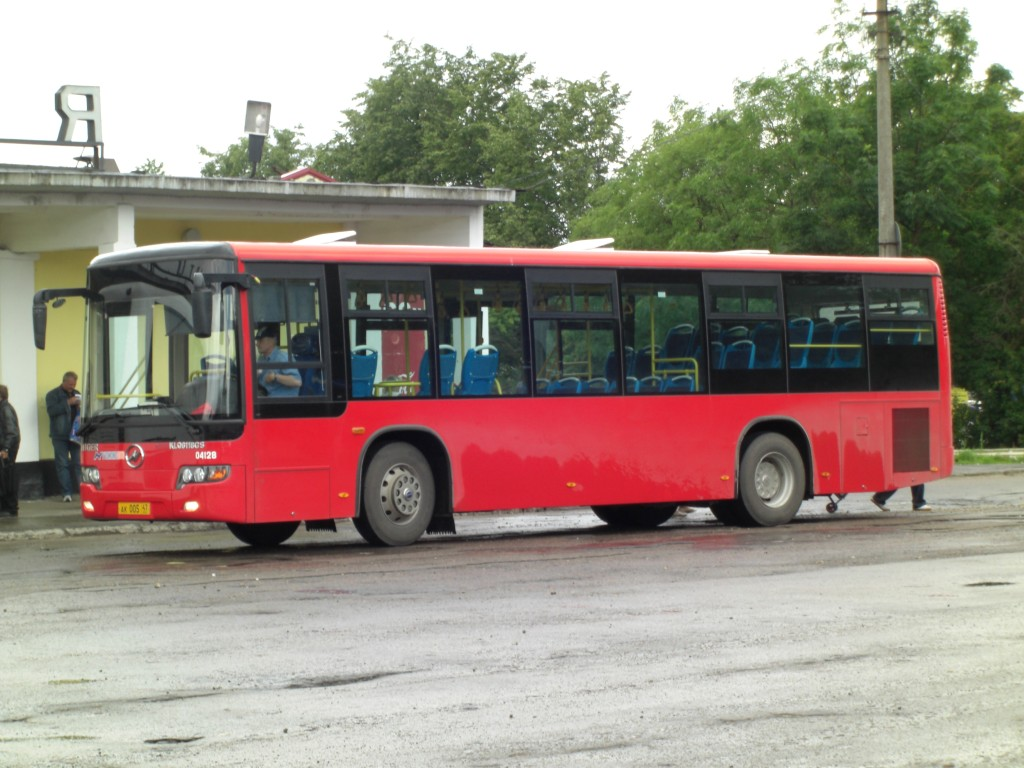
Higer KLQ6118GS in Russia

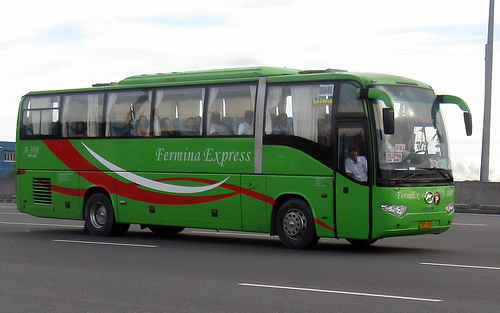
Higer KLQ6119 (V91) in Philippines
