= Greater Binghamton Sports Complex =

Sports venue in Union, New York

Coordinates: 42.15743°N 75.94153°W

The Greater Binghamton Sports Complex was an air-supported dome in Union, New York. With over 125,000 square feet (11,600 m^{2}) in enclosed area, it was the largest air-supported dome in the United States. The complex was located on Airport Road off Route 17 near the city of Binghamton, New York. The purpose of the structure was to house its full size soccer field. The complex contained two offices and a cafe with seating area. The skylight measuring 197’ 6” x 30’ 6 feet (1.8 m) allowed natural light to enter the complex. The facility could house multiple sporting events at once and offered sports such as soccer, rugby union, lacrosse, baseball, and softball. The complex was also the 2009 home of the Binghamton Tiger Cats, a Women's Tackle Football team. By playing in the Complex the Tiger Cats became the first team to play indoors in the history of Women's Professional Football. The complex was engineered by Yeadon Corporation and was inflated in under two weeks.

== Collapse ==
In December 2020 the dome collapsed in an uncontrolled fashion during a record breaking snowstorm where 41 inches (104.14 centimeters) of snow fell in less than 24 hours. The owners have rebuilt the structure, now as a metal building.
