= Nyalenda =

Suburb of Kisumu, Kenya

Coordinates: 0.126675°S 34.757502°E

Nyalenda is an established slum suburb of Kenya's third largest city Kisumu. It is also an electoral ward in the Kisumu Town East Constituency.

The ward is cosmopolitan with mainly the Luo, Lughyas and Kisii as the majority. Other communities include Kalenjins, Kambas Kikuyus, Teso, foreigners, among others. No other place is the term Shemeji clearly demonstrated and practices than in Nyalenda. The Kasagam for example are known to have been fierce Luhya warriors who were only humbled by treaties and agreements with the natives who utilized their warlike nature to fend off the Kisii and Nandi attacks.

== Administration ==
Nyalenda is divided into two sub locations: Nyalenda 'A' and Nyalenda 'B'

=== Nyalenda 'A' ===
Nyalenda ‘A’ is divided into 5 Administrative Village Units:

1. Kanyakwar
2. Dago
3. Central
4. Western
5. Kowino

=== Nyalenda 'B' ===
Nyalenda ‘B’ is divided into other Administrative Village Units:

1. Western
2. Kilo
3. Nanga
4. Dunga

== Development & Economic Activities ==
=== Solid Waste Disposal and Sanitation ===
Each village unit has at least one public toilet, some units have two and one is currently under construction. Specific aspects of the challenges and recommended solutions on Sanitation and Waste disposal are captured in the Nyalenda ‘A’ strategic document. Education There are 2 public primary schools and one special Primary School in the Ward. An additional primary school has been earmarked for Dago village unit. Plans are at an advanced stage to purchase the land through partnership with CDF and commence construction of the same. It has one proposed dispensary (Dago). There are two community halls i.e. one at chief's camp and the other one at assistant chief's office.

=== Economic Activities ===
Small scale Farming at Nyamthoe i.e. maize cabbages, water melon, pili pili Hoho, paper, and indigenous vegetables. There are fish farming activities i.e. fish ponds. The poverty index has been reduced from 2007 - research done by millennium cities 2012 with slight improvement.

== Social amenities ==
Piped water & electricity are available, however not all households have them.

The poor access roads are a major priority for the ward development committee as captured in the Nyalenda "A" Ward strategic document(2013 - 2017).

== Milestones ==
The first elective ward to formulate a people-driven strategic plan.

Nyalenda ‘A’ ward have developed a blueprint (strategic plan for the financial year 2013-2017). Information collected from various village units which were achieved through a grass root driven process involving the village unit Barazas, various stake holders within Nyalenda including learning institutions. The document has been shared with the stake holders in several consultative forums.

Notable People from Nyalenda.

The document is available to all existing and potential strategic partners and investors at the ward office. The ward has an official Facebook fun page and plans are advanced stage to develop a website.
