= Houston Hurricanes =

Defunct American soccer club

The Houston Hurricanes were a soccer club that competed in the United Soccer Leagues from 1996 to 2000.

== Description and history ==
The Hurricanes were a Division III (D-3) franchise, and their Major League Soccer affiliation was with the Kansas City Wizards owned by Joseph "Joey" Marc Serralta Ives and family making him the first Puerto Rican to own a professional sports franchise in the United States. Attendance averaged about 1,000 or less per game for the club's five seasons, and the franchise ceased playing in the USISL after the 2000 season and participated in the Lone Star Alliance before folding in 2001. The team's most successful season was 1997, when they reached .500 in the regular season and won the 1997 Divisional Championship before losing its Regional Championship game to the San Francisco Bay Seals. The team was coached by Mario Deglinocenti in 1996, Richard Pardo 1997, Marty Espinoza 1998, Vieira 1999, Jaime Rodriguez 2000 and Luis Morales in 2001. The team played its home games at Butler Stadium in Houston.

== Year-by-year ==
Year	Division	League	Reg. season	Playoffs	Open Cup	Stadium
1996	3	USISL Pro League	5-11, 5th, Central	Lost in first round	did not qualify	Butler Stadium/Delmar Stadium
1997	3	USISL D-3 Pro League	9-9, 3rd, South Central	South Central Div Champions, Lost Regional Championship game	did not qualify	Robertson Stadium
1998	3	USISL D-3 Pro League	7-11, 5th, South Central	Lost in first round	did not qualify	Butler Stadium
1999	3	USL D-3 Pro League	5-13, 8th, Western	did not qualify	did not qualify	Butler Stadium
2000	3	USL D-3 Pro League	8-9-1, 5th, Southern	did not qualify	did not qualify	Butler Stadium
2001	3	Lone Star Alliance	7-7	'Semi-Finals'	did not qualify	Butler Stadium/Delmar Stadium

2012 Houston Hurricanes join NPSL Owner - Brendan Keyes. Head Coach - Brendan Keyes
