= West Virginia Wildfire =

Women's American football team

- Founded: 2008
- League: Women's Spring Football League
- Team history: West Virginia Wonders (NWFA) 2008; West Virginia WildKats (WFA) 2009 planning stages West Virginia Wildfire (Women's Spring Football League) (2011-present)
- Based in: Belle, West Virginia, USA
- Stadium: Warrior Stadium
- Colors
- President: Kimberly Koontz
- Head coach: Bob Koontz
- Championships: 2

The West Virginia Wildfire is a women's American football team in the Women's Spring Football League since 2011. The first women's football team in West Virginia, the Wildfire is based in the city of Belle.

In their inaugural season, the WildKats were known as the West Virginia Wonders and played in the National Women's Football Association. After that inaugural season, the team was originally set to play in the Women's Football Alliance for 2009 as the West Virginia WildKats, but then they decided to take the next two seasons off to reorganize further.

In 2012, the Wildfire won their first ever championship, winning the WSFL's 8-man division title.
In 2013, the Wildfire beat the Binghamton Tigercats 44–8 to win their second consecutive WSFL 8-man title.

== Season-by-season ==
Season records
Season	W	L	T	Finish	Playoff results
West Virginia Wonders (NWFA)
2008	0	8	0	4th North Central	--
2009	Did not play				
2010	Did not play				
West Virginia Wildfire (WSFL)
2011	0	3	1	--	--
2012	5	2	0	1st 8-man division	Champions
2013	6	0	0	1st 8-man division	Champions
Totals	11	13	1	(including playoffs)	

West Virginia Wonders (2008)

West Virginia WildKats (planned logo)

West Virginia Wildfire (2011-future)
