= United States Women's Football League =

Women's American football minor league

- Sport: Women's American football
- Founded: 2009
- No. of teams: 6 for 2023 season
- Country: United States
- Most recent champion: River City Sting (2021 season)

The United States Women's Football League (USWFL) is a full-contact women's American football minor league that opened with exhibition play in 2010 and subsequently played its first regular season in 2011. The league was known as the "Women's Spring Football League" from 2009 to 2015.

The USWFL played with 11-player and 8-player divisions from 2011 through 2013. In 2014, the league split into two leagues, with the 11-woman division retaining the WSFL name and the 8-woman division taking the name the Women's Eights Football League (W8FL). In 2016, the league played only 11-woman football with the Cincinnati Sizzle taking the league crown.

== History ==
=== United States Women's Football League (USWFL) ===
The USWFL was founded as the Women's Spring Football League in 2009. A few teams played an exhibition season under the WSFL banner in 2010, with the Kansas City Storm going undefeated in the regular season but no playoffs or league championship game were played resulting in no league champion being crowned.

In 2011, the USWFL played what it regards as its first official regular season. The Baltimore Burn finished the season with a 6–0 record against non-league foes and claimed the 2011 WSFL championship on the basis of regular season record.

In 2012, the USWFL staged its first playoffs and held its first league championship game at Endless Mountains Stadium in Towanda, Pennsylvania. The New Jersey Titans defeated the DFW Xtreme, 67–6, to claim the 2012 WSFL championship.

In 2013, the USWFL staged its second playoffs and held its second league championship game in Memphis, Tennessee. The Memphis Dynasty defeated the Arkansas Banshees, 32–12, to claim the title.

In 2014, the USWFL staged its third playoffs and held its third league championship game in Erie, Pennsylvania. The Memphis Dynasty defeated the Arkansas Banshees, 34–12, to claim their second straight WSFL championship.

In 2015, the USWFL staged its fourth playoffs and held its fourth league championship game in Hummelstown, Pennsylvania. The Keystone Assault defeated the Tennessee Legacy, 9–7, to claim their first WSFL championship.
In 2016, the Cincinnati Sizzle defeated the New England Nightmare 30–6 at Horn Lake, Mississippi to claim their first league championship.
In 2017, the Washington Prodigy beat the Houston Wildcats 44–0 to win the league championship game in Bristol, Tennessee. In the Ironwoman Championship the Tri-Cities Thunder beat the West Virginia Wildfire 28–0.

In 2018, the Washington Prodigy repeats and defeat the North Florida Pumas 20–0 to win the Division II championship game in Bristol, Tennessee. In the Ironwoman Championship the Hampton Roads Lady Gators defeated the Tri-Cities Thunder 20–14

In 2019, the Washington Prodigy beat the Keystone Assault 39–0 to win their 3rd straight USWFL D2 championship in Bluff City, Tennessee. The Tri-Cities Thunder won their 2nd Ironwoman Championship by beating the Hampton Roads Lady Gators 32–6

=== Women's Eights Football League (W8FL) ===
The WSFL started an eight-woman division in 2011. The Cape Fear Thunder claimed the WSFL's first eight-player division championship with a 4–2–1 regular season record.

In 2012, the West Virginia Wildfire captured the WSFL title in the 8-player division with a 5–2 record.

In 2013, the WSFL held its first championship game in the eight-player division. The West Virginia Wildfire defeated the Binghamton Tiger Cats, 44–8, to claim their second straight championship in the eight-player division.

In 2014, the eight-player division spun off into its own league, taking the name the Women's Eights Football League (W8FL). The Cape Fear Thunder won their second eight-player championship by defeating the West Virginia Wildfire, 34–26, in the W8FL title game.
In 2015, the New York Knockout defeated the Cape Fear Thunder, 28–0, to win their first W8FL championship title, with the game having been played in Schenectady, New York.

== Teams ==
=== 2023 United States Women's Football League Teams (USWFL) ===
==== 2023 Season North Division Teams ====
| Team | Location | Home Field |
|---|---|---|
| Cincinnati Sizzle | Cincinnati, Ohio | Cincinnati Woodward High School |
| Detroit Prowl | Detroit Michigan | Allen Park High School |
| Michigan Queens | Detroit, Michigan | Plymouth Education Center |

==== 2023 Season South Division Teams ====
| Team | Location | Home Field |
|---|---|---|
| RVA Lady Tomahawks | Richmond, Virginia |
| South Carolina Scorpions | South Carolina |
| Tennessee Thunder | Tennessee |

== USWFL Championship Game Results ==
| Year | Winner | Loser | Score |
|---|---|---|---|
| 2011 | Baltimore Burn | Baltimore declared league champion with 6–0 record | no game played |
| 2012 | New Jersey Titans | Dallas/FortWorth Xtreme | 67–6 |
| 2013 | Memphis Dynasty | Arkansas Banshees | 32–12 |
| 2014 | Memphis Dynasty | Arkansas Banshees | 34–12 |
| 2015 | Keystone Assault | Tennessee Legacy | 9–7 |
| 2016 | Cincinnati Sizzle | New England Nightmare | 30–6 |
| 2017 | Washington Prodigy | Houston Wildcats | 44–0 |
| 2018 | Washington Prodigy | North Florida Pumas | 20–0 |
| 2019 | Washington Prodigy | Keystone Assault | 39–0 |
| 2020 | NO SEASON PLAYED COVID 19 | NO SEASON PLAYED COVID 19 | xxxx |
| 2021 | River City Sting | Tri-Cities Thunder | 21–15 |
| 2022 | NO SEASON PLAYED | NO SEASON PLAYED | xxxx |
| 2023 | Detroit Prowl | RVA Lady Tomahawks | 41–0 |

== USWFL IronWoman Championship Game Results 2017–2019 ==
| Year | Winner | Loser | Score |
|---|---|---|---|
| 2017 | Tri-Cities Thunder | West Virginia Wildfire | 28–0 |
| 2018 | Hampton Roads Lady Gators | Tri-Cities Thunder | 20–14 |
| 2019 | Tri-Cities Thunder | Hampton Roads Lady Gators | 32–6 |

== WSFL 8s Championship Game Results 2011–2015 ==
| Year | Winner | Loser | Score |
|---|---|---|---|
| 2011 | Cape Fear Thunder | Cape Fear declared league champion with 4–2–1 record | no game played |
| 2012 | West Virginia Wildfire | West Virginia declared league champion with 5–2 record | no game played |
| 2013 | West Virginia Wildfire | Binghamton Tiger Cats | 44–8 |
| 2014 | Cape Fear Thunder | West Virginia Wildfire | 34–26 |
| 2015 | New York Knockout | Cape Fear Thunder | 28–0 |

== Former USWFL and W8FL teams playing elsewhere ==
- Kansas City Storm – played in USWFL in 2010, then as an independent team, now a member of United Women's Football Association.
- Nevada Storm – played in USWFL from 2011 to 2012, then left to join Women's Football Alliance.
- Rocky Mountain Thunderkatz – played in USWFL in 2014, then returned to Women's Football Alliance.
