= Regals SCA =

American soccer club

Houston Regals SCA
- Full name: Houston Regals SCA
- Nickname: Regals
- Founded: 2009; 17 years ago
- Stadium: British International School of Houston
- Capacity: 1,000
- Owner: Miguel A Landaverde
- Chairman: Cristian Lopez
- Manager: Miguel Landaverde
- League: The League for Clubs (2026)

Houston Regals is a men's American soccer club based in Houston, Texas that played in the national soccer league . After a one-year hiatus, the club announced their return to the NPSL for the 2015 season in December 2014. The club again competed in NPSL in 2016, drawing their first match with Fort Worth Vaqueros, and finishing 9th in the NPSL's 11-team South Central Conference.

On December 12, 2016, Houston Regals announced open tryouts for the 2017, confirming that they would again be competing in NPSL for the 2017 season.

== Year-by-year ==
Year	Division	League	Regular	Playoffs	Open Cup
2010	N/A	USASA	2nd state cup region 3	Yes	yes
2013	4th	NPSL	3rd, South Central	Did not qualify	Did not qualify
2014	N/A	TPSL	2nd, TPSL	Won TPSL Championship	Did not quality
2015	4th	NPSL	7th, South Central	Did not quality	Did not quality
2016	4th	NPSL	9th, South Central	Did not qualify	Did not qualify
2016	N/A	USASA	Texas South Champion	Did not qualify	Did not qualify
2017	4th	NPSL	9th, South Central	Did not qualify	Did not qualify
2018	4th	NPSL	6th, South Central	Did not qualify	Did not qualify
2021	4th	NSL	1st, Place, NSL	Won fall championship	Did not qualify
2022	4th	NSL	1st, Place, NSL	Won Spring Championship	Did Not qualify
2023	4th	USSL	1st, Place, USSL	Won Fall Championship	Did not qualify
2024	4th	USSL	1st, Place, USSL	Won Spring Championship	4th round qualifiers

== Honors ==
- USASA
  - American Champions Cup Runner Up (1): 2024
- NSL
  - NSL Fall Championship : 2021
  - NSL Spring Championship 2022
- USSL
  - USSL Fall Championship 2023
  - USSL Spring Championship 2024
- USSSA
  - USSSA National Championship 2022
  - USSSA National Championship 2024
  - USSSA National Championship 2025
