= Connecticut Cyclones =

American football team

- Founded: 2005
- League: Women's Football Alliance
- Team history: WPFL (2006-2007); IWFL (2008); WFA (2009-2010)
- Based in: Hartford, Connecticut
- Stadium: TBA
- Colors: Royal blue, sky blue
- President: DaShawn Robinson
- Head coach: Ed Whitley
- Championships: 0

The Connecticut Cyclones is a team of the Women's Football Alliance. Based in Hartford, the Cyclones played two seasons in the Women's Professional Football League and one in the Independent Women's Football League before joining the WFA (while they were based in West Haven).

Originally scheduled to begin play in 2009, the Cyclones have since pushed back their inaugural WFA season to 2010, forfeiting their entire 2009 schedule in the process.

== Season-By-Season ==
Season records
Season	W	L	T	Finish	Playoff results
Connecticut Cyclones (WPFL)
2006	0	5	0	3rd American East	--
2007	0	7	0	3rd American East	--
Connecticut Cyclones (IWFL)
2008	0	4	0	X-Team	--
Connecticut Cyclones (WFA)
2009	0	8	0	6th National Northeast	--
Totals	0	24	0	(including playoffs)	
