= Fall 2021 Chattanooga FC season =

American soccer team season

Chattanooga FC
2021 season
- Managing director: Jeremy Alumbaugh
- Head coach: Peter Fuller
- Stadium: Finley Stadium; Chattanooga, Tennessee
- NISA: TBD
- Highest home attendance: 2,916 (Aug. 7 vs. STU)
- Lowest home attendance: 1,960 (Sept. 18 vs. SDG)
- Average home league attendance: 2,198
- Biggest win: CFC 3–0 MAR (Aug. 21)
- Biggest defeat: NAM 2–1 CFC (Aug. 14)
Home colors	Away colors

The Fall 2021 Chattanooga FC season was the club's third professional season playing in the National Independent Soccer Association and 14th overall since being established in 2009.

== Roster ==
=== Players ===
As of July 31, 2021

No.	Position	Nation	Player
1	GK	USA	Alec Redington
2	FW	USA	Ryan Marcano
3	DF	USA	Shaun Russell
4	DF	JAM	Richard Dixon
6	MF	USA	Nick Spielman
7	MF	USA	Tate Robertson
9	FW	NOR	Markus Naglestad
10	MF	ESP	Juan Hernandez
11	MF	USA	Christopher Marshall
13	MF	USA	Cutler Coleman
14	FW	USA	Brian Bement
15	DF	USA	Angel Hurtado
16	MF	USA	Ricardo Bahena
17	FW	USA	Daniel Jackson
20	FW	USA	Brett Jones
21	DF	USA	James Kasak
22	MF	USA	Cameron Woodfin
23	GK	USA	Nick Nelson
24	FW	USA	Sean Hoffstatter
28	MF	USA	Damian Rodriguez
31	MF	USA	Alec McKinley
66	DF	USA	Kaio DaSilva
77	GK	USA	Phillip D’Amico

=== Technical staff ===
Technical staff
Technical Director	(United States) Bill Elliott
Head Coach	(United States) Peter Fuller
Director of Soccer Operations	(United States) Jordan Mattheiss
Assistant Coach	(United States) Drew Courtney

== Transfers ==
=== Out ===
#	Pos.	Player	Signed from	Details	Date	Source
28	MF	(United States) Damian Rodriguez	(United States) North Georgia Soccer Academy	Academy contract	July 2021	
17	FW	(United States) Daniel Jackson	(United States) Tormenta FC	Academy contract	August 13, 2021	

=== Out ===
#	Pos.	Player	Signed by	Details	Date	Source
5	MF	(United States) Kyle Carr	Unattached	Not re-signed	July 6	
8	MF	(United States) Ian McGrath	Unattached	Not re-signed	July 6	
17	FW	(Brazil) Felipe Oliveira	Unattached	Not re-signed	July 26	
51	GK	(United States) Michael Barrueta	(United States) Chattanooga Red Wolves Academy	Not re-signed		

== Friendlies ==
July 7 Friendly	Chattanooga FC	3–2	Appalachian FC	Chattanooga, Tennessee
7:30 p.m. EDT	McKinley (yellow card) 25'; Naglestad 31', 51'; Coleman (yellow card) 45'; Oliveira 58'	Broadcast	Fabricio 21'; van den Bergh 26'; Bates (yellow card) 35'; Kellman (yellow card) 89'	Stadium: Finley Stadium; Referee: Carlos Pielago

July 21 Friendly	Appalachian FC	3–3	Chattanooga FC	Boone, North Carolina
8:00 p.m. EDT	Holbrook 90+4' (Pen.); Rogers (yellow card) 69'; Fabricio 82', 90'; Kurz (yellow card) 86'	Broadcast	Hernandez 4' (Pen.), (yellow card) 88'; Spielman (yellow card) 31'; Jones 33'; McKinley (yellow card) 45+4' (yellow-red card) 50'; Trialist #1 90+2'; Trialist #2 (yellow card) 90+8'	Stadium: Ted Mackorell Soccer Complex; Attendance: 1,100

== Competitions ==
=== NISA Independent Cup ===
Details for the 2021 NISA Independent Cup were released on June 10. Chattanooga were placed in the Southeast Region for the second straight year along with three United Premier Soccer League teams; Savannah Clovers FC, Soda City FC (both of which took part in the 2020 edition), and 2020 Fall UPSL Champion Atletico Atlanta.

Chattanooga won the regional title for a second straight season after two matches following a win at Savanah and a tie between Soda City and Atlanta.

==== Standings ====
Pos	Team	Pld	W	D	L	GF	GA	GD	Pts
1	Chattanooga FC (C)	3	3	0	0	10	0	+10	9
2	Atletico Atlanta	3	0	2	1	5	6	−1	2
3	Savannah Clovers FC	3	0	2	1	5	9	−4	2
4	Soda City FC	3	0	2	1	2	7	−5	2

Source: nisaofficial.com
Rules for classification: 1) points; 2) goal differential; 3) goals for; 4) head-to-head
(C) Champions

==== Matches ====
July 10 Match 1	Chattanooga FC	1–0	Atletico Atlanta	Chattanooga, Tennessee
7:30 p.m. EDT	Naglestad 11'; Dixon (yellow card) 22'; Robertson (yellow card) 29' (yellow-red card) 89'; Spielman (yellow card) 90+3'	Broadcast	Profit (yellow card) 75'; Koloko (yellow card) 90+3'	Stadium: Finley Stadium; Attendance: 2,094; Referee: Carlos Pielago

July 17 Match 2	Savannah Clovers FC	0–4	Chattanooga FC	Savannah, Georgia
7:00 p.m. EDT	Guerrero (yellow card) 78'	Broadcast	Oliveira 19'; Naglestad 23', 35'; Dixon (yellow card) 43'; Kasak (yellow card) 56'; Woodfin 84'	Stadium: Memorial Stadium; Attendance: 300

July 24 Match 3	Chattanooga FC	5–0	Soda City FC	Chattanooga, Tennessee
7:30 p.m. EDT	Naglestad 7', 45'; Jones 15'; Hernandez 68'; Bement 88'	Broadcast	Flores (yellow card) 52'; Bravo (yellow card) 73'; Daniel (yellow card) 78'	Stadium: Finley Stadium; Referee: Amin Hadzic

=== National Independent Soccer Association season ===
Details regarding the Fall season were released on June 16.

==== Standings ====
Pos	Team	Pld	W	D	L	GF	GA	GD	Pts
1	Detroit City FC (C)	18	14	3	1	35	10	+25	45 (Note: The November 13 match between the LA Force and Detroit City FC was cancelled due to several players testing positive for COVID-19. The match was declared a 0-0 draw.)
2	California United Strikers FC	18	9	6	3	31	20	+11	33
3	Los Angeles Force	18	7	9	2	20	14	+6	30
4	New Amsterdam FC	18	7	2	9	29	29	0	23
5	Chattanooga FC	18	7	2	9	20	21	−1	23
6	Chicago House AC	18	7	2	9	18	26	−8	23
7	Michigan Stars FC	18	5	6	7	24	24	0	21
8	Stumptown AC	18	4	8	6	13	18	−5	20
9	Maryland Bobcats FC	18	5	5	8	20	28	−8	20
10	San Diego 1904 FC	18	2	3	13	17	37	−20	9

Source: nisasoccer.com
Rules for classification: 1) points; 2) goal differential; 3) goals scored; 4) head-to-head
(C) Champions

==== Results summary ====
Overall								Home						Away					
Pld	W	D	L	GF	GA	GD	Pts	W	D	L	GF	GA	GD	W	D	L	GF	GA	GD
7	2	1	4	10	10	0	7	2	1	2	8	5	+3	0	0	2	2	5	−3

Last updated: September 18, 2021.
Source: Match reports

==== Matches ====
August 7 1	Chattanooga FC	3–1	Stumptown AC	Chattanooga, Tennessee
7:30 p.m. EDT	Jones 77'; Hoffstatter 81'; Bement 90' (Pen.); Hernandez (yellow card) 90+4'	Report; Broadcast	Garcia Sosa 19'; Shibata (yellow card) 56'	Stadium: Finley Stadium; Attendance: 2,916; Referee: Jose Lara
Note: Hernandez yellow card missing from report, shown on broadcast, report times ahead by a few minutes

August 14 2	New Amsterdam FC	2–1	Chattanooga FC	Hempstead, New York
7:00 p.m. EDT	Malango 16'; Vicente (yellow card) 35'; John-Brown 44'; Bosua (yellow card) 66' (yellow-red card) 90'; Waugh (yellow card) 71'; Diosa (yellow card) 81'; Barone (yellow card) 90+2'	Report; Broadcast	Jones 85'; Dixon (yellow card) 87'	Stadium: Hofstra Soccer Stadium; Attendance: 333; Referee: Jervis Atagana
Note: Dixon's card misreported as going to NAFC's Ojai Bedward on report, but correctly shown on broadcast (both players wear #4)

August 21 3	Chattanooga FC	3–0	Maryland Bobcats FC	Chattanooga, Tennessee
7:30 p.m. EDT	Jackson 14', 74'; Robertson (yellow card) 52'; Hernandez 70' (Pen.); Bement (yellow card) 90+3'	Report; Broadcast	Dawkins (yellow card) 35'; Caulker (red card) 65'	Stadium: Finley Stadium; Attendance: 2,008
Note: Dawkins card missing from match report, shown/heard on broadcast

August 28 4	Chattanooga FC	0–1	Los Angeles Force	Chattanooga, Tennessee
7:00 p.m. EDT	Russell (yellow card) 74'; Kasak (yellow card) 78'	Report; Broadcast	Barrera 48' (Pen.); Alvarado (yellow card) 86'	Stadium: Finley Stadium; Attendance: 2,158; Referee: Daniel Gutierrez
Note: Card shown to Chattanooga bench at 45+1'

September 4 5	Chattanooga FC	1–2	Detroit City FC	Chattanooga, Tennessee
7:30 p.m. EDT	Russell (yellow card) 26'; Kasak (yellow card) 39'; Naglestad 55'; McKinley (yellow card) 58'; Dixon (red card) 63'	Report; Broadcast	Faz 42'; Lewis (yellow card) 45'; Matthews 88'	Stadium: Finley Stadium; Attendance: 1,946; Referee: Aleksandar Zhelyazkov
Note: Russell and McKinley yellows missing from report, shown on broadcast, Chattanooga 90th min sub missing from report (Rodriguez IN, Kasak OUT), shown in broadcast.

September 11 6	Los Angeles Force	3–1	Chattanooga FC	Santa Ana, California
7:00 p.m. PDT	Barrera 24', 70'; Casillas 88' (Pen.)	Report; Broadcast	Hoffstatter 30'; Mckinley (yellow card) 44'; Hernandez (yellow card) 70'; Woodfin (yellow card) 83'; Nelson (yellow card) 87'	Stadium: Valley High School; Attendance: 175; Referee: Luis Diego Arroyo
Note: Report missing Chattanooga substitution in 53' (Woodfin IN, Robertson OUT), heard by PA in broadcast

September 18 7	Chattanooga FC	1–1	San Diego 1904 FC	Chattanooga, Tennessee
7:30 p.m. EDT	McKinley (yellow card) 54'; Robertson (yellow card) 77'; Naglestad 88'	Report; Broadcast	Cutler (yellow card) 23'; Benito (yellow card) 90+1', (goal) 90+5'	Stadium: Finley Stadium; Attendance: 1,960; Referee: Aleksandar Zhelyazkov
Note: Report missing Chattanooga substitution in 87' (Bement IN, Jackson OUT), shown in broadcast

September 25 8	San Diego 1904 FC	v	Chattanooga FC	Pacific Highlands Ranch, San Diego
7:00 p.m. PDT				Stadium: Canyon Crest Stadium

October 3 9	California United Strikers FC	v	Chattanooga FC	Irvine, California
4:00 p.m. PDT				Stadium: Championship Soccer Stadium

October 7 10	Chattanooga FC	v	California United Strikers FC	Chattanooga, Tennessee
7:00 p.m. EDT				Stadium: Finley Stadium

October 13 11	Chicago House AC	v	Chattanooga FC	Bridgeview, Illinois
7:30 p.m. CDT				Stadium: SeatGeek Stadium

October 17 12	Michigan Stars FC	v	Chattanooga FC	Washington, Michigan
3:30 p.m. EDT				Stadium: Romeo High School Stadium

October 23 13	Chattanooga FC	v	New Amsterdam FC	Chattanooga, Tennessee
7:30 p.m. EDT				Stadium: Finley Stadium

October 30 14	Maryland Bobcats FC	v	Chattanooga FC	Germantown, Maryland
7:30 p.m. EDT				Stadium: Maryland SoccerPlex

November 3 15	Chattanooga FC	v	Chicago House AC	Chattanooga, Tennessee
7:00 p.m. EDT				Stadium: Finley Stadium

November 6 16	Detroit City FC	v	Chattanooga FC	Hamtramck, Michigan
4:00 p.m. EDT				Stadium: Keyworth Stadium

November 13 17	Chattanooga FC	v	Michigan Stars FC	Chattanooga, Tennessee
7:30 p.m. EST				Stadium: Finley Stadium

November 20 18	Stumptown AC	v	Chattanooga FC	Matthews, North Carolina
7:00 p.m. EDT				Stadium: Sportsplex at Matthews

== Squad statistics ==
As of Match played September 18, 2021

=== Appearances and goals ===
No.	Pos	Nat	Player	Total		Regular season	
No.	Pos	Nat	Player	Apps	Goals	Apps	Goals
Goalkeepers
1	GK	(United States) USA	Alec Redington	6	0	6+0	0
23	GK	(United States) USA	Nick Nelson	1	0	1+0	0
77	GK	(United States) USA	Phillip D’Amico	0	0	0+0	0
Defenders
3	DF	(United States) USA	Shaun Russell	7	0	7+0	0
4	DF	(Jamaica) JAM	Richard Dixon	6	0	6+0	0
15	DF	(United States) USA	Angel Hurtado	0	0	0+0	0
21	DF	(United States) USA	James Kasak	7	0	7+0	0
66	DF	(United States) USA	Kaio DaSilva	3	0	1+2	0
Midfielders
5	MF	(United States) USA	Kyle Carr	0	0	0+0	0
6	MF	(United States) USA	Nick Spielman	7	0	7+0	0
7	MF	(United States) USA	Tate Robertson	7	0	7+0	0
8	MF	(United States) USA	Ian McGrath	0	0	0+0	0
10	MF	(Spain) ESP	Juan Hernandez	7	1	7+0	1
11	MF	(United States) USA	Christopher Marshall	4	0	0+4	0
13	MF	(United States) USA	Cutler Coleman	3	0	1+2	0
16	MF	(United States) USA	Ricardo Bahena	0	0	0+0	0
22	MF	(United States) USA	Cameron Woodfin	6	0	2+4	0
28	MF	(United States) USA	Damien Rodriguez	5	0	2+3	0
31	MF	(United States) USA	Alec McKinley	4	0	3+1	0
Forwards
2	FW	(United States) USA	Ryan Marcano	1	0	0+1	0
9	FW	(Norway) NOR	Markus Naglestad	3	2	2+1	2
14	FW	(United States) USA	Brian Bement	6	1	2+4	1
17	FW	(United States) USA	Daniel Jackson	6	2	5+1	2
20	FW	(United States) USA	Brett Jones	4	2	4+0	2
24	FW	(United States) USA	Sean Hoffstatter	7	2	7+0	2

=== Goal scorers ===
Place	Position	Nation	Number	Name	Regular season
1	FW	(Norway)	9	Markus Naglestad	2
1	FW	(United States)	17	Daniel Jackson	2
1	FW	(United States)	20	Brett Jones	2
1	FW	(United States)	24	Sean Hoffstatter	2
2	MF	(Spain)	10	Juan Hernandez	1
2	FW	(United States)	14	Brian Bement	1

=== Disciplinary record ===
Number	Nation	Position	Name	Regular season	
Number	Nation	Position	Name	Booked	Sent off (straight red)
3	(United States)	DF	Shaun Russell	2	0
4	(Jamaica)	DF	Richard Dixon	1	1
7	(United States)	MF	Tate Robertson	2	0
10	(Spain)	MF	Juan Hernandez	2	0
14	(United States)	FW	Brian Bement	1	0
21	(United States)	DF	James Kasak	2	0
22	(United States)	MF	Cameron Woodfin	1	0
23	(United States)	GK	Nick Nelson	1	0
31	(United States)	MF	Alec McKinley	3	0
