= 2020–21 Chattanooga FC season =

American soccer team season

Chattanooga FC
2020–21 NISA season
- Managing director: Jeremy Alumbaugh
- Head coach: Peter Fuller
- Stadium: Finley Stadium; Chattanooga, Tennessee
- NISA: Fall: 1st Spring: 6th
- Playoffs: Fall: Semifinal; Spring: Semifinal
- Legends Cup: Runner-up
- U.S. Open Cup: Did not qualify
- Top goalscorer: League: 3 each: Zeca Ferraz; Ian McGrath; All: Ian McGrath: 6
- Highest home attendance: League: 3,231 (May 29 vs. MBFC)
- Lowest home attendance: League: 517 (Sept. 16 vs. NAFC)
- Average home league attendance: Fall: 718; Spring: 2,691
- Biggest win: CFC 3–0 NAFC (Sept. 16); CFC 4–1 LAF (Apr. 13, Legends Cup); NAFC 0–3 CFC (Apr. 16, Legends Cup)
- Biggest defeat: CFC 0–3 DCFC (Apr. 25, Legends Cup)
Home colors	Away colors

The 2020–21 Chattanooga FC season was the club's second professional season playing in the National Independent Soccer Association, its first full season in NISA, and 13th overall since being established in 2009.

== Club ==
=== Roster ===
As of April 26, 2021

No.	Position	Nation	Player
1	GK	USA	Alec Redington
2	FW	USA	Ryan Marcano
3	DF	USA	Shaun Russell
4	DF	JAM	Richard Dixon
5	MF	USA	Kyle Carr
6	MF	USA	Nick Spielman
7	MF	USA	Tate Robertson
8	MF	USA	Ian McGrath
9	FW	NOR	Markus Naglestad
10	MF	ESP	Juan Hernandez
11	MF	USA	Christopher Marshall
13	MF	USA	Cutler Coleman
14	FW	USA	Brian Bement
15	DF	USA	Angel Hurtado
16	MF	USA	Ricardo Bahena
17	FW	BRA	Felipe Oliveira
20	FW	USA	Brett Jones
21	DF	USA	James Kasak
22	MF	USA	Cameron Woodfin
23	GK	USA	Nick Nelson
24	FW	USA	Sean Hoffstatter
31	MF	USA	Alec McKinley
51	GK	USA	Michael Barrueta
66	DF	USA	Kaio DaSilva
77	GK	USA	Phillip D’Amico

=== Technical staff ===
Technical staff
Technical Director	(United States) Bill Elliott
Head Coach	(United States) Peter Fuller
Director of Soccer Operations	(United States) Jordan Mattheiss
Assistant Coach	(United States) Drew Courtney

=== Equipment ===
The club wore different kits for the 2020 and 2021 portions of the season. Hummel was the supplier and Volkswagen was the sponsor in the fall. For the spring, Louisiana Hot Sauce sponsored the home kit while German Bundesliga side VfL Wolfsburg sponsored the away kit.

2020 Fall Competitions		2021 Spring Competitions	
Home	Away	Home	Away

== Transfers ==
=== In ===
#	Pos.	Player	Signed from	Details	Date	Source
4	FW	(Brazil) Zeca Ferraz	Unattached	Free transfer	July 10, 2020	
88	FW	(Guatemala) Darwin Lom	(Guatemala) C.D. Guastatoya	Free transfer	July 10, 2020	
1	GK	(United States) Matt Mozynski	(Canada) Thunder Bay Chill	Free transfer	July 10, 2020	
		19 Returning Players	(United States) Chattanooga FC	Re-signed	July 10, 2020	
42	MF	(Cameroon) David Koloko	(United States) Stumptown Athletic	Free transfer	August 7, 2020	
15	DF	(United States) Shaun Russell	(United States) Forward Madison FC	Free transfer	August 7, 2020	
3	DF	(Liberia) Wilfred Williams	(United States) Oakland Roots SC	Free transfer	August 31, 2020	
13	MF	(United States) Cutler Coleman	(United States) Amherst Mammoths	Free transfer	September 25, 2020	
		14 Returning Players	(United States) Chattanooga FC	Re-signed	January 14, 2021	
7	MF	(United States) Tate Robertson	(United States) Stumptown Athletic	Free transfer	January 28, 2021	
77	GK	(United States) Phillip D’Amico	Unattached	Free transfer	February 2, 2021	
21	DF	(United States) James Kasak	(United States) Virginia Tech Hokies	Free transfer	February 10, 2021	
9	FW	(Norway) Markus Naglestad	(United States) Hartford Athletic	Free transfer	February 16, 2021	
51	GK	(United States) Michael Barrueta	(United States) Chattanooga Red Wolves SC Academy	Free transfer	February 24, 2021	
15	DF	(Guatemala) Angel Hurtado	(United States) North Georgia Soccer Academy	Free transfer	February 24, 2021	
16	MF	(United States) Ricardo Bahena	(United States) North Georgia Soccer Academy	Free transfer	February 24, 2021	
17	FW	(Brazil) Felipe Oliveira	Unattached	Free transfer	March 1, 2021	
66	DF	(United States) Kaio DaSilva	(United States) Albany Great Danes	Free transfer	April 12, 2021	
20	FW	(United States) Brett Jones	(United States) Oregon State Beavers	Free transfer	April 12, 2021	
23	GK	(United States) Nick Nelson	Unattached	Free transfer	May 29, 2021	

=== Out ===
#	Pos.	Player	Signed to	Details	Date	Source
3	DF	(Haiti) Jerry Saint-Vil	Unattached	Free transfer	July 10, 2020	
1	GK	(United States) Phillip D’Amico	Unattached	Free transfer	July 10, 2020	
8	FW	(Brazil) Joao Costa	Unattached	Free transfer	July 10, 2020	
4	DF	(Spain) Juan Sanchez	Unattached	Free transfer	July 10, 2020	
88	MF	(Costa Rica) Daniel Valenciano	Unattached	Free transfer	July 10, 2020	
15	DF	(United States) Sean Reynolds	Unattached	Free transfer	July 10, 2020	
21	DF	(Canada) Jordan Dunstan	(Canada) Forge FC	Free transfer	July 31, 2020	
2	DF	(United States) Raymond Lee	(United States) Pittsburgh Riverhounds SC	Undisclosed fee	August 5, 2020	
4	FW	(Brazil) Zeca Ferraz	Unattached	Retired	October 24, 2020	
1	GK	(United States) Matt Mozynski	Unattached	Not re-signed	January 14, 2021	
3	DF	(Liberia) Wilfred Williams	Unattached	Not re-signed	January 14, 2021	
9	FW	(United States) Santiago Agudelo	Unattached	Not re-signed	January 14, 2021	
11	FW	(United States) Kaleb Jackson	Unattached	Not re-signed	January 14, 2021	
17	MF	(Jamaica) Jowayne Laidley	Unattached	Not re-signed	January 14, 2021	
42	MF	(Cameroon) David Koloko	Unattached	Not re-signed	January 14, 2021	
64	DF	(New Zealand) Erik Panzer	Unattached	Not re-signed	January 14, 2021	
7	FW	(United States) Clayton Adams	(United States) South Georgia Tormenta FC	Not re-signed	February 18, 2021	
88	FW	(Guatemala) Darwin Lom	(United States) California United Strikers FC	Not re-signed	March 24, 2021	
24	DF	(Netherlands) Soren Yuhaschek	(United States) New Orleans Jesters	Not re-signed	March 25, 2021	

== Friendlies ==
October 17, 2020 Friendly	Chattanooga FC	5–2	Metro Louisville FC	Chattanooga, Tennessee
7:30 p.m. EDT	Lom 17' (pen.); Adams 25'; McGrath 40', 60'; Bement (penalty missed) 53', (yellow card) 81', (goal) 84'	Broadcast	Hilliard 4'; Sandoval (yellow card) 16'; Rojas (penalty missed) 35'; Harmon 45+2'	Stadium: Finley Stadium; Referee: Carlos Pielago

October 24, 2020 Friendly	Chattanooga FC	0–1	Maryland Bobcats FC	Chattanooga, Tennessee
7:30 p.m. EDT	Spielman (yellow card) 38'	Broadcast	Forka (yellow card) 16'; Kao 19', (yellow card) 28'; Banjo (yellow card) 38'; Moussi (yellow card) 46'; Jawara (yellow card) 61'; Isyaq (yellow card) 90+1'	Stadium: Finley Stadium

March 13, 2021 Preseason	Birmingham Legion FC	2–0	Chattanooga FC	Birmingham, Alabama
5:00 p.m. CST	Trialist; Flemmings	Report		Stadium: BBVA Field; Attendance: 0
Note: Scrimmage played behind closed doors

March 20, 2021 Preseason	Chattanooga FC	v	Kalonji Soccer Academy	Chattanooga, Tennessee
6:00 p.m. EDT		Report		Stadium: Finley Stadium; Attendance: 0
Note: Scrimmage results not published, played behind closed doors

March 24, 2021 Preseason	Atlanta United FC	3–1	Chattanooga FC	Marietta, Georgia
6:00 p.m. EDT	López; Robinson; Martínez	ATL Report; CFC Report	Naglestad	Stadium: Children's Healthcare of Atlanta Training Ground; Attendance: 0
Note: Scrimmage played behind closed doors

April 3, 2021 Preseason	Chattanooga FC	2–3	Louisville City FC	Chattanooga, Tennessee
2:00 p.m. EDT	Hoffstatter 10'; Brown (yellow card) 73'; Hernandez 74', (red card) 86'	Chattanooga Report; Louisville Report	(yellow card) 42'; DelPiccolo 66'; McLaughlin 73'; Lancaster 83'	Stadium: Finley Stadium; Attendance: 1,767

May 15, 2021 Friendly	North Alabama SC	0–2	Chattanooga FC	Huntsville, Alabama
5:00 p.m. EDT		Report; Broadcast	Robertson 4'; Jones 12'; Carr (yellow card) 41'	Stadium: John Hunt Park

May 19, 2021 Friendly	Georgia Revolution FC	1–2	Chattanooga FC	McDonough, Georgia
7:00 p.m. EDT	Carmichael 38'; Tambadu (yellow card) 62'	Broadcast	Hoffstatter 33'; Coleman (yellow card) 62'; Marcano 78'	Stadium: Henry County High School

== Competitions ==
=== NISA Independent Cup ===
Chattanooga was announced as one of the four NISA teams taking part in the inaugural NISA Independent Cup on July 1. The regional tournament is set to act as both a pre-season and chance to "provide a platform for professional and amateur independent clubs to play together on a national stage."

The team was drawn into the Southeast Region alongside former National Premier Soccer League rival Georgia Revolution FC and United Premier Soccer League sides Savannah Clovers FC and Soda City FC. Games will be played between Chattanooga's home field at Finley Stadium and two venues in South Carolina, with both the region's championship game and third place games taking place at Finley on August 1.

==== Standings ====
Pos	Team	Pld	W	D	L	GF	GA	GD	Pts
1	Chattanooga FC (C)	3	3	0	0	9	1	+8	9
2	Soda City FC	3	1	1	1	4	6	−2	4
3	Savannah Clovers FC	3	1	0	2	2	5	−3	3
4	Georgia Revolution FC	3	0	1	2	3	6	−3	1

Source: nisaofficial.com
(C) Champions

==== Matches ====
July 11, 2020 Match 1	Chattanooga FC	3–1	Georgia Revolution FC	Chattanooga, Tennessee
8:00 p.m. EDT	McGrath 9'; Bement 41', 60'; Ferraz (yellow card) 45'	Report; Broadcast	Fidler 13'; Rainey (yellow card) 43'; (yellow card) 57'	Stadium: Finley Stadium; Attendance: 0
Note: Game was played behind closed doors due to the COVID-19 pandemic, first Chattanooga FC game to be broadcast live on local television (via WFLI-TV)

July 18, 2020 Match 2	Chattanooga FC	3–0	Savannah Clovers FC	Chattanooga, Tennessee
8:00 p.m. EDT	Bement 12'; McGrath 15'; Jackson 51'; Ferraz (yellow card) 74'; Carr (yellow card) 81'; Woodfin (yellow card) 86'; Spielman (yellow card) 90+1'; Lom (red card) 90+3'	Report; Broadcast	Rodriguez (yellow card) 45+1'; Raudales (yellow card) 53'; Pena (red card) 90+3'	Stadium: Finley Stadium; Attendance: 0
Note: Game was played behind closed doors due to the COVID-19 pandemic

July 25, 2020 Match 3	Soda City FC	P–P	Chattanooga FC	Columbia, South Carolina
6:00 p.m. EDT				Stadium: Saluda Shoals Sports Complex
Note: Postponed due to weather

August 1, 2020 Match 3	Soda City FC	0–1	Chattanooga FC	Chattanooga, Tennessee
6:00 p.m. EDT	Jermstad (yellow card) 53'; Haynes (yellow card) 69'	Report; MyCujoo Broadcast	McGrath 5'; Bement 7'; Jackson 64', (yellow card) 70'	Stadium: Finley Stadium; Attendance: 0
Note: Game was played behind closed doors due to the COVID-19 pandemic

=== NISA Fall Season ===
On June 4, NISA announced the initial details for the 2020 Fall Season with the member teams split into conferences, Eastern and Western.

Details for the Fall regular season were announced on July 31, 2020. Chattanooga will take part as a member of the Eastern Conference.

==== Standings ====
Pos	Team	Pld	W	D	L	GF	GA	GD	Pts
1	Chattanooga FC	4	3	0	1	8	3	+5	9
2	Michigan Stars FC	4	2	2	0	6	2	+4	8
3	New York Cosmos	4	1	2	1	5	4	+1	5
4	Detroit City FC	4	1	2	1	3	2	+1	5
5	New Amsterdam FC	4	0	0	4	1	12	−11	0

Source: NISAofficial.com

==== Results summary ====
Overall								Home						Away					
Pld	W	D	L	GF	GA	GD	Pts	W	D	L	GF	GA	GD	W	D	L	GF	GA	GD
4	3	0	1	8	3	+5	9	2	0	0	5	1	+4	1	0	1	3	2	+1

Last updated: September 16, 2020.
Source: Match reports

==== Matches ====
August 8, 2020 Week 1	Michigan Stars FC	2–1	Chattanooga FC	Pontiac, Michigan
7:00 p.m. EDT	Nuel 6', (yellow card) 39'; Aidoo (yellow card) 26'; Juncaj 88', (yellow card) 88'; Aghababazadeh (yellow card) 90+4'	NISA Report; Times Free Press Report; Broadcast	Hernandez (yellow card) 50'; McGrath 59' (pen.); Carr (yellow card) 90+1'	Stadium: Ultimate Soccer Arenas Outdoor Stadium; Attendance: 0
Note: Game was played behind closed doors due to the COVID-19 pandemic

August 15, 2020 Week 2	Detroit City FC	0–2	Chattanooga FC	Hamtramck, Michigan
7:30 p.m. EDT	Capozucchi (yellow card) 58'; Conteh (yellow card) 64'; Venegas (yellow card) 90+2'	Report; Broadcast	Lom 4'; Ferraz 56'	Stadium: Keyworth Stadium; Attendance: 0 Referee: Nicole Green
Note: Game was played behind closed doors due to the COVID-19 pandemic

August 29, 2020 Week 3	Chattanooga FC	P–P	New Amsterdam FC	Chattanooga, Tennessee
7:30 p.m. EDT		Report		Stadium: Finley Stadium
Note: Match was postponed to protest racial injustice after the Shooting of Jacob Blake.

September 12, 2020 Week 4	Chattanooga FC	2–1	New York Cosmos	Chattanooga, Tennessee
8:40 p.m. EDT	Koloko (yellow card) 62'; Lom 76' (pen.); Adams 81'; Russell (yellow card) 90+1'	NISA Report; FotMob Report; Broadcast	Ledula (yellow card) 34'; Alves 37'; Acuña (yellow card) 45+2'	Stadium: Finley Stadium; Attendance: 918; Referee: Carlos Pielago

September 16, 2020 Week 3 (Replay)	Chattanooga FC	3–0	New Amsterdam FC	Chattanooga, Tennessee
7:30 p.m. EDT	Ferraz 10', 59'; Koloko (yellow card) 54'; Hoffstatter 73'; Adams (yellow card) 86'	NISA Report; FotMob Report; Broadcast	Keita (yellow card) 15'; Vicente (yellow card) 67'; Bedoya (yellow card) 90+3'	Stadium: Finley Stadium; Attendance: 517
Note: Match make-up due to the Shooting of Jacob Blake.

=== Fall Playoffs ===
All eight NISA teams qualified for the 2020 Fall tournament, which will be hosted at Keyworth Stadium in Detroit, Michigan, beginning on September 21 ending with the final on October 2.

==== Group stage ====
Pos	Team	Pld	W	D	L	GF	GA	GD	Pts	Qualification
1	Los Angeles Force	3	2	0	1	5	5	0	6	Advance to semifinals
2	Chattanooga FC	3	1	2	0	3	1	+2	5	Advance to semifinals
3	California United Strikers FC	3	1	1	1	5	4	+1	4	
4	New York Cosmos	3	0	1	2	1	4	−3	1	

Updated to match(es) played on September 28, 2020. Source: NISAofficial.com
Rules for classification: 1) Points, 2) Goal differential, 3) Goals scored, 4) Head-to-head record, 5) Coin toss

September 22, 2020 Group stage	Chattanooga FC	2–0	Los Angeles Force	Hamtramck, Michigan
8:00 p.m. EDT	Hoffstatter 45'; Marcano (yellow card) 51'; Lom 63'; Redington (yellow card) 78'; Bement (yellow card) 90+3'	NISA Report; FotMob Report; Broadcast	Torres (red card) 9'; Trejo (penalty missed) 79'	Stadium: Keyworth Stadium; Attendance: 0 Referee: David Eberline
Note: Game was played behind closed doors due to the COVID-19 pandemic

September 25, 2020 Group stage	Chattanooga FC	0–0	New York Cosmos	Hamtramck, Michigan
5:00 p.m. EDT	Hernandez (yellow card) 11'; Carr (yellow card) 33'; Bement (yellow card) 47'; Koloko (yellow card) 64'; Marcano (yellow card) 80'	NISA Report; FotMob Report; Broadcast	Cella (yellow card) 24'; G. Barone (yellow card) 50'	Stadium: Keyworth Stadium; Attendance: 0 Referee: Samuel Pizzimenti
Note: Game was played behind closed doors due to the COVID-19 pandemic

September 28, 2020 Group stage	Chattanooga FC	1–1	California United Strikers FC	Hamtramck, Michigan
5:00 p.m. EDT	Bement 12'; Woodfin (yellow card) 75'; Carr (yellow card) 85'	NISA Report; FotMob Report; Broadcast	Nuño 32'	Stadium: Keyworth Stadium; Attendance: 0 Referee: Conlan Campbell
Note: Game was played behind closed doors due to the COVID-19 pandemic

==== Knockout stage ====
September 30, 2020 Semifinal	Oakland Roots SC	3–2	Chattanooga FC	Hamtramck, Michigan
5:00 p.m. EDT	Rodriguez 6'; Heredia 19'; Pearson (yellow card) 31'; Fondy 48'; Irwin (yellow card) 85'; McInerney (yellow card) 90+4'	NISA Report; FotMob Report; Broadcast	McGrath 46'; Marcano 77'; Russell (yellow card) 90+4'	Stadium: Keyworth Stadium; Attendance: 0 Referee: Samuel Pizzimenti
Note: Game was played behind closed doors due to the COVID-19 pandemic

=== NISA Spring Season ===
==== NISA Legends Cup ====
NISA announced initial season plans in early February 2021, including starting the season with a tournament in Chattanooga, Tennessee with a standard regular season to follow. The tournament, now called the NISA Legends Cup, was officially announced on March 10 and is scheduled to run between April 13 and 25. All nine NISA members teams take part in the Spring will be divided into three team groups. The highest placing group winner would automatically qualify for the tournament final, while the second and third highest group winners would play one-another in a semifinal to determine a second finalist.

Chattanooga were drawn into Group 3 alongside Los Angeles Force and New Amsterdam FC.

===== Standings =====
Pos	Team	Pld	W	D	L	GF	GA	GD	Pts	Qualification
1	Chattanooga FC	2	2	0	0	7	1	+6	6	Advance to Legends Cup final
2	Detroit City FC	2	1	1	0	2	0	+2	4	Advance to Legends Cup semifinal
3	San Diego 1904 FC	2	1	1	0	3	2	+1	4	Advance to Legends Cup semifinal
4	Los Angeles Force	2	1	0	1	4	6	−2	3	
5	Michigan Stars FC	2	0	2	0	2	2	0	2	
6	California United Strikers FC	2	0	2	0	1	1	0	2	
7	Maryland Bobcats FC	2	0	1	1	2	3	−1	1	
8	Stumptown AC	2	0	1	1	1	3	−2	1	
9	New Amsterdam FC	2	0	0	2	2	6	−4	0	

Source: nisasoccer.com
Rules for classification: 1) points; 2) goal differential; 3) goals scored; 4) head to head; 5) goals allowed; 6) coin toss

===== Group 3 results =====
Home \ Away	CHA	LAF	NAM
Chattanooga FC	—	4–1	3–0
Los Angeles Force		—	3–2
New Amsterdam FC			—

Source: nisasoccer.com
Legend: Blue = home team win; Yellow = draw; Red = away team win.

===== Matches =====
April 13, 2021 Group 3 Round One	Chattanooga FC	4–1	Los Angeles Force	Chattanooga, Tennessee
8:00 p.m. EDT	Hernandez 22'; Woodfin 29'; Naglestad 40'; Hoffstatter 64'; D’Amico (yellow card) 85'	NISA Report; CFC Report	Hoffman 6'; Reis de Oliveira (yellow card) 40' (yellow-red card) 90'; Gomez (yellow card) 84'	Stadium: Finley Stadium; Attendance: 1,257

April 16, 2021 Group 3 Round Two	New Amsterdam FC	0–3	Chattanooga FC	Chattanooga, Tennessee
8:00 p.m. EDT	Malango (yellow card) 70'; Kone (yellow card) 80'; Sylvester (yellow card) 89'	NISA Report; CFC Report	McGrath 29', 75'; Bement (yellow card) 77'; Jones 90+6'	Stadium: Finley Stadium; Attendance: 2,249

April 25, 2021 Legends Cup Final	Chattanooga FC	0–3	Detroit City FC	Chattanooga, Tennessee
8:00 p.m. EDT	McGrath (yellow card) 57'; CFC Bench (yellow card) 87'	NISA Report; DCFC Report	Lewis 11'; Todd 35' (pen.); Venegas 90+5'	Stadium: Finley Stadium; Referee: Jeremy Scheer

==== Regular season ====
The Spring Season schedule was announced on March 18 with each association member playing eight games, four home and four away, in a single round-robin format.

===== Standings =====
Pos	Team	Pld	W	D	L	GF	GA	GD	Pts	Qualification
1	Detroit City FC (Y, X)	8	6	2	0	14	3	+11	20	Advance to season final
2	Los Angeles Force	8	6	0	2	11	6	+5	18	Advance to spring final (Note: If either 2020 Fall Champion Detroit or 2021 Legends Cup runner-up Chattanooga finish the spring season in first place, or both teams finish in the top two, the spot in the spring final will go to the next best team.)
3	Stumptown AC	8	4	3	1	8	4	+4	15	
4	California United Strikers FC	8	4	1	3	12	10	+2	13	
5	Maryland Bobcats FC	8	3	2	3	9	8	+1	11	
6	Chattanooga FC (Z)	8	2	2	4	6	8	−2	8	Advance to spring final
7	San Diego 1904 FC	8	2	1	5	8	17	−9	7	
8	Michigan Stars FC	8	1	2	5	5	12	−7	5	
9	New Amsterdam FC	8	1	1	6	5	10	−5	4	

Source: nisasoccer.com
Rules for classification: 1) points; 2) goal differential; 3) goals scored; 4) head to head; 5) goals allowed; 6) coin toss
(X) Spring Legends Cup champion; (Y) Fall Champion, qualifies for season final; (Z) Spring Legends Cup runner-up, qualifies for spring final

===== Results summary =====
Overall								Home						Away					
Pld	W	D	L	GF	GA	GD	Pts	W	D	L	GF	GA	GD	W	D	L	GF	GA	GD
8	2	2	4	6	8	−2	8	2	1	1	4	2	+2	0	1	3	2	6	−4

Last updated: June 26, 2021.
Source: Match reports

===== Matches =====
May 2, 2021 Week 1	California United Strikers FC	1–0	Chattanooga FC	Irvine, California
4:00 p.m. PDT	Araneda 23'	NISA Report; Cal Report; Chattanooga Report	McGrath (yellow card) 79'	Stadium: Championship Stadium; Referee: Samantha Martinez

May 9, 2021 Week 2	Chattanooga FC	2–1	Michigan Stars FC	Chattanooga, Tennessee
7:30 p.m. EDT	Hoffstatter (yellow card) 35'; Russell (yellow card) 76'; Jones 80'; Naglestad 90+7' (pen.); Bement (red card) 90+7'	NISA Report; Chattanooga Report; Broadcast	Satrústegui 64'; Nuel (yellow card) 90+3'; Amoo-Mensah (yellow card) 90+5'; Aidoo (yellow card) 90+5'; Tazifor (Asst. coach) (red card) 90+7'	Stadium: Finley Stadium; Attendance: 2,329; Referee: Rashawn Clark
Note: An altercation following the match resulted in the suspension of three player and one Michigan Stars' assistant coach

May 29, 2021 Week 3	Chattanooga FC	0–0	Maryland Bobcats FC	Chattanooga, Tennessee
7:30 p.m. EDT		NISA Report; CFC Report; Broadcast	Fane (yellow card) 35'; Possian (yellow card) 65'	Stadium: Finley Stadium; Attendance: 3,231; Referee: Carlos Pielago
Note: Samuel Kahsai incorrectly listed as receiving a yellow and broadcast clarified it was Yaya Fane, report missing Ian McGrath entering for Brett Jones in 16th minute (lists Jones leaving)

June 5, 2021 Week 4	Chattanooga FC	2–0	New Amsterdam FC	Chattanooga, Tennessee
7:30 p.m. EDT	McGrath 44', (yellow card) 52'; Kasak (yellow card) 45+4'; Oliveira (yellow card) 69'; Hoffstatter 73'; Marcano (yellow card) 90+2'; Coleman (yellow card) 90+3'	Report; Broadcast	Diosa (red card) 40'; Kafari (yellow card) 56'; Vicente (yellow card) 63'	Stadium: Finley Stadium; Attendance: 2,718; Referee: Jervis Atagana
Note: Yellow card in 90+2' minute incorrectly attributed to Kyle Carr on report

June 9, 2021 Week 5	Los Angeles Force	2–0	Chattanooga FC	Norco, California
7:30 p.m. PDT	Chaney 68', 76'	First Half Stream; Second Half Stream	Dixon (yellow card) 66' (yellow-red card) 71'; Russell (yellow card) 89'	Stadium: Silverlakes Sports Complex
Note: Match originally scheduled to be played at Rio Hondo Stadium in Whittier, California; match report not complete and information (including stats) taken from team Twitter and fan stream

June 12, 2021 Week 6	San Diego 1904 FC	1–1	Chattanooga FC	Chula Vista, California
5:00 p.m. PDT	Ramos (yellow card) 37'; Gourdie 45+2'; Keszweski (yellow card) 85'	Report; Broadcast	Coleman (yellow card) 24'; McKinley (yellow card) 46'; McGrath 89'	Stadium: Chula Vista Elite Athlete Training Center; Referee: Samantha Martinez

June 19, 2021 Week 7	Chattanooga FC	0–1	Stumptown AC	Chattanooga, Tennessee
7:30 p.m. EDT	Robertson (yellow card) 48'; Russell (yellow card) 50'; Spielman (yellow card) 89'	Report; Broadcast	Garcia Sosa 40'; Greenberg (yellow card) 52'	Stadium: Finley Stadium; Attendance: 2,485; Referee: Nicole Green

June 26, 2021 Week 8	Detroit City FC	2–1	Chattanooga FC	Hamtramck, Michigan
7:30 p.m. EDT	Botello Faz 2'; Filerman 19'; Espinal (yellow card) 72'; Rodríguez (yellow card) 74'	NISA Report; DCFC Report; Broadcast	Coleman (yellow card) 16'; Oliveira 79'	Stadium: Keyworth Stadium; Attendance: 4,741; Referee: Lorenzo Hernandez

===== Spring Playoffs =====
June 30, 2021 Semifinal	Chattanooga FC	2–3	Los Angeles Force	Hamtramck, Michigan
7:30 p.m. EDT	Naglestad 31', 47' (pen.); Robertson (yellow card) 82'; Russell (red card) 88'; McGrath (yellow card) 90+4'	Report; Broadcast	McLaughlin (yellow card) 47'; Chaney 57', (yellow card) 90+2'; Ocegueda 70'; Barrera (yellow card) 78'; Gordillo 83'; Villon (red card) 87'	Stadium: Keyworth Stadium; Attendance: >100; Referee: Jeremy Scheer
Note: Report missing yellow cards from Barrera and Tate but they are shown on broadcast, Russell's red card is misattributed to Richard Dixon, LA's starting XI lists Kashani when it was actually Villatoro. Following the match, both red cards issued to Russell and Villon were downgraded to yellow cards.

=== U.S. Open Cup ===
As a team playing in a recognized professional league, Chattanooga would normally be automatically qualified for the U.S. Open Cup. However, with the 2021 edition shorted due to the COVID-19 pandemic, NISA has only been allotted 1 to 2 teams spots. On March 29, U.S. Soccer announced 2020 Fall Champion Detroit City FC as NISA's representative in the tournament.

== Squad statistics ==
As of Match played June 30, 2021

=== Appearances and goals ===
No.	Pos	Nat	Player	Total		Fall Season		Fall Playoffs		Legends Cup		Spring Season		Spring Playoffs	
No.	Pos	Nat	Player	Apps	Goals	Apps	Goals	Apps	Goals	Apps	Goals	Apps	Goals	Apps	Goals
Goalkeepers
1	GK	(United States) USA	Alec Redington	13	0	3+0	0	4+0	0	0+0	0	5+0	0	1+0	0
23	GK	(United States) USA	Nick Nelson	-1	0	-	-	-	-	-	-	1+0	0	0+0	0
51	GK	(United States) USA	Michael Barrueta	0	0	-	-	-	-	0+0	0	0+0	0	0+0	0
77	GK	(United States) USA	Phillip D’Amico	5	0	-	-	-	-	3+0	0	2+0	0	0+0	0
Defenders
3	DF	(United States) USA	Shaun Russell	17	0	3+0	0	4+0	0	2+0	0	6+1	0	1+0	0
4	DF	(Jamaica) JAM	Richard Dixon	10	0	4+0	0	1+0	0	0+0	0	4+0	0	1+0	0
15	DF	(United States) USA	Angel Hurtado	0	0	-	-	-	-	0+0	0	0+0	0	0+0	0
21	DF	(United States) USA	James Kasak	9	0	-	-	-	-	2+0	0	6+0	0	1+0	0
66	DF	(United States) USA	Kaio DaSilva	6	0	-	-	-	-	3+0	0	1+2	0	0+0	0
Midfielders
5	MF	(United States) USA	Kyle Carr	11	0	1+2	0	3+1	0	0+0	0	3+1	0	0+0	0
6	MF	(United States) USA	Nick Spielman	20	0	4+0	0	4+0	0	3+0	0	7+1	0	1+0	0
7	MF	(United States) USA	Tate Robertson	12	0	-	-	-	-	3+0	0	8+0	0	1+0	0
8	MF	(United States) USA	Ian McGrath	16	6	2+0	1	3+1	1	3+0	2	5+1	2	1+0	0
10	MF	(Spain) ESP	Juan Hernandez	16	1	4+0	0	3+1	0	3+0	1	4+0	0	1+0	0
11	MF	(United States) USA	Christopher Marshall	12	0	1+4	0	0+2	0	0+1	0	1+3	0	0+0	0
13	MF	(United States) USA	Cutler Coleman	12	0	-	-	0+0	0	1+2	0	4+4	0	0+1	0
16	MF	(United States) USA	Ricardo Bahena	0	0	-	-	-	-	0+0	0	0+0	0	0+0	0
22	MF	(United States) USA	Cameron Woodfin	17	1	2+0	0	3+0	0	2+1	1	8+0	0	1+0	0
31	MF	(United States) USA	Alec McKinley	9	0	1+1	0	0+0	0	0+0	0	4+2	0	0+1	0
Forwards
2	FW	(United States) USA	Ryan Marcano	17	1	3+0	0	1+3	1	0+2	0	2+6	0	0+0	0
9	FW	(Norway) NOR	Markus Naglestad	7	4	-	-	-	-	2+0	1	2+2	1	1+0	2
14	FW	(United States) USA	Brian Bement	16	1	0+2	0	2+2	1	3+0	0	4+2	0	0+1	0
17	FW	(Brazil) BRA	Felipe Oliveira	4	1	-	-	-	-	0+0	0	3+1	1	0+0	0
20	FW	(United States) USA	Brett Jones	6	1	-	-	-	-	0+3	1	1+2	0	0+0	0
24	FW	(United States) USA	Sean Hoffstatter	16	4	2+0	1	3+0	1	3+0	1	7+0	1	1+0	0
Left during season
1	GK	(United States) USA	Matt Mozynski	2	0	1+0	0	0+1	0	-	-	-	-	-	-
3	DF	(Liberia) LBR	Wilfred Williams	3	0	0+1	0	2+0	0	-	-	-	-	-	-
4	FW	(Brazil) BRA	Zeca Ferraz	7	3	4+0	3	3+0	0	-	-	-	-	-	-
7	FW	(United States) USA	Clayton Adams	4	1	0+2	1	1+1	0	-	-	-	-	-	-
9	FW	(United States) USA	Santiago Agudelo	0	0	0+0	0	0+0	0	-	-	-	-	-	-
11	FW	(United States) USA	Kaleb Jackson	1	0	1+0	0	0+0	0	-	-	-	-	-	-
17	MF	(Jamaica) JAM	Jowayne Laidley	4	0	1+2	0	1+0	0	-	-	-	-	-	-
24	DF	(Netherlands) NED	Soren Yuhaschek	0	0	0+0	0	0+0	0	-	-	-	-	-	-
42	MF	(Cameroon) CMR	David Koloko	6	0	3+0	0	3+0	0	-	-	-	-	-	-
64	DF	(New Zealand) NZL	Erik Panzer	3	0	1+0	0	0+2	0	-	-	-	-	-	-
88	FW	(Guatemala) GUA	Darwin Lom	7	3	3+0	2	3+1	1	-	-	-	-	-	-

=== Goal scorers ===
Place	Position	Nation	Number	Name	Fall Season	Fall Playoffs	Legends Cup	Spring Season	Spring Playoffs	Total
1	MF	(United States)	8	Ian McGrath	1	1	2	2	0	6
2	FW	(Norway)	9	Markus Naglestad	-	-	1	1	2	4
2	FW	(United States)	24	Sean Hoffstatter	1	1	1	1	0	4
3	FW	(Brazil)	4	Zeca Ferraz	3	0	-	-	-	3
3	FW	(Guatemala)	88	Darwin Lom	2	1	-	-	-	3
4	FW	(United States)	20	Brett Jones	-	-	1	1	0	2
5	FW	(United States)	2	Ryan Marcano	0	1	0	0	0	1
5	FW	(United States)	7	Clayton Adams	1	0	-	-	-	1
5	FW	(Spain)	10	Juan Hernandez	0	0	1	0	0	1
5	FW	(United States)	14	Brian Bement	0	1	0	0	0	1
5	FW	(Brazil)	17	Felipe Oliveira	-	-	-	1	0	1
5	MF	(United States)	22	Cameron Woodfin	0	0	1	0	0	1

=== Disciplinary record ===
Number	Nation	Position	Name	Fall Season		Fall Playoffs		Legends Cup		Spring Season		Spring Playoffs		Total	
Number	Nation	Position	Name	Booked	Sent off (straight red)	Booked	Sent off (straight red)	Booked	Sent off (straight red)	Booked	Sent off (straight red)	Booked	Sent off (straight red)	Booked	Sent off (straight red)
1	(United States)	GK	Alec Redington	0	0	1	0	0	0	0	0	0	0	1	0
2	(United States)	FW	Ryan Marcano	0	0	2	0	0	0	1	0	0	0	3	0
3	(United States)	DF	Shaun Russell	1	0	1	0	0	0	3	0	0	1	5	1
4	(Jamaica)	DF	Richard Dixon	0	0	0	0	0	0	2	1	0	0	2	1
5	(United States)	MF	Kyle Carr	1	0	2	0	0	0	0	0	0	0	3	0
6	(United States)	MF	Nick Spielman	0	0	0	0	0	0	1	0	0	0	1	0
7	(United States)	FW	Clayton Adams	1	0	0	0	-	-	-	-	-	-	1	0
7	(United States)	MF	Tate Robertson	-	-	-	-	0	0	1	0	1	0	2	0
8	(United States)	MF	Ian McGrath	0	0	0	0	1	0	2	0	1	0	4	0
10	(Spain)	MF	Juan Hernandez	1	0	1	0	0	0	0	0	0	0	2	0
13	(United States)	MF	Cutler Coleman	0	0	0	0	0	0	3	0	0	0	3	0
14	(United States)	FW	Brian Bement	0	0	2	0	1	0	0	1	0	0	3	1
17	(Brazil)	FW	Felipe Oliveira	-	-	-	-	0	0	1	0	0	0	1	0
21	(United States)	DF	James Kasak	-	-	-	-	0	0	1	0	0	0	1	0
22	(United States)	MF	Cameron Woodfin	0	0	1	0	0	0	0	0	0	0	1	0
24	(United States)	FW	Sean Hoffstatter	0	0	0	0	0	0	1	0	0	0	1	0
31	(United States)	MF	Alec McKinley	0	0	0	0	0	0	1	0	0	0	1	0
42	(Cameroon)	MF	David Koloko	2	0	1	0	-	-	-	-	-	-	3	0
77	(United States)	GK	Phillip D’Amico	-	-	-	-	1	0	0	0	0	0	1	0
