= 2019–20 Chattanooga FC season =

American soccer team season

Chattanooga FC
2019–20 NISA season
- Managing director: Jeremy Alumbaugh
- Head coach: Peter Fuller
- Stadium: Finley Stadium; Chattanooga, Tennessee
- NISA: Fall: N/A; Spring: 6th
- Playoffs: Fall: N/A; Spring: N/A
- U.S. Open Cup: Cancelled
- Top goalscorer: League: Ian McGrath (1); All: Ian McGrath (1)
Home colours	Away colours

The 2019–20 Chattanooga FC season was the club's first season playing in the National Independent Soccer Association, a newly established third division soccer league in the United States, and first professional season since being established in 2009.

== Overview ==
Chattanooga FC was admitted into the National Independent Soccer Association on August 15, 2019, and latter fully accepted by the U.S. Soccer Federation on December 11, 2019, and will start competing in the 2020 Spring season. The team had spent its entire eleven-year history in the National Premier Soccer League, a semi-pro league generally considered the fourth tier of U.S. Soccer, and reached its National Final on four separate occasions (2010, 2012, 2014, & 2015) which is a shared record for the most finals appearance with Sonoma County Sol.

Prior to joining NISA, Chattanooga hosted two international friendlies. On May 25, the team hosted La Liga side Real Betis in the latter's first game ever in the United States. The home side scored twice in the final ten minutes in the 4–3 loss in front of 6,115 fans at Finley Stadium. The next month, the team took part in 30-time Guatemalan league champion C.S.D. Municipal during its pre-season tour of the U.S., drawing 1–1 at Ridgeland High School in Rossville, Georgia.

On April 27, 2020, following a stoppage of play and subsequent extension due to the COVID-19 pandemic, NISA announced the cancellation of the 2020 Spring season.

== Players and staff ==
=== Roster ===
As of March 16, 2020

No.	Position	Nation	Player
1	GK	USA	Phil D'Amico
2	DF	USA	Raymond Lee
3	DF	HAI	Jerry Saint-Vil
4	DF	ESP	Juan Sanchez
5	DF	JAM	Richard Dixon
6	MF	USA	Nick Spielman
7	FW	USA	Clayton Adams
8	FW	BRA	Joao Costa
9	FW	USA	Santiago Agudelo
10	MF	ESP	Juan Hernandez
11	FW	USA	Kaleb Jackson
12	MF	USA	Kyle Carr
14	FW	USA	Brian Bement
15	DF	USA	Sean Reynolds
17	FW	JAM	Jowayne Laidley
18	FW	USA	Sean Hoffstatter
19	FW	USA	Ryan Marcano
20	MF	USA	Christopher Marshall
21	DF	CAN	Jordan Dunstan
22	MF	USA	Cameron Woodfin
23	MF	USA	Ian McGrath
24	DF	NED	Soren Yuhaschek
28	GK	USA	Alec Redington
64	DF	NZL	Erik Panzer
—	DF	USA	Alec McKinley

=== Technical staff ===
Technical staff
Technical Director	(United States) Bill Elliott
Head Coach	(United States) Peter Fuller
Director of Soccer Operations	(United States) Jordan Mattheiss

== Transfers ==
=== In ===
#	Pos.	Player	Signed from	Details	Date	Source
5	DF	(Jamaica) Richard Dixon	(United States) Chattanooga Red Wolves SC	Free transfer	January 6, 2020	
1	GK	(United States) Phillip D'Amico	(United States) Chattanooga FC (NPSL)	Free transfer	January 24, 2020	
22	MF	(United States) Cameron Woodfin	(United States) Chattanooga FC (NPSL)	Free transfer	January 28, 2020	
10	MF	(Spain) Juan Hernandez	(United States) Chattanooga FC (NPSL)	Free transfer	January 28, 2020	
8	FW	(Brazil) Joao Costa	(United States) Chattanooga FC (NPSL)	Free transfer	January 29, 2020	
21	DF	(Canada) Jordan Dunstan	(United States) Chattanooga FC (NPSL)	Free transfer	January 29, 2020	
28	GK	(United States) Alec Redington	(United States) St. Louis Community College	Free transfer	January 30, 2020	
17	FW	(Jamaica) Jowayne Laidley	(United States) Chattanooga FC (NPSL)	Free transfer	January 30, 2020	
18	FW	(United States) Sean Hoffstatter	(United States) University of West Florida	Free transfer	January 31, 2020	
14	FW	(United States) Brian Bement	(United States) Forward Madison FC	Free transfer	February 3, 2020	
20	MF	(United States) Christopher Marshall	(United States) Oglethorpe University	Free transfer	February 3, 2020	
4	DF	(Spain) Juan Sanchez	(United States) Chattanooga FC (NPSL)	Free transfer	February 5, 2020	
11	FW	(United States) Kaleb Jackson	(United States) South Georgia Tormenta FC	Free transfer	February 6, 2020	
24	DF	(Netherlands) Soren Yuhaschek	(United States) Chattanooga FC (NPSL)	Free transfer	February 7, 2020	
7	FW	(United States) Clayton Adams	(United States) Austin Bold FC	Free transfer	February 10, 2020	
9	FW	(United States) Santiago Agudelo	(United States) Fort Hays State University	Free transfer	February 11, 2020	
23	MF	(United States) Ian McGrath	(United States) OKC Energy FC	Free transfer	February 21, 2020	
3	DF	(Haiti) Jerry Saint-Vil	(United States) South Georgia Tormenta	Free transfer	February 25, 2020	
2	DF	(United States) Raymond Lee	(United States) Hartford Athletic	Free transfer	February 26, 2020	
15	DF	(United States) Sean Reynolds	(United States) Saint Louis FC	Free transfer	February 27, 2020	
12	MF	(United States) Kyle Carr	(United States) Lansing Ignite FC	Free transfer	February 27, 2020	
	MF	(United States) Alec McKinley	(United States) Mobile Rams	Free transfer	February 28, 2020	
19	FW	(United States) Ryan Marcano	(United States) Oglethorpe Stormy Petrels	Free transfer	February 28, 2020	
6	MF	(United States) Nick Spielman	(United States) East Tennessee State Buccaneers	Free transfer	February 28, 2020	
64	DF	(New Zealand) Erik Panzer	(New Zealand) Southern United FC	Free transfer	March 16, 2020	

== Friendlies ==
March 23, 2019 Friendly	Chattanooga FC	0-2	(Guatemala) Comunicaciones F.C.	Chattanooga, Tennessee
6:00 p.m.		Report	Ortiz 66'; Garcia 84'	Stadium: Finley Stadium; Attendance: 7,235
Note: Chattanooga was still competing within the National Premier Soccer League at this point

May 4, 2019 Friendly	Chattanooga FC	2–1	Nebraska Bugeaters FC	Chattanooga, Tennessee
7:30 p.m.	Yuhaschek (yellow card) 42'; Cole 50'; Oliveira 66'	Chattanooga FC Highlights; Times Free Press Report	Bennett (yellow card) 21'; Segar 78'	Stadium: Finley Stadium
Note: Chattanooga was still competing within the National Premier Soccer League at this point

May 25, 2019 Friendly	Chattanooga FC	3–4	(Spain) Real Betis	Chattanooga, Tennessee
6:00 p.m.	Costa 12'; Webb 84'; Ferraz 90+2'	Chattanooga FC Highlights; Times Free Press Report	León 45+1'; Jesé 68', 72'; Rodríguez 80'	Stadium: Finley Stadium; Attendance: 6,115
Note: Chattanooga was still competing within the National Premier Soccer League at this point

June 30, 2019 Friendly	Chattanooga FC	1–1	(Guatemala) C.S.D. Municipal	Rossville, Georgia
6:00 p.m.	Gonzalez 22'	Chattanooga FC Highlights; Times Free Press Report	Gallardo 40'	Stadium: Ridgeland High School
Note: Chattanooga was still competing within the National Premier Soccer League at this point

October 12, 2019 Friendly	Stumptown Athletic	2–2	Chattanooga FC	Charlotte, North Carolina
7:04 p.m.	Grant 59' (pen.); West 64'	Chattanooga FC Highlights; Times Free Press Report	Oliveira 26', 56'	Stadium: CSA OrthoCarolina Sportsplex; Attendance: 885

October 19, 2019 Friendly	Chattanooga FC	0–0	Stumptown Athletic	Chattanooga, Tennessee
6:00 p.m.		Chattanooga FC Highlights; Times Free Press Report		Stadium: Finley Stadium; Attendance: 819

February 14, 2020 Scrimmage	Chattanooga FC	0–1	Memphis 901 FC	Orange Beach, Alabama
7:00 p.m.		Report	da Silva 67' (pen.)	Stadium: Orange Beach Sportsplex

== Competitions ==
=== NISA Fall season ===
Chattanooga did not take part in the 2019 NISA Fall season in an official capacity. On August 15, the NISA Board of Governors announced the team, along with Detroit City FC and Oakland Roots SC, had been accepted into the league but would not begin full league play until Spring 2020. During the fall, Chattanooga did play a friendly home-and-away series against NISA side Stumptown Athletic with both games ending in a draw.

=== NISA Spring season ===
Details for the 2020 NISA Spring season were announced January 27, 2020.

==== Standings ====
Pos	Team	Pld	W	D	L	GF	GA	GD	Pts	Qualification
1	Oakland Roots SC	2	1	1	0	3	2	+1	4	Playoffs
2	California United Strikers FC (Q)	2	1	1	0	1	0	+1	4	Playoffs
3	Detroit City FC	1	1	0	0	2	0	+2	3	Playoffs
4	Stumptown Athletic	2	0	2	0	3	3	0	2	Playoffs
5	San Diego 1904 FC	2	0	2	0	2	2	0	2	
6	Chattanooga FC	1	0	1	0	1	1	0	1	
7	Los Angeles Force	2	0	1	1	1	3	−2	1	
8	Michigan Stars FC	2	0	0	2	1	3	−2	0	

Updated to match(es) played on March 8, 2020. Source: NISAofficial.com
(Q) Qualified for the phase indicated

==== Results summary ====
Overall								Home						Away					
Pld	W	D	L	GF	GA	GD	Pts	W	D	L	GF	GA	GD	W	D	L	GF	GA	GD
1	0	1	0	1	1	0	1	0	0	0	0	0	0	0	1	0	1	1	0

Last updated: 29 February 2020.
Source: Match reports

==== Matches ====
February 29, 2020 1	Oakland Roots SC	1–1	Chattanooga FC	Oakland, California
5:10 p.m.	Hines II (red card) 41'; McInerney 90+3', (yellow card) 90+3'	Report	McGrath 33', (yellow card) 42'; Lee (yellow card) 51'	Stadium: Laney College; Attendance: 5,603

March 14, 2020 2	Chattanooga FC	P–P	Michigan Stars FC	Chattanooga, Tennessee
3:00 p.m.				Stadium: Finley Stadium
Note: On March 12, NISA announced that it would be suspending its season 30 days due to the COVID-19 pandemic

March 21, 2020 3	Chattanooga FC	P–P	California United Strikers FC	Chattanooga, Tennessee
3:00 p.m.				Stadium: Finley Stadium
Note: On March 12, NISA announced that it would be suspending its season 30 days due to the COVID-19 pandemic

March 28, 2020 4	Stumptown Athletic	P–P	Chattanooga FC	Matthews, North Carolina
7:04 p.m.				Stadium: Sportsplex at Matthews
Note: On March 12, NISA announced that it would be suspending its season 30 days due to the COVID-19 pandemic

April 4, 2020 5	Chattanooga FC	P–P	Los Angeles Force	Chattanooga, Tennessee
7:30 p.m.				Stadium: Finley Stadium
Note: On March 12, NISA announced that it would be suspending its season 30 days due to the COVID-19 pandemic

April 11, 2020 6	Detroit City FC	P–P	Chattanooga FC	Hamtramck, Michigan
3:00 p.m.				Stadium: Keyworth Stadium
Note: On March 30, NISA announced that it would be extending its suspension of play to May 10 in accordance with CDC guidelines for COVID-19

April 18, 2020 7	Chattanooga FC	P–P	Stumptown Athletic	Chattanooga, Tennessee
7:30 p.m.				Stadium: Finley Stadium
Note: On March 30, NISA announced that it would be extending its suspension of play to May 10 in accordance with CDC guidelines for COVID-19

April 24, 2020 8	Los Angeles Force	P–P	Chattanooga FC	Los Angeles, California
7:30 p.m.				Stadium: Jesse Owens Stadium
Note: On March 30, NISA announced that it would be extending its suspension of play to May 10 in accordance with CDC guidelines for COVID-19

May 2, 2020 9	Chattanooga FC	P–P	Detroit City FC	Chattanooga, Tennessee
7:30 p.m.				Stadium: Finley Stadium
Note: On March 30, NISA announced that it would be extending its suspension of play to May 10 in accordance with CDC guidelines for COVID-19

May 10, 2020 10	California United Strikers FC	P–P	Chattanooga FC	Irvine, California
4:00 p.m.				Stadium: Championship Soccer Stadium
Note: On March 30, NISA announced that it would be extending its suspension of play to May 10 in accordance with CDC guidelines for COVID-19

May 16, 2020 11	Chattanooga FC	v	Oakland Roots SC	Chattanooga, Tennessee
7:30 p.m.				Stadium: Finley Stadium
Note: On April 28, NISA announced the cancellation of the 2020 Spring season due to COVID-19

May 23, 2020 12	Chattanooga FC	v	San Diego 1904 FC	Chattanooga, Tennessee
7:30 p.m.				Stadium: Finley Stadium
Note: On April 28, NISA announced the cancellation of the 2020 Spring season due to COVID-19

May 29, 2020 13	Michigan Stars FC	v	Chattanooga FC	Pontiac, Michigan
7:00 p.m.				Stadium: Ultimate Soccer Arenas Outdoor Stadium
Note: On April 28, NISA announced the cancellation of the 2020 Spring season due to COVID-19

June 6, 2020 14	San Diego 1904 FC	v	Chattanooga FC	San Diego, California
7:04 p.m				Stadium: Lincoln High School
Note: On April 28, NISA announced the cancellation of the 2020 Spring season due to COVID-19

=== U.S. Open Cup ===
For the first time in its history, Chattanooga will automatically qualify for the U.S. Open Cup tournament. The team will enter the 2020 tournament with the rest of the National Independent Soccer Association teams in the Second Round. It was announced on January 29 that their first opponent would be USL Championship side Memphis 901 FC.

April 8 Second Round	Memphis 901 FC (USLC) (Tennessee)	P–P	(Tennessee) Chattanooga FC (NISA)	Memphis, Tennessee
7:00 pm EDT				Stadium: Mike Rose Soccer Complex
Note: On March 13, U.S. Soccer’s Open Cup Committee announced the tournament would be temporarily suspended due to the COVID-19 pandemic

== Squad statistics ==
As of Match played 29 February 2020

=== Appearances and goals ===
No.	Pos	Nat	Player	Total		Spring Season		U.S. Open Cup	
No.	Pos	Nat	Player	Apps	Goals	Apps	Goals	Apps	Goals
Goalkeepers
1	GK	(United States) USA	Phil D'Amico	1	0	1	0	-	-
Defenders
2	DF	(United States) USA	Raymond Lee	1	0	1	0	-	-
3	DF	(Haiti) HAI	Jerry Saint-Vil	1	0	1	0	-	-
15	DF	(United States) USA	Sean Reynolds	1	0	1	0	-	-
24	DF	(Netherlands) NED	Soren Yuhaschek	1	0	1	0	-	-
Midfielders
6	MF	(United States) USA	Nick Spielman	1	0	1	0	-	-
12	MF	(United States) USA	Kyle Carr	1	0	1	0	-	-
19	MF	(United States) USA	Ryan Marcano	1	0	1	0	-	-
20	MF	(United States) USA	Christopher Marshall	1	0	1	0	-	-
23	MF	(United States) USA	Ian McGrath	1	1	1	1	-	-
Forwards
9	FW	(United States) USA	Santiago Agudelo	1	0	1	0	-	-
11	FW	(United States) USA	Kaleb Jackson	1	0	1	0	-	-
14	FW	(United States) USA	Brian Bement	1	0	1	0	-	-
18	FW	(United States) USA	Sean Hoffstatter	1	0	1	0	-	-

=== Goal scorers ===
Place	Position	Nation	Number	Name	Spring Season	U.S. Open Cup	Total
1	FW	(United States)	23	Ian McGrath	1	-	1

=== Disciplinary record ===
Number	Nation	Position	Name	Spring Season		U.S. Open Cup		Total	
Number	Nation	Position	Name	Booked	Sent off (straight red)	Booked	Sent off (straight red)	Booked	Sent off (straight red)
2	(United States)	DF	Raymond Lee	1	0	-	-	1	0
23	(United States)	MF	Ian McGrath	1	0	-	-	1	0

== See also ==
- 2019–20 NISA season
