= Richard Dixon =

Richard or Ricky Dixon may refer to:

== Law and politics ==
- Richard Dixon (communist) (1905–1976), Australian communist leader
- Richard N. Dixon (1938–2012), American politician in Maryland
- Richard Clay Dixon (born 1941), American politician in Ohio

== Sports ==
- Richard Dixon (sailor) (1865–1949), British sailor who competed in the 1908 Summer Olympics
- Ricky Dixon (born 1969), Nicaraguan judoka
- Richard Dixon (footballer, born 1990), Jamaican-American footballer
- Richard Dixon (footballer, born 1992), Panamanian footballer
- Richie Dixon (born c. 1947), Scotland international rugby union player and coach
- Rickey Dixon (1966–2020), American football player

== Others ==
- Richard Dixon (bishop) (fl. 1570s), bishop of Cork and Cloyne
- Richard Watson Dixon (1833–1900), English poet and divine
- Richard Dixon (chemist) (1930–2021), British chemist
- Richard Frederick Dixon (born 1940), American criminal hijacker and murderer
- Richard Dixon (translator) (born 1956), British translator
- Richard Dixon (USCG) (fl. 1980), American Coast Guard officer
- Richard Dixon (biologist), American biologist; professor at the University of North Texas
- Ricky D. Dixon, American correctional officer and cabinet secretary of Florida

== Other uses ==
- USCGC Richard Dixon, the thirteenth Sentinel-class cutter

== See also ==
- Richard Dickson (disambiguation)
