= Kaleb Jackson =

American soccer player (born 1996)

Personal information
- Full name: Kaleb Jackson
- Date of birth: June 11, 1996 (age 30)
- Place of birth: St. Louis, Missouri, United States
- Height: 1.80 m (5 ft 11 in)
- Position: Forward

Team information
- Current team: AC Syracuse Pulse
- Number: 7

College career
Years	Team	Apps	(Gls)
2014–2017	Rockhurst Hawks	82	(36)

Senior career*
Years	Team	Apps	(Gls)
2017	AFC Ann Arbor	9	(3)
2018	Club Atletico Saint Louis	2	(0)
2019	South Georgia Tormenta	8	(0)
2020	Chattanooga FC	2	(0)
2022–	AC Syracuse Pulse	2	(1)
- * Club domestic league appearances and goals as of 14 April 2022

Kaleb Jackson (born June 11, 1996) is an American soccer player who plays as a forward for AC Syracuse Pulse.

== Career ==
=== College and amateur ===
Jackson played four years of college soccer at Rockhurst University between 2014 and 2017. While at college, Jackson also appeared for National Premier Soccer League side AFC Ann Arbor during their 2017 season, where he scored three goals and tallied two assists. In 2018, Jackson made two appearances with Saint Louis Club Atletico during the team's inaugural season in the NPSL.

=== Professional ===
On March 19, 2019, Jackson signed with USL League One side South Georgia Tormenta.

In February 2020, Jackson was signed by Chattanooga FC of the National Independent Soccer Association.

=== Career statistics ===
As of match played February 29, 2020.

Club	Season	League			National Cup (Note: Includes appearances in the U.S. Open Cup.)		Other		Total	
Club	Season	Division	Apps	Goals	Apps	Goals	Apps	Goals	Apps	Goals
AFC Ann Arbor	2017	NPSL	9	3	0	0	2	0	11	3
Saint Louis Club Atletico	2018	NPSL	2	0	0	0	0	0	2	0
South Georgia Tormenta FC	2019	USL League One	8	0	0	0	0	0	8	0
Chattanooga FC	2019–20	NISA	1	0	0	0	0	0	1	0
Chattanooga FC	2020–21	NISA	1	0	0	0	0	0	1	0
Chattanooga FC	Total		2	0	0	0	0	0	2	0
Career total			21	3	0	0	2	0	23	3
