= Kyle Carr (soccer) =

American soccer player

Personal information
- Date of birth: January 21, 1995 (age 31)
- Place of birth: Indialantic, Florida, United States
- Height: 1.83 m (6 ft 0 in)
- Position: Midfielder

Team information
- Current team: Chattanooga FC
- Number: 5

College career
Years	Team	Apps	(Gls)
2013	Taylor Trojans	18	(1)
2014	EFSC Titans	17	(0)
2015–2016	Liberty Flames	33	(1)

Senior career*
Years	Team	Apps	(Gls)
2018	Lansing United	12	(0)
2019	Lansing Ignite	24	(0)
2020–	Chattanooga FC	4	(0)
- * Club domestic league appearances and goals as of September 30, 2020

Kyle Carr (born January 21, 1995) is an American soccer player who plays as a midfielder for Chattanooga FC in the National Independent Soccer Association.

== Career ==
Carr played 2018 with Lansing United in the team's first season in the Premier Developmental League. Following the season and United's folding, Carr was signed to his first professional contract by Lansing Ignite FC ahead of the team's first season in the newly established USL League One. The team ceased operations following the 2019 season.

On February 27, 2020, Chattanooga FC announced it had signed Carr ahead of the team's first professional season in the National Independent Soccer Association.

=== Career statistics ===
As of match played September 30, 2020.

Club	Season	League			National Cup (Note: Includes appearances in U.S. Open Cup.)		Other		Total	
Club	Season	Division	Apps	Goals	Apps	Goals	Apps	Goals	Apps	Goals
Lansing United	2018	PDL	12	0	0	0	1	0	13	0
Lansing Ignite FC	2019	USL League One	24	0	0	0	1	0	25	0
Chattanooga FC	2020	NISA	1	0	0	0	0	0	1	0
Chattanooga FC	2020–21	NISA	3	0	0	0	4	0	7	0
Chattanooga FC	Total		4	0	0	0	4	0	8	0
Career total			40	0	0	0	6	0	46	0

== Honors ==
- Michigan Milk Cup: 2018
