= Richard Dickson =

Richard Dickson may refer to:

- Richard Dickson (American football), American football player
- Richard Watson Dickson (1759–1824), physician and agriculturalist
- Richard Dickson (curler), Scottish curler
- Rick Dickson, athletic director
- Richard Dickson (1792–1857), Scottish architect of R & R Dickson

== See also ==
- Richard Dixon (disambiguation)
