= Richard Dixon (USCG) =

United States Coast Guard coxwain

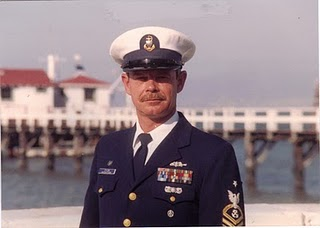
- USCG motor lifeboat coxswain Richard Dixon
- Military career
- Allegiance: United States of America
- Branch: United States Coast Guard
- Rank: Senior Chief Petty Officer
- Awards: Coast Guard Medal (x2)

Richard Dixon was the coxswain of a 44-foot motor lifeboat, during the July 4th weekend of 1980, when his skill and judgment enabled him to rescue two pleasure boat crews off Tillamook Bay, Oregon. During the first incident a 58-foot yacht was in distress in the aftermath of hurricane Celia, and needed to seek sheltered waters, but wave conditions seemed likely to batter it apart if it tried to use the narrow entrance between two stone jetties to enter Tillamook Bay's harbor. Dixon and the coxswain of another motor lifeboat maneuvered beside the yacht, to absorb some of the wave energy as it entered harbor.

In the second incident two pleasure boat occupants had fallen overboard and were within fifty feet of being dashed upon the harbor's breakwater. In spite of the danger of maneuvering so close to the crashing waves, in such high sea conditions, Dixon was able to rescue the pleasure boaters.

Dixon received Coast Guard Medals for both rescues.

== Coast Guard Medal citation (first award) ==
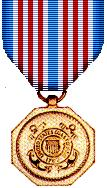

The President of the United States of America takes pleasure in presenting the Coast Guard Medal to Boatswain's Mate First Class Richard D. Dixon, United States Coast Guard, for heroism on the afternoon of 3 July 1980 while serving as the coxswain of Coast Guard Motor Lifeboat (MLB) 44409. During this period he was instrumental in preventing the yacht FANTASY ISLE, with 5 people onboard, from capsizing on the stormy Tillamook Bay entrance bar. To escape the remains of Tropical Storm CELIA, the owner/operator of FANTASY ISLE elected to seek shelter in Tillamook Bay, Oregon. Arriving outside the Bay in the late afternoon, the bar entrance was completely covered with breaking seas up to 30-feet in height. With the crew of FANTASY ISLE completely exhausted and seasick, the owner/operator believed he was in a "do-or-die" situation and informed Coast Guard Station Tillamook Bay that he was going to cross the bar. Two Coast Guard rescue boats were immediately dispatched to escort the yacht across the Bar. Arriving on scene two miles off-shore, Petty Officer Dixon placed his MLB behind FANTASY ISLE and took the first breaking wave broadside thereby taking the full force of the breaker before it could reach the yacht. Petty Officer Dixon continued this highly dangerous procedure, taking breaker after breaker, for the next forty minutes until FANTASY ISLE was safely inside Tillamook Bay. Petty Officer Dixon demonstrated remarkable initiative, exceptional fortitude and daring in spite of imminent personal danger during this incident. His unselfish actions, courage and unwavering devotion to duty reflect the highest credit upon himself and the United States Coast Guard.

== Coast Guard Medal citation (second award) ==
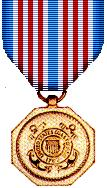

The President of the United States of America takes pleasure in presenting a Gold Star in lieu of a Second Award of the Coast Guard Medal to Boatswain's Mate First Class Richard D. Dixon, United States Coast Guard, for extraordinary heroism on the morning of 4 July 1980 while serving as coxswain of MLB 44409 from Coast Guard Station Tillamook Bay, Oregon. During this period he was instrumental in the rescue of 4 men from a cap-sized small pleasure craft in turbulent surf in the entrance to Tillamook Bay. The boat had dashed around the tip of the north entrance jetty, directly into the path of a 16 to 18 foot breaking sea. The boat capsized. Two of the four occupants were hurled through the windshield before being thrown into the turbulent sea. MLB 44409, on station as a safety boat during an escort operation, was in position one mile behind the capsized boat and was directed to attempt to make the pickup. Petty Officer Dixon skillfully maneuvered the MLB alongside the capsized boat, which resulted in the bow of the MLB being less than 50 to 60 feet from the rocks of the jetty with the stern facing into the breakers. Demonstrating exceptional seamanship, Petty Officer Dixon maintained this position, despite the pounding surf, until all four people were safely aboard the MLB. The slightest mistake in the 12 to 15 foot breakers would have caused the MLB to be tossed unmercifully upon the treacherous rocks with the resultant death to his crew and the victims of the capsized boat. Petty Officer Dixon demonstrated remarkable initiative, exceptional fortitude and daring in spite of imminent personal danger during this rescue mission. His unselfish actions, courage and unwavering devotion to duty reflect the highest credit upon himself and the United States Coast Guard.

== USCGC Richard Dixon ==
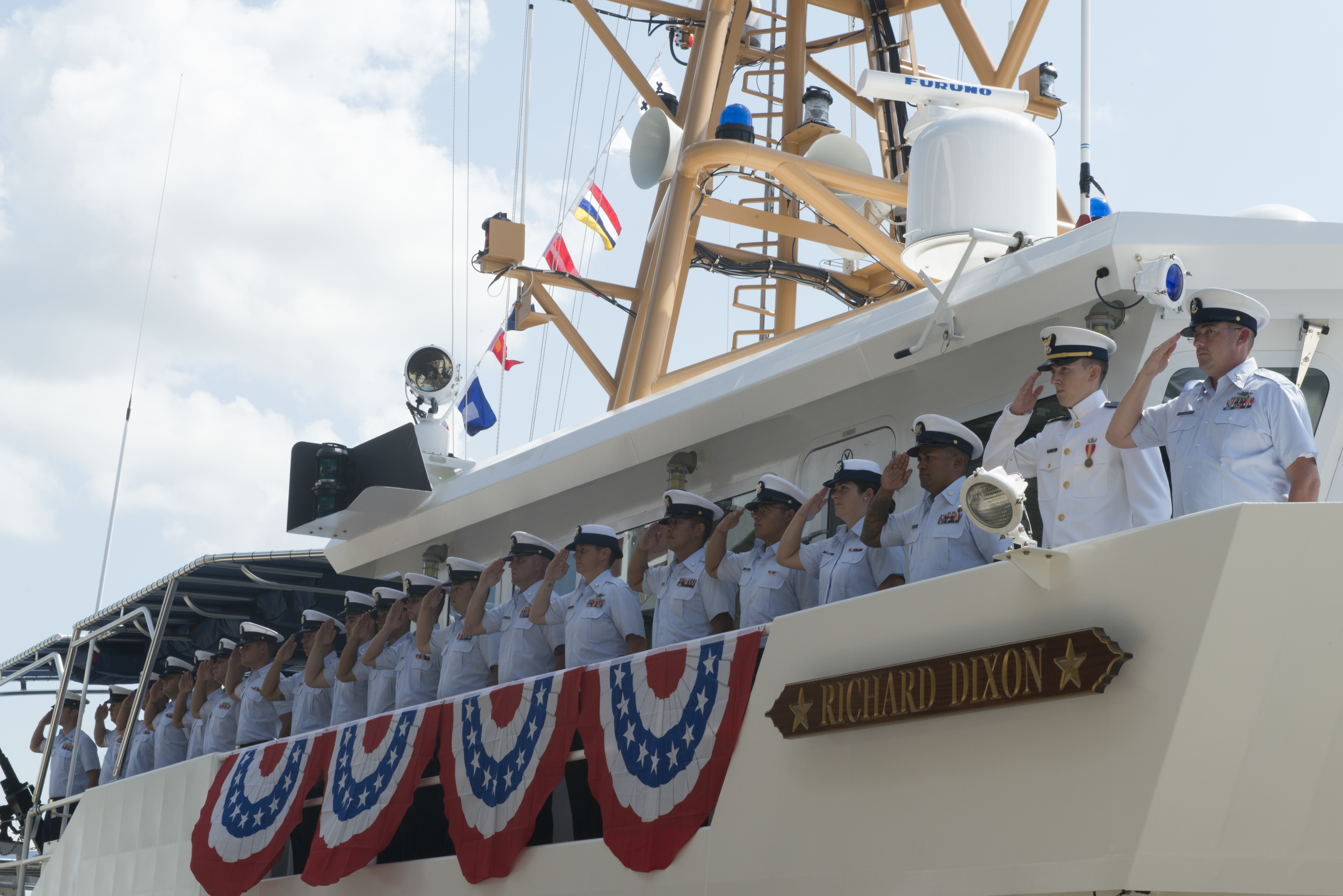
USCGC Richard Dixon being commissioned on 20 June 2015

In 2010 when the Coast Guard decided that all the new Sentinel class cutters would be named after Coast Guard personnel who had been recognized for their heroism Dixon was one of those to be honored. The thirteenth cutter in the class was named USCGC Richard Dixon. She was the first Sentinel class cutter to be homeported in Puerto Rico.
