= Ian McGrath =

American soccer player

Personal information
- Full name: Ian Thomas McGrath
- Date of birth: July 17, 1996 (age 30)
- Place of birth: Crestwood, Illinois, United States
- Height: 1.93 m (6 ft 4 in)
- Position: Midfielder

Youth career
- Chicago Fire

College career
| Years | Team | Apps | (Gls) |
| 2014–2017 | Evansville Purple Aces | 71 | (26) |

Senior career*
| Years | Team | Apps | (Gls) |
| 2016 | FC Buffalo | 10 | (3) |
| 2018 | Nashville SC | 0 | (0) |
| 2018 | → Inter Nashville FC (loan) | 7 | (3) |
| 2019 | Queen of the South | 11 | (0) |
| 2019 | Philadelphia Fury | 1 | (0) |
| 2019 | Oklahoma City Energy | 1 | (0) |
| 2020–2021 | Chattanooga FC | 8 | (4) |
- * Club domestic league appearances and goals

Ian Thomas McGrath (born July 17, 1996) is an American fiormer professional soccer player who played as a midfielder.

== Early and personal life ==
McGrath was born in Crestwood, Illinois, the middle of three brothers, and he attended Lincoln-Way West High School.

== Career ==
After playing at youth level for the Chicago Fire, McGrath played college soccer for the Evansville Purple Aces between 2014 and 2017. and scored 26 goals in 71 appearances.

McGrath spent time in the National Premier Soccer League with FC Buffalo in the 2016 season, and in the USL Championship with Nashville SC in the 2018 season. Whilst at Nashville, McGrath spent time on loan at Inter Nashville FC, also in the National Premier Soccer League, scoring one in 4 appearances.

In January 2019, McGrath signed for Scottish Championship club Queen of the South, after a successful two week trial. McGrath debuted on February 2, 2019, in a 3–0 league defeat versus the Bairns at the Falkirk Stadium.

In August 2019, McGrath signed for National Independent Soccer Association club Philadelphia Fury for the league's inaugural season.

In September 2019, McGrath signed for USL Championship club OKC Energy FC.

In February 2020, McGrath signed for Chattanooga FC ahead of its inaugural season in the National Independent Soccer Association. On February 29, he scored the first professional goal in the team's history against Oakland Roots SC.

== Career statistics ==
As of September 30, 2020.

| Club | Season | League | | | National Cup (Note: Includes appearances in Scottish Cup and U.S. Open Cup.) | | Other (Note: Includes appearances in the Scottish play-offs.) | | Total | |
| Club | Season | Division | Apps | Goals | Apps | Goals | Apps | Goals | Apps | Goals |
|---|---|---|---|---|---|---|---|---|---|---|
| FC Buffalo | 2016 | NPSL | 10 | 3 | 0 | 0 | 0 | 0 | 10 | 3 |
| Nashville SC | 2018 | United Soccer League | 0 | 0 | 0 | 0 | 0 | 0 | 0 | 0 |
| Inter Nashville FC (loan) | 2018 | NPSL | 7 | 3 | 0 | 0 | 1 | 0 | 8 | 3 |
| Queen of the South | 2018–19 | Scottish Championship | 11 | 0 | 1 | 0 | 2 | 0 | 14 | 0 |
| Philadelphia Fury | 2019 | NISA | 1 | 0 | 0 | 0 | 0 | 0 | 1 | 0 |
| OKC Energy FC | 2019 | USL Championship | 1 | 0 | 0 | 0 | 0 | 0 | 1 | 0 |
| Chattanooga FC | 2020 | NISA | 1 | 1 | 0 | 0 | 0 | 0 | 1 | 1 |
| Chattanooga FC | 2020–21 | NISA | 2 | 1 | 0 | 0 | 4 | 1 | 6 | 2 |
| Chattanooga FC | Total | | 3 | 2 | 0 | 0 | 4 | 1 | 7 | 3 |
| Career total | | | 33 | 8 | 1 | 0 | 7 | 1 | 41 | 9 |
