= USCGC Richard Dixon =

United States Coast Guard Sentinel-class cutter

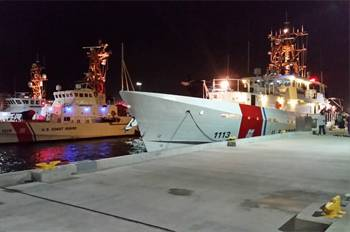
- Richard Dixon moored next to smaller cutters, in San Juan, Puerto Rico, 24 June 2015

History

United States
- Name: USCGC Richard Dixon
- Namesake: Richard Dixon
- Operator: United States Coast Guard
- Builder: Bollinger Shipyards, Lockport, Louisiana
- Commissioned: June 20, 2015
- Home port: San Juan, Puerto Rico
- Identification: WPC-1113; MMSI number: 338926413; Callsign: NDOA
- Motto: Initiative & fortitude
- Status: in active service
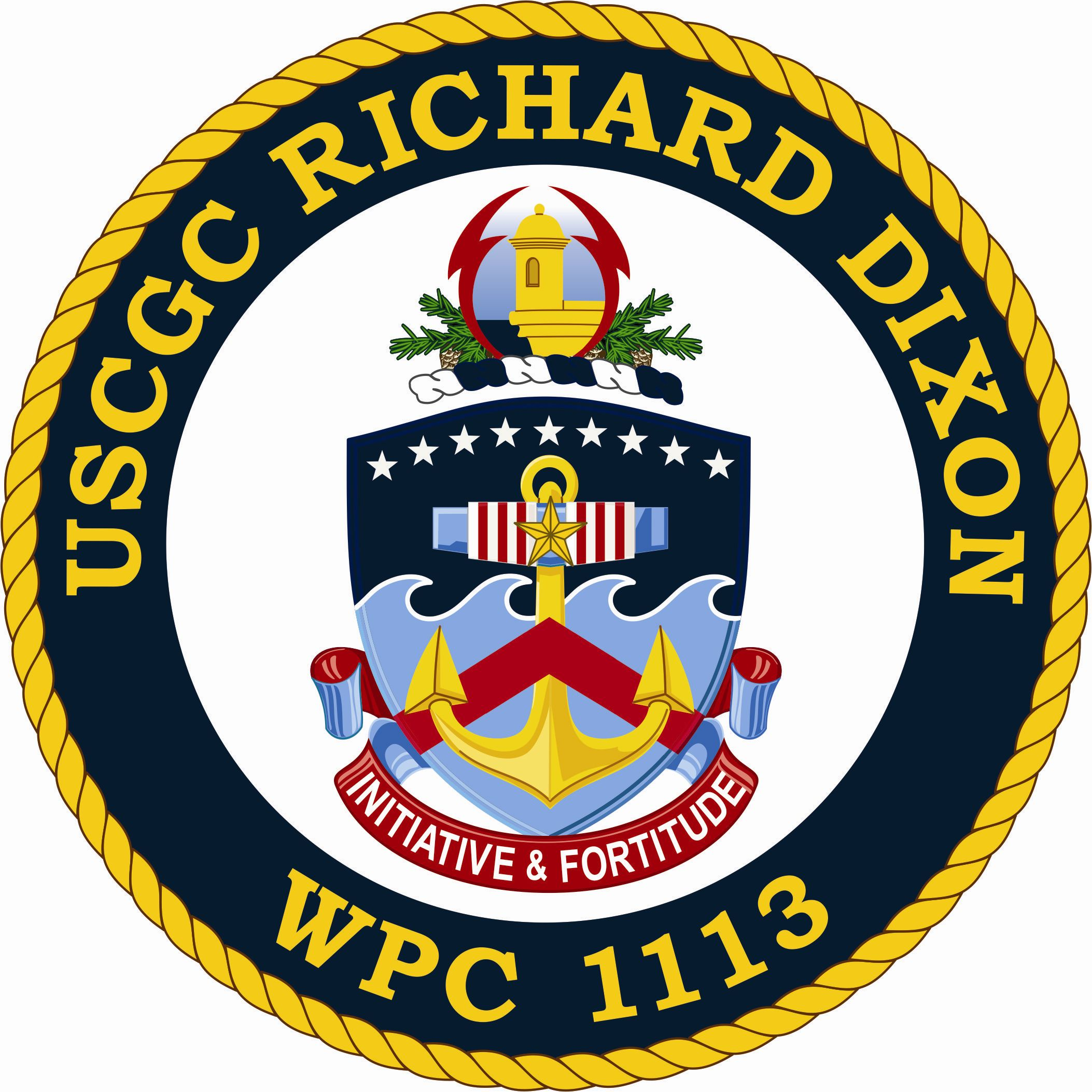
- Badge

General characteristics
- Class & type: Sentinel-class cutter
- Displacement: 353 long tons (359 t)
- Length: 153.5 ft (46.8 m)
- Beam: 25.43 ft (7.75 m)
- Draft: 8.46 ft (2.58 m)
- Propulsion: 2 × 4,300 kilowatts (5,800 shp); 1 × 75 kilowatts (101 shp) bow thruster
- Speed: 28 knots (52 km/h; 32 mph)
- Endurance: 5 days, 2,500 nautical miles (4,600 km; 2,900 mi); Designed to be on patrol 2,500 hours per year
- Boats & landing craft carried: 1 × Short Range Prosecutor RHIB
- Complement: 2 officers, 20 crew
- Sensors & processing systems: L-3 C4ISR suite
- Armament: 1 × Mk 38 Mod 2 25 mm automatic gun; 4 × crew-served Browning M2 machine guns

USCGC Richard Dixon is the United States Coast Guard's thirteenth Sentinel-class cutter. She supports multiple Coast Guard missions including port, waterway and coastal security, fishery patrols, drug and illegal immigrant law enforcement, search and rescue, and national defense operations. She was launched in 2015 and is assigned to Coast Guard Sector San Juan. The ship arrived in her home port of San Juan, Puerto Rico on June 24, 2015.

== Construction and characteristics ==
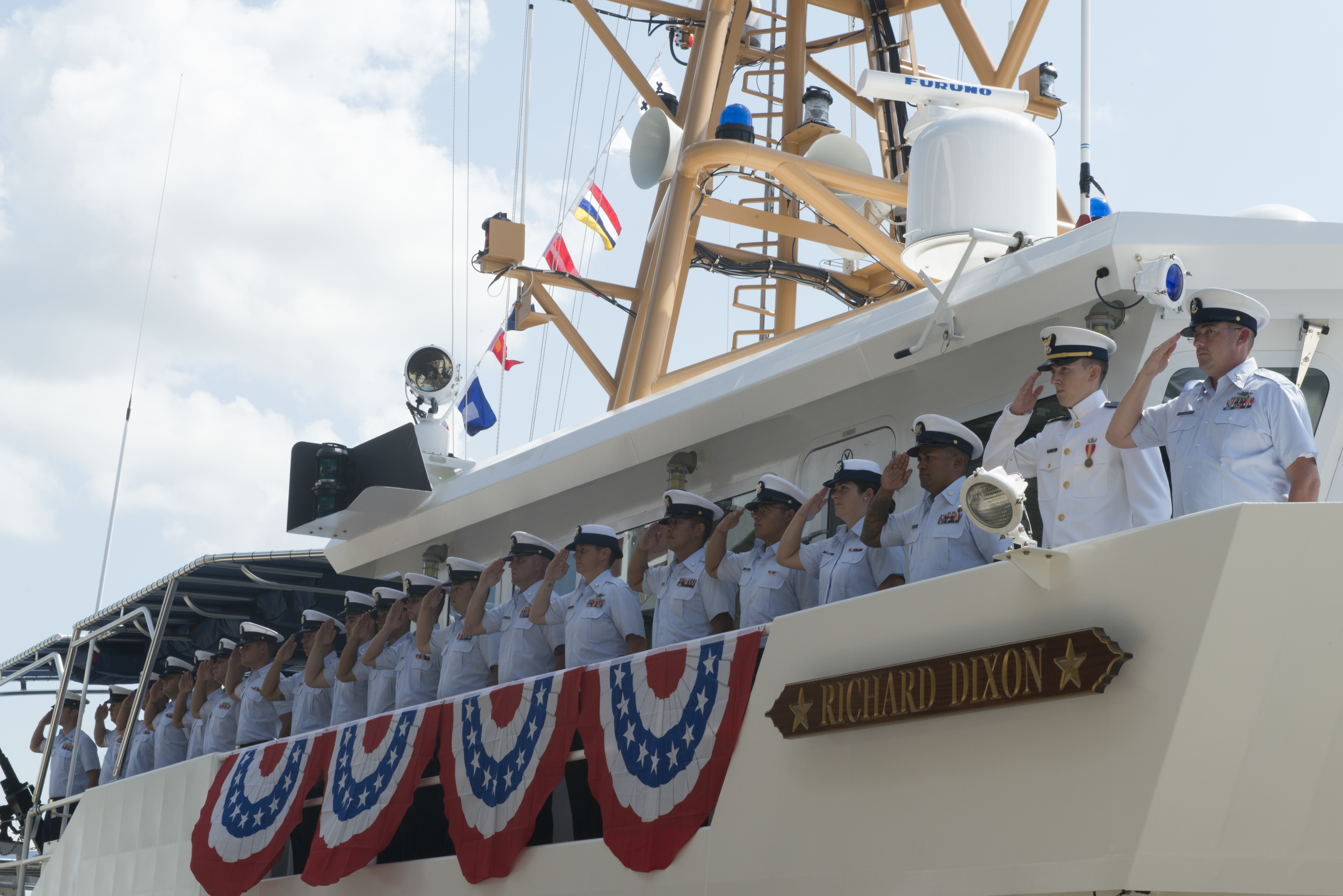
Richard Dixon during her commissioning ceremony in June 2015

The Coast Guard's Island-class cutters were launched between 1986 and 1992. On 26 September 2008 the Coast Guard awarded a contract to Bollinger Shipyards for the lead ship in the Sentinel class which would replace the aging Island class. This contract included options for an additional 33 ships, including Richard Dixon.

Richard Dixon was built by Bollinger Shipyards in Lockport, Louisiana. On 14 April 2015, she was delivered to the Coast Guard at Key West, Florida. Richard Dixon was commissioned at a ceremony in Tampa, Florida on 20 June 2015. It was attended by Virginia Dixon, widow of the ship's namesake.

Richard Dixon is 153.5 feet (46.8 m) long, with a beam of 25.43 feet (7.75 m), and a full-load draft of 8.46 feet (2.58 m). She displaces 353 tons when fully loaded. Her hull is built of welded steel plates, while her superstructure is made of aluminum.

The ship is propelled by two Tier II 20-cylinder mtu 20 V 4000 M93L Diesel engines which produce 5,676 horsepower each. These drive two six-bladed fixed-pitch propellers. This propulsion package gives her a continuous cruising speed of 28 knots. Her fuel tanks hold over 17,000 US gallons (64,000 L) giving Florence Finch an unrefueled range of 2,500 nautical miles at 15 knots. The ship is equipped with a Schottel STT 60K bow thruster.

Electrical power aboard is provided by two main ship-service generators and an emergency generator. The two ship service generators are Cummins QSM-11-DM Diesel engines driving Stanford 317 Kw generators. The emergency unit, which is housed in a separate room, is a Cummins 6BTA5.9-DM Diesel engine driving a Stanford 93 Kw generator.

The ship is equipped with Quantum QC1500 fin stabilizers to reduce rolling. Potable water can be produced from seawater with an onboard desalination plant. Satellite television is available in the crew mess area.

She is armed with a remotely-controlled, gyro-stabilized Mark 38 25 mm autocannon, four crew served M2 Browning machine guns, and light arms.

Richard Dixon, like all the Sentinel-class cutters, is equipped with a stern launching ramp, that allows her to launch and retrieve a rigid inflatable boat without first coming to a stop. Her cutter boat is useful for inspecting other vessels, and deploying boarding parties. It is equipped with an inboard Diesel engine which propels the boat by a jet drive.

Richard Dixon has a crew of 24 men and women. The Sentinel class was designed to accommodate mixed-gender crews, with small staterooms rather than large bunk rooms and individual heads. The captain and executive officer have private staterooms.

== Operational career ==
On September 20, 2015, Richard Dixon intercepted a "go fast" smuggling boat, near the Dominican Republic, intercepting 41 bales of marijuana the smugglers had tried to jettison prior to their capture.

In October 2015 the ship seized two loads of cocaine which weighed approximately 1,340 kilograms (2,950 lb) and were valued at $44.2 million.

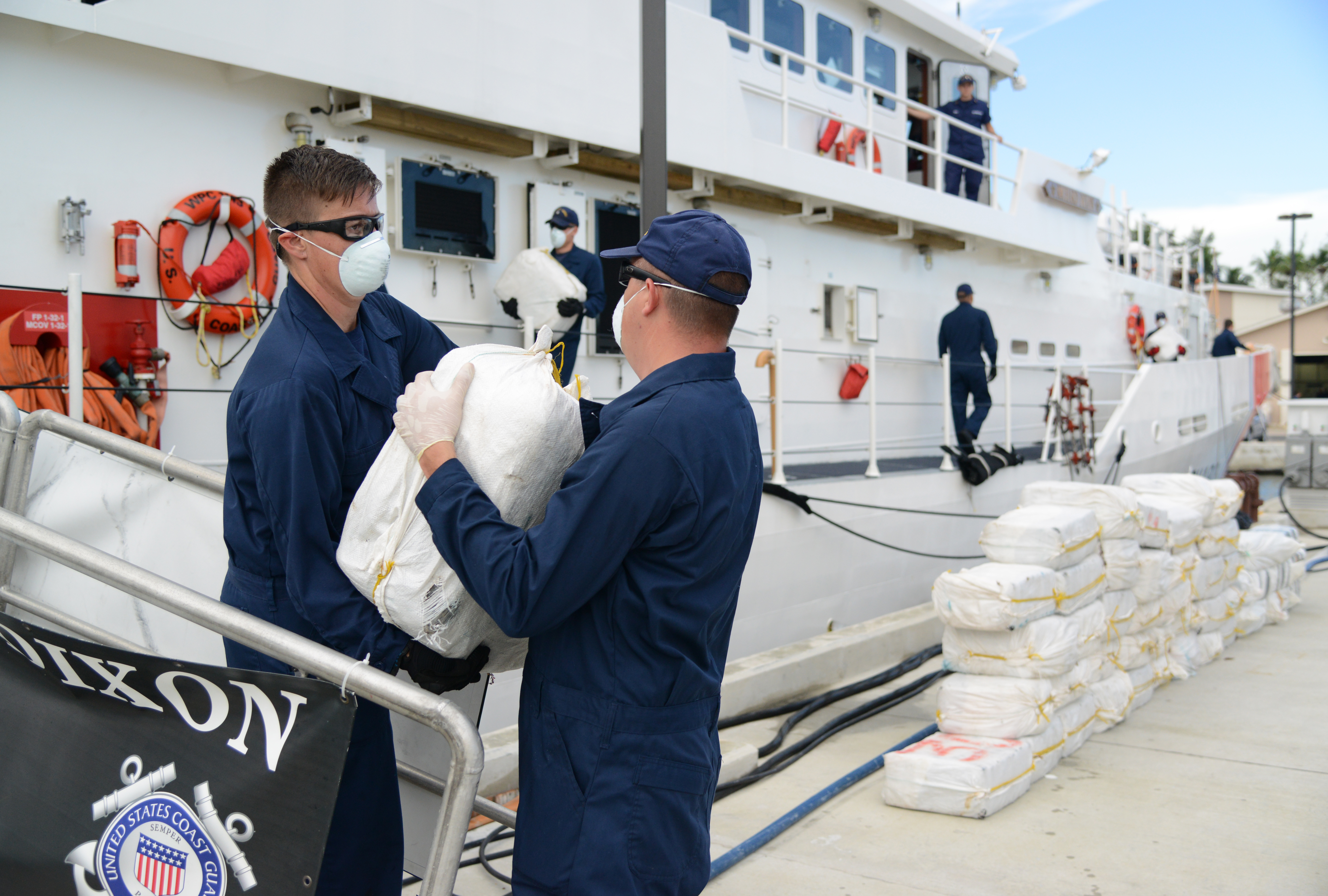
Crewmen unload bales of cocaine seized in October 2015

On March 9, 2016, air elements of the U.S. Customs and Border Protection agency requested Richard Dixon intercept a vessel with 25 refugees from the Dominican Republic. The Coast Guard subjects every refugee to a biometric recording, enabling them to recognize them if they make subsequent attempts to reach the United States. One individual was transferred to the U.S. for possible prosecution, while the other 24 were repatriated.

On April 2, 2016, Richard Dixon intercepted another small vessel from the Dominican Republic, carrying 20 refugees. Fourteen of the refugees were transferred to a Dominican naval vessel. Three of the remaining refugees were taken to the United States, for prosecution, because this was not their first attempt to enter the United States. The other three refugees were not Dominicans; they were believed to be from India. They were taken to the U.S. to be repatriated later.

On April 25, 2018, Coast Guard watchstanders in Sector San Juan diverted Richard Dixon to intercept a suspected vessel while Customs and Border Protection Caribbean Air and Marine Branch (CAMB) and Puerto Rico Police Joint Forces of Rapid Action positioned marine units that were also ready to respond. Richard Dixon arrived on scene and interdicted the go-fast, detained the suspected smugglers, a U.S. citizen from Puerto Rico and a national of the Dominican Republic and seized multiple bales of contraband, which tested positive for cocaine. Two smugglers, 491.5 kilograms of cocaine and 9.2 kilograms of heroin worth an estimated wholesale value of US$13.3 million were held.

On August 9, 2018, Richard Dixon intercepted two yola type vessels from the Dominican Republic carrying a total of 56 refugees. One of the refugees was brought ashore by Puerto Rico Police Joint Forces of Rapid Action while the rest were safely repatriated in the Dominican Republic.

On December 24, 2018, Richard Dixon intercepted a suspected vessel. She arrived on scene and interdicted the go-fast, detained the suspected smugglers, four citizens of the Dominican Republic and seized multiple bales of contraband, which tested positive for cocaine. 210 kilograms of cocaine were seized worth an estimated wholesale value of US$5 million dollars.

On May 13, 2019, Richard Dixon intercepted a yola type vessel from the Dominican Republic carrying a total of 20 refugees. Four of the refugees were brought ashore by Customs and Border Protection while the rest were safely repatriated in the Dominican Republic.

== Namesake ==
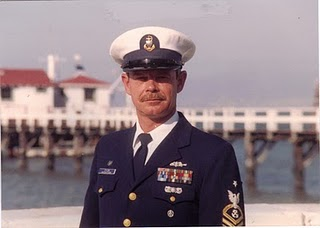
Senior Chief Boatswain's Mate Richard Dixon, the ship's namesake

The vessel is named after Richard Dixon, a Coast Guard hero.
