= Jordan Dunstan =

Canadian soccer player

Personal information
- Date of birth: March 21, 1993 (age 33)
- Place of birth: Mississauga, Ontario, Canada
- Height: 1.88 m (6 ft 2 in)
- Position: Defender

Youth career
- Dixie SC

College career
Years	Team	Apps	(Gls)
2014–2017	Bryan College Lions		

Senior career*
Years	Team	Apps	(Gls)
2014–2017	Chattanooga FC	34	(1)
2018	Nashville SC	1	(0)
2018	→ Inter Nashville (loan)	5	(0)
2019–2020	Chattanooga FC	10	(1)
2020	Forge FC	6	(0)
- * Club domestic league appearances and goals as of September 12, 2020

Jordan Dunstan (born March 21, 1993) is a Canadian professional soccer player who most recently played as a defender for Forge FC.

== Club career ==
=== Youth and college ===
Dunstan played soccer at Bryan College from 2015 to 2017. He also played for NPSL side Chattanooga FC from 2014 to 2017. On May 27, 2015, Dunstan tore his ACL in a match against Atlanta Silverbacks. He spent most of 2016 recovering and did not return to full fitness until late in the year.

=== Nashville SC ===
On January 16, 2018, Nashville SC announced the signing of Jordan Dunstan ahead of their inaugural USL campaign. Dunstan returned from loan to Inter Nashville FC in July, and made his first USL appearance on July 25 in a 1–0 win over Atlanta United 2. On November 14, 2018, Nashville announced that they had not re-signed Dunstan for the 2019 season.

=== Forge FC ===
On July 31, 2020, Dunstan signed with Canadian Premier League side Forge FC.
