= Erik Panzer =

New Zealand footballer (born 1993)

Personal information
- Date of birth: 1993 (age 32–33)
- Place of birth: New Zealand
- Position: Defender

Team information
- Current team: Melville United

College career
Years	Team	Apps	(Gls)
2012–2015	Quinnipiac Bobcats		

Senior career*
Years	Team	Apps	(Gls)
2011–2012	Canterbury United	0	(0)
2016–2017	Truro City	9	(0)
2017	Nordvärmlands FF	3	(0)
2017	Team Wellington	8	(0)
2018	Western Suburbs		
2018–2019	Southern United	18	(0)
2019	Olympic FC	12	(1)
2019–2020	Southern United	9	(0)
2020	Chattanooga FC		
2022	Ferrymead Bays	7	(2)
2022	FC Buffalo		
2023	Melville United	27	(4)
- * Club domestic league appearances and goals

Erik Panzer (born 1993) is a New Zealand footballer who plays as a defender for Melville United.

== Early life, education and family ==
Panzer was born in 1993 in New Zealand. He played cricket and rugby as a child. He attended Quinnipiac University in the United States where he majored in psychology. Panzer's mother died in 2019. He has a sister.

== Career ==
Panzer started his career with New Zealand side Canterbury United. In 2016, he signed for English side Truro City. Panzer mainly operates as a defender. He has also operated as a midfielder.
