= Nick Spielman =

American soccer player (born 1996)

Personal information
- Full name: Nicholas Spielman
- Date of birth: August 2, 1996 (age 30)
- Place of birth: Melbourne, Florida, United States
- Height: 1.87 m (6 ft 2 in)
- Positions: Defender; midfielder

Team information
- Current team: Spokane Velocity
- Number: 3

College career
Years	Team	Apps	(Gls)
2014–2015	Lincoln Memorial Railsplitters	32	(3)
2016–2018	East Tennessee State Buccaneers	38	(3)

Senior career*
Years	Team	Apps	(Gls)
2016	Peachtree City MOBA	13	(1)
2017–2018	Ocean City Nor'easters	10	(0)
2019	North Carolina Fusion U23	14	(2)
2020–2022	Chattanooga FC	50	(1)
2023–2025	Charlotte Independence	84	(3)
2026–	Spokane Velocity	18	(1)
- * Club domestic league appearances and goals as of November 3, 2026

Nicholas Spielman (born August 2, 1996) is an American soccer player who plays as a defender for Spokane Velocity in the USL League One.

== Career ==
=== College and amateur ===
Spielman began playing college soccer at Lincoln Memorial University in 2014. He spent two seasons with the Railsplitters, where he made 32 appearances, scoring three goals and tallying one assist. In 2017, he transferred to East Tennessee State University. Here he made 38 appearances for the Buccaneers between 2016 and 2018 and netted three goals all in the 2017 season, where he also received All-SoCon second team and tournament team selections.

During and after his time at college Spielman has multiple spells playing in the USL PDL, later renamed the USL League Two. He spent 2016 with Peachtree City MOBA, making 13 appearances and scoring a single goal. In 2017 he played with Ocean City Nor'easters, making ten appearances. He returned to the Nor'easters in 2018, but didn't appear for the club. His final spell in the USL League Two was with North Carolina Fusion U23 in 2019, netting twice in 14 regular season games.

=== Professional ===
In February 2020 Spielman signed his first professional contract with National Independent Soccer Association side Chattanooga FC. He went on to make 52 appearances for the team over three seasons in all competitions, netting one goal.

On March 16, 2023, Spielman was announced as a new signing for USL League One side Charlotte Independence ahead of their 2023 season.

On March 9, 2026, Spielman was announced as a new signing for USL League One side Spokane Velocity for the 2026 season.
