= Markus Naglestad =

Norwegian footballer (born 1991)

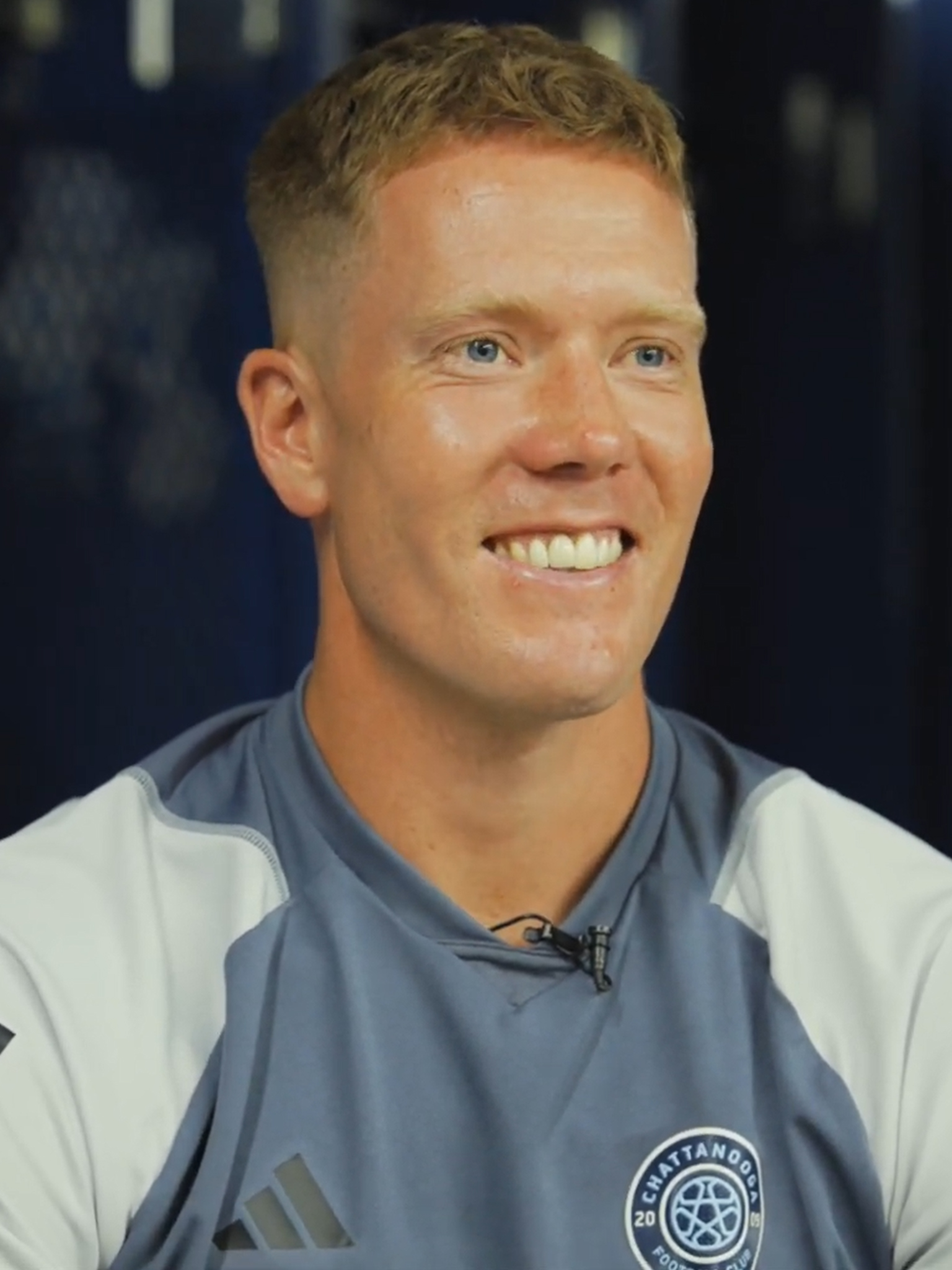
- Naglestad in 2024

Personal information
- Full name: Markus Kvame Naglestad
- Date of birth: 26 April 1991 (age 35)
- Place of birth: Kristiansand, Norway
- Position: Forward

Youth career
- 2006–2008: Våg
- 2006: IK Start

College career
| Years | Team | Apps | (Gls) |
| 2010–2011 | Bridgeport Purple Knights | 33 | (23) |
| 2012–2014 | Providence Friars | 44 | (12) |

Senior career*
| Years | Team | Apps | (Gls) |
| 2009–2010 | Våg | | |
| 2012 | Connecticut FC Azul | 3 | (1) |
| 2013–2014 | Donn | 5 | (14) |
| 2015 | Gjøvik-Lyn | 28 | (28) |
| 2016 | Fram Larvik | 25 | (26) |
| 2017 | Sandefjord | 6 | (0) |
| 2017 | HamKam | 8 | (9) |
| 2018 | Hødd | 25 | (15) |
| 2019 | Egersund | 27 | (26) |
| 2020 | Hartford Athletic | 6 | (1) |
| 2021–2025 | Chattanooga FC | 116 | (60) |
- * Club domestic league appearances and goals as of September 21, 2025

Markus Naglestad (born 26 April 1991) is a Norwegian footballer who plays as a forward.

== Career ==
Naglestad started his career as a youth at Våg. He had a short spell with IK Start in 2006.

He featured for Våg in the 3. divisjon – the 4th tier of Norwegian football – in 2009 and 2010. As a 19-year-old, he moved to the US for studies. There he was voted both East Coast Conference Men's Soccer Offensive Player of the Year, and Rookie of the Year, by the league's coaches after his first season out of two seasons with Bridgeport Purple Knights of the NCAA Division II. He then spent two seasons with Providence Friars of NCAA Division I, before being drafted by New York City of Major League Soccer on 20 January 2015, but failed to sign a contract due to a knee injury.

On 9 November 2018, Naglestad signed with Egersunds IK for the 2019 season.

In August 2020, he signed with Hartford Athletic of the USL Championship.

On 16 February 2021, Naglestad signed with National Independent Soccer Association (NISA) side Chattanooga FC ahead of the Spring 2021 season. He was the top scorer in NISA in the 2022 season, and again in the 2023 season. Naglestad left the club before the team's debut in MLS Next Pro in 2024, but was later brought back on board in August 2024. In November 2024, the club announced that Naglestad would be re-signed to join for the 2025 season.

== Career statistics ==
As of 21 September 2025

| Season | Club | Division | League | | Cup | | Total | |
| Season | Club | Division | Apps | Goals | Apps | Goals | Apps | Goals |
|---|---|---|---|---|---|---|---|---|
| 2015 | Gjøvik-Lyn | 2. divisjon | 26 | 26 | 3 | 2 | 29 | 28 |
| 2016 | Fram Larvik | 2. divisjon | 24 | 25 | 2 | 1 | 26 | 26 |
| 2017 | Sandefjord | Eliteserien | 6 | 0 | 0 | 0 | 6 | 0 |
| 2017 | HamKam | 2. divisjon | 8 | 9 | 0 | 0 | 8 | 9 |
| 2018 | Hødd | 2. divisjon | 25 | 13 | 4 | 2 | 29 | 15 |
| 2019 | Egersund | 2. divisjon | 26 | 25 | 2 | 1 | 28 | 26 |
| 2020 | Hartford | USL Championship | 8 | 1 | 0 | 0 | 8 | 1 |
| 2021 | Chattanooga FC | NISA | 21 | 8 | 3 | 5 | 27 | 15 |
| 2022 | Chattanooga FC | NISA | 26 | 19 | 2 | 1 | 28 | 20 |
| 2023 | Chattanooga FC | NISA | 23 | 15 | 3 | 2 | 32 | 23 |
| 2024 | Chattanooga FC | MLS Next Pro | 6 | 0 | 0 | 0 | 6 | 0 |
| 2025 | Chattanooga FC | MLS Next Pro | 17 | 1 | 2 | 1 | 23 | 2 |
| Career Total | | | 216 | 142 | 21 | 15 | 250 | 165 |
