= Tate Robertson =

American soccer player (born 1997)

Personal information
- Full name: Tate Boswell Robertson
- Date of birth: May 31, 1997 (age 29)
- Place of birth: Springfield, Ohio, U.S.
- Height: 1.78 m (5 ft 10 in)
- Position: Midfielder

Team information
- Current team: Chattanooga FC
- Number: 3

Youth career
- 2011–2015: Ohio Galaxies

College career
Years	Team	Apps	(Gls)
2015–2018	Bowling Green Falcons	71	(8)

Senior career*
Years	Team	Apps	(Gls)
2018–2019	Dayton Dutch Lions	24	(8)
2019–2020	Stumptown Athletic	6	(1)
2021–2022	Chattanooga FC	41	(0)
2023–2024	Lexington SC	53	(4)
2025–	Chattanooga FC	40	(12)
- * Club domestic league appearances and goals as of 23:02, 13 May 2026 (UTC)

Tate Boswell Robertson (born May 31, 1997) is an American soccer player who plays as a midfielder for MLS Next Pro club Chattanooga FC.

== Career ==
=== College and amateur ===
Robertson played four years of college soccer at Bowling Green University between 2015 and 2018, scoring 8 goals and tallying 22 assists in 71 appearances.

During and after college, Robertson also appeared for USL League Two side Dayton Dutch Lions during their 2018 and 2019 seasons. During 2018, Robertson was named in the USL PDL Best XI for the 2018 season.

=== Professional ===
In September 2019, Robertson signed for NISA side Stumptown Athletic ahead of the league's inaugural season. He scored his first goal with the team on February 29, 2020, against San Diego 1904 FC.

On January 28, 2021, Robertson signed with NISA side Chattanooga FC ahead of the Spring 2021 season.

Robertson joined USL League One expansion club Lexington SC on January 12, 2023. He was released by Lexington following their 2024 season.

In December 2024, Robertson returned to Chattanooga FC on a one-year deal ahead of their debut season in the MLS Next Pro.
