= Richard Dixon (footballer, born 1990) =

Jamaican footballer (born 1990)

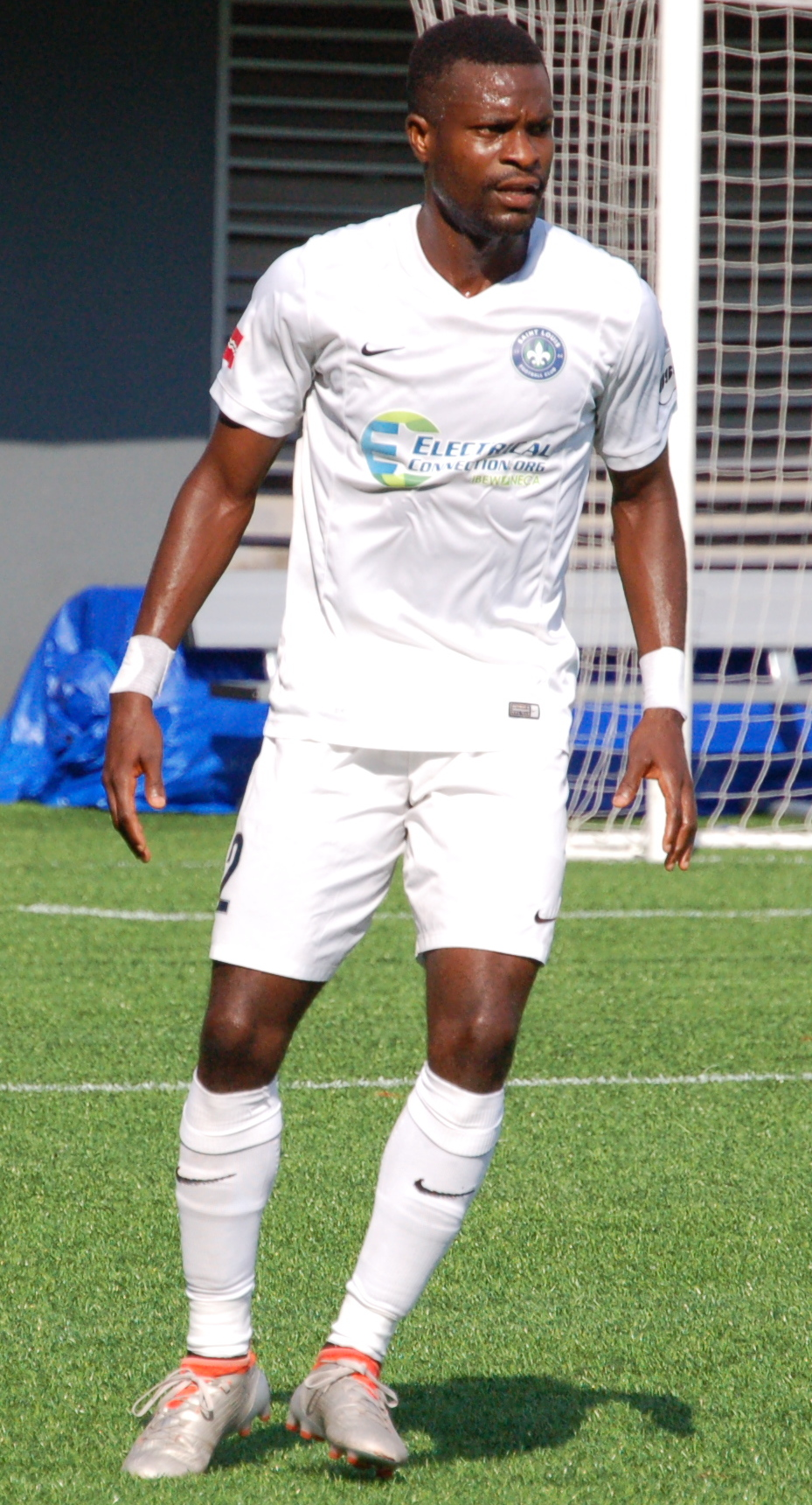
- Dixon playing for Saint Louis in 2016

Personal information
- Date of birth: 23 February 1990 (age 36)
- Place of birth: Hanover, Jamaica
- Height: 1.77 m (5 ft 10 in)
- Position: Defender

College career
Years	Team	Apps	(Gls)
2009–2012	West Florida Argonauts		

Senior career*
Years	Team	Apps	(Gls)
2009	Baton Rouge Capitals	13	(0)
2010–2011	Mississippi Brilla	20	(0)
2012	Panama City Beach Pirates	1	(0)
2013	VSI Tampa Bay	15	(0)
2014	Charlotte Eagles	18	(0)
2015–2016	Saint Louis	34	(0)
2017–2018	Oklahoma City Energy	49	(0)
2019	Chattanooga Red Wolves	6	(1)
2020–2023	Chattanooga	46	(0)

Managerial career
- 2026–: Chattanooga
- * Club domestic league appearances and goals

Richard Dixon (born 23 February 1990) is a Jamaican former footballer and manager. He played for several teams in the United States before his retirement in 2023. Dixon has been the head coach of Chattanooga FC since 2026.

== Career ==
=== College and amateur ===
Dixon played four years of college soccer at the University of West Florida.

During his time at college, Dixon also played for USL PDL clubs Mississippi Brilla in 2010 and 2011 and Panama City Beach Pirates in 2012.

=== Professional ===
Dixon signed his first professional contract in 2013, signing for new USL Pro franchise VSI Tampa Bay FC. After Tampa Bay folded at the end of their debut season, Dixon signed with USL Pro team Charlotte Eagles.

On 15 January 2015, it was announced that Dixon signed with USL expansion side Saint Louis FC. While with the club that year, he was slated to join the Jamaica national team for the Copa América and Gold Cup tournaments that summer, but was ultimately not named to the final tournament roster for either competition after suffering an injury during a U.S. Open Cup match against Minnesota United FC.

Dixon was released by Saint Louis FC on 10 November 2016.

In January 2020, Dixon was announced as the first-ever professional player signing by Chattanooga FC.
