= Chattanooga FC =

American professional soccer club based in Chattanooga

- Full name: Chattanooga Football Club
- Short name: CFC
- Founded: 2009; 17 years ago
- Stadium: Finley Stadium; Chattanooga, Tennessee
- Capacity: 20,668
- Chairman: Davis Grizzard
- Head coach: Richard Dixon
- League: MLS Next Pro
- 2026: 2nd, Eastern Conference; Playoffs: Champions
- Website: www.chattanoogafc.com
Home colors	Away colors

Chattanooga Football Club is an American professional soccer team based in Chattanooga, Tennessee, United States. Founded in 2009, the team has been a member of third-tier professional league MLS Next Pro since 2024. The club previously played in the National Independent Soccer Association and the Southeast Division of the National Premier Soccer League (NPSL), a national amateur league at the fourth tier.

The team's colors are navy blue and white; home games are played at Finley Stadium in Chattanooga. In 2019, Chattanooga FC became the first American sports team to offer ownership shares to the public and its fans under the crowdfunding rules of JOBS Act.

== History ==
=== Initial seasons (2009–2013) ===
Chattanooga FC was founded in 2009 by Tim Kelly, Krue Brock, Marshall Brock, Paul Rustand, Sean McDaniel, Daryl Heald, Hamilton Brock, Thomas Clark, and Sheldon Grizzle to play in the National Premier Soccer League (NPSL), the fourth tier of the American soccer pyramid and considered roughly equal to the USL Premier Development League. The team completed its inaugural season third in the Southeast Division with 4 wins and 3 losses.

After the struggles of its first season, Chattanooga FC's run in 2010 included winning the conference and it got them to the NPSL finals. The season ended with a loss in the 2010 NPSL Championship game to the Sacramento Gold by a score of 3–1. After a disappointing 3rd-place finish to the 2011 season and missing the playoffs, Chattanooga FC came back stronger than ever in 2012, taking 1st place in the newly created South Southeast Conference West, and defeating the reigning NPSL champion Jacksonville United FC 4–1 in Jacksonville to clinch it. Because of a collapse of the South-South Central Conference structure, a one-game playoff to determine the South Conference Champion was held with the Georgia Revolution, the victors of the South Southeast Conference East in Conyers, GA. Chattanooga won the game 1–0 on Luis Trude's 72nd-minute goal to advance to the 2012 NPSL National Finals in San Diego, CA. After defeating the Bay Area Ambassadors 3–2, and advancing to the NPSL Championship game, Chattanooga lost again in the title game 0–1 to FC Sonic on a header in the 78th minute. This was the 2nd NPSL Championship game that Chattanooga FC lost.

Chattanooga FC's 2013 season started with the expansion of the South Region into four divisions, with Chattanooga placed in the Southeast Division of the South Conference with 5 other teams. Chattanooga again prevailed at the top of the division, but because of one loss, had to go on the road for the Regional Playoffs. Chattanooga traveled to Tulsa, Oklahoma to face the undefeated and top seeded Tulsa Athletics who won the South Central Division. After a 0–0 draw, the match went to penalty kicks. Keeper, Greggaa Hartley, converted an incredible 3 saves in 3 chances, and Chattanooga made all 3 of their chances to advance to the Regional Final in Richmond, VA. Chattanooga FC lost the Regional Final 1–0 to eventual NPSL champions RVA Football Club. For the 2013 season, 4 Chattanooga FC members were selected to the 2013 All-NPSL Team – more than any other team. Those players were: GK Greggaa Hartley, DF Andrew Stewart, DF Nicholas Chase, and MF Fynn Glover. MF Thibault Charmey was also included in the NPSL Supporter's XI along with Hartley, Stewart, and Glover.

=== Continued success and Hank Steinbrecher Trophy (2014–2017) ===
2014 started with former Chattanooga FC player Mark Sherrod being drafted by the Houston Dynamo of Major League Soccer in the second-round of the 2014 MLS SuperDraft. For the season, Chattanooga FC launched a Women's Soccer Team in the WPSL for the first time. In their inaugural season, the women's team finished 5–3–2, for third in the Southeast. Chattanooga FC's regular season started off slow, but ended with 5 straight wins to close the season on top of the division once again by goal difference over the Atlanta Silverbacks Reserves. For 2014, the playoff format changed to a playoff to determine the Southeast Champions. The playoff was hosted by Chattanooga as the regular season champions. Chattanooga defeated Nashville FC 6–1 and then the New Orleans Jesters 4–0 to advance to the Regional Playoffs.

Although given the lowest seed in the Regional Playoffs, Chattanooga also played host to the Regional Playoffs. Chattanooga went on to defeat top seeded Miami United F.C. 2–0 and the Tulsa Athletics once again 2–0 in a rematch of 2013's Regional Match. Chattanooga would next host the Sacramento Gold in a rematch of the 2010 NPSL Championship game. They would end up rallying from an early 0–1 deficit to win 4–1, advancing to the finals for the third time in the club's existence. Chattanooga FC lost to the New York Red Bulls U-23 3–1. Forward Luke Winter and keeper Gregory Hartley were named to the All-NPSL squad, with Hartley also taking home honors with the NPSL Golden Glove award. Head Coach Bill Elliot was also awarded the Alexander Arellano Memorial Trophy for top NPSL Coach.

The 2015 season saw 2014 standout midfielder Niall McCabe sign with Louisville City FC in March. Chattanooga FC was also selected to host the US Soccer Amateur Championships on May 29–30, also known as the Hank Steinbrecher Trophy, in a competition matching the previous years winners of PDL, NPSL, and USASA Open and Amateur Championships. In May, CFC opened league play winning the first two matches on the road in Georgia. U.S. Open Cup play started at home against Ocala Stampede in the first round. After a late goal by Luke Winter to tie the game in regulation, the game went to extra time, with Gregga Hartley saving two penalties, and converting the winning one himself. Hartley was named TheCup.us 's Player of the Round.

The 2nd round of the Cup was away at Wilmington Hammerheads, and went to penalty kicks again after 1–1 in regulation. Chattanooga converted all 5 kicks, and saved one of Wilmington's to advance to host Atlanta Silverbacks once again in 3rd Round. Chattanooga FC took the lead late in the game on a Luke Winter header, but a controversial penalty was called just a minute later. Atlanta equalized and won the game in Extra Time, 2–1 the final. Just 2 days after the defeat Chattanooga FC hosted the Maryland Bays, the 2014 USASA Open Cup Champions, for the opening game for the Hank Steinbrecher Trophy tournament. Chattanooga won that game 2–0, and the next day defeated the Michigan Bucks, the 2014 PDL season Champions 3–0 to win the trophy, Chattanooga FC's first. On August 8, 2015, Chattanooga FC and Finley Stadium hosted the NPSL National Championship between CFC and New York Cosmos B. The game drew a U.S. amateur soccer attendance record with 18,227 fans witnessing a thrilling match won by the Cosmos, 3–2 in extra time. In 2016, Chattanooga FC won all of its games 9–0 and was first in the Southeast Division. The team advanced to the Southeast Conference playoffs, where they beat Memphis City FC 2–1. After the win over Memphis, Chattanooga FC managed to advance to the Regional Finals of the NPSL Playoffs, where they won in a penalty shootout to Miami United FC 5–3.

In January 2017, Chattanooga FC announced a partnership with VfL Wolfsburg, which plays in the German Bundesliga. The two teams mentioned the future possibility of international friendlies.

=== Transitioning to professional status (2018–present) ===
A professional USL League One franchise, later named Chattanooga Red Wolves SC, was established in 2018. Chattanooga FC accused the new team of trying to take over the local market after they hired then-current general manager Sean McDaniel. The Red Wolves also unsuccessfully attempted to arrange a lease at Finley Stadium and takeover of Chattanooga's youth academy. The city's women's team was transferred to the Red Wolves organization in 2019.

On November 15, 2018, the NPSL announced that it was creating a new, fully professional division and that Chattanooga would be one of its founding teams. In anticipation of moving to a professional roster and schedule, Chattanooga began a fan ownership initiative that was partially modeled after the Green Bay Packers. The initiative raised more than $800,000 with almost 3,000 new owners for the club from all 50 states and 25 different countries.

On August 15, 2019, it was announced that Chattanooga FC would instead join the National Independent Soccer Association. In preparation for the team's move to the professional ranks it was announced that Jeremy Alumbaugh, formerly the general manager of Saint Louis FC, as the team's managing director, while Bill Elliot would transition from his role as coach to Technical Director and Peter Fuller would take over the head coach role full-time.

After having three years of success in NISA, winning all three Independent Cups and finishing first in the 2023 NISA season, Chattanooga FC announced that starting in 2024 that they would join MLS Next Pro, the other third tier professional soccer division in America, which serves as a reserve league for Major League Soccer. Chattanooga FC became the fourth independent club to become part of MLS Next Pro.

Chattanooga's first season in MLS Next Pro, in 2024, began well under head coach and sporting director Rod Underwood, with the club among the league's early leaders, but a mid-season slump followed. Underwood was dismissed in late September with two regular-season matches remaining, and assistant coach Chris Nugent took over on an interim basis. The team finished ninth in the Eastern Conference on 45 points, level with three clubs that qualified but missing the last playoff place on a tiebreaker. Nugent was named permanent head coach for 2025, and in that second season the club reached the playoffs for the first time, becoming the first independent club in the league to host a playoff match before losing to Huntsville City FC.

In February 2026, the club and Nugent mutually parted ways, and Richard Dixon, the club's first professional signing in 2020 and a member of the coaching staff since retiring as a player in 2023, was named interim head coach. The interim tag was removed on August 3, when he signed a multiyear contract as the club's sixth head coach. Chattanooga set club records that season with 15 wins and 56 points, finishing second in the Eastern Conference. The club overturned a two-goal deficit to beat Columbus Crew 2 in the Eastern Conference final on November 1, with a stoppage-time winner from Farid Sar-Sar. Chattanooga FC became the first independent club to win the MLS Next Pro Cup, defeating Los Angeles FC 2 in the 2026 final at Finley Stadium. Damien Barker John scored the lone goal of the match, which was played before a playoff-record crowd of 10,228 spectators.

== Supporters and attendance ==
The predominant supporters' group of Chattanooga FC is known as the Chattahooligans. Over the years, the supporter group has established several traditions, which the club has incorporated into home match proceedings such as a pregame Chattahooligan march-in and the a cappella leading of the National Anthem.

Chattanooga FC boasts the highest average and single-game attendance in the NPSL. In its inaugural match on May 16, 2009, over 1,600 fans watched Chattanooga FC host Atlanta FC. In their second home match, held on June 7, 2009, over 1,500 watched as CFC notched their first win in club history over Saturn FC. Over 2,100 fans watched as CFC tied eventual divisional champs Rocket City United on June 20, 2009. In their final home game of the season, held July 4, 2009, over 3,000 fans witnessed CFC's victory over Birmingham, Alabama's Pumas FC. The club's average season attendance for league games was approximately 2,100. In its second season, CFC continued to build upon its remarkably high attendance figures. In the season-beginning league match-up against Pumas FC on June 5, 2010, attendance numbers hit over 3,000. The second league game on June 19, 2010, drew over 2,900 fans to witness CFC host Atlanta FC. On July 4, 2010, an NPSL record crowd of over 3,400 watched CFC take on league newcomer FC Tulsa. CFC beat all NPSL attendance records, for a regular season game, on July 17, 2010 when 5,117 fans watched the CFC defeat Rocket City United 4–0. The club's average attendance for their second season was approximately 4,400 per game (including a 6,317 home attendance count against non-league opponent F.C. Atlas's Under-20 squad.)

In 2014, Chattanooga FC continued its high attendance, drawing more than 3,000 in the final two home games of the regular season, as well as US Open Cup attendance of 4,058 against the Atlanta Silverbacks. Hosting the Southeast Division conference tournament, Chattanooga FC games drew 3,101 against Nashville FC and 2,802 against New Orleans Jesters. In hosting the South Region tournament, the game against Miami United F.C. drew 2,011 in heavy rain, and 3,218 against Tulsa Athletics, putting total attendance at over 25,000 for the season. On July 26, 2014, the team set a league attendance record of 8,878 during their playoff against the Sacramento Gold. In 2015, Chattanooga opened their home schedule against Ocala Stampede in the 1st round of the 2015 Lamar Hunt U.S. Open Cup with just under 2500 in attendance, likely the highest attended match in the round. After 4 home matches, Chattanooga FC had already drawn 10,000 for the season. In 2015, 18,227 came to the Finley Stadium for the match between Chattanooga FC and New York Cosmos B. It became a US 4th tier record. In February 2017, MLS expansion club Atlanta United came to Chattanooga for a friendly, which drew approximately 12,400 fans to Finley Stadium.

Chattanooga FC also reported the highest average and single-game attendances in NISA after turning professional. In its first MLS Next Pro season in 2024, the best-attended regular-season match at Finley Stadium drew 4,741 for a July 27 meeting with Orlando City B. In 2025, the club's U.S. Open Cup second-round match against local USL League One rival Chattanooga Red Wolves drew more than 12,000 fans to Finley Stadium, and the club reported that more than 70,000 people attended its home matches over the course of the season. On July 4, 2026, a club-record regular-season crowd of 6,107 watched a 1–0 win over Inter Miami CF II, the largest attendance in MLS Next Pro that regular season. The women's team set its own club record that season, with 1,982 attending a 1–0 win over 865 Alliance in June. The 2026 MLS Next Pro Cup final on November 8 drew a record Cup crowd of 10,228 to Finley Stadium.

== Rivalries ==
For the 2014 season with 3 Tennessee clubs in the NPSL, the Chattahooligans, working with Nashville FC's main supporters group, developed a rivalry trophy between Chattanooga FC, Nashville FC, and Knoxville Force called the "Volunteer Shield". Memphis City FC was added to the trophy upon its joining the NPSL in 2016. The Volunteer Shield is presented at the end of each season to the supporters of the club that takes the most points in games against one another, with a medallion added to the trophy commemorating the season.

Chattanooga FC has won the Volunteer Shield 4 times in the last 5 years: 2014, with a record of 4–1–0 against Nashville and Knoxville, 2015 with the same 4–1–0 record, 2016 with a 6–0–1 record, including against Memphis City FC, and 2018 with a perfect 4–0–0 record against Knoxville and Inter Nashville FC.

Starting in 2017, Chattanooga FC will compete with Asheville City SC for the "Blue Ridge Derby".

Volunteer Shield
Chattanooga FC	Knoxville Force	Inter Nashville FC	Memphis City FC	Nashville FC
5 (2014–16, 2018–19)	1 (2017)	0	0	0

In the spring of 2023, despite being in different leagues, One Knoxville SC travelled to Chattanooga for an exhibition match at Finley Stadium. The match was deemed the "Tennessee River Showdown." As of April 2023, it has yet to be announced if this will be a recurring rivalry, but it would only be natural for these teams to face one another more than once.

Chattanooga FC also has a cross-city rivalry with Chattanooga Red Wolves SC. They played their first match against each other on 2 April 2025 in a U.S. Open Cup tie at Finley Stadium, with the Red Wolves winning on penalties after a 1–1 draw. After the match, both teams scuffled after Red Wolves players tried planting a flag at midfield. The game had an attendance of 12,131, the fourth-highest attended game in Chattanooga FC's history and the second-highest for a second round match in U.S. Open Cup history.

== Players and staff ==
=== Current roster ===
As of November 8, 2026

No.	Pos.	Nation	Player
1	GK	SUI	Eldin Jakupović
2	DF	CAN	Yves Tcheuyap
3	DF	USA	Tate Robertson
4	DF	USA	Mattias Hanchard
5	DF	ARG	Farid Sar-Sar
6	MF	HAI	Steeve Louis-Jean
7	FW	USA	Anthony García
9	MF	GRN	Damien Barker John
10	MF	USA	Daniel Mangarov
11	MF	ALG	Ameziane Sid Mohand
12	DF	TOG	Edoh Koffi
13	DF	USA	Anthony Sorenson
14	DF	USA	Nathan Koehler
17	MF	HON	Darwin Ortiz
18	MF	USA	Luke Husakiwsky
19	FW	JAM	Ashton Gordon (on loan from Atlanta United FC)
20	MF	GHA	Kenneth Tsokli
21	MF	GHA	Francis Amoateng
23	FW	USA	Alex Krehl
26	FW	USA	Keegan Ancelin
29	FW	ARG	Alexis Arrúa
30	MF	USA	Colin Thomas
33	MF	ENG	Alex McGrath
38	DF	ARG	Junior Flores
47	MF	USA	Isaiah Jones (on loan from Nashville SC)
51	GK	USA	Michael Barrueta
77	GK	USA	Griffin Huff
90	FW	USA	Yuval Cohen

Chattanooga FC Academy player.

=== Technical staff ===
As of November 8, 2026

Technical staff
Head Coach	Richard Dixon
Chief Sporting Officer	Sebastian Giraldo
Assistant Coach	Liam Davies
Assistant Coach	Miguel Rodrigues
Assistant and Goalkeeper Coach	Chris Barocas
Director of Soccer Operations	Melissa Dallenbach
Women's Team
Head Coach	Majo Harispuru
Assistant Coach	Micah Varner
Assistant Coach	Emanuele Cocuzza
Goalkeeping Coach	JD Myers
Individual Development Coach	Maryn Beutler
Team Operations Manager	Ashleigh Renko

=== Notable former players ===
- (Spain) Juan Hernandez
- (United States) Mark Sherrod
- (Republic of Ireland) Niall McCabe
- (Jamaica) Sean McFarlane
- (United States) Thomas Hunter
- (England) Greg Hartley

== Year-by-year ==
Season	Tier	League	Conf./Split	Pos.	Pl.	W	D	L	GF	GA	Pts.	PPG	Playoffs	U.S. Open Cup	Top goalscorer		Manager
Season	Tier	League	Conf./Split	Pos.	Pl.	W	D	L	GF	GA	Pts.	PPG	Playoffs	U.S. Open Cup	Name	League	Manager
2009	"4"	NPSL	Southeast	3rd	8	4	1	3	11	10	13	1.63	Did not qualify	Ineligible	(United States) Omar Cooke	4	(United States) Brian Crossman
2010	"4"	NPSL	Southeast	1st	8	6	2	0	19	5	20	2.5	National Final	Did not qualify	(Kenya) Chris Ochieng	6	(United States) Brian Crossman
2011	"4"	NPSL	Southeast	3rd	10	5	2	3	15	10	17	1.7	Did not qualify	First round	(Kenya) Chris Ochieng	6	(United States) Brian Crossman
2012	"4"	NPSL	Southeast, West	1st	10	6	3	1	23	8	21	2.1	National Final	Did not qualify	(England) Luke Winter	9	(United States) Bill Elliott
2013	"4"	NPSL	Southeast	1st	10	6	3	1	18	4	21	2.1	Regional Final	First round	(Brazil) Zeca Ferraz (England) Luke Winter	4	(United States) Bill Elliott
2014	"4"	NPSL	Southeast	1st	12	9	2	1	31	8	29	2.42	National Final	Third round	(Republic of Ireland) Niall McCabe	5	(United States) Bill Elliott
2015	"4"	NPSL	Southeast	1st	10	8	1	1	28	6	25	2.5	National Final	Third round	(England) Luke Winter	8	(United States) Bill Elliott
2016	"4"	NPSL	Southeast	1st	10	9	1	0	21	3	28	2.8	National semifinals	Third round	(Spain) Samuel Goñi (Wales) Will Roberts (England) Luke Winter	3	(United States) Bill Elliott
2017	"4"	NPSL	Southeast, West	2nd	12	6	4	2	28	7	22	1.83	Conf. Quarterfinals	First round	(Brazil) Felipe Antonio	6	(United States) Bill Elliott
2018	"4"	NPSL	Southeast	1st	14	8	4	2	30	16	28	2.0	Conf. Final	Did not qualify	(Brazil) Felipe Oliveira	7	(United States) Bill Elliott
2019	"4"	NPSL	Southeast	1st	10	7	1	2	29	11	22	2.2	Regional semifinals	Declined spot	(Brazil) Felipe Oliveira	5	(United States) Bill Elliott
2019–20	3	NISA	Fall	Did not participate										Cancelled	(United States) Ian McGrath	1	(United States) Peter Fuller
2019–20	3	NISA	Spring (Note: Spring season cancelled before completion)	6th	1	0	1	0	1	1	1	1.0		Cancelled	(United States) Ian McGrath	1	(United States) Peter Fuller
2020–21	3	NISA	Fall, Eastern	1st	4	3	0	1	8	3	9	2.25	Semifinals	Cancelled	(Brazil) Zeca Ferraz (United States) Ian McGrath	3	(United States) Peter Fuller
2020–21	3	NISA	Spring	6th	8	2	2	4	6	8	8	1.0	Semifinals	Cancelled	(Brazil) Zeca Ferraz (United States) Ian McGrath	3	(United States) Peter Fuller
Fall 2021	3	NISA	N/A	5th	18	7	2	9	20	21	23	1.28	N/A	Cancelled	(United States) Brett Jones (Norway) Markus Naglestad	4	(United States) Peter Fuller
2022	3	NISA	East Division (Note: The East and West divisions were condenced into a single table following two teams suspending operations)	2nd	24	14	7	3	44	21	49	2.04	Semifinals	Third round	(Norway) Markus Naglestad	19	(United States) Rod Underwood
2023	3	NISA	N/A	1st	24	15	7	2	41	12	52	2.17	Semifinals	Third round	(Norway) Markus Naglestad	15	(United States) Rod Underwood
2024	3	MLSNP	Eastern Conference	9th	28	9	10	9	45	42	45	1.61	DNQ	First Round	(Algeria) Mehdi Ouamri	12	(United States) Rod Underwood
2025	3	MLSNP	Eastern Conference	4th	28	13	9	6	42	36	53	1.89	Conference Quarterfinals	Second Round	(United States) Tate Robertson	9	(England) Chris Nugent
2026	3	MLSNP	Eastern Conference	2nd	28	15	7	6	56	39	56	2.0	Champions	Round of 32	(United States) Alex Krehl	18	(Jamaica) Richard Dixon
Total					277	152	69	56	516	271	542	1.96	–	–	(Norway) Markus Naglestad	41	–

== Honors ==
=== Domestic ===
MLS Next Pro

- League
  - Champions (Playoffs): 2026
- MLS Next Pro Eastern Conference
  - Champions (Playoffs): 2026

National Independent Soccer Association

- NISA Independent Cup
  - Southeast Region:
    - Champion (2): 2020, 2021, 2022, 2023
- NISA Leagues Cup (Regular season champion)
  - Champion (1): 2023
- NISA Legends Cup
  - Runners-up (1): 2021

National Premier Soccer League

- National
  - Runners-up (4): 2010, 2012, 2014, 2015
- South Region:
  - Champions (3): 2014, 2015, 2016
    - Runners Up (1): 2013
- Southeast Conference:
  - Champions (8): 2010, 2012, 2013, 2014, 2015, 2016, 2018, 2019

United States Adult Soccer Association

- U.S. Soccer National Amateur Championship:
  - Hank Steinbrecher Cup
    - Champions (1): 2015
      - Runners Up (1): 2016

== Head coaches ==
- (United States) Brian Crossman (2009–2011)
- (United States) Bill Elliott (2012–2019)
- (United States) Peter Fuller (2019–2021)
- (United States) Rod Underwood (2022–2024)
- (England) Chris Nugent (2024–2026)
- (Jamaica) Richard Dixon (2026–present)

== Stadium ==
- Finley Stadium; Chattanooga, Tennessee (2009–present)

== See also ==
- NPSL Founders Cup
