= SOMO Village =

Coordinates: 38°19′17″N 122°40′39″W

SOMO Village Logo

SOMO Village is a mixed-use redevelopment of a former Agilent campus in Rohnert Park, California (40 miles (64 km) north of San Francisco). SOMO Village spans 200 acres in the foothills of Sonoma Mountain in Rohnert Park, California.

The mixed-use development aims to cultivate a community by fostering a healthy and sustainable way of life. It offers individuals and families 1750 residential units ranging from single-family homes to cottages, condos and apartments.

SOMO Village also features 600,000 square foot business hub with a wellness-focused coworking space (SOMO Cowork). Complementing this community is an array of amenities, including a community garden, concert and event venue, public art, Waldorf-inspired high school, and more. Future planned amenities include a fitness center with functional training, hot yoga and recovery area, coffee shop, day care, brewery, and more.

Selected as the first One Planet Living Community in North America, SOMO Village has adopted the ten-principle framework covering social, environmental, and economic sustainability aspects. The project is certified by the U.S. Green Building Council's Leadership in Energy and Environmental Design for Neighborhood Development (LEED-ND) and the development has also received the Governor’s Environmental and Economic Leadership Award (GEELA).

== Project by numbers ==
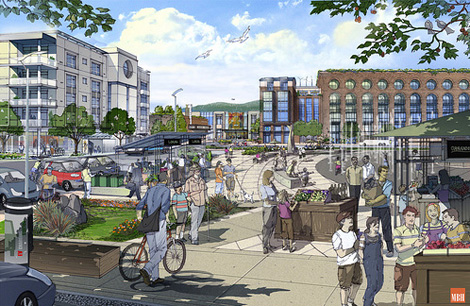
Artist's rendition of Sonoma Mountain Village

Plans call for SOMO Village to be built over the next 12 years.

- 1750 Total Residential Units Incl.254 affordable housing units
- 25 Acres Headwaters Farm and Garden
- 12000 Sq. ft dedicated for Fitness and Childcare Centers
- 38.54 Acres of parks and open space
- 600000 Sq. ft. of commercial and retail space Incl. 24,000sf of coworking space (SOMO Cowork)
- 4000 New residents

SOMO Village home construction is planned to start in Q4 2023.

== Existing amenities ==
- Credo High School
- Public Art
- Event Center
- Concert Venue
- Coworking space (SOMO Cowork)

== Forthcoming amenities ==
- Brewery (Old Caz)
- Fitness Center (KÖMPLEX FIT STUDIO)
- Day Care (Sai's Sprouts Preschool)

== See also ==
- Zero waste
- Credo High School
