= Sonoma State University (census-designated place) =

Sonoma State University CDP
- Census-designated place
- Location within California Location within the United States
- Coordinates: 38°20′26″N 122°40′22″W
- Country: United States
- State: California
- County: Sonoma

Area
  - Total: 0.417 sq mi (1.08 km^{2})
  - Land: 0.417 sq mi (1.08 km^{2})
  - Water: 0 sq mi (0 km^{2})
- Elevation: 157 ft (48 m)

Population (2020)
  - Total: 2,679
  - Density: 6,420/sq mi (2,480/km^{2})
- Time zone: UTC-8 (Pacific)
  - Summer (DST): UTC-7 (PDT)
- GNIS feature ID: 2805261

The United States Census Bureau has designated the Sonoma State University campus as a separate census-designated place (CDP) for statistical purposes. It first appeared as a CDP in the 2020 U.S. census with a population of 2,679.

Historical population
Census	Pop.	Note	%±
2020	2,679		—
U.S. Decennial Census; 2020

== 2020 census ==
Sonoma State University CDP, California – Racial and ethnic composition Note: the US Census treats Hispanic/Latino as an ethnic category. This table excludes Latinos from the racial categories and assigns them to a separate category. Hispanics/Latinos may be of any race.
Race / Ethnicity (NH = Non-Hispanic)	Pop 2020	% 2020
White alone (NH)	362	13.51%
Black or African American alone (NH)	106	3.96%
Native American or Alaska Native alone (NH)	1	0.04%
Asian alone (NH)	1,414	52.78%
Pacific Islander alone (NH)	0	0.00%
Other Race alone (NH)	70	2.61%
Mixed Race or Multi-Racial (NH)	34	1.27%
Hispanic or Latino (any race)	692	25.83%
Total	2,679	100.00%

== Education ==
The school district in which the CDP resides is the Cotati-Rohnert Park Unified School District.
