= Technology High School =

Several high schools use the name Technology High School:

- Technology High School (Rohnert Park, California)
- New Technology High School, Napa, California
- Technology High School (New Jersey)
- Technology High School (Omaha, Nebraska)
- Information Technology High School (Pembroke, NC)
- New Technology High School, Sacramento, California
