= Rohnert Park, California =

City in California, United States

- City
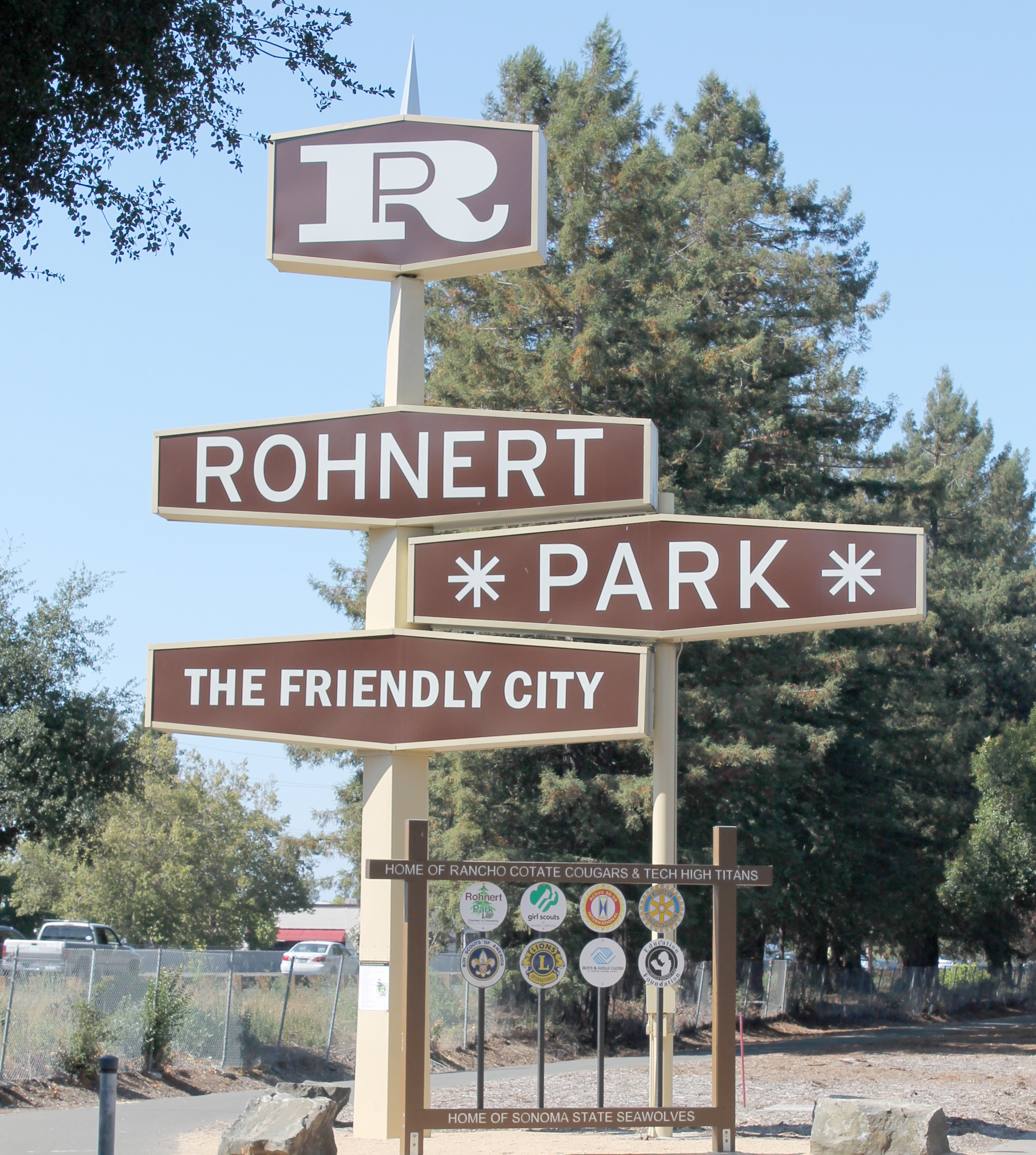
- Rohnert Park sign between Commerce Boulevard and U.S. 101

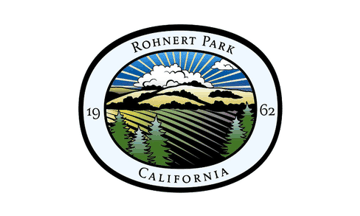
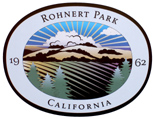
- Flag Logo
- Motto: "The Friendly City"
- Interactive map of Rohnert Park, California
- Location in the United States
- Coordinates: 38°20′50″N 122°41′43″W
- Country: United States
- State: California
- County: Sonoma
- Incorporated: August 28, 1962
- Named for: Rohnert family

Government
  - Type: Council–manager
  - Mayor: Emily Sanborn
  - Vice Mayor: Jackie Elward
  - City Manager: Marcela Piedra

Area
  - Total: 7.29 sq mi (18.88 km^{2})
  - Land: 7.29 sq mi (18.87 km^{2})
  - Water: 0.0039 sq mi (0.01 km^{2}) 0.07%
- Elevation: 105 ft (32 m)

Population (2020)
  - Total: 44,390
  - Density: 6,093/sq mi (2,352.4/km^{2})
- Time zone: UTC−8 (Pacific)
  - Summer (DST): UTC−7 (PDT)
- ZIP codes: 94926–94928
- Area code: 707, 369
- FIPS code: 06-62546
- GNIS feature IDs: 1656263, 2410985
- Website: www.rpcity.org

Rohnert Park is a city in Sonoma County, California, United States, located approximately 50 miles (80 km) north of San Francisco. The population at the 2020 United States census was 44,390. It is an early planned city and is the sister city of Hashimoto in Japan. Sonoma State University, part of the California State University system, is located nearby.

== History ==
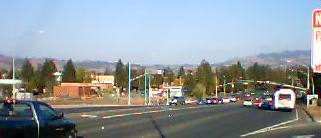
Rohnert Park Expressway

Originally home of the Coast Miwok native people, the Mexican government granted Rancho Cotate to Captain Juan Castaneda in July 1844 for his military services in the region. The grant encompassed present-day Penngrove, Cotati and Rohnert Park. "Cotate Rancho is a part of the Vallejo Township which is the plain between Sonoma Mountain and Petaluma Creek San Pablo Bay, and an east and west line dividing the tract from Santa Rosa Township." In 1849, Dr. Thomas S. Page, of Cotati, bought Rancho Cotate. Over time, the property was broken up and sold off piecemeal to incoming settlers.

The town of Rohnert Park was named after the Rohnert family, which owned the Rohnert Seed Farm. In 1929, a successful businessman, Waldo Emerson Rohnert (1869–1933), a native of Detroit, Michigan, purchased a large ranch in the area and minimized flooding in the fields with a crude drainage system. He died shortly thereafter. His son, Fred Rohnert, a graduate of Stanford Law School, took over the ranch and developed a seed growing business, the Rohnert Seed Farm, which became a major horticultural success for the county.

In 1956, only four adults resided within the district boundaries. In 1956 and 1957, with the U.S. Route 101 Freeway recently completed at the Cotati bypass, Rohnert Park began to be laid out and built as a planned city. In a summer election in 1962, Rohnert Park was incorporated, comprising 1,325 acres (5.36 km^{2}), housing an estimated 2,775 persons. It was the first town to incorporate in Sonoma County since 1905. The neighboring town of Cotati, California, voted to incorporate the following year.

=== 21st-century development ===
Sonoma Mountain Village Rohnert Park is a 200-acre (0.81 km^{2}), solar-powered, zero-waste community currently under development.

The nearby Graton Resort & Casino, outside the city limit, opened on November 5, 2013.

== Geography ==
According to the United States Census Bureau, Rohnert Park has a total area of 7.3 square miles (19 km^{2}), 99.93% of it land and 0.07% of it water.

The city neighborhoods east of Highway 101 are organized into sections, generally designated by the letters A–H, J-M, R, S, and W. In most cases, the names of streets and parks begin with the letter of the section they are in. K Section is also referred to as the "University District" and is the residential development of the city's University Specific Plan Area; W Section is also referred to as "Willowglen" and is the residential development of the city's Southeast Specific Plan Area.

There is a small reservoir called Roberts Lake at the north end of the city and a number of creeks. Important creeks include the Laguna de Santa Rosa (which forms part of the border with the City of Cotati), Copeland Creek, Hinebaugh Creek, Crane Creek and Five Creek. All creeks within the city limits have been channelized. Spivock Creek, Coleman Creek, Wilfred Channel, and Labath Channel are artificial channels designed to convey runoff.

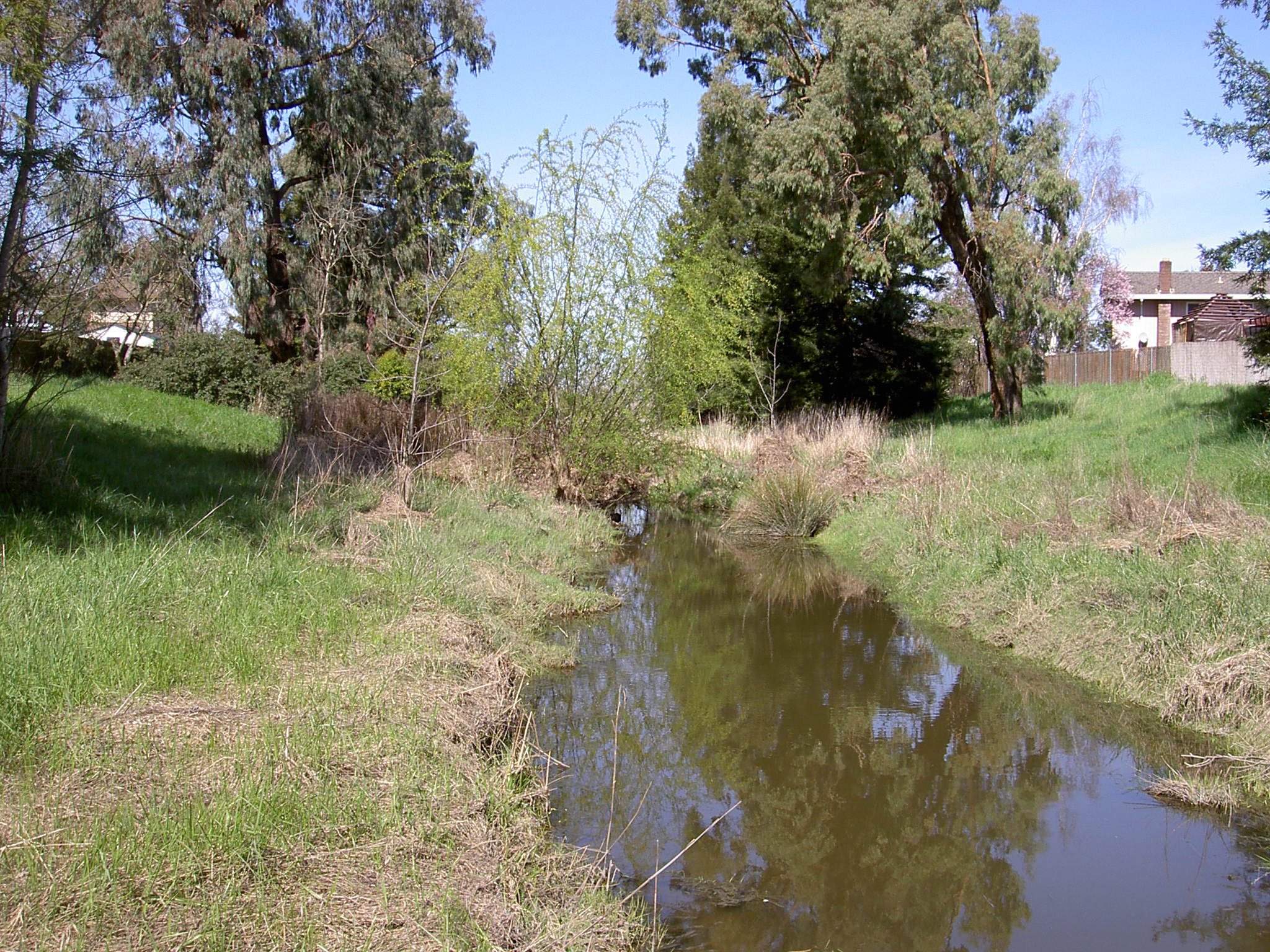
Five Creek

Riparian communities within the city are limited by channelization of creekbeds. Vegetation alongside the city's streams primarily consists of grass and sedge species. The Laguna de Santa Rosa contains bands of thick native riparian vegetation, including willow (Salix spp.) and alder (Alnus spp.) trees.

Sudden oak death fungus risks are present in the Rohnert Park area. Research is ongoing at the nearby Fairfield Osborn Preserve.

=== Geology ===
The Rodgers Creek Fault is an active fault influencing earthquake activity in the Rohnert Park area. The city also experiences earthquakes from the San Andreas Fault.

== Demographics ==
Historical population
Census	Pop.	Note	%±
1970	6,133		—
1980	22,965		274.4%
1990	36,326		58.2%
2000	42,236		16.3%
2010	40,971		−3.0%
2020	44,390		8.3%
U.S. Decennial Census; 1860–1870 1880-1890; 1900 1910 1920; 1930 1940 1950; 1960 1970 1980; 1990 2000 2010; 2020

=== 2020 census ===
As of the 2020 census, Rohnert Park had a population of 44,390 and a population density of 6,092.5 inhabitants per square mile (2,352.3/km^{2}). The median age was 36.3 years. The census reported that 100.0% of residents lived in urban areas, while 0.0% lived in rural areas.

Racial composition as of the 2020 census
Race	Number	Percent
White	26,296	59.2%
Black or African American	977	2.2%
American Indian and Alaska Native	712	1.6%
Asian	2,833	6.4%
Native Hawaiian and Other Pacific Islander	175	0.4%
Some other race	6,903	15.6%
Two or more races	6,494	14.6%
Hispanic or Latino (of any race)	13,131	29.6%

The census reported that 99.2% of the population lived in households, 0.8% lived in non-institutionalized group quarters, and 0.0% were institutionalized. There were 16,827 households, of which 30.1% had children under the age of 18 living in them. Of all households, 43.1% were married-couple households, 9.1% were cohabiting-couple households, 18.7% were households with a male householder and no spouse or partner present, and 29.1% were households with a female householder and no spouse or partner present. About 25.0% of households were made up of individuals, and 11.4% had someone living alone who was 65 years of age or older. The average household size was 2.62, and there were 10,537 families (62.6% of all households).

The age distribution was 19.7% under the age of 18, 12.1% aged 18 to 24, 29.5% aged 25 to 44, 24.0% aged 45 to 64, and 14.7% aged 65 or older. For every 100 females, there were 94.2 males, and for every 100 females age 18 and over there were 92.6 males age 18 and over.

There were 17,768 housing units at an average density of 2,438.6 units per square mile (941.5 units/km^{2}). Of all housing units, 94.7% were occupied and 5.3% were vacant; 53.5% of occupied units were owner-occupied and 46.5% were occupied by renters. The homeowner vacancy rate was 0.8% and the rental vacancy rate was 7.0%.

=== 2023 ACS 5-year estimates ===
In 2023, the US Census Bureau estimated that 15.5% of the population were foreign-born. Of all people aged 5 or older, 72.0% spoke only English at home, 20.0% spoke Spanish, 3.0% spoke other Indo-European languages, 4.5% spoke Asian or Pacific Islander languages, and 0.5% spoke other languages. Of those aged 25 or older, 89.9% were high school graduates and 30.1% had a bachelor's degree.

The median household income in 2023 was $96,635, and the per capita income was $45,603. About 6.4% of families and 10.2% of the population were below the poverty line.

=== 2010 census ===
At the 2010 census Rohnert Park had a population of 40,971. The population density was 5,846.8 inhabitants per square mile (2,257.5/km^{2}). The racial makeup of Rohnert Park was 31,178 (76.1%) White, 759 (1.9%) African American, 407 (1.0%) Native American, 2,144 (5.2%) Asian, 179 (0.4%) Pacific Islander, 3,967 (9.7%) from other races, and 2,337 (5.7%) from two or more races. Hispanic or Latino of any race were 9,068 persons (22.1%).

The census reported that 99.0% of the population lived in households and 1.0% lived in non-institutionalized group quarters.

There were 15,808 households, 4,842 (30.6%) had children under the age of 18 living in them, 6,546 (41.4%) were opposite-sex married couples living together, 1,883 (11.9%) had a female householder with no husband present, 907 (5.7%) had a male householder with no wife present. There were 1,201 (7.6%) unmarried opposite-sex partnerships, and 144 (0.9%) same-sex married couples or partnerships. 4,177 households (26.4%) were one person and 1,374 (8.7%) had someone living alone who was 65 or older. The average household size was 2.57. There were 9,336 families (59.1% of households); the average family size was 3.13.

The age distribution was 8,571 people (20.9%) under the age of 18, 6,853 people (16.7%) aged 18 to 24, 11,035 people (26.9%) aged 25 to 44, 10,710 people (26.1%) aged 45 to 64, and 3,802 people (9.3%) who were 65 or older. The median age was 33.0 years. For every 100 females, there were 95.3 males. For every 100 females age 18 and over, there were 92.7 males.

There were 16,551 housing units at an average density of 2,361.9 units per square mile (911.9 units/km^{2}), of which 54.0% were owner-occupied and 46.0% were occupied by renters. The homeowner vacancy rate was 2.1%; the rental vacancy rate was 4.8%. 55.8% of the population lived in owner-occupied housing units and 43.3% lived in rental housing units.

== Law and government ==
=== Council ===
Rohnert Park is governed by a City Council of five members, who serve staggered four-year terms. Municipal elections are held in November of even-numbered years. In 2019, the Rohnert Park City Council voted to transition from at-large elections to a district based system in which voters elect one councilmember to represent each district. Any registered voter who resides within Rohnert Park is eligible to run for City Council in the district in which they live.

=== County, state, and federal representation ===
Rohnert Park is split between Sonoma County's 2nd and 3rd supervisorial districts.

In the California State Legislature, Rohnert Park is in the 3rd senatorial district, represented by Democrat Christopher Cabaldon, and in the 12th Assembly District represented by Democrat Damon Connolly.

In the United States House of Representatives, Rohnert Park is part of California's 4th congressional district, represented by Democrat Mike Thompson.

According to the California Secretary of State, as of February 10, 2019, Rohnert Park has 22,583 registered voters. Of those, 11,010 (48.8%) are registered Democrats, 4,051 (17.9%) are registered Republicans, and 6,234 (27.6%) have declined to state a political party.

=== Department of Public Safety ===
Rohnert Park is patrolled by the Rohnert Park Department of Public Safety, established in 1962, that operates as an integrated fire and police department. This is one of only two cities operating Departments of Public Safety in California.

==== Shooting of Kuanchung Kao ====
On April 29, 1997, Kuanchung Kao was waving a wooden stick in the street in front of his driveway. When some neighbors called 911, two officers, Jack Shields and Mike Lynch, responded. Shields shot Kao once in the chest. Shields stated that he believed Kao was waving the stick in a martial arts fashion, and that he and Lynch had to respond by using deadly force. The incident was investigated by the Sonoma County Sheriff's Office, the Sonoma County District Attorney's Office, and FBI, who all cleared Shields. Kao's family and attorney John Burris filed a lawsuit against the city of Rohnert Park, and received a settlement of $1 million in 2001.

==== Other Police Controversies ====
On July 29, 2015, Rohnert Park Public Safety Officer Dave Rodriguez drew his sidearm during an encounter with city resident, while the resident was hitching his boat trailer to his vehicle. The resident recorded the incident and posted it on YouTube. Rodriguez was placed on administrative leave while the city conducted an internal investigation into the incident. In August 2015, the city engaged an independent investigator, who found that Rodriguez's actions were within the law and followed department policy. A civil rights claim filed on behalf of the resident asserted that Rodriguez was trying to intimidate him. The lawsuit concluded in a settlement.

On November 16, 2018, a civil rights lawsuit was filed against Rohnert Park alleging that Rohnert Park police "conspired to expand the legitimate interdiction mission to one of personal financial gain, and over the years seized thousands of pounds of cannabis and hundreds of thousands of dollars of currency without issuing receipts for the seizures, without making arrests for any crimes, and without any official report of the forfeitures being made". KQED published an investigation in June 2018, quoting complaints by other motorists saying they were "robbed" by the Rohnert Park police, including the officers named in the lawsuit. The police department has since ceased most of its seizure efforts.

In 2020, the city agreed to a $2 Million settlement with the family of Branch Wroth, who died in police custody in 2017, after a $4 Million judgment was vacated on appeal.

== Transportation ==
Rohnert Park is served by a station on the Sonoma–Marin Area Rail Transit commuter rail line since it became operational on August 25, 2017. Sonoma County Airport Express buses connect Rohnert Park with Oakland International Airport and San Francisco International Airport.

== Education ==
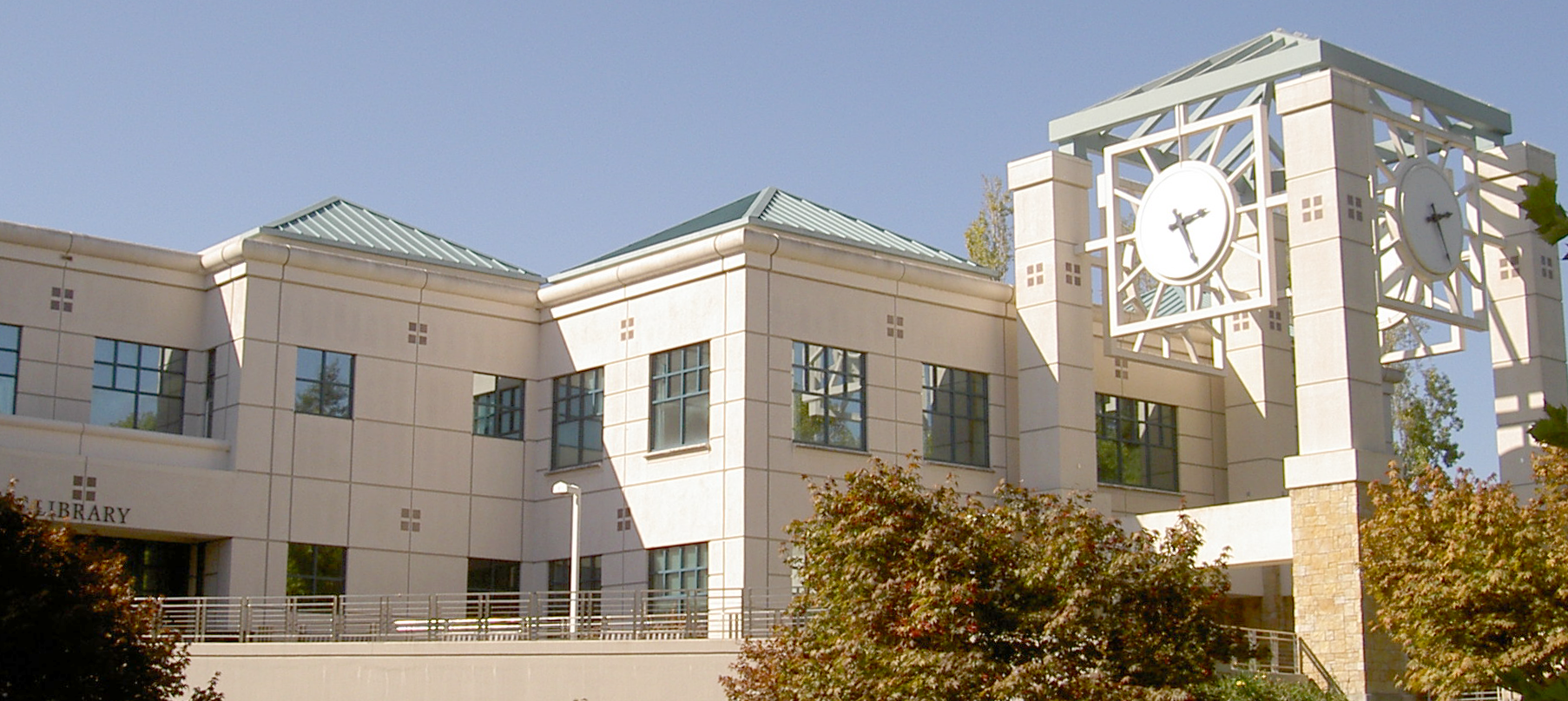
Sonoma State University campus

Rohnert Park is home to Sonoma State University, part of the California State University system.

The Cotati-Rohnert Park Unified School District serves the city.

=== High schools ===
Rancho Cotate High School is the main comprehensive high school for both Rohnert Park and Cotati.

Alternative education consists of:

- Credo High School, a charter public high school
- Flex Academy (on RCHS campus)
- Technology High School, a small public high school
- Phoenix High School (on RCHS campus)
- Independent study

== See also ==
- Film locations in Sonoma County, California
- List of cities and towns in California
- List of cities and towns in the San Francisco Bay Area
