= Technology High School (Rohnert Park, California) =

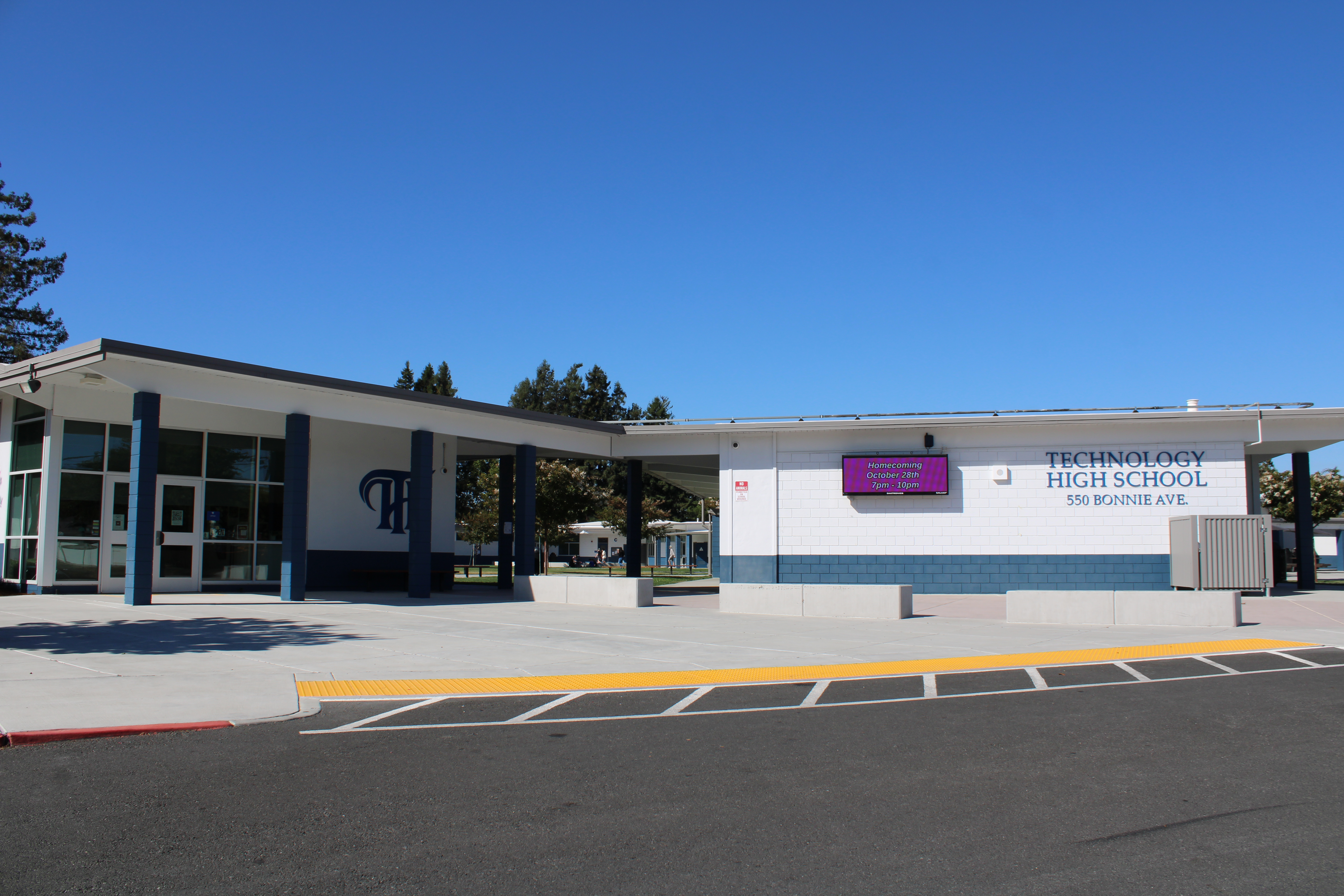

Location
- 550 Bonnie Avenue; Rohnert Park, California 94928-3613; United States; 38°20′02″N 122°42′00″W

Information
- School type: Public, Magnet
- Founded: 1999
- School district: Cotati-Rohnert Park Unified
- Superintendent: Maité Iturri (2023-2026)
- School code: 49-73882-4930384
- Principal: Jessica Romero
- Teaching staff: 16.13 (FTE)
- Grades: 9–12
- Gender: Coed
- Enrollment: 338 (2023–2024)
- International students: 2
- Average class size: 37
- Student to teacher ratio: 20.95
- Language: English
- Schedule: 7:30 AM–3:40 PM Mon., Thurs., Friday. 7:30 AM–3:35 PM Tues. 7:30 AM–2:40 PM Wed.
- Classrooms: 12
- Campuses: 1
- Area: over 15,000 square feet (1,400 m^{2})
- Colors: Blue, White.
- Sports: Basketball, Soccer, Golf, Tennis, Robotics, Swimming, Track, Cross Country, Baseball, Volleyball, Dance
- Mascot: Titan
- Team name: Titans
- National ranking: 215
- Feeder schools: Technology Middle School, Lawrence Jones Middle School
- Website: https://ths.crpusd.org

Technology High School is a magnet school with a focus in science, math and technology, located in Sonoma County, California. It was founded in 1995 under the Cotati-Rohnert Park Unified School District on the Sonoma State University campus. It was sponsored by Hewlett-Packard and the Autodesk foundation. The school opened its doors in 1999.

== History ==
=== Technology High School as a program ===
Initially the school was a program of Rancho Cotate High School. The students involved in the program would split their time between the two schools. Technology High School's program included Integrated Science, Engineering, and Math curriculum as required courses. The students took the remainder of their classes from Rancho Cotate High School. This environment created a school focused heavily on the math and sciences with Rancho Cotate High School providing everything else expected from a traditional high school.

=== Technology High School as a school ===
In 2002, Tech High became a separate and independent school, starting with the class of 2006. The former "program students" continued to be part-time students, and split their time, while all new students came in as full-time. This called for new, undeveloped humanities, physical education, foreign language, and elective programs to be created and implemented. These have since become more developed.

The mascot of the school, the Titan, was chosen by the students. Their rationale for picking this mascot for the school was because they believed they would become "Titans of Industry". The visual representation of the school's mascot was later distorted, and since 2022 official graphics of the school mascot depict a knight.

=== Relations with the District ===
Relations with the school district became strained when during the planning of the 2004-2005 district budget, a proposal was put forth to relocate Technology High School. This caused a strong backlash of support from the community around Technology High School. Students, parents, and staff felt that this would severely compromise the integrity of the program. Students and parents pulled together in an attempt to halt this measure. In a special session in January 2004 the school board voted 5–0 to keep the school in its facilities on the Sonoma State University campus.

Relations with the school district have improved considerably, partly due to Technology High School being announced as a Distinguished School in April 2005 as part of California's Distinguished School Program. Relations have also been improved due to Technology High School's high testing scores. The district has now publicly stated that they feel that the proposal to relocate Technology High School was a mistake.

=== Recent history ===
- In 2005, Technology High School began its first year of an extended waiting list. A random selection process was used to follow California's fair and equitable education guidelines. The 2005–2006 school year will also be the first year that Technology High School will house 4 years of full-time students. Its first full-time class graduated in June 2006.
- Technology High School was officially declared a California Distinguished High School, due in part to the quality of the students' work, the high grade average, and the outstanding STAR testing score, which was indexed at 823 API.
- Dr. Kay Dorner announced her resignation in April 2007 to accept a principalship in Southern Oregon.
- On May 8, 2007, the Board of Trustees of the Cotati-Rohnert Park Unified School District appointed Mr. Anthony Harris as the new principal at Technology High School. Mr. Harris' appointment became effective July 1, 2007.
- Dr. Bruce Mims became the principal in 2011, he was recruited by the superintendent of the Cotati-Rohnert Park Unified School District. He resigned in October 2013 amidst a controversy and revelation of his falsely portraying himself to have been a Navy SEAL for decades. Coincidentally during his tenure enrollment grew approximately 33% and the school's state Academic Performance Index Score rose to 920 — the highest in Sonoma County, however the APIS had been steadily rising prior to his arrival. APIS is most readily attributed to the quality of teaching faculty.
- As of the 2016-2017 School year, Technology High acquired a new principal, Ms. Dawn Mawhinney.
- In 2019, the District remodeled a former elementary school site (Waldo Rohnert Elementary) to become the new home for Technology High School.
- Technology High School opened at the new location for the 2019-20 school year.
- As of August 2021, Technology High acquired a new principal, Ms. Michelle Devereaux (Previously known as Ms. Michelle Spencer).
- In November 2021, Technology High earned the National Blue-Ribbon Award.

== Campus ==
=== Location ===
The old lobby of Tech High School in Salazar Building

Technology High School first occupied the Green Valley building complex, in the northwest corner of the Sonoma State University campus in Rohnert Park, California, from the 1999-2000 academic year through the end of the 2001-2002 academic year.

In 2002, the school moved to the northeast corner of the Ruben Salazar Building on the Sonoma State University campus. The Salazar Building is near the center of campus, south of the quad. This location facilitated continued access to Rancho Cotate High School, which allowed Technology High School students to participate in Rancho Cotate High School Physical Education classes.

On April 13, 2018, the Cotati-Rohnert Park Unified School District approved the move of Technology High School to a former elementary school site (Waldo Rohnert Elementary School) within Rohnert Park. Relocation began in 2019.

== Student body ==
=== Ethnicities ===
(For the 2022–2023 school year)

60.5%	White
17.6%	Hispanic or Latino
8.2%	Asian
7.3%	Two or more races
1.2%	Filipino
1.8%	African American
0.00%	Pacific Islander
0.6%	American Indian/Alaska Native
2.7%	none reported

=== Other data ===
There are 1.4 students per computer, compared to the California statewide average of 5 students per computer. Many students go on to a higher educational institution while less than 20% go directly into the workforce.

== Faculty ==
There is an average of 23 students per teacher. Full credentials are possessed by all of the teachers. Furthermore, 94% of faculty has 3 years or more experience teaching. Faculty retention has been an issue over the school's history. Retention rates were below 50% during the first several years of operation but current retention rates hover around 75%.

Due to the small-school environment that Technology High School maintains there are at most 3 teachers in one department. This encourages teachers to work together on cross-curricular projects. Staff meetings happen at least once a week where the entire staff of the school gathers together to discuss any outstanding school wide issues. Another purpose of these meetings is to attempt to ensure consistency through the entire school.

== Curriculum ==
Technology High School's curriculum is designed to be project-based as well as cross-curricular. Teachers work closely together to create projects that span more than one curricular area. Teachers also try to time the curriculum so that students can take advantage of what they learn in one class in another. The curriculum is also designed and graded based on the Schoolwide Learning Outcomes.

== Robotics Team ==
Technology High School has a robotics team that currently competes in 1b (antweight) and 15lb (dogeweight) classes of combat robotics. In the 3D-printed plastic antweight division, beginner students are taught how to build a combat robot, the basics of electronics, and how to use computer-aided design software and 3D printers. More experienced students often join one of the dogeweight teams, which involve significantly larger, more complicated, and more costly bots. The team generally competes in both weight classes at Sacramento Bot Battles. In April 2025, one member's plastic antweight bot scored first place in the competition, while the dogeweight bots scored 2nd and 4th in their bracket. In May 2025, the dogeweight bots competed in the NRL Nationals in Springfield, Ohio, achieving fourth place in one case. The team has been sponsored by Designit Prototype, the Porsche Club of America, the Rohnert Park Foundation, and NECA.

== Awards ==
Tech High was named a California Distinguished School in 2005, 2009, and again in 2013. Tech High also earned the National Blue-Ribbon Award in 2021.
