= Film locations in Sonoma County, California =

Film locations in Sonoma County, California are a diverse set of sites throughout this California county, where all or parts of notable motion pictures have been produced. Due to the scenic and varied aspects of Sonoma County, a large number of films have been made within this County. Some of the earliest U.S. filmmaking occurred in Sonoma County such as the 1914 production 1914 Salomy Jane and Bronco Billy Anderson produced in 1915. Many of these films are classics in American cinematography such as the 1947 film The Farmer's Daughter, starring Joseph Cotten and Loretta Young, and Alfred Hitchcock's The Birds produced in 1963, which was also partially filmed in adjacent Marin County. Many other more modern classics have used Sonoma County as a filming venue, including the 1990 production of the Flatliners and the 1992 film Basic Instinct. A few of the other representative films produced partially in Sonoma County are:

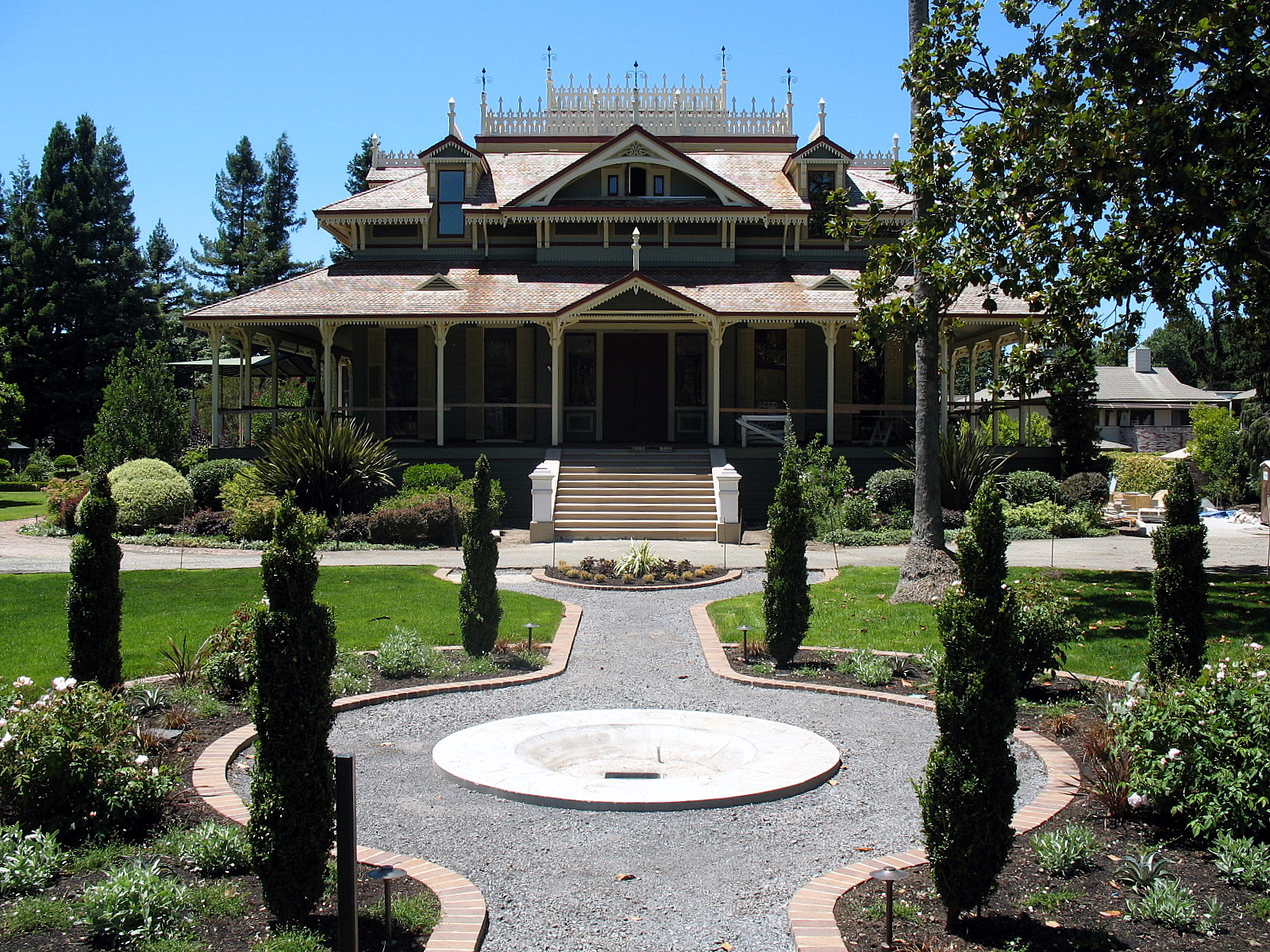
McDonald Mansion, Santa Rosa, exterior used in 1960's Pollyanna

== Representative film locations ==
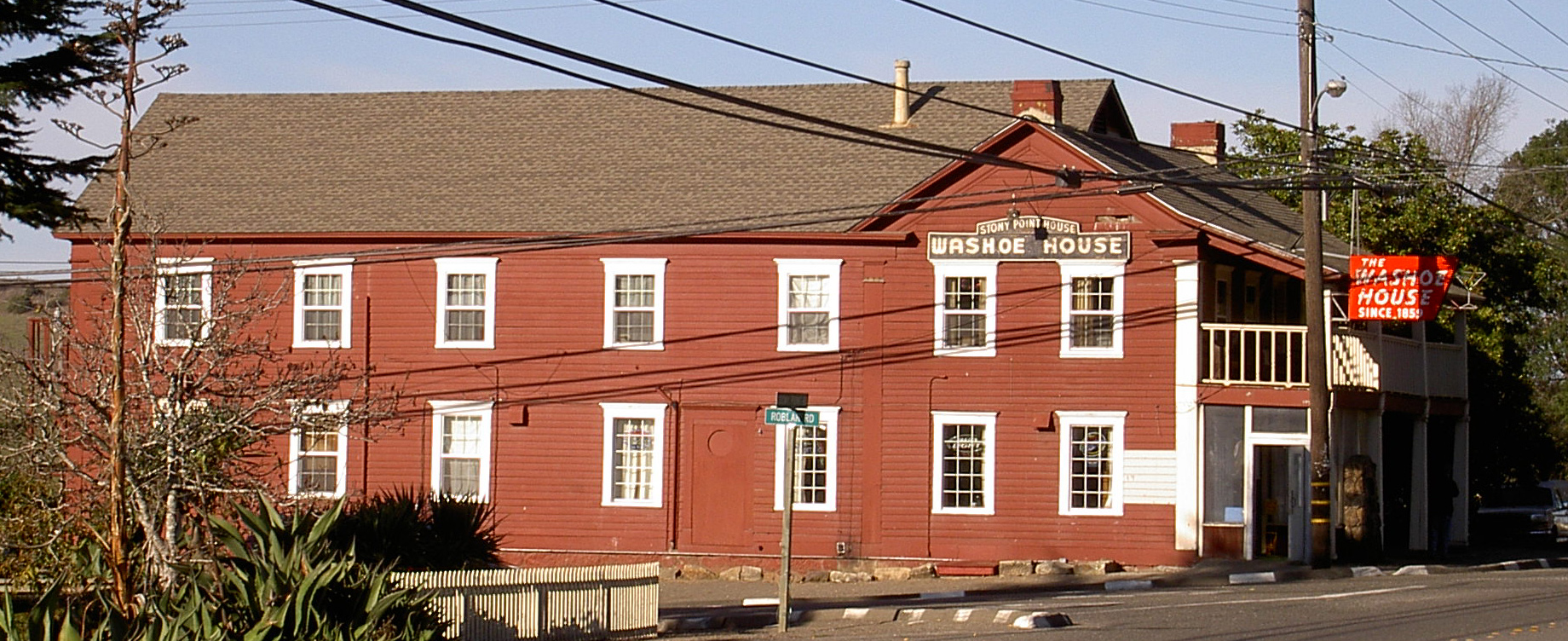
Washoe House, Petaluma, used in True Crime (1999)

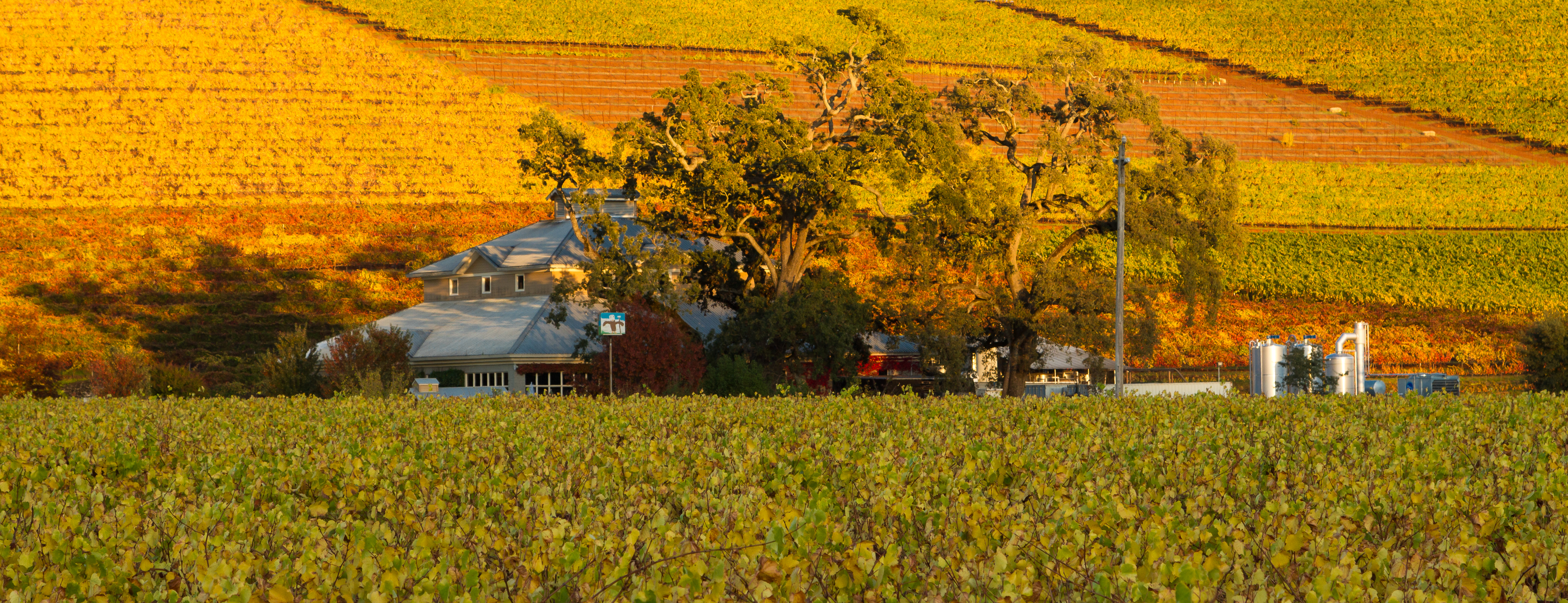
Kunde Winery, used in Bottle Shock (2008)

Sonoma County has hosted several major motion picture films:

- 1915 Bronco Billy Anderson – The only one of Anderson's 400 short westerns.
- 1965 The Third Day –
- 1972 Images – US/UK Filmed mostly in Ireland.
- 1977 Heroes –
- 1977 Mr. Billion –
- 1983 Cujo – Santa Rosa, Glen Ellen, Petaluma
- 1985 The Goonies – Final scene was filmed at Goat Rock State Beach which was used as the location for Cauldron Point.
- 1986 Peggy Sue Got Married – Many scenes of downtown Petaluma, especially Washington St., made over to resemble the 1950s, and exterior and interior shots of Santa Rosa High School.
- 1993 Nowhere to Run – Coleman Valley Road, Occidental, for farmhouse and pond scenes.
- 1996 Phenomenon – Santa Rosa Junior College.
- 2001 The Man Who Wasn't There –
- 2001 Bandits – Flamingo Hotel; Clover milk truck featuring local icon "Clo the cow"; and rural County roads (also Marin County)

Asti

- 1973 Steel Arena – Schoolhouse and store

Bodega

- 1963 The Birds – Church and schoolhouse (also Marin County)
- 1985 The Goonies – Final scene

Cazadero

- 1993 The Beverly Hillbillies

Cloverdale

- 1955 Many Rivers to Cross –
- 1993 So I Married an Axe Murderer – Cloverdale Airport (also San Francisco and Alcatraz).

Cotati

- 1947 The Farmer's Daughter – Penngrove and Cotati.
- 1990 Flatliners – (also Los Angeles, Chicago Museum of Science and Industry).

Glen Ellen

- 1982 Shoot the Moon – Glen Ellen and Jack London's Wolf House (also Marin County).
- 2008 Bottle Shock –

Healdsburg

- 1996 Scream (film) – Healdsburg Plaza, Healdsburg City Hall (also Glen Ellen, Santa Rosa, and Sonoma)
- 1999 Mumford

Occidental

- 1993 Nowhere to Run – Taylor Lane and Occidental with farmhouse and pond scenes.

Penngrove

- 1947 The Farmer's Daughter – Penngrove and Cotati.

Petaluma

See also: Petaluma, California § Film locations
- 1973 American Graffiti – Many scenes filmed in and around downtown Petaluma. Drag race scenes on Petaluma Blvd and near the end of the movie on Frates Rd.
- 1984 Impulse – Farm sequences filmed in Petaluma.
- 1986 Howard the Duck Flight scenes with Petaluma Bridge.
- 1997 Inventing the Abbotts Downtown scenes. They brought in a snow machine.
- 1999 True Crime – The Washoe House restaurant on Stony Point Road

Rohnert Park

- 1992 Basic Instinct – Petaluma and Rohnert Park (also Carmel and San Francisco)
- 1994 Getting Even With Dad – Rohnert Park Scandia Fun Center
- 2009 Biggest Loser – Rohnert Park, at the Rancho Cotate High School football field, and in the gym.

Russian River

- 1914 Salomy Jane – Guerneville, Monte Rio (also Marin County, near Mount Tamalpais).
- 1925 Braveheart – Along the river.
- 1942 Holiday Inn – Village Inn Lodge in Monte Rio as the "Holiday Inn" with tons of artificial snow.

Sebastopol

- 1949 Thieves' Highway – Gold Ridge Road.
- 1985 Smooth Talk – Sebastopol, Gravenstein Highway and Santa Rosa.
- 1996 Phenomenon – Blank Road.
- 1999 Mumford – Sebastopol, Analy High School and Old Main Street Saloon.
- 2017 13 Reasons Why – Sebastopol, Analy High School.

Santa Rosa

- 1943 Shadow of a Doubt – Courthouse Square, Railroad Square, Library, Hotel La Rose, Tower Theater.
- 2003 S.W.A.T. (End of Movie where private plane gets hijacked – @ Sonoma County Airport /"Charles Schulz Airport") –

See: Santa Rosa, Larkfield, Windsor, Wikiup California#Film locations

Sonoma

- 1973 American Graffiti – Schellville along Highway 121 between Napa and Petaluma.
- 1978 The Magic of Lassie – Hop Kiln Winery.
- 1988 Tucker: The Man and His Dream – Sonoma (also Oakland, San Bruno, San Francisco, and Marin).
- 1996 Scream – Sonoma Community Center on East Napa Street.
- 2001 The Animal – Sonoma City Hall as Police Headquarters; Historic Plaza.
- 2008 Bottle Shock – Sonoma Plaza and Duhig Road (road labeled "To Davis"), Kunde Winery.

== See also ==
- Film locations in Santa Rosa, California
