= Washoe House =

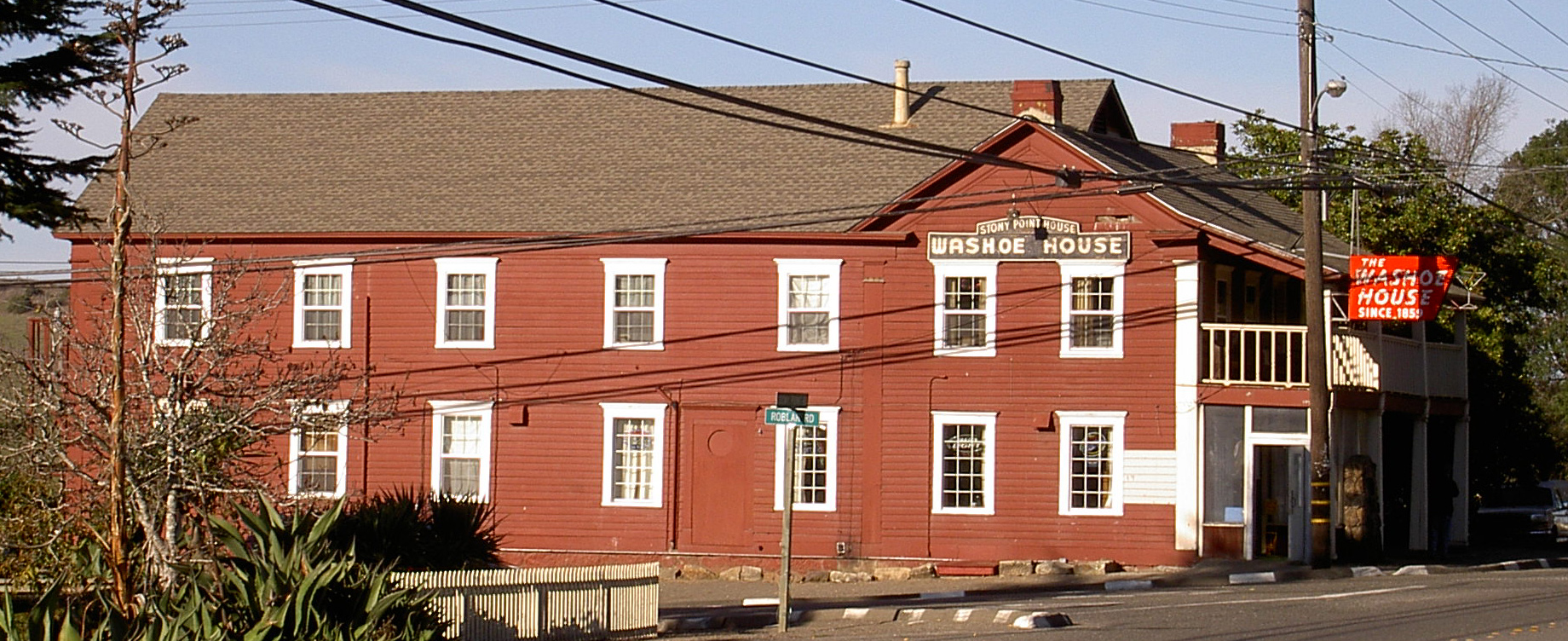
- Washoe House in 2007, viewed from the south
- Interactive map of the Washoe House area

General information
- Location: Stony Point, California, United States
- Coordinates: 38.3143°N 122.7358°W
- Completed: 1859

Washoe House is a historic roadhouse in Sonoma County, California in the United States. It is located west of Cotati, California at the juncture of Stony Point Road and Roblar Road. It lies near the headwaters of Washoe Creek and is the defining landmark of the unincorporated community of Stony Point (not to be confused with Stony Point, California, a former name of Lakeport). It is a designated Sonoma County Historic Landmark.

== History ==
Robert Ayres built the house in 1859, and it became a stop on the stagecoach routes connecting the towns of Petaluma, Santa Rosa, and Bodega during the 19th century.

In 1865, following the assassination of Abraham Lincoln, Major James Armstrong's Emmett Rifles (or Hueston Guard) rode up Stony Point Road, intent on taking vengeance against Democrats in Santa Rosa, only to turn back after stopping at this tavern. This incident became known as The Battle of Washoe House.

According to local tradition, Ulysses S. Grant once made a speech from the balcony of Washoe House; historical evidence for this is lacking, however.

A portion of the 1999 movie True Crime was filmed at Washoe House.

At various times, it has served as a hotel, butcher shop, post office, community hall, and stagecoach stop.

As of September 2018 it was operating as a restaurant and bar.

== See also ==
- Film locations in Sonoma County, California
