= Credo High School =

Coordinates: 38°19′26″N 122°40′47″W

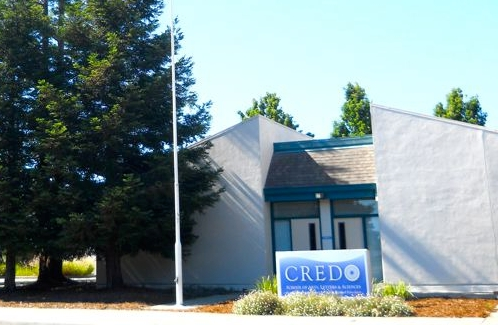

Information
- Established: 2011
- NCES School ID: 12635
- Principal: Andrea Akmenkalns

Credo High School is a tuition-free, college prep public charter school in Rohnert Park, California, following the core principles of public Waldorf education and serving students in ninth through twelfth grades. The school has been expanding annually since it opened in 2011, and there are 400 students for the 2018-2019 school year. Credo High School was granted charter approval in 2010 after three years of planning by a development team led by Executive Director Chip Romer and Education Director Thomas Schaefer. The school was originally located on Southwest Blvd. in Rohnert Park, California, but in 2017 relocated to SOMO Village in Rohnert Park, planned to be the model sustainable community in North America and dedicated to reducing carbon dioxide emissions and creating a more sustainable world. Today, Credo High School is the only "One Planet" school in the world and has been recognized as a Planetary Leader by Bioregional, Inc., the London-based international nonprofit that oversees One Planet Living worldwide. The school is financially supported by Awakening Entelechy, Inc., a nonprofit created expressly for the purpose of supporting the school.

== Campus ==
Credo High School is located at 1300 Valley House Drive, Suite 100, in Rohnert Park, California 94928. The 50,000 sq. ft. campus includes 30 classrooms, a small theater, large central commons with stage and performance area, an art wing, generous patio space for outdoor classes, a large lawn, garden, 2-acre farm and a soccer field. The school’s home gym is Callinan Sports Center, six minutes away.

== Curriculum and Classes ==
Credo’s rigorous college prep curriculum exceeds University of California “a-g” admission standards and includes a wide range of specialty subjects, including environmental education, world languages (Spanish or Mandarin), visual and practical arts, theater, music, social emotional learning, physical education and movement, farming, and four years of sustainability. In recognition of the high quality of the school’s academic program, Sonoma State University has guaranteed admission to Credo graduates with a 3.0 GPA or higher. Credo is accredited by the Western Association of Schools and Colleges.

Credo has four periods a day. Odd number periods (1,3,5,7) are on Tuesdays and Thursdays. Even number periods (2,4,6,8) are on Wednesdays and Fridays. Mondays alternate between the Even and Odd schedules each week. The school offers four music classes, and over the four years, more than 20 art classes, including blacksmithing, pottery, and blind woodturning.

Credo uses the block system, where students focus one subject intensively for four weeks. Through this, every student takes physics, chemistry, biology, and earth science each year and is able to build a deep comprehension of the subjects by graduation. All types of history are also included as morning blocks, as well as ongoing track classes. Math is taught five days a week and World Language is taught four days a week.

== Sports and Extracurricular Activities ==
Credo High School is a member of the NCS CIF sports league, NCL II. The NCL II league involves other small schools in the surrounding counties. Credo offers a range of athletics and extra-curricular activities, including boys and girls soccer and basketball, track and field, girls volleyball, boys baseball, girls softball, and co-ed golf. Weekly intramurals, a robust student council, and a variety of student-driven clubs are a rich part of student life.
