= Cotati-Rohnert Park Unified School District =

School district in California

Address
- 7165 Burton Avenue Rohnert Park, California, 94928; United States

District information
- Type: Public
- Grades: K–12
- NCES District ID: 0609940

Students and staff
- Students: 5,717 (2020–2021)
- Teachers: 250.33 (FTE)
- Staff: 249.54 (FTE)
- Student–teacher ratio: 22.84:1

Other information
- Website: www.crpusd.org

The Cotati-Rohnert Park Unified School District (CRPUSD) is a school district in Sonoma County, California.

The District serves approximately 6000 students in the cities of Cotati and Rohnert Park, the Sonoma State University census-designated place, and neighboring areas of Sonoma County. The district operates six elementary schools, two middle schools, a K-8 school, one comprehensive high school, a magnet school and charters two schools.

The district's offices are located at 7165 Burton Avenue, Rohnert Park, CA 94928-3316.

The district is supported by numerous school-connected organizations, which include PTAs, Boosters and the Education Foundation of Cotati & Rohnert Park, a non-profit organization founded in 1983 to provide private grants to the school district. Since its founding, the organization has made grants totaling over $850,000 to the district's schools.

== History ==
The building of schools always reflects growth. In 1900, there was only an 8-grade, one-room school house located on land donated by the Pages. When the first Rohnert Park children started attending school in Cotati, there were less than 250 students and only one school in Cotati School District. The Cotati-Rohnert Park School District today is a complete system. Many schools have been built. John Reed was the first school in Rohnert Park (dedicated in January, 1962), thereafter, Waldo Rohnert, Thomas Page (in Cotati), and La Fiesta Elementary Schools, Rohnert Park Jr. High School, and Rancho Cotate Sr. High School were built.

Rohnert Park also has facilities for higher education---Sonoma State College. In 1957, the California legislature appropriated $500,000 for the purchase of a site for a "North Bay Counties Four Year College" in the Santa Rosa—Petaluma corridor to serve Marin, Sonoma, and Solano Counties. Many sites were considered. Rohnert Park had the most to offer, however: the ability to provide water and sewer services, and a central location. The 99-year agreement to extend these services provides that Rohnert Park may annex the College site into the City at any time, but no other City may annex the College. Ambrose Nichols presided as the College's first President when, five years later, the College was opened to students in the temporary quarters along College View Drive (behind the shopping center on Southwest Blvd.). In the fall of 1966, the permanent buildings located on 200 acres of the old Benson Ranch were finally opened for classes and the College was in full swing.

The City has grown in both population and acreage. The population growth was strong and steady for a decade, from 2,775 at incorporation to 6,300 in 1970 when Rohnert Park surpassed Healdsburg as the third largest City in the County. Then the City rapidly grew; the population more than doubled to 15,100 by 1977.

The pattern of the City's growth with respect to size is just the reverse: ambitious in the early years, but slow since 1968. The original District consisted of the 2,700 acre Rohnert land and the 580 acre Brians land. When the City incorporated, however, only a part of the District was included in the City limits, 1,325 acres. The City grew between 1962 and 1968 to 3,812 acres. Several of the annexations were routine. Some of the proposals to annex additional lands became heated battles with people to the north and south. The golf course and country club subdivisions were annexed, so was the high school site, land for Rancho Verde and Rancho Feliz mobilehome parks, and the "L" neighborhood. But lands to the north of Wilfred Road and acreage around the College were never annexed. The most ambitious proposal of the City Council was the tongue-in-cheek resolution to annex the entire city of Santa Rosa. (This unanimously passed resolution was not kindly received by the City to the north.)

== Schools ==
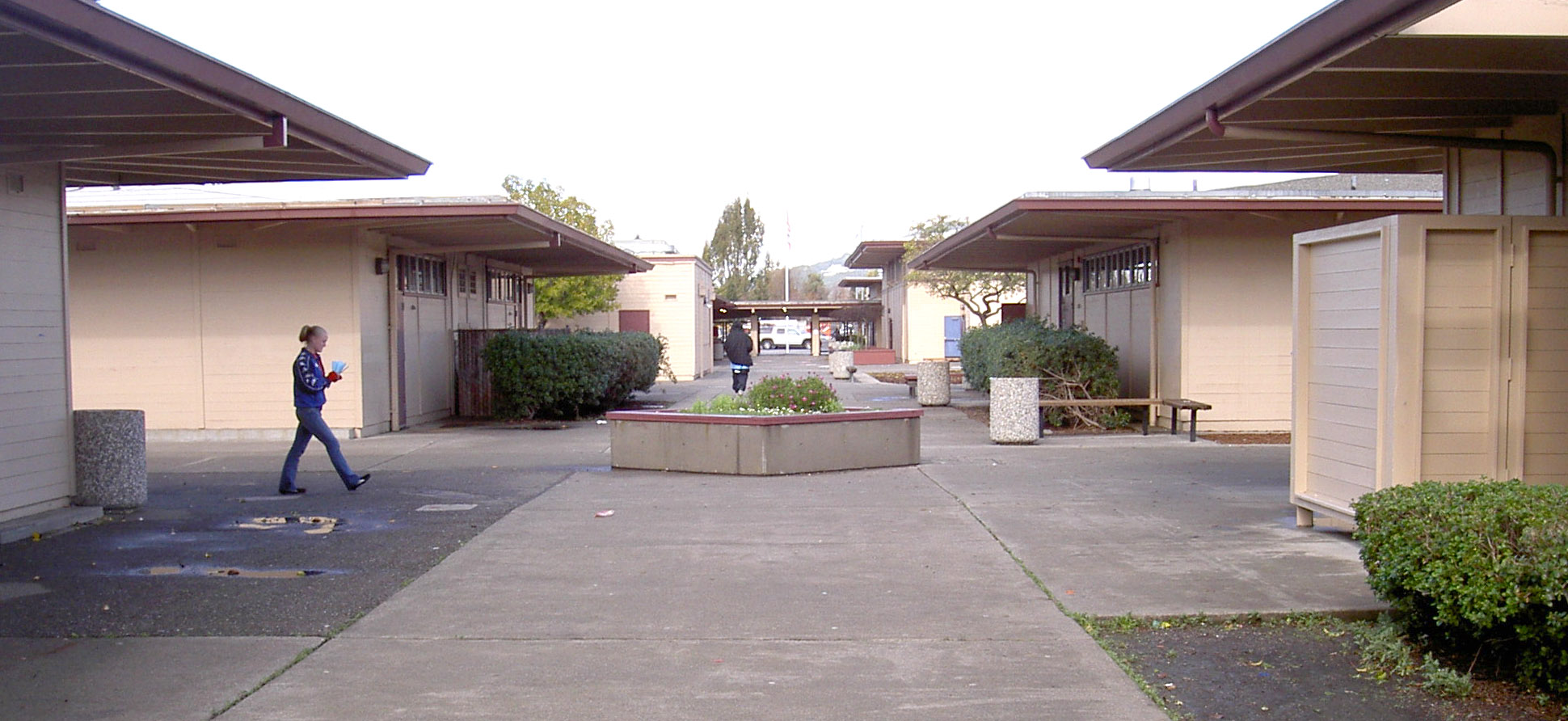
Rancho Cotate High School grounds

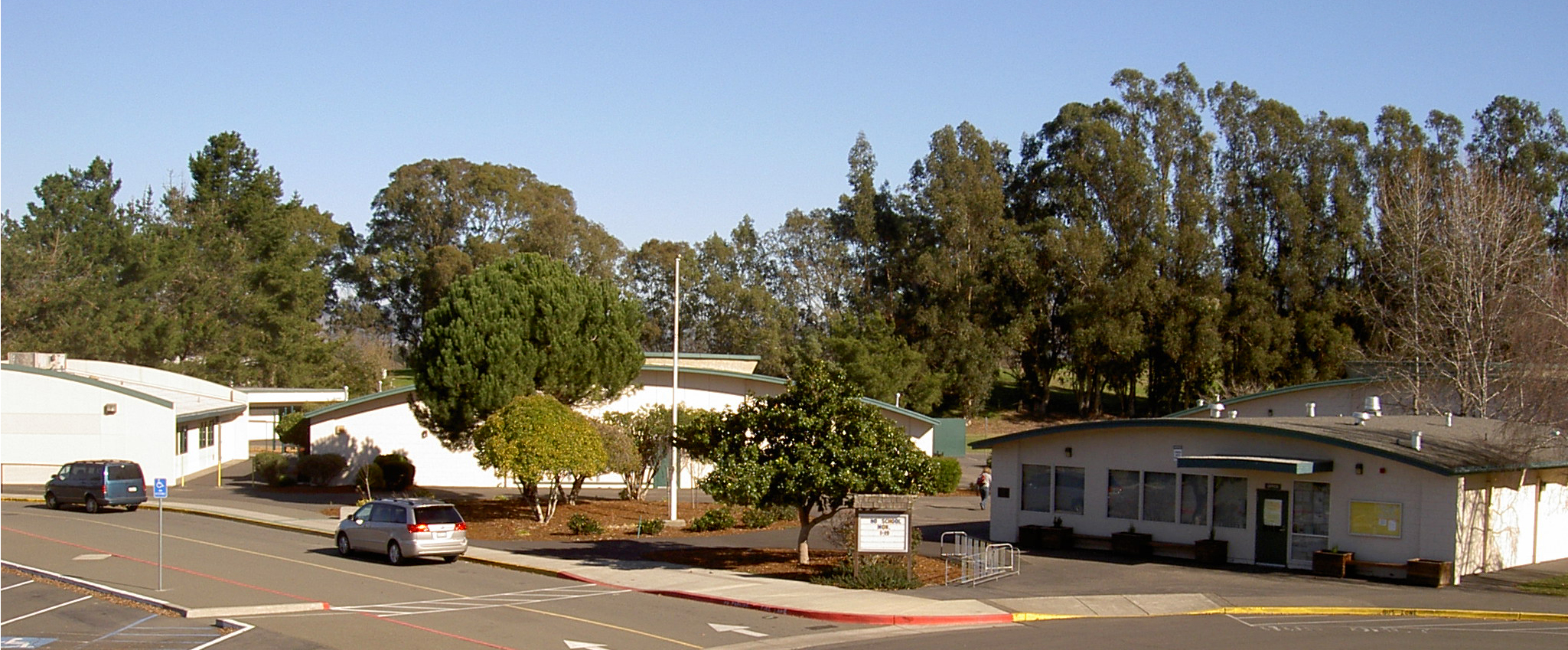
Thomas Page Elementary School grounds

High schools

- Rancho Cotate High School - Comprehensive
- Technology High School - Magnet

Middle schools

- Lawrence E. Jones Middle School
  - In Spring 2010, the school district closed Mountain Shadows Middle School due to district-wide declining enrollment and the California budget crisis and merged it with Creekside Middle School, which opened in 1995. The combined school, on the former Creekside campus, opened in August 2010 and was named Lawrence E. Jones after a longtime School Resource Officer.
- Technology Middle School

Elementary schools

- Evergreen Elementary
- John Reed Elementary
- Marguerite Hahn Elementary
- Monte Vista Elementary
- University Elementary
- Richard Crane Elementary

K-8 schools

- Thomas Page Elementary School (K-8)
  - Thomas Page Elementary School - previously grades K-6. The school is located in 1075 Madrone Avenue in Cotati. Its school mascot is the tiger, and its annual fundraising event is a "Tiger Prowl" Walk-A-Thon. Its campus, built in 1969, occupies a 10.5-acre (4.2 ha) rural parcel on Madrone Avenue, just south of State Route 116 at 38.33°N 122.726°W. The school is named after Dr. Thomas Stokes Page, an immigrant from Valparaíso, Chile, who settled in the area in the 1840s.

Charter Schools

- Academy of Arts and Sciences at Sonoma
- Credo High School

== Finances ==
In June 2012, district voters considered Measure D, a ballot measure to authorize a $89 parcel tax for five years to offset budget cuts. The Measure required 2/3 approval, and it passed with 66.9%.

== See also ==
- List of school districts in Sonoma County, California
