= Rancho Cotate High School =

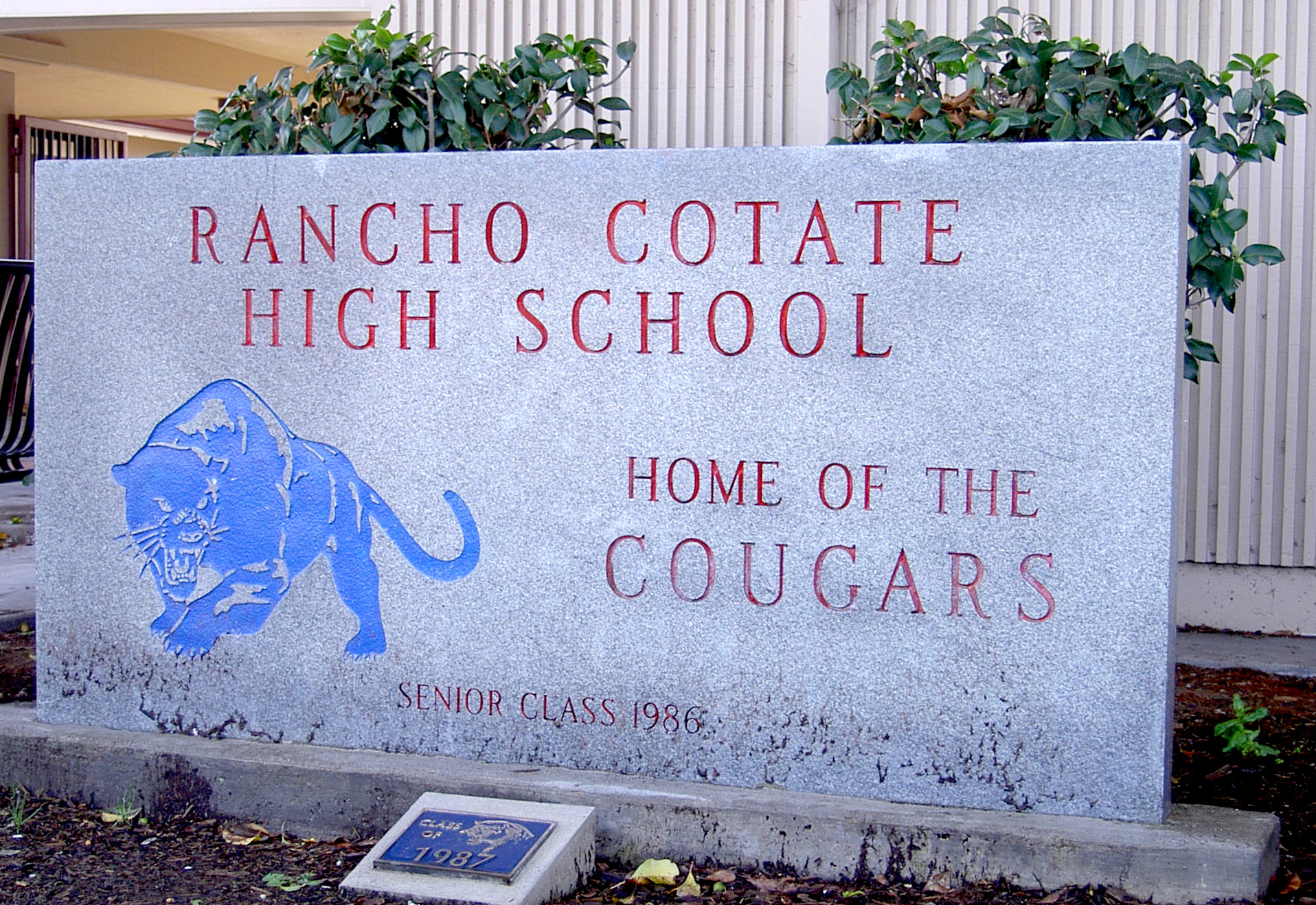

Location
- 5450 Snyder Lane; Rohnert Park, CA 94928; United States; 38.34047°N 122.684431°W

Information
- Type: Public high school
- Established: 1966
- School district: Cotati-Rohnert Park Unified School District
- Principal: Heather Ramme
- Teaching staff: 75.55 (FTE)
- Enrollment: 1,674 (2023–2024)
- Student to teacher ratio: 22.16
- Color
- Mascot: Cougar
- Website: https://rchs.crpusd.org/home

Rancho Cotate High School is a four-year comprehensive high school in Rohnert Park, California. It is located at 5450 Snyder Lane, adjacent to the campus of Sonoma State University. Students have opportunities to participate in a wide variety of sports and extra curricular activities.

It was established in 1966 and named after the Rancho Cotate land grant. It serves the Cotati-Rohnert Park Unified School District. Enrollment in the 2006–2007 school year was about 1800-1900 students. A new football stadium was built in 2008. In the summer of 2019, the construction of a new Theatre, Arts, and Gymnasium building was completed.

The high school is fed by Lawrence E. Jones Middle School.

== Extracurricular activities ==
Students have opportunities to participate in a wide variety of sports and extra curricular activities. There are over forty organizations on campus, and more than eighteen different sports are offered.

The journalism program produces the student-run publication for the school, which has received recognition on the local, regional, and national level. Such accolades have been awarded by the Press Democrat, Society of Professional Journalists, and Journalism Education Association/National Scholastic Press Association.

== Notable alumni ==
- Brandon Morrow (Class of 2003) — Major League Baseball pitcher
- Nicole Aunapu Mann (Class of 1995) — Lt. Col in the USMC and NASA astronaut, international Artemis program; contender to be the first woman on the Moon
- Brande Roderick (Class of 1992) — model and actress
