= Association football club names =

Association football club names are a part of the sport's culture, reflecting century-old traditions. Club names may reflect the geographical, cultural, religious or political affiliations – or simply be the brand name of a club's primary sponsor. Because of the British origin of the modern game and the prevalence of the English language, many clubs, even outside Europe, have their names written in English.

In Europe, most clubs are named after their towns or cities (e.g. "Deportivo de A Coruña", "Liverpool F.C.", "Hamburger SV"). In South America, clubs are more likely to have names that do not include the name of the city.

== Common versus official usage ==
It is not uncommon for a club to be known in common usage by a name other than its official name, or the name on the badge.

Other clubs are more usually known by nicknames or contractions of their full names, for instance, Vasco da Gama is usually called simply Vasco, F.C. Internazionale Milano is contracted to Inter or Inter Milan, Sporting Clube de Portugal is often called Sporting. Manchester United is often shortened to Man Utd, and Lyon or OL used instead of Olympique Lyonnais.

Some clubs are commonly referred to by their initials, such as PSG for Paris Saint-Germain and PNE for Preston North End.

== Profession/education ==
=== Profession ===
Topic	Meaning	Country	Clubs
Agriculture	Kolos is Ukrainian for spike and stands for the Kolos sport society of agriculture workers. Nyva means field. Meliorator stands for working in drainage or canal development.	Belarus	Meliorator Zhitkovichi, Niva Dolbizno, BGATU-Niva Samokhvalovichi (defunct), Kolos Ustye (until 1993)
Agriculture	Kolos is Ukrainian for spike and stands for the Kolos sport society of agriculture workers. Nyva means field. Meliorator stands for working in drainage or canal development.	Kazakhstan	Meliorator Chimkent (until 1992)
Agriculture	Kolos is Ukrainian for spike and stands for the Kolos sport society of agriculture workers. Nyva means field. Meliorator stands for working in drainage or canal development.	Kyrgyzstan	Kolos Nizhnechuyskoye
Agriculture	Kolos is Ukrainian for spike and stands for the Kolos sport society of agriculture workers. Nyva means field. Meliorator stands for working in drainage or canal development.	Russia	Kolos Pokrovskoye, Kolos Bykovo (defunct), Kolos Krasnodar (defunct), Niva Slavyansk-na-Kubani (defunct)
Agriculture	Kolos is Ukrainian for spike and stands for the Kolos sport society of agriculture workers. Nyva means field. Meliorator stands for working in drainage or canal development.	Soviet Union	Kolhospnyk Berehove (until 1962), Kolhospnyk Cherkasy (until 1967), Kolhospnyk Poltava (until 1965), Kolhospnyk Rivne (until 1967), Kolos Pavlohrad (until 1982), Kolos Poltava (until 1985), WFC Nyva Baryshivka (until 1991)
Agriculture	Kolos is Ukrainian for spike and stands for the Kolos sport society of agriculture workers. Nyva means field. Meliorator stands for working in drainage or canal development.	Ukraine	Kolos Buchach, Kolos Kovalivka, Kolos Luzhany (until 1996), Kolos Nikopol (until 1992), Meliorator Kakhovka (until 1995), Nyva Bershad, Nyva Buzova, Nyva Ternopil, Nyva Vinnytsia, Nyva Myronivka (defunct), Nyva-Tekstylnyk Dunaivtsi (until 2006)
Armed forces	For sport clubs affiliated with or named after the armed forces of a country. See also sports societies section.	Armenia	FC BKMA Yerevan
Armed forces	For sport clubs affiliated with or named after the armed forces of a country. See also sports societies section.	Barbados	Barbados Defence Force Sports Program
Armed forces	For sport clubs affiliated with or named after the armed forces of a country. See also sports societies section.	Belize	Belize Defence Force
Armed forces	For sport clubs affiliated with or named after the armed forces of a country. See also sports societies section.	Benin	Forces Armées
Armed forces	For sport clubs affiliated with or named after the armed forces of a country. See also sports societies section.	Bhutan	Royal Bhutan Army FC (defunct)
Armed forces	For sport clubs affiliated with or named after the armed forces of a country. See also sports societies section.	Botswana	Botswana Defence Force XI
Armed forces	For sport clubs affiliated with or named after the armed forces of a country. See also sports societies section.	Brunei	Royal Brunei Armed Forces
Armed forces	For sport clubs affiliated with or named after the armed forces of a country. See also sports societies section.	Bulgaria	CSKA Sofia
Armed forces	For sport clubs affiliated with or named after the armed forces of a country. See also sports societies section.	Burkina Faso	US des Forces Armées
Armed forces	For sport clubs affiliated with or named after the armed forces of a country. See also sports societies section.	Canada	Cavalry FC
Armed forces	For sport clubs affiliated with or named after the armed forces of a country. See also sports societies section.	Central African Republic	Forces Armées Centrafricaine
Armed forces	For sport clubs affiliated with or named after the armed forces of a country. See also sports societies section.	China	Bayi (defunct)
Armed forces	For sport clubs affiliated with or named after the armed forces of a country. See also sports societies section.	England	United Services Portsmouth, Royal Artillery (Portsmouth) F.C. (defunct)
Armed forces	For sport clubs affiliated with or named after the armed forces of a country. See also sports societies section.	Ethiopia	Defence Force
Armed forces	For sport clubs affiliated with or named after the armed forces of a country. See also sports societies section.	(The Gambia) Gambia	Gambia Armed Forces
Armed forces	For sport clubs affiliated with or named after the armed forces of a country. See also sports societies section.	Guyana	Guyana Defence Force
Armed forces	For sport clubs affiliated with or named after the armed forces of a country. See also sports societies section.	Hungary	Kispest Honvéd
Armed forces	For sport clubs affiliated with or named after the armed forces of a country. See also sports societies section.	Kazakhstan	CSKA Almaty (defunct)
Armed forces	For sport clubs affiliated with or named after the armed forces of a country. See also sports societies section.	Laos	Lao Army
Armed forces	For sport clubs affiliated with or named after the armed forces of a country. See also sports societies section.	Lesotho	Lesotho Defence Force
Armed forces	For sport clubs affiliated with or named after the armed forces of a country. See also sports societies section.	Lithuania	Kauno Jėgeriai (defunct), FK Saliutas Vilnius (defunct), FK Riteriai
Armed forces	For sport clubs affiliated with or named after the armed forces of a country. See also sports societies section.	Malawi	Malawi Armed Forces College, Kamuzu Barracks, Moyale Barracks
Armed forces	For sport clubs affiliated with or named after the armed forces of a country. See also sports societies section.	Malaysia	Armed Forces F.C.
Armed forces	For sport clubs affiliated with or named after the armed forces of a country. See also sports societies section.	Mauritania	AS Armée Nationale
Armed forces	For sport clubs affiliated with or named after the armed forces of a country. See also sports societies section.	Moldova	CSCA Chişinău (formerly, defunct)
Armed forces	For sport clubs affiliated with or named after the armed forces of a country. See also sports societies section.	Morocco	AS FAR
Armed forces	For sport clubs affiliated with or named after the armed forces of a country. See also sports societies section.	Nepal	Nepal Army F.C.
Armed forces	For sport clubs affiliated with or named after the armed forces of a country. See also sports societies section.	Pakistan	Pakistan Army
Armed forces	For sport clubs affiliated with or named after the armed forces of a country. See also sports societies section.	Philippines	Philippine Air Force
Armed forces	For sport clubs affiliated with or named after the armed forces of a country. See also sports societies section.	Poland	Legia Warsaw, Śmigły Wilno
Armed forces	For sport clubs affiliated with or named after the armed forces of a country. See also sports societies section.	Romania	CSA Steaua București
Armed forces	For sport clubs affiliated with or named after the armed forces of a country. See also sports societies section.	Russia	CSKA Moscow, SKA-Rostov, SKA-Khabarovsk
Armed forces	For sport clubs affiliated with or named after the armed forces of a country. See also sports societies section.	Scotland	Third Lanark A.C. (defunct)
Armed forces	For sport clubs affiliated with or named after the armed forces of a country. See also sports societies section.	Sierra Leone	Republic of Sierra Leone Armed Forces
Armed forces	For sport clubs affiliated with or named after the armed forces of a country. See also sports societies section.	Singapore	Singapore Armed Forces (formerly, defunct)
Armed forces	For sport clubs affiliated with or named after the armed forces of a country. See also sports societies section.	Soviet Union	SKA Lviv (defunct), VPS Kharkiv (defunct)
Armed forces	For sport clubs affiliated with or named after the armed forces of a country. See also sports societies section.	Suriname	SNL
Armed forces	For sport clubs affiliated with or named after the armed forces of a country. See also sports societies section.	Tajikistan	CSKA Dushanbe (defunct), CSKA Pamir Dushanbe, Khosilot Farkhor
Armed forces	For sport clubs affiliated with or named after the armed forces of a country. See also sports societies section.	Trinidad and Tobago	Defence Force
Armed forces	For sport clubs affiliated with or named after the armed forces of a country. See also sports societies section.	Uganda	Uganda Peoples’ Defence Force
Armed forces	For sport clubs affiliated with or named after the armed forces of a country. See also sports societies section.	Ukraine	CSKA Kyiv, SKA-Lotto Odesa (defunct), SKAD-Yalpuh Bolhrad (defunct), VPS Kramatorsk (defunct), SKA Odesa (until 1992)
Armed forces	For sport clubs affiliated with or named after the armed forces of a country. See also sports societies section.	United States	Charleston Battery, New York Generals (defunct)
Armed forces	For sport clubs affiliated with or named after the armed forces of a country. See also sports societies section.	Vatican City	FC Guardia
Armed forces	For sport clubs affiliated with or named after the armed forces of a country. See also sports societies section.	Zambia	Zambian Army
Arsenal	Factories creating weapons. Granat is the Polish for grenade	Argentina	Arsenal de Sarandí
Arsenal	Factories creating weapons. Granat is the Polish for grenade	Belarus	FC Arsenal Dzerzhinsk
Arsenal	Factories creating weapons. Granat is the Polish for grenade	Brazil	Arsenal
Arsenal	Factories creating weapons. Granat is the Polish for grenade	Czech Republic	FK Arsenal Česká Lípa
Arsenal	Factories creating weapons. Granat is the Polish for grenade	England	Arsenal
Arsenal	Factories creating weapons. Granat is the Polish for grenade	Ghana	Berekum Arsenal
Arsenal	Factories creating weapons. Granat is the Polish for grenade	Honduras	Arsenal F.C.
Arsenal	Factories creating weapons. Granat is the Polish for grenade	Lesotho	Arsenal FC
Arsenal	Factories creating weapons. Granat is the Polish for grenade	Mauritius	Arsenal Wanderers
Arsenal	Factories creating weapons. Granat is the Polish for grenade	Montenegro	FK Arsenal Tivat
Arsenal	Factories creating weapons. Granat is the Polish for grenade	Poland	Granat Skarżysko-Kamienna
Arsenal	Factories creating weapons. Granat is the Polish for grenade	Russia	FC Arsenal Tula
Arsenal	Factories creating weapons. Granat is the Polish for grenade	Scotland	Arsenal North
Arsenal	Factories creating weapons. Granat is the Polish for grenade	Serbia	FK Arsenal 1930
Arsenal	Factories creating weapons. Granat is the Polish for grenade	Spain	Club Arsenal (defunct)
Arsenal	Factories creating weapons. Granat is the Polish for grenade	Suriname	SV Arsenal
Arsenal	Factories creating weapons. Granat is the Polish for grenade	Ukraine	Arsenal Kharkiv, Arsenal Kyiv, FC Arsenal-Kyivshchyna Bila Tserkva (defunct)
Arsenal	Factories creating weapons. Granat is the Polish for grenade	United States	Detroit Arsenal (defunct)
Aviation		Angola	Atlético Sport Aviação
Aviation		Australia	Newcastle Jets
Aviation		Canada	Edmonton Aviators (defunct)
Aviation		England	British Airways, Crawley Down Gatwick, Oxhey Jets
Aviation		Germany	Lufthansa SG Berlin (defunct)
Aviation		India	Air India
Aviation		Japan	All Nippon Airways (defunct)
Aviation		Kingdom of Romania	Industria Aeronautică Română Brașov (defunct)
Aviation		Laos	Lao Airlines
Aviation		Pakistan	Pakistan Civil Aviation Authority (defunct), Pakistan International Airlines (defunct)
Aviation		Saint Kitts and Nevis	United Old Road Jets
Aviation		Spain	Club Aviación Nacional (defunct)
Aviation		United States	Arlington Aviators (defunct)
Aviation		Wales	Cardiff Airport
Banking		Egypt	National Bank of Egypt
Banking		England	Bankers F.C. (defunct), National Westminster Bank
Banking		Ethiopia	Commercial Bank of Ethiopia
Banking		India	Indian Bank, J&K Bank, State Bank of India Kerala
Banking		Iran	Bank Tejarat F.C. (defunct)
Banking		Kenya	Kenya Commercial Bank
Banking		Malaysia	Public Bank (defunct)
Banking		Nigeria	First Bank, New Nigerian Bank, Union Bank (defunct)
Banking		Pakistan	Allied Bank (defunct), Habib Bank (defunct), National Bank of Pakistan (defunct), Zarai Taraqiati Bank (defunct)
Banking		South Korea	Chohung Bank (defunct), Hanil Bank (defunct), Goyang KB Kookmin Bank (defunct), Housing & Commercial Bank (defunct), Industrial Bank of Korea (defunct)
Banking		Taiwan	Taipei City Bank (defunct)
Banking		Thailand	Bangkok Bank (defunct), Krung Thai Bank (defunct), Thai Farmers Bank (defunct)
Banking		Zambia	Zanaco F.C.
Beer		Australia	Cascades (defunct)
Beer		England	Crosswell's Brewery (defunct), Farnham United Breweries (defunct)
Beer		Eritrea	Asmara Brewery
Beer		Ethiopia	Dashen Beer (defunct), Harar Beer
Beer		Liberia	Monrovia Club Breweries
Beer		Nigeria	Premier Breweries (defunct)
Beer		Peru	Sporting Cristal
Beer		Uganda	Nile Breweries
Beer		Ukraine	Obolon Kyiv
Beer		United States	New Jersey Brewers (defunct), St. Louis Central Breweries (defunct)
Building, Construction, etc.	Everything connected with building and constructions: clubs named after the process of building constructions, the profession (FC Stroitel), companies (), substances used for construction (FC Cement), or companies producing it (Semen Padang)	Angola	Construtores do Uíge
Building, Construction, etc.	Everything connected with building and constructions: clubs named after the process of building constructions, the profession (FC Stroitel), companies (), substances used for construction (FC Cement), or companies producing it (Semen Padang)	Egypt	Suez Cement (defunct)
Building, Construction, etc.	Everything connected with building and constructions: clubs named after the process of building constructions, the profession (FC Stroitel), companies (), substances used for construction (FC Cement), or companies producing it (Semen Padang)	Ethiopia	Muger Cement
Building, Construction, etc.	Everything connected with building and constructions: clubs named after the process of building constructions, the profession (FC Stroitel), companies (), substances used for construction (FC Cement), or companies producing it (Semen Padang)	Indonesia	Semen Padang
Building, Construction, etc.	Everything connected with building and constructions: clubs named after the process of building constructions, the profession (FC Stroitel), companies (), substances used for construction (FC Cement), or companies producing it (Semen Padang)	Nigeria	Eagle Cement (defunct)
Building, Construction, etc.	Everything connected with building and constructions: clubs named after the process of building constructions, the profession (FC Stroitel), companies (), substances used for construction (FC Cement), or companies producing it (Semen Padang)	Russia	FC Cementnik (Mikhaylovka), Stroitel Morshansk
Building, Construction, etc.	Everything connected with building and constructions: clubs named after the process of building constructions, the profession (FC Stroitel), companies (), substances used for construction (FC Cement), or companies producing it (Semen Padang)	Serbia	Cement Beočin
Building, Construction, etc.	Everything connected with building and constructions: clubs named after the process of building constructions, the profession (FC Stroitel), companies (), substances used for construction (FC Cement), or companies producing it (Semen Padang)	Soviet Union	Budivelnyk Prypiat (defunct), Budivelnyk Poltava (until 1972)
Building, Construction, etc.	Everything connected with building and constructions: clubs named after the process of building constructions, the profession (FC Stroitel), companies (), substances used for construction (FC Cement), or companies producing it (Semen Padang)	Ukraine	Tsementnyk-Khorda Mykolaiv (until 2002)
Cars	Club names containing the name of an automobile company. These clubs were either founded as works teams by a company for its employees (e.g. Kamaz), bought by a company (e.g. Ford), or incorporate a corporate sponsor's name (e.g. Skoda Xanthi). Avtomobilist stands for automobile service, not automobile manufacturing.	Australia	Marconi–Datsun Leopards, Safeway United (defunct)
Cars	Club names containing the name of an automobile company. These clubs were either founded as works teams by a company for its employees (e.g. Kamaz), bought by a company (e.g. Ford), or incorporate a corporate sponsor's name (e.g. Skoda Xanthi). Avtomobilist stands for automobile service, not automobile manufacturing.	China	Dalian Huifeng Automobile Plaza (defunct)
Cars	Club names containing the name of an automobile company. These clubs were either founded as works teams by a company for its employees (e.g. Kamaz), bought by a company (e.g. Ford), or incorporate a corporate sponsor's name (e.g. Skoda Xanthi). Avtomobilist stands for automobile service, not automobile manufacturing.	England	Vauxhall Motors, Coventry Alvis, Ford Motors (defunct), Hucknall Rolls Leisure (defunct), Mercedes-Benz F.C. (defunct), Sunderland Nissan (defunct)
Cars	Club names containing the name of an automobile company. These clubs were either founded as works teams by a company for its employees (e.g. Kamaz), bought by a company (e.g. Ford), or incorporate a corporate sponsor's name (e.g. Skoda Xanthi). Avtomobilist stands for automobile service, not automobile manufacturing.	Greece	Skoda Xanthi
Cars	Club names containing the name of an automobile company. These clubs were either founded as works teams by a company for its employees (e.g. Kamaz), bought by a company (e.g. Ford), or incorporate a corporate sponsor's name (e.g. Skoda Xanthi). Avtomobilist stands for automobile service, not automobile manufacturing.	(Republic of Ireland) Ireland	Ford (defunct)
Cars	Club names containing the name of an automobile company. These clubs were either founded as works teams by a company for its employees (e.g. Kamaz), bought by a company (e.g. Ford), or incorporate a corporate sponsor's name (e.g. Skoda Xanthi). Avtomobilist stands for automobile service, not automobile manufacturing.	Italy	FIAT Torino
Cars	Club names containing the name of an automobile company. These clubs were either founded as works teams by a company for its employees (e.g. Kamaz), bought by a company (e.g. Ford), or incorporate a corporate sponsor's name (e.g. Skoda Xanthi). Avtomobilist stands for automobile service, not automobile manufacturing.	Japan	Honda Motor, Mitsubishi Mizushima FC, Nissan FC Ladies (defunct)
Cars	Club names containing the name of an automobile company. These clubs were either founded as works teams by a company for its employees (e.g. Kamaz), bought by a company (e.g. Ford), or incorporate a corporate sponsor's name (e.g. Skoda Xanthi). Avtomobilist stands for automobile service, not automobile manufacturing.	Laos	Lao Toyota, Mazda Laos GB
Cars	Club names containing the name of an automobile company. These clubs were either founded as works teams by a company for its employees (e.g. Kamaz), bought by a company (e.g. Ford), or incorporate a corporate sponsor's name (e.g. Skoda Xanthi). Avtomobilist stands for automobile service, not automobile manufacturing.	Malaysia	Proton F.C. (defunct)
Cars	Club names containing the name of an automobile company. These clubs were either founded as works teams by a company for its employees (e.g. Kamaz), bought by a company (e.g. Ford), or incorporate a corporate sponsor's name (e.g. Skoda Xanthi). Avtomobilist stands for automobile service, not automobile manufacturing.	Northern Ireland	Ford F.C.
Cars	Club names containing the name of an automobile company. These clubs were either founded as works teams by a company for its employees (e.g. Kamaz), bought by a company (e.g. Ford), or incorporate a corporate sponsor's name (e.g. Skoda Xanthi). Avtomobilist stands for automobile service, not automobile manufacturing.	Romania	Dacia Pitești (defunct)
Cars	Club names containing the name of an automobile company. These clubs were either founded as works teams by a company for its employees (e.g. Kamaz), bought by a company (e.g. Ford), or incorporate a corporate sponsor's name (e.g. Skoda Xanthi). Avtomobilist stands for automobile service, not automobile manufacturing.	Russia	KAMAZ, Lada Togliatti, Torpedo-ZIL
Cars	Club names containing the name of an automobile company. These clubs were either founded as works teams by a company for its employees (e.g. Kamaz), bought by a company (e.g. Ford), or incorporate a corporate sponsor's name (e.g. Skoda Xanthi). Avtomobilist stands for automobile service, not automobile manufacturing.	South Korea	Ulsan Hyundai, Jeonbuk Hyundai Motors, Daewoo Royals (formerly)
Cars	Club names containing the name of an automobile company. These clubs were either founded as works teams by a company for its employees (e.g. Kamaz), bought by a company (e.g. Ford), or incorporate a corporate sponsor's name (e.g. Skoda Xanthi). Avtomobilist stands for automobile service, not automobile manufacturing.	Soviet Union	Avtomobilist Lviv (defunct), Avtomobilist Zhytomyr (until 1976)
Cars	Club names containing the name of an automobile company. These clubs were either founded as works teams by a company for its employees (e.g. Kamaz), bought by a company (e.g. Ford), or incorporate a corporate sponsor's name (e.g. Skoda Xanthi). Avtomobilist stands for automobile service, not automobile manufacturing.	Turkey	Oyak Renault G.S.D. (defunct)
Cars	Club names containing the name of an automobile company. These clubs were either founded as works teams by a company for its employees (e.g. Kamaz), bought by a company (e.g. Ford), or incorporate a corporate sponsor's name (e.g. Skoda Xanthi). Avtomobilist stands for automobile service, not automobile manufacturing.	Ukraine	Lada Chernivtsi (defunct), Avtomobilist Sumy (until 1993), Skify-LAZ Lviv (until 1995)
Cars	Club names containing the name of an automobile company. These clubs were either founded as works teams by a company for its employees (e.g. Kamaz), bought by a company (e.g. Ford), or incorporate a corporate sponsor's name (e.g. Skoda Xanthi). Avtomobilist stands for automobile service, not automobile manufacturing.	United States	St. Louis Simpkins-Ford (defunct)
Chemical industry	Clubs named after the profession (Khimik) or chemical elements (Amkar, = AMmiak" (ammonia) and "KARbamid (carbamide)). Billingham Synthonia take their name from an agricultural fertiliser, Synthonia being a contraction of "synthetic ammonia", a product manufactured by ICI, with which the club was affiliated.	Belarus	Khimik Svetlogorsk
Chemical industry	Clubs named after the profession (Khimik) or chemical elements (Amkar, = AMmiak" (ammonia) and "KARbamid (carbamide)). Billingham Synthonia take their name from an agricultural fertiliser, Synthonia being a contraction of "synthetic ammonia", a product manufactured by ICI, with which the club was affiliated.	England	Billingham Synthonia
Chemical industry	Clubs named after the profession (Khimik) or chemical elements (Amkar, = AMmiak" (ammonia) and "KARbamid (carbamide)). Billingham Synthonia take their name from an agricultural fertiliser, Synthonia being a contraction of "synthetic ammonia", a product manufactured by ICI, with which the club was affiliated.	Kazakhstan	Khimik (Taraz)
Chemical industry	Clubs named after the profession (Khimik) or chemical elements (Amkar, = AMmiak" (ammonia) and "KARbamid (carbamide)). Billingham Synthonia take their name from an agricultural fertiliser, Synthonia being a contraction of "synthetic ammonia", a product manufactured by ICI, with which the club was affiliated.	Kyrgyzstan	Khimik Kara-Balta
Chemical industry	Clubs named after the profession (Khimik) or chemical elements (Amkar, = AMmiak" (ammonia) and "KARbamid (carbamide)). Billingham Synthonia take their name from an agricultural fertiliser, Synthonia being a contraction of "synthetic ammonia", a product manufactured by ICI, with which the club was affiliated.	Russia	FC Amkar Perm, Khimik Dzerzhinsk
Chemical industry	Clubs named after the profession (Khimik) or chemical elements (Amkar, = AMmiak" (ammonia) and "KARbamid (carbamide)). Billingham Synthonia take their name from an agricultural fertiliser, Synthonia being a contraction of "synthetic ammonia", a product manufactured by ICI, with which the club was affiliated.	Soviet Union	FC Khimik Dniprodzerzhynsk (until 1962)
Chemical industry	Clubs named after the profession (Khimik) or chemical elements (Amkar, = AMmiak" (ammonia) and "KARbamid (carbamide)). Billingham Synthonia take their name from an agricultural fertiliser, Synthonia being a contraction of "synthetic ammonia", a product manufactured by ICI, with which the club was affiliated.	Ukraine	Khimik Krasnoperekopsk, Khimik Sievierodonetsk, Khimik Kalush (until 1995), Khimik Zhytomyr (until 1997), Tytan Armiansk
Civil service		England	Civil Service F.C., Portsmouth Civil Service
Civil service		Malawi	Civil Service United
Civil service		Northern Ireland	Northern Ireland Civil Service
Civil service		Scotland	Civil Service Strollers
Civil service		Wales	Cardiff Civil Service, Civil Service (Wrexham) Cricket and Football Club (defunct)
Companies	Club names containing the name of a company. These clubs were either founded as works teams by a company for its employees (e.g. PSV), bought by a company (e.g. the Red Bull teams), or incorporate a corporate sponsor's name (e.g. Technogroup)	Austria	FC Red Bull Salzburg
Companies	Club names containing the name of a company. These clubs were either founded as works teams by a company for its employees (e.g. PSV), bought by a company (e.g. the Red Bull teams), or incorporate a corporate sponsor's name (e.g. Technogroup)	Brazil	Red Bull Bragantino, Red Bull Brasil (defunct)
Companies	Club names containing the name of a company. These clubs were either founded as works teams by a company for its employees (e.g. PSV), bought by a company (e.g. the Red Bull teams), or incorporate a corporate sponsor's name (e.g. Technogroup)	Canada	Hamilton Westinghouse (defunct)
Companies	Club names containing the name of a company. These clubs were either founded as works teams by a company for its employees (e.g. PSV), bought by a company (e.g. the Red Bull teams), or incorporate a corporate sponsor's name (e.g. Technogroup)	Egypt	Arab Contractors
Companies	Club names containing the name of a company. These clubs were either founded as works teams by a company for its employees (e.g. PSV), bought by a company (e.g. the Red Bull teams), or incorporate a corporate sponsor's name (e.g. Technogroup)	England	Electrolux (defunct), Thames Ironworks (later became West Ham United), Negretti and Zambra
Companies	Club names containing the name of a company. These clubs were either founded as works teams by a company for its employees (e.g. PSV), bought by a company (e.g. the Red Bull teams), or incorporate a corporate sponsor's name (e.g. Technogroup)	France	Evian Thonon Gaillard
Companies	Club names containing the name of a company. These clubs were either founded as works teams by a company for its employees (e.g. PSV), bought by a company (e.g. the Red Bull teams), or incorporate a corporate sponsor's name (e.g. Technogroup)	Germany	Bayer 04 Leverkusen, RB Leipzig
Companies	Club names containing the name of a company. These clubs were either founded as works teams by a company for its employees (e.g. PSV), bought by a company (e.g. the Red Bull teams), or incorporate a corporate sponsor's name (e.g. Technogroup)	Ghana	Red Bull Ghana (defunct)
Companies	Club names containing the name of a company. These clubs were either founded as works teams by a company for its employees (e.g. PSV), bought by a company (e.g. the Red Bull teams), or incorporate a corporate sponsor's name (e.g. Technogroup)	Hungary	Parmalat FC
Companies	Club names containing the name of a company. These clubs were either founded as works teams by a company for its employees (e.g. PSV), bought by a company (e.g. the Red Bull teams), or incorporate a corporate sponsor's name (e.g. Technogroup)	India	Peerless SC
Companies	Club names containing the name of a company. These clubs were either founded as works teams by a company for its employees (e.g. PSV), bought by a company (e.g. the Red Bull teams), or incorporate a corporate sponsor's name (e.g. Technogroup)	Indonesia	RANS Cilegon F.C.
Companies	Club names containing the name of a company. These clubs were either founded as works teams by a company for its employees (e.g. PSV), bought by a company (e.g. the Red Bull teams), or incorporate a corporate sponsor's name (e.g. Technogroup)	Japan	Maruyasu Okazaki, RB Omiya Ardija, Sony Sendai (defunct)
Companies	Club names containing the name of a company. These clubs were either founded as works teams by a company for its employees (e.g. PSV), bought by a company (e.g. the Red Bull teams), or incorporate a corporate sponsor's name (e.g. Technogroup)	Lithuania	FBK Kaunas (until 1999), FC Hegelmann, FK TransINVEST
Companies	Club names containing the name of a company. These clubs were either founded as works teams by a company for its employees (e.g. PSV), bought by a company (e.g. the Red Bull teams), or incorporate a corporate sponsor's name (e.g. Technogroup)	Malawi	Masters Security
Companies	Club names containing the name of a company. These clubs were either founded as works teams by a company for its employees (e.g. PSV), bought by a company (e.g. the Red Bull teams), or incorporate a corporate sponsor's name (e.g. Technogroup)	Mexico	Cruz Azul
Companies	Club names containing the name of a company. These clubs were either founded as works teams by a company for its employees (e.g. PSV), bought by a company (e.g. the Red Bull teams), or incorporate a corporate sponsor's name (e.g. Technogroup)	Netherlands	PSV
Companies	Club names containing the name of a company. These clubs were either founded as works teams by a company for its employees (e.g. PSV), bought by a company (e.g. the Red Bull teams), or incorporate a corporate sponsor's name (e.g. Technogroup)	New Zealand	Hanimex United
Companies	Club names containing the name of a company. These clubs were either founded as works teams by a company for its employees (e.g. PSV), bought by a company (e.g. the Red Bull teams), or incorporate a corporate sponsor's name (e.g. Technogroup)	Nicaragua	Parmalat FC
Companies	Club names containing the name of a company. These clubs were either founded as works teams by a company for its employees (e.g. PSV), bought by a company (e.g. the Red Bull teams), or incorporate a corporate sponsor's name (e.g. Technogroup)	Pakistan	Khan Research Laboratories
Companies	Club names containing the name of a company. These clubs were either founded as works teams by a company for its employees (e.g. PSV), bought by a company (e.g. the Red Bull teams), or incorporate a corporate sponsor's name (e.g. Technogroup)	Palau	Surangel and Sons Company
Companies	Club names containing the name of a company. These clubs were either founded as works teams by a company for its employees (e.g. PSV), bought by a company (e.g. the Red Bull teams), or incorporate a corporate sponsor's name (e.g. Technogroup)	Papua New Guinea	PS Huawei United
Companies	Club names containing the name of a company. These clubs were either founded as works teams by a company for its employees (e.g. PSV), bought by a company (e.g. the Red Bull teams), or incorporate a corporate sponsor's name (e.g. Technogroup)	Poland	Elana Toruń, KSZO Ostrowiec Świętokrzyski, Stilon Gorzów, Stomil Olsztyn
Companies	Club names containing the name of a company. These clubs were either founded as works teams by a company for its employees (e.g. PSV), bought by a company (e.g. the Red Bull teams), or incorporate a corporate sponsor's name (e.g. Technogroup)	Portugal	Fabril Barreiro, Riopele (defunct)
Companies	Club names containing the name of a company. These clubs were either founded as works teams by a company for its employees (e.g. PSV), bought by a company (e.g. the Red Bull teams), or incorporate a corporate sponsor's name (e.g. Technogroup)	Republic of Ireland	Jacobs (defunct)
Companies	Club names containing the name of a company. These clubs were either founded as works teams by a company for its employees (e.g. PSV), bought by a company (e.g. the Red Bull teams), or incorporate a corporate sponsor's name (e.g. Technogroup)	Russia	Acron, Forte
Companies	Club names containing the name of a company. These clubs were either founded as works teams by a company for its employees (e.g. PSV), bought by a company (e.g. the Red Bull teams), or incorporate a corporate sponsor's name (e.g. Technogroup)	South Korea	Suwon Samsung Bluewings, Seoul E-Land FC
Companies	Club names containing the name of a company. These clubs were either founded as works teams by a company for its employees (e.g. PSV), bought by a company (e.g. the Red Bull teams), or incorporate a corporate sponsor's name (e.g. Technogroup)	Soviet Union	Bilshovyk Kyiv (defunct)
Companies	Club names containing the name of a company. These clubs were either founded as works teams by a company for its employees (e.g. PSV), bought by a company (e.g. the Red Bull teams), or incorporate a corporate sponsor's name (e.g. Technogroup)	Suriname	Leo Victor
Companies	Club names containing the name of a company. These clubs were either founded as works teams by a company for its employees (e.g. PSV), bought by a company (e.g. the Red Bull teams), or incorporate a corporate sponsor's name (e.g. Technogroup)	Taiwan	Tatung F.C.
Companies	Club names containing the name of a company. These clubs were either founded as works teams by a company for its employees (e.g. PSV), bought by a company (e.g. the Red Bull teams), or incorporate a corporate sponsor's name (e.g. Technogroup)	Ukraine	Ahrobiznes Volochysk, Epitsentr Kamianets-Podilskyi, Krymteplytsia Molodizhne, LNZ Cherkasy, Tavria-Skif Rozdol, Temp Shepetivka, VPK-Ahro Shevchenkivka, Adoms Kremenchuk (defunct), ADVIS Khmelnytskyi (defunct), Ahrotekhservis Sumy (defunct), Alians Lypova Dolyna (defunct), Ihroservice Simferopol (defunct), Knyazha Shchaslyve (defunct), Nafkom Brovary (defunct), Olkom Melitopol (defunct), UkrAhroKom Holovkivka (defunct), Evis Mykolaiv (until 1994), Garant Donetsk (until 1995), Nikopol-NPHU (until 2017), Rihonda Bila Tserkva (until 2002), Silur Khartsyzk (until 1995), Tekhno-Center Rohatyn (until 2005), FC Yarud Mariupol (until 2022), WFC Zhytlobud-1 Kharkiv (until 2024), WFC Zhytlobud-2 Kharkiv (until 2021)
Companies	Club names containing the name of a company. These clubs were either founded as works teams by a company for its employees (e.g. PSV), bought by a company (e.g. the Red Bull teams), or incorporate a corporate sponsor's name (e.g. Technogroup)	United States	New York Red Bulls, Atlanta Datagraphic (defunct), Bethlehem Steel F.C. (defunct)
Companies	Club names containing the name of a company. These clubs were either founded as works teams by a company for its employees (e.g. PSV), bought by a company (e.g. the Red Bull teams), or incorporate a corporate sponsor's name (e.g. Technogroup)	Vatican City	Musei Vaticani
Companies	Club names containing the name of a company. These clubs were either founded as works teams by a company for its employees (e.g. PSV), bought by a company (e.g. the Red Bull teams), or incorporate a corporate sponsor's name (e.g. Technogroup)	Vietnam	Becamex Binh Duong, Viettel FC, Hoang Anh Gia Lai FC
Companies	Club names containing the name of a company. These clubs were either founded as works teams by a company for its employees (e.g. PSV), bought by a company (e.g. the Red Bull teams), or incorporate a corporate sponsor's name (e.g. Technogroup)	Wales	Brymbo Steelworks (defunct), Gap Queens Park (defunct)
Copper	Cobre is Spanish for copper, after association with copper mining	Chile	Club de Deportes Cobreloa, Club de Deportes Cobresal
Copper	Cobre is Spanish for copper, after association with copper mining	Peru	Cobresol F.B.C.
Copper	Cobre is Spanish for copper, after association with copper mining	Poland	Miedź Legnica
Customs		India	Calcutta Customs Club
Electrical	Bargh: Persian for Electricity	Cambodia	Électricité du Cambodge
Electrical	Bargh: Persian for Electricity	Ecuador	Emelec
Electrical	Bargh: Persian for Electricity	Ethiopia	Ethio Electric
Electrical	Bargh: Persian for Electricity	France	Gazélec Ajaccio
Electrical	Bargh: Persian for Electricity	Germany	1. FFC Turbine Potsdam
Electrical	Bargh: Persian for Electricity	India	Assam State Electricity Board SC
Electrical	Bargh: Persian for Electricity	Iran	Bargh Shiraz F.C.
Electrical	Bargh: Persian for Electricity	Laos	Electricite du Laos
Electrical	Bargh: Persian for Electricity	Malawi	ESCOM United
Electrical	Bargh: Persian for Electricity	Philippines	Loyola Meralco Sparks F.C.
Electrical	Bargh: Persian for Electricity	Portugal	Eléctrico F.C.
Electrical	Bargh: Persian for Electricity	Russia	Luch-Energia, Luki-Energiya
Electrical	Bargh: Persian for Electricity	Taiwan	Taiwan Power Company F.C.
Electrical	Bargh: Persian for Electricity	Ukraine	Enerhiya Nova Kakhovka, Enerhiya Yuzhnoukrainsk, Enerhetyk Burshtyn (defunct), Enerhiya Mykolaiv (defunct), Slavutych-ChAES Slavutych (until 1998)
Electrical	Bargh: Persian for Electricity	United States	Houston Dynamo
Electrical	Bargh: Persian for Electricity	Zambia	ZESCO United
Food industry	KKhP: post-Soviet name for an industrial bakery, Krystal stands for sugar crystals.	Botswana	Botswana Meat Commission
Food industry	KKhP: post-Soviet name for an industrial bakery, Krystal stands for sugar crystals.	Ethiopia	Fincha Sugar, Metehara Sugar, Wonji Sugar
Food industry	KKhP: post-Soviet name for an industrial bakery, Krystal stands for sugar crystals.	India	Food Corporation of India FC
Food industry	KKhP: post-Soviet name for an industrial bakery, Krystal stands for sugar crystals.	Kenya	West Kenya Sugar
Food industry	KKhP: post-Soviet name for an industrial bakery, Krystal stands for sugar crystals.	Soviet Union	Kharchovyk Odesa (until 1958)
Food industry	KKhP: post-Soviet name for an industrial bakery, Krystal stands for sugar crystals.	Ukraine	Krystal Chortkiv, Slovkhlib Slovyansk (defunct), Systema-KKhP Cherniakhiv (defunct)
Industry		Spain	Gijón Industrial
Industry		Soviet Union	Industriya Yenakiieve (until 1969)
Industry		Ukraine	Avanhard-Industriia Rovenky (until 1998)
Legal		England	Blackburn Law (defunct)
Legal		Wales	Lex XI
Liquor		Northern Ireland	Lisburn Distillery
Liquor		Republic of Ireland	Distillery F.C. (defunct)
Liquor		Ukraine	Spartak-Horobyna Sumy (until 2005)
Mechanical engineering	Club names containing the name of a mechanical engineering or a Machine-Building factory. These clubs were either founded as works teams by a company for its employees or named "MachineConstructor" or similar ("Mashinostroitel'"). Vahonobudivnyk is the Ukrainian for railroad car constructor, Krystal stands for semiconductor device fabrication and Prylad means device.	England	Bristol Aeroplane Company (defunct)
Mechanical engineering	Club names containing the name of a mechanical engineering or a Machine-Building factory. These clubs were either founded as works teams by a company for its employees or named "MachineConstructor" or similar ("Mashinostroitel'"). Vahonobudivnyk is the Ukrainian for railroad car constructor, Krystal stands for semiconductor device fabrication and Prylad means device.	Italy	SIAI Marchetti
Mechanical engineering	Club names containing the name of a mechanical engineering or a Machine-Building factory. These clubs were either founded as works teams by a company for its employees or named "MachineConstructor" or similar ("Mashinostroitel'"). Vahonobudivnyk is the Ukrainian for railroad car constructor, Krystal stands for semiconductor device fabrication and Prylad means device.	Poland	Motor Lublin
Mechanical engineering	Club names containing the name of a mechanical engineering or a Machine-Building factory. These clubs were either founded as works teams by a company for its employees or named "MachineConstructor" or similar ("Mashinostroitel'"). Vahonobudivnyk is the Ukrainian for railroad car constructor, Krystal stands for semiconductor device fabrication and Prylad means device.	Soviet Union	Elektron Ivano-Frankivsk (defunct), Mashynobudivnyk Kyiv (until 1959)
Mechanical engineering	Club names containing the name of a mechanical engineering or a Machine-Building factory. These clubs were either founded as works teams by a company for its employees or named "MachineConstructor" or similar ("Mashinostroitel'"). Vahonobudivnyk is the Ukrainian for railroad car constructor, Krystal stands for semiconductor device fabrication and Prylad means device.	Ukraine	Elektron Romny (defunct), Krystal Kherson, Mashynobudivnyk Druzhkivka (defunct), Mashynobudivnyk Borodianka (until 1992), Motor Zaporizhzhia, Polihraftekhnika Oleksandriya (until 2003), Pryladyst Mukacheve (until 1993), Vahonobudivnyk Kremenchuk, Vahonobudivnyk Stakhanov (until 1994)
Mechanical engineering	Club names containing the name of a mechanical engineering or a Machine-Building factory. These clubs were either founded as works teams by a company for its employees or named "MachineConstructor" or similar ("Mashinostroitel'"). Vahonobudivnyk is the Ukrainian for railroad car constructor, Krystal stands for semiconductor device fabrication and Prylad means device.	Wales	Airbus UK
Medical		China	Xiangxue Pharmaceutical
Medical		Egypt	Pharco FC
Medical		England	St Bartholomew's and The Royal London Hospitals F.C.
Medical		Japan	Tanabe Mitsubishi Pharma
Medical		Nigeria	Jos University Teaching Hospital
Medical		Northern Ireland	Donard Hospital
Medical		Pakistan	Punjab Medical College (defunct)
Medical		Ukraine	Real Pharma Odesa, Medyk Morshyn (defunct), Medita Shakhtarsk (until 1995)
Medical		Vatican City	Rappresentativa Ospedale Pediatrico Bambino Gesù
Metallurgy	Foolad, Zob Ahan, and Mes: Persian for Steel, Steelworks, and Copper. Vasas: "Vas- és Fémmunkások" Hungarian for "Iron and Steel Workers", Stålkameratene Norwegian for "Steel Comrades".	Canada	Forge FC, Hamilton Steelers (1981–1992), Hamilton Steelers (1958–1967)
Metallurgy	Foolad, Zob Ahan, and Mes: Persian for Steel, Steelworks, and Copper. Vasas: "Vas- és Fémmunkások" Hungarian for "Iron and Steel Workers", Stålkameratene Norwegian for "Steel Comrades".	England	Steel, Peech & Tozer F.C. (defunct), Steel City Wanderers, Stocksbridge Park Steels
Metallurgy	Foolad, Zob Ahan, and Mes: Persian for Steel, Steelworks, and Copper. Vasas: "Vas- és Fémmunkások" Hungarian for "Iron and Steel Workers", Stålkameratene Norwegian for "Steel Comrades".	(Georgia (country)) Georgia	Metalurgi Rustavi
Metallurgy	Foolad, Zob Ahan, and Mes: Persian for Steel, Steelworks, and Copper. Vasas: "Vas- és Fémmunkások" Hungarian for "Iron and Steel Workers", Stålkameratene Norwegian for "Steel Comrades".	Hungary	Vasas SC
Metallurgy	Foolad, Zob Ahan, and Mes: Persian for Steel, Steelworks, and Copper. Vasas: "Vas- és Fémmunkások" Hungarian for "Iron and Steel Workers", Stålkameratene Norwegian for "Steel Comrades".	Iran	Foolad F.C., Steel Azin (defunct)
Metallurgy	Foolad, Zob Ahan, and Mes: Persian for Steel, Steelworks, and Copper. Vasas: "Vas- és Fémmunkások" Hungarian for "Iron and Steel Workers", Stålkameratene Norwegian for "Steel Comrades".	Japan	Nippon Steel Yawata
Metallurgy	Foolad, Zob Ahan, and Mes: Persian for Steel, Steelworks, and Copper. Vasas: "Vas- és Fémmunkások" Hungarian for "Iron and Steel Workers", Stålkameratene Norwegian for "Steel Comrades".	Latvia	FK Liepājas Metalurgs
Metallurgy	Foolad, Zob Ahan, and Mes: Persian for Steel, Steelworks, and Copper. Vasas: "Vas- és Fémmunkások" Hungarian for "Iron and Steel Workers", Stålkameratene Norwegian for "Steel Comrades".	Moldova	Iskra-Stal
Metallurgy	Foolad, Zob Ahan, and Mes: Persian for Steel, Steelworks, and Copper. Vasas: "Vas- és Fémmunkások" Hungarian for "Iron and Steel Workers", Stålkameratene Norwegian for "Steel Comrades".	Norway	IL Stålkameratene, Staal Jørpeland IL
Metallurgy	Foolad, Zob Ahan, and Mes: Persian for Steel, Steelworks, and Copper. Vasas: "Vas- és Fémmunkások" Hungarian for "Iron and Steel Workers", Stålkameratene Norwegian for "Steel Comrades".	Pakistan	Pakistan Steel (defunct)
Metallurgy	Foolad, Zob Ahan, and Mes: Persian for Steel, Steelworks, and Copper. Vasas: "Vas- és Fémmunkások" Hungarian for "Iron and Steel Workers", Stålkameratene Norwegian for "Steel Comrades".	Poland	Hutnik Kraków, Stal Mielec, Stal Rzeszów, Stal Sanok, Stal Stalowa Wola
Metallurgy	Foolad, Zob Ahan, and Mes: Persian for Steel, Steelworks, and Copper. Vasas: "Vas- és Fémmunkások" Hungarian for "Iron and Steel Workers", Stålkameratene Norwegian for "Steel Comrades".	Romania	Oțelul Galați
Metallurgy	Foolad, Zob Ahan, and Mes: Persian for Steel, Steelworks, and Copper. Vasas: "Vas- és Fémmunkások" Hungarian for "Iron and Steel Workers", Stålkameratene Norwegian for "Steel Comrades".	Russia	Metallurg Lipetsk
Metallurgy	Foolad, Zob Ahan, and Mes: Persian for Steel, Steelworks, and Copper. Vasas: "Vas- és Fémmunkások" Hungarian for "Iron and Steel Workers", Stålkameratene Norwegian for "Steel Comrades".	South Korea	Pohang Steelers
Metallurgy	Foolad, Zob Ahan, and Mes: Persian for Steel, Steelworks, and Copper. Vasas: "Vas- és Fémmunkások" Hungarian for "Iron and Steel Workers", Stålkameratene Norwegian for "Steel Comrades".	Soviet Union	Metalurh Dnipropetrovsk (until 1961), Metalurh Odesa (until 1955)
Metallurgy	Foolad, Zob Ahan, and Mes: Persian for Steel, Steelworks, and Copper. Vasas: "Vas- és Fémmunkások" Hungarian for "Iron and Steel Workers", Stålkameratene Norwegian for "Steel Comrades".	Turkey	Kardemir Karabükspor
Metallurgy	Foolad, Zob Ahan, and Mes: Persian for Steel, Steelworks, and Copper. Vasas: "Vas- és Fémmunkások" Hungarian for "Iron and Steel Workers", Stålkameratene Norwegian for "Steel Comrades".	Ukraine	Elektrometalurh-NZF Nikopol, Metalist Kharkiv, Metalist 1925 Kharkiv, Metalurh Kupiansk, Metalurh Novomoskovsk, Metalurh Zaporizhzhia, Metalurh Donetsk (defunct), Metalurh Kerch (until 1995), Metalurh Komsomolske (until 2006), Metalurh Kostiantynivka (until 1994), Metalurh Mariupol (until 2002), Pivdenstal Yenakiieve, Stal Alchevsk, Stal Kamianske (defunct)
Metallurgy	Foolad, Zob Ahan, and Mes: Persian for Steel, Steelworks, and Copper. Vasas: "Vas- és Fémmunkások" Hungarian for "Iron and Steel Workers", Stålkameratene Norwegian for "Steel Comrades".	United States	St. Louis Scullin Steel (defunct)
Metallurgy	Foolad, Zob Ahan, and Mes: Persian for Steel, Steelworks, and Copper. Vasas: "Vas- és Fémmunkások" Hungarian for "Iron and Steel Workers", Stålkameratene Norwegian for "Steel Comrades".	Uzbekistan	Metallurg Bekabad
Metallurgy	Foolad, Zob Ahan, and Mes: Persian for Steel, Steelworks, and Copper. Vasas: "Vas- és Fémmunkások" Hungarian for "Iron and Steel Workers", Stålkameratene Norwegian for "Steel Comrades".	Wales	Tata Steel United
Metallurgy	Foolad, Zob Ahan, and Mes: Persian for Steel, Steelworks, and Copper. Vasas: "Vas- és Fémmunkások" Hungarian for "Iron and Steel Workers", Stålkameratene Norwegian for "Steel Comrades".	Zimbabwe	Lancashire Steel
Mining	GKS: Polish for miner sport clubs Górnik: Polish for miner Zagłębie: Polish for coalfield Minero: Spanish for miner Colliery: Coal mine Shakhtar: Ukrainian for miner Than: Vietnamese for coal mine	Australia	Whitsunday Miners
Mining	GKS: Polish for miner sport clubs Górnik: Polish for miner Zagłębie: Polish for coalfield Minero: Spanish for miner Colliery: Coal mine Shakhtar: Ukrainian for miner Than: Vietnamese for coal mine	Belarus	Shakhtyor Soligorsk
Mining	GKS: Polish for miner sport clubs Górnik: Polish for miner Zagłębie: Polish for coalfield Minero: Spanish for miner Colliery: Coal mine Shakhtar: Ukrainian for miner Than: Vietnamese for coal mine	Bosnia and Herzegovina	Rudar Ugljevik, Rudar Prijedor, Rudar Kakanj
Mining	GKS: Polish for miner sport clubs Górnik: Polish for miner Zagłębie: Polish for coalfield Minero: Spanish for miner Colliery: Coal mine Shakhtar: Ukrainian for miner Than: Vietnamese for coal mine	England	Atherton Collieries, Club Thorne Colliery, Gedling Miners Welfare, Kimberley Miners Welfare
Mining	GKS: Polish for miner sport clubs Górnik: Polish for miner Zagłębie: Polish for coalfield Minero: Spanish for miner Colliery: Coal mine Shakhtar: Ukrainian for miner Than: Vietnamese for coal mine	Kazakhstan	Shakhter Karagandy, Gornyak (Hromtau)
Mining	GKS: Polish for miner sport clubs Górnik: Polish for miner Zagłębie: Polish for coalfield Minero: Spanish for miner Colliery: Coal mine Shakhtar: Ukrainian for miner Than: Vietnamese for coal mine	Kyrgyzstan	Shakhtyor Kyzyl-Kiya
Mining	GKS: Polish for miner sport clubs Górnik: Polish for miner Zagłębie: Polish for coalfield Minero: Spanish for miner Colliery: Coal mine Shakhtar: Ukrainian for miner Than: Vietnamese for coal mine	Mexico	Mineros de Zacatecas
Mining	GKS: Polish for miner sport clubs Górnik: Polish for miner Zagłębie: Polish for coalfield Minero: Spanish for miner Colliery: Coal mine Shakhtar: Ukrainian for miner Than: Vietnamese for coal mine	Montenegro	Rudar Pljevlja
Mining	GKS: Polish for miner sport clubs Górnik: Polish for miner Zagłębie: Polish for coalfield Minero: Spanish for miner Colliery: Coal mine Shakhtar: Ukrainian for miner Than: Vietnamese for coal mine	Peru	Unión Minas
Mining	GKS: Polish for miner sport clubs Górnik: Polish for miner Zagłębie: Polish for coalfield Minero: Spanish for miner Colliery: Coal mine Shakhtar: Ukrainian for miner Than: Vietnamese for coal mine	Poland	Górnik Konin, Górnik Łęczna, Górnik Polkowice, Górnik Radlin, Górnik Wałbrzych, Górnik Wieliczka, Górnik Zabrze; GKS Bełchatów, GKS Jastrzębie, GKS Piast Gliwice, GKS Katowice, GKS Victoria Jaworzno, GKS Tychy; Zagłębie Sosnowiec, Zagłębie Lubin, Zagłębie Wałbrzych
Mining	GKS: Polish for miner sport clubs Górnik: Polish for miner Zagłębie: Polish for coalfield Minero: Spanish for miner Colliery: Coal mine Shakhtar: Ukrainian for miner Than: Vietnamese for coal mine	Russia	Gornyak Uchaly
Mining	GKS: Polish for miner sport clubs Górnik: Polish for miner Zagłębie: Polish for coalfield Minero: Spanish for miner Colliery: Coal mine Shakhtar: Ukrainian for miner Than: Vietnamese for coal mine	Slovenia	Rudar Velenje
Mining	GKS: Polish for miner sport clubs Górnik: Polish for miner Zagłębie: Polish for coalfield Minero: Spanish for miner Colliery: Coal mine Shakhtar: Ukrainian for miner Than: Vietnamese for coal mine	Soviet Union	Shakhtar Kirovsk (defunct), Shakhtar Oleksandriya (defunct)
Mining	GKS: Polish for miner sport clubs Górnik: Polish for miner Zagłębie: Polish for coalfield Minero: Spanish for miner Colliery: Coal mine Shakhtar: Ukrainian for miner Than: Vietnamese for coal mine	Uganda	Kilembe Mines
Mining	GKS: Polish for miner sport clubs Górnik: Polish for miner Zagłębie: Polish for coalfield Minero: Spanish for miner Colliery: Coal mine Shakhtar: Ukrainian for miner Than: Vietnamese for coal mine	Ukraine	Andezyt Khust (until 1992), Antratsyt Kirovske (defunct), Hirnyk Kryvyi Rih, Hirnyk Rovenky, Hirnyk-Sport Horishni Plavni, Hirnyk Pavlohrad (defunct), Hirnyk Khartsyzk (until 1992), Kremin Kremenchuk, Kryvbas Kryvyi Rih, Shakhta Ukraina Ukrainsk (defunct), Shakhtar Donetsk, Shakhtar Horlivka, Shakhtar Konotop, Shakhtar Krasnyi Luch, Shakhtar Sverdlovsk, Shakhtar Luhansk (defunct), Shakhtar Makiivka (defunct), Shakhtar Pavlohrad (until 1995), Shakhtar Stakhanov (until 2004), Uholyok Myrnohrad (defunct)
Mining	GKS: Polish for miner sport clubs Górnik: Polish for miner Zagłębie: Polish for coalfield Minero: Spanish for miner Colliery: Coal mine Shakhtar: Ukrainian for miner Than: Vietnamese for coal mine	United States	Pittsburgh Miners (defunct)
Mining	GKS: Polish for miner sport clubs Górnik: Polish for miner Zagłębie: Polish for coalfield Minero: Spanish for miner Colliery: Coal mine Shakhtar: Ukrainian for miner Than: Vietnamese for coal mine	Venezuela	Atlético Club Mineros de Guayana
Mining	GKS: Polish for miner sport clubs Górnik: Polish for miner Zagłębie: Polish for coalfield Minero: Spanish for miner Colliery: Coal mine Shakhtar: Ukrainian for miner Than: Vietnamese for coal mine	Vietnam	Than Quang Ninh
Mining	GKS: Polish for miner sport clubs Górnik: Polish for miner Zagłębie: Polish for coalfield Minero: Spanish for miner Colliery: Coal mine Shakhtar: Ukrainian for miner Than: Vietnamese for coal mine	Wales	Llay Miners Welfare
Mining	GKS: Polish for miner sport clubs Górnik: Polish for miner Zagłębie: Polish for coalfield Minero: Spanish for miner Colliery: Coal mine Shakhtar: Ukrainian for miner Than: Vietnamese for coal mine	Zambia	Konkola Mine Police
Mining	GKS: Polish for miner sport clubs Górnik: Polish for miner Zagłębie: Polish for coalfield Minero: Spanish for miner Colliery: Coal mine Shakhtar: Ukrainian for miner Than: Vietnamese for coal mine	Zimbabwe	Hwange Colliery
Navy	Malavan: Persian for Sailor; Flota: Polish for Fleet	Australia	Flinders Naval Depot (defunct)
Navy	Malavan: Persian for Sailor; Flota: Polish for Fleet	England	Portsmouth Royal Navy
Navy	Malavan: Persian for Sailor; Flota: Polish for Fleet	India	Indian Navy
Navy	Malavan: Persian for Sailor; Flota: Polish for Fleet	Iran	Malavan F.C.
Navy	Malavan: Persian for Sailor; Flota: Polish for Fleet	Pakistan	Pakistan Navy
Navy	Malavan: Persian for Sailor; Flota: Polish for Fleet	Philippines	Philippine Navy
Navy	Malavan: Persian for Sailor; Flota: Polish for Fleet	Poland	Flota Świnoujście
Navy	Malavan: Persian for Sailor; Flota: Polish for Fleet	Soviet Union	SKCF Sevastopol (defunct)
Navy	Malavan: Persian for Sailor; Flota: Polish for Fleet	Sri Lanka	Navy Sea Hawks
Navy	Malavan: Persian for Sailor; Flota: Polish for Fleet	Thailand	Navy FC
Navy	Malavan: Persian for Sailor; Flota: Polish for Fleet	Ukraine	Chayka-VMS Sevastopol (defunct)
Navy	Malavan: Persian for Sailor; Flota: Polish for Fleet	United States	Erie Commodores, Jacksonville Armada
Natural Gas	Fakel: Ukrainian for flare and stands for a gas flare.	England	Bournemouth Gasworks Athletic (defunct), Unity Gas Department (defunct)
Natural Gas	Fakel: Ukrainian for flare and stands for a gas flare.	France	Gazélec Ajaccio
Natural Gas	Fakel: Ukrainian for flare and stands for a gas flare.	India	Oil and Natural Gas Corporation FC
Natural Gas	Fakel: Ukrainian for flare and stands for a gas flare.	Pakistan	Sui Northern Gas (defunct), Sui Southern Gas (defunct)
Natural Gas	Fakel: Ukrainian for flare and stands for a gas flare.	Romania	Gaz Metan
Natural Gas	Fakel: Ukrainian for flare and stands for a gas flare.	Russia	Gazovik Orenburg (formerly), Volgar-Gazprom (formerly)
Natural Gas	Fakel: Ukrainian for flare and stands for a gas flare.	Ukraine	Fakel Varva, Fakel Ivano-Frankivsk (until 2007), Hazovyk-Khurtovyna Komarno, Hazovyk-KhGV Kharkiv
Petroleum	Naft: Persian for Petrol	Angola	Atlético Petróleos Luanda
Petroleum	Naft: Persian for Petrol	Azerbaijan	Neftchi Baku
Petroleum	Naft: Persian for Petrol	Bolivia	Oriente Petrolero
Petroleum	Naft: Persian for Petrol	Brunei	Brunei Shell Recreation Club
Petroleum	Naft: Persian for Petrol	Canada	Edmonton Drillers (defunct)
Petroleum	Naft: Persian for Petrol	Colombia	Alianza Petrolera
Petroleum	Naft: Persian for Petrol	Ecuador	Esmeraldas Petrolero
Petroleum	Naft: Persian for Petrol	Egypt	Enppi
Petroleum	Naft: Persian for Petrol	India	Oil India FC, Oil and Natural Gas Corporation FC
Petroleum	Naft: Persian for Petrol	Iran	Sanat Naft Abadan F.C.
Petroleum	Naft: Persian for Petrol	Mexico	Petroleros de Salamanca C.F.C.
Petroleum	Naft: Persian for Petrol	Romania	FC Petrolul Ploiești
Petroleum	Naft: Persian for Petrol	Russia	FC Neftekhimik Nizhnekamsk, FC Oktan Perm
Petroleum	Naft: Persian for Petrol	Soviet Union	Naftovyk Drohobych (defunct)
Petroleum	Naft: Persian for Petrol	Syria	Baniyas Refinery
Petroleum	Naft: Persian for Petrol	Trinidad and Tobago	United Petrotrin
Petroleum	Naft: Persian for Petrol	Turkey	Petrol Ofisi (defunct)
Petroleum	Naft: Persian for Petrol	Ukraine	Naftokhimik Kremenchuk, Naftovyk Dolyna, Naftovyk Okhtyrka, WFC Naftokhimik Kalush (defunct)
Petroleum	Naft: Persian for Petrol	Uzbekistan	Neftchi Fergana
Police	For football clubs affiliated with a police force. Al-Shorta: Arabic for police.	Argentina	Atlético Policial
Police	For football clubs affiliated with a police force. Al-Shorta: Arabic for police.	Bangladesh	Bangladesh Police
Police	For football clubs affiliated with a police force. Al-Shorta: Arabic for police.	Belize	Police United
Police	For football clubs affiliated with a police force. Al-Shorta: Arabic for police.	Benin	AS Police
Police	For football clubs affiliated with a police force. Al-Shorta: Arabic for police.	Botswana	Police XI
Police	For football clubs affiliated with a police force. Al-Shorta: Arabic for police.	Brunei	Royal Brunei Police Force
Police	For football clubs affiliated with a police force. Al-Shorta: Arabic for police.	Burkina Faso	AS Police
Police	For football clubs affiliated with a police force. Al-Shorta: Arabic for police.	Cambodia	Military Police
Police	For football clubs affiliated with a police force. Al-Shorta: Arabic for police.	Ecuador	Escuela Superior de Policía (ESPOLI)
Police	For football clubs affiliated with a police force. Al-Shorta: Arabic for police.	Egypt	Ittihad El Shorta
Police	For football clubs affiliated with a police force. Al-Shorta: Arabic for police.	England	Metropolitan Police, St Andrews Police Club, Stoke Gabriel & Torbay Police, West Midlands Police
Police	For football clubs affiliated with a police force. Al-Shorta: Arabic for police.	Ethiopia	Debub Police, Southern Police
Police	For football clubs affiliated with a police force. Al-Shorta: Arabic for police.	Gabon	AS Police
Police	For football clubs affiliated with a police force. Al-Shorta: Arabic for police.	Germany	Polizei SV Berlin (defunct)
Police	For football clubs affiliated with a police force. Al-Shorta: Arabic for police.	Ghana	Police Ladies
Police	For football clubs affiliated with a police force. Al-Shorta: Arabic for police.	Guyana	Guyana Police Force
Police	For football clubs affiliated with a police force. Al-Shorta: Arabic for police.	Haiti	Police Nationale d'Haïti
Police	For football clubs affiliated with a police force. Al-Shorta: Arabic for police.	India	Punjab Police
Police	For football clubs affiliated with a police force. Al-Shorta: Arabic for police.	Indonesia	Bhayangkara FC
Police	For football clubs affiliated with a police force. Al-Shorta: Arabic for police.	Iraq	Al-Shorta
Police	For football clubs affiliated with a police force. Al-Shorta: Arabic for police.	Isle of Man	Police A.F.C.
Police	For football clubs affiliated with a police force. Al-Shorta: Arabic for police.	Japan	Kyoto Prefectural Police
Police	For football clubs affiliated with a police force. Al-Shorta: Arabic for police.	Laos	Lao Police Club
Police	For football clubs affiliated with a police force. Al-Shorta: Arabic for police.	Lesotho	Lesotho Mounted Police Service
Police	For football clubs affiliated with a police force. Al-Shorta: Arabic for police.	Macau	Polícia de Segurança Pública
Police	For football clubs affiliated with a police force. Al-Shorta: Arabic for police.	Malawi	Nkhata Bay Police
Police	For football clubs affiliated with a police force. Al-Shorta: Arabic for police.	Malaysia	PDRM FA
Police	For football clubs affiliated with a police force. Al-Shorta: Arabic for police.	Mali	AS Police de Bamako
Police	For football clubs affiliated with a police force. Al-Shorta: Arabic for police.	Mauritania	ASC Police
Police	For football clubs affiliated with a police force. Al-Shorta: Arabic for police.	Niger	Association Sportive de la Police Nationale
Police	For football clubs affiliated with a police force. Al-Shorta: Arabic for police.	Nepal	Nepal Police Club
Police	For football clubs affiliated with a police force. Al-Shorta: Arabic for police.	Northern Ireland	Police Service of Northern Ireland
Police	For football clubs affiliated with a police force. Al-Shorta: Arabic for police.	Pakistan	Pakistan Police (defunct)
Police	For football clubs affiliated with a police force. Al-Shorta: Arabic for police.	Poland	Gwardia Koszalin, Gwardia Warszawa (defunct)
Police	For football clubs affiliated with a police force. Al-Shorta: Arabic for police.	Qatar	Al-Shorta (former)
Police	For football clubs affiliated with a police force. Al-Shorta: Arabic for police.	Republic of the Congo	AS Police (Brazzaville), AS Police (Pointe-Noire)
Police	For football clubs affiliated with a police force. Al-Shorta: Arabic for police.	Rwanda	Police F.C.
Police	For football clubs affiliated with a police force. Al-Shorta: Arabic for police.	Senegal	AS Police
Police	For football clubs affiliated with a police force. Al-Shorta: Arabic for police.	Singapore	Home United
Police	For football clubs affiliated with a police force. Al-Shorta: Arabic for police.	Somalia	Somali Police
Police	For football clubs affiliated with a police force. Al-Shorta: Arabic for police.	South Korea	Asan Mugunghwa
Police	For football clubs affiliated with a police force. Al-Shorta: Arabic for police.	Sri Lanka	Sri Lanka Police
Police	For football clubs affiliated with a police force. Al-Shorta: Arabic for police.	Suriname	PVV, PSV
Police	For football clubs affiliated with a police force. Al-Shorta: Arabic for police.	Syria	Al-Shorta SC
Police	For football clubs affiliated with a police force. Al-Shorta: Arabic for police.	Thailand	Police Tero
Police	For football clubs affiliated with a police force. Al-Shorta: Arabic for police.	Trinidad and Tobago	Police F.C.
Police	For football clubs affiliated with a police force. Al-Shorta: Arabic for police.	Uganda	Police FC
Police	For football clubs affiliated with a police force. Al-Shorta: Arabic for police.	Ukraine	SC Dnipro-1 (defunct)
Police	For football clubs affiliated with a police force. Al-Shorta: Arabic for police.	Vietnam	Hanoi Police
Police	For football clubs affiliated with a police force. Al-Shorta: Arabic for police.	Zambia	Konkola Mine Police
Political party		Lithuania	FK TAIP (until 2016, defunct)
Political party		Ukraine	Yednist Plysky
Porcelain		Egypt	Ceramica Cleopatra FC
Porcelain		Ukraine	Keramik Baranivka
Port	Vodnyk: Ukrainian for a waterway worker.	England	Port Vale, Port of Bristol (defunct)
Port	Vodnyk: Ukrainian for a waterway worker.	(The Gambia) Gambia	Gambia Ports Authority
Port	Vodnyk: Ukrainian for a waterway worker.	Liberia	National Port Authority Anchors
Port	Vodnyk: Ukrainian for a waterway worker.	Pakistan	Gwadar Port Authority, Karachi Port Trust (defunct)
Port	Vodnyk: Ukrainian for a waterway worker.	Scotland	Port Glasgow Athletic (defunct)
Port	Vodnyk: Ukrainian for a waterway worker.	Sierra Leone	Ports Authority
Port	Vodnyk: Ukrainian for a waterway worker.	Thailand	Port FC
Port	Vodnyk: Ukrainian for a waterway worker.	Ukraine	Portovyk Illichivsk (defunct), Portovyk Kerch (until 2005), Vodnyk Mykolaiv (defunct), Vodnyk Kherson (until 1996)
Prisons		Botswana	Prisons XI Gaborone
Prisons		Lesotho	Lesotho Correctional Services
Prisons		Uganda	Prisons FC (former)
Prisons		Zambia	Prison Leopards (former)
Public works		Bangladesh	Public Works Department
Public works		Belarus	Kommunalnik Slonim (defunct), Kommunalnik Chist (until 2006), Kommunalnik Pinsk (until 1996), Kommunalnik Svetlogorsk (until 2000), Kommunalnik Zhlobin (until 2008)
Public works		Bhutan	Public Works Department (defunct)
Public works		Russia	Kommunalnik Ulan-Ude (until 2011)
Public works		Soviet Union	Kommunalnik Novopolotsk (until 1990)
Public works		Ukraine	Komunalnyk Luhansk (defunct)
Pulp and paper industry		England	Cambridge University Press, Cray Valley Paper Mills, London Paper Mills (defunct)
Pulp and paper industry		Pakistan	Sindh Government Press
Pulp and paper industry		Ukraine	Papirnyk Malyn (defunct)
Railroad workers	For Eastern European teams, indicates that the team was originally part of the Soviet Lokomotiv sport society or an equivalent. Rah Ahan (|Persian), Al Sekka Al Hadid: Arabic for railway, Ferro Carril (Spanish), for Railroad. Ferroviário (Portuguese) for Railroad. The "CFR" in CFR Cluj is Căile Ferate Române, the Romanian state railway system. Vasutas means "railroad worker" in Hungarian, Kigwancha means "locomotive" in Korean, Demir means "iron" in Turkish. KKS (Polish) for railway sport clubs. The IRT denotes the Interborough Rapid Transit Company, which was bought by the government of New York City to form part of the New York City Subway.	Angola	Ferroviário de Huambo, Ferroviário de Huíla, Ferroviário de Luanda
Railroad workers		Argentina	Ferro Carril Oeste, Central Córdoba de Rosario, Central Córdoba de Santiago del Estero, Instituto Atlético Central Córdoba, Club Atlético Talleres (Córdoba), Buenos Aires and Rosario Railway (defunct)
Railroad workers		Armenia	FC Lokomotiv Yerevan (defunct)
Railroad workers		Australia	Lokomotiv Cove
Railroad workers		Azerbaijan	Lokomotiv-Bilajary FK (defunct)
Railroad workers		Bangladesh	Bangladesh Railway
Railroad workers		Belarus	Lokomotiv Gomel (former)
Railroad workers		Botswana	Mahalapye Railway Highlanders
Railroad workers		Brazil	Desportiva Ferroviária, Ferroviária, Ferroviária (Assis), Ferroviária (Botucatu), Ferroviária (Pindamonhangaba), Ferroviário (AL) (defunct), Ferroviário (CE), Ferroviário (MA), Ferroviário (PR) (defunct), Ferroviário do Recife (defunct), Ferroviário (RO), Ferroviário-ST, Operário Ferroviário
Railroad workers		Bosnia and Herzegovina	FK Željezničar Sarajevo
Railroad workers		Bulgaria	Lokomotiv Gorna Oryahovitsa, Lokomotiv Plovdiv, Lokomotiv Sofia
Railroad workers		Chile	Club Deportivo Ferroviarios
Railroad workers		China	Lokomotiv Tianjin
Railroad workers		Croatia	Lokomotiva Zagreb
Railroad workers		Czech Republic	FK Loko Prague
Railroad workers		Egypt	Al Sekka Al Hadid
Railroad workers		England	Newton Heath LYR, Birmingham Corporation Tramways (defunct), Darlington Railway Athletic, Derby Midland (defunct), Eastleigh LSWR (defunct), Harrogate Railway Athletic, Lincoln Moorlands Railway, Retford Rail, Wolverton LNWR (defunct)
Railroad workers		Estonia	Jõhvi FC Lokomotiv (former)
Railroad workers		Germany	1. FC Lokomotive Leipzig
Railroad workers		(Georgia (country)) Georgia	Locomotive Tbilisi
Railroad workers		Hungary	Debreceni Vasutas Sport Klub
Railroad workers		India	Bengal Nagpur Railway, Eastern Railway, South-East-Central Railway
Railroad workers		Iran	Rah Ahan
Railroad workers		Kazakhstan	Lokomotiv Astana
Railroad workers		Moldova	Locomotiva Bălți
Railroad workers		Mozambique	Ferroviário da Beira, Ferroviário de Maputo, Ferroviário de Nacala, Ferroviário de Nampula, Ferroviário de Pemba, Ferroviário de Quelimane
Railroad workers		North Korea	Kigwancha Sports Club
Railroad workers		North Macedonia	FK Lokomotiva Skopje
Railroad workers		Norway	Lokomotiv Oslo
Railroad workers		Pakistan	Pakistan Railways
Railroad workers		Poland	Lech Poznań
Railroad workers		Republic of Ireland	Dundalk GNR, Midland Athletic (defunct)
Railroad workers		Romania	CFR Cluj
Railroad workers		Russia	Lokomotiv Moscow, Lokomotiv Liski, Lokomotiv NN, Lokomotiv Chita (formerly)
Railroad workers		Scotland	Inverurie Loco Works, Caledonian Locomotives (defunct)
Railroad workers		Slovakia	Lokomotíva Košice
Railroad workers		Soviet Union	Lokomotyv Donetsk (defunct), Lokomotyv Kharkiv (defunct), Lokomotyv Kherson (until 1975), Lokomotyv Vinnytsia (until 1979)
Railroad workers		Tajikistan	FC Lokomotiv-Pamir
Railroad workers		Tunisia	Sfax Railway Sport
Railroad workers		Turkey	Adana Demirspor, Ankara Demirspor, Eskişehir Demirspor, İzmir Demirspor
Railroad workers		Ukraine	Lokomotyv Kyiv, Lokomotyv Dvorichna (defunct), Lokomotyv Smila (defunct)
Railroad workers		Uruguay	Central Uruguay Railway Cricket Club (defunct)
Railroad workers		United States	Carolina RailHawks (former), El Paso Locomotive, IRT Rangers (defunct), New York IRT (defunct)
Railroad workers		Uzbekistan	Lokomotiv Tashkent
Shipbuilding	Spanish: Club Atleta de los Astilleros del Nervión, lit. 'Athletic Club of the Nervión Shipyards'	England	Cammell Laird 1907, Goole Shipyards (defunct), Hook Shipyards (defunct)
Shipbuilding	Spanish: Club Atleta de los Astilleros del Nervión, lit. 'Athletic Club of the Nervión Shipyards'	Guam	Guam Shipyard
Shipbuilding	Spanish: Club Atleta de los Astilleros del Nervión, lit. 'Athletic Club of the Nervión Shipyards'	Northern Ireland	Harland & Wolff Welders
Shipbuilding	Spanish: Club Atleta de los Astilleros del Nervión, lit. 'Athletic Club of the Nervión Shipyards'	Poland	SKS Stoczniowiec Gdańsk
Shipbuilding	Spanish: Club Atleta de los Astilleros del Nervión, lit. 'Athletic Club of the Nervión Shipyards'	Scotland	Burntisland Shipyard
Shipbuilding	Spanish: Club Atleta de los Astilleros del Nervión, lit. 'Athletic Club of the Nervión Shipyards'	Spain	Club Atleta de los Astilleros del Nervión (defunct)
Shipbuilding	Spanish: Club Atleta de los Astilleros del Nervión, lit. 'Athletic Club of the Nervión Shipyards'	South Korea	Ulsan Mipo Dockyard
Shipbuilding	Spanish: Club Atleta de los Astilleros del Nervión, lit. 'Athletic Club of the Nervión Shipyards'	Ukraine	Sudnobudivnyk Mykolaiv (until 1992), Sudnobudivnyk Mykolaiv (2016) (defunct)
Shipbuilding	Spanish: Club Atleta de los Astilleros del Nervión, lit. 'Athletic Club of the Nervión Shipyards'	United States	Brooklyn Morse Dry Dock (defunct) Brooklyn Robins Dry Dock (defunct), Philadelphia Merchant Ship (defunct), Tebo Yacht Basin (defunct), Todd Shipyards (defunct)
Textile	Nassaji: Persian for Textile Industry Farr Alpaca Company ran two separate clubs: the earlier amateur Farr Alpaca F.C. and the later professional Holyoke Falcos.	Albania	Tekstilisti Stalin (defunct)
Textile	Nassaji: Persian for Textile Industry Farr Alpaca Company ran two separate clubs: the earlier amateur Farr Alpaca F.C. and the later professional Holyoke Falcos.	Argentina	Textil Mandiyú
Textile	Nassaji: Persian for Textile Industry Farr Alpaca Company ran two separate clubs: the earlier amateur Farr Alpaca F.C. and the later professional Holyoke Falcos.	Bangladesh	Team Bangladesh Jute Mills Corporation
Textile	Nassaji: Persian for Textile Industry Farr Alpaca Company ran two separate clubs: the earlier amateur Farr Alpaca F.C. and the later professional Holyoke Falcos.	Croatia	NK Varteks
Textile	Nassaji: Persian for Textile Industry Farr Alpaca Company ran two separate clubs: the earlier amateur Farr Alpaca F.C. and the later professional Holyoke Falcos.	Egypt	Ghazl El-Mehalla
Textile	Nassaji: Persian for Textile Industry Farr Alpaca Company ran two separate clubs: the earlier amateur Farr Alpaca F.C. and the later professional Holyoke Falcos.	Ethiopia	Cotton Factory Club
Textile	Nassaji: Persian for Textile Industry Farr Alpaca Company ran two separate clubs: the earlier amateur Farr Alpaca F.C. and the later professional Holyoke Falcos.	India	Jagatjit Cotton and Textile FC (defunct)
Textile	Nassaji: Persian for Textile Industry Farr Alpaca Company ran two separate clubs: the earlier amateur Farr Alpaca F.C. and the later professional Holyoke Falcos.	Mozambique	Grupo Desportivo da Companhia Têxtil do Punguè
Textile	Nassaji: Persian for Textile Industry Farr Alpaca Company ran two separate clubs: the earlier amateur Farr Alpaca F.C. and the later professional Holyoke Falcos.	Pakistan	Crescent Textile Mills (defunct)
Textile	Nassaji: Persian for Textile Industry Farr Alpaca Company ran two separate clubs: the earlier amateur Farr Alpaca F.C. and the later professional Holyoke Falcos.	Russia	Tekstilshchik Ivanovo, Tekstilshchik Kamyshin
Textile	Nassaji: Persian for Textile Industry Farr Alpaca Company ran two separate clubs: the earlier amateur Farr Alpaca F.C. and the later professional Holyoke Falcos.	Ukraine	Khutrovyk Tysmenytsia, Fetrovyk Khust (until 1995), Tekstylnyk Dunaivtsi (until 1992), WFC Tekstylnyk Donetsk (until 1994)
Textile	Nassaji: Persian for Textile Industry Farr Alpaca Company ran two separate clubs: the earlier amateur Farr Alpaca F.C. and the later professional Holyoke Falcos.	United States	Farr Alpaca F.C. (defunct), Holyoke Falcos (defunct), Sayles Finishing Plant (defunct)
Tractor manufacturing	Silmash stands for agricultural machinery	Belarus	FC Traktor Minsk
Tractor manufacturing	Silmash stands for agricultural machinery	England	Massey Ferguson
Tractor manufacturing	Silmash stands for agricultural machinery	Iran	Tractor Sazi F.C.
Tractor manufacturing	Silmash stands for agricultural machinery	Republic of Ireland	Fordsons (defunct)
Tractor manufacturing	Silmash stands for agricultural machinery	Romania	Tractorul Brașov (defunct)
Tractor manufacturing	Silmash stands for agricultural machinery	Russia	Rotor Volgograd
Tractor manufacturing	Silmash stands for agricultural machinery	Soviet Union	Silmash Kharkiv (defunct), Silmash Lviv (defunct), Traktor Kharkiv (until 1948), Traktor Kirovohrad (until 1953)
Tractor manufacturing	Silmash stands for agricultural machinery	Ukraine	Silmash Kolomyia (defunct)
Tractor manufacturing	Silmash stands for agricultural machinery	Uzbekistan	FK Traktor Tashkent
Water industry		England	Yorkshire Water Authority (Southern) F.C.
Water industry		Nigeria	Kwara State Water Corporation F.C.
Water industry		Pakistan	Water and Power Development Authority
Whaling		United States	New Bedford Whalers (defunct)

=== Education ===
NB: Football clubs associated with colleges and universities in the United States and Canada are not listed here. These clubs are not independent of the school, and are divisions within a much larger school sports program.

Topic	Meaning	Country	Clubs
Academic	Affiliation with academics.	Bulgaria	Akademik Sofia
Academic	Affiliation with academics.	Democratic Republic of the Congo	Académic Club Rangers
Academic	Affiliation with academics.	Denmark	Akademisk Boldklub
Academic	Affiliation with academics.	England	Academic Club London (defunct)
Academic	Affiliation with academics.	Jersey	Sporting Academics
Academic	Affiliation with academics.	Moldova	FC Academia Chișinău
Academic	Affiliation with academics.	Portugal	Académica da Amadora, Académica de Coimbra, Académico do Porto, Académico de Viseu
Academic	Affiliation with academics.	Romania	Academica Clinceni (until 2022)
Academic	Affiliation with academics.	Russia	Sportakademklub Moscow
Academic	Affiliation with academics.	Scotland	Hamilton Academical F.C.
Academic	Affiliation with academics.	Timor-Leste	AS Académica
Academic	Affiliation with academics.	Ukraine	Nafkom-Akademia Irpin (until 2004)
College	Affiliation with a college institution.	Bangladesh	ARB College
College	Affiliation with a college institution.	Bhutan	Royal Thimphu College
College	Affiliation with a college institution.	Brazil	Associação Atlética Mackenzie College (defunct)
College	Affiliation with a college institution.	England	Schorne College F.C. (defunct), St John's College (York) F.C. (defunct)
College	Affiliation with a college institution.	Gibraltar	College 1975
College	Affiliation with a college institution.	Laos	Lao-American College
College	Affiliation with a college institution.	Malawi	Malawi Armed Forces College
College	Affiliation with a college institution.	North Korea	North Hwanghae Provincial College of Physical Education
College	Affiliation with a college institution.	Pakistan	Punjab Medical College (defunct)
College	Affiliation with a college institution.	Peru	ADC Juan Pablo II College
College	Affiliation with a college institution.	Republic of Ireland	College Corinthians, University College Cork, University College Dublin
College	Affiliation with a college institution.	South Africa	Maluti FET College
College	Affiliation with a college institution.	Thailand	Bangkok Christian College (defunct)
Education	Generic affiliation with education.	Bhutan	Education FC (defunct)
Education	Generic affiliation with education.	Pakistan	Higher Education Commission
Education	Generic affiliation with education.	Ukraine	Osvita Kyiv (until 2006)
Polytechnic	Affiliation with a polytechnical institution.	Denmark	Polyteknisk Boldklub
Polytechnic	Affiliation with a polytechnical institution.	Ecuador	C.D. Politécnico
Polytechnic	Affiliation with a polytechnical institution.	England	Polytechnic F.C., Leeds Polytechnic (defunct), Thames Polytechnic (defunct)
Polytechnic	Affiliation with a polytechnical institution.	Finland	Polyteknikkojen urheiluseura
Polytechnic	Affiliation with a polytechnical institution.	Lesotho	Lerotholi Polytechnic
Polytechnic	Affiliation with a polytechnical institution.	Moldova	Politehnica Chișinău
Polytechnic	Affiliation with a polytechnical institution.	Romania	Politehnica Iași, Politehnica Timișoara
School		England	Forest School
School		Grenada	Grenada Boys' Secondary School FC
School		Japan	Tokiwagi Gakuen High School LSC
School		Uganda	Kirinya–Jinja Senior Secondary School FC (former)
Students	Affiliation with students.	Argentina	Estudiantes de La Plata
Students	Affiliation with students.	Denmark	Fredericia Studenternes Kricketklub
Students	Affiliation with students.	India	Rising Students Club
Students	Affiliation with students.	Peru	Estudiantes de Medicina
Students	Affiliation with students.	Mexico	Estudiantes Tecos
Students	Affiliation with students.	Romania	Sportul Studențesc București
Teaching		England	Sunderland and District Teachers (former)
Teaching		Japan	Miyazaki Teachers (defunct), Tochigi Teachers' (former), Tottori Teachers' (former), Yamaguchi Prefecture Teachers (former)
Teaching		Nigeria	Jos University Teaching Hospital
University	Affiliation with a university institution.		
University	Affiliation with a university institution.	Albania	Universiteti Europian i Tiranës
University	Affiliation with a university institution.	Argentina	Juventud Unida Universitario
University	Affiliation with a university institution.	Barbados	UWI Blackbirds
University	Affiliation with a university institution.	Belarus	Universitet Vitebsk
University	Affiliation with a university institution.	Bolivia	Universidad Cruceña, Universitario de Sucre
University	Affiliation with a university institution.	Chile	Universidad Católica, Universidad de Chile, Universidad de Concepción
University	Affiliation with a university institution.	Djibouti	Bahache/Université de Djibouti
University	Affiliation with a university institution.	Ecuador	LDU Quito, C.D. Universidad Católica
University	Affiliation with a university institution.	Ethiopia	Welwalo Adigrat University
University	Affiliation with a university institution.	Finland	Aalto University
University	Affiliation with a university institution.	France	Paris Université Club
University	Affiliation with a university institution.	Guatemala	Universidad de San Carlos
University	Affiliation with a university institution.	Honduras	Pumas UNAH
University	Affiliation with a university institution.	Indonesia	Cordova University
University	Affiliation with a university institution.	Israel	ASA Tel Aviv University
University	Affiliation with a university institution.	Laos	National University of Laos
University	Affiliation with a university institution.	Malaysia	UiTM, UKM, USM
University	Affiliation with a university institution.	Mexico	Estudiantes Tecos, Pumas UNAM, Tigres UANL
University	Affiliation with a university institution.	Mozambique	Universidade Pedagógica de Manica
University	Affiliation with a university institution.	Myanmar	Myanmar University
University	Affiliation with a university institution.	Namibia	University of Namibia
University	Affiliation with a university institution.	New Zealand	University-Mount Wellington
University	Affiliation with a university institution.	Nicaragua	Deportivo Universidad Centroamericana, UNAN Managua
University	Affiliation with a university institution.	Nigeria	Jos University Teaching Hospital
University	Affiliation with a university institution.	Northern Ireland	Queen's University Belfast
University	Affiliation with a university institution.	Pakistan	University Grants Commission
University	Affiliation with a university institution.	Panama	Club Deportivo Universitario
University	Affiliation with a university institution.	Papua New Guinea	University Inter
University	Affiliation with a university institution.	Peru	Universitario de Deportes
University	Affiliation with a university institution.	Poland	KU AZS UJ Kraków
University	Affiliation with a university institution.	Republic of Ireland	Dublin University, University College Cork, University College Dublin
University	Affiliation with a university institution.	Romania	CS Universitatea Craiova, Universitatea Cluj
University	Affiliation with a university institution.	South Africa	University of Pretoria
University	Affiliation with a university institution.	Spain	UCAM Murcia, Universidad de Las Palmas (defunct), Universidad de Oviedo
University	Affiliation with a university institution.	Thailand	Bangkok University Deffo, North Bangkok University
University	Affiliation with a university institution.	Turkey	Gazi Üniversitesispor
University	Affiliation with a university institution.	Uganda	Victoria University
University	Affiliation with a university institution.	Ukraine	HU ZIDMU-Spartak Zaporizhzhia (defunct)

== Days and dates ==
Topic	Meaning	Country	Clubs
Age of the city	Clubs named after the age of city when the clubs were established	Ukraine	Zvyahel-750 Novohrad-Volynskyi, Tyras-2500 Bilhorod-Dnistrovskyi (until 2018)
Days of the week	Clubs named after a specific day of the week	England	Sheffield Wednesday, South Kirkby Wednesday, Thursday Wanderers (defunct)
Days of the week	Clubs named after a specific day of the week	Wales	Abergavenny Thursdays
DPRK army establishment Day	Both dates are considered the days of the establishment of the North Korean military, created on April 25, 1932 as a guerrilla army, and on February 8, 1948 as the army of the country	North Korea	April 25 SC, February 8 Sports Club
Independence Day	Clubs named after the day of independence of the country or city	Argentina	Nueve de Julio, Nueve de Julio de Morteros, Nueve de Julio de Río Tercero (9 July)
Independence Day	Clubs named after the day of independence of the country or city	Portugal	1º Dezembro (1 December)
International Workers' Day		Angola	Estrela Clube Primeiro de Maio
International Workers' Day		Portugal	Associação Naval 1º de Maio (defunct)
Year of city founding	Clubs named after the year of city establishment (clubs are listed in chronological order by country).	Canada	1812 FC Barrie (defunct)
Year of city founding	Clubs named after the year of city establishment (clubs are listed in chronological order by country).	United States	FC Baltimore 1729 (defunct), Reno 1868 FC (defunct), Oklahoma City 1889
Year of establishment	Club names containing a reference to the year in which the club was established (clubs are listed in chronological order by country).	Albania	Luzi 2008
Year of establishment	Club names containing a reference to the year in which the club was established (clubs are listed in chronological order by country).	Australia	Sydney United 58, Bathurst '75
Year of establishment	Club names containing a reference to the year in which the club was established (clubs are listed in chronological order by country).	Austria	First Vienna FC 1894, FC Dornbirn 1913, Salzburger AK 1914, SC-ESV Parndorf 1919
Year of establishment	Club names containing a reference to the year in which the club was established (clubs are listed in chronological order by country).	Bosnia and Herzegovina	SFK 2000
Year of establishment	Club names containing a reference to the year in which the club was established (clubs are listed in chronological order by country).	Bulgaria	Pirin 1922 (defunct), Volov 1929 Shumen
Year of establishment	Club names containing a reference to the year in which the club was established (clubs are listed in chronological order by country).	Cameroon	Douala Athletic Club 2000
Year of establishment	Club names containing a reference to the year in which the club was established (clubs are listed in chronological order by country).	Canada	Vancouver 86ers
Year of establishment	Club names containing a reference to the year in which the club was established (clubs are listed in chronological order by country).	Croatia	HNK Vukovar '91 (defunct)
Year of establishment	Club names containing a reference to the year in which the club was established (clubs are listed in chronological order by country).	Cyprus	Frenaros FC 2000
Year of establishment	Club names containing a reference to the year in which the club was established (clubs are listed in chronological order by country).	Czech Republic	Bohemians 1905
Year of establishment	Club names containing a reference to the year in which the club was established (clubs are listed in chronological order by country).	Denmark	B.93, B.1903, B.1908, B.1909, B.1913, B.1972, FA 2000
Year of establishment	Club names containing a reference to the year in which the club was established (clubs are listed in chronological order by country).	England	Darlington 1883, Enfield 1893, Cammell Laird 1907, The 61, Walthamstow Avenue 2000 (defunct)
Year of establishment	Club names containing a reference to the year in which the club was established (clubs are listed in chronological order by country).	Estonia	Jõgeva SK Noorus-96
Year of establishment	Club names containing a reference to the year in which the club was established (clubs are listed in chronological order by country).	Faroe Islands	B36 Tórshavn
Year of establishment	Club names containing a reference to the year in which the club was established (clubs are listed in chronological order by country).	Finland	PK-35, Sepsi-78
Year of establishment	Club names containing a reference to the year in which the club was established (clubs are listed in chronological order by country).	(Georgia (country)) Georgia	FC Kolkheti-1913 Poti
Year of establishment	Club names containing a reference to the year in which the club was established (clubs are listed in chronological order by country).	Germany	1860 Munich, 1899 Hoffenheim, Bayer 04 Leverkusen, BVB 09, Darmstadt 98, Eintracht Bamberg 2010, Eintracht Duisburg 1848, Hannover 96, Schalke 04
Year of establishment	Club names containing a reference to the year in which the club was established (clubs are listed in chronological order by country).	Greece	Tyrnavos 2005
Year of establishment	Club names containing a reference to the year in which the club was established (clubs are listed in chronological order by country).	Greenland	K-33, T-41, SN-43, G-44, N-48, B67, S-68, I-69, CIF-70, IT-79, UB-83, N-85
Year of establishment	Club names containing a reference to the year in which the club was established (clubs are listed in chronological order by country).	Gibraltar	Manchester 62 F.C., College 1975, F.C. Olympique 13
Year of establishment	Club names containing a reference to the year in which the club was established (clubs are listed in chronological order by country).	Indonesia	Persikabo 1973, UMS 1905, Perkesa '78 (defunct), Persebaya 1927 (formerly)
Year of establishment	Club names containing a reference to the year in which the club was established (clubs are listed in chronological order by country).	Italy	Fanfulla 1874 (until 2016), Ascoli Calcio 1898, Bari 1908 (until 2018), Bologna FC 1909, Reggiana 1919, FC Bolzano 1996
Year of establishment	Club names containing a reference to the year in which the club was established (clubs are listed in chronological order by country).	Japan	Tokyo Verdy 1969
Year of establishment	Club names containing a reference to the year in which the club was established (clubs are listed in chronological order by country).	Latvia	FK Tukums 2000
Year of establishment	Club names containing a reference to the year in which the club was established (clubs are listed in chronological order by country).	Luxembourg	Mamer 32, Wiltz 71, Erpeldange 72, F91 Dudelange, Rodange 91, Schifflange 95, UN Käerjéng 97, CeBra 01 (defunct), Alliance 01 (defunct), Norden 02, Differdange 03, Union 05 Kayl-Tétange
Year of establishment	Club names containing a reference to the year in which the club was established (clubs are listed in chronological order by country).	Mauritius	AS Port-Louis 2000
Year of establishment	Club names containing a reference to the year in which the club was established (clubs are listed in chronological order by country).	Netherlands	Be Quick 1887, Blauw Geel '38, Sportlust '46, Fortuna '54, ODIN '59, AZ '67, FC Dordrecht
Year of establishment	Club names containing a reference to the year in which the club was established (clubs are listed in chronological order by country).	New Zealand	FC Twenty 11
Year of establishment	Club names containing a reference to the year in which the club was established (clubs are listed in chronological order by country).	Norway	SK Djerv 1919
Year of establishment	Club names containing a reference to the year in which the club was established (clubs are listed in chronological order by country).	Philippines	Mendiola F.C. 1991
Year of establishment	Club names containing a reference to the year in which the club was established (clubs are listed in chronological order by country).	Poland	Pogoń 1945 Staszów
Year of establishment	Club names containing a reference to the year in which the club was established (clubs are listed in chronological order by country).	Portugal	C.D. Portalegrense 1925
Year of establishment	Club names containing a reference to the year in which the club was established (clubs are listed in chronological order by country).	Romania	CFR 1907 Cluj, FC Farul Constanța 1920, FC Rapid 1923, FC Dinamo 1948 București, FC Vaslui 2002, SC Corvinul 2005 Hunedoara, ASA 2013 Târgu Mureș (defunct)
Year of establishment	Club names containing a reference to the year in which the club was established (clubs are listed in chronological order by country).	Russia	FC Krasnodar-2000 (defunct)
Year of establishment	Club names containing a reference to the year in which the club was established (clubs are listed in chronological order by country).	Scotland	Gretna F.C. 2008
Year of establishment	Club names containing a reference to the year in which the club was established (clubs are listed in chronological order by country).	Serbia	FK Arsenal 1930
Year of establishment	Club names containing a reference to the year in which the club was established (clubs are listed in chronological order by country).	Slovenia	ND Mura 05
Year of establishment	Club names containing a reference to the year in which the club was established (clubs are listed in chronological order by country).	Spain	CD Belchite 97
Year of establishment	Club names containing a reference to the year in which the club was established (clubs are listed in chronological order by country).	Sweden	FC Rosengård 1917
Year of establishment	Club names containing a reference to the year in which the club was established (clubs are listed in chronological order by country).	Switzerland	FC St. Gallen 1879, FC Basel 1893, FC Thun 1898, FC Wil 1900
Year of establishment	Club names containing a reference to the year in which the club was established (clubs are listed in chronological order by country).	Ukraine	Dnipro-75 Dnipropetrovsk, Frunzenets-Liha-99 Sumy (defunct), FC Boyarka-2006 (until 2006)
Year of establishment	Club names containing a reference to the year in which the club was established (clubs are listed in chronological order by country).	United States	Madison 56ers, Legacy 76
Year of establishment of the original clubs	Names of some phoenix clubs refers to the year of establishment of the original club	Bulgaria	Chernomorets 1919 Burgas, CSKA 1948 Sofia, Etar 1924 Veliko Tarnovo, FC Shumen 1929 (defunct)
Year of establishment of the original clubs	Names of some phoenix clubs refers to the year of establishment of the original club	England	1874 Northwich
Year of establishment of the original clubs	Names of some phoenix clubs refers to the year of establishment of the original club	Indonesia	Persika 1951
Year of establishment of the original clubs	Names of some phoenix clubs refers to the year of establishment of the original club	Italy	Parma Calcio 1913
Year of establishment of the original clubs	Names of some phoenix clubs refers to the year of establishment of the original club	Portugal	Associação Naval 1893, Aves 1930, Felgueiras 1932 (until 2024), Marco 09, Salgueiros 08 (until 2015)
Year of establishment of the original clubs	Names of some phoenix clubs refers to the year of establishment of the original club	Romania	F.C. Argeș 1953 (defunct)
Year of establishment of the original clubs	Names of some phoenix clubs refers to the year of establishment of the original club	Slovenia	NK Šmartno 1928
Year of establishment of the original clubs	Names of some phoenix clubs refers to the year of establishment of the original club	Turkey	Bucaspor 1928
Year of establishment of the original clubs	Names of some phoenix clubs refers to the year of establishment of the original club	Ukraine	Metalist 1925 Kharkiv, Skala 1911 Stryi
Year of establishment of the original clubs	Names of some phoenix clubs refers to the year of establishment of the original club	Wales	C.P.D. Y Rhyl 1879, Bangor City 1876

== Specific origins of club ==
Topic	Meaning	Country	Clubs
Great Chicago Fire	Officially founded on 8 October 1997, the 126th anniversary of this pivotal event in the history of Chicago.	United States	Chicago Fire FC
Heart of Midlothian	Named for a dance hall, itself named for a novel by Walter Scott and a reference to the city of Edinburgh, located in the centre of Midlothian county	Scotland	Heart of Midlothian
Homeless	Nomads, Rangers, Rovers, Wanderers. Excursionistas translates roughly as "The Voyagers". Often (but not always) originally a team without a home ground.	Andorra	FC Rànger's
Homeless	Nomads, Rangers, Rovers, Wanderers. Excursionistas translates roughly as "The Voyagers". Often (but not always) originally a team without a home ground.	Argentina	Excursionistas
Homeless	Nomads, Rangers, Rovers, Wanderers. Excursionistas translates roughly as "The Voyagers". Often (but not always) originally a team without a home ground.	Australia	Albion Rovers, Balgownie Rangers, Mount Druitt Town Rangers, Western Sydney Wanderers
Homeless	Nomads, Rangers, Rovers, Wanderers. Excursionistas translates roughly as "The Voyagers". Often (but not always) originally a team without a home ground.	Bangladesh	Dhaka Rangers, Dhaka Wanderers Club
Homeless	Nomads, Rangers, Rovers, Wanderers. Excursionistas translates roughly as "The Voyagers". Often (but not always) originally a team without a home ground.	Bermuda	BAA Wanderers, Southampton Rangers, West End Rovers
Homeless	Nomads, Rangers, Rovers, Wanderers. Excursionistas translates roughly as "The Voyagers". Often (but not always) originally a team without a home ground.	Botswana	Morupule Wanderers
Homeless	Nomads, Rangers, Rovers, Wanderers. Excursionistas translates roughly as "The Voyagers". Often (but not always) originally a team without a home ground.	Brazil	Scottish Wanderers (defunct)
Homeless	Nomads, Rangers, Rovers, Wanderers. Excursionistas translates roughly as "The Voyagers". Often (but not always) originally a team without a home ground.	Brunei	Kota Ranger
Homeless	Nomads, Rangers, Rovers, Wanderers. Excursionistas translates roughly as "The Voyagers". Often (but not always) originally a team without a home ground.	Canada	Calgary Rangers, HFX Wanderers, Simcoe County Rovers
Homeless	Nomads, Rangers, Rovers, Wanderers. Excursionistas translates roughly as "The Voyagers". Often (but not always) originally a team without a home ground.	Chile	Rangers de Talca, Santiago Wanderers
Homeless	Nomads, Rangers, Rovers, Wanderers. Excursionistas translates roughly as "The Voyagers". Often (but not always) originally a team without a home ground.	Democratic Republic of the Congo	Académic Club Rangers
Homeless	Nomads, Rangers, Rovers, Wanderers. Excursionistas translates roughly as "The Voyagers". Often (but not always) originally a team without a home ground.	Dominica	Harlem Rovers
Homeless	Nomads, Rangers, Rovers, Wanderers. Excursionistas translates roughly as "The Voyagers". Often (but not always) originally a team without a home ground.	England	Abbey Rangers, Blackburn Rovers, Bolton Wanderers, Brighton Rangers, Bristol Rovers, Central Park Rangers, Concord Rangers, Cullompton Rangers, Deeping Rangers, Doncaster Rovers, Forest Green Rovers, Hall Road Rangers, Hertfordshire Rangers (defunct), Highfield Rangers, Kintbury Rangers, Northampton Sileby Rangers, Northern Nomads, Paget Rangers, Queens Park Rangers, Risborough Rangers, Smethwick Rangers, Soham Town Rangers, Stafford Rangers, Sutton Common Rovers, Tranmere Rovers, Thurnby Rangers (until 2008), Wanderers, Winterton Rangers, Wolverhampton Wanderers, Wycombe Wanderers
Homeless	Nomads, Rangers, Rovers, Wanderers. Excursionistas translates roughly as "The Voyagers". Often (but not always) originally a team without a home ground.	Eswatini	Manzini Wanderers, Mhlambanyatsi Rovers
Homeless	Nomads, Rangers, Rovers, Wanderers. Excursionistas translates roughly as "The Voyagers". Often (but not always) originally a team without a home ground.	France	The White Rovers (defunct)
Homeless	Nomads, Rangers, Rovers, Wanderers. Excursionistas translates roughly as "The Voyagers". Often (but not always) originally a team without a home ground.	Ghana	Union Rovers
Homeless	Nomads, Rangers, Rovers, Wanderers. Excursionistas translates roughly as "The Voyagers". Often (but not always) originally a team without a home ground.	Grenada	Queens Park Rangers
Homeless	Nomads, Rangers, Rovers, Wanderers. Excursionistas translates roughly as "The Voyagers". Often (but not always) originally a team without a home ground.	Guam	Rovers FC
Homeless	Nomads, Rangers, Rovers, Wanderers. Excursionistas translates roughly as "The Voyagers". Often (but not always) originally a team without a home ground.	Guernsey	Belgrave Wanderers F.C., Guernsey Rangers F.A.C., Guernsey Rovers A.C.
Homeless	Nomads, Rangers, Rovers, Wanderers. Excursionistas translates roughly as "The Voyagers". Often (but not always) originally a team without a home ground.	Hong Kong	Hong Kong Rangers
Homeless	Nomads, Rangers, Rovers, Wanderers. Excursionistas translates roughly as "The Voyagers". Often (but not always) originally a team without a home ground.	Ireland	Leinster Nomads (defunct)
Homeless	Nomads, Rangers, Rovers, Wanderers. Excursionistas translates roughly as "The Voyagers". Often (but not always) originally a team without a home ground.	Jersey	Jersey Wanderers, Rozel Rovers
Homeless	Nomads, Rangers, Rovers, Wanderers. Excursionistas translates roughly as "The Voyagers". Often (but not always) originally a team without a home ground.	Kenya	Posta Rangers
Homeless	Nomads, Rangers, Rovers, Wanderers. Excursionistas translates roughly as "The Voyagers". Often (but not always) originally a team without a home ground.	Liberia	Jasmine Rangers
Homeless	Nomads, Rangers, Rovers, Wanderers. Excursionistas translates roughly as "The Voyagers". Often (but not always) originally a team without a home ground.	Malawi	Mighty Wanderers
Homeless	Nomads, Rangers, Rovers, Wanderers. Excursionistas translates roughly as "The Voyagers". Often (but not always) originally a team without a home ground.	Malta	Sliema Wanderers, Żebbuġ Rangers, Żebbuġ Rovers
Homeless	Nomads, Rangers, Rovers, Wanderers. Excursionistas translates roughly as "The Voyagers". Often (but not always) originally a team without a home ground.	Mauritius	Arsenal Wanderers
Homeless	Nomads, Rangers, Rovers, Wanderers. Excursionistas translates roughly as "The Voyagers". Often (but not always) originally a team without a home ground.	New Zealand	Hamilton Wanderers, Miramar Rangers, Napier City Rovers, Northern Rovers, Rangers (defunct), Wanderers SC (defunct), West Coast Rangers
Homeless	Nomads, Rangers, Rovers, Wanderers. Excursionistas translates roughly as "The Voyagers". Often (but not always) originally a team without a home ground.	Nigeria	Enugu Rangers
Homeless	Nomads, Rangers, Rovers, Wanderers. Excursionistas translates roughly as "The Voyagers". Often (but not always) originally a team without a home ground.	Northern Ireland	Ards Rangers, Ballymacash Rangers, Bangor Rangers, Bryansburn Rangers, Carrick Rangers, Glebe Rangers, Killymoon Rangers, Lisburn Rangers, Newington Rangers, Rathfern Rangers, Rathfriland Rangers
Homeless	Nomads, Rangers, Rovers, Wanderers. Excursionistas translates roughly as "The Voyagers". Often (but not always) originally a team without a home ground.	Philippines	Manila Nomads
Homeless	Nomads, Rangers, Rovers, Wanderers. Excursionistas translates roughly as "The Voyagers". Often (but not always) originally a team without a home ground.	Republic of Ireland	Bray Wanderers, Shamrock Rovers, Sligo Rovers
Homeless	Nomads, Rangers, Rovers, Wanderers. Excursionistas translates roughly as "The Voyagers". Often (but not always) originally a team without a home ground.	Saint Lucia	Rovers United
Homeless	Nomads, Rangers, Rovers, Wanderers. Excursionistas translates roughly as "The Voyagers". Often (but not always) originally a team without a home ground.	Scotland	Albion Rovers, Arniston Rangers, Berwick Rangers, Brora Rangers, Cambuslang Rangers, Cove Rangers, Cowdenbeath Rangers (until 1881), Dundee Wanderers, Kilsyth Rangers, Kilwinning Rangers, Raith Rovers, Rangers
Homeless	Nomads, Rangers, Rovers, Wanderers. Excursionistas translates roughly as "The Voyagers". Often (but not always) originally a team without a home ground.	Sierra Leone	Kakua Rangers, Murray Town Rovers
Homeless	Nomads, Rangers, Rovers, Wanderers. Excursionistas translates roughly as "The Voyagers". Often (but not always) originally a team without a home ground.	Singapore	Admiralty Rangers, Tampines Rovers, Sembawang Rangers
Homeless	Nomads, Rangers, Rovers, Wanderers. Excursionistas translates roughly as "The Voyagers". Often (but not always) originally a team without a home ground.	South Africa	Graneker Rangers (defunct)
Homeless	Nomads, Rangers, Rovers, Wanderers. Excursionistas translates roughly as "The Voyagers". Often (but not always) originally a team without a home ground.	Trinidad and Tobago	La Horquetta Rangers
Homeless	Nomads, Rangers, Rovers, Wanderers. Excursionistas translates roughly as "The Voyagers". Often (but not always) originally a team without a home ground.	United States	Brooklyn Wanderers (defunct), Boston Shamrock Rovers (defunct), Derby City Rovers (defunct), San Diego Nomads (defunct), Swope Park Rangers (until 2019)
Homeless	Nomads, Rangers, Rovers, Wanderers. Excursionistas translates roughly as "The Voyagers". Often (but not always) originally a team without a home ground.	United States Virgin Islands	Rovers SC
Homeless	Nomads, Rangers, Rovers, Wanderers. Excursionistas translates roughly as "The Voyagers". Often (but not always) originally a team without a home ground.	Uruguay	Montevideo Wanderers
Homeless	Nomads, Rangers, Rovers, Wanderers. Excursionistas translates roughly as "The Voyagers". Often (but not always) originally a team without a home ground.	Wales	Albion Rovers, Bargod Rangers, Bradley Park Rangers (defunct), Bwlch Rangers, Connah's Quay Nomads, Cwm Wanderers, Ely Rangers, Newtown Wanderers (defunct), Penrhiwceiber Rangers, Quar Park Rangers (defunct), Rhosgoch Rangers (defunct), Ruabon Rovers, Waterloo Rovers
Homeless	Nomads, Rangers, Rovers, Wanderers. Excursionistas translates roughly as "The Voyagers". Often (but not always) originally a team without a home ground.	Zambia	Forest Rangers, Mufulira Wanderers
United	Often (but not always) refers to the result of a merger. Eintracht: German for United. Eendracht: Dutch for United. Ittihad: Arabic for United.	Argentina	Unión de Santa Fe, Unión de Mar del Plata, Unión de Sunchales
United	Often (but not always) refers to the result of a merger. Eintracht: German for United. Eendracht: Dutch for United. Ittihad: Arabic for United.	Australia	Adelaide United, Canberra United, Gold Coast United, Newcastle United Jets, Western United
United	Often (but not always) refers to the result of a merger. Eintracht: German for United. Eendracht: Dutch for United. Ittihad: Arabic for United.	Austria	Eintracht Wels (formerly)
United	Often (but not always) refers to the result of a merger. Eintracht: German for United. Eendracht: Dutch for United. Ittihad: Arabic for United.	(The Bahamas) Bahamas	United F.C.
United	Often (but not always) refers to the result of a merger. Eintracht: German for United. Eendracht: Dutch for United. Ittihad: Arabic for United.	Bahrain	Al-Ittihad (Bahrain)
United	Often (but not always) refers to the result of a merger. Eintracht: German for United. Eendracht: Dutch for United. Ittihad: Arabic for United.	Barbados	Pinelands United
United	Often (but not always) refers to the result of a merger. Eintracht: German for United. Eendracht: Dutch for United. Ittihad: Arabic for United.	Belgium	S.C. Eendracht Aalst (defunct)
United	Often (but not always) refers to the result of a merger. Eintracht: German for United. Eendracht: Dutch for United. Ittihad: Arabic for United.	Botswana	Nico United
United	Often (but not always) refers to the result of a merger. Eintracht: German for United. Eendracht: Dutch for United. Ittihad: Arabic for United.	Brazil	União Frederiquense, União Mogi, União São João
United	Often (but not always) refers to the result of a merger. Eintracht: German for United. Eendracht: Dutch for United. Ittihad: Arabic for United.	Cameroon	Victoria United
United	Often (but not always) refers to the result of a merger. Eintracht: German for United. Eendracht: Dutch for United. Ittihad: Arabic for United.	Canada	Victoria United
United	Often (but not always) refers to the result of a merger. Eintracht: German for United. Eendracht: Dutch for United. Ittihad: Arabic for United.	Cayman Islands	East End United, Roma United
United	Often (but not always) refers to the result of a merger. Eintracht: German for United. Eendracht: Dutch for United. Ittihad: Arabic for United.	China	Shanghai United (defunct)
United	Often (but not always) refers to the result of a merger. Eintracht: German for United. Eendracht: Dutch for United. Ittihad: Arabic for United.	Dominica	Harlem United
United	Often (but not always) refers to the result of a merger. Eintracht: German for United. Eendracht: Dutch for United. Ittihad: Arabic for United.	England	AFC Telford United, Boston United, Cambridge United, Carlisle United, Chesham United, Colchester United, Ebbsfleet United, Hartlepool United, Leeds United, Maidenhead United, Maidstone United, Manchester United, Newcastle United, Oxford United, Peterborough United, Rotherham United, Scunthorpe United, Sheffield United, Southend United, Sutton United, Telford United (defunct), Torquay United, West Ham United
United	Often (but not always) refers to the result of a merger. Eintracht: German for United. Eendracht: Dutch for United. Ittihad: Arabic for United.	Egypt	Al-Ittihad (Alexandria), Ittihad El Shorta
United	Often (but not always) refers to the result of a merger. Eintracht: German for United. Eendracht: Dutch for United. Ittihad: Arabic for United.	Finland	Tampere United
United	Often (but not always) refers to the result of a merger. Eintracht: German for United. Eendracht: Dutch for United. Ittihad: Arabic for United.	France	United SC (defunct)
United	Often (but not always) refers to the result of a merger. Eintracht: German for United. Eendracht: Dutch for United. Ittihad: Arabic for United.	Germany	Eintracht Altona (defunct), Eintracht Bad Kreuznach, Eintracht Bamberg 2010, Eintracht Baunatal, Eintracht 01 Berlin (defunct), Eintracht Braunschweig, Eintracht Dortmund, Eintracht Duisburg 1848, Eintracht Frankfurt, Eintracht Mahlsdorf, Eintracht Norderstedt 03, Eintracht Nordhorn (defunct), Eintracht Recklinghausen (defunct), Eintracht Rheine, Eintracht Schwerin (formerly), Eintracht Stadtallendorf, Eintracht Trier, Eintracht Wetzlar, Eintracht Glas-Chemie Wirges
United	Often (but not always) refers to the result of a merger. Eintracht: German for United. Eendracht: Dutch for United. Ittihad: Arabic for United.	Gibraltar	Gibraltar United (defunct), Glacis United
United	Often (but not always) refers to the result of a merger. Eintracht: German for United. Eendracht: Dutch for United. Ittihad: Arabic for United.	Guyana	Buxton United
United	Often (but not always) refers to the result of a merger. Eintracht: German for United. Eendracht: Dutch for United. Ittihad: Arabic for United.	India	Madhya Pradesh United
United	Often (but not always) refers to the result of a merger. Eintracht: German for United. Eendracht: Dutch for United. Ittihad: Arabic for United.	Indonesia	Bali United, Madura United, Gresik United, Karo United
United	Often (but not always) refers to the result of a merger. Eintracht: German for United. Eendracht: Dutch for United. Ittihad: Arabic for United.	Iraq	Al-Ittihad (Iraq)
United	Often (but not always) refers to the result of a merger. Eintracht: German for United. Eendracht: Dutch for United. Ittihad: Arabic for United.	Jamaica	Montego Bay United, Portmore United, Rivoli United
United	Often (but not always) refers to the result of a merger. Eintracht: German for United. Eendracht: Dutch for United. Ittihad: Arabic for United.	Japan	JEF United Ichihara Chiba, Kagoshima United, Kochi United
United	Often (but not always) refers to the result of a merger. Eintracht: German for United. Eendracht: Dutch for United. Ittihad: Arabic for United.	Jersey	First Tower United
United	Often (but not always) refers to the result of a merger. Eintracht: German for United. Eendracht: Dutch for United. Ittihad: Arabic for United.	Jordan	Ittihad Al-Ramtha, Ittihad Al-Zarqa
United	Often (but not always) refers to the result of a merger. Eintracht: German for United. Eendracht: Dutch for United. Ittihad: Arabic for United.	Kenya	F.C. West Ham United
United	Often (but not always) refers to the result of a merger. Eintracht: German for United. Eendracht: Dutch for United. Ittihad: Arabic for United.	Laos	Evo United, Lanexang United, Salavan United
United	Often (but not always) refers to the result of a merger. Eintracht: German for United. Eendracht: Dutch for United. Ittihad: Arabic for United.	Latvia	Riga United
United	Often (but not always) refers to the result of a merger. Eintracht: German for United. Eendracht: Dutch for United. Ittihad: Arabic for United.	Liberia	Nimba United
United	Often (but not always) refers to the result of a merger. Eintracht: German for United. Eendracht: Dutch for United. Ittihad: Arabic for United.	Libya	Al-Ittihad (Gheryan), Al-Ittihad (Misurata), Al-Ittihad (Tripoli)
United	Often (but not always) refers to the result of a merger. Eintracht: German for United. Eendracht: Dutch for United. Ittihad: Arabic for United.	Malawi	Chitipa United
United	Often (but not always) refers to the result of a merger. Eintracht: German for United. Eendracht: Dutch for United. Ittihad: Arabic for United.	Malaysia	Melaka United, Sarawak United
United	Often (but not always) refers to the result of a merger. Eintracht: German for United. Eendracht: Dutch for United. Ittihad: Arabic for United.	Mexico	Los Cabos United
United	Often (but not always) refers to the result of a merger. Eintracht: German for United. Eendracht: Dutch for United. Ittihad: Arabic for United.	Myanmar	Shan United, Ayeyawady United, Hanthawaddy United, Rakhine United, Sagaing United
United	Often (but not always) refers to the result of a merger. Eintracht: German for United. Eendracht: Dutch for United. Ittihad: Arabic for United.	New Zealand	Central United, Christchurch United, South Island United
United	Often (but not always) refers to the result of a merger. Eintracht: German for United. Eendracht: Dutch for United. Ittihad: Arabic for United.	Nigeria	Rivers United
United	Often (but not always) refers to the result of a merger. Eintracht: German for United. Eendracht: Dutch for United. Ittihad: Arabic for United.	Northern Ireland	Annagh United, Ballinamallard United, Ballymena United
United	Often (but not always) refers to the result of a merger. Eintracht: German for United. Eendracht: Dutch for United. Ittihad: Arabic for United.	Oman	Al-Ittihad (Salalah)
United	Often (but not always) refers to the result of a merger. Eintracht: German for United. Eendracht: Dutch for United. Ittihad: Arabic for United.	Palestine	Al Ittihad SC (Nablus)
United	Often (but not always) refers to the result of a merger. Eintracht: German for United. Eendracht: Dutch for United. Ittihad: Arabic for United.	Papua New Guinea	PS United
United	Often (but not always) refers to the result of a merger. Eintracht: German for United. Eendracht: Dutch for United. Ittihad: Arabic for United.	Portugal	União Futebol Comércio e Indústria, União de Leiria, União Desportiva Oliveirense, União de Santarém, União de Tomar, União de Coimbra, União de Lamas
United	Often (but not always) refers to the result of a merger. Eintracht: German for United. Eendracht: Dutch for United. Ittihad: Arabic for United.	Republic of Ireland	Galway United, Drogheda United, Waterford United
United	Often (but not always) refers to the result of a merger. Eintracht: German for United. Eendracht: Dutch for United. Ittihad: Arabic for United.	Saint Kitts and Nevis	Newtown United, St. Paul's United, United Old Road Jets
United	Often (but not always) refers to the result of a merger. Eintracht: German for United. Eendracht: Dutch for United. Ittihad: Arabic for United.	Saint Lucia	Ciceron Seagulls United, Northern United All Stars, Rovers United, Square United
United	Often (but not always) refers to the result of a merger. Eintracht: German for United. Eendracht: Dutch for United. Ittihad: Arabic for United.	Samoa	AST Central United, Moaula United
United	Often (but not always) refers to the result of a merger. Eintracht: German for United. Eendracht: Dutch for United. Ittihad: Arabic for United.	Saudi Arabia	Al-Ittihad (Jeddah)
United	Often (but not always) refers to the result of a merger. Eintracht: German for United. Eendracht: Dutch for United. Ittihad: Arabic for United.	Scotland	Ayr United, Dundee United
United	Often (but not always) refers to the result of a merger. Eintracht: German for United. Eendracht: Dutch for United. Ittihad: Arabic for United.	Solomon Islands	Southern United, Western United
United	Often (but not always) refers to the result of a merger. Eintracht: German for United. Eendracht: Dutch for United. Ittihad: Arabic for United.	South Korea	Incheon United, Seoul United
United	Often (but not always) refers to the result of a merger. Eintracht: German for United. Eendracht: Dutch for United. Ittihad: Arabic for United.	Sudan	Al-Ittihad (Wad Madani)
United	Often (but not always) refers to the result of a merger. Eintracht: German for United. Eendracht: Dutch for United. Ittihad: Arabic for United.	Suriname	West United
United	Often (but not always) refers to the result of a merger. Eintracht: German for United. Eendracht: Dutch for United. Ittihad: Arabic for United.	Sweden	Växjö United
United	Often (but not always) refers to the result of a merger. Eintracht: German for United. Eendracht: Dutch for United. Ittihad: Arabic for United.	Switzerland	FC United Zürich
United	Often (but not always) refers to the result of a merger. Eintracht: German for United. Eendracht: Dutch for United. Ittihad: Arabic for United.	Syria	Al-Ittihad Ahli (Aleppo)
United	Often (but not always) refers to the result of a merger. Eintracht: German for United. Eendracht: Dutch for United. Ittihad: Arabic for United.	Tanzania	Albino United
United	Often (but not always) refers to the result of a merger. Eintracht: German for United. Eendracht: Dutch for United. Ittihad: Arabic for United.	Thailand	Buriram United, Chiangrai United, Muangthong United
United	Often (but not always) refers to the result of a merger. Eintracht: German for United. Eendracht: Dutch for United. Ittihad: Arabic for United.	Timor-Leste	Lalenok United
United	Often (but not always) refers to the result of a merger. Eintracht: German for United. Eendracht: Dutch for United. Ittihad: Arabic for United.	Tonga	Lotohaʻapai United
United	Often (but not always) refers to the result of a merger. Eintracht: German for United. Eendracht: Dutch for United. Ittihad: Arabic for United.	Tuvalu	Lakena United
United	Often (but not always) refers to the result of a merger. Eintracht: German for United. Eendracht: Dutch for United. Ittihad: Arabic for United.	Uganda	Busoga United
United	Often (but not always) refers to the result of a merger. Eintracht: German for United. Eendracht: Dutch for United. Ittihad: Arabic for United.	United Arab Emirates	Gulf United
United	Often (but not always) refers to the result of a merger. Eintracht: German for United. Eendracht: Dutch for United. Ittihad: Arabic for United.	United States	D.C. United, Atlanta United FC, Minnesota United FC, S.C. Eintracht
United	Often (but not always) refers to the result of a merger. Eintracht: German for United. Eendracht: Dutch for United. Ittihad: Arabic for United.	United States Virgin Islands	United We Stand SC
United	Often (but not always) refers to the result of a merger. Eintracht: German for United. Eendracht: Dutch for United. Ittihad: Arabic for United.	Wales	Pontypridd United
United	Often (but not always) refers to the result of a merger. Eintracht: German for United. Eendracht: Dutch for United. Ittihad: Arabic for United.	Yemen	Al-Ittihad (Ibb)

== Ethnic, social, national or religious background ==
Topic	Meaning	Country	Clubs
Abbey	An abbey is a type of monastery used by members of a religious order.	England	Abbey Rangers, Reading Abbey (defunct)
Albinism	Albinism is characterized in humans by the partial or complete absence of pigment in the skin, hair and eyes. Many people with albinism are persecuted.	Tanzania	Albino United
Albion	Archaic name for Great Britain	Australia	Albion Rovers
Albion	Archaic name for Great Britain	Brazil	C.A. Albion (defunct)
Albion	Archaic name for Great Britain	England	Brighton & Hove Albion, Burton Albion, West Bromwich Albion, Witton Albion
Albion	Archaic name for Great Britain	Northern Ireland	Moira Albion
Albion	Archaic name for Great Britain	Scotland	Albion Rovers, Stirling Albion
Albion	Archaic name for Great Britain	United States	Albion San Diego
Albion	Archaic name for Great Britain	Uruguay	Albion F.C.
Albion	Archaic name for Great Britain	Wales	Albion Rovers, Ynyshir Albions
Arabi	Al-Arabi: Arabic for "Arab".	Jordan	Al-Arabi (Jordan)
Arabi	Al-Arabi: Arabic for "Arab".	Kuwait	Al-Arabi SC (Kuwait)
Arabi	Al-Arabi: Arabic for "Arab".	Qatar	Al-Arabi SC (Qatar)
Argentina		Argentina	Argentinos Juniors, Argentino de Junín, Argentino de Rosario, Argentino de Quilmes, Sociedad Sportiva Argentina (defunct), CD Bangladesh Argentina
Argentina		Canada	North York Atletico Argentina
Armenia	Mostly clubs founded by and for members of the Armenian diaspora.	Argentina	Club Deportivo Armenio
Armenia	Mostly clubs founded by and for members of the Armenian diaspora.	Armenia	FC Ararat-Armenia
Armenia	Mostly clubs founded by and for members of the Armenian diaspora.	France	Association Sportive Arménienne, Association Sportive d'Origine Arménienne de Valence (defunct)
Armenia	Mostly clubs founded by and for members of the Armenian diaspora.	Iran	Armenian Sports Club (defunct)
Asturias	Clubs founded by and for members of the Asturian diaspora.	Mexico	Asturias F.C. (defunct), Club Futbol Asturias de Puebla
Assyria	Clubs founded by and for members of the Assyrian diaspora.	Sweden	Assyriska FF, Assyriska BK, Assyriska IK, Assyriska Föreningen i Norrköping (defunct), Assyriska FF Babylon, Azech Syrianska Föreningen (defunct), FC Syrianska, Valsta Syrianska
Austria	Before 2005, RB Salzburg was known as Austria Salzburg.	Austria	Austria Kärnten (defunct), Austria Kärnten (2007-2010) (defunct), Austria Klagenfurt, Austria Lustenau, Austria Wien, Austria Salzburg, RB Salzburg (formerly), Austria Vösendorf (formerly)
Bavaria	Bayern: German for Bavaria.	Germany	Bavaria 1899 München (defunct), Bayern Alzenau, Bayern Dresden (defunct), Bayern Hof, Bayern Munich
Bavaria	Bayern: German for Bavaria.	Mexico	Bavaria Tultitlán (defunct)
Bavaria	Bayern: German for Bavaria.	Mongolia	Bavarians FC
Bavaria	Bayern: German for Bavaria.	United States	Milwaukee Bavarian SC, New York Hota Bavarian
Balkans	Refers to the Balkan Peninsula and local ethnic groups (notably Bulgarian and ex-Yugoslavian).	Bulgaria	Balkan Botevgrad
Balkans	Refers to the Balkan Peninsula and local ethnic groups (notably Bulgarian and ex-Yugoslavian).	North Macedonia	FK Balkan Skopje
Balkans	Refers to the Balkan Peninsula and local ethnic groups (notably Bulgarian and ex-Yugoslavian).	Serbia	FK Balkan Mirijevo
Balkans	Refers to the Balkan Peninsula and local ethnic groups (notably Bulgarian and ex-Yugoslavian).	Sweden	FBK Balkan
Balkans	Refers to the Balkan Peninsula and local ethnic groups (notably Bulgarian and ex-Yugoslavian).	Ukraine	Balkany Zorya
Bangladesh	Clubs founded by and for members of the Bangladeshi diaspora.	Argentina	CD Bangladesh Argentina
Bangladesh	Clubs founded by and for members of the Bangladeshi diaspora.	Palau	Team Bangladesh F.C.
Beitar	Refers to Betar, for "Brit Yosef Trumpeldor", a Zionist youth movement founded in 1923.	Israel	Beitar Jerusalem, Beitar Tel Aviv Bat Yam F.C., Beitar Nes Tubruk F.C.
Bengal		England	Sporting Bengal United
Bengal		India	Bengal Mumbai FC (defunct)
Bohemians	Bohemians Praha are the only exception of this list, being named after the region of Bohemia.	Czech Republic	FC Bohemians Praha
Bohemians	Bohemians Praha are the only exception of this list, being named after the region of Bohemia.	Philippines	Bohemian S.C.
Bohemians	Bohemians Praha are the only exception of this list, being named after the region of Bohemia.	Republic of Ireland	Bohemian F.C., Cork Bohemians (defunct)
Bohemians	Bohemians Praha are the only exception of this list, being named after the region of Bohemia.	United States	Baltimore Bohemians (defunct), Bohemian Queens (defunct)
Brandenburg		Germany	Brandenburger SC Süd 05, Brandenburg Berlin (formerly, defunct), Brandenburger SV Cottbus-Ost, FC Brandenburg Dresden (defunct), SV Brandenburg 01 Dresden (defunct)
Britain	Mostly clubs founded by and for members of the British diaspora.	Mexico	British Club (defunct)
Britain	Mostly clubs founded by and for members of the British diaspora.	Russian Empire	Odesa British Athletic Club (defunct)
Britain	Mostly clubs founded by and for members of the British diaspora.	United States	Washington British Lions (defunct)
Burgundy	Bourgogne: French for Burgundy. Burgund: German for Burgundy.	France	Montceau Bourgogne
Burgundy	Bourgogne: French for Burgundy. Burgund: German for Burgundy.	Germany	Berliner FC Burgund (defunct)
Caledonian		Australia	Bassendean Caledonians
Caledonian		Canada	Edmonton Caledonians
Caledonian		England	London Caledonians (defunct)
Caledonian		Scotland	Inverness Caledonian Thistle, Elgin Caledonian (defunct)
Caledonian		South Africa	Germiston Caledonian (defunct)
Caledonian		United States	Paterson Caledonian (defunct)
Canada	Mostly clubs founded by and for members of the Canadian diaspora.	Canada	Sudbury Canadians, Vancouver Royal Canadians (defunct)
Canada	Mostly clubs founded by and for members of the Canadian diaspora.	United States	Chicago Canadian Club (defunct)
Canada	Mostly clubs founded by and for members of the Canadian diaspora.	Uruguay	Canadian Soccer Club
Carinthia	Kärnten: German for Carinthia.	Austria	Austria Kärnten (defunct), Austria Kärnten (2007-2010) (defunct), Carinthians Soccer Women
Celtic	Mostly clubs founded by and for members of the Irish diaspora. The name of Celta de Vigo did not come from an Irish diaspora, but was instead inspired by the ancient Celtic presence in the club's home region of Galicia.	Australia	Alice Springs Celtic
Celtic	Mostly clubs founded by and for members of the Irish diaspora. The name of Celta de Vigo did not come from an Irish diaspora, but was instead inspired by the ancient Celtic presence in the club's home region of Galicia.	Canada	Celtix du Haut-Richelieu, Gloucester Celtic
Celtic	Mostly clubs founded by and for members of the Irish diaspora. The name of Celta de Vigo did not come from an Irish diaspora, but was instead inspired by the ancient Celtic presence in the club's home region of Galicia.	England	Farsley Celtic, Stalybridge Celtic, Walker Celtic, West Allotment Celtic
Celtic	Mostly clubs founded by and for members of the Irish diaspora. The name of Celta de Vigo did not come from an Irish diaspora, but was instead inspired by the ancient Celtic presence in the club's home region of Galicia.	Ireland	Derry Celtic (defunct)
Celtic	Mostly clubs founded by and for members of the Irish diaspora. The name of Celta de Vigo did not come from an Irish diaspora, but was instead inspired by the ancient Celtic presence in the club's home region of Galicia.	Northern Ireland	Donegal Celtic, Lurgan Celtic, Belfast Celtic (1891–1960), Belfast Celtic (1978–)
Celtic	Mostly clubs founded by and for members of the Irish diaspora. The name of Celta de Vigo did not come from an Irish diaspora, but was instead inspired by the ancient Celtic presence in the club's home region of Galicia.	Republic of Ireland	Cork Celtic, Wayside Celtic
Celtic	Mostly clubs founded by and for members of the Irish diaspora. The name of Celta de Vigo did not come from an Irish diaspora, but was instead inspired by the ancient Celtic presence in the club's home region of Galicia.	Scotland	Celtic, Blantyre Celtic (defunct), Inverness Celtic (defunct)
Celtic	Mostly clubs founded by and for members of the Irish diaspora. The name of Celta de Vigo did not come from an Irish diaspora, but was instead inspired by the ancient Celtic presence in the club's home region of Galicia.	South Africa	Bloemfontein Celtic
Celtic	Mostly clubs founded by and for members of the Irish diaspora. The name of Celta de Vigo did not come from an Irish diaspora, but was instead inspired by the ancient Celtic presence in the club's home region of Galicia.	Spain	Celta de Vigo
Celtic	Mostly clubs founded by and for members of the Irish diaspora. The name of Celta de Vigo did not come from an Irish diaspora, but was instead inspired by the ancient Celtic presence in the club's home region of Galicia.	Turks and Caicos Islands	Celtic FC Providenciales
Celtic	Mostly clubs founded by and for members of the Irish diaspora. The name of Celta de Vigo did not come from an Irish diaspora, but was instead inspired by the ancient Celtic presence in the club's home region of Galicia.	United States	Brooklyn Celtic, Kearny Celtic (defunct), San Francisco Celtic, Celtic FC America (defunct)
Celtic	Mostly clubs founded by and for members of the Irish diaspora. The name of Celta de Vigo did not come from an Irish diaspora, but was instead inspired by the ancient Celtic presence in the club's home region of Galicia.	Wales	Cwmbran Celtic, Talysarn Celts
Celtic	Mostly clubs founded by and for members of the Irish diaspora. The name of Celta de Vigo did not come from an Irish diaspora, but was instead inspired by the ancient Celtic presence in the club's home region of Galicia.	Zambia	Kafue Celtic
Chanka	Ethnic group living in Pre-Columbian South America	Peru	Club Deportivo Los Chankas
Chile	Clubs founded by and for members of the Chilean diaspora.	Australia	The New Chilean Football Club
Chile	Clubs founded by and for members of the Chilean diaspora.	Canada	Chile Lindo (defunct)
Christianity		England	Fire United Christian (defunct)
Christianity		New Zealand	Christian Youth (formerly)
Constantinople	Clubs founded by Greek refugees that fled from Constantinople after the Greco-Turkish War	Greece	AEK, PAOK
Croatia	Clubs founded by and for members of the Croatian diaspora.	Australia	Adelaide Croatia Soccer Club, SC Croatia, Sydney Croatia, North Perth Croatia (see list)
Croatia	Clubs founded by and for members of the Croatian diaspora.	Canada	Hamilton Croatia, Toronto Croatia, Welland Lions Croatia (defunct)
Croatia	Clubs founded by and for members of the Croatian diaspora.	Croatia	HNK Đakovo Croatia, NK Croatia Đakovo (defunct), NK Croatia Zmijavci
Croatia	Clubs founded by and for members of the Croatian diaspora.	Germany	SD Croatia Berlin
Croatia	Clubs founded by and for members of the Croatian diaspora.	Sweden	Kroatiska Föreningen Velebit
Croatia	Clubs founded by and for members of the Croatian diaspora.	United States	Croatian Eagles, HNNK Hrvat Chicago, Los Angeles Croatia (defunct), Chicago Croatian (defunct)
England	Mostly clubs founded by and for members of the English diaspora.	Germany	Dresden English Football Club (defunct)
England	Mostly clubs founded by and for members of the English diaspora.	Italy	Anglo-Palermitan Athletic and Foot-Ball Club
England	Mostly clubs founded by and for members of the English diaspora.	Spain	Club Inglés Bella Vista
England	Mostly clubs founded by and for members of the English diaspora.	Switzerland	Anglo-American Club Zürich (defunct)
Europa		Gibraltar	Europa F.C.
Europa		Panama	A.F.C. Euro Kickers
Europa		Romania	Europa Alba Iulia
Europa		Spain	CE Europa
Europa		United States	F.A. Euro
France	Mostly clubs founded by and for members of the French diaspora.	France	Racing Club de France, Club Français (defunct), Stade Français
France	Mostly clubs founded by and for members of the French diaspora.	Mexico	L'Amicale Française (defunct)
Galicia		Brazil	Galícia E.C.
Galicia		England	Deportivo Galicia
Galicia		Spain	SDC Galicia de Mugardos, Club Galicia de El Ferrol (defunct)
Galicia		United States	Galicia (defunct)
Galicia		Venezuela	Galicia de Aragua (defunct)
Gaul	Gaul (Latin: Gallia) was a region of Western Europe first clearly described by the Romans, encompassing present-day Belgium, France, Luxembourg, and parts of Germany, Netherlands, Northern Italy and Switzerland.	France	Gallia Club Paris (defunct), Gallia Football Athlétic Club (defunct), Gallia Club Grasse (defunct)
Germany	Includes alternative names of Germany like Germania, Alemannia, Teutonia. Deutschland: German for Germany.	Australia	Germania (formerly)
Germany	Includes alternative names of Germany like Germania, Alemannia, Teutonia. Deutschland: German for Germany.	Brazil	SC Germânia (formerly)
Germany	Includes alternative names of Germany like Germania, Alemannia, Teutonia. Deutschland: German for Germany.	Canada	London German Canadians
Germany	Includes alternative names of Germany like Germania, Alemannia, Teutonia. Deutschland: German for Germany.	Germany	Alemannia Aachen, Alemannia Haibach, Alemannia Waldalgesheim, Berliner FC Alemannia 1890, Berliner FC Alemannia 22 (defunct), FC Alemannia 1897 Karlsruhe (defunct), Berliner FuCC Deutschland (defunct), Deutschland Wilhelmshaven (formerly), Berliner FC Germania 1888, DFC Germania Prag (defunct), Germania Bieber, Germania Bietigheim (Baden), Germania Bietigheim (Württemberg), Germania Bochum (defunct), Germania Braunschweig (defunct), Germania Bremen (defunct), Germania Breslau (defunct), Germania Brötzingen (defunct), 1. FC Germania Egestorf/Langreder, Germania Elberfeld (defunct), VfL Germania 1894, Germania Friedrichstal, Germania Halberstadt, SC Germania 1887 (defunct), FC Germania Kalk (defunct), Germania Kattowitz (defunct), Germania Königshütte (formerly), Mannheimer FG Germania 1897 (defunct), Germania 1899 Mülhausen (formerly), 1. FC Germania 08 Ober-Roden, Germania Schöneiche, Germania 06 Schwanheim, Germania Teveren, Germania Wiesbaden, Germania Windeck, Germania 1907 Wuppertal, Teutonia Berlin (defunct), Teutonia Ottensen, Teutonia Watzenborn-Steinberg (formerly), Kieler SV Holstein von 1900
Germany	Includes alternative names of Germany like Germania, Alemannia, Teutonia. Deutschland: German for Germany.	Finland	Germania Helsinki
Germany	Includes alternative names of Germany like Germania, Alemannia, Teutonia. Deutschland: German for Germany.	Mexico	Germania F.V. (defunct)
Germany	Includes alternative names of Germany like Germania, Alemannia, Teutonia. Deutschland: German for Germany.	Uruguay	Sport Club Teutonia (defunct)
Greece	Greek: Ελλάς, romanized: Hellas Greek: Πανελλήνιος, romanized: Panellinios, lit. 'Pan-Hellenic'	Australia	Hellenic Athletic, Pan-Hellenic, South Melbourne Hellas, West Adelaide Hellas (see list)
Greece	Greek: Ελλάς, romanized: Hellas Greek: Πανελλήνιος, romanized: Panellinios, lit. 'Pan-Hellenic'	Canada	SC Hellas
Greece	Greek: Ελλάς, romanized: Hellas Greek: Πανελλήνιος, romanized: Panellinios, lit. 'Pan-Hellenic'	Egypt	Athletic Union of Greek Alexandria, Football Club of Greeks of Alexandria
Greece	Greek: Ελλάς, romanized: Hellas Greek: Πανελλήνιος, romanized: Panellinios, lit. 'Pan-Hellenic'	Germany	SpVgg Hellas-Nordwest 04 (defunct)
Greece	Greek: Ελλάς, romanized: Hellas Greek: Πανελλήνιος, romanized: Panellinios, lit. 'Pan-Hellenic'	Greece	Panellinios G.S.
Greece	Greek: Ελλάς, romanized: Hellas Greek: Πανελλήνιος, romanized: Panellinios, lit. 'Pan-Hellenic'	Italy	Hellas Verona
Greece	Greek: Ελλάς, romanized: Hellas Greek: Πανελλήνιος, romanized: Panellinios, lit. 'Pan-Hellenic'	South Africa	Hellenic F.C.
Greece	Greek: Ελλάς, romanized: Hellas Greek: Πανελλήνιος, romanized: Panellinios, lit. 'Pan-Hellenic'	Sweden	Panellinios IF
Greece	Greek: Ελλάς, romanized: Hellas Greek: Πανελλήνιος, romanized: Panellinios, lit. 'Pan-Hellenic'	Turkey	Greek Football Team (formerly)
Greece	Greek: Ελλάς, romanized: Hellas Greek: Πανελλήνιος, romanized: Panellinios, lit. 'Pan-Hellenic'	United States	Greek American AA, New York Greeks, Tampa Bay Hellenic
Guaraní	Name of a group of culturally related indigenous peoples of South America.	Argentina	Guaraní Antonio Franco
Guaraní	Name of a group of culturally related indigenous peoples of South America.	Brazil	Guarani FC, Guarany FC
Guaraní	Name of a group of culturally related indigenous peoples of South America.	Paraguay	Club Guaraní
Hakoah	Hebrew: הכח, romanized: The Strength	Argentina	Club Náutico Hacoaj
Hakoah	Hebrew: הכח, romanized: The Strength	Australia	Hakoah Sydney City East FC, Melbourne Hakoah (defunct)
Hakoah	Hebrew: הכח, romanized: The Strength	Austria	Hakoah Vienna
Hakoah	Hebrew: הכח, romanized: The Strength	Germany	Hakoah Berlin (defunct)
Hakoah	Hebrew: הכח, romanized: The Strength	Israel	Hakoah Amidar Ramat Gan F.C.
Hakoah	Hebrew: הכח, romanized: The Strength	Latvia	Hakoah Riga (defunct)
Hakoah	Hebrew: הכח, romanized: The Strength	Switzerland	FC Hakoah
Hakoah	Hebrew: הכח, romanized: The Strength	United States	Brooklyn Hakoah (defunct), Hakoah All-Stars (defunct), New York Hakoah (defunct)
Harp	Mostly clubs founded by and for members of the Irish diaspora.	Republic of Ireland	Finn Harps
Harp	Mostly clubs founded by and for members of the Irish diaspora.	Scotland	Dumbarton Harp (defunct), Dundee Harp (defunct), Maryhill Harp (defunct)
Hibernia	Clubs founded by and for members of the Irish diaspora.	Malta	Hibernians
Hibernia	Clubs founded by and for members of the Irish diaspora.	Republic of Ireland	Cork Hibernians (defunct)
Hibernia	Clubs founded by and for members of the Irish diaspora.	Scotland	Dundee Hibernian, Duntocher Hibernian, Hibernian, Maryhill Hibernians
Hibernia	Clubs founded by and for members of the Irish diaspora.	United States	Philadelphia Hibernian (defunct)
Hibernia	Clubs founded by and for members of the Irish diaspora.	Wales	Wrexham Hibernians (defunct)
Hollandia	Mostly clubs founded by and for members of the Dutch diaspora.	Australia	Hollandia-Inala Soccer Club
Hollandia	Mostly clubs founded by and for members of the Dutch diaspora.	Netherlands	HVV Hollandia, Hollandia Victoria Combinatie (defunct)
Holstein		Germany	Holstein Kiel, Holstein Quickborn, Holstein Segeberg (defunct)
Homenetmen & Homenmen	pan-Armenian sports and Scouting organization	Lebanon	Homenetmen Beirut F.C., Homenmen Beirut
Homenetmen & Homenmen	pan-Armenian sports and Scouting organization	Syria	Homenetmen Aleppo Club
Honduras		Honduras	Honduras Progreso, Honduras Salzburg (defunct)
Honduras		United States	Galicia–Honduras (defunct)
Hungaria, Magyar	Mostly clubs founded by and for members of the Hungarian diaspora.	Australia	Melbourne Hungaria (defunct)
Hungaria, Magyar	Mostly clubs founded by and for members of the Hungarian diaspora.	Hungary	Magyar AC
Hungaria, Magyar	Mostly clubs founded by and for members of the Hungarian diaspora.	Italy	Hungaria FbC Roma (defunct)
Hungaria, Magyar	Mostly clubs founded by and for members of the Hungarian diaspora.	Peru	Hungaritos Agustinos
Hungaria, Magyar	Mostly clubs founded by and for members of the Hungarian diaspora.	United States	Bethlehem Hungarian (defunct), Bridgeport Hungaria (defunct), Magyar-American (defunct), New Brunswick Hungarian Americans (defunct), New York Hungaria (defunct)
International	Clubs with this name usually are clubs that are global (worldwide) or that welcome anyone from around the world.	Andorra	Inter Club d'Escaldes
International	Clubs with this name usually are clubs that are global (worldwide) or that welcome anyone from around the world.	Australia	Perth Kangaroos International FC (defunct), Inter Monaro
International	Clubs with this name usually are clubs that are global (worldwide) or that welcome anyone from around the world.	Brazil	Sport Club Internacional
International	Clubs with this name usually are clubs that are global (worldwide) or that welcome anyone from around the world.	Cameroon	Inter Lion Ngoma
International	Clubs with this name usually are clubs that are global (worldwide) or that welcome anyone from around the world.	Canada	FC Inter-Montréal (defunct), Internacional de Toronto (defunct), Inter Toronto
International	Clubs with this name usually are clubs that are global (worldwide) or that welcome anyone from around the world.	Cayman Islands	Scholars International
International	Clubs with this name usually are clubs that are global (worldwide) or that welcome anyone from around the world.	Curaçao	Inter Willemstad
International	Clubs with this name usually are clubs that are global (worldwide) or that welcome anyone from around the world.	England	AFC Internazionale
International	Clubs with this name usually are clubs that are global (worldwide) or that welcome anyone from around the world.	Finland	Inter Turku
International	Clubs with this name usually are clubs that are global (worldwide) or that welcome anyone from around the world.	Germany	Inter Leipzig
International	Clubs with this name usually are clubs that are global (worldwide) or that welcome anyone from around the world.	Ghana	International Allies
International	Clubs with this name usually are clubs that are global (worldwide) or that welcome anyone from around the world.	Haiti	Inter de Grand-Goâve
International	Clubs with this name usually are clubs that are global (worldwide) or that welcome anyone from around the world.	India	Inter Kashi
International	Clubs with this name usually are clubs that are global (worldwide) or that welcome anyone from around the world.	Indonesia	Inter Banten
International	Clubs with this name usually are clubs that are global (worldwide) or that welcome anyone from around the world.	Italy	Inter Milan
International	Clubs with this name usually are clubs that are global (worldwide) or that welcome anyone from around the world.	Lithuania	FK Interas Visaginas (defunct)
International	Clubs with this name usually are clubs that are global (worldwide) or that welcome anyone from around the world.	Mexico	Inter Playa del Carmen
International	Clubs with this name usually are clubs that are global (worldwide) or that welcome anyone from around the world.	Montenegro	FK Internacional
International	Clubs with this name usually are clubs that are global (worldwide) or that welcome anyone from around the world.	Papua New Guinea	University Inter
International	Clubs with this name usually are clubs that are global (worldwide) or that welcome anyone from around the world.	Philippines	General Trias International FC (defunct)
International	Clubs with this name usually are clubs that are global (worldwide) or that welcome anyone from around the world.	São Tomé and Príncipe	FC Inter Bom-Bom
International	Clubs with this name usually are clubs that are global (worldwide) or that welcome anyone from around the world.	Singapore	Geylang International
International	Clubs with this name usually are clubs that are global (worldwide) or that welcome anyone from around the world.	Slovakia	Inter Bratislava
International	Clubs with this name usually are clubs that are global (worldwide) or that welcome anyone from around the world.	Spain	FC Internacional (defunct)
International	Clubs with this name usually are clubs that are global (worldwide) or that welcome anyone from around the world.	Sweden	FC Stockholm Internazionale
International	Clubs with this name usually are clubs that are global (worldwide) or that welcome anyone from around the world.	Thailand	Inter Bangkok
International	Clubs with this name usually are clubs that are global (worldwide) or that welcome anyone from around the world.	Ukraine	Inter Boyarka (defunct), Avanhard-Inter Rovenky (until 2005)
International	Clubs with this name usually are clubs that are global (worldwide) or that welcome anyone from around the world.	United States	Cleveland Internationals (defunct), San Antonio International (defunct), Inter Atlanta FC, Inter Miami CF, Williamsburg International
International	Clubs with this name usually are clubs that are global (worldwide) or that welcome anyone from around the world.	Wales	UWIC Inter Cardiff, Inter Cardiff (defunct)
Iran	Mostly clubs founded by and for members of the Iranian diaspora.	Australia	Iranian Football Association Australia
Irish	Clubs founded by and for members of the Irish diaspora.	England	Milton Keynes Irish
Irish	Clubs founded by and for members of the Irish diaspora.	Spain	Irish FC (defunct)
Irish	Clubs founded by and for members of the Irish diaspora.	United States	Irish-Americans
Italy	Clubs founded by and for members of the Italian diaspora.	Argentina	Club Italiano, Sportivo Italiano
Italy	Clubs founded by and for members of the Italian diaspora.	Australia	Adelaide Juventus FC (formerly), Canberra Juventus FC (see list)
Italy	Clubs founded by and for members of the Italian diaspora.	Brazil	Palestra Itália (Belo Horizonte) (formerly), Palestra Itália (Curitiba) (defunct), Palestra Itália (São Paulo) (formerly)
Italy	Clubs founded by and for members of the Italian diaspora.	Canada	Italia Shooters, Toronto Italia, Hamilton Italo-Canadian (defunct), London Italia Marconi
Italy	Clubs founded by and for members of the Italian diaspora.	Chile	Audax Club Sportivo Italiano
Italy	Clubs founded by and for members of the Italian diaspora.	Germany	US Italiana Lupo-Martini Wolfsburg
Italy	Clubs founded by and for members of the Italian diaspora.	Peru	Circolo Sportivo Italiano
Italy	Clubs founded by and for members of the Italian diaspora.	Switzerland	Società Calcistica Italiana Juventus Zurigo
Italy	Clubs founded by and for members of the Italian diaspora.	United States	Inter-Brooklyn Italians, San Francisco Italian
Italy	Clubs founded by and for members of the Italian diaspora.	Venezuela	Deportivo Italia (formerly), Centro Italo Venezolano (defunct)
Judaism		South Africa	Jewish Guild
Khalsa	Khalsa refers to both a community that follows Sikhism as its religion, as well as a special group of initiated Sikhs.	England	Smethwick Khalsa Football Federation, Sporting Khalsa
Khalsa	Khalsa refers to both a community that follows Sikhism as its religion, as well as a special group of initiated Sikhs.	Singapore	Balestier Khalsa, Singapore Khalsa Association
Korea		Japan	F.C. Korea, Osaka Korean FC, Korea FC United Shikoku
Kurds	Clubs founded by and for members of the Kurdish diaspora.	Sweden	Dalkurd FF, Uppsala Kurd FK
Latvia		Australia	Brunswick Latvia (defunct)
Lechia	Historical and alternative name for Poland, stemming from the word Lech	Poland	Lechia Gdańsk, Lechia Zielona Góra
Lechia	Historical and alternative name for Poland, stemming from the word Lech	Ukraine	Lechia Lwów (defunct)
Maghreb	Maghreb is the name of the region including the Atlas Mountains and the coastal plains of Morocco, Algeria, Tunisia, and Libya	Morocco	Maghreb Association Sportive de Fez, Moghreb Tétouan
Maghreb	Maghreb is the name of the region including the Atlas Mountains and the coastal plains of Morocco, Algeria, Tunisia, and Libya	Netherlands	Magreb '90
Macedonia		Australia	Preston Makedonia, Wollongong Macedonia
Macedonia		North Macedonia	FK Makedonija Vraništa
Mauritius	Clubs founded by and for members of the Mauritian diaspora.	England	Mauritius Sports
Mecklenburg		Germany	Mecklenburg Schwerin
Mexico	Clubs founded by and for members of the Mexican diaspora.	United States	Club Deportivo Mexico
Minster	Minster is an honorific title given to particular churches in England and Wales	England	Reading Minster (defunct)
Mohammedan	Term used as both a noun and an adjective meaning belonging or relating to either the religion of Islam or to that of the Islamic Prophet Muhammad	Bangladesh	Mohammedan SC
Mohammedan	Term used as both a noun and an adjective meaning belonging or relating to either the religion of Islam or to that of the Islamic Prophet Muhammad	India	Mohammedan SC
Monarchy	Real (Spanish pronunciation: [reˈal]) is Spanish for "royal". Reial is the Catalan equivalent, and Koninklijke is a Dutch equivalent. Spanish clubs with the "Real" or "Reial" name, as well as the Honduras club Real España, enjoy the patronage of the Spanish monarchy. In Belgium, once a club has been in operation for 50 years, it is eligible to add "Royal" to its name, in any of the country's three official languages (Dutch, French, German) or in English. Polish clubs here refer to names of specific dynasties (Jagiellonian and Piast)	Australia	Essendon Royals
Monarchy		Bangladesh	Bashundhara Kings, Bikrampur Kings
Monarchy		Belgium	Cercle Brugge Koninklijke Sportvereniging, Club Brugge Koninklijke Voetbalvereniging, Royal Sporting Club Anderlecht, Royal Antwerp, Royal Charleroi Sporting Club
Monarchy		Brazil	Real Brasília
Monarchy		Canada	Real Mississauga, Vancouver Royals (defunct), Westminster Royals (defunct)
Monarchy		Colombia	Real Cartagena, Real Santander
Monarchy		England	Real Bedford, Staplehurst Monarchs, Mickleover Royals (defunct)
Monarchy		Eswatini	Royal Leopards
Monarchy		Ghana	Kotoku Royals
Monarchy		Gibraltar	Prince of Wales F.C. (defunct)
Monarchy		Guyana	Victoria Kings
Monarchy		Honduras	Real España
Monarchy		Italy	Real Montecchio, Real Rimini, Real Vicenza
Monarchy		Mexico	Monarcas Morelia, Real Club España, Real Sociedad de Zacatecas (defunct)
Monarchy		Morocco	AS FAR
Monarchy		Netherlands	Koninklijke HFC, Koninklijke HC&VV, Koninklijke UD, Real Sranang
Monarchy		New Zealand	Dunedin City Royals
Monarchy		Nicaragua	Real Estelí, Real Madriz
Monarchy		Peru	Real Garcilaso
Monarchy		Poland	Korona Kielce, Jagiellonia Białystok, Piast Gliwice
Monarchy		Portugal	Real Sport Clube
Monarchy		Scotland	Harthill Royal
Monarchy		Solomon Islands	Malaita Kingz, Real Kakamora
Monarchy		South Africa	Tembu Royals
Monarchy		Spain	Real Betis, Real Club Celta de Vigo, Real Club Deportivo de A Coruña, Reial CD Espanyol, Real Jaén, Real Balompédica Linense, Real Madrid, Real Mallorca, Real Oviedo, Real Club Recreativo de Huelva, Real Racing Club de Santander, Real Sociedad, Real Sporting de Gijón, Real Unión, Real Valladolid, Real Zaragoza
Monarchy		United States	AHFC Royals, Real Salt Lake, Real Monarchs, Utah Royals
National	"Ahly" is Arabic for "national" Greek: Εθνικός, romanized: Ethnikos, lit. 'National'	Angola	Clube Nacional de Benguela
National	"Ahly" is Arabic for "national" Greek: Εθνικός, romanized: Ethnikos, lit. 'National'	Aruba	Deportivo Nacional
National	"Ahly" is Arabic for "national" Greek: Εθνικός, romanized: Ethnikos, lit. 'National'	Brazil	Nacional FC
National	"Ahly" is Arabic for "national" Greek: Εθνικός, romanized: Ethnikos, lit. 'National'	Bulgaria	FC National Sofia
National	"Ahly" is Arabic for "national" Greek: Εθνικός, romanized: Ethnikos, lit. 'National'	Canada	Toronto Nationals (defunct)
National	"Ahly" is Arabic for "national" Greek: Εθνικός, romanized: Ethnikos, lit. 'National'	Chile	Santiago National (defunct)
National	"Ahly" is Arabic for "national" Greek: Εθνικός, romanized: Ethnikos, lit. 'National'	Colombia	Atlético Nacional
National	"Ahly" is Arabic for "national" Greek: Εθνικός, romanized: Ethnikos, lit. 'National'	Cyprus	Ethnikos Achna, Ethnikos Assia, Ethnikos Latsion
National	"Ahly" is Arabic for "national" Greek: Εθνικός, romanized: Ethnikos, lit. 'National'	Ecuador	El Nacional
National	"Ahly" is Arabic for "national" Greek: Εθνικός, romanized: Ethnikos, lit. 'National'	Egypt	Al Ahly
National	"Ahly" is Arabic for "national" Greek: Εθνικός, romanized: Ethnikos, lit. 'National'	Greece	Ethnikos Asteras, Ethnikos Athens, Ethnikos Filippiada, Ethnikos Katerini, Ethnikos Piraeus
National	"Ahly" is Arabic for "national" Greek: Εθνικός, romanized: Ethnikos, lit. 'National'	Honduras	Atlético Nacional
National	"Ahly" is Arabic for "national" Greek: Εθνικός, romanized: Ethnikos, lit. 'National'	Jordan	Al-Ahli
National	"Ahly" is Arabic for "national" Greek: Εθνικός, romanized: Ethnikos, lit. 'National'	Libya	Al-Ahly, Al-Ahly (Benghazi)
National	"Ahly" is Arabic for "national" Greek: Εθνικός, romanized: Ethnikos, lit. 'National'	Norway	SK Nationalkameratene
National	"Ahly" is Arabic for "national" Greek: Εθνικός, romanized: Ethnikos, lit. 'National'	Panama	S.D. Atlético Nacional
National	"Ahly" is Arabic for "national" Greek: Εθνικός, romanized: Ethnikos, lit. 'National'	Paraguay	Club Nacional
National	"Ahly" is Arabic for "national" Greek: Εθνικός, romanized: Ethnikos, lit. 'National'	Peru	Nacional FBC
National	"Ahly" is Arabic for "national" Greek: Εθνικός, romanized: Ethnikos, lit. 'National'	Portugal	C.D. Nacional
National	"Ahly" is Arabic for "national" Greek: Εθνικός, romanized: Ethnikos, lit. 'National'	Qatar	Al-Ahli (Doha)
National	"Ahly" is Arabic for "national" Greek: Εθνικός, romanized: Ethnikos, lit. 'National'	Romania	Naţional București
National	"Ahly" is Arabic for "national" Greek: Εθνικός, romanized: Ethnikos, lit. 'National'	São Tomé and Príncipe	FC Aliança Nacional
National	"Ahly" is Arabic for "national" Greek: Εθνικός, romanized: Ethnikos, lit. 'National'	Saudi Arabia	Al-Ahli (Jeddah)
National	"Ahly" is Arabic for "national" Greek: Εθνικός, romanized: Ethnikos, lit. 'National'	United Arab Emirates	Al-Ahli Football Club – Dubai
National	"Ahly" is Arabic for "national" Greek: Εθνικός, romanized: Ethnikos, lit. 'National'	United States	New York Nationals (defunct)
National	"Ahly" is Arabic for "national" Greek: Εθνικός, romanized: Ethnikos, lit. 'National'	Uruguay	Nacional de Montevideo
Nepal	Clubs founded by and for members of the Nepali diaspora.	Hong Kong	Hong Kong Nepalese Football Association
Norsemen		England	Norsemen F.C.
Palestine	Clubs founded by and for members of the Palestinian diaspora.	Chile	Club Deportivo Palestino
Palestine	Clubs founded by and for members of the Palestinian diaspora.	Honduras	Palestino FC
Palestine	Clubs founded by and for members of the Palestinian diaspora.	Jordan	Al-Wehdat
Paraguay	Mostly clubs founded by and for members of the Paraguayan diaspora.	Argentina	Deportivo Paraguayo
Polonia	Refers to the Polish diaspora, from the Latin name for Poland	Australia	Polonia Sports Club
Polonia	Refers to the Polish diaspora, from the Latin name for Poland	Czechoslovakia	Polonia Karwina (defunct)
Polonia	Refers to the Polish diaspora, from the Latin name for Poland	Germany	Polonia Berlin
Polonia	Refers to the Polish diaspora, from the Latin name for Poland	Kingdom of Romania	Polonia Cernăuți (defunct)
Polonia	Refers to the Polish diaspora, from the Latin name for Poland	Lithuania	Polonia Wilno
Polonia	Refers to the Polish diaspora, from the Latin name for Poland	Poland	Polonia Bydgoszcz, Polonia Bytom, Polonia Nowy Tomyśl, Polonia Poznań, Polonia Przemyśl, Polonia Słubice, Polonia Świdnica, Polonia Warszawa
Polonia	Refers to the Polish diaspora, from the Latin name for Poland	Ukraine	Polonia Khmelnytsky
Pomerania	Pommern: German for Pomerania.	Germany	Pommern Stralsund (defunct)
Portugal	Clubs founded by and for members of the Portuguese diaspora.	Andorra	Lusitanos
Portugal	Clubs founded by and for members of the Portuguese diaspora.	Australia	Clube Portugues de Sydney
Portugal	Clubs founded by and for members of the Portuguese diaspora.	Brazil	Associação Portuguesa de Desportos, Associação Atlética Portuguesa, Associação Portuguesa Londrinense, Associação Atlética Portuguesa Santista, Luzitano
Portugal	Clubs founded by and for members of the Portuguese diaspora.	Canada	Toronto Supra Portuguese
Portugal	Clubs founded by and for members of the Portuguese diaspora.	France	US Lusitanos Saint-Maur, US Créteil-Lusitanos
Portugal	Clubs founded by and for members of the Portuguese diaspora.	Jersey	Jersey Portuguese
Portugal	Clubs founded by and for members of the Portuguese diaspora.	United States	Ludlow Lusitano, Newark Portuguese
Portugal	Clubs founded by and for members of the Portuguese diaspora.	Venezuela	Portuguesa Fútbol Club
Presbyterianism	Historically Reformed Protestant tradition named after its form of church government by representative assemblies of elders, known as "presbyters".	Northern Ireland	Millisle Presbyterian
Prussia	Borussia and Preußen/Preussen are the Latin and German names for Prussia, respectively.	England	Prussia FC
Prussia	Borussia and Preußen/Preussen are the Latin and German names for Prussia, respectively.	Germany	Tennis Borussia Berlin, Borussia Brandenburg, Borussia Bocholt, Borussia Dortmund, Borussia Freialdenhoven, Herforder SV Borussia Friedenstal, Borussia Fulda, Borussia Gaarden / Borussia Kiel (defunct), Borussia Halle (defunct), Borussia Harburg (defunct), Borussia 06 Hildesheim (defunct), VfV Borussia 06 Hildesheim, Borussia Lindenthal-Hohenlind, Borussia Mönchengladbach, Borussia Neunkirchen, 1. Stettiner Borussia-Poseidon (defunct), Borussia-Preußen Stettin (defunct), Borussia Rheine (defunct), Borussia Wuppertal, Wuppertaler SV Borussia (formerly), Preußen Bad Langensalza, BFC Preussen, Preußen Biehla (defunct), Preußen Breslau (defunct), Preußen Burg (defunct), Preussen Chemnitz (defunct), Preußen Danzig (defunct), Preußen Dellbrück (defunct), Preußen Duisburg, Preussen Eberswalde, Preußen Elsterwerda, Preußen Essen, Preußen Frankfurt (Oder) (defunct), Preußen Glatz (defunct), Preußen 1911 Glogau (defunct), Preußen Görlitz (formerly, defunct), Preußen Greifswald (defunct), Preußen Greppin, Preußen Gollnow (defunct), Preußen Gumbinnen (defunct), Preußen Halberstadt (defunct), Preußen Hameln (defunct), Preussen Hameln 07, Preussen Hindenburg (defunct), 1. FC Preußen Hochlarmark, Preußen Hochlarmark (defunct), Preußen Insterburg (defunct), Preußen 1909 Itzehoe (formerly, defunct), Preußen Kattowitz (defunct), Preußen Koblenz, Preußen Köln (formerly), Preußen Konstadt (defunct), Preussen Koslin (defunct), Preussen Krefeld, Preußen Lengerich, Preußen Magdeburg, Preußen-Wacker Magdeburg (defunct), Preußen Merchweiler, Preußen Mielau (defunct), Preußen Münster, Preußen 1916 Namslau (defunct), Preußen Neisse (defunct), Preußen Nordhausen (defunct), Preußen Padeborn (defunct), Preußen Reinfeld, Preussen Schweidnitz (defunct), Preußen Stendal (defunct), Preußen Stettin (defunct), Preußen Suhl (defunct), Preußen Waldenburg-Altwasser (defunct), Preussen Weissenfels (defunct), Prussia-Samland Königsberg (defunct), Rasensport-Preußen Königsberg (defunct), Viktoria Preußen
Prussia	Borussia and Preußen/Preussen are the Latin and German names for Prussia, respectively.	United States	King of Prussia SC
Romania	Mostly clubs founded by and for members of the Romanian diaspora.	England	F.C. Romania (defunct)
Romania	Mostly clubs founded by and for members of the Romanian diaspora.	Kingdom of Romania	Româno-Americană București (defunct)
Russia		Russia	Rusichi Oryol
Saint	Santos is Portuguese and Spanish for saints. Southampton were originally called St. Mary's Young Men's Association F.C. (usually abbreviated to "St. Mary's Y.M.A."), taking on the names St. Mary's F.C. and Southampton St. Mary's before settling on the present name.	Angola	Santos de Angola
Saint	Santos is Portuguese and Spanish for saints. Southampton were originally called St. Mary's Young Men's Association F.C. (usually abbreviated to "St. Mary's Y.M.A."), taking on the names St. Mary's F.C. and Southampton St. Mary's before settling on the present name.	Australia	St Albans Saints
Saint	Santos is Portuguese and Spanish for saints. Southampton were originally called St. Mary's Young Men's Association F.C. (usually abbreviated to "St. Mary's Y.M.A."), taking on the names St. Mary's F.C. and Southampton St. Mary's before settling on the present name.	Brazil	Santos FC, São Paulo FC
Saint	Santos is Portuguese and Spanish for saints. Southampton were originally called St. Mary's Young Men's Association F.C. (usually abbreviated to "St. Mary's Y.M.A."), taking on the names St. Mary's F.C. and Southampton St. Mary's before settling on the present name.	England	Southampton F.C.
Saint	Santos is Portuguese and Spanish for saints. Southampton were originally called St. Mary's Young Men's Association F.C. (usually abbreviated to "St. Mary's Y.M.A."), taking on the names St. Mary's F.C. and Southampton St. Mary's before settling on the present name.	Guernsey	Manor Farm Saints
Saint	Santos is Portuguese and Spanish for saints. Southampton were originally called St. Mary's Young Men's Association F.C. (usually abbreviated to "St. Mary's Y.M.A."), taking on the names St. Mary's F.C. and Southampton St. Mary's before settling on the present name.	Malta	Qala Saints
Saint	Santos is Portuguese and Spanish for saints. Southampton were originally called St. Mary's Young Men's Association F.C. (usually abbreviated to "St. Mary's Y.M.A."), taking on the names St. Mary's F.C. and Southampton St. Mary's before settling on the present name.	Mexico	Santos Laguna
Saint	Santos is Portuguese and Spanish for saints. Southampton were originally called St. Mary's Young Men's Association F.C. (usually abbreviated to "St. Mary's Y.M.A."), taking on the names St. Mary's F.C. and Southampton St. Mary's before settling on the present name.	Peru	San Agustín, Franciscano San Román, San José, San Martín, San Lorenzo de Almagro de Chiclayo, San Lorenzo
Saint	Santos is Portuguese and Spanish for saints. Southampton were originally called St. Mary's Young Men's Association F.C. (usually abbreviated to "St. Mary's Y.M.A."), taking on the names St. Mary's F.C. and Southampton St. Mary's before settling on the present name.	Scotland	St Johnstone, St Mirren
Saint	Santos is Portuguese and Spanish for saints. Southampton were originally called St. Mary's Young Men's Association F.C. (usually abbreviated to "St. Mary's Y.M.A."), taking on the names St. Mary's F.C. and Southampton St. Mary's before settling on the present name.	United States	Hibernian Saints (defunct)
Saint	Santos is Portuguese and Spanish for saints. Southampton were originally called St. Mary's Young Men's Association F.C. (usually abbreviated to "St. Mary's Y.M.A."), taking on the names St. Mary's F.C. and Southampton St. Mary's before settling on the present name.	Wales	The New Saints of Oswestry Town & Llansantffraid, Merthyr Saints
Saint	Santos is Portuguese and Spanish for saints. Southampton were originally called St. Mary's Young Men's Association F.C. (usually abbreviated to "St. Mary's Y.M.A."), taking on the names St. Mary's F.C. and Southampton St. Mary's before settling on the present name.	Zimbabwe	Zimbabwe Saints
Saxony	Sachsen: German for Saxony.	Germany	Sachsen Leipzig (defunct), Sachsen 90 Werdau
Scottish	Clubs founded by and for members of the Scottish diaspora.	Australia	Geelong Scottish
Scottish	Clubs founded by and for members of the Scottish diaspora.	Brazil	Scottish Wanderers (defunct)
Scottish	Clubs founded by and for members of the Scottish diaspora.	Canada	Edmonton Scottish
Scottish	Clubs founded by and for members of the Scottish diaspora.	England	United London Scottish (defunct)
Scottish	Clubs founded by and for members of the Scottish diaspora.	Jersey	Jersey Scottish
Scottish	Clubs founded by and for members of the Scottish diaspora.	United States	Kearny Scots
Serbia	Clubs founded by and for members of the Serbian diaspora.	Australia	Fitzroy City Serbia (see list)
Serbia	Clubs founded by and for members of the Serbian diaspora.	Canada	Serbian White Eagles
Serbia	Clubs founded by and for members of the Serbian diaspora.	Sweden	Serbiska KIF Semberija
Slav	Slavia, Slavija and Slovan all refer to the Slavic peoples. Slovianets Konotop refers to a local Ukrainian-Bulgarian joint enterprise.	Australia	Slavia Melbourne (defunct)
Slav	Slavia, Slavija and Slovan all refer to the Slavic peoples. Slovianets Konotop refers to a local Ukrainian-Bulgarian joint enterprise.	Austria	SK Slovan HAC
Slav	Slavia, Slavija and Slovan all refer to the Slavic peoples. Slovianets Konotop refers to a local Ukrainian-Bulgarian joint enterprise.	Belarus	Slavia Mozyr
Slav	Slavia, Slavija and Slovan all refer to the Slavic peoples. Slovianets Konotop refers to a local Ukrainian-Bulgarian joint enterprise.	Bosnia and Herzegovina	Slavija Sarajevo
Slav	Slavia, Slavija and Slovan all refer to the Slavic peoples. Slovianets Konotop refers to a local Ukrainian-Bulgarian joint enterprise.	Bulgaria	Slavia Sofia
Slav	Slavia, Slavija and Slovan all refer to the Slavic peoples. Slovianets Konotop refers to a local Ukrainian-Bulgarian joint enterprise.	Czech Republic	Slavia Praha, Slavia Orlová-Lutyně, Slovan Liberec
Slav	Slavia, Slavija and Slovan all refer to the Slavic peoples. Slovianets Konotop refers to a local Ukrainian-Bulgarian joint enterprise.	Serbia	Slavija Kragujevac
Slav	Slavia, Slavija and Slovan all refer to the Slavic peoples. Slovianets Konotop refers to a local Ukrainian-Bulgarian joint enterprise.	Slovakia	Slovan Bratislava, Slovan Duslo Šaľa,
Slav	Slavia, Slavija and Slovan all refer to the Slavic peoples. Slovianets Konotop refers to a local Ukrainian-Bulgarian joint enterprise.	Slovenia	ND Slovan
Slav	Slavia, Slavija and Slovan all refer to the Slavic peoples. Slovianets Konotop refers to a local Ukrainian-Bulgarian joint enterprise.	Ukraine	Slovianets Konotop (until 1999)
Spain	Clubs founded by and for members of the Spanish diaspora.	Argentina	Deportivo Español
Spain	Clubs founded by and for members of the Spanish diaspora.	Chile	Unión Española
Spain	Clubs founded by and for members of the Spanish diaspora.	Ecuador	Deportivo Español (defunct)
Spain	Clubs founded by and for members of the Spanish diaspora.	El Salvador	España F.C. (defunct)
Spain	Clubs founded by and for members of the Spanish diaspora.	Honduras	Real C.D. España, Atlético Español (defunct)
Spain	Clubs founded by and for members of the Spanish diaspora.	Mexico	Real Club España, Atlético Español (defunct), Centro Deportivo Español (defunct)
Spain	Clubs founded by and for members of the Spanish diaspora.	Spain	RCD Espanyol, FC Espanya de Barcelona (defunct), Club Español de Madrid (defunct), Spanish Girl's Club (defunct)
Spain	Clubs founded by and for members of the Spanish diaspora.	United States	Club España (defunct)
Spain	Clubs founded by and for members of the Spanish diaspora.	Uruguay	Central Español
Spain	Clubs founded by and for members of the Spanish diaspora.	Venezuela	Español de Venezuela (defunct)
Sudovia	Ancient Baltic land inhabited by Sudovians	Lithuania	FK Sūduva Marijampolė
Suriname	Clubs founded by and for members of the Surinamese diaspora. Sranan Tongo: Sranang, lit. 'Suriname'	Netherlands	Real Sranang
Temperance movement	A social movement promoting temperance or total abstinence from consumption of alcoholic beverages. Pioneers F.C. were founded by members of the Pioneer Total Abstinence Association.	England	Bell's Temperance (defunct), Bolton St Luke's Temperance (defunct)
Temperance movement	A social movement promoting temperance or total abstinence from consumption of alcoholic beverages. Pioneers F.C. were founded by members of the Pioneer Total Abstinence Association.	Republic of Ireland	Pioneers F.C.
Temperance movement	A social movement promoting temperance or total abstinence from consumption of alcoholic beverages. Pioneers F.C. were founded by members of the Pioneer Total Abstinence Association.	Scotland	Greenock Abstainers (defunct), Temperance Athletic (defunct), United Abstainers (defunct)
Trinity	The Trinity is a Christian doctrine concerning the nature of God. It defines one God as existing in three divine persons: God the Father, God the Son (Jesus Christ), and God the Holy Spirit.	England	Gainsborough Trinity, Bridlington Trinity (defunct), Sutton Trinity (defunct), Trinity (Shrewsbury) F.C. (defunct)
Trinity	The Trinity is a Christian doctrine concerning the nature of God. It defines one God as existing in three divine persons: God the Father, God the Son (Jesus Christ), and God the Holy Spirit.	Jersey	Trinity F.C.
Trinity	The Trinity is a Christian doctrine concerning the nature of God. It defines one God as existing in three divine persons: God the Father, God the Son (Jesus Christ), and God the Holy Spirit.	Scotland	Trinity F.C. (defunct)
Turkey	Clubs founded by and for members of the Turkish diaspora.	Australia	Albion Rovers Turk Gucu
Turkey	Clubs founded by and for members of the Turkish diaspora.	Germany	Türkiyemspor Berlin, Türkgücü München, Berlin Türkspor 1965, Türkspor Bremen-Nord, Türkiye Wilhelmsburg
Turkey	Clubs founded by and for members of the Turkish diaspora.	Netherlands	FC Türkiyemspor
Turkey	Clubs founded by and for members of the Turkish diaspora.	Sweden	Konyaspor KIF, Turkiska SK
Tyrol	Tirol: German for Tyrol.	Austria	Swarovski Tirol (defunct), Tirol Innsbruck (defunct), WSG Tirol
Ukraine	Clubs founded by and for members of the Ukrainian diaspora.	Australia	Inglewood Kyiv, Ukrainian SK Essendon Lions (defunct)
Ukraine	Clubs founded by and for members of the Ukrainian diaspora.	Canada	Montreal Ukrainians, Toronto Tridents, Toronto Ukrainians, Ukraine AC
Ukraine	Clubs founded by and for members of the Ukrainian diaspora.	Czechoslovakia	Rusj Užhorod (defunct)
Ukraine	Clubs founded by and for members of the Ukrainian diaspora.	Poland	Ukraina Lwów (defunct)
Ukraine	Clubs founded by and for members of the Ukrainian diaspora.	United States	New York Ukrainians, Newark Ukrainian Sitch, Philadelphia Ukrainians, Rochester Ukrainians, Ukrainian Lions
Uruguay	Mostly clubs founded by and for members of the Uruguayan diaspora.	Bonaire	SV Uruguay
Uruguay	Mostly clubs founded by and for members of the Uruguayan diaspora.	Costa Rica	Club Sport Uruguay
Uruguay	Mostly clubs founded by and for members of the Uruguayan diaspora.	Uruguay	Uruguay Athletic Club (defunct)
Vytis/Pogoń	Coat of arms of Lithuania, known in Lithuanian as Vytis or Pahonia, Pogoń in Polish and Belarusian	Lithuania	Vilniaus Vytis (defunct), Vytis Kaunas (until 1994)
Vytis/Pogoń	Coat of arms of Lithuania, known in Lithuanian as Vytis or Pahonia, Pogoń in Polish and Belarusian	Poland	Pogoń Siedlce, Pogoń 1945 Staszów, Pogoń Szczecin, Pogoń Lwów (defunct)
Vytis/Pogoń	Coat of arms of Lithuania, known in Lithuanian as Vytis or Pahonia, Pogoń in Polish and Belarusian	Ukraine	Pogoń Lwów
Wesleyan	Theological tradition in Protestant Christianity based upon the ministry of the 18th-century evangelical reformer brothers John Wesley and Charles Wesley	England	Bury Wesleyans, Mansfield Wesleyans
Westphalia	German: Westfalen	Germany	Westfalia Schalke (former)

== Geographical features ==
Topic	Meaning	Country	Clubs
Country	Country in name Team America were so named as they were the United States men's national team in professional form, entering league play for the 1983 season of the North American Soccer League.	Argentina	Argentinos Juniors, Argentino de Junín, Argentino de Rosario, Argentino de Quilmes, Sociedad Sportiva Argentina (defunct)
Country	Country in name Team America were so named as they were the United States men's national team in professional form, entering league play for the 1983 season of the North American Soccer League.	Armenia	FC Ararat-Armenia
Country	Country in name Team America were so named as they were the United States men's national team in professional form, entering league play for the 1983 season of the North American Soccer League.	Austria	Austria Kärnten (defunct), Austria Kärnten (2007-2010) (defunct), Austria Klagenfurt, Austria Lustenau, Austria Wien, Austria Salzburg, RB Salzburg (formerly), Austria Vösendorf (formerly)
Country	Country in name Team America were so named as they were the United States men's national team in professional form, entering league play for the 1983 season of the North American Soccer League.	Bahrain	Bahrain SC
Country	Country in name Team America were so named as they were the United States men's national team in professional form, entering league play for the 1983 season of the North American Soccer League.	Brazil	Grêmio Esportivo Brasil, Clube de Regatas Brasil, Red Bull Brasil, Desportivo Brasil
Country	Country in name Team America were so named as they were the United States men's national team in professional form, entering league play for the 1983 season of the North American Soccer League.	Canada	Sudbury Canadians, Vancouver Royal Canadians (defunct)
Country	Country in name Team America were so named as they were the United States men's national team in professional form, entering league play for the 1983 season of the North American Soccer League.	Central African Republic	Stade Centrafricaine Tocages
Country	Country in name Team America were so named as they were the United States men's national team in professional form, entering league play for the 1983 season of the North American Soccer League.	Croatia	HNK Đakovo Croatia, NK Croatia Đakovo (defunct), NK Croatia Zmijavci
Country	Country in name Team America were so named as they were the United States men's national team in professional form, entering league play for the 1983 season of the North American Soccer League.	(Democratic Republic of the Congo) Democratic Republic of Congo	FC Renaissance du Congo
Country	Country in name Team America were so named as they were the United States men's national team in professional form, entering league play for the 1983 season of the North American Soccer League.	Estonia	JS Estonia Tallinn (defunct)
Country	Country in name Team America were so named as they were the United States men's national team in professional form, entering league play for the 1983 season of the North American Soccer League.	France	Racing Club de France, Club Français (defunct), Stade Français
Country	Country in name Team America were so named as they were the United States men's national team in professional form, entering league play for the 1983 season of the North American Soccer League.	Ghana	Red Bull Ghana (defunct)
Country	Country in name Team America were so named as they were the United States men's national team in professional form, entering league play for the 1983 season of the North American Soccer League.	Guinea	Étoile de Guinée
Country	Country in name Team America were so named as they were the United States men's national team in professional form, entering league play for the 1983 season of the North American Soccer League.	Haiti	Racing Club Haïtien
Country	Country in name Team America were so named as they were the United States men's national team in professional form, entering league play for the 1983 season of the North American Soccer League.	Honduras	Honduras Progreso, Honduras Salzburg (defunct)
Country	Country in name Team America were so named as they were the United States men's national team in professional form, entering league play for the 1983 season of the North American Soccer League.	Hungary	Magyar AC
Country	Country in name Team America were so named as they were the United States men's national team in professional form, entering league play for the 1983 season of the North American Soccer League.	Iran	Iran Club (defunct)
Country	Country in name Team America were so named as they were the United States men's national team in professional form, entering league play for the 1983 season of the North American Soccer League.	Jordan	Jordan Knights
Country	Country in name Team America were so named as they were the United States men's national team in professional form, entering league play for the 1983 season of the North American Soccer League.	Mongolia	Hunters FC Mongolia
Country	Country in name Team America were so named as they were the United States men's national team in professional form, entering league play for the 1983 season of the North American Soccer League.	New Zealand	New Zealand Knights (defunct)
Country	Country in name Team America were so named as they were the United States men's national team in professional form, entering league play for the 1983 season of the North American Soccer League.	Oman	Oman Club
Country	Country in name Team America were so named as they were the United States men's national team in professional form, entering league play for the 1983 season of the North American Soccer League.	Portugal	Sporting Clube de Portugal
Country	Country in name Team America were so named as they were the United States men's national team in professional form, entering league play for the 1983 season of the North American Soccer League.	Qatar	Qatar SC
Country	Country in name Team America were so named as they were the United States men's national team in professional form, entering league play for the 1983 season of the North American Soccer League.	Republic of the Congo	Étoile du Congo
Country	Country in name Team America were so named as they were the United States men's national team in professional form, entering league play for the 1983 season of the North American Soccer League.	San Marino	San Marino Calcio
Country	Country in name Team America were so named as they were the United States men's national team in professional form, entering league play for the 1983 season of the North American Soccer League.	Togo	Étoile Filante du Togo
Country	Country in name Team America were so named as they were the United States men's national team in professional form, entering league play for the 1983 season of the North American Soccer League.	United States	Chivas USA (defunct), Team America (defunct)
Country	Country in name Team America were so named as they were the United States men's national team in professional form, entering league play for the 1983 season of the North American Soccer League.	Uruguay	Uruguay Athletic Club (defunct)
Country	Country in name Team America were so named as they were the United States men's national team in professional form, entering league play for the 1983 season of the North American Soccer League.	Venezuela	Atlético Venezuela (defunct)
Country	Country in name Team America were so named as they were the United States men's national team in professional form, entering league play for the 1983 season of the North American Soccer League.	Zimbabwe	Zimbabwe Saints
Archipelago		Scotland	Orkney
Border		Canada	Windsor Border Stars (former)
Border		Zimbabwe	Border Strikers
Borough/Suburb	Neighborhood or district	Argentina	Lanús, Banfield, Boca Juniors Temperley, Quilmes, Chacarita, Las Palmas, Tigre, Almagro, Villa San Carlos, San Telmo, Deportivo Morón, Deportivo Merlo, Barracas Central, Sportivo Barracas, Defensores de Belgrano, Defensores de Cambaceres, Berazategui, Cañuelas, Dock Sud, Liniers, Luján, San Miguel, Ituzaingó, Claypole, Muñiz, General Paz Juniors
Borough/Suburb	Neighborhood or district	Belgium	Anderlecht, Union Saint-Gilloise
Borough/Suburb	Neighborhood or district	Canada	ACP Montréal-Nord, The Borough FC
Borough/Suburb	Neighborhood or district	Denmark	Brøndby IF
Borough/Suburb	Neighborhood or district	Egypt	Zamalek
Borough/Suburb	Neighborhood or district	England	Aston Villa, Brentford, Charlton Athletic, Chelsea, Everton, Fulham, Leyton Orient, Tottenham Hotspur, West Ham United, Wimbledon
Borough/Suburb	Neighborhood or district	France	Paris Saint-Germain, Paris 13 Atletico
Borough/Suburb	Neighborhood or district	Germany	1. Bockenheimer FC 1899 (defunct), FC Schalke 04, FC St. Pauli, Olympia Neugablonz
Borough/Suburb	Neighborhood or district	Hungary	Ferencváros
Borough/Suburb	Neighborhood or district	Italy	Chievo, Sampdoria
Borough/Suburb	Neighborhood or district	Japan	Omiya Ardija, Shimizu S-Pulse, Urawa Red Diamonds (all former independent towns which merged into larger cities)
Borough/Suburb	Neighborhood or district	Netherlands	Cambuur, Feyenoord
Borough/Suburb	Neighborhood or district	Norway	Rosenborg, Strømsgodset, Vålerenga
Borough/Suburb	Neighborhood or district	Poland	Raków Częstochowa, Szombierki Bytom, Widzew Łódź
Borough/Suburb	Neighborhood or district	Portugal	Os Belenenses, Benfica, Boavista, Chelas FC (defunct), Futebol Benfica, Marvilense FC (defunct), C.D. Olivais e Moscavide
Borough/Suburb	Neighborhood or district	South Africa	Orlando Pirates
Borough/Suburb	Neighborhood or district	Spain	Añorga, Atlético Albericia, Atlético Santa Cruz, Carabanchel, Casetas, Ceares, Coruxo, Covadonga, Moscardó, Navarro, Rápido de Bouzas, Rayo Vallecano, San Juan, Silva, Tamaraceite, Txantrea, Unión Adarve, Villaverde San Andrés, Yagüe
Borough/Suburb	Neighborhood or district	Sweden	Djurgårdens IF, Hammarby IF, Örgryte IS
Borough/Suburb	Neighborhood or district	Turkey	Beşiktaş, Fenerbahçe
Borough/Suburb	Neighborhood or district	Ukraine	Livyi Bereh Kyiv, Obolon Kyiv, Peremoha Dnipro
Borough/Suburb	Neighborhood or district	Uruguay	Peñarol
Borough/Suburb	Neighborhood or district	United States	Manhattan SC, Bronx United (defunct), Staten Island Vipers (defunct)
Borough/Suburb	Neighborhood or district	Wales	Pembroke Borough
Capital	Clubs that are from cities presently or formerly capitals of either states (such as Albany, New York or Baton Rouge, Louisiana) or countries (such as Ottawa's Capital City F.C.).	Canada	Capital City F.C., National Capital Pioneers (defunct)
Capital	Clubs that are from cities presently or formerly capitals of either states (such as Albany, New York or Baton Rouge, Louisiana) or countries (such as Ottawa's Capital City F.C.).	Laos	Vientiane Capital (defunct)
Capital	Clubs that are from cities presently or formerly capitals of either states (such as Albany, New York or Baton Rouge, Louisiana) or countries (such as Ottawa's Capital City F.C.).	United States	Albany Capitals (defunct), Baton Rouge Capitals (defunct), Capital FC, Capital Sockadillos (defunct), Raleigh Capital Express (defunct)
Cardinal directions	Södra: Swedish for southern; Öster: Swedish for east; Ouest: French for west; Levante: Spanish for east; Oriental: Portuguese for eastern; Nord: German for north.	Australia	Northern Fury, South Melbourne, Western Sydney Wanderers, Western United
Cardinal directions	Södra: Swedish for southern; Öster: Swedish for east; Ouest: French for west; Levante: Spanish for east; Oriental: Portuguese for eastern; Nord: German for north.	(The Bahamas) Bahamas	Western Warriors
Cardinal directions	Södra: Swedish for southern; Öster: Swedish for east; Ouest: French for west; Levante: Spanish for east; Oriental: Portuguese for eastern; Nord: German for north.	Bahrain	East Riffa Club
Cardinal directions	Södra: Swedish for southern; Öster: Swedish for east; Ouest: French for west; Levante: Spanish for east; Oriental: Portuguese for eastern; Nord: German for north.	Bangladesh	East End Club
Cardinal directions	Södra: Swedish for southern; Öster: Swedish for east; Ouest: French for west; Levante: Spanish for east; Oriental: Portuguese for eastern; Nord: German for north.	Bermuda	West End Rovers
Cardinal directions	Södra: Swedish for southern; Öster: Swedish for east; Ouest: French for west; Levante: Spanish for east; Oriental: Portuguese for eastern; Nord: German for north.	Botswana	Great North Tigers
Cardinal directions	Södra: Swedish for southern; Öster: Swedish for east; Ouest: French for west; Levante: Spanish for east; Oriental: Portuguese for eastern; Nord: German for north.	Canada	North Toronto Nitros, Ottawa South United
Cardinal directions	Södra: Swedish for southern; Öster: Swedish for east; Ouest: French for west; Levante: Spanish for east; Oriental: Portuguese for eastern; Nord: German for north.	Cayman Islands	East End United
Cardinal directions	Södra: Swedish for southern; Öster: Swedish for east; Ouest: French for west; Levante: Spanish for east; Oriental: Portuguese for eastern; Nord: German for north.	China	North China
Cardinal directions	Södra: Swedish for southern; Öster: Swedish for east; Ouest: French for west; Levante: Spanish for east; Oriental: Portuguese for eastern; Nord: German for north.	Denmark	Køge Nord
Cardinal directions	Södra: Swedish for southern; Öster: Swedish for east; Ouest: French for west; Levante: Spanish for east; Oriental: Portuguese for eastern; Nord: German for north.	Dominica	Northern Bombers, South East FC
Cardinal directions	Södra: Swedish for southern; Öster: Swedish for east; Ouest: French for west; Levante: Spanish for east; Oriental: Portuguese for eastern; Nord: German for north.	England	Preston North End, Glossop North End, Newcastle East End (defunct), Newcastle West End (defunct), South Liverpool (1935–), South Liverpool (1890s–1921), South West Ham (defunct), Sunderland West End
Cardinal directions	Södra: Swedish for southern; Öster: Swedish for east; Ouest: French for west; Levante: Spanish for east; Oriental: Portuguese for eastern; Nord: German for north.	Fiji	Tailevu North
Cardinal directions	Södra: Swedish for southern; Öster: Swedish for east; Ouest: French for west; Levante: Spanish for east; Oriental: Portuguese for eastern; Nord: German for north.	France	Angers Sporting Club de l'Ouest
Cardinal directions	Södra: Swedish for southern; Öster: Swedish for east; Ouest: French for west; Levante: Spanish for east; Oriental: Portuguese for eastern; Nord: German for north.	Germany	Nord Berlin
Cardinal directions	Södra: Swedish for southern; Öster: Swedish for east; Ouest: French for west; Levante: Spanish for east; Oriental: Portuguese for eastern; Nord: German for north.	Ghana	Northern Ladies F.C.
Cardinal directions	Södra: Swedish for southern; Öster: Swedish for east; Ouest: French for west; Levante: Spanish for east; Oriental: Portuguese for eastern; Nord: German for north.	Guernsey	Northerners A.C.
Cardinal directions	Södra: Swedish for southern; Öster: Swedish for east; Ouest: French for west; Levante: Spanish for east; Oriental: Portuguese for eastern; Nord: German for north.	Guyana	Western Tigers
Cardinal directions	Södra: Swedish for southern; Öster: Swedish for east; Ouest: French for west; Levante: Spanish for east; Oriental: Portuguese for eastern; Nord: German for north.	Hong Kong	Eastern Sports Club, South China AA
Cardinal directions	Södra: Swedish for southern; Öster: Swedish for east; Ouest: French for west; Levante: Spanish for east; Oriental: Portuguese for eastern; Nord: German for north.	India	NorthEast United
Cardinal directions	Södra: Swedish for southern; Öster: Swedish for east; Ouest: French for west; Levante: Spanish for east; Oriental: Portuguese for eastern; Nord: German for north.	Indonesia	East Bali
Cardinal directions	Södra: Swedish for southern; Öster: Swedish for east; Ouest: French for west; Levante: Spanish for east; Oriental: Portuguese for eastern; Nord: German for north.	Ireland	North End Athletic (defunct)
Cardinal directions	Södra: Swedish for southern; Öster: Swedish for east; Ouest: French for west; Levante: Spanish for east; Oriental: Portuguese for eastern; Nord: German for north.	Isle of Man	Northern Athletic (defunct)
Cardinal directions	Södra: Swedish for southern; Öster: Swedish for east; Ouest: French for west; Levante: Spanish for east; Oriental: Portuguese for eastern; Nord: German for north.	Kenya	Western Stima
Cardinal directions	Södra: Swedish for southern; Öster: Swedish for east; Ouest: French for west; Levante: Spanish for east; Oriental: Portuguese for eastern; Nord: German for north.	Laos	Eastern Star (defunct)
Cardinal directions	Södra: Swedish for southern; Öster: Swedish for east; Ouest: French for west; Levante: Spanish for east; Oriental: Portuguese for eastern; Nord: German for north.	Myanmar	Southern Myanmar
Cardinal directions	Södra: Swedish for southern; Öster: Swedish for east; Ouest: French for west; Levante: Spanish for east; Oriental: Portuguese for eastern; Nord: German for north.	New Zealand	Eastern Suburbs, Northern Hearts, Southern United, West Auckland Kiwi True Blues
Cardinal directions	Södra: Swedish for southern; Öster: Swedish for east; Ouest: French for west; Levante: Spanish for east; Oriental: Portuguese for eastern; Nord: German for north.	Northern Ireland	East Belfast
Cardinal directions	Södra: Swedish for southern; Öster: Swedish for east; Ouest: French for west; Levante: Spanish for east; Oriental: Portuguese for eastern; Nord: German for north.	Papua New Guinea	Eastern Stars (defunct)
Cardinal directions	Södra: Swedish for southern; Öster: Swedish for east; Ouest: French for west; Levante: Spanish for east; Oriental: Portuguese for eastern; Nord: German for north.	Portugal	Clube Oriental de Lisboa
Cardinal directions	Södra: Swedish for southern; Öster: Swedish for east; Ouest: French for west; Levante: Spanish for east; Oriental: Portuguese for eastern; Nord: German for north.	Saint Lucia	Northern United All Stars
Cardinal directions	Södra: Swedish for southern; Öster: Swedish for east; Ouest: French for west; Levante: Spanish for east; Oriental: Portuguese for eastern; Nord: German for north.	Scotland	Dundee East End, Eastern, Forfar West End
Cardinal directions	Södra: Swedish for southern; Öster: Swedish for east; Ouest: French for west; Levante: Spanish for east; Oriental: Portuguese for eastern; Nord: German for north.	Seychelles	Northern Dynamo
Cardinal directions	Södra: Swedish for southern; Öster: Swedish for east; Ouest: French for west; Levante: Spanish for east; Oriental: Portuguese for eastern; Nord: German for north.	Sierra Leone	East End Lions, East End Tigers
Cardinal directions	Södra: Swedish for southern; Öster: Swedish for east; Ouest: French for west; Levante: Spanish for east; Oriental: Portuguese for eastern; Nord: German for north.	Singapore	Eastern Thunder
Cardinal directions	Södra: Swedish for southern; Öster: Swedish for east; Ouest: French for west; Levante: Spanish for east; Oriental: Portuguese for eastern; Nord: German for north.	Solomon Islands	Southern United, Western United
Cardinal directions	Södra: Swedish for southern; Öster: Swedish for east; Ouest: French for west; Levante: Spanish for east; Oriental: Portuguese for eastern; Nord: German for north.	Spain	Levante UD
Cardinal directions	Södra: Swedish for southern; Öster: Swedish for east; Ouest: French for west; Levante: Spanish for east; Oriental: Portuguese for eastern; Nord: German for north.	Sweden	Jönköpings Södra IF, Östers IF
Cardinal directions	Södra: Swedish for southern; Öster: Swedish for east; Ouest: French for west; Levante: Spanish for east; Oriental: Portuguese for eastern; Nord: German for north.	Trinidad and Tobago	North East Stars
Cardinal directions	Södra: Swedish for southern; Öster: Swedish for east; Ouest: French for west; Levante: Spanish for east; Oriental: Portuguese for eastern; Nord: German for north.	United States	Northern Nevada Aces (defunct), Southern West Virginia King's Warriors (defunct)
Cardinal directions	Södra: Swedish for southern; Öster: Swedish for east; Ouest: French for west; Levante: Spanish for east; Oriental: Portuguese for eastern; Nord: German for north.	Wales	South Gower, Treharris Athletic Western, West End
Castle		England	Old Castle Swifts (defunct), Shrewsbury Castle Blues (defunct), Winchester Castle (defunct)
Castle		Malawi	Michiru Castles
Castle		United States	Edgewater Castle
Castle		Wales	Caerphilly Castle Ladies F.C.
Cerro	Meaning hill in Spanish	Paraguay	Cerro Corá, Cerro Porteño, Cerro Porteño PF
Cerro	Meaning hill in Spanish	Uruguay	C.A. Cerro
Citadel		Scotland	Inverness Citadel (defunct)
City	Città in Italian or ciudad in Spanish. The City clubs of Manchester, Melbourne and New York are part of the City Football Group.	Albania	FC Dinamo City
City	Città in Italian or ciudad in Spanish. The City clubs of Manchester, Melbourne and New York are part of the City Football Group.	Australia	Adelaide City, Brisbane City, Melbourne City FC
City	Città in Italian or ciudad in Spanish. The City clubs of Manchester, Melbourne and New York are part of the City Football Group.	Bangladesh	City Club
City	Città in Italian or ciudad in Spanish. The City clubs of Manchester, Melbourne and New York are part of the City Football Group.	Bosnia and Herzegovina	FK Tuzla City
City	Città in Italian or ciudad in Spanish. The City clubs of Manchester, Melbourne and New York are part of the City Football Group.	Brazil	Caruaru City
City	Città in Italian or ciudad in Spanish. The City clubs of Manchester, Melbourne and New York are part of the City Football Group.	Burundi	Bujumbura City
City	Città in Italian or ciudad in Spanish. The City clubs of Manchester, Melbourne and New York are part of the City Football Group.	Cambodia	Angkor City
City	Città in Italian or ciudad in Spanish. The City clubs of Manchester, Melbourne and New York are part of the City Football Group.	Canada	Brampton City United, Capital City F.C., Forest City London, London City, Toronto City (defunct), Windsor City
City	Città in Italian or ciudad in Spanish. The City clubs of Manchester, Melbourne and New York are part of the City Football Group.	China	Guangzhou City (defunct)
City	Città in Italian or ciudad in Spanish. The City clubs of Manchester, Melbourne and New York are part of the City Football Group.	Cuba	FC Ciudad de La Habana
City	Città in Italian or ciudad in Spanish. The City clubs of Manchester, Melbourne and New York are part of the City Football Group.	Ecuador	Guayaquil City
City	Città in Italian or ciudad in Spanish. The City clubs of Manchester, Melbourne and New York are part of the City Football Group.	England	Birmingham City, Bradford City, Bristol City, Chester City, Coventry City, Durham City, Exeter City, Hull City, Leeds City, Leicester City, Lincoln City, City of Liverpool, London City Lionesses, Manchester City, Norwich City, Stoke City
City	Città in Italian or ciudad in Spanish. The City clubs of Manchester, Melbourne and New York are part of the City Football Group.	Eswatini	Midas Mbabane City
City	Città in Italian or ciudad in Spanish. The City clubs of Manchester, Melbourne and New York are part of the City Football Group.	Ethiopia	Harar City, Hawassa City
City	Città in Italian or ciudad in Spanish. The City clubs of Manchester, Melbourne and New York are part of the City Football Group.	Finland	Kemi City
City	Città in Italian or ciudad in Spanish. The City clubs of Manchester, Melbourne and New York are part of the City Football Group.	Greece	Chania City
City	Città in Italian or ciudad in Spanish. The City clubs of Manchester, Melbourne and New York are part of the City Football Group.	Hong Kong	Citizen AA
City	Città in Italian or ciudad in Spanish. The City clubs of Manchester, Melbourne and New York are part of the City Football Group.	India	Mumbai City
City	Città in Italian or ciudad in Spanish. The City clubs of Manchester, Melbourne and New York are part of the City Football Group.	Indonesia	F.C. Bekasi City
City	Città in Italian or ciudad in Spanish. The City clubs of Manchester, Melbourne and New York are part of the City Football Group.	Italy	Città di Palermo, Sangiuliano City
City	Città in Italian or ciudad in Spanish. The City clubs of Manchester, Melbourne and New York are part of the City Football Group.	Japan	Tochigi City
City	Città in Italian or ciudad in Spanish. The City clubs of Manchester, Melbourne and New York are part of the City Football Group.	Kenya	Nairobi City Stars
City	Città in Italian or ciudad in Spanish. The City clubs of Manchester, Melbourne and New York are part of the City Football Group.	Malaysia	Petaling Jaya City FC, KL City FC
City	Città in Italian or ciudad in Spanish. The City clubs of Manchester, Melbourne and New York are part of the City Football Group.	Mexico	Indios de Ciudad Juárez (defunct)
City	Città in Italian or ciudad in Spanish. The City clubs of Manchester, Melbourne and New York are part of the City Football Group.	Mongolia	Ulaanbaatar City
City	Città in Italian or ciudad in Spanish. The City clubs of Manchester, Melbourne and New York are part of the City Football Group.	Myanmar	City Yangon (defunct)
City	Città in Italian or ciudad in Spanish. The City clubs of Manchester, Melbourne and New York are part of the City Football Group.	Namibia	Citizens FC
City	Città in Italian or ciudad in Spanish. The City clubs of Manchester, Melbourne and New York are part of the City Football Group.	Netherlands	Almere City
City	Città in Italian or ciudad in Spanish. The City clubs of Manchester, Melbourne and New York are part of the City Football Group.	New Zealand	Auckland City, Lower Hutt City
City	Città in Italian or ciudad in Spanish. The City clubs of Manchester, Melbourne and New York are part of the City Football Group.	Northern Ireland	Armagh City, Derry City, Newry City
City	Città in Italian or ciudad in Spanish. The City clubs of Manchester, Melbourne and New York are part of the City Football Group.	Norway	Oslo City
City	Città in Italian or ciudad in Spanish. The City clubs of Manchester, Melbourne and New York are part of the City Football Group.	Philippines	United City F.C.
City	Città in Italian or ciudad in Spanish. The City clubs of Manchester, Melbourne and New York are part of the City Football Group.	Republic of Ireland	Cork City, Dublin City (defunct), Kilkenny City (defunct)
City	Città in Italian or ciudad in Spanish. The City clubs of Manchester, Melbourne and New York are part of the City Football Group.	Scotland	Brechin City, Elgin City
City	Città in Italian or ciudad in Spanish. The City clubs of Manchester, Melbourne and New York are part of the City Football Group.	Sierra Leone	Freetown City
City	Città in Italian or ciudad in Spanish. The City clubs of Manchester, Melbourne and New York are part of the City Football Group.	Singapore	Lion City Sailors
City	Città in Italian or ciudad in Spanish. The City clubs of Manchester, Melbourne and New York are part of the City Football Group.	Somalia	Mogadishu City Club
City	Città in Italian or ciudad in Spanish. The City clubs of Manchester, Melbourne and New York are part of the City Football Group.	South Africa	Cape Town City
City	Città in Italian or ciudad in Spanish. The City clubs of Manchester, Melbourne and New York are part of the City Football Group.	South Korea	Cheongju City (defunct), Yangju Citizen, Yongin Citizen (defunct)
City	Città in Italian or ciudad in Spanish. The City clubs of Manchester, Melbourne and New York are part of the City Football Group.	Spain	Ciudad de Murcia (defunct), Ciudad de Santiago (defunct)
City	Città in Italian or ciudad in Spanish. The City clubs of Manchester, Melbourne and New York are part of the City Football Group.	Sri Lanka	Matara City Club
City	Città in Italian or ciudad in Spanish. The City clubs of Manchester, Melbourne and New York are part of the City Football Group.	Sweden	Eskilstuna City FK, FC Linköping City
City	Città in Italian or ciudad in Spanish. The City clubs of Manchester, Melbourne and New York are part of the City Football Group.	Taiwan	Tainan City
City	Città in Italian or ciudad in Spanish. The City clubs of Manchester, Melbourne and New York are part of the City Football Group.	Tanzania	Mbeya City
City	Città in Italian or ciudad in Spanish. The City clubs of Manchester, Melbourne and New York are part of the City Football Group.	Thailand	Samut Prakan City F.C.
City	Città in Italian or ciudad in Spanish. The City clubs of Manchester, Melbourne and New York are part of the City Football Group.	United States	Angel City FC, City of Angels FC, Detroit City FC, Louisville City FC, New York City FC, Orlando City SC, St. Louis City SC
City	Città in Italian or ciudad in Spanish. The City clubs of Manchester, Melbourne and New York are part of the City Football Group.	Vietnam	Ho Chi Minh City FC
City	Città in Italian or ciudad in Spanish. The City clubs of Manchester, Melbourne and New York are part of the City Football Group.	Wales	Bangor City, Cardiff City, Newport City, St Asaph City, Swansea City
City	Città in Italian or ciudad in Spanish. The City clubs of Manchester, Melbourne and New York are part of the City Football Group.	Zambia	City of Lusaka
City	Città in Italian or ciudad in Spanish. The City clubs of Manchester, Melbourne and New York are part of the City Football Group.	Zimbabwe	Bulawayo City
Coast	Gialos: Greek for the coast	Australia	Central Coast Mariners, Gold Coast United, South Coast Wolves
Coast	Gialos: Greek for the coast	Jamaica	Sandals South Coast
Coast	Gialos: Greek for the coast	Kenya	Coast Stars, Modern Coast Rangers
Coast	Gialos: Greek for the coast	New Zealand	Coastal Spirit, Hibiscus Coast, Kapiti Coast United, West Coast Rangers
Coast	Gialos: Greek for the coast	Seychelles	Côte d'Or FC
Coast	Gialos: Greek for the coast	Solomon Islands	Central Coast
Coast	Gialos: Greek for the coast	Tanzania	Coastal Union
Coast	Gialos: Greek for the coast	Ukraine	Yalos Yalta (defunct)
Coast	Gialos: Greek for the coast	United States	Central Coast Roadrunners (defunct), Florida Gulf Coast Dutch Lions, North Coast Tsunami, Treasure Coast Tritons
Common	Common land or former common land is usually referred to as a common; for instance, Sutton Common.	England	Clapham Common Club (defunct), Croydon Common (defunct), Sutton Common Rovers
Common	Common land or former common land is usually referred to as a common; for instance, Sutton Common.	United States	Lansing Common
County		Canada	Simcoe County Rovers
County		England	Derby County, Notts County, Stockport County, Rotherham County (defunct)
County		Republic of Ireland	Dún Laoghaire–Rathdown Waves, Kildare County (defunct), Sporting Fingal (defunct)
County		Scotland	East Stirlingshire, Nairn County, Ross County
County		United States	North County United, Oakland County FC, Orange County Blues, Riverside County Elite (defunct), Sonoma County Sol
County		Wales	Cardiff County, Haverfordwest County, Newport County
Demonyms	Club names that are demonyms, i.e. names of inhabitants of a place. Many demonyms in Portuguese-speaking countries end up with "-ense" e.g. Torreense (from Torres Vedras), Oliveirense (from Oliveira de Azeméis), Fluminense (from Rio de Janeiro), Chapecoense (from Chapecó))	Brazil	Agremiação Sportiva Arapiraquense, América Mineiro, Aparecidense, Athletico Paranaense, Atlético Cearense, Atlético Goianiense, Atlético Mineiro, Brasiliense, Chapecoense, Clube Recreativo e Atlético Catalano, Centro Sportivo Alagoano, Figueirense, Fluminense, Fluminense-PI, Jacuipense, Juazeirense, Manaura, Maracaña, Portuguesa, Portuguesa Carioca, Portuguesa Londrinense, Luverdense, Operário Várzea-Grandense, Ouvidorense, São Joseense, Tombense
Demonyms	Club names that are demonyms, i.e. names of inhabitants of a place. Many demonyms in Portuguese-speaking countries end up with "-ense" e.g. Torreense (from Torres Vedras), Oliveirense (from Oliveira de Azeméis), Fluminense (from Rio de Janeiro), Chapecoense (from Chapecó))	England	Actonians L.F.C., Kingstonian, A.F.C. Wulfrunians
Demonyms	Club names that are demonyms, i.e. names of inhabitants of a place. Many demonyms in Portuguese-speaking countries end up with "-ense" e.g. Torreense (from Torres Vedras), Oliveirense (from Oliveira de Azeméis), Fluminense (from Rio de Janeiro), Chapecoense (from Chapecó))	France	AJ Auxerroise, AS Beauvais Oise, Aviron Bayonnais, Olympique Lillois (defunct), Olympique Lyonnais, Stade Brestois 29, Stade Lavallois, Stade Rennais, US Concarnoise, Villefranche Beaujolais
Demonyms	Club names that are demonyms, i.e. names of inhabitants of a place. Many demonyms in Portuguese-speaking countries end up with "-ense" e.g. Torreense (from Torres Vedras), Oliveirense (from Oliveira de Azeméis), Fluminense (from Rio de Janeiro), Chapecoense (from Chapecó))	Germany	1. Bockenheimer FC 1899 (defunct), Altonaer FC von 1893, Ascherslebener SC 1898 (defunct), Berliner FC 1893 (defunct), Berliner FC Alemannia 1890, Berliner FC Alemannia 22 (defunct), Berliner FC Burgund 1896 (defunct), Berliner FC Columbia 1896 (defunct), Berliner FC Concordia 1895, Berliner FC Dynamo, Berliner FC Fortuna 1894 (defunct), Berliner FC Frankfurt 1885 (defunct), Berliner FC Germania 1888, Berliner FC Hertha 1892, Berliner FC Phönix (defunct), Berliner FC Preussen, Berliner FC Stern 1889, Berliner FC Vorwärts 1890 (defunct), Berliner FuCC Deutschland (defunct), Berliner FuCC Rapide 1893, SC Berliner Amateure, Berliner SC Favorit 1896 (defunct), Berliner SC 1899 Komet (defunct), Berliner SV 1892, Berliner TuFC Toscana (defunct), Berliner TuFC Union 1892 (defunct), Berliner TuFC Viktoria 1889 (defunct), Brandenburger SC Süd 05, Brandenburger SV Cottbus-Ost, Deutscher FC Prag (defunct), Deutscher FC Germania Prag (defunct), Deutscher SC Arminia Bielefeld, Deutscher SV 78 Hannover, Dresdner FC 1893 (defunct), Dresdner Fußballring 1902 (defunct), Dresdner SC, Düsseldorfer TSV Fortuna, Frankfurter FC 1899 (defunct), Frankfurter FC Germania 1894, Frankfurter FC Viktoria 1899 (defunct), Freiburger FC, Hamburger FC 1888 (defunct), Hamburger SV, Hanauer FG 1899, Karlsruher FV, Karlsruher SC, Karlsruhe VfB Südstadt (defunct), Kölner BC (defunct), Kölner Sport-Club 1899 (defunct), Leipziger BC 1893, Mannheimer FC Viktoria 1897 (defunct), Mannheimer FG 1896 (defunct), Mannheimer FG Germania 1897 (defunct), Mannheimer FG Union 1897 (defunct), Mannheimer FV 1898 (defunct), Mittweidaer BC (defunct), 1. Münchner FC 1896 (defunct), Pforzheimer FC Frankonia, Straßburger FV 1890 (formerly), Stuttgarter Kickers
Demonyms	Club names that are demonyms, i.e. names of inhabitants of a place. Many demonyms in Portuguese-speaking countries end up with "-ense" e.g. Torreense (from Torres Vedras), Oliveirense (from Oliveira de Azeméis), Fluminense (from Rio de Janeiro), Chapecoense (from Chapecó))	Italy	US Milanese (defunct)
Demonyms	Club names that are demonyms, i.e. names of inhabitants of a place. Many demonyms in Portuguese-speaking countries end up with "-ense" e.g. Torreense (from Torres Vedras), Oliveirense (from Oliveira de Azeméis), Fluminense (from Rio de Janeiro), Chapecoense (from Chapecó))	Poland	KS Warszawianka
Demonyms	Club names that are demonyms, i.e. names of inhabitants of a place. Many demonyms in Portuguese-speaking countries end up with "-ense" e.g. Torreense (from Torres Vedras), Oliveirense (from Oliveira de Azeméis), Fluminense (from Rio de Janeiro), Chapecoense (from Chapecó))	Portugal	Moreirense F.C., S.C. Farense, C.D. Feirense, U.D. Oliveirense, Portimonense S.C., S.C.U. Torreense, C.D. Trofense, A.D. Sanjoanense, F.C. Tirsense, S.C. Vianense, Vilaverdense F.C., A.C. Marinhense, S.U. Sintrense, G.D. Alcochetense, L.G.C. Moncarapachense, S.F. Damaiense, F.C. Barreirense, U.D. Vilafranquense, S.C. Olhanense, A.D. Ovarense, Sertanense F.C., C.U. Idanhense, A.D. Nogueirense, S.C. Angrense, S.G. Sacavenense, S.C. Lourinhanense, U.A. Povoense, C.A. Ouriense, C.D. Pinhalnovense, Mondinense F.C., S.C. Praiense, C.D. Portalegrense 1925, Dumiense F.C., C.D. Celoricense, J.D. Lajense, C.F. Os Armacenses, C.D.R. Quarteirense, U.D. Messinense, C.U. Culatrense, J.D. Monchiquense, J.S. Campinense, U.D.R. Sambrasense, C.D. Marítimo Olhanense, C.D. Arrifanense, S.C. Paivense, A.D. Valonguense, A.D. Valecambrense, S.C. Odemirense, L.C.D. Arraiolense, A.D. Portomosense, G.D.U. Ericeirense, C.F. Os Bucelenses, C.F. Os Montelavarenses, C.R.D. Arrudense, G.D. O Coruchense, U.F.C. Moitense, Palmelense F.C., A.C. Alcarecense, C.R. O Grandolense, G.C. Figueirense
Demonyms	Club names that are demonyms, i.e. names of inhabitants of a place. Many demonyms in Portuguese-speaking countries end up with "-ense" e.g. Torreense (from Torres Vedras), Oliveirense (from Oliveira de Azeméis), Fluminense (from Rio de Janeiro), Chapecoense (from Chapecó))	Réunion	JS Saint-Pierroise
Demonyms	Club names that are demonyms, i.e. names of inhabitants of a place. Many demonyms in Portuguese-speaking countries end up with "-ense" e.g. Torreense (from Torres Vedras), Oliveirense (from Oliveira de Azeméis), Fluminense (from Rio de Janeiro), Chapecoense (from Chapecó))	Scotland	Airdrieonians F.C. (2002–), Airdrieonians F.C. (1878–2002)
Demonyms	Club names that are demonyms, i.e. names of inhabitants of a place. Many demonyms in Portuguese-speaking countries end up with "-ense" e.g. Torreense (from Torres Vedras), Oliveirense (from Oliveira de Azeméis), Fluminense (from Rio de Janeiro), Chapecoense (from Chapecó))	United States	Floridians FC
Demonyms	Club names that are demonyms, i.e. names of inhabitants of a place. Many demonyms in Portuguese-speaking countries end up with "-ense" e.g. Torreense (from Torres Vedras), Oliveirense (from Oliveira de Azeméis), Fluminense (from Rio de Janeiro), Chapecoense (from Chapecó))	Ukraine	WFC Donchanka (defunct), WFC Luhanochka Luhansk (defunct), Stakhanovets Stakhanov (until 2006)
Forest	Indicates a proximity to a forest	Botswana	Black Forest
Forest	Indicates a proximity to a forest	England	Nottingham Forest, Redbridge Forest (defunct), Waltham Forest
Forest	Indicates a proximity to a forest	Lithuania	FK Šilas Kazlų Rūda
Forest	Indicates a proximity to a forest	Poland	Puszcza Niepołomice
Forest	Indicates a proximity to a forest	Seychelles	Foresters Mont Fleuri
Forest	Indicates a proximity to a forest	Zambia	Forest Rangers
Gulf	The present day HNK Rijeka were named after Kvarner Gulf and kept the original name until 1954.	Croatia	Kvarner
Gulf	The present day HNK Rijeka were named after Kvarner Gulf and kept the original name until 1954.	United Arab Emirates	Gulf United
Hamlet		England	Dulwich Hamlet, Soul Tower Hamlets
Heath	These clubs are named after heaths directly, or after the districts that take their names.	England	Hampstead Heathens, Newton Heath, Small Heath Alliance
Island		British Virgin Islands	Islanders FC
Island		Canada	Vancouver Island FC
Island		China	Xiamen Egret Island (defunct)
Island		England	Canvey Island F.C.
Island		Herm	Herm Island
Island		Iran	Qeshm Island CSC
Island		New Zealand	South Island United
Island		Puerto Rico	Puerto Rico Islanders (defunct)
Island		United States	Long Island Rough Riders, Harrisburg City Islanders (defunct)
Kingdom	Srivijaya was an important centre for the expansion of Buddhism from the 8th to the 12th century.	Indonesia	Sriwijaya F.C.
Kingdom	The Ryukyu Kingdom was annexed by Japan in 1879.	Japan	FC Ryukyu
Kingdom		United States	Kalamazoo Kingdom (defunct)
Lake	Ko: Japanese	Australia	South Melbourne Lakers
Lake	Ko: Japanese	Canada	Lakers du Lac Saint-Louis (defunct)
Lake	Ko: Japanese	France	Étoile des Deux Lacs (defunct)
Lake	Ko: Japanese	Japan	MIO Biwako Kusatsu
Lake	Ko: Japanese	Ukraine	SKAD-Yalpuh Bolhrad (defunct)
Lake	Ko: Japanese	United States	Real Salt Lake
Marsh	'Annagh' from Irish Eanach 'Marsh'	Northern Ireland	Annagh United
Metropolis		United States	Sarasota Metropolis FC
Mountain		United States	New Hampshire Mountaineers (defunct)
Mountain		Ukraine	Haray Zhovkva, Hoverla Uzhhorod (defunct), Lysonia Berezhany (until 2002)
Mountain		Wales	Flint Mountain
Mountain range		Poland	Podbeskidzie Bielsko-Biała
Mountain range		Ukraine	Beskyd Nadvirna, Chornohora Ivano-Frankivsk (until 2009), Verkhovyna Uzhhorod (until 1999)
Ocean		Canada	Pacific FC
Ocean		Mexico	Pacific FC (defunct)
Ocean		Nigeria	Ocean Boys
Ocean		Ukraine	Ocean Kerch
Ocean		United States	Rhode Island Oceaneers (defunct)
Parish		Bermuda	Hamilton Parish, Devonshire Cougars
Park	These clubs are named after parks directly, or after the districts that take their names.	Australia	Fraser Park, Holland Park Hawks, Royal Park
Park	These clubs are named after parks directly, or after the districts that take their names.	England	Queens Park Rangers, Upton Park (defunct)
Park	These clubs are named after parks directly, or after the districts that take their names.	Mexico	Popo Park (defunct)
Park	These clubs are named after parks directly, or after the districts that take their names.	New Zealand	Queens Park
Park	These clubs are named after parks directly, or after the districts that take their names.	Northern Ireland	Moyola Park
Park	These clubs are named after parks directly, or after the districts that take their names.	Scotland	Queen's Park, King's Park (defunct)
Park	These clubs are named after parks directly, or after the districts that take their names.	Singapore	Farrer Park United (defunct)
Park	These clubs are named after parks directly, or after the districts that take their names.	South Africa	Highlands Park F.C. (2003–present), Highlands Park F.C. (1990–1992), Highlands Park F.C. (1959–1983)
Park	These clubs are named after parks directly, or after the districts that take their names.	Sri Lanka	Kalutara Park
Park	These clubs are named after parks directly, or after the districts that take their names.	United States	Hyde Park Blues (defunct), Swope Park Rangers (until 2019)
Park	These clubs are named after parks directly, or after the districts that take their names.	Wales	Bradley Park Rangers (defunct), Queens Park (defunct)
Peninsula		Australia	Peninsula Power
Peninsula		Wales	South Gower
Prefecture	Named after their home prefecture. If both a prefecture and its capital are homonyms, the club can be said to represent both.	Japan	Ehime F.C., F.C. Gifu, Thespa Gunma, Tochigi S.C., F.C. Tokyo
Province	Japan's provincial system was abolished in 1871 and replaced with the prefectural system (see Prefecture, above).	Canada	Athletic Club of British Columbia (defunct), FC Manitoba, Nova Scotia Clippers (defunct)
Province	Japan's provincial system was abolished in 1871 and replaced with the prefectural system (see Prefecture, above).	Ireland	Leinster Nomads (defunct)
Province	Japan's provincial system was abolished in 1871 and replaced with the prefectural system (see Prefecture, above).	Japan	Kamatamare Sanuki, Hokkaido Tokachi Sky Earth
Province	Japan's provincial system was abolished in 1871 and replaced with the prefectural system (see Prefecture, above).	Northern Ireland	Ulster (defunct)
Region		Canada	SC Waterloo Region, York Region Shooters, Durham Storm (defunct)
Region		Chile	Regional Atacama (defunct)
Region		China	Inner Mongolia Caoshangfei
Region		Italy	SS Lazio, FC Südtirol
Region		Netherlands	FC Twente
Region		New Zealand	Canterbury United, Hawke's Bay United, Otago United
Region		Peru	Sport Áncash, Deportivo Junín
Region		Poland	Śląsk Wrocław
Region		Ukraine	Arsenal-Kyivshchyna, Cherkashchyna, Kovel-Volyn, Volyn Lutsk, Zakarpattia Uzhgorod (until 2011)
Region		United States	Bay Area Ambassadors (defunct), High Desert Elite, Midwest United, New England Revolution
Republic		Russia	FC Buryatia, Karelia, Mordovia, FC Yakutiya
Republic		United States	Sacramento Republic
River	Rio: Portuguese	Argentina	River Plate
River	Rio: Portuguese	Belarus	Dnepr Mogilev, Neman Grodno
River	Rio: Portuguese	Brazil	River Atlético Clube, Clube Náutico Capibaribe
River	Rio: Portuguese	Canada	Rivers FC
River	Rio: Portuguese	Denmark	BK Avarta
River	Rio: Portuguese	Italy	Virtus Entella
River	Rio: Portuguese	Kazakhstan	Tobol (Kostanay)
River	Rio: Portuguese	Poland	Wisła Kraków, Wisła Płock, Odra Wodzisław, Odra Opole, Warta Poznań, Sian Przemyśl
River	Rio: Portuguese	Portugal	Rio Ave FC
River	Rio: Portuguese	Russia	Amur Blagoveshchensk, FC Amur-2010 Dnepr Smolensk, Irtysh Omsk, Kuban Krasnodar, Terek Grozny, Volga NN, Volga Tver, Volga Ulyanovsk, Volgar Astrakhan, Yenisej Krasnoyarsk, Sheksna
River	Rio: Portuguese	Spain	Sestao River Club
River	Rio: Portuguese	Ukraine	Borysfen Boryspil, Desna Chernihiv, Ikva Mlyniv, Inhulets Petrove, Ros Bila Tserkva, Vorskla Poltava, WFC Yatran Berestivets, Dnipro (defunct), Oskil Kupiansk (defunct), Dnister Ovidiopol (until 2011), Sula Lubny (until 2010)
River	Rio: Portuguese	United States	Colorado Rapids
River	Rio: Portuguese	Vietnam	Song Lam Nghe An
Rock		England	Tytherington Rocks
Rock		Scotland	Rock F.C. (defunct)
Rock		Ukraine	Skala Stryi
Sea		England	London Seaward
Sea		Ukraine	More Feodosia (defunct)
Shire		Australia	Sutherland Shire Casuals
Shire		England	Derbyshire (defunct), East Yorkshire Carnegie (defunct), Hertfordshire Rangers (defunct), Nottinghamshire (defunct), Shropshire Wanderers (defunct), Yorkshire Ammers
Shire		Scotland	East Stirlingshire, East Lanarkshire (defunct)
Shire		Wales	Newport & Monmouthshire County (former)
Shore		England	South Shore F.C. (defunct)
Shore		New Zealand	North Shore United
Shore		United States	Eastern Shore Sharks (defunct), Real Shore (defunct)
Sound	Proximity to a large sea or ocean inlet	United States	Seattle Sounders (1974–1983), Seattle Sounders (1994–2008), Seattle Sounders (2009-), Sound FC, Puget Sound Gunners (defunct)
State		Australia	Queensland Lions
State		Brazil	Amazonas, Bahia, Ceará, Goiás, Paraná
State		Germany	Bavaria 1899 München (defunct), Bayern Alzenau, Bayern Hof, Bayern Munich, Sachsen Leipzig (defunct)
State		India	FC Goa, Kerala Blasters, Madhya Pradesh United, Odisha FC
State		Malaysia	Kedah, Melaka United, Pahang, Perak, Selangor
State		Nigeria	Rivers United
State		United States	Arizona United, Colorado Rapids, Connecticut Passion (defunct), Floridians FC (defunct), Georgia FC, Minnesota United, New York/New Jersey MetroStars (formerly), North Carolina FC (defunct), Southern West Virginia King's Warriors (defunct), Team Hawaii (defunct), Utah United, Wisconsin Rebels (defunct)
State		Venezuela	Portuguesa F.C.
Street		England	Bradford (Park Avenue) A.F.C., Hall Road Rangers, Blackburn Park Road (defunct), South Shields Adelaide Athletic (defunct), Walthamstow Avenue (defunct)
Street		Nepal	New Road Team
Street		Northern Ireland	Hill Street
Street		Republic of Ireland	Phoenix F.C. Navan Road
Street		Saint Kitts and Nevis	United Old Road Jets
Street		Wales	Bow Street, Bridgend Street, Clarbeston Road
Structural basin	The Shooting Stars were named after the Permian Basin, a sedimentary basin.	United States	Permian Basin Shooting Stars (defunct)
Telephone area code	The name Project 51O is partly inspired by Oakland's 510 area code, although features the letter O in place of the number 0 to stand for "Oakland".	United States	402 FC (defunct), FC Tacoma 253, Memphis 901, Project 51O
Town		China	Wuhan Three Towns
Town		Ecuador	Macará
Town		England	Grimsby Town, Huddersfield Town, Halifax Town, Ipswich Town, Luton Town, Shrewsbury Town, Walsall Town Swifts, Yeovil Town
Town		India	Gauhati Town Club, Jorhat Town Club
Town		Northern Ireland	Warrenpoint Town
Town		Poland	Cracovia
Town		Republic of Ireland	Athlone Town, Longford Town
Town		Singapore	Jurong Town
Town		United States	Oly Town FC, The Town FC
Town		Wales	Aberystwyth Town, Caernarfon Town, Merthyr Town, Prestatyn Town
Vale/Valley	Named for teams located in a town in a vale. Wadi: Arabic for vale	Australia	Goulburn Valley Suns
Vale/Valley	Named for teams located in a town in a vale. Wadi: Arabic for vale	Egypt	Wadi Degla
Vale/Valley	Named for teams located in a town in a vale. Wadi: Arabic for vale	England	Port Vale, Aylesbury Vale, Pewsey Vale, Raynes Park Vale
Vale/Valley	Named for teams located in a town in a vale. Wadi: Arabic for vale	India	FC Green Valley
Vale/Valley	Named for teams located in a town in a vale. Wadi: Arabic for vale	Kenya	Rift Valley United
Vale/Valley	Named for teams located in a town in a vale. Wadi: Arabic for vale	Northern Ireland	Colin Valley
Vale/Valley	Named for teams located in a town in a vale. Wadi: Arabic for vale	Scotland	Vale of Atholl, Vale of Clyde, Vale of Leithen, Vale of Leven
Vale/Valley	Named for teams located in a town in a vale. Wadi: Arabic for vale	United States	Napa Valley 1839 FC, Rio Grande Valley FC Toros, Central California Valley Hydra (defunct), Hudson Valley Quickstrike Lady Blues (defunct), Lehigh Valley Cougars (defunct), San Fernando Valley Quakes (defunct)
Vale/Valley	Named for teams located in a town in a vale. Wadi: Arabic for vale	Wales	Aber Valley, Cambrian & Clydach Vale, Nantlle Vale, Vale of Llangollen (defunct)
Villa		Antigua and Barbuda	F.C. Aston Villa
Villa		England	Aston Villa, Pine Villa, Euxton Villa, Northwich Manchester Villa (defunct)
Villa		New Zealand	Douglas Villa
Villa		Northern Ireland	Abbey Villa
Villa		Republic of Ireland	Villa F.C.
Villa		Uganda	SC Villa
Villa		United States	Toledo Villa
Villa		Wales	Graig Villa Dino, New Brighton Villa (defunct)
Village		England	Crawley Down Village, Cudworth Village (defunct)
Village		Northern Ireland	Dromara Village
Village		Saint Kitts and Nevis	Village Superstars
Village		United States	The Villages SC
Village		Wales	Llansantffraid Village

=== Specific geographical features ===
Topic	Meaning	Country	Clubs
Africa	Named after the African continent.	England	African Royal
Africa	Named after the African continent.	Ivory Coast	Africa Sports
Africa	Named after the African continent.	Namibia	African Stars, Black Africa, United Africa Tigers, Young African
Africa	Named after the African continent.	Sweden	Afrikansk FC
Africa	Named after the African continent.	Tanzania	African Sports, Pan African, Young Africans
Africa	Named after the African continent.	Tunisia	Club Africain
Americas	Named after the American continent.	Andorra	CF Atlètic Amèrica
Americas	Named after the American continent.	Brazil	América Football Club, América de Natal, América Mineiro
Americas	Named after the American continent.	Colombia	América de Cali
Americas	Named after the American continent.	Mexico	América
Americas	Named after the American continent.	Paraguay	Sol de América
Americas	Named after the American continent.	Venezuela	América F.C. (defunct)
Ancient cities	Corinth (often refers to the "Corinthian ideal" of amateurism in sport) Sport Club Corinthians USA were a subsidiary of Corinthians Paulista.	Brazil	Corinthians Paulista, Corinthians Alagoano, Atlético Clube Coríntians
Ancient cities	Corinth (often refers to the "Corinthian ideal" of amateurism in sport) Sport Club Corinthians USA were a subsidiary of Corinthians Paulista.	England	Corinthian, Corinthian-Casuals F.C., Islington Corinthians (defunct), Loughborough Corinthians (defunct), Manchester Corinthians (defunct)
Ancient cities	Corinth (often refers to the "Corinthian ideal" of amateurism in sport) Sport Club Corinthians USA were a subsidiary of Corinthians Paulista.	Malta	Żejtun Corinthians
Ancient cities	Corinth (often refers to the "Corinthian ideal" of amateurism in sport) Sport Club Corinthians USA were a subsidiary of Corinthians Paulista.	Republic of Ireland	College Corinthians
Ancient cities	Corinth (often refers to the "Corinthian ideal" of amateurism in sport) Sport Club Corinthians USA were a subsidiary of Corinthians Paulista.	South Africa	Corinthians F.C. (defunct)
Ancient cities	Corinth (often refers to the "Corinthian ideal" of amateurism in sport) Sport Club Corinthians USA were a subsidiary of Corinthians Paulista.	United States	Corinthians FC of San Antonio, Sport Club Corinthians USA (defunct)
Ancient cities	Corinth (often refers to the "Corinthian ideal" of amateurism in sport) Sport Club Corinthians USA were a subsidiary of Corinthians Paulista.	Wales	Brecon Corinthians, Cardiff Corinthians, Newport Corinthians
Ancient cities	Nineveh	Australia	Nineveh Eagles (former)
Ancient cities	Sparta	Anguilla	ALHCS Spartan
Ancient cities	Sparta	Australia	Blacktown Spartans
Ancient cities	Sparta	Czech Republic	Sparta Prague
Ancient cities	Sparta	England	Spartans F.C., Blyth Spartans, Spartans Youth, Brache Sparta
Ancient cities	Sparta	Hong Kong	Sparta Asia
Ancient cities	Sparta	Lithuania	Sparta Kaunas (defunct)
Ancient cities	Sparta	Malta	Ħamrun Spartans
Ancient cities	Sparta	Netherlands	Sparta Rotterdam, Nivo Sparta
Ancient cities	Sparta	Norway	Sparta Sarpsborg
Ancient cities	Sparta	Scotland	The Spartans
Ancient cities	Sparta	United States	Chicago Sparta, Philadelphia Spartans (defunct)
Ancient cities	Sparta	Wales	Mynydd Isa Spartans
Ancient cities	Troy	Bermuda	Somerset Trojans
Ancient cities	Troy	England	Trojans F.C. (defunct)
Ancient cities	Troy	Northern Ireland	Trojans F.C.
Asia	Named after the Asian continent.	Hong Kong	Sparta Asia
Atlantic Ocean	Named after the Atlantic	Dominican Republic	Atlántico
Atlantic Ocean	Named after the Atlantic	Lithuania	Atlantas Klaipeda (defunct)
Atlantic Ocean	Named after the Atlantic	Ukraine	Atlantyka Sevastopol (until 1986)
Atlantis	Named after the fictional island	Paraguay	Atlántida
Baltic Sea		Poland	Bałtyk Gdynia, Bałtyk Koszalin
Baltic Sea		Russia	FC Baltika Kaliningrad
Baltic Way	Named after the 1989 human chain	Lithuania	FK Baltija Panevėžys (defunct)
Black Sea	Cherno More in several Slavic languages	Bulgaria	Chernomorets Burgas, Cherno More Varna
Black Sea	Cherno More in several Slavic languages	Russia	Chernomorets Novorossiysk
Black Sea	Cherno More in several Slavic languages	Ukraine	Chornomorets Odesa, Chornomorets Sevastopol (until 2000)
Bukovina		Romania	Bucovina Pojorâta, Bucovina Rădăuți, Bucovina Suceava (defunct)
Bukovina		Ukraine	Bukovyna Chernivtsi
Cardiff Bay		Wales	Cardiff Bay Harlequins, Cardiff Bay Warriors
Carpathian Mountains		Poland	Karpaty Krosno
Carpathian Mountains		Romania	Carpaţi Baia Mare (until 1946)
Carpathian Mountains		Slovakia	Karpaty Limbach
Carpathian Mountains		Ukraine	Karpaty Halych, Karpaty Kolomyia, Karpaty Lviv, Karpaty Mukacheve, Karpaty Yaremche, Prykarpattia Ivano-Frankivsk
Danube river		Bulgaria	Dunav Ruse
Danube river		Uruguay	Danubio F.C.
Danube river		Ukraine	Dunayets Izmail (until 2006)
Dnieper River	Borysthenes is the ancient Greek name of the river, Slavutych is a poetic Ukrainian name	Belarus	Dnepr Mogilev, Dnepr Rogachev (until 2021)
Dnieper River	Borysthenes is the ancient Greek name of the river, Slavutych is a poetic Ukrainian name	Russia	Dnepr Smolensk
Dnieper River	Borysthenes is the ancient Greek name of the river, Slavutych is a poetic Ukrainian name	Soviet Union	Dnipro Kremenchuk (until 1970), Dniprovets Dniprodzerzhynsk (until 1967)
Dnieper River	Borysthenes is the ancient Greek name of the river, Slavutych is a poetic Ukrainian name	Ukraine	Borysfen Boryspil, Dnipro Cherkasy, Dnipro (defunct), Slavutych Cherkasy (until 2014)
Dniester River	Tyras is the ancient Greek name of the river	Moldova	Nistru Chișinău (until 1991), Tiligul-Tiras Tiraspol (until 2009), Nistru Otaci (defunct), Nistru Cioburciu (defunct)
Dniester River	Tyras is the ancient Greek name of the river	Ukraine	Dnister Zalishchyky, Dnistrovets Bilhorod-Dnistrovskyi, Dnister Ovidiopol (until 2011)
Fox River (Green Bay tributary)		United States	Fox River Rebels (defunct)
Guadalquivir River	Betis: Latin for Guadalquivir	Spain	Real Betis
Humber estuary		England	F.C. Humber United
Mount Ararat		Armenia	FC Ararat Yerevan, FC Ararat-Armenia
Mount Ararat		Estonia	FC Ararat Tallinn
Mount Ararat		France	AS Ararat Issy
Mount Ararat		Iran	F.C. Ararat Tehran
Mount Ararat		Russia	FC Ararat Moscow (defunct)
Mount Asama		Japan	Artista Asama
Mount Cameroon		Cameroon	Mount Cameroon FC
Mount Everest		Ecuador	Club Deportivo Everest
Mount Kenya		Kenya	Mt Kenya United
Oder		Poland	Odra Wodzisław, Odra Opole
Ore Mountains	German: Erzgebirge	Germany	FC Erzgebirge Aue
Pacific Ocean		Canada	Pacific FC
Polesia		Belarus	Polesye Kozenki, Polesie Mozyr (until 1994)
Polesia		Ukraine	Polissya Zhytomyr
Red River of the South		United States	Red River FC
River Finn (Foyle tributary)		Republic of Ireland	Finn Harps
River Liffey		Republic of Ireland	Liffey Wanderers
River Plate		Argentina	Club Atlético River Plate
River Plate		Aruba	SV River Plate Aruba
River Plate		Brazil	Sociedade Esportiva River Plate.
River Plate		Ecuador	River Ecuador (until 2017)
River Plate		Paraguay	Club River Plate (Asunción)
River Plate		Puerto Rico	River Plate Puerto Rico
River Plate		Uruguay	Club Atlético River Plate (Uruguay)
River Thames		England	Thames Association (defunct), Thames Polytechnic (defunct)
River Tolka		Republic of Ireland	Tolka Rovers
River Tyne		England	Tyne Association (defunct)
Rubicon	Named after the ancient river in Italy	Ukraine	Rubikon Kyiv
Siberia		Russia	FC Sibir Novosibirsk,
Silesia		Czech Republic	Slezský FC Opava
Silesia		Poland	Śląsk Wrocław
Ural Mountains		Russia	Ural Sverdlovsk
Velebit		Sweden	KF Velebit
Vistula		Poland	Wisła Kraków, Wisła Płock

== Animals ==
Topic	Meaning	Country	Clubs
Bantam	SC United Bantams take their name from their affiliate English club Bradford City, who are nicknamed The Bantams.	United States	SC United Bantams
Barracuda		Antigua and Barbuda	Antigua Barracuda (defunct)
Barracuda		United States	Pensacola Barracudas (defunct), RGV Barracudas
Bear		Australia	Weston Bears
Bear		(The Bahamas) Bahamas	Bears FC
Bear		United States	Boston Bears (defunct)
Bee		England	London Bees
Bee		Nigeria	Ranchers Bees
Bison		Lithuania	FC Stumbras (defunct)
Bluebird		Wales	Abertillery Bluebirds, Trethomas Bluebirds
Bobcat		United States	Maryland Bobcats
Bull		Australia	Fairfield Bulls
Bull		Jersey	Jersey Bulls
Bull		Mozambique	Associação Black Bulls
Bull		Vietnam	Hanoi Bulls
Bull		Wales	Bryngwran Bulls (defunct)
Caribou		United States	Caribous of Colorado (defunct)
Cat		United States	Chicago Cats (defunct)
Cheetah		Ghana	Cheetah F.C.
Cheetah		South Korea	LG Cheetahs
Cheetah		United States	Cincinnati Cheetahs (defunct)
Cobra		Australia	Adelaide Omonia Cobras
Cobra		Mexico	Club de Fútbol Cobras, C.F. Cobras de Querétaro (defunct)
Cobra		Ukraine	Kobra Kharkiv (defunct)
Cobra		United States	Carolina Elite Cobras, Chicago Cobras (defunct), Cleveland Cobras (defunct)
Colt		Australia	Coomera Colts
Colt		Bermuda	Devonshire Colts, St. George's Colts
Colt		England	Crowle Colts, Dosthill Colts (defunct)
Colt		Northern Ireland	Carryduff Colts
Colt		Scotland	Cumbernauld Colts
Colt		Wales	Castell Alun Colts
Condor		Australia	Western Condors
Condor		Germany	SC Condor Hamburg
Condor		United States	Arizona Condors (defunct), Santa Barbara Condors (defunct)
Cougar	Spanish: Puma, lit. 'Cougar'	Australia	Capricorn Cougars (defunct)
Cougar	Spanish: Puma, lit. 'Cougar'	Bermuda	Devonshire Cougars
Cougar	Spanish: Puma, lit. 'Cougar'	Honduras	Pumas UNAH
Cougar	Spanish: Puma, lit. 'Cougar'	Mexico	Pumas UNAM
Cougar	Spanish: Puma, lit. 'Cougar'	United States	Detroit Cougars (defunct), Kitsap Pumas (defunct), Lehigh Valley Cougars (defunct), Real Colorado Cougars
Deer		Lithuania	Elnias Šiauliai (defunct)
Dolphin		Democratic Republic of the Congo	AS Dauphins Noirs
Dolphin		(The Gambia) Gambia	Dolphins (former)
Dolphin		Nigeria	Dolphin F.C. (defunct)
Dolphin		Philippines	Dolphins United
Dragon		Australia	Darwin Dragons (defunct)
Dragon		Benin	AS Dragons FC de l'Ouémé
Dragon		Democratic Republic of the Congo	AS Dragons
Dragon		Japan	Ryutsu Keizai Dragons Ryugasaki
Dragon		Mexico	Dragones de Oaxaca
Dragon		New Zealand	Canterbury United Dragons (defunct)
Dragon		Portugal	Oriental Dragon (defunct)
Dragon		Sierra Leone	Golden Dragon
Dragon		United States	Burlingame Dragons (defunct)
Dragon		Wales	Baglan Dragons, Rhyl Dragons (defunct)
Duck		Australia	Deakin Ducks
Eagle		Australia	Southside Eagles
Eagle		Bermuda	Somerset Eagles
Eagle		Cambodia	Red Eagle FC
Eagle		Canada	Edmonton Eagles (defunct)
Eagle		Estonia	Tallinna FC Castovanni Eagles
Eagle		Grenada	Eagles Super Strikers
Eagle		India	Eagles FC
Eagle		Malawi	Blue Eagles, Eagle Strikers
Eagle		Maldives	Club Eagles
Eagle		Netherlands	Go Ahead Eagles
Eagle		Saint Kitts and Nevis	Dieppe Bay Eagles
Eagle		Sierra Leone	Kamboi Eagles
Eagle		Turks and Caicos Islands	Academy Eagles FC
Eagle		United States	Charlotte Eagles, New Jersey Eagles (defunct), New York Eagles (defunct)
Eagle		Zambia	Green Eagles F.C.
Eel		Solomon Islands	Henderson Eels
Egret		China	Xiamen Egret Island (defunct)
Elephant		Laos	Young Elephants
Falcon	Spanish: Halcones, lit. 'Falcons'	Canada	Toronto Falcons (2022–present), Toronto Falcons (1975–1982), Toronto Falcons (1967–1968)
Falcon	Spanish: Halcones, lit. 'Falcons'	Guatemala	Halcones FC (defunct)
Falcon	Spanish: Halcones, lit. 'Falcons'	Malta	Munxar Falcons
Falcon	Spanish: Halcones, lit. 'Falcons'	Mexico	Halcones de Morelos (defunct)
Falcon	Spanish: Halcones, lit. 'Falcons'	Montserrat	Bata Falcons
Falcon	Spanish: Halcones, lit. 'Falcons'	New Zealand	Nelson Falcons
Falcon	Spanish: Halcones, lit. 'Falcons'	Ukraine	Sokil Berezhany, Sokil Zolochiv, Sokil Lviv (defunct)
Falcon	Spanish: Halcones, lit. 'Falcons'	United Arab Emirates	Arabian Falcons, Elite Falcons
Falcon	Spanish: Halcones, lit. 'Falcons'	United States	Chicago Falcons (defunct), Newark Falcons (defunct), Orlando Falcons (defunct)
Flamingo		Bonaire	Atlétiko Flamingo
Flamingo		Botswana	Sua Flamingoes
Flamingo		Namibia	Flamingos F.C.
Fox		England	Loughborough Foxes
Fox		Germany	Füchse Berlin Reinickendorf
Fox		United States	Colorado Foxes, Real Colorado Foxes
Frog		United States	St. Louis Frogs
Gecko		United States	Sacramento Geckos (defunct)
Golden eagle		Ukraine	Berkut Bedevlia
Goose		United States	Blue Goose SC
Grasshopper		Scotland	Grasshoppers F.C. (defunct)
Grasshopper		Switzerland	Grasshopper Club Zurich
Gull		Japan	NHK Spring Yokohama FC Seagulls
Gull		Saint Lucia	Ciceron Seagulls United
Gull		Ukraine	Chaika Petropavlivska Borshchahivka, Chayka-VMS Sevastopol (defunct)
Gull		United States	Las Vegas Seagulls (defunct)
Harrier		England	Kidderminster Harriers, Halesowen Harriers (defunct), Morpeth Harriers (defunct)
Hawk	Icelandic: Haukar, lit. 'Hawks'	Australia	Holland Park Hawks
Hawk	Icelandic: Haukar, lit. 'Hawks'	England	Hawks F.C. (defunct)
Hawk	Icelandic: Haukar, lit. 'Hawks'	The Gambia	Hawks FC
Hawk	Icelandic: Haukar, lit. 'Hawks'	Iceland	Haukar
Hawk	Icelandic: Haukar, lit. 'Hawks'	United States	Michigan Hawks (defunct)
Hornet		Australia	Cessnock City Hornets
Hornet		Bermuda	Dandy Town Hornets
Hornet		England	Reading Hornets (defunct)
Ibis		Brazil	Íbis Sport Club
Iron Wolf	Mythological animal from the foundational legend of Vilnius	Lithuania	FK Geležinis Vilkas
Jaguar	Spanish: Jaguares, lit. 'Jaguars'	Colombia	Jaguares de Córdoba
Jaguar	Spanish: Jaguares, lit. 'Jaguars'	Mexico	Jaguares F.C.
Jaguar	Spanish: Jaguares, lit. 'Jaguars'	Poland	Jaguar Gdańsk
Jaguar	Spanish: Jaguares, lit. 'Jaguars'	United States	California Jaguars (defunct), Detroit Jaguars (defunct)
Kiwi		Samoa	Vailima Kiwi
Leopard		Australia	Marconi–Datsun Leopards
Leopard		Cameroon	Léopard Douala
Leopard		China	Xinjiang Tianshan Leopard (defunct)
Leopard		Eswatini	Royal Leopards
Leopard		Madagascar	Léopards de Transfoot
Leopard		Republic of the Congo	AC Léopards
Leopard		South Africa	Black Leopards
Leopard		Zambia	Nakambala Leopards
Lion	Swahili: Simba, lit. 'Lion'	Anguilla	Roaring Lions
Lion	Swahili: Simba, lit. 'Lion'	Australia	Essendon Lions (defunct), Preston Lions
Lion	Swahili: Simba, lit. 'Lion'	Barbados	St. Andrew Lions
Lion	Swahili: Simba, lit. 'Lion'	Botswana	Black Lions, Gilport Lions
Lion	Swahili: Simba, lit. 'Lion'	Cameroon	Inter Lion Ngoma, Lion Blessé
Lion	Swahili: Simba, lit. 'Lion'	China	Xiamen Blue Lions
Lion	Swahili: Simba, lit. 'Lion'	Democratic Republic of the Congo	AS Simba
Lion	Swahili: Simba, lit. 'Lion'	England	London City Lionesses, Millwall Lionesses, Maccabi London Lions
Lion	Swahili: Simba, lit. 'Lion'	Ghana	Heart of Lions
Lion	Swahili: Simba, lit. 'Lion'	Gibraltar	Lions Gibraltar
Lion	Swahili: Simba, lit. 'Lion'	Jamaica	Humble Lions
Lion	Swahili: Simba, lit. 'Lion'	Liberia	Red Lions FC
Lion	Swahili: Simba, lit. 'Lion'	Malawi	Red Lions FC
Lion	Swahili: Simba, lit. 'Lion'	Malta	Naxxar Lions, Sannat Lions
Lion	Swahili: Simba, lit. 'Lion'	Mongolia	BCH Lions
Lion	Swahili: Simba, lit. 'Lion'	Seychelles	The Lions FC
Lion	Swahili: Simba, lit. 'Lion'	Sierra Leone	East End Lions, FC Lion Pride
Lion	Swahili: Simba, lit. 'Lion'	Singapore	Lion City Sailors, LionsXII (defunct), Woodlands Lions, Young Lions
Lion	Swahili: Simba, lit. 'Lion'	Sri Lanka	Up Country Lions
Lion	Swahili: Simba, lit. 'Lion'	Tanzania	Simba S.C.
Lion	Swahili: Simba, lit. 'Lion'	Uganda	Simba FC
Lion	Swahili: Simba, lit. 'Lion'	United States	Orlando Lions (defunct), Ukrainian Lions
Lion	Swahili: Simba, lit. 'Lion'	Wales	Penyffordd Lions
Lynx		Canada	Toronto Lynx
Lynx		Gibraltar	Lynx F.C.
Lynx		United States	Adirondack Lynx
Magpie		Gibraltar	F.C. Magpies
Magpie		Jersey	Magpies F.C. (defunct)
Mallard		Northern Ireland	Fermanagh Mallards
Mamba		Eswatini	Green Mamba
Manatee		United States	Southwest Florida Manatees (defunct)
Moose		United States	Rochester City Moose (defunct)
Mosquito		England	Mosquitoes F.C. (defunct)
Mustang		Canada	Calgary Mustangs (2001–2004), Calgary Mustangs (1983)
Mustang		United States	Chicago Mustangs, Chicago Mustangs (1967–1968), Detroit Mustangs (defunct), Mile High Mustangs (defunct)
Ocelot		Mexico	Ocelotes UNACH (defunct)
Ocelot		United States	Rio Grande Valley Ocelots (defunct)
Otter		United States	Tri-Cities Otters (defunct)
Panthera		Australia	Monaro Panthers
Panthera		England	Panthers F.C. (formerly)
Panthera		Equatorial Guinea	The Panthers FC
Panthera		Pakistan	Panther Club (defunct)
Panthera		Ukraine	WFC Pantery Uman
Pegasus	Winged horse in Greek mythology, usually depicted as a white stallion	England	AFC Pegasus, Hereford Pegasus, Pegasus A.F.C. (defunct), Pegasus Athletic (defunct)
Pegasus	Winged horse in Greek mythology, usually depicted as a white stallion	Gibraltar	Europa Pegasus
Pegasus	Winged horse in Greek mythology, usually depicted as a white stallion	Hong Kong	Hong Kong Pegasus
Pelican		Nigeria	Pelican Stars
Phoenix	Named after the legendary bird from Greek mythology.	Argentina	Club Atlético Fénix
Phoenix	Named after the legendary bird from Greek mythology.	Australia	Altona East Phoenix, Brisbane Phoenix, South West Phoenix
Phoenix	Named after the legendary bird from Greek mythology.	Canada	Phénix de Saint-Joseph-du-Lac
Phoenix	Named after the legendary bird from Greek mythology.	China	Shenzhen Phoenix (defunct)
Phoenix	Named after the legendary bird from Greek mythology.	England	A.F.C. Phoenix, Phoenix Sports, Worplesdon Phoenix
Phoenix	Named after the legendary bird from Greek mythology.	Estonia	Jõhvi FC Phoenix
Phoenix	Named after the legendary bird from Greek mythology.	Germany	Berliner FC Phönix (defunct), FC Phönix Bellheim, 1. FC Phönix Lübeck
Phoenix	Named after the legendary bird from Greek mythology.	Gibraltar	Gibraltar Phoenix
Phoenix	Named after the legendary bird from Greek mythology.	Kosovo	FC Phoenix Banjë
Phoenix	Named after the legendary bird from Greek mythology.	Myanmar	Team Phoenix
Phoenix	Named after the legendary bird from Greek mythology.	New Zealand	Wellington Phoenix
Phoenix	Named after the legendary bird from Greek mythology.	Republic of Ireland	Phoenix F.C. Navan Road
Phoenix	Named after the legendary bird from Greek mythology.	Romania	Phoenix Ulmu, Phoenix Baia Mare (defunct)
Phoenix	Named after the legendary bird from Greek mythology.	Ukraine	Feniks-Illichovets Kalinine (defunct)
Phoenix	Named after the legendary bird from Greek mythology.	United States	GPS Portland Phoenix (defunct), Twin Cities Phoenix (defunct)
Phoenix	Named after the legendary bird from Greek mythology.	Uruguay	Centro Atlético Fénix
Phoenix	Named after the legendary bird from Greek mythology.	Wales	Penmaenmawr Phoenix
Piranha		United States	Virginia Beach Piranhas (defunct)
Python		United States	Portland Pythons (defunct)
Ram		Bermuda	North Village Rams
Ram		United States	Boston Rams (defunct)
Raven		Australia	Gladesville Ravens
Raven		United States	Rochester Ravens (defunct)
Rhinoceros		Australia	Riverina Rhinos (former)
Rhinoceros		Eswatini	Red Rhinos
Rhinoceros		United States	Rochester Rhinos (defunct)
Rhinoceros		Zimbabwe	Black Rhinos
Robin		England	Milton Keynes Robins (defunct)
Robin		Wales	Tondu Robins
Scorpion		Cameroon	Scorpion de Bey
Scorpion		(The Gambia) Gambia	Red Scorpion WFC
Scorpion		Gibraltar	Gibraltar Scorpions (defunct)
Scorpion		United States	San Antonio Scorpions (defunct), Syracuse Scorpions (defunct)
Seabird		Eswatini	Manzini Sea Birds
Seahorse		United States	Southern California Seahorses
Shark		Australia	Sutherland Sharks
Shark		Democratic Republic of the Congo	Sharks XI FC
Shark		Ghana	Elmina Sharks
Shark		Kenya	F.C. Kariobangi Sharks
Shark		Nigeria	Sharks F.C. (defunct)
Shark		Turks and Caicos Islands	SWA Sharks
Shark		United States	Eastern Shore Sharks (defunct), Miami Sharks (defunct), New England Sharks (defunct)
Shearwater	Symbol of the Soviet students' sport VSS Burevestnik	Russia	Burevestnik-YuRGUES Shakhty (defunct)
Shearwater	Symbol of the Soviet students' sport VSS Burevestnik	Soviet Union	Burevestnic Bender (until 1958), Burevestnic Chișinău (until 1958), Burevestnik Tomsk (until 1958), Burevisnyk Melitopol (until 1965)
Shearwater	Symbol of the Soviet students' sport VSS Burevestnik	Ukraine	Burevisnyk Ternopil (until 2007)
Stag		Australia	Toronto Awaba Stags
Stallion		Australia	Marconi Stallions
Stallion		Canada	Brampton Stallions (defunct)
Stallion		Mongolia	Central Stallions
Stallion		Papua New Guinea	Tusbab Stallions
Stallion		Philippines	Stallion Laguna F.C.
Stallion		United States	Buffalo Stallions, Las Vegas Stallions (defunct)
Stingray		Australia	Illawarra Stingrays
Stingray		United States	Rhode Island Stingrays (defunct)
Swallow		Eswatini	Mbabane Swallows
Swallow		Lesotho	Mazenod Swallows
Swallow		Malta	Dingli Swallows
Swallow		South Africa	Moroka Swallows
Swan		South Korea	Gangjin Swans
Swift		England	Walsall Town Swifts, Swifts F.C. (defunct)
Swift		New Zealand	Matamata Swifts
Swift		Northern Ireland	Dungannon Swifts
Swift		Wales	Llandudno Swifts
Terrier		England	Bedlington Terriers
Tiger	Spanish: Tigre, lit. 'Tiger'	Botswana	Great North Tigers
Tiger	Spanish: Tigre, lit. 'Tiger'	Cayman Islands	Tigers FC
Tiger	Spanish: Tigre, lit. 'Tiger'	China	Tianjin Jinmen Tiger
Tiger	Spanish: Tigre, lit. 'Tiger'	England	London Tigers
Tiger	Spanish: Tigre, lit. 'Tiger'	Guyana	Western Tigers
Tiger	Spanish: Tigre, lit. 'Tiger'	India	Kopa Tigers Birbhum
Tiger	Spanish: Tigre, lit. 'Tiger'	Italy	Tiger Brolo
Tiger	Spanish: Tigre, lit. 'Tiger'	Malawi	Mighty Tigers
Tiger	Spanish: Tigre, lit. 'Tiger'	Malta	Xewkija Tigers
Tiger	Spanish: Tigre, lit. 'Tiger'	Mexico	Tigres UANL
Tiger	Spanish: Tigre, lit. 'Tiger'	Sierra Leone	East End Tigers
Tiger	Spanish: Tigre, lit. 'Tiger'	South Africa	Bloemfontein Young Tigers
Tiger	Spanish: Tigre, lit. 'Tiger'	Wales	Menai Bridge Tigers
Toucan		United States	Twin City Toucans
Viper		Australia	Vipers FC
Viper		Ghana	Venomous Vipers
Viper		Uganda	Vipers SC
Viper		United States	Omaha Vipers (defunct), Staten Island Vipers (defunct)
Wasp		England	Chalfont Wasps, Crawley Wasps Women
Wasp		Wales	Clydach Wasps
Wildcat		United States	Connecticut Wildcats (defunct), Hershey Wildcats (defunct)
Wolf	The original Los Angeles Wolves were English side Wolverhampton Wanderers imported in to the 1967 United Soccer Association, and used their nickname "Wolves".	Australia	Wollongong Wolves
Wolf	The original Los Angeles Wolves were English side Wolverhampton Wanderers imported in to the 1967 United Soccer Association, and used their nickname "Wolves".	China	Xi'an Wolves (defunct)
Wolf	The original Los Angeles Wolves were English side Wolverhampton Wanderers imported in to the 1967 United Soccer Association, and used their nickname "Wolves".	Canada	St. Catharines Roma Wolves
Wolf	The original Los Angeles Wolves were English side Wolverhampton Wanderers imported in to the 1967 United Soccer Association, and used their nickname "Wolves".	Estonia	FC Jõgeva Wolves
Wolf	The original Los Angeles Wolves were English side Wolverhampton Wanderers imported in to the 1967 United Soccer Association, and used their nickname "Wolves".	Indonesia	Tangerang Wolves (defunct)
Wolf	The original Los Angeles Wolves were English side Wolverhampton Wanderers imported in to the 1967 United Soccer Association, and used their nickname "Wolves".	Nigeria	Warri Wolves
Wolf	The original Los Angeles Wolves were English side Wolverhampton Wanderers imported in to the 1967 United Soccer Association, and used their nickname "Wolves".	United States	Los Angeles Wolves, L.A. Wolves FC
Zebra		Bermuda	PHC Zebras
Zebra		Curaçao	C.V.C. Zebra's
Zebra		Timor-Leste	FC Zebra

== Plants ==
Topic	Meaning	Country	Clubs
Coconut		Cook Islands	PTC Coconuts
Heather		Ukraine	Veres Rivne
Oak		England	Goffs Oak
Oak		Ghana	Hearts of Oak
Oak		United States	San Jose Oaks
Pine		Australia	Frankston Pines
Pine		Finland	FC Honka
Rose		American Samoa	Black Roses FC
Rose		Australia	Adamstown Rosebuds
Rose	Bulgarian: Розова долина, romanized: Rozova dolina, lit. 'rose valley'	Bulgaria	Rozova Dolina
Rose		Canada	Roses FC
Rose		Scotland	Bonnyrigg Rose F.C., Linlithgow Rose F.C., Montrose Roselea F.C.
Rose		South Africa	Cape Town Roses, Roses United F.C.
Rose	The Portland Thorns name and logo intentionally reference its city's official nickname, "City of Roses".	United States	Portland Thorns, Roses F.C.
Shamrock	Symbol of Ireland.	Canada	Shamrocks TC
Shamrock	Symbol of Ireland.	Republic of Ireland	Shamrock Rovers
Shamrock	Symbol of Ireland.	United States	Boston Shamrock Rovers (defunct), South Carolina Shamrocks (defunct), St. Louis Shamrocks (defunct)
Sycamore		Ukraine	Yavir Krasnopillia
Thistle	National symbol of Scotland	England	Hereford Thistle (defunct)
Thistle	National symbol of Scotland	New Zealand	Auckland Thistle, Christchurch Thistle (defunct), Gisborne Thistle, Huntly Thistle, Invercargill Thistle, Timaru Thistle
Thistle	National symbol of Scotland	Scotland	Inverness Caledonian Thistle, Partick Thistle
Thistle	National symbol of Scotland	United States	Cleveland Thistles (defunct)
Timber	Generic term for wood	United States	Portland Timbers (1975–1982), Portland Timbers (1985–1990), Portland Timbers (2001–2010), Portland Timbers (2011-)

== Space ==
Topic	Meaning	Country	Clubs
Comet		Australia	Adelaide Comets
Comet		Botswana	Jwaneng Comets
Comet		Canada	Laval Comets (defunct)
Comet		Nigeria	Abia Comets
Comet		United States	Baltimore Comets (defunct), Colorado Comets (defunct)
Galaxy		Australia	Geelong Galaxy United
Galaxy		Botswana	Jwaneng Galaxy
Galaxy		Canada	Brantford Galaxy (defunct)
Galaxy		South Africa	TS Galaxy
Galaxy		United States	LA Galaxy
Galaxy		Vanuatu	ABM Galaxy
Moon		England	Lunar Rovers (defunct)
Orbit		Belarus	Orbita Minsk
Orbit		Soviet Union	Orbita Kzyl-Orda (until 1979)
Orbit		Ukraine	SKA-Orbita Lviv (defunct)
Space	Cosmos is a Greek name for the space	Russia	Kosmos Dolgoprudny, Kosmos Saint Petersburg (defunct), Kosmos Yegoryevsk (until 2004)
Space	Cosmos is a Greek name for the space	Ukraine	Kosmos Pavlohrad
Star	Звезда/Zvezda: East-Slavic for "star" Estrella - Spanish; Estrela - Portuguese. Étoile - French	Angola	Estrela Vermelha do Huambo
Star	Звезда/Zvezda: East-Slavic for "star" Estrella - Spanish; Estrela - Portuguese. Étoile - French	Aruba	SV Estrella
Star	Звезда/Zvezda: East-Slavic for "star" Estrella - Spanish; Estrela - Portuguese. Étoile - French	Australia	North Eastern MetroStars
Star	Звезда/Zvezda: East-Slavic for "star" Estrella - Spanish; Estrela - Portuguese. Étoile - French	Botswana	Sharps Shooting Stars
Star	Звезда/Zvezda: East-Slavic for "star" Estrella - Spanish; Estrela - Portuguese. Étoile - French	Brunei	Rimba Star
Star	Звезда/Zvezda: East-Slavic for "star" Estrella - Spanish; Estrela - Portuguese. Étoile - French	Cameroon	New Star de Douala
Star	Звезда/Zvezda: East-Slavic for "star" Estrella - Spanish; Estrela - Portuguese. Étoile - French	Canada	Toronto Shooting Stars (defunct)
Star	Звезда/Zvezda: East-Slavic for "star" Estrella - Spanish; Estrela - Portuguese. Étoile - French	Cape Verde	Seven Stars FF
Star	Звезда/Zvezda: East-Slavic for "star" Estrella - Spanish; Estrela - Portuguese. Étoile - French	Central African Republic	Red Star FC
Star	Звезда/Zvezda: East-Slavic for "star" Estrella - Spanish; Estrela - Portuguese. Étoile - French	Comoros	Etoile d'Or Mirontsy
Star	Звезда/Zvezda: East-Slavic for "star" Estrella - Spanish; Estrela - Portuguese. Étoile - French	Democratic Republic of the Congo	Etoile de Kivu
Star	Звезда/Zvezda: East-Slavic for "star" Estrella - Spanish; Estrela - Portuguese. Étoile - French	Egypt	Red Star Club
Star	Звезда/Zvezda: East-Slavic for "star" Estrella - Spanish; Estrela - Portuguese. Étoile - French	England	Ashington Rising Star, Burnley Union Star, Newcastle Blue Star, Peterborough Northern Star, Red Star Southampton, Seaham Red Star
Star	Звезда/Zvezda: East-Slavic for "star" Estrella - Spanish; Estrela - Portuguese. Étoile - French	France	Red Star Paris, Étoile des Deux Lacs (defunct), Paris Star (defunct), Star Club de Caudry (defunct)
Star	Звезда/Zvezda: East-Slavic for "star" Estrella - Spanish; Estrela - Portuguese. Étoile - French	French Indochina	Étoile de Giadinh (defunct)
Star	Звезда/Zvezda: East-Slavic for "star" Estrella - Spanish; Estrela - Portuguese. Étoile - French	Germany	Roter Stern Leipzig
Star	Звезда/Zvezda: East-Slavic for "star" Estrella - Spanish; Estrela - Portuguese. Étoile - French	Guinea	Étoile de Guinée, Fello Star, Kaloum Star
Star	Звезда/Zvezda: East-Slavic for "star" Estrella - Spanish; Estrela - Portuguese. Étoile - French	Honduras	Súper Estrella (defunct)
Star	Звезда/Zvezda: East-Slavic for "star" Estrella - Spanish; Estrela - Portuguese. Étoile - French	India	Lonestar Kashmir
Star	Звезда/Zvezda: East-Slavic for "star" Estrella - Spanish; Estrela - Portuguese. Étoile - French	Japan	Estrela Miyazaki (defunct)
Star	Звезда/Zvezda: East-Slavic for "star" Estrella - Spanish; Estrela - Portuguese. Étoile - French	Kenya	Coast Stars, Nairobi City Stars
Star	Звезда/Zvezda: East-Slavic for "star" Estrella - Spanish; Estrela - Portuguese. Étoile - French	Laos	Eastern Star (defunct)
Star	Звезда/Zvezda: East-Slavic for "star" Estrella - Spanish; Estrela - Portuguese. Étoile - French	Liberia	Ganta Black Stars, Monrovia Black Star
Star	Звезда/Zvezda: East-Slavic for "star" Estrella - Spanish; Estrela - Portuguese. Étoile - French	Malta	Vittoriosa Stars
Star	Звезда/Zvezda: East-Slavic for "star" Estrella - Spanish; Estrela - Portuguese. Étoile - French	Montenegro	FK Blue Star Podgorica
Star	Звезда/Zvezda: East-Slavic for "star" Estrella - Spanish; Estrela - Portuguese. Étoile - French	Mozambique	Estrela Vermelha (Beira)
Star	Звезда/Zvezda: East-Slavic for "star" Estrella - Spanish; Estrela - Portuguese. Étoile - French	Nepal	Three Star Club
Star	Звезда/Zvezda: East-Slavic for "star" Estrella - Spanish; Estrela - Portuguese. Étoile - French	Nigeria	Pelican Stars
Star	Звезда/Zvezda: East-Slavic for "star" Estrella - Spanish; Estrela - Portuguese. Étoile - French	Northern Ireland	Crumlin Star
Star	Звезда/Zvezda: East-Slavic for "star" Estrella - Spanish; Estrela - Portuguese. Étoile - French	Papua New Guinea	Eastern Stars (defunct)
Star	Звезда/Zvezda: East-Slavic for "star" Estrella - Spanish; Estrela - Portuguese. Étoile - French	Peru	Estrella Azul, White Star
Star	Звезда/Zvezda: East-Slavic for "star" Estrella - Spanish; Estrela - Portuguese. Étoile - French	Portugal	Estrela da Amadora, Estrela de Vendas Novas
Star	Звезда/Zvezda: East-Slavic for "star" Estrella - Spanish; Estrela - Portuguese. Étoile - French	Republic of the Congo	Étoile du Congo
Star	Звезда/Zvezda: East-Slavic for "star" Estrella - Spanish; Estrela - Portuguese. Étoile - French	Russia	Zvezda Irkutsk, Zvezda Perm, Zvezda Saint Petersburg
Star	Звезда/Zvezda: East-Slavic for "star" Estrella - Spanish; Estrela - Portuguese. Étoile - French	Saint Lucia	Northern United All Stars
Star	Звезда/Zvezda: East-Slavic for "star" Estrella - Spanish; Estrela - Portuguese. Étoile - French	Samoa	Goldstar Sogi (defunct)
Star	Звезда/Zvezda: East-Slavic for "star" Estrella - Spanish; Estrela - Portuguese. Étoile - French	Scotland	Solway Star (defunct)
Star	Звезда/Zvezda: East-Slavic for "star" Estrella - Spanish; Estrela - Portuguese. Étoile - French	Serbia	Red Star Belgrade
Star	Звезда/Zvezda: East-Slavic for "star" Estrella - Spanish; Estrela - Portuguese. Étoile - French	Seychelles	Red Star FC
Star	Звезда/Zvezda: East-Slavic for "star" Estrella - Spanish; Estrela - Portuguese. Étoile - French	Sierra Leone	Diamond Stars, Nepean Stars, Wusum Stars, Yambatui Stars
Star	Звезда/Zvezda: East-Slavic for "star" Estrella - Spanish; Estrela - Portuguese. Étoile - French	South Sudan	Young Stars
Star	Звезда/Zvezda: East-Slavic for "star" Estrella - Spanish; Estrela - Portuguese. Étoile - French	Sri Lanka	Blue Star
Star	Звезда/Zvezda: East-Slavic for "star" Estrella - Spanish; Estrela - Portuguese. Étoile - French	Switzerland	Blue Stars Zürich, FC Étoile-Sporting, Red Star Zürich
Star	Звезда/Zvezda: East-Slavic for "star" Estrella - Spanish; Estrela - Portuguese. Étoile - French	Tanzania	Singida Black Stars
Star	Звезда/Zvezda: East-Slavic for "star" Estrella - Spanish; Estrela - Portuguese. Étoile - French	Togo	Étoile Filante du Togo
Star	Звезда/Zvezda: East-Slavic for "star" Estrella - Spanish; Estrela - Portuguese. Étoile - French	Trinidad and Tobago	North East Stars
Star	Звезда/Zvezda: East-Slavic for "star" Estrella - Spanish; Estrela - Portuguese. Étoile - French	Ukraine	Zirka Kropyvnytskyi, Zorya Luhansk, Zoria Khorostkiv (defunct)
Star	Звезда/Zvezda: East-Slavic for "star" Estrella - Spanish; Estrela - Portuguese. Étoile - French	United States	Austin Lone Stars (defunct), Chicago Red Stars, New York/New Jersey MetroStars (formerly), Orange County Blue Star, Permian Basin Shooting Stars
Star	Звезда/Zvezda: East-Slavic for "star" Estrella - Spanish; Estrela - Portuguese. Étoile - French	Vanuatu	Erakor Golden Star
Star	Звезда/Zvezda: East-Slavic for "star" Estrella - Spanish; Estrela - Portuguese. Étoile - French	Venezuela	Estrella Roja
Star	Звезда/Zvezda: East-Slavic for "star" Estrella - Spanish; Estrela - Portuguese. Étoile - French	Wales	Treowen Stars
Star	Звезда/Zvezda: East-Slavic for "star" Estrella - Spanish; Estrela - Portuguese. Étoile - French	Zambia	Kalulushi Modern Stars, Mutondo Stars, NAPSA Stars

=== Planets ===
Topic	Meaning	Country	Clubs
Earth	Clubs named after the specific planet.	Japan	Hokkaido Tokachi Sky Earth
Neptune	Clubs named after the specific planet.	Lithuania	Neptūnas
Saturn	Clubs named after the specific planet.	Russia	Saturn Ramenskoye
Saturn	Clubs named after the specific planet.	United States	Saturn FC (defunct)
Venus	Clubs named after the specific planet.	(French Polynesia) Tahiti	Vénus

=== Stars ===
Topic	Meaning	Country	Clubs
Sirius	Clubs named after the specific star.	Lithuania	FK Sirijus Klaipėda
Sirius	Clubs named after the specific star.	Sweden	IK Sirius Fotboll
Sirius	Clubs named after the specific star.	Ukraine	Sirius Zhovti Vody (until 1995)
Sun	Clubs named after the specific star.	Australia	Goulburn Valley Suns
Sun	Clubs named after the specific star.	Japan	Sun Miyazaki (defunct)
Sun	Clubs named after the specific star.	Seychelles	Saint Louis Suns United
Sun	Clubs named after the specific star.	Sri Lanka	Super Sun
Sun	Clubs named after the specific star.	United States	Fort Lauderdale Sun (defunct), Tampa Bay Sun

=== Earth phenomena ===
Topic	Meaning	Country	Clubs
Avalanche		Canada	Hamilton Avalanche (defunct)
Avalanche		United States	Denver Avalanche (defunct)
Blizzard	Khurtovyna: Ukrainian for blizzard.	Canada	Calgary Blizzard, Toronto Blizzard (1986–1993), Toronto Blizzard (1971–1984)
Blizzard	Khurtovyna: Ukrainian for blizzard.	Ukraine	Hazovyk-Khurtovyna Komarno, Vykhor Dnipro
Blizzard	Khurtovyna: Ukrainian for blizzard.	United States	Buffalo Blizzard (defunct), Colorado Springs Blizzard (defunct)
Cyclone		Canada	Sudbury Cyclones (2024–), Sudbury Cyclones (1976–1980)
Cyclone		United States	Jacksonville Cyclones (defunct)
Earthquake		United States	San Jose Earthquakes, San Jose Earthquakes (1974–1988)
Hurricane		Grenada	Hurricanes SC
Hurricane		United States	Harmarville Hurricanes (defunct)
Lightning		England	Loughborough Lightning
Lightning		Malta	St. Venera Lightnings
Lightning		United States	Carolina Lightnin' (defunct), Dallas Lightning (defunct), Minnesota Lightning (defunct)
Monsoon		United States	Arizona Monsoon, Phoenix Monsoon
Rainbow		India	Rainbow AC
Rainbow		Malta	Tarxien Rainbows
Ray	Named after rays of (sun)light	Ukraine	Promin Sambir (until 1998)
Ray	Named after rays of (sun)light	Venezuela	Rayo Zuliano
Rip tide		Canada	Victoria Riptides (defunct)
Sky		Japan	Hokkaido Tokachi Sky Earth
Snow		United States	Pocono Snow (defunct)
Starlight		(The Gambia) Gambia	Starlight Banjul
Starlight		Mauritius	Curepipe Starlight
Storm		Canada	Calgary Storm (defunct), Durham Storm (defunct)
Storm		Mongolia	Storm FC
Storm		United States	F.C. Seattle Storm (defunct)
Sunrise		Ukraine	Nyva-Svitanok Vinnytsia (until 2008)
Sunset		Cayman Islands	Sunset FC
Sunset		Eswatini	Denver Sundowns
Sunset		South Africa	Mamelodi Sundowns
Thunder	Spanish: Rayo, lit. 'Thunderbolt' Rayo OKC were majority-owned by the owner of Rayo Vallecano.	Australia	South West Queensland Thunder
Thunder	Spanish: Rayo, lit. 'Thunderbolt' Rayo OKC were majority-owned by the owner of Rayo Vallecano.	Canada	Hamilton Thunder (defunct)
Thunder	Spanish: Rayo, lit. 'Thunderbolt' Rayo OKC were majority-owned by the owner of Rayo Vallecano.	Nepal	Pokhara Thunders
Thunder	Spanish: Rayo, lit. 'Thunderbolt' Rayo OKC were majority-owned by the owner of Rayo Vallecano.	Singapore	Eastern Thunder
Thunder	Spanish: Rayo, lit. 'Thunderbolt' Rayo OKC were majority-owned by the owner of Rayo Vallecano.	Spain	Rayo Vallecano
Thunder	Spanish: Rayo, lit. 'Thunderbolt' Rayo OKC were majority-owned by the owner of Rayo Vallecano.	United States	Minnesota Thunder (defunct), Rayo OKC (defunct)
Tide		Canada	Halifax Tides
Tide		United States	Maine Tide (defunct)
Tornado		Indonesia	Kendal Tornado
Tornado		Malta	Xgħajra Tornados
Tornado		Nigeria	Niger Tornadoes
Tornado		Ukraine	WFC Tornado Kyiv (defunct)
Tornado		United States	Dallas Tornado (defunct), DFW Tornados (defunct), Indiana Twisters (defunct), Tulsa Tornado's (defunct)
Tsunami		United States	Hawaii Tsunami (defunct)
Wave		Republic of Ireland	DLR Waves
Wave		United States	San Diego Wave

== Real or mythical people ==
Topic	Meaning	Country	Clubs
Achilles	In Greek mythology, Achilles was a hero of the Trojan War who was known as being the greatest of all the Greek warriors	England	Achilles F.C.
Achilles	In Greek mythology, Achilles was a hero of the Trojan War who was known as being the greatest of all the Greek warriors	Finland	Borgå Akilles
Achilles	In Greek mythology, Achilles was a hero of the Trojan War who was known as being the greatest of all the Greek warriors	Netherlands	Achilles '29, Achilles 1894, Achilles Veen
Ajax	Club names containing a reference to Ajax the Great or Ajax the Lesser. The South African and American clubs are so named due to their affiliation with AFC Ajax of the Netherlands.	Brazil	Ajax FC
Ajax	Club names containing a reference to Ajax the Great or Ajax the Lesser. The South African and American clubs are so named due to their affiliation with AFC Ajax of the Netherlands.	(Republic of the Congo) Congo	Ajax de Ouenzé
Ajax	Club names containing a reference to Ajax the Great or Ajax the Lesser. The South African and American clubs are so named due to their affiliation with AFC Ajax of the Netherlands.	Estonia	FC Ajax Lasnamäe
Ajax	Club names containing a reference to Ajax the Great or Ajax the Lesser. The South African and American clubs are so named due to their affiliation with AFC Ajax of the Netherlands.	Honduras	Unión Ájax
Ajax	Club names containing a reference to Ajax the Great or Ajax the Lesser. The South African and American clubs are so named due to their affiliation with AFC Ajax of the Netherlands.	Malta	Rabat Ajax
Ajax	Club names containing a reference to Ajax the Great or Ajax the Lesser. The South African and American clubs are so named due to their affiliation with AFC Ajax of the Netherlands.	Netherlands	AFC Ajax, Ajax Sportsman Combinatie
Ajax	Club names containing a reference to Ajax the Great or Ajax the Lesser. The South African and American clubs are so named due to their affiliation with AFC Ajax of the Netherlands.	South Africa	Ajax Cape Town (defunct)
Ajax	Club names containing a reference to Ajax the Great or Ajax the Lesser. The South African and American clubs are so named due to their affiliation with AFC Ajax of the Netherlands.	Suriname	VV Ajax (defunct)
Ajax	Club names containing a reference to Ajax the Great or Ajax the Lesser. The South African and American clubs are so named due to their affiliation with AFC Ajax of the Netherlands.	Ukraine	Ayaks Shakhtarsk
Ajax	Club names containing a reference to Ajax the Great or Ajax the Lesser. The South African and American clubs are so named due to their affiliation with AFC Ajax of the Netherlands.	United States	Ajax America Women, Ajax Orlando Prospects (defunct)
Alexei Stakhanov	Soviet miner who became the icon of the Stakhanovite movement	Soviet Union	Stakhanovets Kadiyivka (until 1945), Stakhanovets Stalino (until 1946)
Anatoliy Skoruk	Founder of the club	Ukraine	Skoruk Tomakivka
Andrea Doria		Italy	Società Andrea Doria (defunct), Sampdoria
Angel	Both Angel City FC and City of Angels FC are based in Los Angeles, and take their names from the city's nickname.	Botswana	Eleven Angels
Angel	Both Angel City FC and City of Angels FC are based in Los Angeles, and take their names from the city's nickname.	Canada	Edmonton Angels, Vancouver Angels (defunct)
Angel	Both Angel City FC and City of Angels FC are based in Los Angeles, and take their names from the city's nickname.	England	Tonbridge Angels
Angel	Both Angel City FC and City of Angels FC are based in Los Angeles, and take their names from the city's nickname.	Gibraltar	Angels (defunct)
Angel	Both Angel City FC and City of Angels FC are based in Los Angeles, and take their names from the city's nickname.	Liberia	Mighty Blue Angels
Angel	Both Angel City FC and City of Angels FC are based in Los Angeles, and take their names from the city's nickname.	Nigeria	Rivers Angels
Angel	Both Angel City FC and City of Angels FC are based in Los Angeles, and take their names from the city's nickname.	Uganda	Paidha Black Angels
Angel	Both Angel City FC and City of Angels FC are based in Los Angeles, and take their names from the city's nickname.	United States	Angel City FC, City of Angels FC, Wichita Blue Angels (defunct)
Apollo		Australia	Surfers Paradise Apollo
Apollo		Canada	Hamilton Apollos (defunct)
Apollo		Cyprus	Apollon Limassol
Apollo		England	Halewood Apollo
Apollo		Greece	Apollon Kalamarias, Apollon Athens
Apollo		New Zealand	Apollon AFC
Apollo		South Africa	Guild Apollo
Apollo		United States	Atlanta Apollos (defunct), New York Apollo (defunct)
Aris	After the Greek God of War.	Greece	Aris Thessaloniki
Aris	After the Greek God of War.	Cyprus	Aris Limassol
Aris	After the Greek God of War.	Luxembourg	Aris Bonnevoie
Aris	After the Greek God of War.	United States	LC Aris (defunct)
Argonauts	The Argonauts were a band of heroes in Greek mythology, who accompanied Jason in his quest to find the Golden Fleece.	England	Argonauts F.C. (defunct)
Arminius	Former Roman general, led a unified Germanic coalition to victory against the Roman Empire.	Germany	Arminia Bielefeld, Arminia Hannover, Arminia Ludwigshafen, Arminia Gütersloh (until 1978)
Ata	Club names containing a reference to Mustafa Kemal Atatürk, Turkish field marshal, revolutionary statesman, and founder of the Republic of Turkey.	Turkey	Ata Spor Kulubu
Atlas	Club names containing a reference to Atlas.	Mexico	Club Atlas
Atlas	Club names containing a reference to Atlas.	Argentina	Club Atlético Atlas
Banshee		United States	South Jersey Banshees (defunct)
Bartholomew Garelli	First student of Italian priest and Roman Catholic saint John Bosco in 1841.	Philippines	Don Bosco Garelli
Bavo of Ghent		Netherlands	VV Sint Bavo
Bernardino Caballero		Paraguay	General Caballero CG, General Caballero JLM, General Caballero ZC
Columba	Patron saint of Derry and one of the patron saints of Ireland along with Patrick and Brigid	Ireland	St Columb's Hall Celtic (defunct)
Columba	Patron saint of Derry and one of the patron saints of Ireland along with Patrick and Brigid	Northern Ireland	St Columb's Court (defunct)
Concordia	Concordia (meaning "concord" or "harmony" in Latin) is the Roman goddess who embodies agreement in marriage and society.	Canada	Montreal Concordia (defunct)
Concordia	Concordia (meaning "concord" or "harmony" in Latin) is the Roman goddess who embodies agreement in marriage and society.	Croatia	HŠK Concordia (defunct)
Concordia	Concordia (meaning "concord" or "harmony" in Latin) is the Roman goddess who embodies agreement in marriage and society.	Germany	Concordia Wilhelmsruh, Concordia Königsberg (defunct)
Concordia	Concordia (meaning "concord" or "harmony" in Latin) is the Roman goddess who embodies agreement in marriage and society.	Netherlands	DSV Concordia, RC & FC Concordia (defunct)
Concordia	Concordia (meaning "concord" or "harmony" in Latin) is the Roman goddess who embodies agreement in marriage and society.	Poland	Concordia Knurów, Concordia Piotrków Trybunalski
Concordia	Concordia (meaning "concord" or "harmony" in Latin) is the Roman goddess who embodies agreement in marriage and society.	Romania	Concordia Chiajna
Concordia	Concordia (meaning "concord" or "harmony" in Latin) is the Roman goddess who embodies agreement in marriage and society.	(Collectivity of Saint Martin) Saint-Martin	FC Concordia
Concordia	Concordia (meaning "concord" or "harmony" in Latin) is the Roman goddess who embodies agreement in marriage and society.	Switzerland	Concordia Basel
Crusaders		Canada	Canadian Crusaders
Crusaders		England	Crusaders F.C. (London) (defunct), Crusaders F.C. (Brentwood) (defunct), New Crusaders (defunct)
Crusaders		Northern Ireland	Crusaders F.C., Gilford Crusaders
Crusaders		Republic of Ireland	Letterkenny Crusaders
Crusaders		United States	Cape Cod Crusaders (defunct), Central Florida Crusaders (former)
Crusaders		Wales	Ynysddu Crusaders (defunct)
Druids	Celtic Priest	England	Wolverhampton Druids (defunct)
Druids	Celtic Priest	Wales	Cefn Druids
Erminio Giana	World War I fallen soldier from Gorgonzola	Italy	Giana Erminio
Evagoras Pallikarides	Greek-Cypriot poet and revolutionary for the Cypriot independence.	Cyprus	Pafos, Paphos (defunct)
Felix Dzerzhinsky	Soviet politician who led the Cheka and the OGPU	Soviet Union	Dzerzhinets Kolomna (until 1960), Dzerzhinets Leningrad (until 1948), Dzerzhinets Nizhny Tagil (until 1957), Dzerzhinets-STZ Stalingrad (until 1937), Dzerzhynets Kharkiv (until 1952), Dzerzhynets Voroshylovhrad (until 1953)
Fortuna	Latin goddess of fortune and personification of luck	Australia	Fortuna 60 SC
Fortuna	Latin goddess of fortune and personification of luck	Cameroon	AS Fortuna
Fortuna	Latin goddess of fortune and personification of luck	Denmark	Fortuna Hjørring
Fortuna	Latin goddess of fortune and personification of luck	Germany	Fortuna Düsseldorf, Fortuna Köln, Fortuna Babelsberg, Fortuna Chemnitz, Fortuna Magdeburg, TSV Fortuna Sachsenross, Fortuna 1894 Berlin (defunct)
Fortuna	Latin goddess of fortune and personification of luck	Netherlands	Fortuna Sittard, Fortuna Vlaardingen
Fortuna	Latin goddess of fortune and personification of luck	North Macedonia	KF Fortuna 1975
Fortuna	Latin goddess of fortune and personification of luck	Norway	AaFK Fortuna
Fortuna	Latin goddess of fortune and personification of luck	Romania	Fortuna Becicherecu Mic, Fortuna Covaci (defunct), Fortuna Poiana Câmpina (defunct)
Fortuna	Latin goddess of fortune and personification of luck	Russia	Fortuna Mytishchi (defunct)
Fortuna	Latin goddess of fortune and personification of luck	South Africa	FC Fortune (until 2006)
Fortuna	Latin goddess of fortune and personification of luck	Spain	CD Fortuna, Real Fortuna (defunct)
Fortuna	Latin goddess of fortune and personification of luck	Suriname	Fortuna 1975 Lelydorp
Fortuna	Latin goddess of fortune and personification of luck	Ukraine	Fortuna Sharhorod, Fortuna Shakhtarsk (until 2001)
Gil Vicente	Portuguese poet	Portugal	Gil Vicente F.C.
Grigory Petrovsky	Soviet politician and Communist Party leader in Ukraine.	Ukraine	Petrovets Dnipropetrovsk (until 1936)
Guglielmo Marconi		Australia	Marconi Stallions
Guillermo Brown		Argentina	Club Almirante Brown
Harlequin	Comic servant character (Zanni) from the Italian commedia dell'arte, associated with the city of Bergamo	England	Bemerton Heath Harlequins
Harlequin	Comic servant character (Zanni) from the Italian commedia dell'arte, associated with the city of Bergamo	Wales	Cardiff Grange Harlequins
Helios	Greek god who personifies the Sun	Estonia	Võru FC Helios
Helios	Greek god who personifies the Sun	Germany	SpVgg Helios München
Helios	Greek god who personifies the Sun	Ukraine	Helios Kharkiv
Hercules/Heracles	After the Greek demi-god.	Finland	JS Hercules
Hercules/Heracles	After the Greek demi-god.	Greece	Iraklis F.C.
Hercules/Heracles	After the Greek demi-god.	Honduras	C.D. Hércules
Hercules/Heracles	After the Greek demi-god.	Netherlands	Heracles Almelo, USV Hercules, MVV Alcides
Hercules/Heracles	After the Greek demi-god.	Norway	IF Herkules
Hercules/Heracles	After the Greek demi-god.	Spain	Hércules CF
Hercules/Heracles	After the Greek demi-god.	Turkey	İraklis J.K.
Hermes	Hermes is an Olympian deity in ancient Greek religion and mythology. In myth, Hermes functions as the messenger of the gods.	England	Hermes F.C. (defunct)
Hermes	Hermes is an Olympian deity in ancient Greek religion and mythology. In myth, Hermes functions as the messenger of the gods.	Kingdom of Yugoslavia	SK Hermes (defunct)
Hermes	Hermes is an Olympian deity in ancient Greek religion and mythology. In myth, Hermes functions as the messenger of the gods.	Netherlands	Hermes DVS
Hermes	Hermes is an Olympian deity in ancient Greek religion and mythology. In myth, Hermes functions as the messenger of the gods.	Scotland	Hermes F.C.
Hermes	Hermes is an Olympian deity in ancient Greek religion and mythology. In myth, Hermes functions as the messenger of the gods.	Turkey	Hermes Sport Club
Hermes	Hermes is an Olympian deity in ancient Greek religion and mythology. In myth, Hermes functions as the messenger of the gods.	Vatican City	SS Hermes
Hotspur	Named after Henry Percy, aka Harry Hotspur	England	Tottenham Hotspur
Hotspur	Named after Henry Percy, aka Harry Hotspur	Eswatini	Nsingizini Hotspurs
Hotspur	Named after Henry Percy, aka Harry Hotspur	Malta	Pietà Hotspurs, Victoria Hotspurs
Hotspur	Named after Henry Percy, aka Harry Hotspur	Saint Kitts and Nevis	Garden Hotspurs
Hotspur	Named after Henry Percy, aka Harry Hotspur	Scotland	Linton Hotspur
Hotspur	Named after Henry Percy, aka Harry Hotspur	United States	Fredericksburg Hotspur
Hotspur	Named after Henry Percy, aka Harry Hotspur	Wales	Holyhead Hotspur
Hotspur	Named after Henry Percy, aka Harry Hotspur	Zambia	Lime Hotspurs
Hristo Botev	Named after Hristo Botev, a Genius Bulgarian poet, revolutionary and a national hero of Bulgaria.	Bulgaria	PFC Botev Plovdiv
Ivan Mykhailov	Father of the founder of the club	Ukraine	Ivan Odesa
Joan of Arc		Mali	Jeanne d'Arc FC
Joan of Arc		Réunion	SS Jeanne d'Arc
Joan of Arc		Senegal	ASC Jeanne d'Arc
John Bosco	Catholic priest and saint of the Roman Catholic Church and the Anglican Communion	Democratic Republic of the Congo	CS Don Bosco
John Bosco	Catholic priest and saint of the Roman Catholic Church and the Anglican Communion	Dominican Republic	Don Bosco Jarabacoa
John Bosco	Catholic priest and saint of the Roman Catholic Church and the Anglican Communion	Germany	DJK Don Bosco Bamberg
John Bosco	Catholic priest and saint of the Roman Catholic Church and the Anglican Communion	Haiti	Don Bosco FC
John Bosco	Catholic priest and saint of the Roman Catholic Church and the Anglican Communion	Philippines	Don Bosco Garelli
John Bosco	Catholic priest and saint of the Roman Catholic Church and the Anglican Communion	Puerto Rico	Don Bosco FC
John Bosco	Catholic priest and saint of the Roman Catholic Church and the Anglican Communion	Sri Lanka	Don Bosco SC
Jomo Sono	Founder of the club	South Africa	Jomo Cosmos
Jorge Wilstermann	First Bolivian commercial pilot	Bolivia	Club Jorge Wilstermann
Lech	Named after Lech, legendary founder of Polish nation.	Poland	Lech Poznań, Lech Rypin
Luis Ángel Firpo	Argentine boxer	El Salvador	C.D. Luis Ángel Firpo
Mikhail Frunze	Soviet politician, military leader and military theorist.	Ukraine	Frunzenets-Liha-99 Sumy (defunct)
Nerthus	Germanic goddess of fertility.	Germany	Hertha BSC
Nike	Greek goddess of victory	Russia	Nika Moscow, Nika Krasny Sulin (defunct)
Nike	Greek goddess of victory	Sweden	GIF Nike
Nike	Greek goddess of victory	Ukraine	Nika Ivano-Frankivsk, WFC Nika Poltava (defunct)
Ninian	Christian saint, first mentioned in the 8th century as being an early missionary among the Pictish peoples of what is now Scotland	Scotland	Nairn St Ninian
Odysseus	Named after legendary Greek king and Homer's epic poem	Armenia	Ulisses FC
Odysseus	Named after legendary Greek king and Homer's epic poem	England	Ulysses F.C. (defunct)
Oleksa Dovbush	Famous Ukrainian outlaw and folk hero.	Ukraine	USC Dovbush Chernivtsi
Pilgrims		England	Pilgrims F.C. (defunct), The Pilgrims F.C. (defunct)
Pilgrims		Scotland	Pilgrims F.C. (defunct)
Pirates		Belize	San Pedro Pirates
Pirates		Eswatini	Moneni Pirates
Pirates		Namibia	Orlando Pirates S.C.
Pirates		South Africa	Orlando Pirates F.C.
Pirates		United States	Galveston Pirate
Pirates		Zimbabwe	Chegutu Pirates
Prometheus	Greek Titan and god of war	Russia	Prometey-Dynamo Saint Petersburg (until 1995)
Prometheus	Greek Titan and god of war	Ukraine	Prometei Dniprodzerzhynsk (defunct), Prometei Shakhtarsk (until 1993)
Pyotr Voykov	Soviet revolutionary and native of Kerch.	Ukraine	Voikovets Kerch (until 1994)
Rigas Feraios	Greek revolutionary raised in Velestino.	Greece	A.C. Rigas Feraios Velestino
Rio Branco	Named after the Baron of Rio Branco.	Brazil	Rio Branco Atlético Clube, Rio Branco Esporte Clube, Clube Esportivo Rio Branco, Rio Branco Sport Club
Rob Roy		Scotland	Kirkintilloch Rob Roy, Rob Roy F.C. (defunct)
Robin Hood		Suriname	SV Robinhood
Rose of Lima	Saint Rose is the patroness of the Americas, the indigenous people of the Americas, and of Peru (especially the city of Lima), Sittard in the Netherlands, of the Indies, and of the Philippines.	Peru	Club Deportivo Cultural Santa Rosa
Sachin Tendulkar	Named after the Indian Cricketer Sachin Tendulkar also known as Master Blaster.	India	Kerala Blasters
Saint George	Soldier in the Roman army in the 3rd and 4th centuries AD, venerated as a Christian martyr (see list of patronages).	England	Birmingham St George's (defunct), Chorley St George's (defunct)
Saint George	Soldier in the Roman army in the 3rd and 4th centuries AD, venerated as a Christian martyr (see list of patronages).	Ethiopia	Saint George SC
Saint George	Soldier in the Roman army in the 3rd and 4th centuries AD, venerated as a Christian martyr (see list of patronages).	Germany	SV St. Georg
Saint George	Soldier in the Roman army in the 3rd and 4th centuries AD, venerated as a Christian martyr (see list of patronages).	Isle of Man	St Georges A.F.C.
Saint George	Soldier in the Roman army in the 3rd and 4th centuries AD, venerated as a Christian martyr (see list of patronages).	Malta	St. George's F.C.
Saint George	Soldier in the Roman army in the 3rd and 4th centuries AD, venerated as a Christian martyr (see list of patronages).	Moldova	FC Sfîntul Gheorghe
Saint George	Soldier in the Roman army in the 3rd and 4th centuries AD, venerated as a Christian martyr (see list of patronages).	United States	Sons of St. George (defunct)
Saint Patrick	Saint Patrick was a fifth-century Romano-British Christian missionary and bishop in Ireland. He is also the patron saint of Nigeria.	Malta	Żabbar St. Patrick
Saint Patrick	Saint Patrick was a fifth-century Romano-British Christian missionary and bishop in Ireland. He is also the patron saint of Nigeria.	Republic of Ireland	St Patrick's Athletic
Saint Roch	Majorcan Catholic confessor, also called Rock in English	Seychelles	St Roch United
Saint Roch	Majorcan Catholic confessor, also called Rock in English	Scotland	St Roch's
Sam Mark	Club owner.	United States	Fall River F.C. (defunct)
Santa Claus		Finland	FC Santa Claus
Sergei Kirov	Soviet politician and revolutionary.	Russia	Kirovets Saint Petersburg (until 1992)
Sergei Kirov	Soviet politician and revolutionary.	Soviet Union	Kirovets Mogilev (until 1964)
Sergei Kirov	Soviet politician and revolutionary.	Ukraine	Kirovets Makiivka (defunct)
Skënderbeu	Named after the Albanian national hero Gjergj Kastrioti, also known as Skanderbeg.	Albania	Skënderbeu Korçë
Silvio Pettirossi		Paraguay	Club Silvio Pettirossi
Simón Bolívar	Venezuelan statesman that led the independence movement of what are currently the countries of Colombia, Venezuela, Ecuador, Peru, Panama and Bolivia.	Bolivia	Club Bolívar
Solomon		Ghana	King Solomon FC
Solomon		Solomon Islands	Solomon Kings
Spartacus	The famous leader of the slaves in the Third Servile War, a major slave uprising against the Roman Republic (c. 73–71 BCE).	Armenia	Spartak Yerevan (defunct)
Spartacus	The famous leader of the slaves in the Third Servile War, a major slave uprising against the Roman Republic (c. 73–71 BCE).	Azerbaijan	Spartak Guba (defunct)
Spartacus	The famous leader of the slaves in the Third Servile War, a major slave uprising against the Roman Republic (c. 73–71 BCE).	Bulgaria	Spartak Pleven, Spartak Plovdiv, Spartak Sofia (defunct), Spartak Varna
Spartacus	The famous leader of the slaves in the Third Servile War, a major slave uprising against the Roman Republic (c. 73–71 BCE).	Cape Verde	Spartak d'Aguadinha
Spartacus	The famous leader of the slaves in the Third Servile War, a major slave uprising against the Roman Republic (c. 73–71 BCE).	England	Barnt Green Spartak (former)
Spartacus	The famous leader of the slaves in the Third Servile War, a major slave uprising against the Roman Republic (c. 73–71 BCE).	(Georgia (country)) Georgia	Spartaki Tskhinvali
Spartacus	The famous leader of the slaves in the Third Servile War, a major slave uprising against the Roman Republic (c. 73–71 BCE).	Hungary	Budapesti Spartacus (defunct)
Spartacus	The famous leader of the slaves in the Third Servile War, a major slave uprising against the Roman Republic (c. 73–71 BCE).	Kazakhstan	Spartak Semey
Spartacus	The famous leader of the slaves in the Third Servile War, a major slave uprising against the Roman Republic (c. 73–71 BCE).	Latvia	Spartaks Jūrmala
Spartacus	The famous leader of the slaves in the Third Servile War, a major slave uprising against the Roman Republic (c. 73–71 BCE).	Russia	Spartak Moscow, Spartak Nalchik, Spartak-Alania Vladikavkaz, Spartak Kostroma, Spartak Tambov, Spartak Yoshkar-Ola, Spartak Gorno-Altaysk (defunct)
Spartacus	The famous leader of the slaves in the Third Servile War, a major slave uprising against the Roman Republic (c. 73–71 BCE).	Serbia	Spartak Subotica, FK Spartak Ljig, Spartak Zlatibor Voda
Spartacus	The famous leader of the slaves in the Third Servile War, a major slave uprising against the Roman Republic (c. 73–71 BCE).	Slovakia	Spartak Trnava
Spartacus	The famous leader of the slaves in the Third Servile War, a major slave uprising against the Roman Republic (c. 73–71 BCE).	Soviet Union	Spartak Dnipropetrovsk (defunct), Spartak Kharkiv (defunct), Spartak Lviv (defunct), Spartak Odesa (until 1941), Spartak Sambir (until 1991), Spartak Sumy (until 1971), Spartak Uzzhorod (until 1960)
Spartacus	The famous leader of the slaves in the Third Servile War, a major slave uprising against the Roman Republic (c. 73–71 BCE).	Ukraine	HU ZIDMU-Spartak Zaporizhzhia (defunct), Spartak Ivano-Frankivsk (defunct), Spartak Sumy (defunct), WFC Spartak Chernihiv (defunct)
Titan	Named after the race of Greek pre-Olympian gods.	Mexico	Titanes de Saltillo (defunct), Titanes de Tulancingo (defunct)
Titan	Named after the race of Greek pre-Olympian gods.	Russia	Titan Klin
Titan	Named after the race of Greek pre-Olympian gods.	El Salvador	C.D. Titán
Titan	Named after the race of Greek pre-Olympian gods.	Ukraine	Tytan Donetsk
Titan	Named after the race of Greek pre-Olympian gods.	Venezuela	Titanes F.C.
Vampire		England	Crouch End Vampires
Vasco da Gama	Named after Portuguese explorer Vasco da Gama.	Bermuda	Clube Vasco da Gama Bermuda
Vasco da Gama	Named after Portuguese explorer Vasco da Gama.	Brazil	Club de Regatas Vasco da Gama, Associação Desportiva Vasco da Gama
Vasco da Gama	Named after Portuguese explorer Vasco da Gama.	India	Vasco SC
Vasco da Gama	Named after Portuguese explorer Vasco da Gama.	Nigeria	NITEL Vasco Da Gama (defunct)
Vasco da Gama	Named after Portuguese explorer Vasco da Gama.	Portugal	Vasco da Gama Vidigueira
Vasco da Gama	Named after Portuguese explorer Vasco da Gama.	South Africa	Vasco da Gama (South Africa)
Vasco da Gama	Named after Portuguese explorer Vasco da Gama.	United States	Bridgeport Vasco da Gama
Vasil Levski	Named after Vasil Levski, Bulgarian revolutionary and a national hero of Bulgaria.	Bulgaria	Levski Sofia
Vasily Bazhanov	Soviet mining engineer who gave his name to Bazhanov coal mine.	Ukraine	Bazhanovets Makiivka (until 1995)
Veles	An old Slavic God	Russia	Veles
Victoria	Named after Queen Victoria.	England	Northwich Victoria, Biddulph Victoria
Victoria	Named after Queen Victoria.	Wales	Brymbo Victoria, Rhostyllen Victoria (defunct), Wrexham Victoria (defunct)
Vikings		England	Viking Greenford (defunct)
Vikings		Faroe Islands	Víkingur Gøta
Vikings		Finland	FC Viikingit
Vikings		Iceland	Knattspyrnufélagið Víkingur, Ungmennafélagið Víkingur
Vikings		Norway	Viking FK
Vikings		Taiwan	F.C. Vikings
Vikings		United States	San Francisco Vikings
Viktor Oharenko	Owner of the Classic Private University and of the football club	Ukraine	Viktor Zaporizhia (until 2000)
Vladimir Lenin	Named after the Soviet revolutionary Vladimir Ilyich Lenin.	Ukraine	Feniks-Illichovets Kalinine (defunct), Illichivets Mariupol (until 2017)
Willem II	King of the Netherlands from 1840 to 1849	Netherlands	Willem II
Zawisza	Named after Zawisza Czarny, Polish knight and nobleman.	Poland	Zawisza Bydgoszcz
Zico		Brazil	Centro de Futebol Zico Sociedade Esportiva

== Sport ==
Topic	Meaning	Country	Clubs
Actions	Ruch in Polish means "movement". En avant, Vorwärts and Naprzód means "forward" in French, German and Polish, respectively.	Austria	Rapid Wien, Vorwärts Steyr
Actions	Ruch in Polish means "movement". En avant, Vorwärts and Naprzód means "forward" in French, German and Polish, respectively.	France	En Avant Guingamp
Actions	Ruch in Polish means "movement". En avant, Vorwärts and Naprzód means "forward" in French, German and Polish, respectively.	Gabon	En Avant Estuaire
Actions	Ruch in Polish means "movement". En avant, Vorwärts and Naprzód means "forward" in French, German and Polish, respectively.	India	Forward Club Agartala
Actions	Ruch in Polish means "movement". En avant, Vorwärts and Naprzód means "forward" in French, German and Polish, respectively.	Netherlands	Go Ahead Eagles
Actions	Ruch in Polish means "movement". En avant, Vorwärts and Naprzód means "forward" in French, German and Polish, respectively.	Poland	Naprzód Jędziejów, Ruch Chorzów, Ruch Radzionków, Ruch Wysokie Mazowieckie, Ruch Zdzieszowice
Actions	Ruch in Polish means "movement". En avant, Vorwärts and Naprzód means "forward" in French, German and Polish, respectively.	Sweden	BK Forward
Actions	Ruch in Polish means "movement". En avant, Vorwärts and Naprzód means "forward" in French, German and Polish, respectively.	Ukraine	Rukh Lviv, Start Chuhuiv
Actions	Ruch in Polish means "movement". En avant, Vorwärts and Naprzód means "forward" in French, German and Polish, respectively.	United States	Forward Madison
Amateur	Clubs originating in amateur status teams.	England	Salford Amateurs, Yorkshire Amateur
Amateur	Clubs originating in amateur status teams.	France	Football Amateur Club de Nice 1920
Amateur	Clubs originating in amateur status teams.	Germany	SC Berliner Amateure
Amateur	Clubs originating in amateur status teams.	Northern Ireland	Carniny Amateur & Youth F.C.
Amateur	Clubs originating in amateur status teams.	Scotland	Arbroath Amateurs
Amateur	Clubs originating in amateur status teams.	Wales	Blaenau Ffestiniog Amateur
Athletics	Club names containing a reference to athletes or athletics. In the United States, the term "athletics" refers to sport in general. See also sports societies section.	Andorra	CF Atlètic Amèrica, Atlètic Club d'Escaldes
Athletics	Club names containing a reference to athletes or athletics. In the United States, the term "athletics" refers to sport in general. See also sports societies section.	Angola	Petro Atlético
Athletics	Club names containing a reference to athletes or athletics. In the United States, the term "athletics" refers to sport in general. See also sports societies section.	Belgium	Koninklijke Atletiek Associatie Gent
Athletics	Club names containing a reference to athletes or athletics. In the United States, the term "athletics" refers to sport in general. See also sports societies section.	Bermuda	Bermuda Athletic Association Wanderers
Athletics	Club names containing a reference to athletes or athletics. In the United States, the term "athletics" refers to sport in general. See also sports societies section.	Bhutan	Druk Athletic
Athletics	Club names containing a reference to athletes or athletics. In the United States, the term "athletics" refers to sport in general. See also sports societies section.	Bonaire	Atlétiko Flamingo, Atlétiko Tera Corá
Athletics	Club names containing a reference to athletes or athletics. In the United States, the term "athletics" refers to sport in general. See also sports societies section.	Brazil	Atlético Mineiro, Atlético Paranaense
Athletics	Club names containing a reference to athletes or athletics. In the United States, the term "athletics" refers to sport in general. See also sports societies section.	Burundi	Atlético Olympic
Athletics	Club names containing a reference to athletes or athletics. In the United States, the term "athletics" refers to sport in general. See also sports societies section.	Cameroon	Douala Athletic Club
Athletics	Club names containing a reference to athletes or athletics. In the United States, the term "athletics" refers to sport in general. See also sports societies section.	Canada	Atlético Ottawa, Athletic Club of British Columbia (defunct)
Athletics	Club names containing a reference to athletes or athletics. In the United States, the term "athletics" refers to sport in general. See also sports societies section.	Cayman Islands	Cayman Athletic
Athletics	Club names containing a reference to athletes or athletics. In the United States, the term "athletics" refers to sport in general. See also sports societies section.	Colombia	Atlético Nacional, Atlético Bucaramanga
Athletics	Club names containing a reference to athletes or athletics. In the United States, the term "athletics" refers to sport in general. See also sports societies section.	England	Charlton Athletic, Oldham Athletic, Wigan Athletic
Athletics	Club names containing a reference to athletes or athletics. In the United States, the term "athletics" refers to sport in general. See also sports societies section.	Equatorial Guinea	Atlético Malabo, Atlético Semu
Athletics	Club names containing a reference to athletes or athletics. In the United States, the term "athletics" refers to sport in general. See also sports societies section.	France	Cercle Athlétique de Paris-Charenton
Athletics	Club names containing a reference to athletes or athletics. In the United States, the term "athletics" refers to sport in general. See also sports societies section.	Guinea	Athlético de Coléah
Athletics	Club names containing a reference to athletes or athletics. In the United States, the term "athletics" refers to sport in general. See also sports societies section.	Hungary	Magyar Atlétikai Club
Athletics	Club names containing a reference to athletes or athletics. In the United States, the term "athletics" refers to sport in general. See also sports societies section.	India	Atlético de Kolkata
Athletics	Club names containing a reference to athletes or athletics. In the United States, the term "athletics" refers to sport in general. See also sports societies section.	Ireland	North End Athletic (defunct)
Athletics	Club names containing a reference to athletes or athletics. In the United States, the term "athletics" refers to sport in general. See also sports societies section.	Isle of Man	Northern Athletic (defunct)
Athletics	Club names containing a reference to athletes or athletics. In the United States, the term "athletics" refers to sport in general. See also sports societies section.	Japan	Atletico Suzuka Club
Athletics	Club names containing a reference to athletes or athletics. In the United States, the term "athletics" refers to sport in general. See also sports societies section.	Lebanon	Athletico SC
Athletics	Club names containing a reference to athletes or athletics. In the United States, the term "athletics" refers to sport in general. See also sports societies section.	Lithuania	FK Atletas Kaunas
Athletics	Club names containing a reference to athletes or athletics. In the United States, the term "athletics" refers to sport in general. See also sports societies section.	Malta	Lija Athletic, Pembroke Athleta, Senglea Athletic
Athletics	Club names containing a reference to athletes or athletics. In the United States, the term "athletics" refers to sport in general. See also sports societies section.	Mozambique	Atlético Muçulmano da Matola
Athletics	Club names containing a reference to athletes or athletics. In the United States, the term "athletics" refers to sport in general. See also sports societies section.	New Zealand	Whanganui Athletic
Athletics	Club names containing a reference to athletes or athletics. In the United States, the term "athletics" refers to sport in general. See also sports societies section.	Northern Ireland	Cliftonville Football & Athletic Club, Linfield Athletic
Athletics	Club names containing a reference to athletes or athletics. In the United States, the term "athletics" refers to sport in general. See also sports societies section.	Pakistan	PMC Club Athletico Faisalabad (defunct)
Athletics	Club names containing a reference to athletes or athletics. In the United States, the term "athletics" refers to sport in general. See also sports societies section.	Peru	Alianza Atlético
Athletics	Club names containing a reference to athletes or athletics. In the United States, the term "athletics" refers to sport in general. See also sports societies section.	Portugal	Atlético C.P., União Atlético Povoense, Clube Atlético Ouriense
Athletics	Club names containing a reference to athletes or athletics. In the United States, the term "athletics" refers to sport in general. See also sports societies section.	Republic of Ireland	Rathmines Athletic (defunct), St Patrick's Athletic
Athletics	Club names containing a reference to athletes or athletics. In the United States, the term "athletics" refers to sport in general. See also sports societies section.	Romania	AFC Atletico Vaslui
Athletics	Club names containing a reference to athletes or athletics. In the United States, the term "athletics" refers to sport in general. See also sports societies section.	Scotland	Dunfermline Athletic, Forfar Athletic, Alloa Athletic, Annan Athletic
Athletics	Club names containing a reference to athletes or athletics. In the United States, the term "athletics" refers to sport in general. See also sports societies section.	Spain	Athletic Bilbao, Atlético Madrid
Athletics	Club names containing a reference to athletes or athletics. In the United States, the term "athletics" refers to sport in general. See also sports societies section.	Timor-Leste	Atlético Ultramar
Athletics	Club names containing a reference to athletes or athletics. In the United States, the term "athletics" refers to sport in general. See also sports societies section.	Trinidad and Tobago	Athletic Club of Port of Spain
Athletics	Club names containing a reference to athletes or athletics. In the United States, the term "athletics" refers to sport in general. See also sports societies section.	United States	Hartford Athletic, New York Athletic Club, Athletic Club of St. Louis (defunct)
Athletics	Club names containing a reference to athletes or athletics. In the United States, the term "athletics" refers to sport in general. See also sports societies section.	Venezuela	Atlético Venezuela (defunct)
Athletics	Club names containing a reference to athletes or athletics. In the United States, the term "athletics" refers to sport in general. See also sports societies section.	Wales	Bethesda Athletic, Wrexham Athletic
Athletics	Club names containing a reference to athletes or athletics. In the United States, the term "athletics" refers to sport in general. See also sports societies section.	Zambia	Atletico Lusaka
Baseball		Lithuania	FBK Kaunas (defunct)
Boxing		Argentina	Atlético Boxing Club
Casuals	Clubs originating in amateur status teams. Corinthian-Casuals were formed by the merger of Corinthian F.C. and Casuals F.C. in 1939.	Australia	Sutherland Shire Casuals
Casuals	Clubs originating in amateur status teams. Corinthian-Casuals were formed by the merger of Corinthian F.C. and Casuals F.C. in 1939.	England	Corinthian-Casuals F.C., Casuals F.C. (defunct), Colchester Casuals (defunct) Walton Casuals (defunct), Wolverhampton Casuals
Casuals	Clubs originating in amateur status teams. Corinthian-Casuals were formed by the merger of Corinthian F.C. and Casuals F.C. in 1939.	Scotland	Edinburgh Casuals (defunct)
Casuals	Clubs originating in amateur status teams. Corinthian-Casuals were formed by the merger of Corinthian F.C. and Casuals F.C. in 1939.	Spain	Casual SC (defunct)
Cricket	Club names containing a term for cricket. Usually, the club also had a cricket team in the past.	Argentina	Buenos Aires Cricket & Rugby Club
Cricket	Club names containing a term for cricket. Usually, the club also had a cricket team in the past.	Austria	Vienna Cricket and Football-Club
Cricket	Club names containing a term for cricket. Usually, the club also had a cricket team in the past.	Bermuda	Somerset Cricket Club Trojans
Cricket	Club names containing a term for cricket. Usually, the club also had a cricket team in the past.	Brazil	Rio Cricket
Cricket	Club names containing a term for cricket. Usually, the club also had a cricket team in the past.	Denmark	Fredericia Studenternes Kricketklub
Cricket	Club names containing a term for cricket. Usually, the club also had a cricket team in the past.	Italy	Genoa Cricket and Football Club, Milan Foot-Ball and Cricket Club
Cricket	Club names containing a term for cricket. Usually, the club also had a cricket team in the past.	India	Calcutta Cricket and Football Club
Cricket	Club names containing a term for cricket. Usually, the club also had a cricket team in the past.	Mexico	Mexico Cricket Club (defunct)
Cricket	Club names containing a term for cricket. Usually, the club also had a cricket team in the past.	Northern Ireland	Derriaghy Cricket Club F.C.
Cricket	Club names containing a term for cricket. Usually, the club also had a cricket team in the past.	Peru	Lima Cricket and Football Club
Cricket	Club names containing a term for cricket. Usually, the club also had a cricket team in the past.	Scotland	Derby Cricket and Football Club (defunct)
Cricket	Club names containing a term for cricket. Usually, the club also had a cricket team in the past.	Singapore	Singapore Cricket Club
Cricket	Club names containing a term for cricket. Usually, the club also had a cricket team in the past.	Spain	Cricket and Football Club of Madrid (defunct)
Cricket	Club names containing a term for cricket. Usually, the club also had a cricket team in the past.	Switzerland	Lausanne Football and Cricket Club (defunct)
Cricket	Club names containing a term for cricket. Usually, the club also had a cricket team in the past.	Uruguay	Central Uruguay Railway Cricket Club (defunct)
Cricket	Club names containing a term for cricket. Usually, the club also had a cricket team in the past.	Wales	Brymbo Institute Cricket and Football Club (defunct)
Fencing		Argentina	Gimnasia y Esgrima de Jujuy, Gimnasia y Esgrima La Plata
Golf		Mexico	San Pedro Golf Club (defunct)
Gymnastics	These clubs usually have a historical affiliation with gymnastics.	Argentina	Gimnasia y Esgrima de Jujuy, Gimnasia y Esgrima La Plata, Gimnasia y Tiro de Salta
Gymnastics	These clubs usually have a historical affiliation with gymnastics.	England	The Gymnastic Society (defunct)
Gymnastics	These clubs usually have a historical affiliation with gymnastics.	France	Olympique Gymnaste Club de Nice-Côte d'Azur
Gymnastics	These clubs usually have a historical affiliation with gymnastics.	Germany	Turn- und Sportgemeinschaft 1899 Hoffenheim
Gymnastics	These clubs usually have a historical affiliation with gymnastics.	Honduras	Gimnástico F.C.
Gymnastics	These clubs usually have a historical affiliation with gymnastics.	Lithuania	LGSF Kaunas
Gymnastics	These clubs usually have a historical affiliation with gymnastics.	Norway	Larvik Turn & I.F.
Gymnastics	These clubs usually have a historical affiliation with gymnastics.	Portugal	Ginásio de Alcobaça, Lusitano Ginásio Clube Moncarapachense, Ginásio Clube Figueirense
Gymnastics	These clubs usually have a historical affiliation with gymnastics.	Scotland	Hamilton Gymnasium (defunct)
Gymnastics	These clubs usually have a historical affiliation with gymnastics.	Spain	Gimnàstic de Tarragona, Gimnástica de Torrelavega
Gymnastics	These clubs usually have a historical affiliation with gymnastics.	Turkey	Beşiktaş Jimnastik Kulübü
Gymnastics	These clubs usually have a historical affiliation with gymnastics.	Wales	Wrexham Gymnasium (defunct)
Lacrosse		Scotland	Govanhill Lacrosse (defunct)
Leader		Ukraine	WFC Lider Kobeliaky
Olympic Games	Club names containing a reference to either the Olympic Games or the ancient city of Olympia, Greece.	Albania	KF Olimpic (defunct)
Olympic Games	Club names containing a reference to either the Olympic Games or the ancient city of Olympia, Greece.	Australia	Adelaide Olympic, Olympic FC, Sydney Olympic, Traralgon Olympians
Olympic Games	Club names containing a reference to either the Olympic Games or the ancient city of Olympia, Greece.	Azerbaijan	FK Olimpik Baku
Olympic Games	Club names containing a reference to either the Olympic Games or the ancient city of Olympia, Greece.	Belgium	Olympia Bruxelles, Olympic Charleroi
Olympic Games	Club names containing a reference to either the Olympic Games or the ancient city of Olympia, Greece.	Bulgaria	Olympic Varna
Olympic Games	Club names containing a reference to either the Olympic Games or the ancient city of Olympia, Greece.	Burundi	Atlético Olympic
Olympic Games	Club names containing a reference to either the Olympic Games or the ancient city of Olympia, Greece.	Cameroon	Olympic Mvolyé
Olympic Games	Club names containing a reference to either the Olympic Games or the ancient city of Olympia, Greece.	Canada	Montreal Olympique (defunct), Toronto Olympians (defunct)
Olympic Games	Club names containing a reference to either the Olympic Games or the ancient city of Olympia, Greece.	Egypt	Olympic Club
Olympic Games	Club names containing a reference to either the Olympic Games or the ancient city of Olympia, Greece.	England	Blackburn Olympic (defunct), Notts Olympic (defunct), Olympic F.C. (defunct), Rushall Olympic
Olympic Games	Club names containing a reference to either the Olympic Games or the ancient city of Olympia, Greece.	France	Nîmes Olympique, Olympique Lyonnais, Olympique Marseille
Olympic Games	Club names containing a reference to either the Olympic Games or the ancient city of Olympia, Greece.	Gabon	Olympique de Mandji
Olympic Games	Club names containing a reference to either the Olympic Games or the ancient city of Olympia, Greece.	Germany	Olympia Neugablonz
Olympic Games	Club names containing a reference to either the Olympic Games or the ancient city of Olympia, Greece.	Ghana	Accra Great Olympics
Olympic Games	Club names containing a reference to either the Olympic Games or the ancient city of Olympia, Greece.	Greece	Olympiacos F.C., Olympiacos Volos
Olympic Games	Club names containing a reference to either the Olympic Games or the ancient city of Olympia, Greece.	Guinea	Flamme Olympique
Olympic Games	Club names containing a reference to either the Olympic Games or the ancient city of Olympia, Greece.	Honduras	CD Olimpia
Olympic Games	Club names containing a reference to either the Olympic Games or the ancient city of Olympia, Greece.	Ireland	Derry Olympic (defunct)
Olympic Games	Club names containing a reference to either the Olympic Games or the ancient city of Olympia, Greece.	Italy	Olimpia Colligiana
Olympic Games	Club names containing a reference to either the Olympic Games or the ancient city of Olympia, Greece.	Libya	Olympic Azzaweya
Olympic Games	Club names containing a reference to either the Olympic Games or the ancient city of Olympia, Greece.	Mauritius	Olympique de Moka
Olympic Games	Club names containing a reference to either the Olympic Games or the ancient city of Olympia, Greece.	Morocco	Olympique de Casablanca (defunct)
Olympic Games	Club names containing a reference to either the Olympic Games or the ancient city of Olympia, Greece.	Netherlands	Volharding Olympia Combinatie
Olympic Games	Club names containing a reference to either the Olympic Games or the ancient city of Olympia, Greece.	New Caledonia	Olympique Nouméa
Olympic Games	Club names containing a reference to either the Olympic Games or the ancient city of Olympia, Greece.	New Zealand	Bay Olympic, Wellington Olympic
Olympic Games	Club names containing a reference to either the Olympic Games or the ancient city of Olympia, Greece.	Northern Ireland	Ballynahinch Olympic
Olympic Games	Club names containing a reference to either the Olympic Games or the ancient city of Olympia, Greece.	Paraguay	Olimpia
Olympic Games	Club names containing a reference to either the Olympic Games or the ancient city of Olympia, Greece.	Poland	Olimpia Elbląg, Olimpia Grudziądz, Olimpia Poznań (defunct)
Olympic Games	Club names containing a reference to either the Olympic Games or the ancient city of Olympia, Greece.	Portugal	Olímpico do Montijo
Olympic Games	Club names containing a reference to either the Olympic Games or the ancient city of Olympia, Greece.	Romania	Olimpia Satu Mare
Olympic Games	Club names containing a reference to either the Olympic Games or the ancient city of Olympia, Greece.	Scotland	Olympic F.C. (defunct)
Olympic Games	Club names containing a reference to either the Olympic Games or the ancient city of Olympia, Greece.	Sierra Leone	Regent Olympic
Olympic Games	Club names containing a reference to either the Olympic Games or the ancient city of Olympia, Greece.	Slovenia	Olimpija Ljubljana
Olympic Games	Club names containing a reference to either the Olympic Games or the ancient city of Olympia, Greece.	Sweden	BK Olympic
Olympic Games	Club names containing a reference to either the Olympic Games or the ancient city of Olympia, Greece.	Ukraine	Olimpik Donetsk, Olimpik Kropyvnytskyi, Olimpiya Savyntsi, Olimpik Kharkiv (defunct), Olimpiya FC AES Yuzhnoukrainsk (until 2005), WFC Olimp Kyiv (until 1993)
Olympic Games	Club names containing a reference to either the Olympic Games or the ancient city of Olympia, Greece.	United States	Olimpia (defunct)
Olympic Games	Club names containing a reference to either the Olympic Games or the ancient city of Olympia, Greece.	Wales	Wrexham Olympic
Racing	The English Racing Club is so named due to the club playing in the locale of Warwick Racecourse.	Argentina	Racing Avellaneda
Racing	The English Racing Club is so named due to the club playing in the locale of Warwick Racecourse.	Aruba	Racing Club Aruba
Racing	The English Racing Club is so named due to the club playing in the locale of Warwick Racecourse.	Belgium	Koninklijke Racing Club Genk
Racing	The English Racing Club is so named due to the club playing in the locale of Warwick Racecourse.	Burkina Faso	Racing Club de Bobo Dioulasso
Racing	The English Racing Club is so named due to the club playing in the locale of Warwick Racecourse.	Cameroon	Racing Club de Bafoussam
Racing	The English Racing Club is so named due to the club playing in the locale of Warwick Racecourse.	(Democratic Republic of the Congo) Democratic Republic of Congo	Racing Club Kinshasa
Racing	The English Racing Club is so named due to the club playing in the locale of Warwick Racecourse.	El Salvador	Racing de Gualuca
Racing	The English Racing Club is so named due to the club playing in the locale of Warwick Racecourse.	England	Racing Club Warwick
Racing	The English Racing Club is so named due to the club playing in the locale of Warwick Racecourse.	Equatorial Guinea	Racing de Micomeseng
Racing	The English Racing Club is so named due to the club playing in the locale of Warwick Racecourse.	France	Racing Club de France, Racing Club de Strasbourg, Racing Club de Lens
Racing	The English Racing Club is so named due to the club playing in the locale of Warwick Racecourse.	Haiti	Racing Club Haïtien
Racing	The English Racing Club is so named due to the club playing in the locale of Warwick Racecourse.	Lebanon	Racing Club Beirut
Racing	The English Racing Club is so named due to the club playing in the locale of Warwick Racecourse.	Morocco	Racing de Casablanca
Racing	The English Racing Club is so named due to the club playing in the locale of Warwick Racecourse.	Netherlands	Racing Club Heemstede
Racing	The English Racing Club is so named due to the club playing in the locale of Warwick Racecourse.	Peru	Racing de Huamachuco, Racing de Huancavelica
Racing	The English Racing Club is so named due to the club playing in the locale of Warwick Racecourse.	Spain	Racing Santander, Racing de Ferrol
Racing	The English Racing Club is so named due to the club playing in the locale of Warwick Racecourse.	United States	Racing Louisville
Racing	The English Racing Club is so named due to the club playing in the locale of Warwick Racecourse.	Uruguay	Racing Montevideo
Rambling	Hillwalking	Canada	Montreal Ramblers (defunct)
Rambling	Hillwalking	England	Burnham Ramblers, Liverpool Ramblers, Stoke Ramblers (former), City Ramblers (defunct)
Rambling	Hillwalking	Namibia	Ramblers F.C.
Rambling	Hillwalking	Republic of Ireland	Cobh Ramblers
Rambling	Hillwalking	Scotland	Renfrew Ramblers (defunct)
Rambling	Hillwalking	United States	New Hampshire Ramblers (defunct)
Rapid	Rapid means fast (Latin)	Austria	Rapid Wien
Rapid	Rapid means fast (Latin)	Canada	Ottawa Rapid
Rapid	Rapid means fast (Latin)	Norway	SK Rapid (defunct)
Rapid	Rapid means fast (Latin)	Romania	FC Rapid București
Recreation		Brazil	Cascavel Clube Recreativo
Recreation		Brunei	Brunei Shell Recreation Club
Recreation		England	Trinity Recreationists
Recreation		Guernsey	Vale Recreation
Recreation		India	Indian Bank Recreational Club
Recreation		Northern Ireland	Ballywalter Recreation, Comber Recreation, Dunmurry Recreation, Kilmore Recreation
Recreation		Singapore	Singapore Recreation Club
Recreation		Spain	Recreativo de Huelva
Recreation		Wales	Overton Recreation
Rowing	These clubs usually have a historical affiliation with rowing.	Brazil	Clube de Regatas do Flamengo, Club de Regatas Vasco da Gama, Clube de Regatas Brasil, Botafogo de Futebol e Regatas, Colo-Colo de Futebol e Regatas, Palmas Futebol e Regatas, Clube do Remo, São Cristóvão de Futebol e Regatas
Rugby football		Argentina	Buenos Aires Cricket & Rugby Club
Running		Belgium	Athletic and Running Club de Bruxelles (defunct)
Sport	Club names containing the word "sport". Examples: deportivo and polideportivo (Spanish), desportivo and esportivo (Portuguese), sport (Dutch), spor (Turkish).	Aruba	Sport Vereniging Deportivo Nacional
Sport	Club names containing the word "sport". Examples: deportivo and polideportivo (Spanish), desportivo and esportivo (Portuguese), sport (Dutch), spor (Turkish).	Belgium	Sporting Club de Bruxelles (defunct)
Sport	Club names containing the word "sport". Examples: deportivo and polideportivo (Spanish), desportivo and esportivo (Portuguese), sport (Dutch), spor (Turkish).	Brazil	Desportiva Capixaba, Clube Esportivo de Bento Gonçalves, Sport Club do Recife
Sport	Club names containing the word "sport". Examples: deportivo and polideportivo (Spanish), desportivo and esportivo (Portuguese), sport (Dutch), spor (Turkish).	Burkina Faso	Bobo Sport
Sport	Club names containing the word "sport". Examples: deportivo and polideportivo (Spanish), desportivo and esportivo (Portuguese), sport (Dutch), spor (Turkish).	Cameroon	Colombe Sportive, Coton Sport, Eding Sport, Fédéral Sporting, Foudre Sportive, Unisport
Sport	Club names containing the word "sport". Examples: deportivo and polideportivo (Spanish), desportivo and esportivo (Portuguese), sport (Dutch), spor (Turkish).	Cape Verde	Desportivo Ribeira Brava, Desportivo de Santa Cruz, Sporting Clube da Praia
Sport	Club names containing the word "sport". Examples: deportivo and polideportivo (Spanish), desportivo and esportivo (Portuguese), sport (Dutch), spor (Turkish).	Chile	Club Deportivo Huachipato, Club Deportivo O'Higgins, Deportivo Temuco
Sport	Club names containing the word "sport". Examples: deportivo and polideportivo (Spanish), desportivo and esportivo (Portuguese), sport (Dutch), spor (Turkish).	Colombia	Deportivo Cali, Deportivo Pereira, Deportes Quindío, Deportes Tolima, Deportivo Pasto, Depor FC
Sport	Club names containing the word "sport". Examples: deportivo and polideportivo (Spanish), desportivo and esportivo (Portuguese), sport (Dutch), spor (Turkish).	Egypt	Alexandria Sporting Club
Sport	Club names containing the word "sport". Examples: deportivo and polideportivo (Spanish), desportivo and esportivo (Portuguese), sport (Dutch), spor (Turkish).	England	Cowes Sports, Hullbridge Sports, Mickleover Sports, Sporting Club Albion, Sporting Club Thamesmead, Stockport Sports (defunct)
Sport	Club names containing the word "sport". Examples: deportivo and polideportivo (Spanish), desportivo and esportivo (Portuguese), sport (Dutch), spor (Turkish).	Finland	Sporting Kristina
Sport	Club names containing the word "sport". Examples: deportivo and polideportivo (Spanish), desportivo and esportivo (Portuguese), sport (Dutch), spor (Turkish).	France	Angers Sporting Club de l'Ouest, Union Sportive du Littoral de Dunkerque
Sport	Club names containing the word "sport". Examples: deportivo and polideportivo (Spanish), desportivo and esportivo (Portuguese), sport (Dutch), spor (Turkish).	Ghana	Sporting Saint Mirren
Sport	Club names containing the word "sport". Examples: deportivo and polideportivo (Spanish), desportivo and esportivo (Portuguese), sport (Dutch), spor (Turkish).	India	Sports Odisha
Sport	Club names containing the word "sport". Examples: deportivo and polideportivo (Spanish), desportivo and esportivo (Portuguese), sport (Dutch), spor (Turkish).	Ivory Coast	Africa Sports
Sport	Club names containing the word "sport". Examples: deportivo and polideportivo (Spanish), desportivo and esportivo (Portuguese), sport (Dutch), spor (Turkish).	Jamaica	Sporting Central Academy
Sport	Club names containing the word "sport". Examples: deportivo and polideportivo (Spanish), desportivo and esportivo (Portuguese), sport (Dutch), spor (Turkish).	Lebanon	BFA Sporting
Sport	Club names containing the word "sport". Examples: deportivo and polideportivo (Spanish), desportivo and esportivo (Portuguese), sport (Dutch), spor (Turkish).	Nepal	Sporting Ilam De Mechi
Sport	Club names containing the word "sport". Examples: deportivo and polideportivo (Spanish), desportivo and esportivo (Portuguese), sport (Dutch), spor (Turkish).	Netherlands	Helmond Sport, Sportclub Heerenveen
Sport	Club names containing the word "sport". Examples: deportivo and polideportivo (Spanish), desportivo and esportivo (Portuguese), sport (Dutch), spor (Turkish).	New Caledonia	AS Tiga Sport, Hienghène Sport, Thio Sport
Sport	Club names containing the word "sport". Examples: deportivo and polideportivo (Spanish), desportivo and esportivo (Portuguese), sport (Dutch), spor (Turkish).	Nigeria	Sporting Lagos
Sport	Club names containing the word "sport". Examples: deportivo and polideportivo (Spanish), desportivo and esportivo (Portuguese), sport (Dutch), spor (Turkish).	North Korea	Pyongyang Sports Club
Sport	Club names containing the word "sport". Examples: deportivo and polideportivo (Spanish), desportivo and esportivo (Portuguese), sport (Dutch), spor (Turkish).	Paraguay	Sportivo Luqueño
Sport	Club names containing the word "sport". Examples: deportivo and polideportivo (Spanish), desportivo and esportivo (Portuguese), sport (Dutch), spor (Turkish).	Peru	Deportivo Wanka, Sport Boys
Sport	Club names containing the word "sport". Examples: deportivo and polideportivo (Spanish), desportivo and esportivo (Portuguese), sport (Dutch), spor (Turkish).	Portugal	Desportivo das Aves, Desportivo de Chaves, Sporting Clube de Portugal, Sporting Clube de Braga
Sport	Club names containing the word "sport". Examples: deportivo and polideportivo (Spanish), desportivo and esportivo (Portuguese), sport (Dutch), spor (Turkish).	Republic of Ireland	Sporting Fingal (defunct)
Sport	Club names containing the word "sport". Examples: deportivo and polideportivo (Spanish), desportivo and esportivo (Portuguese), sport (Dutch), spor (Turkish).	Romania	Sportul Studențesc
Sport	Club names containing the word "sport". Examples: deportivo and polideportivo (Spanish), desportivo and esportivo (Portuguese), sport (Dutch), spor (Turkish).	Rwanda	Kiyovu Sports, Mukura Victory Sports
Sport	Club names containing the word "sport". Examples: deportivo and polideportivo (Spanish), desportivo and esportivo (Portuguese), sport (Dutch), spor (Turkish).	São Tomé and Príncipe	Sporting Clube do Príncipe, Sporting Clube de São Tomé
Sport	Club names containing the word "sport". Examples: deportivo and polideportivo (Spanish), desportivo and esportivo (Portuguese), sport (Dutch), spor (Turkish).	Scotland	Arbroath Sporting Club (defunct)
Sport	Club names containing the word "sport". Examples: deportivo and polideportivo (Spanish), desportivo and esportivo (Portuguese), sport (Dutch), spor (Turkish).	Singapore	Sembawang Sports Club
Sport	Club names containing the word "sport". Examples: deportivo and polideportivo (Spanish), desportivo and esportivo (Portuguese), sport (Dutch), spor (Turkish).	Spain	Deportivo Alavés, Deportivo de A Coruña, Granada 74, Sporting de Gijón
Sport	Club names containing the word "sport". Examples: deportivo and polideportivo (Spanish), desportivo and esportivo (Portuguese), sport (Dutch), spor (Turkish).	Switzerland	FC Lausanne-Sport
Sport	Club names containing the word "sport". Examples: deportivo and polideportivo (Spanish), desportivo and esportivo (Portuguese), sport (Dutch), spor (Turkish).	Tanzania	African Sports, Mseto Sports
Sport	Club names containing the word "sport". Examples: deportivo and polideportivo (Spanish), desportivo and esportivo (Portuguese), sport (Dutch), spor (Turkish).	Turkey	Alanyaspor, Bursaspor, Hatayspor, Kayserispor, Trabzonspor, Samsunspor
Sport	Club names containing the word "sport". Examples: deportivo and polideportivo (Spanish), desportivo and esportivo (Portuguese), sport (Dutch), spor (Turkish).	Ukraine	Hirnyk-Sport Horishni Plavni
Sport	Club names containing the word "sport". Examples: deportivo and polideportivo (Spanish), desportivo and esportivo (Portuguese), sport (Dutch), spor (Turkish).	United States	Sporting Kansas City
Sport	Club names containing the word "sport". Examples: deportivo and polideportivo (Spanish), desportivo and esportivo (Portuguese), sport (Dutch), spor (Turkish).	Wales	Mochdre Sports, Prestatyn Sports
Stadium	Club names containing the word "stadium". Examples: stade (French), stadion (Dutch and German).	Belgium	Stade Leuven (defunct)
Stadium	Club names containing the word "stadium". Examples: stade (French), stadion (Dutch and German).	Central African Republic	Stade Centrafricaine Tocages
Stadium	Club names containing the word "stadium". Examples: stade (French), stadion (Dutch and German).	(Ivory Coast) Côte d'Ivoire	Stade d'Abidjan
Stadium	Club names containing the word "stadium". Examples: stade (French), stadion (Dutch and German).	France	Stade Rennais, Stade de Reims, Stade Brestois 29, Stade Briochin, Stade Bordelais, Stade Français Paris, Stade Lavallois, Stade Plabennécois, Stade Saint-Germain
Stadium	Club names containing the word "stadium". Examples: stade (French), stadion (Dutch and German).	Gabon	Stade d'Akébé, Stade Mandji
Stadium	Club names containing the word "stadium". Examples: stade (French), stadion (Dutch and German).	Mali	Stade Malien
Stadium	Club names containing the word "stadium". Examples: stade (French), stadion (Dutch and German).	Senegal	Stade de Mbour
Stadium	Club names containing the word "stadium". Examples: stade (French), stadion (Dutch and German).	Tunisia	Stade Gabèsien, Stade Sportif Sfaxien, Stade Tunisien
Stadium	Club names containing the word "stadium". Examples: stade (French), stadion (Dutch and German).	Ukraine	WFC Arena Kyiv
Surf		Australia	Surf Coast FC
Surf		Puerto Rico	Puerto Rico Surf
Surf		United States	California Surf (defunct), New York Hampton Surf (defunct), South Florida Surf
Tennis	Football department was added to tennis club.	Germany	Tennis Borussia Berlin
Tennis	Football department was added to tennis club.	Peru	Lawn Tennis FC, Lima Cricket and Lawn Tennis Club

=== Sports societies ===
Topic	Meaning	Country	Clubs
Avant-garde	Avanhard was a trade unions sport society mainly active in the Ukrainian SSR.	Kazakhstan	FC Avangard (defunct)
Avant-garde	Avanhard was a trade unions sport society mainly active in the Ukrainian SSR.	Russia	Avangard Kursk, Avangard Kamyshin (defunct), Avangard-Kortek (defunct), Avangard Podolsk (defunct)
Avant-garde	Avanhard was a trade unions sport society mainly active in the Ukrainian SSR.	Soviet Union	Avanhard Ternopil (defunct), Avanhard Chernivtsi (until 1965), Avanhard Dnipropetrovsk (until 1968), Avanhard Horlivka (until 1947), Avanhard Kerch (until 1978), Avanhard Kharkiv (until 1967), Avanhard Kryvyi Rih (until 1961), Avanhard Makiivka (until 1970), Avanhard Mykolaiv (until 1960), Avanhard Rivne (until 1990), Avanhard Simferopol (until 1963), Avanhard Sumy (until 1963), Avanhard Zhdanov (until 1960)
Avant-garde	Avanhard was a trade unions sport society mainly active in the Ukrainian SSR.	Ukraine	Avanhard Merefa, Avanhard Zhovti Vody, Avanhard Zhydachiv, Avanhard Kramatorsk (until 2021), Avanhard Rovenky (until 2003)
Beitar	The Betar movement, associated with Revisionist Zionism	Israel	Beitar Jerusalem F.C., Beitar Tel Aviv F.C.
CSKA	CSKA means Central Army Sports Club in most Slavic languages. CWKS is the Polish equivalent, and CSCA is the Romanian/Moldovan equivalent. Indicates that the team was/is originally part of the army. (Just SKA or ASK if the army club was/is based not in the capital.)	Armenia	FC BKMA Yerevan
CSKA	CSKA means Central Army Sports Club in most Slavic languages. CWKS is the Polish equivalent, and CSCA is the Romanian/Moldovan equivalent. Indicates that the team was/is originally part of the army. (Just SKA or ASK if the army club was/is based not in the capital.)	Bulgaria	CSKA Sofia
CSKA	CSKA means Central Army Sports Club in most Slavic languages. CWKS is the Polish equivalent, and CSCA is the Romanian/Moldovan equivalent. Indicates that the team was/is originally part of the army. (Just SKA or ASK if the army club was/is based not in the capital.)	Cambodia	Royal Cambodian Armed Forces FA
CSKA	CSKA means Central Army Sports Club in most Slavic languages. CWKS is the Polish equivalent, and CSCA is the Romanian/Moldovan equivalent. Indicates that the team was/is originally part of the army. (Just SKA or ASK if the army club was/is based not in the capital.)	Laos	Lao Army F.C.
CSKA	CSKA means Central Army Sports Club in most Slavic languages. CWKS is the Polish equivalent, and CSCA is the Romanian/Moldovan equivalent. Indicates that the team was/is originally part of the army. (Just SKA or ASK if the army club was/is based not in the capital.)	Lithuania	FK Saliutas Vilnius (defunct)
CSKA	CSKA means Central Army Sports Club in most Slavic languages. CWKS is the Polish equivalent, and CSCA is the Romanian/Moldovan equivalent. Indicates that the team was/is originally part of the army. (Just SKA or ASK if the army club was/is based not in the capital.)	Malaysia	Armed Forces F.C.
CSKA	CSKA means Central Army Sports Club in most Slavic languages. CWKS is the Polish equivalent, and CSCA is the Romanian/Moldovan equivalent. Indicates that the team was/is originally part of the army. (Just SKA or ASK if the army club was/is based not in the capital.)	Poland	CWKS Legia Warszawa
CSKA	CSKA means Central Army Sports Club in most Slavic languages. CWKS is the Polish equivalent, and CSCA is the Romanian/Moldovan equivalent. Indicates that the team was/is originally part of the army. (Just SKA or ASK if the army club was/is based not in the capital.)	Romania	CSCA București
CSKA	CSKA means Central Army Sports Club in most Slavic languages. CWKS is the Polish equivalent, and CSCA is the Romanian/Moldovan equivalent. Indicates that the team was/is originally part of the army. (Just SKA or ASK if the army club was/is based not in the capital.)	Russia	PFC CSKA Moscow
CSKA	CSKA means Central Army Sports Club in most Slavic languages. CWKS is the Polish equivalent, and CSCA is the Romanian/Moldovan equivalent. Indicates that the team was/is originally part of the army. (Just SKA or ASK if the army club was/is based not in the capital.)	Soviet Union	SKA Lviv (defunct), SKA Kyiv (until 1991)
CSKA	CSKA means Central Army Sports Club in most Slavic languages. CWKS is the Polish equivalent, and CSCA is the Romanian/Moldovan equivalent. Indicates that the team was/is originally part of the army. (Just SKA or ASK if the army club was/is based not in the capital.)	Ukraine	CSKA Kyiv, SKA Odesa (until 1992)
Demirspor	Clubs in Turkey founded by the employees of the Turkish Railways (TCDD), similar to the Lokomotiv sports clubs of Eastern Europe.	Turkey	Adana Demirspor, Ankara Demirspor, Eskişehir Demirspor, İzmir Demirspor
DJK	German: Deutsche Jugendkraft Sportverband, lit. 'German Youth Power Sports Association'	Germany	DJK Abenberg, DJK Ammerthal, DJK Don Bosco Bamberg, DJK Westwacht Aachen, DJK Viktoria VfB Coburg, DJK Agon 08 Düsseldorf, DJK Gütersloh, SB/DJK Rosenheim, DJK Vilzing, DJK Waldberg
Dynamo	Majority are Eastern European teams, indicates that the team was originally part of the Soviet Dynamo sport society or an equivalent such as Sportvereinigung Dynamo.	Albania	KS Dinamo Tirana
Dynamo	Majority are Eastern European teams, indicates that the team was originally part of the Soviet Dynamo sport society or an equivalent such as Sportvereinigung Dynamo.	Belarus	Dinamo Minsk, Dinamo Brest
Dynamo	Majority are Eastern European teams, indicates that the team was originally part of the Soviet Dynamo sport society or an equivalent such as Sportvereinigung Dynamo.	Canada	Dynamo de Quebec (defunct)
Dynamo	Majority are Eastern European teams, indicates that the team was originally part of the Soviet Dynamo sport society or an equivalent such as Sportvereinigung Dynamo.	Croatia	Dinamo Zagreb
Dynamo	Majority are Eastern European teams, indicates that the team was originally part of the Soviet Dynamo sport society or an equivalent such as Sportvereinigung Dynamo.	Czech Republic	Dynamo České Budějovice
Dynamo	Majority are Eastern European teams, indicates that the team was originally part of the Soviet Dynamo sport society or an equivalent such as Sportvereinigung Dynamo.	England	Loughborough Dynamo, Shepshed Dynamo, Colne Dynamoes (defunct)
Dynamo	Majority are Eastern European teams, indicates that the team was originally part of the Soviet Dynamo sport society or an equivalent such as Sportvereinigung Dynamo.	Estonia	Dünamo Tallinn
Dynamo	Majority are Eastern European teams, indicates that the team was originally part of the Soviet Dynamo sport society or an equivalent such as Sportvereinigung Dynamo.	(Georgia (country)) Georgia	Dinamo Batumi, Dinamo Tbilisi, Dinamo Sokhumi
Dynamo	Majority are Eastern European teams, indicates that the team was originally part of the Soviet Dynamo sport society or an equivalent such as Sportvereinigung Dynamo.	Germany	Berliner FC Dynamo, Dynamo Dresden
Dynamo	Majority are Eastern European teams, indicates that the team was originally part of the Soviet Dynamo sport society or an equivalent such as Sportvereinigung Dynamo.	India	Delhi Dynamos
Dynamo	Majority are Eastern European teams, indicates that the team was originally part of the Soviet Dynamo sport society or an equivalent such as Sportvereinigung Dynamo.	Latvia	FK Dinamo-Rīnuži/LASD
Dynamo	Majority are Eastern European teams, indicates that the team was originally part of the Soviet Dynamo sport society or an equivalent such as Sportvereinigung Dynamo.	Moldova	FC Dinamo Bender
Dynamo	Majority are Eastern European teams, indicates that the team was originally part of the Soviet Dynamo sport society or an equivalent such as Sportvereinigung Dynamo.	Republic of Ireland	Dynamo Blues
Dynamo	Majority are Eastern European teams, indicates that the team was originally part of the Soviet Dynamo sport society or an equivalent such as Sportvereinigung Dynamo.	Romania	Dinamo Bucharest
Dynamo	Majority are Eastern European teams, indicates that the team was originally part of the Soviet Dynamo sport society or an equivalent such as Sportvereinigung Dynamo.	Russia	Dynamo Moscow, Dynamo Bryansk, Dynamo Barnaul, Dynamo Kirov, Dinamo Spb, Dinamo Biysk, Dinamo Kostroma, Dinamo Stavropol, Dinamo Makhackhala (defunct)
Dynamo	Majority are Eastern European teams, indicates that the team was originally part of the Soviet Dynamo sport society or an equivalent such as Sportvereinigung Dynamo.	Soviet Union	Dynamo Dnipropetrovsk (defunct), Dynamo Kirovohrad (until 1962)
Dynamo	Majority are Eastern European teams, indicates that the team was originally part of the Soviet Dynamo sport society or an equivalent such as Sportvereinigung Dynamo.	Ukraine	Dynamo Kyiv, Dynamo Kharkiv, Dynamo Lviv, Dynamo Odesa, Dynamo Luhansk (defunct), Dynamo Saky (defunct), Dynamo Sloviansk (defunct), Dynamo Bila Tserkva (until 1992), Dynamo Khmelnytskyi (until 2013), Dynamo Simferopol (until 2004)
Dynamo	Majority are Eastern European teams, indicates that the team was originally part of the Soviet Dynamo sport society or an equivalent such as Sportvereinigung Dynamo.	United States	Houston Dynamo
Dynamo	Majority are Eastern European teams, indicates that the team was originally part of the Soviet Dynamo sport society or an equivalent such as Sportvereinigung Dynamo.	Uzbekistan	Dinamo Samarqand
Dynamo	Majority are Eastern European teams, indicates that the team was originally part of the Soviet Dynamo sport society or an equivalent such as Sportvereinigung Dynamo.	Zimbabwe	Dynamos Harare
Hapoel	Hebrew for The Worker, an Israeli sport association, with links to trade unionism	Israel	Hapoel Acre, Hapoel Ashkelon, Hapoel Asi Gilboa, Hapoel Balfouria, Hapoel Be'er Sheva, Hapoel Haifa, Hapoel Ironi Rishon LeZion, Hapoel Jerusalem, Hapoel Petah Tikva, Hapoel Ra'anana, Hapoel Ramat Gan, Hapoel Tel Aviv
Hart	Hart is the Ukrainian student's sport society	Ukraine	Hart Borodianka (until 1994)
Homenetmen & Homenmen	pan-Armenian sports and Scouting organization	Lebanon	Homenetmen Beirut F.C., Homenmen Beirut
Homenetmen & Homenmen	pan-Armenian sports and Scouting organization	Syria	Homenetmen Aleppo Club
IF	IF, Idrætsforening, Danish for Sporting Society	Norway Denmark	Brøndby IF, Strømsgodset IF, Mjøndalen IF
IFK	IFK, Idrottsföreningen Kamraterna, Swedish for Sporting Society Comrades. All Swedish clubs named IFK are members of IFK's central organisation, while clubs named IFK in Finland are not.	Finland	Helsingfors IFK, IFK Mariehamn, Vasa IFK, Åbo IFK, Grankulla IFK
IFK	IFK, Idrottsföreningen Kamraterna, Swedish for Sporting Society Comrades. All Swedish clubs named IFK are members of IFK's central organisation, while clubs named IFK in Finland are not.	Sweden	IFK Eskilstuna, IFK Göteborg, IFK Malmö, IFK Norrköping, IFK Lidingö, IFK Stockholm, IFK Uddevalla, IFK Umeå, IFK Åmål, IFK Mora, IFK Luleå
LFLS	LFLS, Lietuvos Fizinio Lavinimosi Sąjunga, teams associated with or created by chapters of the Lithuanian Physical Education Union.	Lithuania	LFLS Kaunas, ŠŠ Kovas Kaunas (until 1923),
LGSF	LGSF, Lietuvos Gimnastikos ir Sporto Federacija, teams created as chapters of the Lithuanian Gymnastics sport society	Lithuania	LGSF Kaunas
Lokomotiv	For Eastern European teams, indicates that the team was originally part of the Soviet Lokomotiv sport society or an equivalent. Kigwancha means "locomotive" in Korean.	Armenia	FC Lokomotiv Yerevan (defunct)
Lokomotiv	For Eastern European teams, indicates that the team was originally part of the Soviet Lokomotiv sport society or an equivalent. Kigwancha means "locomotive" in Korean.	Australia	Lokomotiv Cove
Lokomotiv	For Eastern European teams, indicates that the team was originally part of the Soviet Lokomotiv sport society or an equivalent. Kigwancha means "locomotive" in Korean.	Azerbaijan	Lokomotiv-Bilajary FK (defunct)
Lokomotiv	For Eastern European teams, indicates that the team was originally part of the Soviet Lokomotiv sport society or an equivalent. Kigwancha means "locomotive" in Korean.	Belarus	Lokomotiv Gomel (former)
Lokomotiv	For Eastern European teams, indicates that the team was originally part of the Soviet Lokomotiv sport society or an equivalent. Kigwancha means "locomotive" in Korean.	Bulgaria	Lokomotiv Gorna Oryahovitsa, Lokomotiv Plovdiv, Lokomotiv Sofia
Lokomotiv	For Eastern European teams, indicates that the team was originally part of the Soviet Lokomotiv sport society or an equivalent. Kigwancha means "locomotive" in Korean.	China	Lokomotiv Tianjin
Lokomotiv	For Eastern European teams, indicates that the team was originally part of the Soviet Lokomotiv sport society or an equivalent. Kigwancha means "locomotive" in Korean.	Croatia	Lokomotiva Zagreb
Lokomotiv	For Eastern European teams, indicates that the team was originally part of the Soviet Lokomotiv sport society or an equivalent. Kigwancha means "locomotive" in Korean.	Czech Republic	FK Loko Prague
Lokomotiv	For Eastern European teams, indicates that the team was originally part of the Soviet Lokomotiv sport society or an equivalent. Kigwancha means "locomotive" in Korean.	Estonia	Jõhvi FC Lokomotiv (former)
Lokomotiv	For Eastern European teams, indicates that the team was originally part of the Soviet Lokomotiv sport society or an equivalent. Kigwancha means "locomotive" in Korean.	Germany	1. FC Lokomotive Leipzig
Lokomotiv	For Eastern European teams, indicates that the team was originally part of the Soviet Lokomotiv sport society or an equivalent. Kigwancha means "locomotive" in Korean.	(Georgia (country)) Georgia	Locomotive Tbilisi
Lokomotiv	For Eastern European teams, indicates that the team was originally part of the Soviet Lokomotiv sport society or an equivalent. Kigwancha means "locomotive" in Korean.	Kazakhstan	Lokomotiv Astana
Lokomotiv	For Eastern European teams, indicates that the team was originally part of the Soviet Lokomotiv sport society or an equivalent. Kigwancha means "locomotive" in Korean.	Moldova	Locomotiva Bălți
Lokomotiv	For Eastern European teams, indicates that the team was originally part of the Soviet Lokomotiv sport society or an equivalent. Kigwancha means "locomotive" in Korean.	North Korea	Kigwancha Sports Club
Lokomotiv	For Eastern European teams, indicates that the team was originally part of the Soviet Lokomotiv sport society or an equivalent. Kigwancha means "locomotive" in Korean.	North Macedonia	FK Lokomotiva Skopje
Lokomotiv	For Eastern European teams, indicates that the team was originally part of the Soviet Lokomotiv sport society or an equivalent. Kigwancha means "locomotive" in Korean.	Norway	Lokomotiv Oslo
Lokomotiv	For Eastern European teams, indicates that the team was originally part of the Soviet Lokomotiv sport society or an equivalent. Kigwancha means "locomotive" in Korean.	Russia	Lokomotiv Moscow, Lokomotiv Liski, Lokomotiv NN, Lokomotiv Chita (formerly)
Lokomotiv	For Eastern European teams, indicates that the team was originally part of the Soviet Lokomotiv sport society or an equivalent. Kigwancha means "locomotive" in Korean.	Scotland	Caledonian Locomotives (defunct)
Lokomotiv	For Eastern European teams, indicates that the team was originally part of the Soviet Lokomotiv sport society or an equivalent. Kigwancha means "locomotive" in Korean.	Slovakia	Lokomotíva Košice
Lokomotiv	For Eastern European teams, indicates that the team was originally part of the Soviet Lokomotiv sport society or an equivalent. Kigwancha means "locomotive" in Korean.	Soviet Union	Lokomotyv Donetsk (defunct), Lokomotyv Kharkiv (defunct), Lokomotyv Kherson (until 1975), Lokomotyv Vinnytsia (until 1979)
Lokomotiv	For Eastern European teams, indicates that the team was originally part of the Soviet Lokomotiv sport society or an equivalent. Kigwancha means "locomotive" in Korean.	Tajikistan	FC Lokomotiv-Pamir
Lokomotiv	For Eastern European teams, indicates that the team was originally part of the Soviet Lokomotiv sport society or an equivalent. Kigwancha means "locomotive" in Korean.	Ukraine	Lokomotyv Kyiv, Lokomotyv Dvorichna (defunct), Lokomotyv Smila (defunct)
Lokomotiv	For Eastern European teams, indicates that the team was originally part of the Soviet Lokomotiv sport society or an equivalent. Kigwancha means "locomotive" in Korean.	United States	El Paso Locomotive
Lokomotiv	For Eastern European teams, indicates that the team was originally part of the Soviet Lokomotiv sport society or an equivalent. Kigwancha means "locomotive" in Korean.	Uzbekistan	Lokomotiv Tashkent
Maccabi	For Jewish teams, indicates that the team was originally part of the Maccabi sport society.	Israel and others	(see list)
Spal	The Spal sports clubs, associated with Salesian Society	Italy	S.P.A.L.
Spartak	For Eastern European teams, indicates that the team was originally part of the Soviet Spartak sport society or an equivalent.	Armenia	Spartak Yerevan (defunct)
Spartak	For Eastern European teams, indicates that the team was originally part of the Soviet Spartak sport society or an equivalent.	Azerbaijan	Spartak Guba (defunct)
Spartak	For Eastern European teams, indicates that the team was originally part of the Soviet Spartak sport society or an equivalent.	Bulgaria	Spartak Pleven, Spartak Plovdiv, Spartak Sofia (defunct), Spartak Varna
Spartak	For Eastern European teams, indicates that the team was originally part of the Soviet Spartak sport society or an equivalent.	Cape Verde	Spartak d'Aguadinha
Spartak	For Eastern European teams, indicates that the team was originally part of the Soviet Spartak sport society or an equivalent.	England	Barnt Green Spartak (former)
Spartak	For Eastern European teams, indicates that the team was originally part of the Soviet Spartak sport society or an equivalent.	(Georgia (country)) Georgia	Spartaki Tskhinvali
Spartak	For Eastern European teams, indicates that the team was originally part of the Soviet Spartak sport society or an equivalent.	Kazakhstan	Spartak Semey
Spartak	For Eastern European teams, indicates that the team was originally part of the Soviet Spartak sport society or an equivalent.	Latvia	Spartaks Jūrmala
Spartak	For Eastern European teams, indicates that the team was originally part of the Soviet Spartak sport society or an equivalent.	Russia	Spartak Moscow, Spartak Nalchik, Spartak-Alania Vladikavkaz, Spartak Kostroma, Spartak Tambov, Spartak Yoshkar-Ola, Spartak Gorno-Altaysk (defunct)
Spartak	For Eastern European teams, indicates that the team was originally part of the Soviet Spartak sport society or an equivalent.	Serbia	Spartak Subotica, FK Spartak Ljig, Spartak Zlatibor Voda
Spartak	For Eastern European teams, indicates that the team was originally part of the Soviet Spartak sport society or an equivalent.	Slovakia	Spartak Trnava
Spartak	For Eastern European teams, indicates that the team was originally part of the Soviet Spartak sport society or an equivalent.	Soviet Union	Spartak Dnipropetrovsk (defunct), Spartak Kharkiv (defunct), Spartak Lviv (defunct), Spartak Odesa (until 1941), Spartak Sambir (until 1991), Spartak Sumy (until 1971), Spartak Uzzhorod (until 1960)
Spartak	For Eastern European teams, indicates that the team was originally part of the Soviet Spartak sport society or an equivalent.	Ukraine	Spartak Ivano-Frankivsk (defunct)
Torpedo	For Eastern European teams, indicates that the team was once part of the Soviet republican VSS Trud (automobile and truck manufacture industries).	Belarus	Torpedo Minsk, Torpedo-BelAZ Zhodino
Torpedo	For Eastern European teams, indicates that the team was once part of the Soviet republican VSS Trud (automobile and truck manufacture industries).	(Georgia (country)) Georgia	Torpedo Kutaisi
Torpedo	For Eastern European teams, indicates that the team was once part of the Soviet republican VSS Trud (automobile and truck manufacture industries).	Russia	Torpedo Moscow, Torpedo Vladimir, Torpedo Armavir, Torpedo Miass Torpedo-ZIL Moscow
Torpedo	For Eastern European teams, indicates that the team was once part of the Soviet republican VSS Trud (automobile and truck manufacture industries).	Soviet Union	Torpedo Kharkiv (defunct), Torpedo Kirovohrad (until 1957), Torpedo Lutsk (until 1989)
Torpedo	For Eastern European teams, indicates that the team was once part of the Soviet republican VSS Trud (automobile and truck manufacture industries).	Ukraine	Torpedo Zaporizhzhia (defunct), Torpedo Melitopol (until 2000)
Trudovye Rezervy	For Eastern European teams, indicates that the team was once part of the Soviet republican VSS Trudovye Rezervy (vocational schools).	Belarus	Trudovye Rezervy-RIPO Minsk
Trudovye Rezervy	For Eastern European teams, indicates that the team was once part of the Soviet republican VSS Trudovye Rezervy (vocational schools).	Soviet Union	Emgek Rezervi Frunze (until 1953), Trudovi Rezervy Voroshylovhrad (until 1964), Trudovye Rezervy Kislovodsk (until 1965), Trudovye Rezervy Kursk (until 1972), Trudovye Rezervy Lipetsk (until 1960)
Vorwärts	Armeesportvereinigung Vorwärts were the sports society of the East German Army.	Germany	Vorwärts Berlin (formerly), Vorwärts Frankfurt (formerly), Vorwärts Leipzig (defunct), Vorwärts Strausberg (formerly), Vorwärts Stralsund (formerly, defunct)
YMCA	KFUM is the Scandinavian translation	Australia	YMCA F.C.
YMCA	KFUM is the Scandinavian translation	Denmark	Fuglebakken KFUM Århus, KFUM Roskilde, KFUMs Boldklub København
YMCA	KFUM is the Scandinavian translation	England	Gloucester YMCA, Horsham YMCA, Kingston & Surbiton YMCA
YMCA	KFUM is the Scandinavian translation	Ireland	YMCA F.C. (defunct)
YMCA	KFUM is the Scandinavian translation	Norway	KFUM-Kameratene Oslo
YMCA	KFUM is the Scandinavian translation	Republic of Ireland	Mount Merrion YMCA
YMCA	KFUM is the Scandinavian translation	Scotland	Dumfries YMCA
YMCA	KFUM is the Scandinavian translation	Timor-Leste	YMCA FC
YMCA	KFUM is the Scandinavian translation	Wales	Aber Valley YMCA, Newport YMCA
Zenit	For Eastern European teams, indicates that the team was originally part of the Soviet Zenit sport society or an equivalent.	Czech Republic	Zenit Čáslav
Zenit	For Eastern European teams, indicates that the team was originally part of the Soviet Zenit sport society or an equivalent.	Russia	Zenit Saint Petersburg, Zenit Penza
Zenit	For Eastern European teams, indicates that the team was originally part of the Soviet Zenit sport society or an equivalent.	Soviet Union	Zenit Kharkiv (until 1940)

== Values and ideals ==
Topic	Meaning	Country	Clubs
Bravery		Canada	Ottawa Intrepid (defunct)
Bravery		Suriname	V.V. Fearless (defunct)
Bravery		United States	Brave SC, North Carolina Courage
Friendship		England	Friends of Fulham
Friendship		Hong Kong	Sai Kung Friends
Friendship		Laos	Friends Development
Friendship		Nepal	Friends Club
Friendship		Russia	Druzhba Maykop, Druzhba Arzamas (defunct), Druzhba Budyonnovsk (until 1994), Druzhba Yoshkar-Ola (until 1998)
Friendship		Ukraine	Druzhba Myrivka, Druzhba Berdiansk (defunct)
Friendship		United States	Tucson Amigos (defunct)
Freedom	"Libertas" meaning "freedom" in Latin, Libertad means freedom in Spanish	Argentina	Libertad de Sunchales
Freedom	"Libertas" meaning "freedom" in Latin, Libertad means freedom in Spanish	Ghana	Liberty Professionals FC
Freedom	"Libertas" meaning "freedom" in Latin, Libertad means freedom in Spanish	Italy	Lucchese Libertas
Freedom	"Libertas" meaning "freedom" in Latin, Libertad means freedom in Spanish	Romania	CF Liberty Oradea
Freedom	"Libertas" meaning "freedom" in Latin, Libertad means freedom in Spanish	San Marino	A.C. Libertas
Freedom	"Libertas" meaning "freedom" in Latin, Libertad means freedom in Spanish	United States	New York Pancyprian-Freedoms, Miami Freedom (defunct), Philadelphia Freedom (defunct), Washington Freedom (defunct)
Glory		Australia	Perth Glory
Glory		United States	Green Bay Glory
Health	Lithuanian:"Sveikata" Basque:"Osasuna"	Lithuania	FK Sveikata Kybartai
Health	Lithuanian:"Sveikata" Basque:"Osasuna"	Spain	CA Osasuna
Hope		Benin	Espoir FC
Hope		Cameroon	Espérance FC
Hope		France	Espérance Sportive Troyes Aube Champagne
Hope		Guinea	Espoir de Labé
Hope		Moldova	FC Speranţa Cahul
Hope		Niger	Espoir FC
Hope		Rwanda	Espoir FC
Hope		Tunisia	Espérance Sportive de Tunis, Espérance Sportive de Zarzis, Espoir Sportif de Hammam-Sousse
Independence	Persian: Esteghlal	Argentina	Club Atlético Independiente
Independence	Persian: Esteghlal	Brazil	Independência Futebol Clube, Independente Esportes Clube Macaé
Independence	Persian: Esteghlal	Colombia	Independiente Medellín
Independence	Persian: Esteghlal	Iran	Esteghlal Tehran F.C.
Independence	Persian: Esteghlal	United States	Charlotte Independence, Philadelphia Independence (defunct)
Loyalty		United States	San Diego Loyal
Multiculturalism	"Cosmos" is short for "Cosmopolitan"	Australia	Canberra Cosmos (defunct)
Multiculturalism	"Cosmos" is short for "Cosmopolitan"	Gibraltar	College Cosmos
Multiculturalism	"Cosmos" is short for "Cosmopolitan"	San Marino	S.S. Cosmos
Multiculturalism	"Cosmos" is short for "Cosmopolitan"	Singapore	Commonwealth Cosmos
Multiculturalism	"Cosmos" is short for "Cosmopolitan"	South Africa	Jomo Cosmos, OR Tambo Cosmos
Multiculturalism	"Cosmos" is short for "Cosmopolitan"	Tanzania	Cosmopolitans F.C.
Multiculturalism	"Cosmos" is short for "Cosmopolitan"	United States	New York Cosmos
Passion		United States	Connecticut Passion (defunct)
Peace		Ukraine	Myr Hornostayivka
Perseverance		England	Methley Perseverance (defunct)
Pride		Barbados	Pride of Gall Hill
Pride		India	Pride Sports FC
Pride		New Zealand	Canterbury United Pride
Pride		United States	Maryland Pride (defunct), Orlando Pride, Portland Pride (defunct)
Rebellion		British Virgin Islands	Rebels FC
Rebellion		Canada	Revolution FC
Rebellion		Saint Lucia	Uptown Rebels
Rebellion		United States	New England Revolution, Tacoma Defiance, Georgia Revolution, Wisconsin Rebels (defunct)
Renaissance	Albanian: Rilindja	Cameroon	Renaissance FC de Ngoumou
Renaissance	Albanian: Rilindja	Chad	Renaissance FC
Renaissance	Albanian: Rilindja	(Democratic Republic of the Congo) Democratic Republic of Congo	FC Renaissance du Congo
Renaissance	Albanian: Rilindja	Kosovo	KF Rilindja e Kosovës
Renaissance	Albanian: Rilindja	Morocco	Renaissance Sportive de Berkane
Renaissance	Albanian: Rilindja	Norway	Rilindja IL
Spirit		Australia	North West Sydney Spirit, Western Spirit
Spirit		Canada	Kitchener Spirit (defunct)
Spirit		New Zealand	Coastal Spirit
Spirit		United States	Tulsa Spirit, Washington Spirit, Baltimore Spirit (defunct), Penn-Jersey Spirit (defunct), San Diego Spirit (defunct)
Strength		Bolivia	The Strongest
Strength		Spain	Strong FC (defunct)
Transcendence		China	Dalian Transcendence (defunct)
Unity	An example of this is Alianza (Spanish).	Canada	Unity FC
Unity	An example of this is Alianza (Spanish).	England	Aston Unity (defunct), Great Bridge Unity (defunct), Unity F.C. (defunct), Walsall Unity (defunct)
Unity	An example of this is Alianza (Spanish).	Germany	1. FC Union Berlin
Unity	An example of this is Alianza (Spanish).	Ghana	Unity F.C.
Unity	An example of this is Alianza (Spanish).	Peru	Alianza Lima, Alianza Atlético
Unity	An example of this is Alianza (Spanish).	Portugal	União Futebol Comércio e Indústria, União de Leiria, União Desportiva Oliveirense, União de Santarém, União de Tomar, União de Coimbra, União de Lamas
Unity	An example of this is Alianza (Spanish).	Romania	Unirea Urziceni, Unirea Alba-Iulia, Unirea Focșani
Unity	An example of this is Alianza (Spanish).	El Salvador	Alianza F.C.
Unity	An example of this is Alianza (Spanish).	United States	Philadelphia Union
Unity	An example of this is Alianza (Spanish).	Ukraine	Yednist Plysky
Valour		Canada	Valour FC
Victory	Arabic: Al-Nasr	Australia	Melbourne Victory
Victory	Arabic: Al-Nasr	Czech Republic	FC Viktoria Plzeň
Victory	Arabic: Al-Nasr	Egypt	Al Nasr
Victory	Arabic: Al-Nasr	England	Attercliffe Victory (defunct)
Victory	Arabic: Al-Nasr	Honduras	Victoria
Victory	Arabic: Al-Nasr	Luxembourg	FC Victoria Rosport
Victory	Arabic: Al-Nasr	Moldova	Victoria Bardar
Victory	Arabic: Al-Nasr	Portugal	Vitória de Guimarães, Vitória de Setúbal, Vitória C.L., Vitória Pico da Pedra
Victory	Arabic: Al-Nasr	Romania	FC Victoria Brăneşti, Victoria București
Victory	Arabic: Al-Nasr	Rwanda	Mukura Victory Sports
Victory	Arabic: Al-Nasr	Saudi Arabia	Al-Nasr
Victory	Arabic: Al-Nasr	United Arab Emirates	Al-Nasr Sports Club
Youth	Examples of this are "jeunesse" (French), "junior" (several languages) and "iuventūs" (Latin)	Algeria	Jeunesse Sportive de Kabylie
Youth	Examples of this are "jeunesse" (French), "junior" (several languages) and "iuventūs" (Latin)	Argentina	Boca Juniors, Argentinos Juniors, Chacarita Juniors, Juventud Alianza de San Juan
Youth	Examples of this are "jeunesse" (French), "junior" (several languages) and "iuventūs" (Latin)	Australia	Adelaide Juventus
Youth	Examples of this are "jeunesse" (French), "junior" (several languages) and "iuventūs" (Latin)	Belize	Juventus
Youth	Examples of this are "jeunesse" (French), "junior" (several languages) and "iuventūs" (Latin)	Bonaire	SV Juventus
Youth	Examples of this are "jeunesse" (French), "junior" (several languages) and "iuventūs" (Latin)	Botswana	Debswana Youngsters
Youth	Examples of this are "jeunesse" (French), "junior" (several languages) and "iuventūs" (Latin)	Brazil	EC Juventude, CA Juventus
Youth	Examples of this are "jeunesse" (French), "junior" (several languages) and "iuventūs" (Latin)	Cameroon	Jeunesse Bamiléké
Youth	Examples of this are "jeunesse" (French), "junior" (several languages) and "iuventūs" (Latin)	Cape Verde	Juventude do Norte
Youth	Examples of this are "jeunesse" (French), "junior" (several languages) and "iuventūs" (Latin)	Colombia	Junior de Barranquilla, Juventud Soacha
Youth	Examples of this are "jeunesse" (French), "junior" (several languages) and "iuventūs" (Latin)	Ecuador	Juvenil Minera (Las Naves), Juvenil (Quinindé), Juvenil de Esmeraldas, Club Social y Deportivo Juventus, Juventud Italiana (Manta)
Youth	Examples of this are "jeunesse" (French), "junior" (several languages) and "iuventūs" (Latin)	England	Spartans Youth
Youth	Examples of this are "jeunesse" (French), "junior" (several languages) and "iuventūs" (Latin)	France	Association de la Jeunesse auxerroise
Youth	Examples of this are "jeunesse" (French), "junior" (several languages) and "iuventūs" (Latin)	Germany	Deutsche Jugendkraft Don Bosco Bamberg
Youth	Examples of this are "jeunesse" (French), "junior" (several languages) and "iuventūs" (Latin)	Honduras	C.D. Real Juventud, Real Juventud San Joaquín
Youth	Examples of this are "jeunesse" (French), "junior" (several languages) and "iuventūs" (Latin)	(Ivory Coast) Côte d'Ivoire	Jeunesse Club d'Abidjan
Youth	Examples of this are "jeunesse" (French), "junior" (several languages) and "iuventūs" (Latin)	Indonesia	Arema
Youth	Examples of this are "jeunesse" (French), "junior" (several languages) and "iuventūs" (Latin)	Republic of Ireland	Wexford Youths
Youth	Examples of this are "jeunesse" (French), "junior" (several languages) and "iuventūs" (Latin)	Italy	Juventus FC, ASD Fortis Juventus 1909, SS Juve Stabia, ASG Nocerina (defunct), ASD Nocerina 1910
Youth	Examples of this are "jeunesse" (French), "junior" (several languages) and "iuventūs" (Latin)	Laos	Young Elephants FC
Youth	Examples of this are "jeunesse" (French), "junior" (several languages) and "iuventūs" (Latin)	Luxembourg	Jeunesse Esch, Jeunesse Hautcharage (defunct), Jeunesse Sportive Verlorenkost (defunct), Jeunesse Canach, Jeunesse Junglinster
Youth	Examples of this are "jeunesse" (French), "junior" (several languages) and "iuventūs" (Latin)	Malta	Oratory Youths
Youth	Examples of this are "jeunesse" (French), "junior" (several languages) and "iuventūs" (Latin)	Morocco	Jeunesse Massira
Youth	Examples of this are "jeunesse" (French), "junior" (several languages) and "iuventūs" (Latin)	Mozambique	Juventus Manica
Youth	Examples of this are "jeunesse" (French), "junior" (several languages) and "iuventūs" (Latin)	Nicaragua	Juventus F.C.
Youth	Examples of this are "jeunesse" (French), "junior" (several languages) and "iuventūs" (Latin)	Poland	Junak Drohobycz (defunct)
Youth	Examples of this are "jeunesse" (French), "junior" (several languages) and "iuventūs" (Latin)	Portugal	Juventude de Évora, Juventude da Castanheira
Youth	Examples of this are "jeunesse" (French), "junior" (several languages) and "iuventūs" (Latin)	Romania	Juventus București
Youth	Examples of this are "jeunesse" (French), "junior" (several languages) and "iuventūs" (Latin)	Russia	FC Smena Komsomolsk-na-Amure
Youth	Examples of this are "jeunesse" (French), "junior" (several languages) and "iuventūs" (Latin)	Samoa	Apia Youth
Youth	Examples of this are "jeunesse" (French), "junior" (several languages) and "iuventūs" (Latin)	Serbia	Mladost Lučani, Mladost Apatin
Youth	Examples of this are "jeunesse" (French), "junior" (several languages) and "iuventūs" (Latin)	Singapore	Young Lions FC
Youth	Examples of this are "jeunesse" (French), "junior" (several languages) and "iuventūs" (Latin)	South Africa	Bloemfontein Young Tigers
Youth	Examples of this are "jeunesse" (French), "junior" (several languages) and "iuventūs" (Latin)	South Sudan	Young Stars
Youth	Examples of this are "jeunesse" (French), "junior" (several languages) and "iuventūs" (Latin)	Switzerland	BSC Young Boys, SC Young Fellows Juventus
Youth	Examples of this are "jeunesse" (French), "junior" (several languages) and "iuventūs" (Latin)	Syria	Jeunesse Sportivo Alep
Youth	Examples of this are "jeunesse" (French), "junior" (several languages) and "iuventūs" (Latin)	Tanzania	Young Africans S.C.
Youth	Examples of this are "jeunesse" (French), "junior" (several languages) and "iuventūs" (Latin)	Tunisia	Jeunesse Sportive Kairouanaise
Youth	Examples of this are "jeunesse" (French), "junior" (several languages) and "iuventūs" (Latin)	Ukraine	WFC Yunist-ShVSM Chernihiv
Youth	Examples of this are "jeunesse" (French), "junior" (several languages) and "iuventūs" (Latin)	Uruguay	Rampla Juniors
Youth	Examples of this are "jeunesse" (French), "junior" (several languages) and "iuventūs" (Latin)	Wales	Acrefair Youth, Johnstown Youth

== Different club or city ==
These clubs were named after unrelated clubs (i.e. clubs they are not affiliated with) or unrelated cities (in which they never played). In some cases these are refugee or diaspora clubs, in other cases they were founded by fans of foreign clubs.

Topic	Meaning	Country	Clubs
Arsenal F.C.	Named after the English football club	Ghana	Berekum Arsenal F.C.
Arsenal F.C.	Named after the English football club	Ukraine	Arsenal Kharkiv, Arsenal-Kyivshchyna
Barcelona	Named after the capital of Catalonia	Ecuador	Barcelona S.C.
FC Barcelona	Named after the Spanish football club	Ukraine	Barsa Sumy
Blackpool F.C.	Named after the English football club	Sierra Leone	Mighty Blackpool F.C.
Boca Juniors	Named after the Argentine football club	Colombia	Boca Juniors de Cali
Botafogo FR	Named after the Brazilian football club	Cape Verde	Botafogo FC
Chelsea F.C.	Named after the English football club	Ghana	Berekum Chelsea F.C.
Colo-Colo	Named after the Chilean football club	Brazil	Colo Colo de Futebol e Regatas
Everton F.C.	Named after the English football club	Chile	Everton de Viña del Mar
Fenerbahçe S.K.	Named after the Turkish football club	Switzerland	FC Fenerbahce Zürich (until 2010)
Inter Milan	Named after the Italian football club	Finland	FC Inter Turku
Istanbul	Named after the Turkish city (when it was named Constantinople)	Greece	Athlitiki Enosis Konstantinoupoleos Athens F.C., Panthessaloníkios Athlitikós Ómilos Konstadinoupolitón FC
Lincoln City F.C.	Named after the English football club	Gibraltar	Lincoln Red Imps F.C.
Liverpool	Named after the city in England	Uruguay	Liverpool F.C.
Manchester United F.C.	Named after the English football club	Gibraltar	Manchester 62 F.C.
P.A.O.K.	Named after the Greek football club	Australia	East Altona PAOK Soccer Club (until 1990s)
Rangers F.C.	Named after the Scottish football club	Hong Kong	Hong Kong Rangers FC
Real Madrid CF	Named after the Spanish football club	Bolivia	Club Real Potosí
Real Madrid CF	Named after the Spanish football club	Ukraine	Real Odesa
Real Madrid CF	Named after the Spanish football club	United States	Real Salt Lake
Santos FC	Named after the Brazilian football club	Angola	Santos Futebol Clube de Angola
Santos FC	Named after the Brazilian football club	Costa Rica	Santos de Guápiles F.C.
Santos FC	Named after the Brazilian football club	Estonia	FC Santos Tartu
Santos FC	Named after the Brazilian football club	Guyana	Santos FC
St Mirren F.C.	Named after the Scottish football club	Ghana	Sporting Saint Mirren FC (until 2017)
Torino FC	Named after the Italian football club	Peru	Atlético Torino
Varna	Named after the city in Bulgaria	Ukraine	WFC Varna Donetsk (until 1997)
