= BFC Germania 1888 =

German football club

- Full name: Berliner Fußball Club Germania 1888 e.V.
- Nickname: Die Germanen (The Germanics)
- Founded: 15 April 1888; 138 years ago
- Ground: Sportplatz an der Götzstrasse
- Capacity: 1,000
- League: Kreisliga B Berlin
- 2022–23: 9th
- Website: bfcgermania88.de
Home colours	Away colours

Berliner Fußball Club Germania 1888 is a German association football club from Berlin. Founded on 15 April 1888, it is the oldest active association football club in Germany.

== History ==
BFC Germania 1888 was founded as BFC Germania by 17-year-old Paul Jestram, his three brothers (Max, Fritz, and Walter Jestram), and a number of their schoolmates from Askanischen Gymnasium, at a time when football was not yet common in Germany, the first football games having been played in Berlin and Hamburg in the winter of 1881–82 by expatriate Englishmen. No football pitches had yet been built so BFC played on the Tempelhofer Field where an airport would later be constructed.

=== Germany's first unofficial champion ===
BFC Germania 1888 was part of the country's first football league, the BDF (Bund Deutscher Fußballspieler or Federation of German Football Players) which was formed in November 1890 and was active until February 1892. The league was made up of the Berlin-based clubs BFC Vorwärts 1890, BFC Askania 1890, BFC Borussia 1890, BFC Concordia 1890, BFC Hellas 1890, BFC Tasmania 1890 and BFC Teutonia 1891. Germania emerged the winner in a tournament staged by the league, and as the DBF was the only football league in the country at the time, can lay claim to being Germany's first champion. Club records indicate that BFC then defended their title, but no supporting evidence has been found.

Disagreement over whether or not to allow foreign players to participate in the championship rounds and how to manage the transfer of players between teams led to the collapse of the BDF and the formation of the DFuCB (Deutschen Fußball- und Cricket Bund or German Football and Cricket Federation) in 1891. Many of the BDF's former clubs joined the new league, a few folded, while some played in other leagues. Germania tried to join the DFuCB but was initially refused entry because of its difficult, overly nationalist attitude and inability to cooperate with other clubs while part of the BDF. It was admitted to the new circuit a year later in 1892. Over the next half dozen seasons league play was dominated by BTuFC Viktoria 89 with Germania frustratingly able only to earn four second-place finishes.

=== Slide from prominence ===
In 1900 the team left to join the VDBV (Verband Deutscher Ballspiel Vereine or Federation of German Ballplay Teams) and in that same year became a founding member of the DFB (Deutscher Fussball Bund or German Football Association) at Leipzig. However, with the growth of the game and the arrival on the scene of many new teams Germania became less prominent. By the start of World War I, the club had fallen out of Berlin's top flight competition.

BFC Germania 1888 continued to play on the local amateur circuit. After World War II occupying Allied authorities banned all organizations in the country including sports and football clubs. BFC Germania's tradition was continued initially by the newly created SG Neu-Tempelhof. It appeared fleetingly in the Amateurliga Berlin (III) in 1948–49 where they were able only to earn a single point from a draw in 18 matches. Neu-Tempelhof was allowed to rename itself later to BFC Germania 1888, and the club kept that name since.

=== Current ===
Today the club plays lower-tier football in the local city leagues. In 2001 they competed in the Bezirksliga Berlin (VII) and over the course of the following two seasons advanced to the Verbandsliga Berlin (V) where they spent the next three seasons. The next three seasons saw the club relegated successively from the Verbandsliga to the Kreisliga Berlin A (IX). Since 2010 Germania has played in the Kreisliga Berlin B (X).

== Germany's oldest football club ==
German football clubs typically include the date of their founding in their club's name. A number of sides – for example SSV Ulm 1846, VfL Bochum, and TSV 1860 München – have earlier founding dates, but were formed as gymnastics or athletics clubs and did not take up football until Germania's formation.

Other teams which were formed before Germania including Berliner Cricket-Club 1883, BFC Frankfurt 1885, and SC Germania zu Hamburg 1887 (one of the predecessor sides which formed SV Hamburg in 1919) were also first organized to play other sports – cricket, rugby, and athletics respectively. Of these three clubs only Hamburg is still playing.

== Team trivia ==
- Deutscher FV 1878 Hannover is generally recognized as Germany's oldest football team but plays rugby, which shares a common origin with association football. BFC Germania 1888's claim as the country's oldest club is specific to playing association football.

BFC Germania 1888 has a rich sporting heritage and played an important role in the early development of football in Germany.

- BFC Germania 1888 players George Demmler and Fritz Boxhammer played active roles in the formation of both the BFV (Berliner Fußball-Verband or Berlin Football Federation) and the DFB (Deutscher Fussball Bund or German Football Association). Demmler went on to help found the Deutsche Sportbehörde für Leichtathletik (predecessor of the Deutscher Leichtathletik-Verband) and become its first president.
- The goalkeeper for Germany's first national side was Germania's Fritz Baumgarten – one of four club members who would be capped.
- The founders of Hertha BSC settled on their club's name as second choice to the already taken Germania.
- On 3 May 1889 a number of BFC Germania 1888 players left to form the new club BFC Marbert which was soon re-christened BFC Stern 1889.
- In 1898 BFC Germania 1888 became the first football club to form a youth department.
- German Crown Prince Wilhelm saw his first football match on 30 April 1905, a contest which pitted BFC Germania 1888 against the well-known English amateur side Civil Service London. BFC Germania 1888 won the match 3–2.

== See also ==
- Club of Pioneers
- Oldest football clubs
