= Sport in Hamburg =

Overview of sporting culture in Hamburg, Germany

This article covers sport in Hamburg, Germany — its history and role as part of the city's culture, both on a recreational and professional level. Over the last some 125 years, many international tournaments and championships were held here.

The main sports governing body in Hamburg, the Hamburg Sport Federation (Hamburger Sportbund, HSB) represents over 500,000 member in some 780 sport clubs. About 60 teams from Hamburg are playing in German first leagues (Bundesliga), the two best known clubs from Hamburg would be the Hamburger SV and the FC St. Pauli, both men's first teams playing in the German football leagues.

== History ==
Sport in Hamburg has a long and distinguished history. Hamburg sport clubs were instrumental in introducing British sports to Germany, or in some cases the continent as a whole. Next to ball and equestrian sports, water sports play an important role in Hamburg. Some of the founders of the German Football Association (DFB) came from Hamburg. One of the world's oldest rowing clubs is based in Hamburg.

The Vierländer Schützengesellschaft (approximate translation: Vierlande Shooting Club) is one of the oldest still existing organisation in Hamburg. It was established in 1592. In 1830 the Hamburg Chess Club (Hamburger Schachklub, HSK or HSK von 1830) was founded. Der Hamburger Ruder Club (Note: "Ruder(n)" is the German term for 'rowing') was founded in 1836, as one of the oldest rowing clubs in the world. In 1934 it was merged with the Germania Ruder Club (GRC), to form Der Hamburger und Germania Ruder Club (HGRC). The Germania Ruder Club's coxed fours won rowing at the 1900 Summer Olympics in Paris. On 20 January 1900, the FC Association 1893 Hamburg and FC Eintracht Altona were two of 86 founders of the German Football Association. As old as the history of sports clubs in Hamburg, as old is the history of competing and hosting tournaments. The 3rd Chess Olympiad organized by the German Chess Federation took place between 13 and 27 July 1930, in Hamburg. 12 players from the Hamburg Chess Club won the German Team Championship in 1956 and 1958. In 1987 the Hamburg Chess Club were German Cup winner (Pokalsieger).

For the 2006 World Cup the Volksparkstadion became a FIFA World Cup Stadium for five matches, among others the quarter-finals Italy vs. Ukraine on 30 June 2006. Boxing for international titles like the heavyweight championship of the International Boxing Federation in 2003 and 2008 between Tony Thompson and Wladimir Klitschko were held in Hamburg.

In July 2008 the Fourth World University Championship for beach volleyball was held in Hamburg. The Team Hamburg Beijing for the 2008 Summer Olympics consisted of 48 athletes. In 2010 the UEFA Cup final was held at the Volksparkstadion. As of March 2015, Hamburg is in the process of submitting an application to host the 2024 Summer Olympics, a bid supported by the German Olympic Sports Confederation (DOSB).

== Professional sport ==
=== Professional sport teams ===
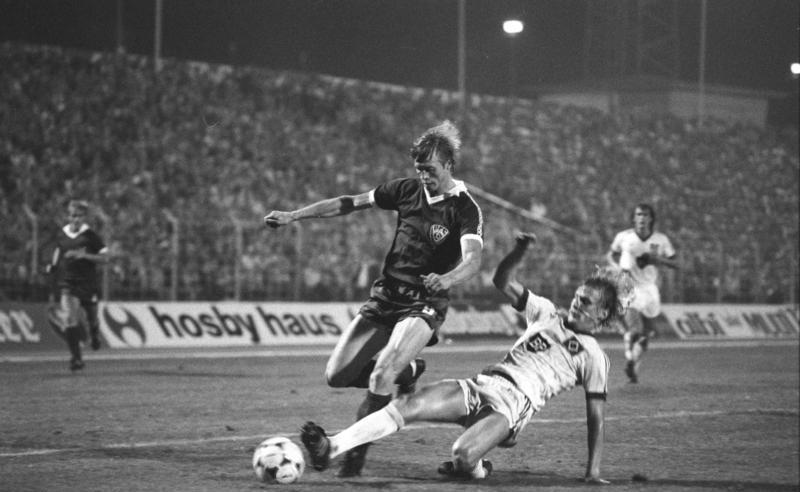
HSV - BFC Dynamo in Berlin in 1982

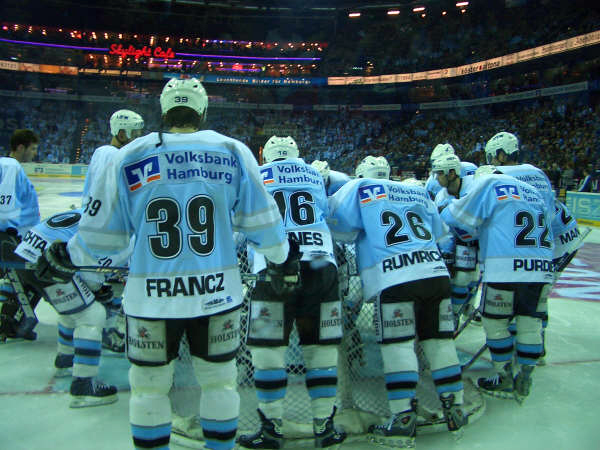
Hamburg Freezers - Frankfurt in 2006

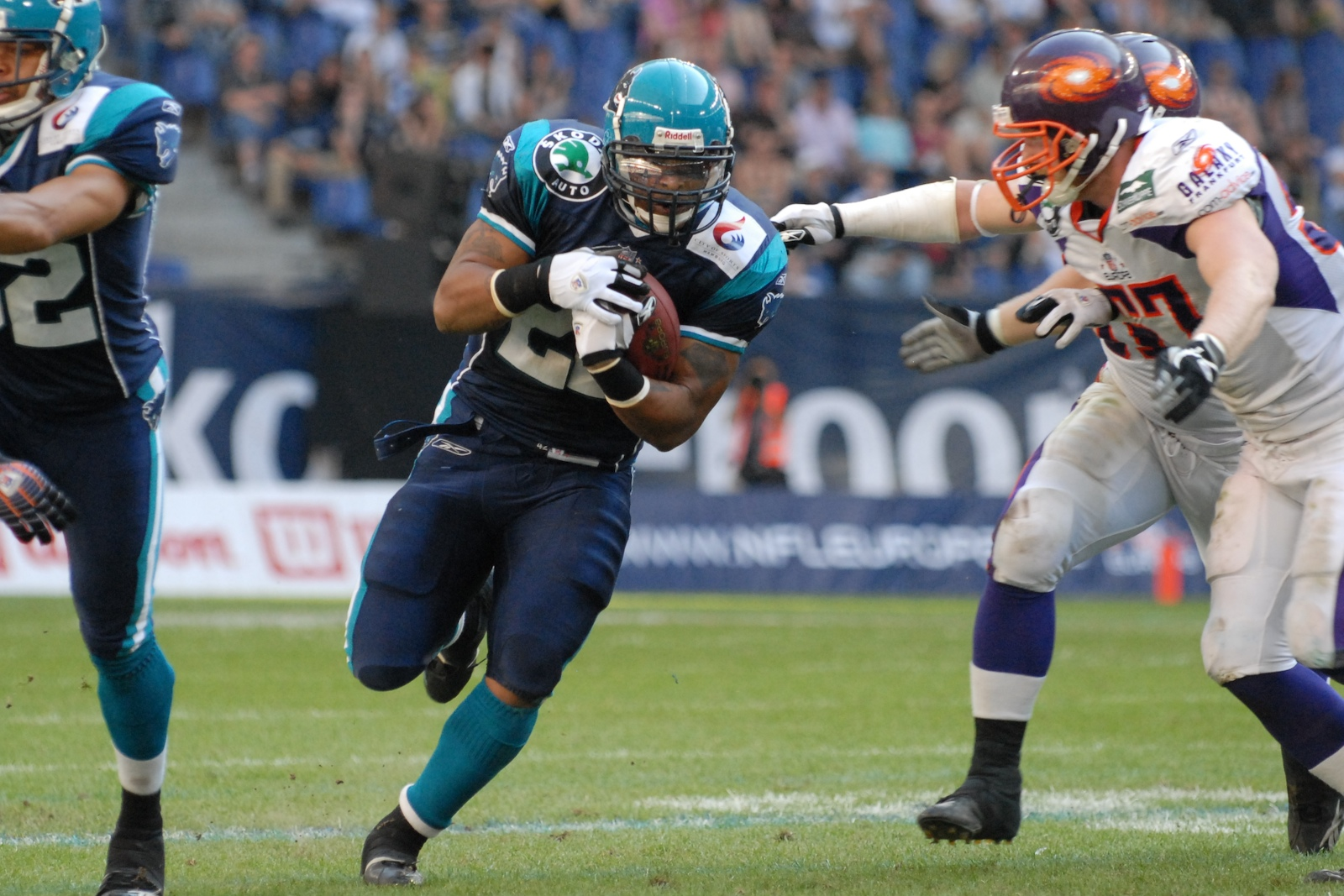
Hamburg Sea Devils - Frankfurt in 2007

About 60 teams were fighting in German first leagues (Bundesliga) in 2007.

==== Ball sports ====
The association football men's team Hamburger SV (HSV), one of the most successful teams in Germany, is a football team in the 2. Bundesliga. HSV is a six time German champion, a three time German cup winner and triumphed in the European cup in 1977 and 1983 and has played in the group stages of the Champions League twice; in 2000–01 and in 2006–07. Additionally, FC St. Pauli is also a 2. Bundesliga football club. The HSV Handball represents Hamburg in the German handball league. Another first league team is NA. Hamburg Volleyball.

Hamburg Blue Devils was one of the prominent American football teams playing in German Football League before its exit in 2017. Hamburg Sea Devils is a team of European League of Football (ELF) which is a planned professional league, that is set to become the first league in Europe since the demise of NFL Europe. The Sea Devils will start playing games in June 2021.

The FC St. Pauli dominates women's Rugby in Germany. Hamburg is home to the Hamburg Dockers, an Australian rules football club.

There is a football club Polonia Hamburg for the Polish diaspora in the city.

==== Baseball and Softball ====
The HSV Stealers play first division Baseball as well as the Hamburg Knights do so in Softball.

==== Basketball ====
The BCJ Hamburg played in the Basketball Bundesliga from 1999 to 2001. Later, the Hamburg Towers became the city's prime team. The Towers promoted to Germany's top division in 2019. In 2022, they already reached the playoffs. The Towers play their home games at the Inselpark Arena in Wilhelmsburg.

==== Chess ====
One of the world top chess players comes from the Hamburg Chess Club and is playing in the Chess Bundesliga, the Grand Master Jan Gustafsson was in the Top 100 Players list on rank 85 in April 2005.

==== Cricket and lacrosse ====
There are also several minority sports clubs, surprisingly Hamburg has four cricket clubs, THCC Rot-Gelb (Alster CC), Pak Alemi CC, Hamburg International CC and HSV Cricket. HSV Cricket is playing in the league of the North German Cricket Federation and won several first places. There is also the lacrosse team Hamburg Warriors at the Harvestehuder Tennis- und Hockey-Club (HTHC).

==== Field hockey ====
Hamburg is the nation's hockey capital and dominates the men's as well as the women's Bundesliga with teams like Der Club an der Alster, Großflottbeker THGC, Klipper THC, Hamburger Polo Club Harvestehuder THC or Uhlenhorster HC.

==== Icehockey ====
The Hamburg Freezers represented Hamburg in the highest ice hockey league in Germany.

==== Polo ====
The women team Polo Ladies from the Hamburg Polo Club plays also in one of the German first or second leagues. In 2004, 2005, 2006 and 2007 the men's team won the high goal class of the German Polo Championship.

== Sport venues and facilities ==
Major sport venues and facilities in Hamburg

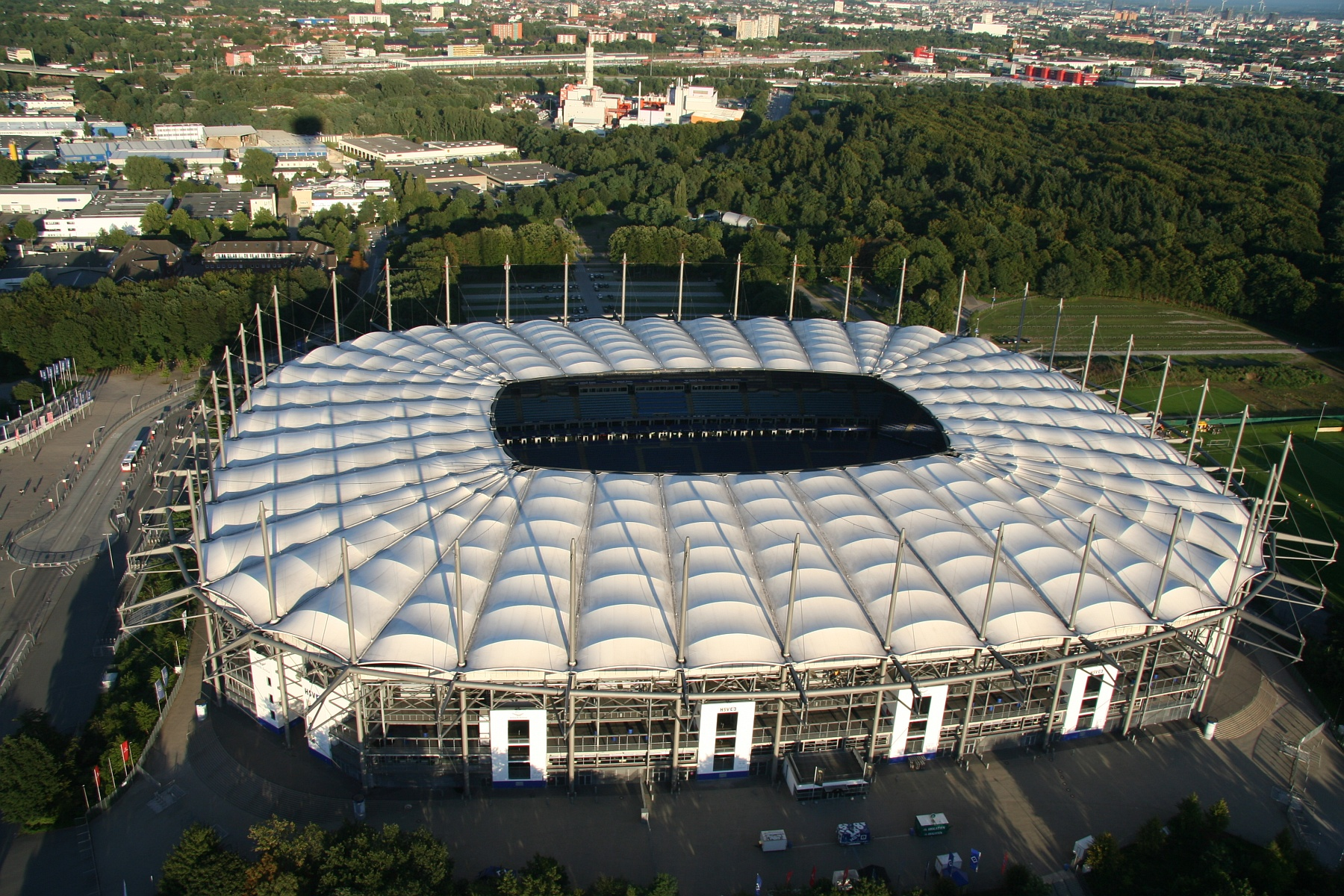
The Volksparkstadion (Imtech Arena) at Altona Volkspark in Bahrenfeld

The Centre Court of Tennis Stadium Am Rothenbaum has a capacity of 13,200 people and is the largest tennis venue in Germany.

Most of the sports stadiums can be used as music concert venues and for other events too. The FC St. Pauli play at the Millerntor-Stadion in the St. Pauli quarter near the infamous Reeperbahn. The Volksparkstadion, (Note: Former names include HSH Nordbank Arena or AOL Arena) (seats 50,000) home to the Hamburger SV, was a venue for Bruce Springsteen's Magic Tour. Hamburg Freezers and HSV Handball play at O2 World, formerly known as Color Line Arena. The Alsterschwimmhalle is Hamburg's largest aquatic center, completed in 1973 and used for swimming events.

Venue	Location	Max. audience
Volksparkstadion	Bahrenfeld	57,300
Horn Racecourse (Rennbahn)	Horn	50,000
Billtalstadion	Bergedorf	30,000
Millerntor-Stadion	St. Pauli	29,600
O_{2} World	Bahrenfeld	13,800
Am Rothenbaum	Rotherbaum	13,200
Stadion Hoheluft	Eppendorf	11,000
Jahn-Arena (Kampfbahn)	Winterhude	8,000
Adolf-Jäger-Arena (Kampfbahn)	Ottensen	8,000
Sporthalle	Winterhude	7,000
eVendi Arena	Altona-Nord	6,100
Klein Flottbek Derby Park	Nienstedten	4,500
Inselparkhalle	Wilhelmsburg	3,400
Wolfgang-Meyer-Sportground (Sportanlage)	Stellingen	2,400
Bahrenfeld Racecourse (Trabrennbahn)	Bahrenfeld	?
Stellingen Velodrome (Radrennbahn)	Stellingen	?
Volksbank Arena	Bahrenfeld	900

Dulsberg is the location of one of Germany's largest Olympic Training Centers (Olympiastützpunkt or OSP), while there are also other training facilities in Allermöhe and the wider Hamburg Metropolitan Region.

== Sport events ==
=== Regular sport events ===
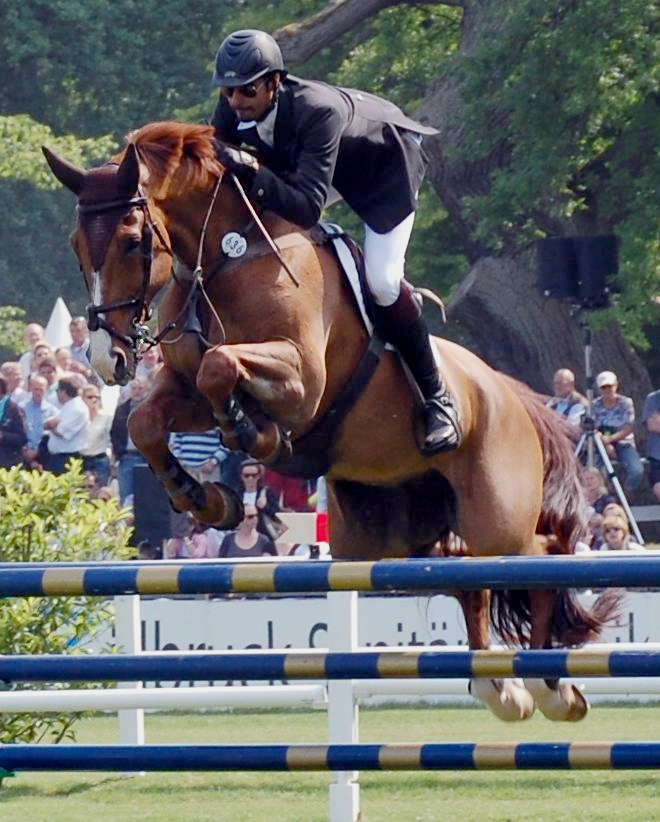
Deutsches Derby, 2011

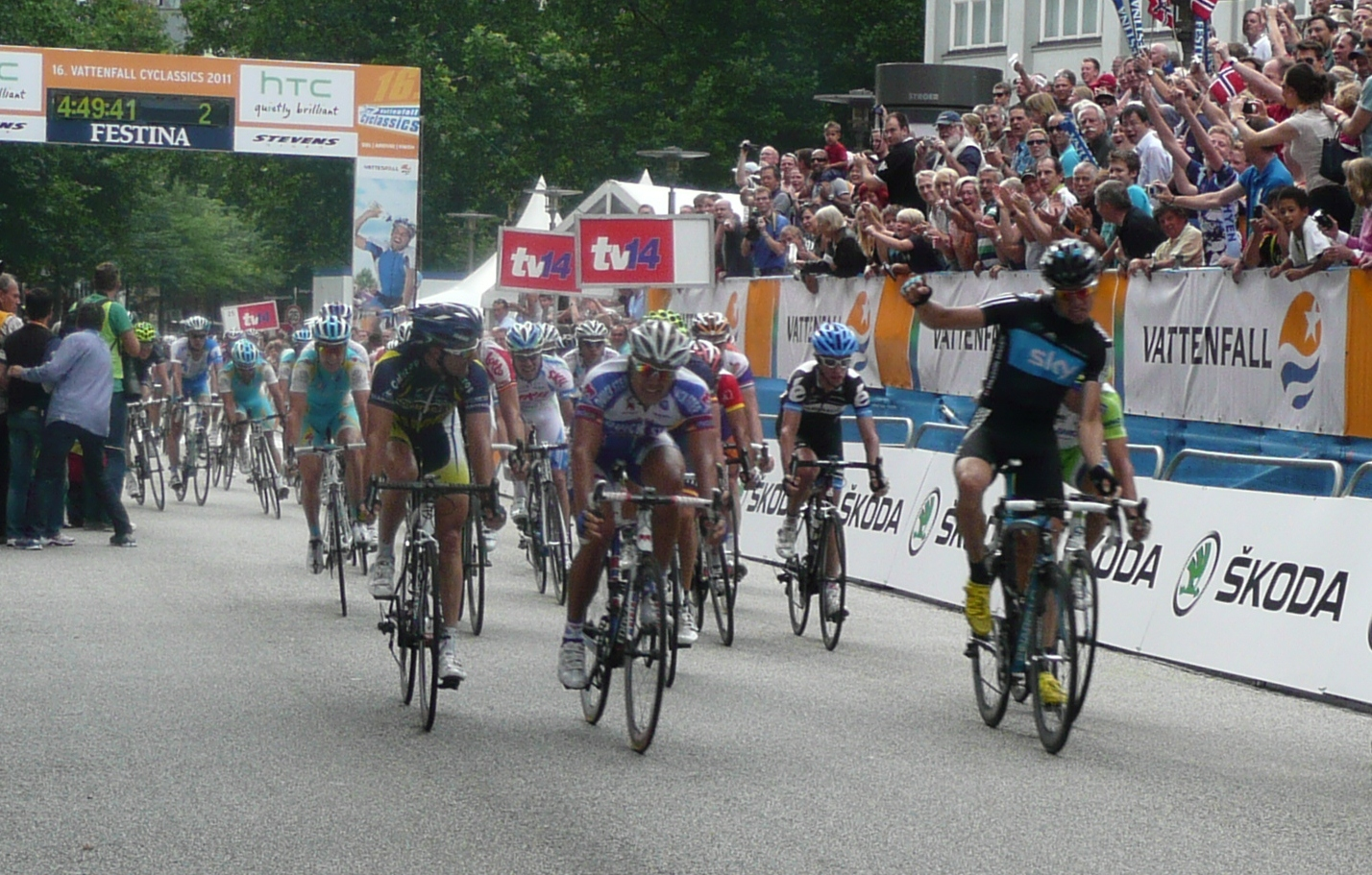
Vattenfall Cyclassics, 2011

Hamburg hosts equestrian events at Klein Flottbek Derby Park (Deutsches Derby in jumping and dressage) and Horn Racecourse (Deutsches Derby in flat racing). The Berenberg Polo Derby is medium goal polo tournament, hosted by the German Polo Federation. Since 1979 the derby is held almost annually at the Hamburger Polo Club in Klein Flottbek.

The Hamburg Marathon is Germany's largest marathon after Berlin. In 2008, 23,230 participants were registered.

Worldcups in cycling, the UCI ProTour competition Vattenfall Cyclassics, and the ITU Triathlon Worldcup known as Hamburg City Man are also major events in Hamburg. Both events have an all comers´ race.

Event	Location	Since
Deutsches Derby	Horn	1869
German Open Tennis Championships	Rothenbaum	1892
Berenberg Polo Derby	Klein Flottbek	1906
Deutsches Spring- und Dressurderby	Klein Flottbek	1920
Hamburg Marathon	throughout Hamburg	1986
Hamburg Half Marathon	throughout Hamburg	1995
Vattenfall Cyclassics	throughout Hamburg	1996
German Masters (curling)	Curling Club Hamburg	2012

In 2008 the German Tennis Federation (DTB) and the Association of Tennis Professionals (ATP) were divided about the status of the Hamburg Masters tournament as part of the ATP Masters Series.

The field hockey Hamburg Masters were held as a four-nation tournament.

=== Other national or international sport events ===
Event	Year
European Figure Skating Championships	1891
German Gymnastics Festival	1898
German Athletics Championships	1898
German Athletics Championships	1900
German Athletics Championships	1901
German Athletics Championships	1902
German Athletics Championships	1903
World Shooting Championships	1909
German Athletics Championships	1921
Chess Olympiad	1930
Women's World Chess Championship	1930
German Gymnastics Festival	1953
German Athletics Championships	1954
German Badminton Championships	1958
German Athletics Championships	1962
European Karate Championships	1970

Event	Year
German Athletics Championships	1977
German Swimming Championships	1977
World Fencing Championships	1978
German Athletics Championships	1989
Men's European Volleyball Championship	1991
German Swimming Championships	1991
German Gymnastics Festival	1994
German Swimming Championships	1998
German Swimming Championships	2003
Triathlon World Championships	2007
European Polo Championships	2008
European Beach Volleyball Championships	2008
U17 World Basketball Championships	2010
World Rowing Cup (II)	2011
Sprint Distance Triathlon World Championships	2013
Sprint Distance Triathlon World Championships	2014

== Non professional sport ==
Non professional or recreational sports in clubs is represented by several associations. The Hamburg Sport Federation (Hamburger Sportbund, HSB) is the umbrella organisation for all sports clubs in Hamburg. Existing since 1945, in 2007 the HSB represented 502,571 member in 780 clubs with 53 sports associations. The Association for Gymnastics (Verband für Turnen und Freizeit (VTF) ) has more than 100,000 members, followed by the Association for Football (soccer) (Hamburger Fussballbund (HFB) ). Members of the HFB are among others the Hamburger SV with more than 40,000 and the FC St. Pauli with more than 6,000 members.

There is also a wide array of student and school sport.

Figures of the sports associations in the HSB
Association for	1985	1990	2004	2005	2006	2007
Gymnastics	82,040	81,339	129,362	129,955	133,768	138,208
Football (soccer)	46,261	40,368	70,134	73,285	79,918	96,032
Tennis	37,674	38,986	32,220	30,724	28,308	27,982
Sailing	10,940	11,636	12,029	12,173	11,979	11,896
Swimming	14,097	12,687	11,061	10,717	10,733	10,068
Handball	14,744	11,885	9,383	9,725	9,510	9,171
Hockey (Note: Hockey means here both indoor and field hockey.)	5,513	5,805	8,391	8,695	8,021	8,001
Horseback riding and vaulting	6,490	5,892	8,287	8,231	7,819	7,703
Golfing (extraordinary members)	n	n	7,720	8,099	8,350	8,752
Golfing (ordinary members)	5,251	6,699	7,965	8,111	8,334	7,614
Volleyball	9,391	9,984	6,592	6,405	6,426	6,375
Dancing	9,848	10,114	6,522	6,507	6,254	6,171
Basketball	3,403	4,717	5,575	5,588	5,789	6,017
Table tennis	8,626	8,825	6,115	5,999	5,955	5,783
Angling (Recreational)	8,836	8,041	7,324	7,124	6,834	5,204
Rowing	4,391	4,675	4,942	4,956	5,075	5,110
Judo	5,337	6,501	5,199	5,361	5,293	5,027
Shooting	6,625	6,615	5,232	5,107	4,983	4,841
Track and field athletics	6,312	5,172	4,520	4,551	4,672	4,770
Mountaineering and rock climbing	n	n	768	917	2,389	4,252
Canoeing	3,082	3,061	3,632	3,671	3,537	3,505
Sports for the disabled	1,435	2,138	2,634	2,406	2,639	3,003
Badminton	3,144	3,557	2,992	2,788	2,742	2,653
Karate	1,763	2,861	2,817	2,821	2,585	2,515
Chess	2,663	2,753	2,468	2,437	2,491	2,401
Chess	1,017	934	1,571	1,593	1,851	1,894
Skiing	3,510	3,566	2,298	2,009	1,997	1,849
Bowling	10,611	6,592	2,152	1,908	1,842	1,727
Jujutsu	n	n	1,885	1,841	1,791	1,655
Diving (Note: Diving is here under water diving.)	641	948	1,307	1,297	1,276	1,261
Motorboat sports	657	718	1,289	1,288	1,218	1,215
Air sports	1,123	1,280	921	898	1,047	1,013
American football	n	n	1,213	1,067	923	962
Boxing	803	603	1,063	1,034	884	956
Taekwondo	516	659	1,078	963	967	849
Rolling sports	n	n	517	583	618	678
Ice hockey	n	n	625	659	640	677
Fencing	670	620	619	675	681	645
Baseball	n	462	605	569	550	567
Rugby	325	386	474	440	450	520
Ice sports	1,264	1,324	454	456	496	489
Triathlon	n	91	281	297	337	426
Hiking (HSB)	869	1,015	389	384	372	374
Squash	428	844	448	395	386	349
Motorsports (ordinary members)	798	907	205	175	294	347
Motorsports (extraordinary members)	n	n	725	760	669	682
Aikido	n	n	326	317	412	344
Angling (Comparative)	n	n	125	476	400	333
Pétanque	n	n	231	263	213	297
Weightlifting	n	n	267	265	242	246
Wrestling	679	773	271	244	234	232
Miniature golf	385	436	274	234	232	208
Darts	n	n	222	211	184	172
Cue sports	96	125	38	108	141	165
Cycling-Solidarity	n	n	136	139	144	144
Cricket	n	n	238	181	165	86
Hiking (VTF)	n	n	341	251	185	74
Water skiing	n	n	65	58	60	57
Polo	16	16	37	38	36	34
Acrobatics	n	n	10	13	14	17

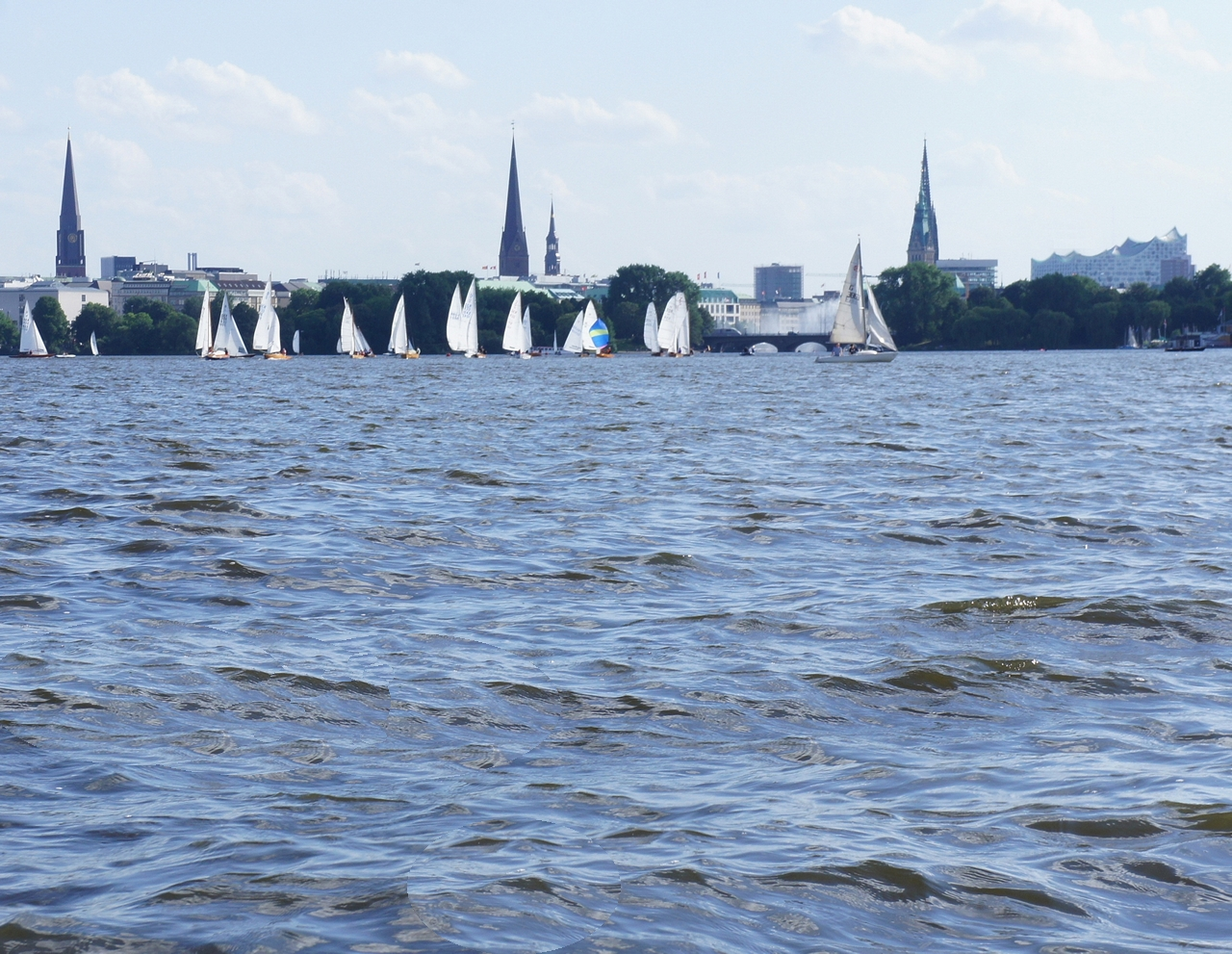
Sailing on the Außenalster

== See also ==
- Sport in Germany
- Sport in Europe
