= Sportbrüder Leipzig =

German association football club

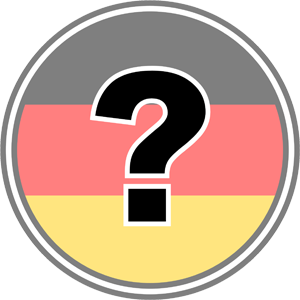
- Full name: Sport-Club Sportbrüder 1893 Leipzig
- Founded: 11 November 1893
- Dissolved: 2 November 1900
- Ground: Exerzierplatz (until 1899); Sportplatz (from 1900)
Home colours	Away colours

SC Sportbrüder Leipzig was a German association football club from the city of Leipzig, Saxony and was notable as a predecessor side of VfB Leipzig, one of the founding member of the DFB (Deutsche Fußball Bund or German Football Association) at Leipzig in 1900. Established on 11 November 1893, by 17-year-olds Johannes Kirmse and Albert Rößler, it was one of the earliest football clubs in the city, formed the same year as Leipzig BC 1893 and FC Lipsia 1893, and just one year after VfK Südwest Leipzig. These four clubs and Abteilung Bewegungsspiele der Leipziger Finkenschaft shared the Exerzierplatz, a former military parade ground in the city's Rosental neighbourhood as their ground until its closure in 1899.

The footballers were originally part of ATV Leipzig 1845, which also included athletics and cycling departments. SC became independent of the parent club on 26 May 1896, being spurred on by a loss to Leipzig BC and the demanding training schedule being enforced by the athletics association. Initially the squad consisted almost exclusively of students under 20 years old from a local Realschule.

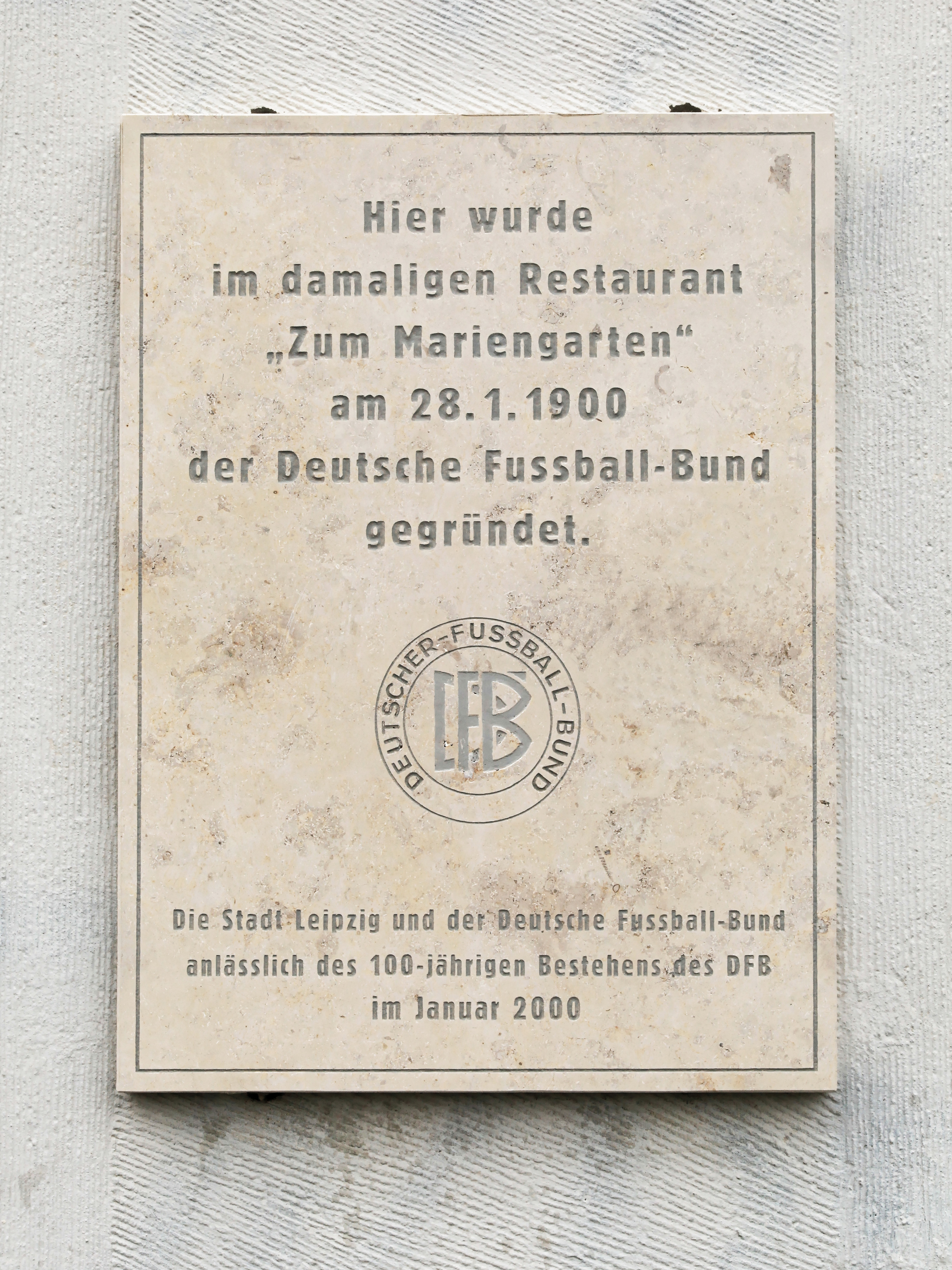
Plaque outside Zum Marriengarten which commemorates the founding of the German Football Association.

At a 1898 meeting at the restaurant Zum Mariengarten - the same location where the German Football Association would later be founded - Sportbrüder Leipzig merged with VfB Leipzig to form VfB Sportbrüder 1893 Leipzig which struggled through the next two seasons being able to earn only consecutive fourth-place finishes. After 2 November 1900, the combined side was known simply as VfB Leipzig and would go on to win the country's first football championship in 1903 in a decisive 7:2 victory over DFC Prag

The traditions of the Sportbrüder side were carried forward within VfB through to the end of World War II. A complex series of successor sides emerged within East German competition after end of the war in 1945 with more than one team laying claim to the traditions of the club.

== Germany's First Marathon ==
The athletic department of Sportbrüder organized the country's first marathon on 5 September 1897 from Paunsdorf to Bennewitz and back, for which eighteen participants signed up. At 6 am the race began at Neuen Gasthof in Paunsdorf with Theodor Schöffler, a referee for VfB Sportbrüder 1893 Leipzig and future founder of the German Football Association, being the first out of thirteen participants to cross the finish line at a time of 3:35:51. According to media reports, the race was received well by spectators. Another race took place the following year, but this time organised by the newly founded Deutschen Sportbehörde für Athletik (German Sports Authority for Athletics). The athletic's division also had a prominent ice skating team which skated on Bad Rohrteich in Schönefeld. They hosted various races such as a 1200m ice skating race and a 600m race for the club championship.

The first national marathon championship in Germany was held in 1925 with the course beginning in Halle and ending in Leipzig to commemorate the Sportbrüder athletics department's contribution to, and establishment of, the sport.
