= The Big Game (1942 film) =

1942 film directed by Robert A. Stemmle

- Directed by: Robert A. Stemmle
- Written by: Toni Huppertz; Richard Kirn; Robert A. Stemmle
- Starring: René Deltgen; Gustav Knuth; Heinz Engelmann
- Cinematography: Erich Rossel; Bruno Stephan
- Edited by: Ludolf Grisebach; Frieda Zillich
- Music by: Michael Jary
- Production company: Bavaria Film
- Distributed by: Deutsche Filmvertriebs
- Release date: 10 July 1942
- Running time: 85 minutes
- Country: Germany
- Language: German

The Big Game (German: Das große Spiel) is a 1942 German sports film directed by Robert A. Stemmle and starring René Deltgen, Gustav Knuth and Heinz Engelmann. It featured famous German footballers of the era. National coach Sepp Herberger arranged for many German international footballers to be recalled from fighting in the Second World War, ostensibly to improve the quality of the film, but actually to try to protect them from the horrors of war.

Some sequences of the film are in Agfacolor. The sets were designed by art directors Gerbert Hochreiter and Walter Schlick.

== Partial cast ==
- René Deltgen as Mittelstürmer Werner Fehling
- Gustav Knuth as Trainer Karl Wildbrandt
- Heinz Engelmann as Torwart Jupp Jäger
- Maria Andergast as Annemarie Sand
- Karl Schönböck as Fotograf Richter
- Josef Sieber as Vereins-Senior Vater Gabler
- Ruth Lommel as Verkäuferin Flora Tietze
- Wolfgang Staudte as Fritz Eysoldt
- Lucy Millowitsch as Frau Eysoldt
- Hans Appel as Player
- Fritz Balogh as Player
- Andreas Kupfer as Player
- Ernst Lehner as Player
- Fritz Walter as Player
- Gerta Böttcher as Ilse Klebusch
- Tino Carocci as Otto Wendland
- Karl Ludwig Diehl as SS-Mann
- Erich Dunskus as spectator of the penalty shootout
- Hermann Eppenhoff as Player
- Adolf Fischer as Heini Gabler
- Albert Florath as Pförtner
- Ulla Gauglitz as Edith Schladebach
- Rudi Gellesch as Player
- Erich Goede as Player
- Paul Henckels as SA-Ordner
- Sepp Herberger as spectator
- Max Schmeling as spectator
- Lucie Höflich as Wirtin Frau Klebusch
- Hilde Jansen as Grete Gabler
- Herbert Klatt as Bruno Mielke

== Bibliography ==
- Hesse-Lichtenbeger, Ulrich (2003). Tor!: The Story of German Football. London: WSC Books Ltd. ISBN 978-0-9540134-5-5.

== See also ==
- List of association football films
