= Eintracht =

Eintracht (German for 'accord' / 'agreement' / 'harmony'; pronounced [ˈaɪntʁaxt]) may refer to the following football and sports clubs:

Germany

- FC Eintracht Altona
- Eintracht Bad Kreuznach
- FC Eintracht Bamberg
- Eintracht Baunatal
- Eintracht 01 Berlin
- Eintracht Braunschweig
- TSC Eintracht Dortmund
- Eintracht Duisburg 1848
- Eintracht Frankfurt
- Eintracht Frankfurt Basketball
- Eintracht Frankfurt Rugby
- Eintracht Mahlsdorf
- FC Eintracht Norderstedt 03
- Eintracht Nordhorn
- FC Eintracht Rheine
- FC Eintracht Schwerin
- TSV Eintracht Stadtallendorf
- SV Eintracht Trier 05
- Eintracht Wetzlar
- SpVgg Eintracht Glas-Chemie Wirges

Other countries

- S.C. Eintracht, United States
- SK Eintracht Wels, Austria
