= Stan Taylor =

Stanley or Stan Taylor may refer to:

== Sports ==
- Stan Taylor (athlete) (born 1937), British runner
- Stanley Taylor (cricketer) (1875–1965), English cricketer
- Stanley Taylor (boxer), opponent of Michael Marrone

== Others ==
- Stan Taylor (academic), academic specialising in doctoral education
- Stan Taylor (barrister) (1896–1982), Australian barrister and judge
- Stan Taylor (trade unionist) (1909–1966), British trade unionist
- Stanley Taylor (actor) (1900–1980}, American actor in films such as Red Lips (1928)
- Stan Taylor, perpetrator of Russell Street bombing

== See also ==
- Stanner Taylor, actor
