= Germany national football team results (unofficial matches) =

This is a list of the Germany national football team's results from 1897 to the present day that, for various reasons, are not accorded the status of official internationals.

== 1890s ==
=== 1897 ===
On 18 April 1897, an early international game on German soil was played in Hamburg when a selection team from the Danish Football Association defeated a selection team from the Hamburg-Altona Football Association, 5–0.

| 18 April 1897 Friendly | Altona FA (German Empire) | 0–5 | Denmark | Hamburg, Germany |
| | ? (?) | Report | ? (?) | Attendance: 5,000 |

=== 1898 ===
On 12 December 1898, a German national selection traveled to Paris to play two friendlies against French teams, beating The White Rovers 7–0, and on the following day, 13 December, they claimed a 2–1 victory over a selection of the best Parisian players from the USFSA. This was the first-ever version of a Germany national selection, even though it was drawn almost exclusively from Berlin clubs, such as BFC Germania 1888, Berliner SV 1892, Viktoria Berlin, and Fortuna Berlin.

| 12 December 1898 Friendly | The White Rovers (Paris) | 0–7 | Germany XI | Paris, France |
| | | Report |

| 13 December 1898 Friendly | Select Paris | 1–2 | Germany XI | Paris, France |
| | Meggs Geo Arnull; Barnold, Sid Wood; Bernat, Tunmer, J. Hicks; O. Hicks, Jack Wood, Meggs, Grandjean, Fraysse | Report | ? L. Friese; Westendarf, Paul I Franz, Bensenmann, ScAucker; Paul II, O. Baudach, Wheeler, Walter, Welzler |
Note: Some of the German names are pseudonyms.

=== 1899 ===
In November 1899, Germany faced England five times. The England team played a representative German team in Berlin on 23 November 1899, with the German side losing 1–0. Two days later, a slightly altered German side lost 10–2. The third and fourth matches were played in Prague and Karlsruhe against a combined Austrian and German side, and England won 6–0 and 7–0.

| 23 November 1899 Friendly | Germany | 2–13 | England | Berlin, Germany |
| | Jestram; Bock | Report | Chadwick; Brown; Wilson; Forman; Bassett | Attendance: 1,500; Referee: Stanley Taylor |
Note: All but one of the German team played for local clubs

| 24 November 1899 Friendly | Germany | 2–10 | England | Berlin, Germany |
| | Jestram; Bock | Report | Rogers; Forman; Taylor; Bassett | Attendance: 512; Referee: John D. Cox |
Note: A rematch was staged at 10 a.m. on the following day, so that the FA party could catch the afternoon train to Prague. The visitors made two changes and fielded six full internationals, whilst the Germans included six members of the previous day's team.

| 26 November 1899 Friendly | Austria | 0–8 | England | Prague, Austria |
| | | Report | Rogers; Wilson; Bassett; Chadwick; Brown | Attendance: Unknown; Referee: Unknown |
Note: The English visitors beat a team of players mostly made up from Bohemian clubs, with two from Vienna. At the time, Bohemia was part of the Austrian Empire.

| 28 November 1899 Friendly | Germany | 0–7 | England | Berlin, Germany |
| | | Report | Taylor; Edgar Chadwick; Rogers; Brown | Attendance: 3,000; Referee: Walther Bensemann |
Note: The FA party travelled to south-western Germany for the final game of the tour and played with six full internationals, while Germany fielded five of the team that had lost to them in Berlin, four days earlier

== 1900s ==
| 8 April 1900 Friendly | South-Germany (Germany) | 2–0 | Switzerland XI | Strasbourg, Germany |
| | | Report |

| 20 January 1901 Friendly | Switzerland XI | 4–7 | (Germany) South-Germany | Basel, Switzerland |
| | | Report |

| 25 September 1901 Friendly | England | 10–0 | Germany | Manchester, England |
| | Bloomer; Wooldridge; Calvey; Wharton | | | Stadium: Hyde Road; Attendance: 5,500; Referee: John Lewis |

Although the England Amateur team was not created until 1906, the first appearance of an English team containing only amateur players dates back to 21 September 1901, when they beat a German touring side, 12-0, at White Hart Lane, London.

| 21 September 1901 Unofficial friendly | England Amateurs | 12 – 0 | Germany | London, England |
| | Foster; Farnfield; Smith; Ryder; Hales | Report | | Stadium: White Hart Lane; Attendance: 6,000 |
Note: Reginald Foster scored 6, but one source gives 7

== 1910s ==
| 31 May 1914 Friendly | Central Switzerland | 0–1 | (Germany) South-Germany | Bern, Switzerland |
| | | Report |

| 22 July 1923 Friendly | South-Germany (Germany) | 3–3 | Central Switzerland | Karlsruhe, Germany |
| | | Report |

| 25 May 1924 International friendly | Central Switzerland | 3–1 | (Germany) South-Germany | Biel, Switzerland |
| | | Report | | Attendance: 2,500 |

| 30 May 1926 International friendly | South-Germany (Germany) | 1–4 | Central Switzerland | Freiburg im Breisgau, Germany |
| | | Report |

== 1950s ==
| 29 June 1952 International friendly | Germany Olympic (Germany) | 2–3 | Switzerland Espoirs | Kiel, Germany |
| | ? | Report | Mauron 55', 68' ? | Stadium: Holstein-Stadion; Attendance: 30,000; Referee: Leo Helge (Denmark) |

| 2 September 1953 International friendly | West Germany (Germany) | 2–0 | Switzerland XI | Konstanz, Germany |
| | ? | Report | | Stadium: Bodensee Stadion; Attendance: 23,000; Referee: Bernardini (Italy) |

| 11 October 1953 International friendly | Switzerland XI | 1–2 | (Germany) West Germany B | Basel, Switzerland |
| | Meier 37' | Report | ? | Stadium: Stadion Rankhof; Referee: Jacques Devillers (France) |

| 26 March 1958 International friendly | Switzerland XI | 1–2 | (Germany) Germany XI | Basel, Switzerland |
| | Riva 33' | Report | ? | Stadium: St. Jakob Stadium; Attendance: 35,000; Referee: P. Mourat (France) |

== 2020s ==
| 1 June 2026 Training match | Germany (Germany) | 1–0 | Finland | Frankfurt, Germany |
| | Arifi (o.g.) | Report | | Stadium: DFB-Campus; Attendance: c. 1,000 |
