= Walter Jestram =

German footballer

Personal information
- Place of birth: Germany
- Position: Defender

Senior career*
Years	Team	Apps	(Gls)
1888–1898	BFC Germania 1888		
1898–1905	Berliner SV 1892		

International career
1898–1899	Germany (unofficial)	4	(2)
1899–1905	Berlin XI	2	(1)
- * Club domestic league appearances and goals

Walter Jestram was a German footballer who played as a Defender for BFC Germania 1888 and Berliner SV 1892 at the turn of the century.

== Playing career ==
=== Club career ===
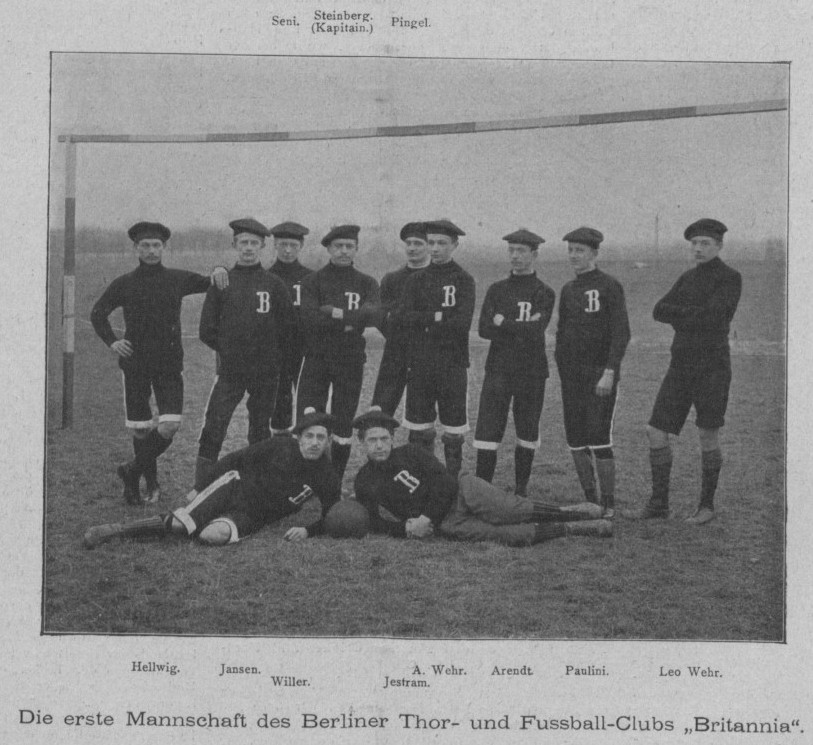
Jestram (lying bottom right) as a player of the FC Britannia in 1898

On 15 April 1888, Jestram, together with his brothers Paul, Max, and Fritz, and seven school friends from Askanischen Gymnasium, founded the BFC Germania 1888, the oldest football club in Germany still in existence today. There was no football pitches at the time, so BFC was the first club to play on the Tempelhofer field, where an airport would later be constructed.

He stayed at the club for a decade, from 1888 until 1898, being thus a member of the side that won the first (unofficial) German championship in 1890, which was organized by the Association of German Football Players, the first German football association. From 1902 to 1904, he played for local rivals Berliner SV 1892, with whom he won the Berlin championship twice, which qualified the clubs for the finals of the German football championship in 1903 and 1904. In the former, Berliner was knocked out in the quarter-final by the eventual German champions VfB Leipzig, and in the latter, they reached the final against the reigning champions Leipzig, but the match ended up being canceled.

=== International career ===
On 12 December 1898, Jestram started for a German selection in a friendly match in Paris against The White Rovers, a club team that consisted mostly of English players, helping his side to a 7–0 win in front of 580 spectators, and the following day, they defeated a Paris XI 2–1. (Note: The Parisian newspapers refer to him by the pseudonym of "Walter".) This was the first-ever version of a Germany national selection, even though it was drawn almost exclusively from Berlin clubs, such as BFC Germania 1888, Berliner SV 1892, Viktoria Berlin, and Fortuna Berlin.

On 29 October 1899, Jestram started for a Berlin XI in a friendly against a Vienna XI at the WAC-Platz, scoring the opening goal in the 15th minute in an eventual 2–0 win. In the following month, on 23 and 24 November, Jestram played in two unofficial historical matches between selections from Germany and England; Germany was trashed on both occasions (2–13 and 2–10), with Jestram scoring one of the consolation goals in both matches. In the following day, Andrew Pitcairn-Knowles, the editor of the Berlin illustrated magazine Sport im Bild., wrote that "the heroes of the day were Jestram, Willer and Kralle".

Two years later, on 21 September 1901, Jestram started in another match against England, which ended in a 12–0 loss. Six years later, on 5 March 1905, he played in another Berlin-Vienna match, this time at home, helping his side to a 3–1 win.

== Career statistics ==
Scores and results list Germany's goal tally first, score column indicates score after each Jestram goal.

List of international goals scored by Walter Jestram
No.	Date	Venue	Opponent	Score	Result	Competition	Refs
1	29 October 1899	WAC-Platz, Vienna, Austria	(Austria) Vienna	1–0	2–0	Friendly match	
2	23 November 1899	Athletik-Sportsplatz, Berlin, Germany	England	?	2–13	Friendly match	
2	24 November 1899	Athletik-Sportsplatz, Berlin, Germany	England	?	2–10	Friendly match	

== Honours ==
Berliner SV 1892

- German football championship: 1904
