= Akademischer BC 1897 Charlottenburg =

German football club

Akademischer BC
- Full name: Akademischer Ballspiel-Club 1897 Charlottenburg
- Founded: 31 May 1897
- Ground: Kleiner Exerzierplatz
- –: defunct
Home colours	Away colours

Akademischer Ballspiel-Club 1897 Charlottenburg was a German association football club based in the Charlottenburg district of Berlin. Founded on 31 May 1897, it is notable as one of the founding clubs of the German Football Association (Deutscher Fussball Bund or German Football Association) in Leipzig in 1900.

Akademischer BC was established as a separate club out of the Akademischer Sport-Club 1893 Berlin after disputes within the membership of that club. It was made up of students from the Technische Hochschule in Charlottenburg (now Technische Universität Berlin). The team played its home matches at the army drill-field known as Kleiner Exerzierplatz in Westend, Malwitzstraße, and wore uniforms made up of dark green jerseys and white shorts.

After a brief turn in the VBB (Verband Berliner Ballspielvereine or Federation of Berlin Ballplay Teams) the club turned exclusively to varsity competition in 1902 and organized the first varsity football championship in the city in 1903. They met Preussen Berlin in the final, defeating them by a score of 2:1. Akademischer SC and Britannia Berlin also took part in the competition.

The team's best-known footballer was Strasbourg's Ivo Schricker, who played for the club while studying law in Berlin and went on to be Secretary General of FIFA from 1932 to 1950.

In addition to its football side the club had departments for athletics, speed skating, and tennis. The club was also one of the pioneers of ice hockey in Berlin. At the first ice hockey game played in Germany on February 4, 1897, on Lake Halensee, they faced a mixed Berlin team, winning the game 11:4.
