= Wojciech Niemiec =

Polish footballer (1956–2021)

Personal information
- Date of birth: 21 October 1956
- Place of birth: Przemyśl, Poland
- Date of death: 28 December 2021 (aged 65)
- Height: 1.81 m (5 ft 11 in)
- Position: Defender

Senior career*
| Years | Team | Apps | (Gls) |
| 1971–1973 | Polonia Przemyśl | | |
| 1973–1976 | Stal Mielec | 2 | (0) |
| 1976–1977 | Legia Warsaw | 0 | (0) |
| 1977–1978 | Zawisza Bydgoszcz | 7 | (0) |
| 1978 | Goplania Inowrocław | | |
| 1978 | Stal Mielec | 0 | (0) |
| 1979–1990 | Stal Stalowa Wola | | |
| 1993–1994 | Polonia Hamburg | | |
- * Club domestic league appearances and goals

Wojciech Niemiec (21 October 1956 – 28 December 2021) was a Polish footballer who played as a defender.

== Club career ==
He started his career in Polonia Przemyśl, then he moved to Stal Mielec where he won the Polish championship in 1976. In the 1976–77 season, he played for Legia Warsaw, making one appearance and scoring in a League Cup fixture against Stal Mielec. Later, he played for Zawisza Bydgoszcz for a season, and for the last 11 years of his career, for Stal Stalowa Wola. From 1993 to 1994, he was still playing for the Polish diaspora in Hamburg.

== Personal life and death ==
Niemiec was born in Przemyśl, Poland. He died on 28 December 2021, at the age of 65.

== Honours ==
Stal Mielec

- Ekstraklasa: 1975–76
