= PSK =

PSK may refer to:

== Businesses and organisations ==
- Österreichische Postsparkasse (PSK), a former postal savings bank in Austria
- Phi Sigma Kappa, a men's social and academic fraternity in North America
- Post Südstadt Karlsruhe, a German sports club
- Revolutionary Party of Kurdistan (Partiya Şoreşa Kurdistan, PŞK), an illegal political party active in Turkey

== Science and technology ==
- Phase-shift keying, a digital modulation process
- Polysaccharide-K, a protein-bound polysaccharide
- Pre-shared key, a shared secret in cryptography

== Other uses ==
- "P.S.K. What Does It Mean?", a 1985 song by Schoolly D
- P. S. K. Paha (fl. 1978), Ghanaian footballer and manager
