= Mekhi Gray =

German footballer (born 2007)

Personal information
- Full name: Mekhi Anthony Gray
- Date of birth: 19 February 2007 (age 19)
- Place of birth: Kingston, Jamaica
- Height: 1.97 m (6 ft 6 in)
- Position: Forward

Team information
- Current team: Union Berlin
- Number: 32

Youth career
- –2019: Weißenseer FC
- 2019–2021: Berliner FC Dynamo
- 2021–: 1. FC Union Berlin

Senior career*
Years	Team	Apps	(Gls)
2026–	Union Berlin	3	(0)
- * Club domestic league appearances and goals as of 24 October 2026

Mekhi Anthony Gray (born 19 February 2007) is a Jamaican professional footballer who plays as a forward for Bundesliga club Union Berlin.

== Early life ==
Gray was born on 19 February 2007 and has a younger brother. Born in Kingston, Jamaica, he obtained German citizenship and Jamaican citizenship.

Growing up, he regarded France international Paul Pogba as his football idol.

== Career ==
As a youth player, Gray joined the youth academy of Weißenseer FC. Following his stint there, he joined the youth academy of Berliner FC Dynamo in 2019.

Ahead of the 2021–22 season, he joined the youth academy of Bundesliga side Union Berlin and was promoted to the club's senior team in 2026. On 10 October 2026, he debuted for them during a 1–0 home win over SV Elversberg in the league.

== Style of play ==
Gray plays as a forward. Right-footed, he is known for his strength.

== Career statistics ==
As of match played 24 October 2026

Appearances and goals by club, season and competition
Club	Season	League			Cup		Europe		Other		Total	
Club	Season	Division	Apps	Goals	Apps	Goals	Apps	Goals	Apps	Goals	Apps	Goals
Union Berlin	2026–27	Bundesliga	3	0	0	0	—		—		3	0
Career total			3	0	0	0	0	0	0	0	3	0
