= Nordring Berlin =

German football club

- Full name: SG Nordring Berlin 1949 e.V.
- Founded: 1893, 1949
- League: Kreisliga CBerlin (XI)
- 2015–16: Kreisliga B Berlin Staffel 4 (X), 15th (relegated)
Home colours	Away colours

SG Nordring Berlin is a German association football club based in the capital city of Berlin. The club traces its roots back to 22 November 1893 with the establishment of Berliner Fussball Club vom Jahre 1893. BFC 93 became one of the founding clubs of the DFB (Deutscher Fussball Bund, en:German Football Association) at Leipzig in 1900. They played top flight city football in the Märkischer Fussball Bund from 1904 to 1907 before slipping to lower-tier competition.

== History ==
In 1918, the club merged with Berliner Normannia 08 to form Berliner Sportvereinigung Normannia vom Jahre 1893. The union was brief, however, and was undone the following year. In 1933, BFC 93 found a new partner in Berliner Sport Club Eintracht-Borussia 01, which was itself the product of a 1911 merger between Berliner Sport Club Borussia 02 and Berliner Sport Club Eintracht 01. The team then played as BSC Eintract-Borussia vom Jahre 1893 Berlin until the end of World War II when, like most other organizations in the country including sports and football clubs, it was dissolved by occupying Allied authorities.

New clubs were formed soon after the war and the former membership of SC became part of Sportgruppe Nordring in 1945. SGN joined East German competition and took part in just a single season of top flight postwar play. The team briefly resumed its postwar identity in 1948 before being re-organized as Sportgemeinschaft Nordring the following year. They enjoyed some minor success over the years at the local level. The first and second teams won division titles in 1958, and the first team made appearances in two district cup finals. The club narrowly missed promotion in 1984 on goal difference and then went through a difficult period as it struggled financially.

Following German reunification in 1990 the club was known as SG Nordring 1949. The team currently plays in Berlin's Kreisliga B (X).
