= SC Naumburg =

German football club

Naumburg SC was a German association football club that played in Naumburg, Saxony-Anhalt. The club was founded 29 September 1899 and was the first formed in the city. Part of the Verband Mitteldeutscher Ballspiel-Vereine (VMBV), Naumburg played their home matches at the Vogelwiese ("bird meadow") wearing the team colours of black and white.

Naumburg SC is notable only as a founding member of the German Football Association (Deutscher Fussball Bund or German Football Association) at Leipzig in 1900 as it disappeared from the German football scene early on when the club was dissolved in 1908.

In 2016 the local traditional clubs Naumburger SV 1905 and Naumburger BC 1920 decided to merge per 1 July 2017 and use the name SC Naumburg for the resulting new club.

== Literature ==
- DFB (Publisher): "Deutsches Fußball-Jahrbuch, Band 1904/05". Verlag Grethlein und Co., Leipzig 1905.
