= Berliner FC Burgund =

German association football club

- Full name: Berliner Fußball Club Burgund
- Short name: BFC Burgund
- Founded: 1896
- Dissolved: 1903

Berliner Fußball Club Burgund was a German association football club from the city of Berlin.

The short-lived club was established in 1896 and was active through the end of the century to 1903. The membership joined with the footballers of Berliner Fußball Club Phönix to establish Berliner Fußball Club Deutschland on 25 March 1903. BFC Burgund is notable as a founding member of the DFB (Deutscher Fussball Bund or German Football Association) at Leipzig in 1900.

A second club using the name Burgund was established in 1910 and was equally short-lived.
