= FC Bavaria 1899 München =

German football club

FC Bavaria München was a short-lived German association football club from Munich, Bavaria. Alongside FC Nordstern 1896 München and 1. Münchner FC 1896, Bavaria was notable as one of the founding members of the German Football Association (Deutscher Fußball Bund) at Leipzig in 1900.

Established on 1 November 1899, in addition to its football side, the association had departments for athletics, croquet, and ladies' hockey. Bavaria was an independent side until 1907 when they joined the gymnastics club Turngemeinde Munich AV.

The footballers of Bavaria played at the Sportplatz Loco-Kaiserstraße in a kit of blue-and-white jerseys and black shorts.
