= KSV Simson Bremen =

German football club

KSV Simson Bremen was a German association football club based in the Hanseatic city of Bremen. The team was part of the Verband Bremer Ballspiel Vereine and was a founding member of the DFB (Deutscher Fußball Bund, en:German Football Association) at Leipzig in 1900. The club played a single season in the VBBV before withdrawing from competition.
