= FC Concordia Wilhelmsruh =

German football club

- Full name: FC Concordia Wilhelmsruh 1895 e.V.
- Founded: 29 June 1895
- Ground: Nordendarena
- Capacity: 3,000
- League: Kreisliga A Berlin Staffel 2 (IX)
- 2018–19: 5th
| Home colours | Away colours |

FC Concordia Wilhelmsruh is a German football club based in Berlin. The club was founded on 29 June 1895 as Concordia Berlin and was one of the founding members of the German Football Association in Leipzig in 1900. It is named after Concordia, the Roman goddess of unity.

== History ==
In its early years the club moved between first and second division level play on the local city circuit and captured its first honors with a second division title in 1901. That advanced the club to the Oberliga Berlin where they played a single season before becoming part of the Berliner Meisterschaft, a competing first tier circuit. They returned to Oberliga play in 1911. The team twice appeared in Berliner-Pokal (Berlin Cup) play, being put out by Weißenseer FC in a 1910 semifinal match, and in 1929, being thrashed 11–0 by Hertha BSC in a quarterfinal contest.

Concordia fell to amateur level play at the end of the 1911–12 campaign. They merged with an unnamed local side in 1924 to become Ballspiel-Club Concordia vom Jahre 1895. The team remained a lower-tier side until after World War II in 1945. In the aftermath of the war Allied occupation authorities banned all existing organizations in Germany, including sports and football clubs. Concordia was re-established as SG Wilhelmsruh and resumed play in the Amateurliga Berlin (II) in the 1947–48 season. The next year the club was renamed FC Concordia Wilhelmsruh and played two more seasons in the Amateurliga as a mid-table side.

The burgeoning Cold War that would divide the country into East and West Germany led to the formation of separate football leagues in the Soviet-occupied areas. Being based in what would become East Berlin, Concordia was ousted from the Amateurliga Berlin to play in the DDR-Liga (II) as SG Concordia Wilhelmsruh. They were immediately relegated to the Landesliga Berlin (III) after only a single season and a last place finish. The club then played third-tier football until the mid-1950s when it slipped deeper into the amateur ranks, making only occasional and fleeting appearances in the Bezirksliga Berlin through the 1970s and 1980s.

The club collapsed after German reunification and was re-established in May 1992. Today the team fields a total of eighteen teams and emphasizes its youth sides. The men's team (I) played in the Bezirksliga Berlin (VIII) until 2015 when a league championship took it up to the Landesliga. It came last in its Landesliga division in 2015–16 and was relegated once more. Concordia was relegated even lower next season to the Kreisliga (IX).
