= Helmut Jahn (footballer) =

German footballer (1917–1986)

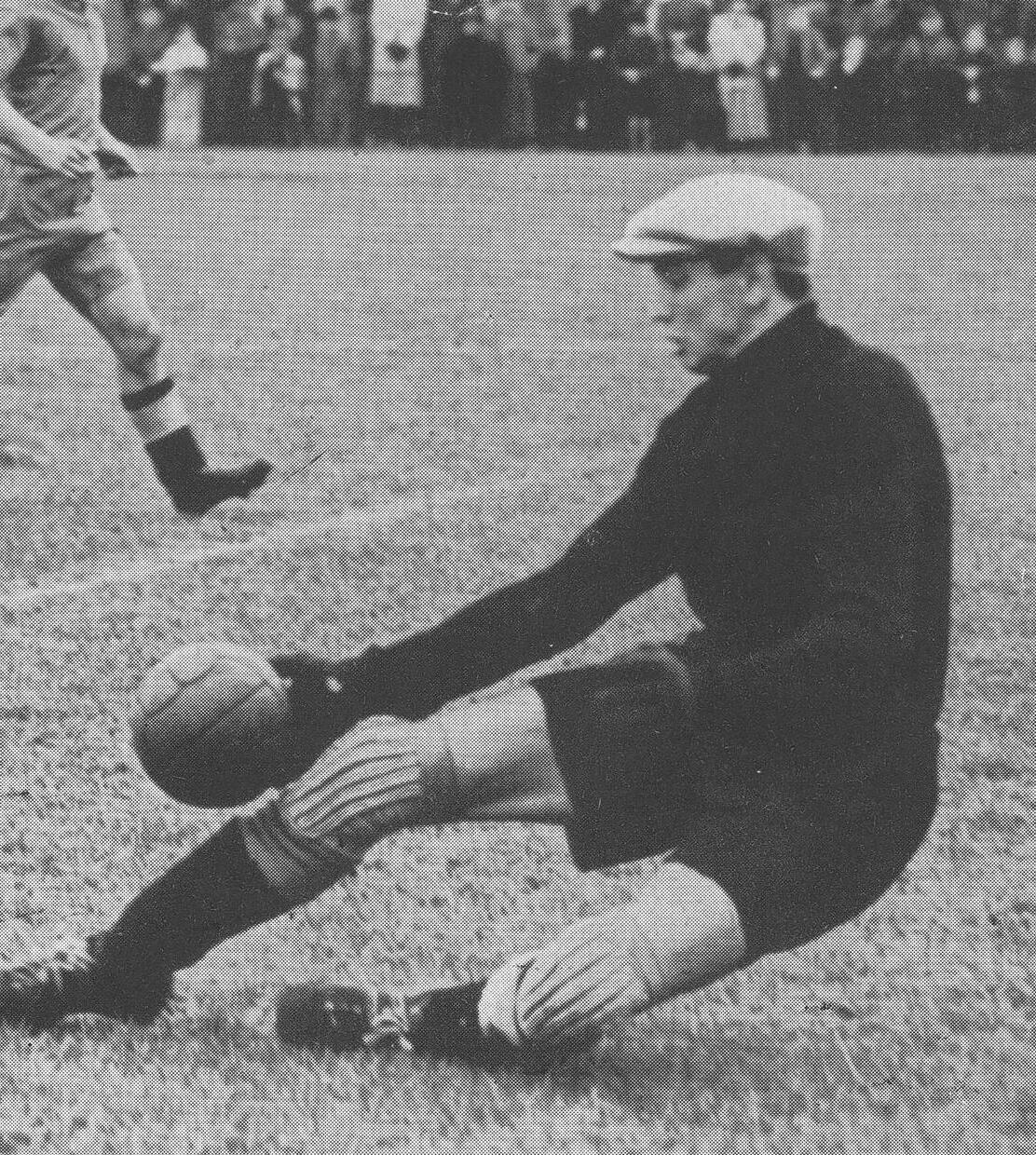
- Jahn in 1943

Personal information
- Date of birth: 22 October 1917
- Place of birth: Nuremberg, Germany
- Date of death: 18 March 1986 (aged 68)
- Place of death: Nuremberg, Germany
- Position: Goalkeeper

Youth career
- 1925–1934: Spandauer SV

Senior career*
Years	Team	Apps	(Gls)
1934–1935	Brandenburger 03 Berlin		
1935–1937	Hertha 06 Charlottenburg		
1937–1943	Berliner SV 1892		
1945	FC St. Pauli		
- VfB Stuttgart
–1948	Stuttgarter Kickers		
1948–1951	TuS Neuendorf		
1951–1953	VfB Koblenz-Lützel		

International career
1939–1942	Germany	17	(0)
- * Club domestic league appearances and goals

Helmut Jahn (22 October 1917 – 18 March 1986) was a German footballer who played as a goalkeeper. He made 17 appearances for the Germany national team between 1939 and 1942.
