= BFC Frankfurt =

German football club

- Full name: Berliner Fußball Club 1885 Frankfurt
- Founded: 1885
- Ground: Tempelhofer Feld
- Chairman: George Leux
- –: defunct
Home colours	Away colours

BFC Frankfurt Berlin was a German association football club that played in Berlin.

== History ==
Founded on 5 May 1885, the club's unusual name was taken from the hometown of founder and president George Leux. The Leux family was well known as sportsmen in Frankfurt, and George had come to Berlin in order to be better able to pursue his career as an artist. BFC Frankfurt regularly played with a white shirt with blue stripes and a blue and white-paneled cap.

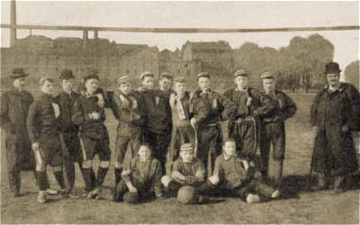
Team portrait of the country's first football club Berliner FC Frankfurt. George Leux is pictured at right.

Initially, the team played rugby, one of several English sports including association football and cricket becoming popular in continental Europe at the time, but by the end of the decade rugby had been given up for association football. Frankfurt played in several of Berlin's early football leagues and were city champions in the Allgemeiner Deutscher Sport Bund in 1898 after finishing second to BTuFC Britannia 1892 the year before. The first match known to be played between clubs from two different German cities saw BFCF defeat Bremer FC Teutonia 5–0 on 11 March 1894.

BFC Frankfurt folded after only a brief existence, with the club's members leaving to join Union 92 Berlin, which in turn became part of the current day club Blau-Weiß 90 Berlin. Nonetheless, BFC Frankfurt is recognized as one of the earliest football clubs formed in Germany – with some sources marking it as the country's first – and it was also one of the founding clubs of the German Football Association (Deutscher Fussball Bund or German Football Association) at Leipzig in 1900.

== Honours ==
- Allgemeinen Deutschen Sport Bundes champions: 1898
- Allgemeinen Deutschen Sport Bundes vice-champions: 1897
