= SC Germania 1899 Bremen =

German football club

Sportclub Germania Bremen was a German association football club based in the Hanseatic city of Bremen. Established in 1899, the club was one of several short-lived Bremen-based clubs that bore the name Germania around the turn of the century. The side played in the Verband Bremer Ballspiel Vereine and was a founding member of the DFB (Deutscher Fußball Bund, en:German Football Association) at Leipzig in 1900. The club soon disappeared from the German football scene.
