= Kurt Diemer =

German footballer

Personal information
- Date of birth: 17 May 1893
- Date of death: 13 December 1953 (aged 60)
- Position: Defender

Senior career*
Years	Team	Apps	(Gls)
- Britannia Berlin

International career
1912–1913	Germany	4	(0)
- * Club domestic league appearances and goals

Kurt Diemer (17 May 1893 – 13 December 1953) was a German international footballer.
