= Olympia Leipzig =

German association football club

SG Olympia Leipzig
- Founded: 1896
- League: Stadklasse Leipzig (IX)
- 2015–16: Stadtliga Leipzig (VIII), 16th (relegated)
Home colours	Away colours

SG Olympia Leipzig is a German association football club based in Leipzig, Saxony.

== History ==
The club was founded 10 June 1896 as FV Olympia and was a founding member of the German Football Association (German: Deutscher Fußball Bund) in Leipzig in 1900. In 1903, the club joined FC Lipsia, which had also been a founding member, to form Neuer Leipziger Ballspielverein Olympia which was shortened to Ballspielverein Olympia.

Logo of predecessor side BV Olympia Leipzig ca. 1930

Over the course of the rest of the century the football club would go through a number of mergers and name changes. They were briefly united in 1917 with Leipziger BC 1883 to form the wartime side SG LBC Olympia 1896 but re-emerged at the end of World War I in 1918 as BV Olympia. In 1926 they played as BSV Olympia-Germania until renamed VfL Olympia 96 in 1938.

After World War II Allied authorities ordered the dissolution of existing organizations in Germany, including sports and football clubs. In the fall of 1945 the creation of new clubs was allowed and the team was re-formed as ZSG Industrie-Mitte. Playing in the Soviet-occupied part of the country that eventually became East Germany, the club underwent frequent name changes and mergers as was common there. In quick succession the team was known as Fahrzeugbau Leipzig-Mitte (1947), BSG Gohlis-Süd (1948), and then BSG Lok Nord (1951). In 1961 they merged with BSG Motor Gohlis (not the similarly named Motor Gohlis-Nord) to become BSG Motor Nord.

After German reunification in 1990 the team was registered as SV Motor Leipzig-Nord e.V. before finally merging with VfL 1977 Leipzig in 1999 to become SG Olympia Leipzig. The club has been playing in local amateur football in recent times, competing in the tier nine Stadtklasse Leipzig until 2015, when it was promoted to the Stadtliga for a season, suffering instant relegation again.

== Lipsia ==
- FC Lipsia was founded in the "Zur Mühle" restaurant on 1 February 1893, making it the first club formed in Saxony. The club has since re-emerged to play today as SV Lipsia 93 Leipzig-Eutritzsch.
- Lipsia is the Latinized version of Leipzig.
