= Founding Clubs of the DFB =

The DFB (Deutscher Fußball-Bund or German Football Association) was formed 28 January 1900 in Leipzig, German Empire. The commonly accepted number of founding clubs represented at the inaugural meeting is 86, but this number is uncertain. The vote held to establish the association was 64–22 in favour (86 votes). Some delegates present represented more than one club, but may have voted only once. Other delegates present did not carry their club's authority to cast a ballot.

Founding associations are believed to include the following:

1. Altonaer FC von 1893
2. FC Eintracht Altona
3. Ascherslebener SC 1898
4. Akademischer BC 1897 Charlottenburg
5. Akademischer SC 1893 Berlin
6. BTuFC Alemannia 90
7. Berliner FC 1893
8. BTuFC Britannia 1892
9. BFC Burgund 1896 Berlin
10. BFC Concordia 1895 Berlin
11. BFuCC Deutschland Berlin
12. BSC Favorit 1896 Berlin
13. BFC Fortuna 1894 Berlin
14. BFC Frankfurt 1885 Berlin
15. Friedenau SC Excelsior Berlin
16. BFC Germania 1888 Berlin
17. BFC Hertha 1892 Berlin
18. BFC Columbia 1896 Berlin
19. Berliner Sport-Club Komet
20. BFC Phönix Berlin
21. BFC Preussen 1894 Berlin
22. BFuCC Rapide 1893 Berlin
23. BFC Stern 1889 Berlin
24. BFC Tasmania 1890 Berlin
25. BTuFC Toscana Berlin
26. BTuFC Union 1892 Berlin
27. BTuFC Viktoria 1889 Berlin
28. BFC Vorwärts 1890 Berlin
29. 1. Bockenheimer FC 1899
30. FC Brunsviga 1896 Braunschweig
31. FuCC Eintracht 1895 Braunschweig
32. FC Germania Braunschweig
33. ASC 1898 Bremen
34. Bremer SC 1891 (represented by Hamburg's Walter Sommermeier)
35. Club SuS 1896 Bremen
36. SC Germania 1899 Bremen
37. SC Hansa 1898 Bremen
38. KSV Simson Bremen
39. FV Werder 1899 Bremen (represented by Hamburg's Walter Sommermeier)
40. SV Blitz 1897 Breslau
41. Britannia Chemnitz
42. Dresdner FC 1893
43. Dresdner SC 1898
44. SC Erfurt 1895
45. FC Frankfurt 1880
46. Frankfurter FC 1899
47. Frankfurter FC Germania 1894
48. Frankfurter FC Viktoria 1899
49. Freiburger FC 1897
50. Hamburger FC 1888
51. SC Germania 1887 zu Hamburg
52. FC Hammonia 1896 Hamburg
53. FC St. Georg 1895 Hamburg
54. FC Victoria 1895 Hamburg
55. FC Association 1893 Hamburg
56. 1. Hanauer FC 1893
57. Hanauer FG 1899
58. FC Viktoria 1894 Hanau
59. Deutscher FV 1878 Hannover
60. Karlsruher FV 1891
61. Phönix 1894 Karlsruhe
62. Karlsruher FC Südstadt
63. Leipziger BC 1893
64. FC Lipsia 1893 Leipzig
65. FC Olympia 1896 Leipzig
66. VfB Sportbrüder 1893 Leipzig
67. FC Wacker 1895 Leipzig
68. FuCC Victoria 1896 Magdeburg
69. FuCC Cricket-Viktoria 1897 Magdeburg
70. Mannheimer FC Viktoria 1897
71. Mannheimer FG 1896
72. Mannheimer FG Union 1897
73. Mannheimer FG Germania 1897
74. Mannheimer FV 1898
75. Mittweidaer BC
76. FC Germania 1899 Mühlhausen
77. FC Bavaria 1899 München
78. 1. Münchner FC 1896
79. FC Nordstern 1896 München
80. SC Naumburg
81. VfB 1893 Pankow
82. 1. FC 1896 Pforzheim
83. Pforzheimer FC Frankonia
84. Deutscher FC 1892 Prag
85. Deutscher FC Germania 1898 Prag
86. Straßburger FV 1890
