= ASC 1898 Bremen =

German football club

ASC Bremen or Allgemeinen Bremer Sportclub von 1898 was a German association football club based in the Hanseatic city of Bremen. Founded in 1898, the club played briefly (1900–1902) in the Verband Bremer Ballspiel Vereine (Federation of Bremen Ballsport Clubs) fielding both first and second division sides. ASC is recognized as one of the founding clubs of the DFB (Deutscher Fussball Bund or German Football Association) in Leipzig in 1900.

This club had only a short existence and disappeared early on from the German football scene. It is not related to the similarly named clubs, ASC 1994 Bremen Firebirds, which plays American football, or with Auto Sport-Club Bremen.

== Team trivia ==
- FV Werder, predecessor of modern-day Bundesliga side Werder Bremen, played its first ever match on 10 September 1899 against ASC, coming away with a 1–0 victory.
