= Ascherslebener SC 1898 =

German association football club

Ascherslebener SC
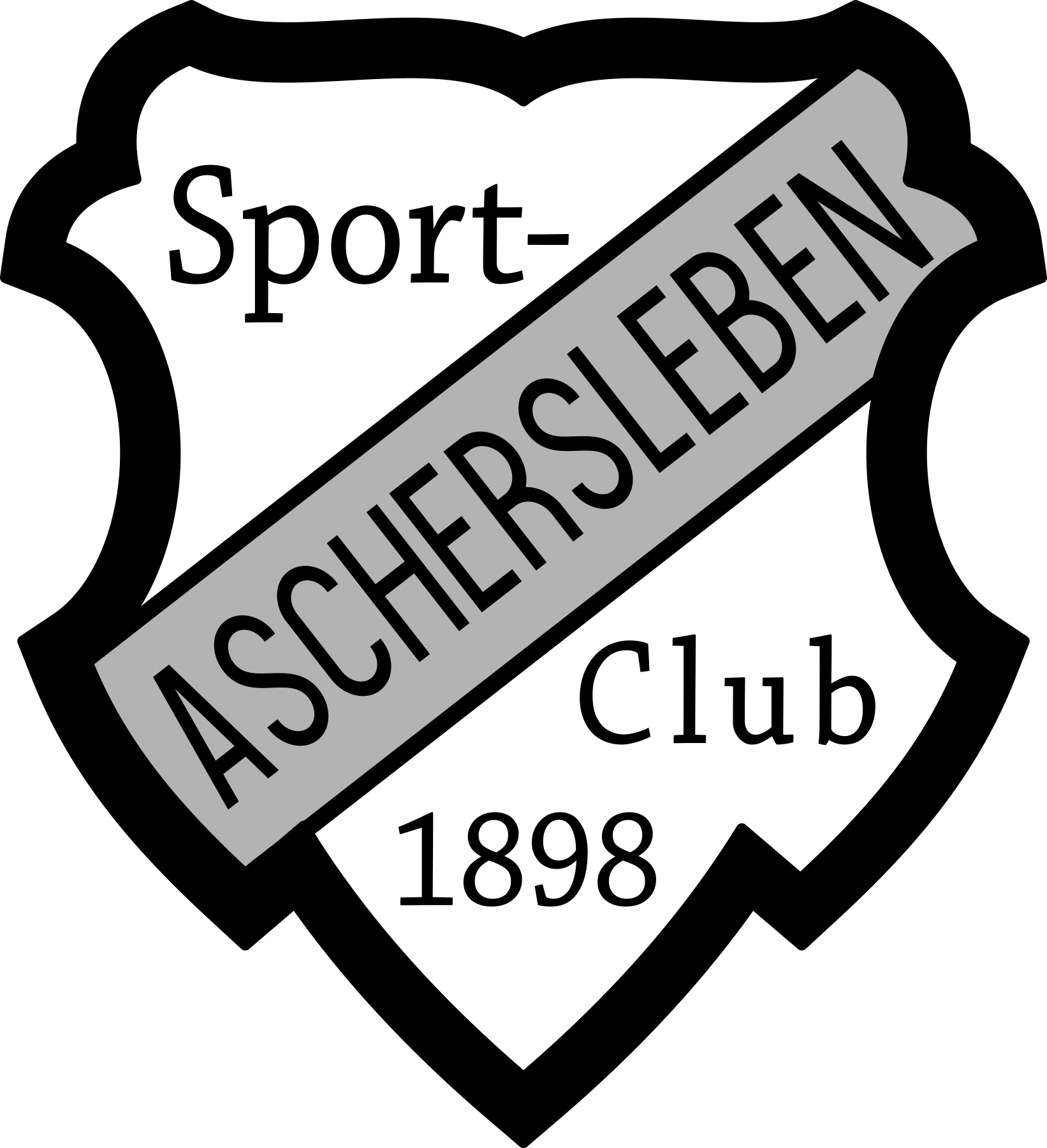
- Full name: Ascherslebener Sport Club 1898
- Founded: 1898
- Dissolved: 19??
- defunct
Home colours	Away colours

The Ascherslebener Sport Club 1898 was a short-lived German association football club in the town of Aschersleben, Saxony-Anhalt. Established in 1898, little is known about the club and it is notable only as one of the founding members of the DFB (Deutscher Fussball Bund or German Football Association) at Leipzig on January 28, 1900. It was represented by Gustav Oehmichen at the foundation meeting.

In addition to fielding a football side, the sports club had a cycling department and was a member of an early national cycling association, the Deutschen Radfaher Bundes.

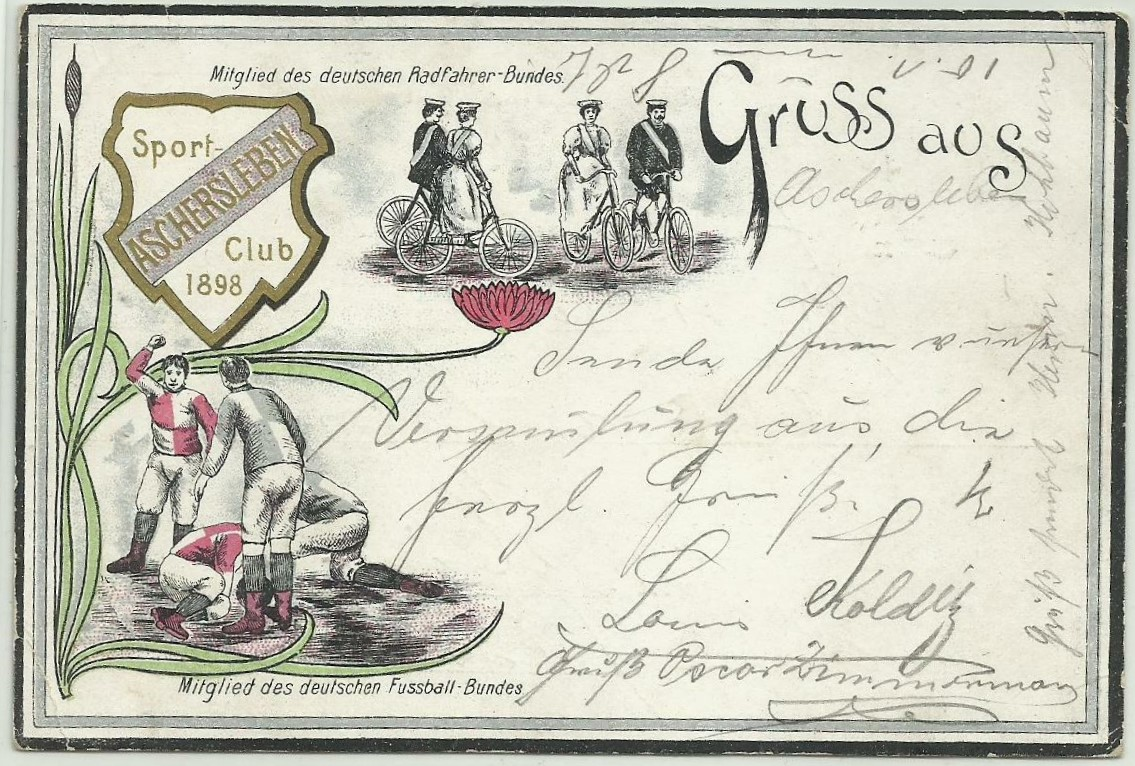
