= FC Nordstern 1896 München =

German association football club

FC Nordstern 1896 München was a short-lived German association football club in Munich, Bavaria. Both Nordstern and 1. Münchner FC 1896 laid claim to being the oldest football clubs in the city. Alongside FC Bavaria 1899 München, these clubs were notable as founding members of the German Football Association (Deutscher Fußball Bund) at Leipzig in 1900.

Established by students in 1896 out of the sports club Terra Pila, their only known recorded match was a lopsided 0:15 loss to newly formed Bayern Munich on 15 April 1900 played as part of a citywide championship. Nordstern folded in February 1902.
