= 1. Münchner FC 1896 =

German association football club

1. Münchner FC 1896 was a German association football club in Munich, Bavaria whose origins were in the formation on 5 September 1896 of the club Terra Pila (Latin: earth + ball) by a group of students playing football on the city's Theresienwiese, which is today the official ground of the Munich Oktoberfest. Both 1. FC and FC Nordstern München laid claim to being the earliest football club in the city and were made up primarily of students. Alongside FC Bavaria 1899 München, these clubs are notable as founding members of the German Football Association (Deutscher Fußball Bund or German Football Association) at Leipzig in 1900.

1. FC was split in two in 1898 when a number of members whose enthusiasm was for climbing left to form the Bergaffen or Mountain Monkeys. The footballers of Terra Pila carried on, with some leaving to become part of the football department of TV München 1860 while others formed 1. Münchner Fußball-Club von 1896 in 1899. This team provided the opposition in the first ever match played by FC Bayern Munich in March 1900, who won the game 5:2.

1. FC continued to play in local and regional football competition until 1910 when for some reason not explained in the club chronicle they abandoned the game. However, the association remained active until 1960 as a bowling club.

A later, unrelated club was formed in 1933 out of the merger of Deutscher SV München and FC Teutonia München to play as 1. FC München in the Gauliga Bayern. The union was short-lived and ended in 1936.
