= Mannheimer FG Germania 1897 =

German football club

Mannheimer Fußballgesellschaft Germania was an early German association football club, founded in 1897 in the city of Mannheim, Baden-Württemberg.

FG was one of five founding members of the Mannheimer Fußball-Bund established in 1899. The club went on to also become a founding member of the DFB (Deutscher Fußball Bund or German Football Association) at Leipzig in 1900.

== Literature ==
- DFB (Hrsg.): Deutsches Fußball-Jahrbuch, Band 1904. Verlag Grethlein und Co., Leipzig 1904.
