= FC Brunsviga 1896 Braunschweig =

German association football club

FC Brunsviga Braunschweig
- Full name: Fußball-Club Brunsviga 1896 Braunschweig
- Founded: 1896
- League: defunct
| Home colours | Away colours |

FC Brunsviga Braunschweig was a German association football club from the city of Braunschweig, Lower Saxony. The short-lived club was founded in 1896 by students of the local teacher's college and was disbanded sometime in 1901. It is notable as one of the founding members of the German Football Association (Deutscher Fußball Bund or German Football Association) at Leipzig on 28 January 1900.

Throughout its brief existence Brunsviga was a rival to the city's earliest football club, Eintracht Braunschweig. They lost their first match against the senior side 0:12 on 13 February 1898 with the last recorded meeting between the two clubs on 15 April 1900 ending in a 7:2 victory for Eintracht.

Brunsviga limited themselves to recruiting local players, while the more ambitious Eintracht club recruited from across the country and often took on Brunsviga players. Following the disbanding of Brunsviga many of the former members subsequently moved on to join Eintracht.
