= Akademischer SC 1893 Berlin =

German football club

Akademischer SC Berlin
- Full name: Akademischer Sport-Club 1893 Berlin
- Founded: 18 November 1893
- Ground: Sportpark Friedenau
- –: defunct
Home colours	Away colours

Akademischer Sport-Club 1893 Berlin was a German association football club based in Berlin and is notable as one of the founding clubs of the German Football Association (Deutscher Fussball Bund) in Leipzig in 1900.

Founded on 18 November 1893, Akademischer SC played its best football between 1897 and 1902 out of the Sportpark Friedenau as part of the VBB (Verband Berliner Ballspielvereine or Federation of Berlin Ballplay Teams). After this the club, which is believed to have been made up largely of students from Berlin University, participated in varsity league competition. They took part in national varsity championship in 1911 where they dropped a 1–11 decision to Tennis Borussia Berlin

A dispute within the club membership led to the formation of a separate, similarly named side, known as Akademischer Ballspiel Club Charlottenburg in 1897.

In addition to its football side the club had departments for athletics, field hockey, ice hockey, and tennis, as well as a group playing an unusual variation of polo using bicycles.
