= Fritz Baumgarten =

German footballer

Fitz Baumgarten
Personal information
- Date of birth: 21 December 1886
- Date of death: 17 May 1961 (aged 74)
- Position: Goalkeeper

Senior career*
Years	Team	Apps	(Gls)
- BFC Germania

International career
1908	Germany	1	
- * Club domestic league appearances and goals

Fritz Baumgarten (21 December 1886 – 17 May 1961) was a German footballer.

He played as a goalkeeper for the Berlin club BFC Germania. On 5 April 1908, in Basel, Switzerland Baumgarten was part of the national side in Germany's first ever international match which they lost 5–3 to the Swiss. This was his only appearance for the national team.
