= BFuCC Deutschland Berlin =

German football club

Home colours	Away colours

BFuCC Deutschland Berlin was an early German association football club from the city of Berlin. The club is notable as one of the founding clubs of the German Football Association (Deutscher Fussball Bund, en:German Football Association) at Leipzig in 1900. The club's full name was Berliner Fußball -und Cricket Club Deutschland and, like many other clubs of the era built around enthusiasm for the new English sports of football, rugby, and cricket, Deutschland also fielded a cricket side.

Through most of the 1890s there were several competing football circuits in the city of Berlin. Little is known of Deutschland Berlin beyond its appearance in second- and third-tier play of the Verband Brandenburger Ballspiel, which in 1902 became successor to the Verband Deutscher Ballspiel established in 1896. Known to be active through the first decade of the 1900s, the team only rarely enjoyed a winning season.
