= FT Cottbus 93 =

German association football club

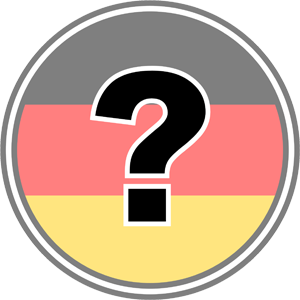
- Full name: Freie Turnerschaft Cottbus 93
- Founded: 1893
- Dissolved: 1933
- Ground: Gaglower Weg
Home colours	Away colours

FT Cottbus 93 was a German association football club from the city of Cottbus, Brandenburg. The team was formed sometime in 1913 as a department within the gymnastics and sports club of the same name. FT was part of the Arbeiter-Turn- und Sportbund (ATSB or Workers' Gymnastics and Sports Federation) a national German sports organization active between 1893 and 1933. The ATSB actively promoted leftist political views built around class struggle and nationalism. The Nazi regime regarded worker's and faith-based clubs as politically undesirable and this led to the disbanding of the club in 1933.

In 1923, Cottbus won the district championship for the first time and repeated that success in 1924 and 1927. They reached the ATSB district final for the first time in 1928, but failed to advance to the national playoffs after losing 3:8 to TuS Süd Forst. They earned additional district titles in 1929, 1931, and 1932.

FT qualified for the German ATSB Championship in 1932 and defeated FFV Ponarth (5:2), Eintracht Reinickendorf-West (4:3), and VfK Südwest Leipzig (4:3) on their way to the national final where they were beaten by TSV Nürnberg-Ost (4:1). A year later, the team again captured the district championship, but lost to SV Sturm Marga in qualifying for the national playoffs before the ATSB was dismantled by the Nazis.
