= Berliner Fussball Club vom Jahre 1893 =

German football club

BFC vom Jahre 1893 Berlin
- Full name: Berliner Fußball-Club vom Jahre 1893 e.V.
- Founded: 1893
- Dissolved: 1933
| Home colours | Away colours |

Berliner Fußball-Club vom Jahre 1893 was a German association football club from the city of Berlin. The club is notable as one of the founding clubs of the German Football Association (Deutscher Fussball Bund, en:German Football Association) at Leipzig in 1900. It was one of the predecessors of current day club Nordring Berlin.

== History ==
Established 22 November 1893, BFC 93 played top flight city football in the Märkischer Fußball-Bund from 1904 to 1907. Their best result was a 4th-place finish in 1905 before they slipped to lower-tier competition after finishing 9th in 1907. The club's home field was at Lübarser Straße Wittenau. In 1918 they merged with Berliner Normannia 08 to play as Berliner Sportvereinigung Normannia vom 1893 in a short lived union that ended in 1919.

In 1933, the team joined Berliner Eintracht-Borussia 01 – which was the product of the 1911 union of Berliner Sportclub Borussia 02 and Berliner Sport Club Eintracht 01 – to play as Berliner SC Eintracht-Borussia vom Jahre 1893.

Following World War II, occupying Allied authorities ordered the dissolution of most organizations across the country, including sports and football clubs, as part of the process of de-Nazification. The membership of 93 became part of the community sports club Sportgruppe Nordring in 1945 and played in the Landesliga Berlin, Nordost, Staffel B where they finished 7th. In 1948 the club briefly re-adopted its prewar name, before becoming Sportgemeinschaft Nordring the following season. Between 1949 and the reunification of Germany in 1990 the team was part of the separate football competition that emerged in Soviet-occupied East Germany. In 1990, the club adopted the name SG Nording 49.
