= Mannheimer FV 1898 =

German football club

Mannheimer Fußballverein was an early German association football club, founded in 1898 in the city of Mannheim, Baden-Württemberg.

FV was one of five founding members of the Mannheimer Fußball-Bund established in 1899. The club went on to also become a founding member of the DFB (Deutscher Fußball Bund or German Football Association) at Leipzig in 1900.
