= BTuFC Toscana Berlin =

German football club

Home colours	Away colours

BTuFC Toscana Berlin was an early German association football club from the city of Berlin. The club is notable as one of the founding clubs of the German Football Association (Deutscher Fussball Bund, en:German Football Association) at Leipzig in 1900.

== History ==
Through most of the 1890s there were several competing football circuits in the city of Berlin. Little is known of Toscana beyond its occasional appearances in the Deutscher Fussball- und Cricket Bund, which was active from late 1891 through to 1901. The team earned a third-place result in second division play there in 1896, and then played a partial season in the league's first division in 1898, followed by another campaign there in 1900.

The club's full name was Berliner Thorball -und Fußball Club Toscana and, like many other clubs of the era built around enthusiasm for the new English sports of football, rugby, and cricket, Toscana also fielded a cricket side. The term thorball was used at the time as the German language equivalent for cricket, while Toscana or Toskana is German for the Italian region of Tuscany.
