= SC Germania Hamburg =

German sports club

Sport-Club Germania Hamburg
- Founded: 29 September 1887; 138 years ago
- Dissolved: 1919; 107 years ago

Sport-Club Germania Hamburg - often referred to as SC Germania 1887 - was a sports club from the northern German metropolis Hamburg. It was created on 29 September 1887 through the merger of the track and field clubs Hohenfelder Sportclub and Wandsbek-Marienthaler Sportclub, which both were founded in 1884. Germania was six times winner of the association football Championship of Hamburg and in 1900 a founding member of the German football association. Germania merged on 2 June 1919 with Hamburger SV von 1888, Northern German champions of that year, to form today's Hamburger SV, six times German champions and European Cup of Champions' winner of 1983. Hamburger SV carries the foundation date of Germania as its foundation date and uses the colours of Germania in its badge.

Hans Nobiling, a player of Germania, emigrated in the late 19th century to Brazil where he was in 1899 instrumental in founding two of the four oldest football clubs of the country, SC Internacional (SP) which became in 1938 part of São Paulo FC, three times world cup winner, and SC Germánia of São Paulo, which today as EC Pinheiros is considered as one of the biggest general sports clubs of the southern hemisphere. Internacional and Germánia won a total of four State Championships of São Paulo.

== History ==
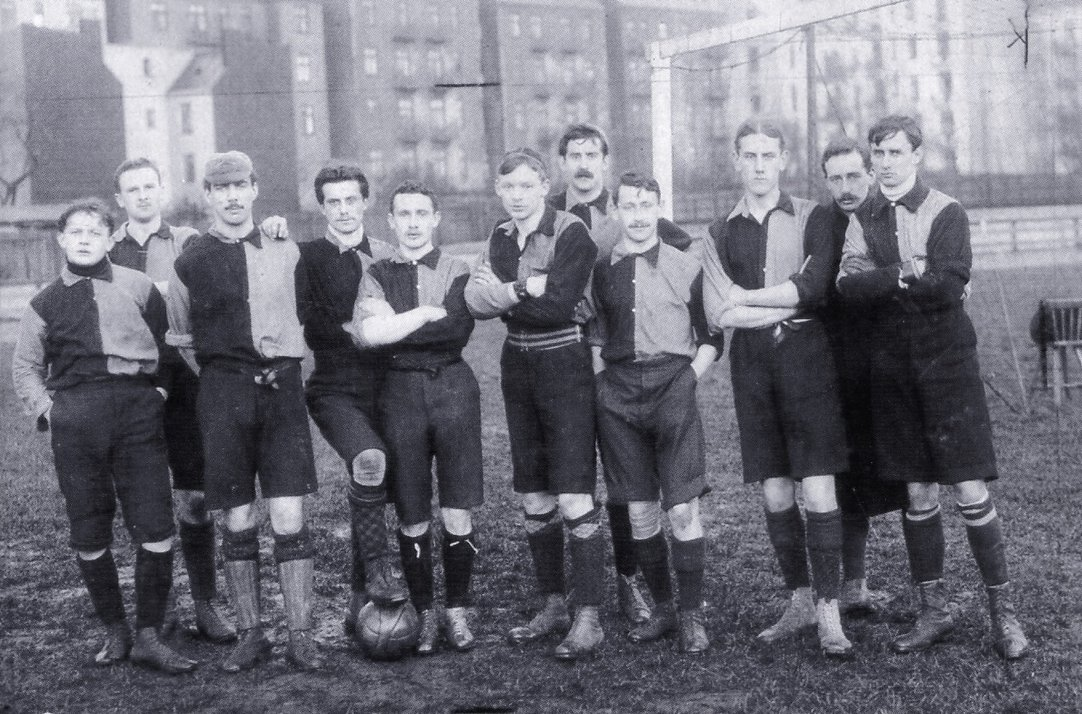
SC Germania ca. 1904

In the beginning the newly formed SC Germania remained focused on track and field and reportedly achieved some notoriety. In 1891, after a number of expatriate Englishmen joined the club, Germania incorporated the increasingly fashionable sport of association football in its activities. Germania was soon in a position to field two teams. The first ground in that era was a meadow, rented from a farmer in Wandsbek, just out of town. An outbreak of cholera in Hamburg in 1892, occasioning about 8,000 fatalities, led to a temporary shutdown of activities.

On 20 October 1894 the Hamburg-Altonaer Fußball-Bund, the "Football Association of Hamburg and Altona" - Altona was a Prussian city, immediately to the west of Hamburg, that like Wandsbek would be merged with Hamburg in 1937 - was founded and as the third German football association outside the imperial capital Berlin after the short-lived south-west German Süd-Westdeutsche Fußball-Union. The team of SC Germania, dominated by foreigners, mostly Britons, secured itself in 1896 and 1897 the first two championships of the association - undefeated on both occasions. In that period the Heiligengeistfeld and the Exerzierweide in Altona, the latter was also venue of the first national German championship final in 1903, found use as homegrounds.

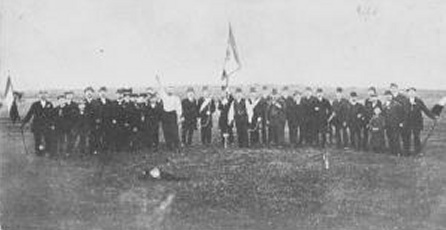
Exerzierweide

SC Germania, like Hamburger FC 1888 were amongst the 86 clubs who founded on 28 January 1900 the national German football association Deutscher Fussball-Bund. Both, like all clubs, from the Hamburg-Altona association and Bremen, were represented at the assembly in Leipzig by Walter Sommermeier.

Three more championship titles followed in 1901, 1902 and 1904. The championship of 1904 led to a participation in the play-offs for the second national championships. In the first round Germania defeated Hannover 96 11–1, however, in the second round, the semi-final, Germania lost at home 1–3 to TuFC Britannia Berlin.

In 1903 the Rennbahn Mühlenkamp, a harness racing course, became Germania's new home, the first enclosed football venue in town. 1907 Forsthof in Wandsbek had to replace it, as the racecourse was to be built up.

The northern German associations joined to form the Northern German Football Association, the Norddeutscher Fußball-Verband in 1905. In that period many players left Germania, which forthwith was in decline and eventually was relegated in 1912. After the outbreak of World War I Germania, like all other clubs, had a shortage of players and in order to be able to field teams entered into temporary associations with SV Uhlenhorst-Hertha and SC Concordia.

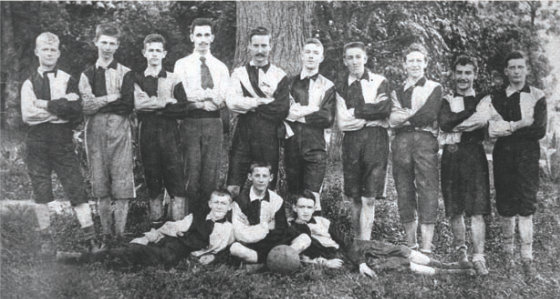
SC Germânia of São Paulo with Hans Nobiling wearing a tie. The kits are identical with Germania Hamburg

After the end of the war the club could not revive its fortunes and merged on 2 June 1919 with Hamburger SV von 1888, Northern German champions of that year, to form today's Hamburger SV, seven times German champions and European Cup of Champions' winner of 1982. Hamburger SV carries 1887 as its official year of foundation. The club colours were the Hanseatic red and white in honour of the City of Hamburg, with the blue and black of the oldest of the founding clubs, Germania, being used on the team badge. It is through Germania that HSV can lay a claim to being the German football club tracing back the furthest.

=== Influence in Brazil ===
Also in Brazil Germania, albeit indirectly, had an impact. Hans Nobiling, a former player, emigrated 1897 to São Paulo in Brazil. Soon he founded a football team, which evolved by 19 August 1899 into SC Internacional of São Paulo, the third oldest football club of Brazil. Internacional won State Championships of São Paulo in 1907 and 1928. In 1938, after a merger with Antarctica FC became part of São Paulo FC, which went on to become one of the most successful football clubs in the world. Also in 1899, on 7 September, Nobiling founded SC Germânia of São Paulo, which was part of the first official football match in the history of Brasil and went on to win State Championships in 1906 and 1915. Later Gêrmania was renamed to EC Pinheiros, often considered the largest sports club of the southern hemisphere, and it is the club whose members have won the most Olympic medals for Brazil.

Hermann Friese was another athlete from Germania. He won a national track and field title and emigrated to Brazil a few years after Nobiling. There he joined Germânia and was considered the best footballer in his days and one of the leading referees of his era. He also represented Brazil in an international track and field meeting.
