= Berliner FC Phönix =

German football club

- Full name: Berliner Fußball Club Phönix
- Dissolved: 1903

Berliner Fußball Club Phönix was a German association football club from the city of Berlin.

The short-lived club was active through the late 1890s until 1903. The membership joined with the footballers of Berliner Fußball Club Burgund to establish Berliner Fußball Deutschland on 25 March 1903. BFC Phönix is notable as a founding member of the DFB (Deutscher Fussball Bund or German Football Association) at Leipzig in 1900.
