= SC Komet Berlin =

German football club

- Full name: Berliner Sport-Club 1899 Komet
- Founded: c. 1899; 126 years ago
- –: defunct
Home colours	Away colours

SC Komet Berlin was a German sports club from the city of Berlin.

Komet was active from the late 1890s through to the late 1930s with its athletics department and association football club figuring on the German sports scene.

In 1900 the club was a founding member of the German Football Association (Deutscher Fussball Bund or German Football Association) at Leipzig, but beyond this never played a prominent role in the sport. Komet also helped form the VBAV (Verband Berliner Athletik-Vereine or Berlin Federation of Athletic Teams) on 15 November 1904 with club member Otto Gronert serving as first chairperson. The club became the first in Germany to organize a women's athletic department that same year.

The sport of javelin throwing was introduced to Germany through a 1906 demonstration to the club by then world record holder Swedish athlete Eric Lemming, the developer of the modern technique of the sport.

A number of athletes from the sports club participated in the 1908 Olympic Games held in London, England with runner Arthur Hoffmann coming away with a silver medal as part of Germany's men's medley relay team, the country's best result in athletics at these games. Hoffmann was Germany's 100m champion at the time.

Komet was one of ten clubs that formed Berlin's first ice hockey league in 1910.

== Sources ==
- DFB (ed.): Deutsches Fußball-Jahrbuch. Band 1904. Grethlein und Co., Leipzig
- Steinmetz, Fritz, 1973: 75 Jahre Deutsche Leichtathletik-Meisterschaften (1898–1972). Bartels und Wernitz: Berlin ISBN 3-87039-956-2
