= Erich Goede =

German footballer

Personal information
- Date of birth: 24 May 1916
- Date of death: 13 May 1949 (aged 32)
- Position: Midfielder

Senior career*
Years	Team	Apps	(Gls)
- Berliner SV 1892

International career
1939	Germany	1	(0)
- * Club domestic league appearances and goals

Erich Goede (24 May 1916 – 13 May 1949) was a German international footballer.
