= SV Stern Britz 1889 =

German football club

- Full name: Sportverein Stern Britz 1889 e.V.
- Founded: 1889
- Ground: Stadion am Buckower Damm
- Capacity: 5,000
- Chairman: Frank Meusel
- Trainer: René Wendl
- League: Bezirksliga Berlin Staffel 2 (VIII)
- 2015–16: 5th

SV Stern Britz 1889 is a German football club from Britz, which is part of the city district of Neukölln in southcentral Berlin. Predecessor BFC Stern was one of the founding clubs of the German Football Association in 1900.

== History ==
=== Berliner Fußball-Club Stern vom Jahre 1889 ===
Predecessor side Stern was established in early 1889 as Berliner Fußball-Club Marbert and was renamed on 3 May 1889 to Berliner FC Stern 89. The club played a single season in the top-flight Oberliga Berlin in 1906–07 and was relegated after an 8th-place result. They took part in the Berliner Pokal (Berlin Cup) in 1926 and advanced to the quarterfinals where they were put out by BFC Vorwärts 90 Berlin (2:3). Stern remained a lower circuit team through to the end of World War II. Their achievements were modest with their highest advance being to the Bezirksliga Berlin in 1939.

Following the conflict, occupying Allied authorities banned organizations throughout the country, including sports and football clubs, as part of the process of de-Nazification. Stern re-emerged on 8 July 1950 as 1. FC Neukölln Stern. They earned promotion to the Amateurliga Berlin (III) in 1953 with their best result coming the following season when they finished in third place. Neukölln were relegated after the 1957–58 season after crashing to 15th place and disappeared into lower division competition.

=== SV Stern Britz 1889 ===
Stern merged with Spielvereinigung Britz Süd 1949 on 15 June 1973 making the transition from a football club to a more broadly based sports club called Sportverein Stern Britz 1889 that also included departments for dance, darts, and swimming. Today the association offers its members aerobics, cheerleading, dance, and American football while still fielding its traditional football side. Much of the football department's focus has turned to its youth teams.

The American football team was founded as an independent club known as the Berlin Thunderbirds in 1992 and joined SV the following year. By 2002 it had grown into Berlin's largest American football team with close to 300 members.
