= FC Association 1893 Hamburg =

German football club

- Full name: Fußball Club Association Hamburg
- Founded: 1893
- Dissolved: 1900
- League: Hamburger-Altonaer Fußball–Bund

Fußball Club Association Hamburg was a German football club established in 1893 in Hamburg. The team played as part of the Hamburger-Altonaer Fußball Bund between 1896 and 1900 and was a founding member of the DFB at Leipzig in 1900. The last recorded standing for the team is in 1900, when they withdrew from Hamburger-Altonaer Fußball–Bund.

== Season–by–season ==
Season	Tier	Division	Place
1895–1896	Regional	Hamburger-Altonaer Fußsball-Und Cricket Bund	T-2nd
1896–1897	Regional	Hamburger-Altonaer Fußsball-Und Cricket Bund	8th
1897–1898	Regional	Hamburger-Altonaer Fußsball-Bund	8th
1898–1899	Regional	Hamburger-Altonaer Fußsball-Bund	8th
1899–1900	Regional	Hamburger-Altonaer Fußsball-Bund	Withdrew
