= Eintracht 01 Berlin =

German football club

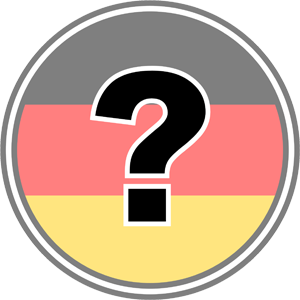
- Full name: Berliner Sport-Club Eintracht 1901
- Founded: 1901
Home colours	Away colours

Eintracht 01 Berlin was a German association football club from the city of Berlin. Established on 15 September 1901, Eintracht eventually became part of the tradition of present-day club Nordring Berlin. In the first decade of the 1900s the club played in the Märkische Meisterschaft, one of two competing top flight Berlin leagues, between 1905 and 1909. They earned only lower table results and were relegated after a 9th-place finish in 1909.

In 1911, they merged with Berliner Sportclub Borussia 02 to form Berliner SC Eintracht-Borussia 01. They were joined by SC Germania Weißensee the following year, and then by Berliner SC Fortuna in 1926. In 1933, they joined another former Märkische Meisterschaft club – Berliner Fussball Club vom Jahre 1893 – to create Berliner SC Eintracht-Borussia vom Jahre 1893. Throughout this period and through to the end of World War II the team played lower tier city football.

Following the conflict, occupying Allied authorities disbanded organizations throughout the country, including sports and football clubs. Late in 1945, the club was reestablished as Sportgruppe Nordring. They briefly took on their pre-war name in 1948, before becoming Sportgemeinschaft Nordring in 1949. Nordring was part of lower-tier football in the separate football competition that emerged in Soviet-occupied East Germany and following the reunification of the country in 1990 took on the name SG Nordring 1949.
