= BFC Fortuna 1894 Berlin =

German football club

Fortuna Berlin
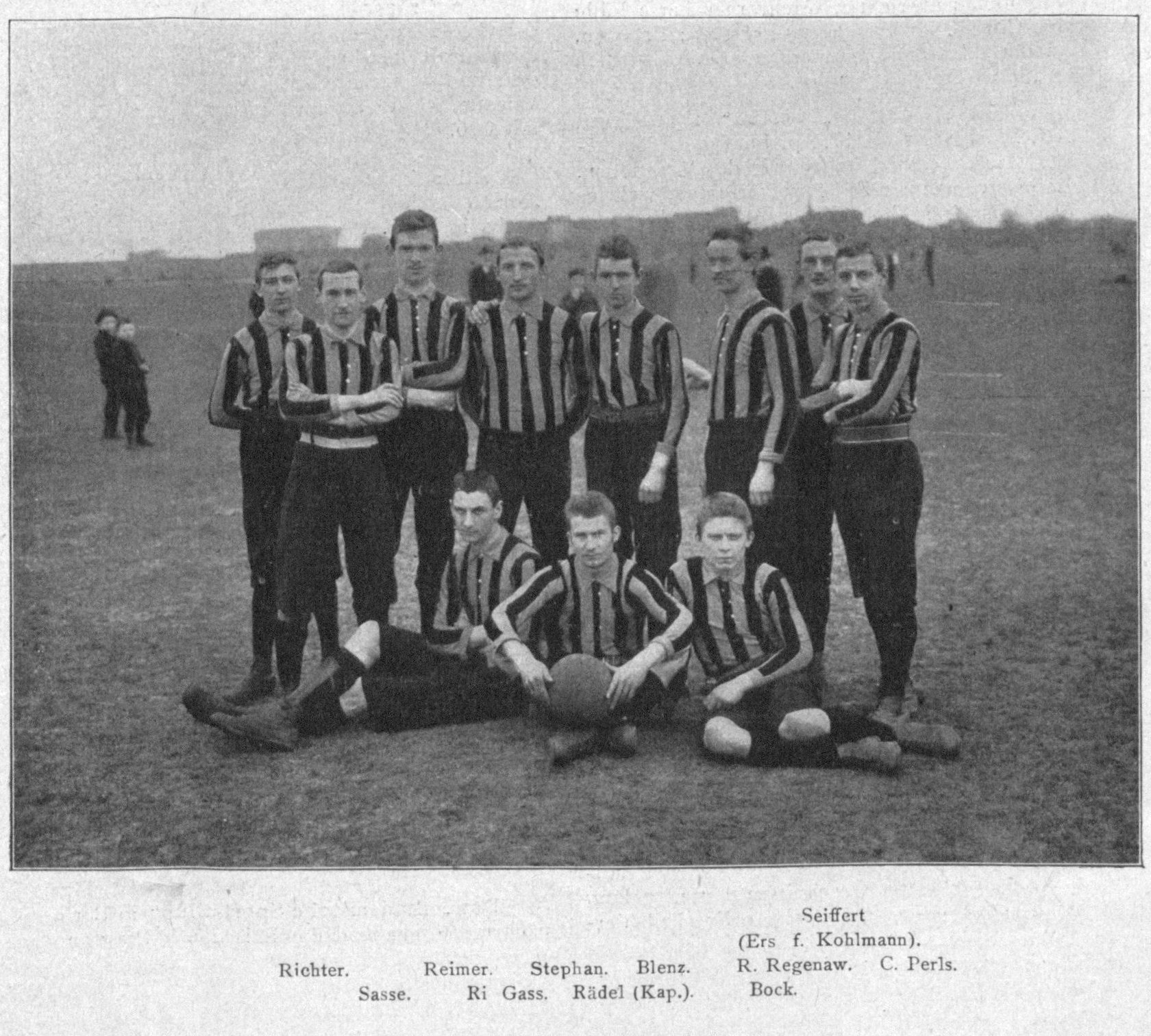
- BFC Fortuna in 1898
- Full name: Berliner Fußball Club Fortuna 1894 e.V.
- Founded: 1 November 1894
- Dissolved: 1914
- Ground: Tempelhofer Feld
Home colours	Away colours

Fortuna Berlin (Berliner Fussball Club Fortuna 1894 ) was a German association football club established on 1 November 1894 in Berlin out of the memberships of the clubs Semnonia Berlin and Berliner FC Hercynia. The short-lived side is notable as one of the founding clubs of the German Football Association (Deutscher Fussball Bund or German Football Association) in Leipzig in 1900. The club colours were black and blue and the footballers played in a kit of white shirts and black shorts at their home pitch at Tempelhofer Feld.

The club was a founding member of the VBB (Verband Berliner Ballspielvereine or Federation of Berlin Ballgame Teams) and also played in the VDBV (Verband Deutscher Ballspiel Vereine or Federation of German Ballgame Teams) as a first division side from 1898 to 1904 before slipping to lower-tier competition. BFCF also spent at least one season (1909) in second division play in the Berliner Ballspiel Bund. In 1910, the team advanced to the final of the Berliner Pokal (Berlin Cup) where they lost 1:4 to Weißenseer FC.

Throughout most of its existence the club was a lower table side with their best result being a second-place finish in 1898. In 1914, Fortuna merged with Britannia Berlin to form present-day side Berliner SV.
