= Stan Taylor (trade unionist) =

British trade unionist

Edgar Stanley Taylor (22 Sep 1909 – 31 May 1966) was a British trade unionist, who served on the National Executive Committee (NEC) of the Labour Party.

Taylor became a carpenter, and was active in the Amalgamated Society of Woodworkers (ASW). In 1945, he began working for the union full-time as a district official, and in 1953, he was elected to its executive council. From 1963, he served on the National Executive Committee of the Labour Party. He also served on the executive committee of the National Federation of Building Trades Operatives.
