= VfK Südwest Leipzig =

German association football club

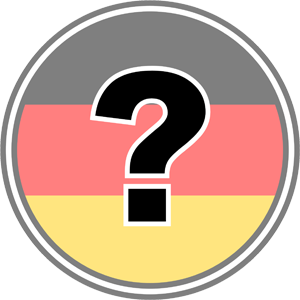
- Full name: Verein für Köperkultur Südwest Leipzig
- Founded: 1892
Home colours	Away colours

VfK Südwest Leipzig was a German association football club from the city of Leipzig, Saxony. The team was part of the Arbeiter-Turn- und Sportbund (ATSB or Workers' Gymnastics and Sports Federation) a national German sports organization active between 1893 and 1933. The ATSB actively promoted leftist political views built around class struggle and nationalism. The Nazi regime regarded worker's and faith-based clubs as politically undesirable and this led to the disbanding of the club in 1933. VfK made a single playoff appearance in 1931-32 and were eliminated 4:3 by FT Cottbus 93
