= BFC Columbia 1896 Berlin =

- Full name: Berliner Fußball-Club Columbia 1896 Berlin e.V.
- Nickname(s): Columbia
- Founded: 1896
- Dissolved: 1945
Home colours	Away colours

BFC Columbia 1896 Berlin (Berliner Fußball-Club Columbia 1896 Berlin e.V.) was a German football club based in Berlin. It was founded in 1896 and dissolved in 1945. The club had a significant impact on German football during the early 20th century.

== History ==
BFC Columbia 1896 Berlin was established in 1896 with the aim of promoting and developing football in the local community. It was one of the founding clubs of the DFB The club quickly rose to prominence and became one of the leading football clubs in Berlin.

During its early years, Columbia actively participated in regional and city-level football competitions. The club's success on the field earned them recognition and respect within the Berlin football community. In 1904, they achieved a major milestone by winning the Berlin Football Championship (Berliner Fußballmeisterschaft).

Columbia's performance continued to be impressive, leading to their inclusion as one of the founding members of the German Football Association (Deutscher Fußball-Bund) in 1900. This allowed them to compete in national-level competitions against other top clubs from across Germany.

The club experienced its golden era in the 1910s, securing multiple Berlin Football Championship titles. In 1912, they reached the final of the German championship, known as the Viktoria Pokal, ultimately losing the match against Holstein Kiel.

== Achievements ==
- Berlin Football Championship:
  - Winners (multiple times, years unknown)
- German Championship:
  - Runners-up: 1912

Following the end of World War I, Columbia faced financial difficulties and internal conflicts, which led to a period of instability. The club struggled to maintain its previous level of success and gradually declined during the 1920s.

During the era of Nazi Germany, Columbia confronted various challenges and restrictions imposed by the government. The club's activities were severely limited, and many of its Jewish members were forced to leave. These circumstances significantly impacted the club's performance, contributing to its further decline.

In 1945, at the conclusion of World War II, BFC Columbia 1896 Berlin was dissolved, like many other German clubs. It ceased to exist as a separate entity.

== See also ==
- Football in Germany
