= Hans Appel =

German footballer (1911–1973)

Personal information
- Date of birth: 8 June 1911
- Place of birth: Wilmersdorf, Germany
- Date of death: 27 July 1973 (aged 62)
- Position: Defender

Senior career*
Years	Team	Apps	(Gls)
1930–1932	Hertha BSC		
1932–1943	Berliner SV 92		
1943–1944	Hertha BSC		
1944–1945	Dresdner SC		
1945–1952	FC St. Pauli		

International career
1933–1938	Germany	5	(0)

Managerial career
- 1952: FC St. Pauli
- 1955–1958: VfR Neumünster
- * Club domestic league appearances and goals

Hans Appel (8 June 1911 – 27 July 1973) was a German footballer who played as a defender for Hertha BSC, Berliner SV 92, Dresdner SC and FC St. Pauli. He also represented the Germany national team, and was capped five times between 1933 and 1938.
