= Sportplatz Memellandallee =

American football stadium in Hamburg, Germany

Coordinates: 53°34′03″N 9°56′28″E

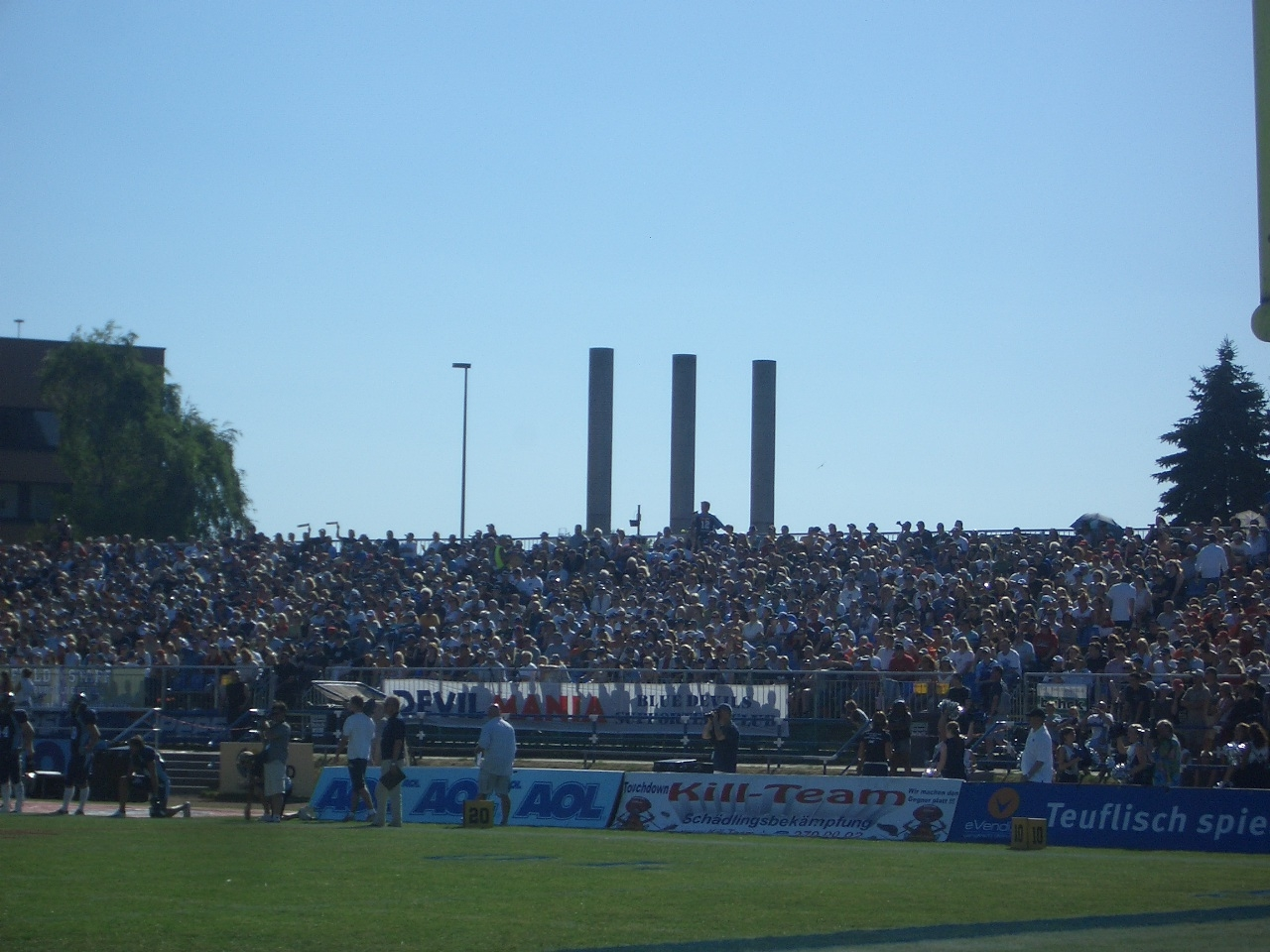
Sportplatz Memellandallee, the former eVendi arena

The Sportplatz Memellandallee is an American football stadium for the Hamburg Blue Devils American football team in Altona-Nord, Hamburg, Germany. It was built in 2005. From 2005 to 2008 it was called eVendi Arena after a temporary sponsor.
