= Post Südstadt Karlsruhe =

German sports club

- Full name: Post Südstadt Karlsruhe e.V.
- Nickname(s): PSK
- Founded: 1896/2001
- League: Landesliga Mittelbaden (VII)
- 2015–16: 16th (relegated)

Post Südstadt Karlsruhe e.V. – Verein für Sport, Freizeit, Gesundheit und Integration (mostly abbreviated to Post Südstadt Karlsruhe or just PSK) is a German sports club from the city of Karlsruhe, Baden-Württemberg that was formed in 2001 through the merger of Karlsruhe VfB Südstadt (established in 1896) and Postsportverein Karlsruhe (established in 1927). The footballers of VfB, playing as Karlsruher FC Südstadt sometime early in the club's history, are notable as founding members of the German Football Association (Deutscher Fussball Bund or German Football Association) in Leipzig in 1900.

== History ==
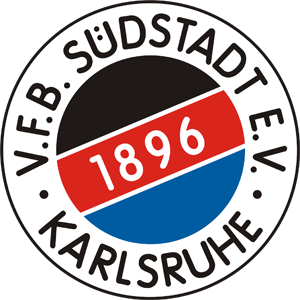
Original logo of VfB Karlsruhe.

|In the late 1890s and early 1900s the club played as a member of the KFB (Karlsruher Fußball-Bund or Karlsruhe Football Federation). Little is known about the league and certain of its member teams included Südstadt, Karlsruher FV 1891, FC Phönix 1894 Karlsruhe, FC Germania 1898 Karlsruhe, FC Franconia 1895 Karlsruhe and FC Alemannia 1897 Karlsruhe.

The league is believed to have been formed in the spring or summer of 1899 and to have led a short tumultuous existence. Friedrich Wilhelm Nohe, chairman of Karlsruher FV, also acted as chairman of the league and of the VSFV (Verband Süddeutscher Fußball-Vereine or Federation of South German Football Associations). Nohe found himself in conflict with the leadership of several of the KFB's clubs as well as with Walther Bensemann, chairman of a committee established to organize matches between German and foreign clubs.

These conflicts led to the collapse of the KFB after only a single season. Some FV players left for other clubs, while Südstadt and Germania pulled out of the league. Südstadt and Phönix went on to join the DFB. The club left the DFB in 1924 to become part of the ATSB (Arbeiter-Turn- und Sportbund or Workers' Sports Association), one of several national sports associations active in Germany at the time. Following the rise of the Nazis the ATSB and other sports organizations were broken up in 1933 as politically unpalatable to the regime. VfB and many similar such clubs saw their memberships dispersed or forced into mergers with other more ideologically acceptable sides. VfB was reestablished after World War II and the current-day club has several other sporting departments in addition to its football side and focuses on recreational sport and wellness. The footballers most recently played in the Landesliga Mittelbaden from where they were relegated at the end of the 2015–16 season.

== Division ==
With almost 4,000 members, Post Südstadt Karlsruhe is one of the largest associations in Karlsruhe. It comprises the following departments:

Ball sports

- Basketball
- Beach volleyball
- Soccer
- Handball
- Quidditch
- Volleyball

Martial arts

- Aikido
- Judo
- Self defense
- TaekWonDo

Individual sport

- Badminton
- Athletics
- Tennis
- Table tennis
- Triathlon

Leisure activities

- Photography
- Chess
- Swimming
- Hiking

There are also the divisions "Sports and Health", "Disabled Sports" and "Popular Sports/Sports Badges".
