= SV Lipsia 93 =

German football club

SV Lipsia 1893 Eutritzsch is a German association football club based in the Eutritzsch district of Leipzig and is notable as one of the founding clubs of the German Football Association (Deutscher Fussball Bund) in that city in 1900. Lipsia is the Latin name for Leipzig.

The team was established on February 1, 1893, by a group of apprentices from a local company as the Lipsia Football Club in the Gohlis restaurant Zur Mühle, making it the earliest football club in Saxony. Their first games were played on the parade ground in Gohlis. In 1897, Lipsia joined the newly formed Verband Leipziger Ballspiel-Vereine (Leipzig Ball Game Association). FC was able to lease a piece of land in 1913 from the Eutritzsch Church and convert it into a football field. The membership of the club grew steadily after World War I and after World War II, Lipsia's grounds were moved to Thaerstrasse, where they are still found today.

In the aftermath of the war, most organizations were dissolved as part of the process of de-Nazification. Lipsia was not re-established until 1959 as BSG Eutritzsch Einheit and took part as an unheralded local side in the separate football competition established in Soviet-occupied East Germany. In 1989, now playing as BSG Baufa Eutritzsch won its first honours as the city champion of Leipzig and advanced to district level competition. class. After German reunification, the team was known as SSV Baufa Eutritzsch and in 1990 were promoted to the Leipzig district league.
