= FC Eintracht Altona =

German football club

- Full name: Fußball-Club Eintracht Altona
- Founded: 1897
- Dissolved: 1902
- League: Hamburger-Altonaer Fussballbund

Fußball-Club Eintracht Altona was an early German football club from Altona, then an independent city near Hamburg. The short-lived club is notable as one of the founding members of the DFB (Deutscher Fussball Bund or German Football Association) at Leipzig on January 28, 1900, where they were represented by a former team captain of SC Victoria Hamburg, Walter Sommeyer (also written Sommeier).

Beginning in 1897, FC played a handful of seasons in the highest division of the Hamburger-Altonaer Fussballbund, until withdrawing one game into the second leg of the 1901/02 season. During its brief existence, the club performed poorly and was unable to score a goal in its abbreviated final campaign.

Unrelated clubs using the same name were established in the 1940s and again in 2010. The latter side was removed from the league in 2014 as part of disciplinary action.

== Results ==
FC Eintracht Altona's League Performance
Season	League	Games	Win	Ties	Losses	Goals	Diff.	Points	Final Place in League
1897/98	Hamburger-Altonaer	13	3	0	10	12:54	-42	6	5th
1898/99	Hamburger-Altonaer	13	5	0	8	21:42	-21	10	5th
1899/00	Hamburger-Altonaer	8	2	0	6	16:24	-8	4	6th
1900/01	Hamburger-Altonaer	8	3	1	4	8:16	-8	7	5th
1901/02	Hamburger-Altonaer	7	0	0	7	0:14	-14	0	9th (last)*

* FC Eintracht Altona were awarded last place instead of Britannia Hamburg, who had only played two unofficial games, owing to the withdrawal of the team after the first half of the season.

- Most (confirmed) goals scored in a game: 7
- Most (confirmed) goals conceded in a game: 9
