= Stanley Taylor (cricketer) =

English cricketer

Stanley Shelbourne Taylor (2 March 1875 – 22 July 1965) was an English first-class cricketer active 1899–1902 who played for Middlesex. He was born in Islington; died in Basingstoke.
