= Weißenseer FC =

German football club

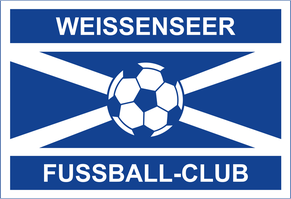
- Full name: Weißenseer Fußball Club 1900 e.V.
- Founded: 1900
- Manager: Alex Scharsig
- League: Bezirksliga Berlin Staffel 1 (VIII)
- 2015–16: 7th

Weißenseer FC is a German football club from district of Weißensee in the city of Berlin. The club's roots go back its founding on 8 September 1900, while more recently it has been linked with Sportverein Prussia Berlin and Pankower Fußball Verein Bergmann-Borsig.

== History ==
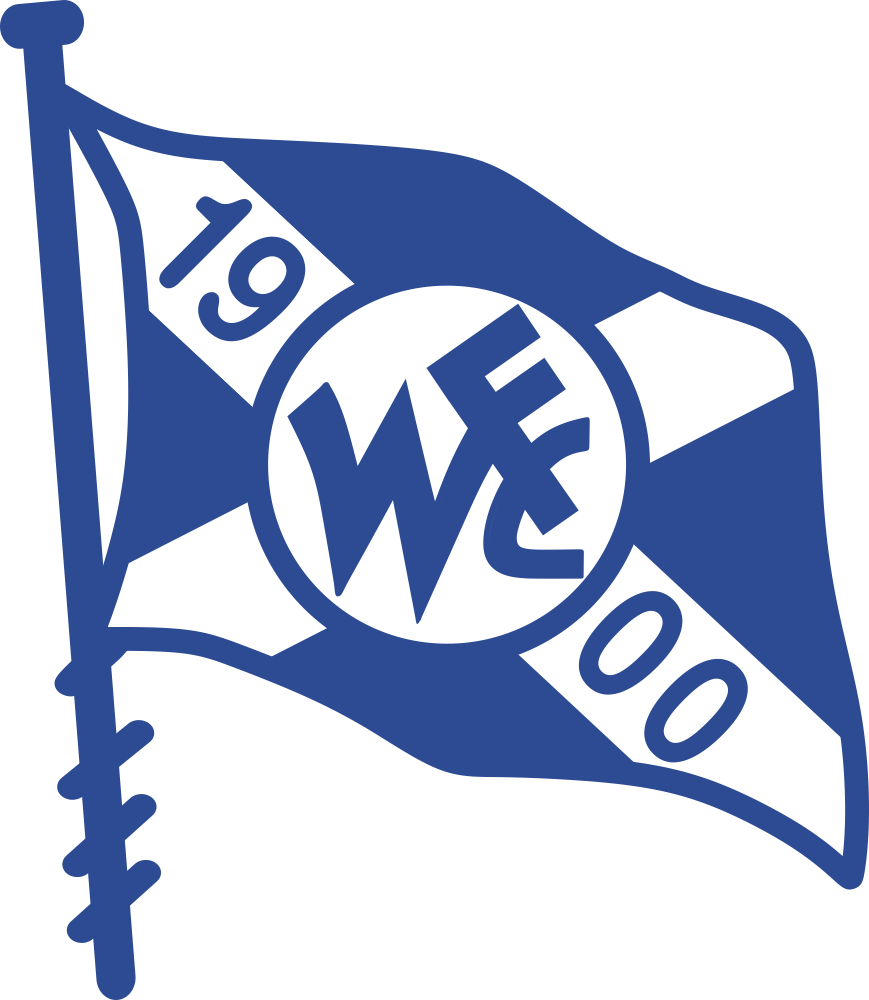
Historic logo of Weißenseer FC

Weißenseer FC was part of the Märkischen Fußball-Bund, an early Berlin-based football league, where they captured the title in 1904. They finished as vice-champions three years later, but left the MFB to join the Verband Berliner Ballspielvereine as a third division side. They quickly rose to second class play and the following year won the city cup. Weißenseer FC advanced to the first division where they would remain until 1918.

They won their way back to top-flight city competition in 1922 and, with the exception of the 1926–27 season, stayed there until 1931. The club grew during this time to include departments for athletics, boxing, and hockey. German football was reorganized under the Third Reich in 1933 and 16 regional top-flight divisions were formed. Weißenseer FC found they were no longer competitive and they failed to break into the Gauliga Berlin-Brandenburg.

== Postwar play in East Germany ==
Following World War II, Germany was occupied by the victorious Allies and the Weißensee district was part of the Soviet zone in Berlin. Existing sports and football clubs were dissolved. New clubs were soon formed and Sportgemeinschaft Weißensee Ost was established as the successor to FC. In 1951, the team was playing third-tier football in the Stadtliga Berlin Ost as ASV Weißensee before being renamed Blau-Weiß Weißensee in 1953.

It was standard practice in East Germany for clubs to have a sponsorship relationship with a local industry, service or government body as a Betriebssportgemeinschaft and in 1956 Blau-Weiß became BSG Einheit Weißensee. They played under that name until 1990 at the Bezirksliga (III) and Bezirksklasse (IV) levels.

== Postunification ==
Following the reunification of Germany, the system of state sponsorship of sports clubs disappeared and clubs sought out other financial support. Einheit was reformed in 1990 as SG Eumako Weißensee with the support of an insurance company. Now part of the single German football competition the team was part of the Landesliga Berlin/2 (VI) and in 1991 advanced to the Verbandsliga Berlin (V). The club's sponsorship deal with Eumako was only good for two years and ended in 1993. The season ended with Eumako Weißenseer relegated after a 15th-place finish.

In June 1993, the decision was made to join SV Preußen Berlin, a large sports club without a football department. They played the 1993–94 season as SV Prueßen and earned a 9th place Landesliga result. Shortly after becoming part of Preußen, that club merged with bankrupt side PFV Bergmann-Borsig which was part of fourth tier competition in the NOFV-Oberliga Nord. The footballers had the choice of either taking the place of PFV in the city's fourth division or leaving the club. A number of players left and the team slipped to lower division play.

In 1997 Preußen folded its football team after its relegation from the Verbandsliga and re-founded Weißenseer FC which separated from the parent club after overcoming some legal difficulties. The new club took over Preußen's place in that league. Since the new association hardly had sufficient financial resources, it was relegated to the Bezirksliga Berlin (VII) in 1999 and to the Kreisliga (VIII) in 2000. Under the leadership of club president Ernst Konrad, it succeeded by bringing sponsors to pool their resources and hiring former DDR-Oberliga referee Reinhard Purzer as a coach. 13 new players with regional and league experience were also hired to guide the club back to the higher levels. In 2001, the revival was achieved in the Kreisliga with promotion from it. In 2009, the club earned another promotion from the Bezirksliga to the Landesliga by winning its own division. Since then it alternated between the Landesliga and Bezirksliga. In May 2011 it absorbed its neighbors HSV Rot-Weiß Berlin which was founded in 1926, with the merged team continuing under the present name.
