= Berliner SV 1892 =

German football club

- Full name: Berliner Sport-Verein 1892 e.V.
- Nickname: Die Störche (The Storks)
- Founded: 1892
- Ground: Stadion Wilmersdorf
- Capacity: 1,000
- Chairman: Michael Kudritzki
- Trainers: Andreas Lietsch; Benno Schaller
- League: Kreisliga A Berlin, Staffel 1 (IX)
- 2015–16: 3rd
Home colours	Away colours

Berliner Sport-Verein 1892 is a German association football club from the district of Wilmersdorf, Berlin. BSV is one of the country's oldest clubs and was a founding member of the DFB (German Football Association) in 1900. The club also operates a rugby union department, Berliner SV 92 Rugby, which, in 1948, reached the German rugby union championship final.

== History ==
=== Britannia Berlin ===
The club was founded as Berliner Thor- und Fussball Club Britannia in 1892 and fielded both football and cricket teams, which alongside rugby were English sports becoming popular in continental Europe at the time. The team first appeared in the city's top flight competition in 1899. In July 1914, after retiring as a player, England national football team and Derby County F.C. legend Steve Bloomer went to Germany to coach Britannia Berlin 92. However within three weeks of arriving the First World War broke out and Bloomer found himself interned at Ruhleben, a civilian detention camp in the Spandau district of Berlin.

=== National championship denied ===
BTuFC Britannia was scheduled to appear in the 1904 national final against VfB Leipzig, regarded at the time as a weaker side despite being the country's defending champion. However, the match was never played. Britannia had earlier defeated Karlsruher FV 6–1 in a game played in Berlin. KFV protested the result because the match had not been played at a neutral venue as required under league rules. The DFB cancelled the final match which was to be held in Kassel and the Viktoria trophy was not awarded that year.

=== Berliner SV ===
After World War I, the club merged with BFC Fortuna and dropped its name association with wartime foe Britain to become Berliner Sport Verein 92. The team played as a mid-table side in the Verbandsliga Berlin-Brandenburg/Oberliga Berlin-Brandenburg throughout the 1920s and into the early 1930s. After the re-organization of German football into sixteen top flight divisions under the Third Reich in 1933, BSV appeared in the Gauliga Berlin-Brandenburg. During the 1936 Summer Olympics in Berlin, their field, BSV 92 Field, hosted some of the handball games while the stadium itself hosted the track cycling events. They won divisional titles in 1936 and 1938, and won the Danzig Pokal in 1939, before being relegated in 1941. Upon their return to first-division football in the 1942–43 season BSV immediately claimed another divisional championship, and looked to be on the way to a fourth title in the war-shortened 1944–45 season. In each case the club was unable to advance beyond the preliminary round of the national playoffs.

After the end of the World War II, most organizations in Germany, including sports and football clubs, were ordered to be disbanded by the Allied administration as part of the process of denazification. BSV was re-formed as Sportgeminde Wilmersdorf and resumed playing in the Berlin league in 1945. They won Gruppe A and then took the league title in a four-team playoff. The Berlin league became the Oberliga Berlin (I) the next season and Wilmersdorf earned two consecutive second-place finishes. Following the partition of Germany and Berlin, Wilmersdorf, home of BSV became part of West Berlin. The club took on its old name for the 1948–49 season and as Berliner SV went on to capture divisional titles in 1949 and 1954 before once again going out early in the West German national playoffs.

The team did not seriously challenge again through the late 1950s and early 1960s. When the Bundesliga, West Germany's new professional football league, was formed in 1963, the club found itself playing in the second division Regionalliga Berlin. 1974 brought the beginning of a slide that would see the team descend through the Amateurliga Berlin (III) to the Landesliga Berlin (IV) by the end of the decade. By the turn of the millennium BSV was playing seventh-division football in the Bezirksliga Berlin. Today the team plays in the Kreisliga Berlin A, Staffel 2 (IX).

== Honours ==
The club's honours:

- Brandenburg football championship
  - Champions: 1898, 1903, 1904
- Gauliga Berlin-Brandenburg
  - Champions: 1936, 1938, 1943, 1945 (championship not completed)
- Oberliga Berlin
  - Champions: 1949, 1954
- Amateurliga Berlin (III)
  - Champions: 1971
- Bezirksliga Berlin (VII)
  - Champions: 2004
- German football championship (I)
  - Finalists: 1904 (final not played)

== German internationals ==
A number of players have achieved selection for the Germany national football team while playing for BSV 92:

- Hans Appel, five caps for Germany from 1933 to 1938
- Kurt Diemer, four caps for Germany in 1912 and 1913
- Erich Goede, one cap for Germany in 1939
- Helmut Jahn, 17 caps for Germany from 1939 to 1942

== Rugby ==
The clubs rugby union department, Berliner SV 92 Rugby, played in the 2. Rugby-Bundesliga in 2008–09, finishing ninth out of ten teams.

== Cricket ==
Britannia Cricket Club, was founded in 1892, and won the Berlin Cricket Championship in 1900, 1903 and 1911. Britannia is affiliated with the ODCV (Ostdeutscher Cricket Verband) on a regional level, and to the DCB (Deutscher Cricket Bund) on a national level. They compete in the Bundesliga-Ost and won the Bundesliga-Ost title for the first time in 2017.
